= 2024 World Boxing Olympic Qualification Tournament 1 =

Boxing competitions

- Location: Busto Arsizio, Italy
- Dates: 3–11 March
- Competitors: 602 from 113 nations

The 2024 World Boxing Olympic Qualification Tournament 1 for the boxing tournament at the 2024 Summer Olympics in Paris, France was held in Busto Arsizio, Italy from 3 to 11 March 2024.

== Quota winners ==
=== Men ===
| Event | Quota winners |
|---|---|
| −51 kg | Alejandro Claro (CUB); Nijat Huseynov (AZE); Juan Manuel López Jr. (PUR); Saken Bibossinov (KAZ) |
| −57 kg | Makhmud Sabyrkhan (KAZ); Yilmar González (COL); Jude Gallagher (IRL); Luiz Oliveira (BRA) |
| −63.5 kg | Jesús Cova (VEN); Obada Al-Kasbeh (JOR); Ruslan Abdullaev (UZB); Bakhodur Usmonov (TJK) |
| −71 kg | Rami Mofid Kiwan (BUL); Asadkhuja Muydinkhujaev (UZB); Aslanbek Shymbergenov (KAZ); Omari Jones (USA) |
| −80 kg | Nurbek Oralbay (KAZ); Kaan Aykutsun (TUR); Turabek Khabibullaev (UZB); Pylyp Akilov (HUN) |
| −92 kg | Lazizbek Mullojonov (UZB); Enmanuel Reyes (ESP); Aibek Oralbay (KAZ); Patrick Brown (GBR) |
| +92 kg | Diego Lenzi (ITA); Nelvie Tiafack (GER); Omar Shiha (NOR); Djamili Aboudou Moindze (FRA) |

=== Women ===
| Event | Quota winners |
|---|---|
| −50 kg | Maxi Klötzer (GER); Sabina Bobokulova (UZB); Aira Villegas (PHI); Ingrit Valencia (COL) |
| −54 kg | Sara Ćirković (SRB); Jutamas Jitpong (THA); Sirine Charaabi (ITA); Võ Thị Kim Ánh (VIE) |
| −57 kg | Nesthy Petecio (PHI); Julia Szeremeta (POL) |
| −60 kg | Chelsey Heijnen (NED); Donjeta Sadiku (KOS); Alessia Mesiano (ITA) |
| −66 kg | María Moronta (DOM); Chen Nien-chin (TPE); Angela Carini (ITA); Aneta Rygielska (POL) |
| −75 kg | Cindy Ngamba (EOR); Chantelle Reid (GBR); Sunniva Hofstad (NOR); Elżbieta Wójcik (POL) |

== Qualification summary ==
| NOC | Men | | | | | | | Women | | | | | | Total |
| NOC | 51 | 57 | 63.5 | 71 | 80 | 92 | +92 | 50 | 54 | 57 | 60 | 66 | 75 | Total |
|---|---|---|---|---|---|---|---|---|---|---|---|---|---|---|
| Azerbaijan | Yes | | | | | | | | | | | | | 1 |
| Brazil | | Yes | | | | | | | | | | | | 1 |
| Bulgaria | | | | Yes | | | | | | | | | | 1 |
| Chinese Taipei | | | | | | | | | | | | Yes | | 1 |
| Cuba | Yes | | | | | | | | | | | | | 1 |
| Colombia | | Yes | | | | | | Yes | | | | | | 2 |
| Dominican Republic | | | | | | | | | | | | Yes | | 1 |
| France | | | | | | | Yes | | | | | | | 1 |
| Germany | | | | | | | Yes | Yes | | | | | | 2 |
| Great Britain | | | | | | Yes | | | | | | | Yes | 2 |
| Hungary | | | | | Yes | | | | | | | | | 1 |
| Ireland | | Yes | | | | | | | | | | | | 1 |
| Italy | | | | | | | Yes | | Yes | | Yes | Yes | | 4 |
| Jordan | | | Yes | | | | | | | | | | | 1 |
| Kazakhstan | Yes | Yes | | Yes | Yes | Yes | | | | | | | | 5 |
| Kosovo | | | | | | | | | | | Yes | | | 1 |
| Netherlands | | | | | | | | | | | Yes | | | 1 |
| Norway | | | | | | | Yes | | | | | | Yes | 2 |
| Philippines | | | | | | | | Yes | | Yes | | | | 2 |
| Poland | | | | | | | | | | Yes | | Yes | Yes | 3 |
| Puerto Rico | Yes | | | | | | | | | | | | | 1 |
| Refugee Olympic Team | | | | | | | | | | | | | Yes | 1 |
| Serbia | | | | | | | | | Yes | | | | | 1 |
| Spain | | | | | | Yes | | | | | | | | 1 |
| Tajikistan | | | Yes | | | | | | | | | | | 1 |
| Thailand | | | | | | | | | Yes | | | | | 1 |
| Turkey | | | | | Yes | | | | | | | | | 1 |
| United States | | | | Yes | | | | | | | | | | 1 |
| Uzbekistan | | | Yes | Yes | Yes | Yes | | Yes | | | | | | 5 |
| Venezuela | | | Yes | | | | | | | | | | | 1 |
| Vietnam | | | | | | | | | Yes | | | | | 1 |
| Total: | 4 | 4 | 4 | 4 | 4 | 4 | 4 | 4 | 4 | 2 | 3 | 4 | 4 | 49 |

== Results ==
=== Men ===
==== Flyweight (51 kg) ====
Section 1

Round 1
Keymberth Solórzano (VEN) | 0
Justin Parina (CAN) | 5
Mehron Shafiev (TJK) | 1
Chandra Bahadur Thapa (NEP) | 4
Zohaib Rasheed (PAK)
Omid Ahmadisafa (ART) | WO
Bashkim Bajoku (KOS) | 0
Ari Bonilla (MEX) | 5

Round 2
Yuberjen Martínez (COL) | 5
Justin Parina (CAN) | 0
Chandra Bahadur Thapa (NEP) | 0
Tomoya Tsuboi (JPN) | 5
Alejandro Claro (CUB) | 5
Omid Ahmadisafa (ART) | 0
Ari Bonilla (MEX) | 1
Luis Delgado (ECU) | 4

Round 3
Yuberjen Martínez (COL) | 5
Tomoya Tsuboi (JPN) | 0
Alejandro Claro (CUB) | 4
Luis Delgado (ECU) | 1

Quota bout
Yuberjen Martínez (COL) | 1
Alejandro Claro (CUB) | 3

Section 2

Round 1
Teo Wei Xuan (SGP) | WO
Fathia Mawanda (UGA)
Deepak Bhoria (IND) | 2
Nijat Huseynov (AZE) | 3
Zhang Jiamao (CHN) | 5
Jabali Breedy (BAR) | 0
Daniýar Rozmetow (TKM) | 0
Roscoe Hill (USA) | 5

Round 2
Rudolf Garboyan (ARM) | 5
Teo Wei Xuan (SGP) | 0
Nijat Huseynov (AZE) | 5
Sakhil Alakhverdovi (GEO) | 0
Huthaifa Eshish (JOR) | 3
Zhang Jiamao (CHN) | 2
Roscoe Hill (USA) | 5
Trofimus Johannes (NAM) | 0

Round 3
Rudolf Garboyan (ARM) | 0
Nijat Huseynov (AZE) | 5
Huthaifa Eshish (JOR) | 0
Roscoe Hill (USA) | 5

Quota bout
Nijat Huseynov (AZE) | 3
Roscoe Hill (USA) | 2

Section 3

Round 1
Tu Po-wei (TPE) | 0
Theophilus Allotey (GHA) | 5
Daniel Varela de Pina (CPV) | 3
Martín Molina (ESP) | 2
Ramón Quiroga (ARG) | 5
Nurzhigit Diushebaev (KGZ) | 0
Jakub Słomiński (POL) | 0
Dmytro Zamotayev (UKR) | 5

Round 2
Tashi Wangdi (BHU) | 0
Theophilus Allotey (GHA) | 5
Daniel Varela de Pina (CPV)
Kim In-kyu (KOR) | RSC R3
Carlos Ramírez (GUA) | 0
Ramón Quiroga (ARG) | 5
Dmytro Zamotayev (UKR) | 1
Juan Manuel López Jr. (PUR) | 4

Round 3
Theophilus Allotey (GHA) | 0
Kim In-kyu (KOR) | 5
Ramón Quiroga (ARG) | 1
Juan Manuel López Jr. (PUR) | 4

Quota bout
Kim In-kyu (KOR) | 2
Juan Manuel López Jr. (PUR) | 3

Section 4

Round 1
Federico Serra (ITA) | 1
Rogen Ladon (PHI) | 4
István Szaka (HUN) | 2
Kiaran MacDonald (GBR) | 3
Kanneth Tam (HKG)
Saken Bibossinov (KAZ) | RSC-3
Cosmin Gîrleanu (ROU) | 4
Seán Mari (IRL) | 1

Round 2
Said Mortaji (MAR)
Rogen Ladon (PHI) | KO R2
Kiaran MacDonald (GBR) | RSC R3
Ortega Jokhu (TTO)
David Macharia (KEN) | 0
Saken Bibossinov (KAZ) | 5
Cosmin Gîrleanu (ROU) | 0
Azat Makhmetov (BHR) | 5

Round 3
Rogen Ladon (PHI) | 1
Kiaran MacDonald (GBR) | 4
Saken Bibossinov (KAZ) | 4
Azat Makhmetov (BHR) | 1

Quota bout
Kiaran MacDonald (GBR) | 0
Saken Bibossinov (KAZ) | 4

==== Featherweight (57 kg) ====
Section 1

Round 1
Makhmud Sabyrkhan (KAZ) | 5
Fikremariyam Leta (ETH) | 0
Lee Cheng-wei (TPE) | 0
Caleb Tirado (PUR) | 5
Seifeddine Letaief (SUI) | 0
Artur Bazeyan (ARM) | 5
Shin Jae-yong (KOR) | 5
Allan Morozov (EST) | 0
Umid Rustamov (AZE) | RSC
Nawwaf Al-Zahmi (UAE)

Round 2
Sarawut Sukthet (THA) | 2
Makhmud Sabyrkhan (KAZ) | 3
Caleb Tirado (PUR) | 5
Artur Bazeyan (ARM) | 0
Asror Vokhidov (TJK) | 4
Shin Jae-yong (KOR) | 1
Umid Rustamov (AZE) | 5
Shaffi Bakari (KEN) | 0

Round 3
Makhmud Sabyrkhan (KAZ) | 5
Caleb Tirado (PUR) | 0
Asror Vokhidov (TJK) | 5
Umid Rustamov (AZE) | 0

Quota bout
Makhmud Sabyrkhan (KAZ) | 4
Asror Vokhidov (TJK) | 1

Section 2

Round 1
José Felipe Mijangos (GUA) | 5
Anthony Joseph (TTO) | 0
Pedro Manuel Gomes (ANG) | 3
Rex Tso (HKG) | 2
Yilmar González (COL) | 3
Mohammad Abu Jajeh (JOR) | 2
Alexey Lagkazasvili (GRE) | 0
Jarosław Iwanow (POL) | 5
Batuhan Çiftçi (TUR) | 2
Tryagain Ndevelo (NAM) | 3

Round 2
Lyu Ping (CHN) | 5
José Felipe Mijangos (GUA) | 0
Pedro Manuel Gomes (ANG) | 3
Victor Tremblay (CAN) | 2
Yilmar González (COL) | 5
Jarosław Iwanow (POL) | 0
Tryagain Ndevelo (NAM) | 5
Jean Caicedo (ECU) | 0

Round 3
Lyu Ping (CHN) | 3
Pedro Manuel Gomes (ANG) | 2
Yilmar González (COL) | 5
Tryagain Ndevelo (NAM) | 0

Quota bout
Lyu Ping (CHN) | 0
Yilmar González (COL) | 5

Section 3

Round 1
Andrey Bonilla (MEX) | 4
Murat Yıldırım (GER) | 1
Şükür Öwezow (TKM) | 4
Francesco Iozia (ITA) | 1
Yoel Finol (VEN) | 0
Danial Shahbakhsh (IRI) | 5
Farid Walizadeh (ART) | 0
Soulaimane Samghouli (MAR) | 5
Hichem Maouche (ALG) | 0
Jude Gallagher (IRL) | 5

Round 2
Carlo Paalam (PHI) | 3
Andrey Bonilla (MEX) | 1
Şükür Öwezow (TKM) | 3
Danial Shahbakhsh (IRI) | 2
Mohammed Shijlawi (IRQ) | 0
Soulaimane Samghouli (MAR) | 5
Jude Gallagher (IRL) | 4
Mohammad Hussamuddin (IND) | 0

Round 3
Carlo Paalam (PHI)
Şükür Öwezow (TKM) | ABD R2
Soulaimane Samghouli (MAR) | 1
Jude Gallagher (IRL) | 4

Quota bout
Şükür Öwezow (TKM) | 0
Jude Gallagher (IRL) | 5

Section 4

Round 1
Munarbek Seitbek Uulu (KGZ) | 1
Luiz Oliveira (BRA) | 4
Artyush Gomtsyan (GEO) | 5
Wasim Abusal (PLE) | 0
Owain Harris-Allan (GBR) | 4
Jose Luis de los Santos (DOM) | 1
Tashi Yoezer (BHU)
Alex Mukuka (NZL) | RSC R3
Oleh Chuliacheiev (UKR) | 4
Sérgio Rodrigues (POR) | 1

Round 2
Vladislav Voroshilov (ISR)
Luiz Oliveira (BRA) | RSC
Artyush Gomtsyan (GEO) | 5
Mohamad Mehdi Sahak (AFG) | 0
Owain Harris-Allan (GBR) | 5
Alex Mukuka (NZL) | 0
Oleh Chuliacheiev (UKR) | 0
Lucas Fernández (URU) | 5

Round 3
Luiz Oliveira (BRA) | 5
Artyush Gomtsyan (GEO) | 0
Owain Harris-Allan (GBR) | 5
Lucas Fernández (URU) | 0

Quota bout
Luiz Oliveira (BRA) | 5
Owain Harris-Allan (GBR) | 0

==== Light welterweight (63.5 kg) ====
Section 1

Round 1
Hugo Micallef (MON) | 1
Mizan Aykol (TUR) | 4
Andriejus Lavrenovas (LTU) | 0
Ismail Umar (FIN) | 5
Mikael Broman (SWE) | 0
Saparmyrat Ödäýew (TKM) | 5
Ibrahim (PAK) | 0
Somchay Wongsuwan (THA) | 5
Jesús Cova (VEN) | 5
Viliam Tankó (SVK) | 0
José Viáfara (COL) | 3
Gianluigi Malanga (ITA) | 2
Mark Ashley Fajardo (PHI) | KO
Albertino Monteiro (POR)

Round 2
Bartłomiej Rośkowicz (POL) | WO
Mizan Aykol (TUR)
Ismail Umar (FIN) | 1
Saparmyrat Ödäýew (TKM) | 4
Somchay Wongsuwan (THA) | 2
Jesús Cova (VEN) | 3
José Viáfara (COL) | 3
Mark Ashley Fajardo (PHI) | 2

Round 3
Bartłomiej Rośkowicz (POL) | 0
Saparmyrat Ödäýew (TKM) | 5
Jesús Cova (VEN) | 4
José Viáfara (COL) | 1

Quota bout
Saparmyrat Ödäýew (TKM) | 0
Jesús Cova (VEN) | 5

Section 2

Round 1
Ali Qasim Hamdan Al-Sarray (IRQ) | 1
Salvador Flores (ESP) | 4
Alexandru Paraschiv (MDA) | 5
Wang Xiangyang (CHN) | 0
Marin Jelačić (CRO) | 0
Assan Hansen (GER) | 5
Elifas Shailemo (NAM) | 0
Robert Jitaru (ROU) | 5
Joshua Tukamuhebwa (UGA) | RSC R3
Edgar García (GUA)
Alexy de la Cruz (DOM) | 1
Yuri Falcão (BRA) | 4

Round 2
Shehzad Ahmed Azam (AFG) | 0
Salvador Flores (ESP) | 5
Alexandru Paraschiv (MDA) | 5
Assan Hansen (GER) | 0
Robert Jitaru (ROU) | 1
Joshua Tukamuhebwa (UGA) | 4
Yuri Falcão (BRA) | 0
Obada Al-Kasbeh (JOR) | 5

Round 3
Salvador Flores (ESP) | 1
Alexandru Paraschiv (MDA) | 4
Joshua Tukamuhebwa (UGA) | 0
Obada Al-Kasbeh (JOR) | 5

Quota bout
Alexandru Paraschiv (MDA) | 0
Obada Al-Kasbeh (JOR) | 5

Section 3

Round 1
Mirzokhid Imamnazarov (KGZ) | RSC R2
Michael Abiola (NGR)
Choi Min-su (KOR) | 1
José Adriel Díaz (PUR) | 4
Shiva Thapa (IND)
Ruslan Abdullaev (UZB) | RSC; R1
Semjon Kamanin (EST) | 0
Radoslav Rosenov (BUL) | 5
Mukhammedsabyr Bazarbayuly (KAZ) | 5
Donnel Phillip (TTO) | 0
Stelios Kirsanidis (GRE) | 4
Ahmed Tebaai (TUN) | 1
Danyil Zamorylo (UKR) | 0
Aleksej Šendrik (SRB) | 5

Round 2
Shpetim Bajoku (KOS) | 5
Mirzokhid Imamnazarov (KGZ) | 0
José Adriel Díaz (PUR) | 0
Ruslan Abdullaev (UZB) | 5
Radoslav Rosenov (BUL) | 3
Mukhammedsabyr Bazarbayuly (KAZ) | 2
Stelios Kirsanidis (GRE) | 1
Aleksej Šendrik (SRB) | 4

Round 3
Shpetim Bajoku (KOS)
Ruslan Abdullaev (UZB) | RSC R2
Radoslav Rosenov (BUL)
Aleksej Šendrik (SRB) | RSC-I R3

Quota bout
Ruslan Abdullaev (UZB) | 3
Aleksej Šendrik (SRB) | 1

Section 4

Round 1
Mesfin Biru Keralah (ETH) | 0
Ali Habibinejad (IRI) | 5
Samuel Contreras (ESA) | 1
Patris Mughalzai (GBR) | 4
Samuel Takyi (GHA) | 0
Shion Nishiyama (JPN) | 5
Luciano Amaya (ARG) | 2
Tayfur Aliyev (AZE) | 3
Bakhodur Usmonov (TJK) | 4
Richarno Colin (MRI) | 1
Lee Kong Ching (HKG)
Abdelhaq Nadir (MAR) | RSC; R2
Ahmad Shtiwi (ISR) | 0
Emilio García (USA) | 5

Round 2
Ali Habibinejad (IRI) | 4
Patris Mughalzai (GBR) | 1
Shion Nishiyama (JPN) | 3
Tayfur Aliyev (AZE) | 2
Bakhodur Usmonov (TJK) | 4
Abdelhaq Nadir (MAR) | 1
Emilio García (USA) | 2
Erislandy Álvarez (CUB) | 3

Round 3
Ali Habibinejad (IRI) | 0
Shion Nishiyama (JPN) | 5
Bakhodur Usmonov (TJK) | 3
Erislandy Álvarez (CUB) | 2

Quota bout
Shion Nishiyama (JPN) | 2
Bakhodur Usmonov (TJK) | 3

==== Light middleweight (71 kg) ====
Preliminaries
| | Score | |
|---|---|---|
| Miloš Bartl (CZE) | 3–2 | Juan Cedeño (VEN) |
| Levente Gémes (HUN) | RSC-1 | Pavel Kamanin (EST) |
| Armando Bighafa (GBS) | 0–5 | Taufa Lavemaau (TGA) |
| Baýramdurdy Nurmuhammedow (TKM) | RSC-3 | Miroslav Kapuler (ISR) |
| Martin Skogheim (NOR) | 0–5 | Junior Petanqui (CAN) |
| Destiny Idugboe (NGR) | WO | Son Seok-jun (KOR) |

Section 1

Round 1
Alfred Kotey (GHA) | 0
Miloš Bartl (CZE) | 5
Festus Petrus (NAM) | 2
Diogo Semedo (POR) | 3
Wendell Stanley (NZL) | 0
Wanderson de Oliveira (BRA) | 5
Husain Al-Kandari (UAE)
Aidan Walsh (IRL) | RSC R1
Rami Mofid Kiwan (BUL) | 5
Merven Clair (MRI) | 0
Salvatore Cavallaro (ITA) | 5
Karrar Hayder Ismael (IRQ) | 0
Syrgak Abdyzhapar Uulu (KGZ) | 4
Shain Boniface (SEY) | 1
Petar Krešimir Knežević (CRO) | KO
Boniface Maina (KEN)

Round 2
Miloš Bartl (CZE) | KO R2
Diogo Semedo (POR)
Wanderson de Oliveira (BRA) | 5
Aidan Walsh (IRL) | 0
Rami Mofid Kiwan (BUL) | 5
Salvatore Cavallaro (ITA) | 0
Syrgak Abdyzhapar Uulu (KGZ) | 4
Petar Krešimir Knežević (CRO) | 0

Round 3
Miloš Bartl (CZE) | 1
Wanderson de Oliveira (BRA) | 4
Rami Mofid Kiwan (BUL) | 5
Syrgak Abdyzhapar Uulu (KGZ) | 0

Quota bout
Wanderson de Oliveira (BRA) | 1
Rami Mofid Kiwan (BUL) | 4

Section 2

Round 1
Magomed Schachidov (GER) | 5
Levente Gémes (HUN) | 0
Asadkhuja Muydinkhujaev (UZB) | 5
Youcef Islam Yaiche (ALG) | 0
Dejan Leburić (SLO) | 0
Yurii Zakharieiev (UKR) | 5
Rattapol Kadamduan (THA) | 2
Alexander Rangel (COL) | 3
Bruno Fernandes (CPV) | 2
Ronald Chavez Jr (PHI) | 3
Shokhobzhon Shukurov (TJK) | 1
Zeyad Ishaish (JOR) | 4
Tāwhirimātea Toheriri-Hallett (COK) | 0
Zhao Mengyang (CHN) | 5
Taufa Lavemaau (TGA) | 0
Jorge Cuéllar (CUB) | 5

Round 2
Magomed Schachidov (GER) | 1
Asadkhuja Muydinkhujaev (UZB) | 4
Yurii Zakharieiev (UKR) | 2
Alexander Rangel (COL) | 3
Ronald Chavez Jr (PHI)
Zeyad Ishaish (JOR) | RSC R1
Zhao Mengyang (CHN) | 0
Jorge Cuéllar (CUB) | 5

Round 3
Asadkhuja Muydinkhujaev (UZB) | 5
Alexander Rangel (COL) | 0
Zeyad Ishaish (JOR) | 4
Jorge Cuéllar (CUB) | 1

Quota bout
Asadkhuja Muydinkhujaev (UZB) | 4
Zeyad Ishaish (JOR) | 1

Section 3

Round 1
Alphonse Mendy (SEN)
Baýramdurdy Nurmuhammedow (TKM) | WO
Virgilio de los Santos (DOM) | 5
Eduardo Beckford (PAN) | 0
Aslanbek Shymbergenov (KAZ) | RSC; R2
Sam Morovati (FIN)
Damian Durkacz (POL) | 5
Ángel Llanos (PUR) | 0
Gurgen Madoyan (ARM) | 5
Vasile Cebotari (MDA) | 0
Carlos Tobar (GUA) | 0
Sergio Martínez (ESP) | 5
️Ziné El Abidine Amroug (MAR) | 2
Sarkhan Aliyev (AZE) | 3
Junior Petanqui (CAN) | 1
Aleksandr Trofimčiuk (LTU) | 3

Round 2
Baýramdurdy Nurmuhammedow (TKM) | 5
Virgilio de los Santos (DOM) | 0
Aslanbek Shymbergenov (KAZ) | 4
Damian Durkacz (POL) | 1
Gurgen Madoyan (ARM) | 4
Sergio Martínez (ESP) | 1
Sarkhan Aliyev (AZE) | 3
Aleksandr Trofimčiuk (LTU) | 2

Round 3
Baýramdurdy Nurmuhammedow (TKM) | 2
Aslanbek Shymbergenov (KAZ) | 3
Gurgen Madoyan (ARM) | 2
Sarkhan Aliyev (AZE) | 3

Quota bout
Aslanbek Shymbergenov (KAZ) | 5
Sarkhan Aliyev (AZE) | 0

Section 4

Round 1
Mohamed Rachem (BEL) | 3
Stefan Savković (MNE) | 2
Aliaksandr Radzionau (ANA) | 0
Omari Jones (USA) | 5
Arena Pakela (LES) | 0
Aaron Prince (TTO) | 5
Moslem Maghsoudi (IRI) | 4
Nidal Foqahaa (PLE) | 0
Eskerkhan Madiev (GEO) | 5
Marcel Nistreanu (ROU) | 0
Lewis Richardson (GBR) | 1
Nishant Dev (IND) | 3
Ladislav Horváth (SVK) | 3
Tony Jas (NED) | 2
Son Seok-jun (KOR) | 2
Christos Karaitis (GRE) | 3

Round 2
Mohamed Rachem (BEL) | 0
Omari Jones (USA) | 5
Aaron Prince (TTO) | 0
Moslem Maghsoudi (IRI) | 5
Eskerkhan Madiev (GEO) | 0
Nishant Dev (IND) | 5
Ladislav Horváth (SVK) | 1
Christos Karaitis (GRE) | 4

Round 3
Omari Jones (USA) | 5
Moslem Maghsoudi (IRI) | 0
Nishant Dev (IND) | 5
Christos Karaitis (GRE) | 0

Quota bout
Omari Jones (USA) | 4
Nishant Dev (IND) | 1

==== Light heavyweight (80 kg) ====
Section 1

Round 1
Michail Tsamalidis (GRE) | 0
Kelyn Cassidy (IRL) | 5
Noa Hadjit (BEL) | 5
Sulaiman Aslami (AFG) | 0
Keven Beausejour (CAN) | 0
Rafayel Hovhannisyan (ARM) | 5
Carlos Góngora (ECU) | 0
Prewa Padabadi (TOG) | 5
Cédrick Belony-Duliepre (HAI) | 0
Nurbek Oralbay (KAZ) | 5
Shabbos Negmatulloev (TJK) | 0
Aliaksei Alfiorau (ANA) | 5
Kevin Schumann (GER) | WO
Jonathan Tetteh (GHA)

Round 2
Wyatt Trujillo (GUA)
Kelyn Cassidy (IRL) | KO
Noa Hadjit (BEL) | 0
Rafayel Hovhannisyan (ARM) | 5
Prewa Padabadi (TOG) | 0
Nurbek Oralbay (KAZ) | 5
Aliaksei Alfiorau (ANA) | KO
Kevin Schumann (GER)

Round 3
Kelyn Cassidy (IRL) | 5
Rafayel Hovhannisyan (ARM) | 0
Nurbek Oralbay (KAZ) | 3
Aliaksei Alfiorau (ANA) | 2

Quota bout
Kelyn Cassidy (IRL) | 2
Nurbek Oralbay (KAZ) | 3

Section 2

Round 1
Robby Gonzales (USA) | 5
Eldric Sella (ART) | 0
Andrei Chiriacov (MDA) | 0
Andrej Csemez (SVK) | 5
Anton Vinogradov (EST) | 0
Kim Jin-jea (KOR) | 5
Erik Mendoza (SWE) | 5
Roman Viney (TGA) | 0
Kaan Aykutsun (TUR) | 5
Charles Cox (BAR) | 0
Andrei Arădoaie (ROU) | 5
Yusufu Nkobeza (UGA) | 0
Weerapon Jongjoho (THA) | 5
Robertas Liorančas (LTU) | 0
Omurbek Bekzhigit Uulu (KGZ) | 5
Giorgi Gutsaev (GEO) | 0

Round 2
Robby Gonzales (USA) | 2
Andrej Csemez (SVK) | 3
Kim Jin-jea (KOR) | 5
Erik Mendoza (SWE) | 0
Kaan Aykutsun (TUR) | 3
Andrei Arădoaie (ROU) | 2
Weerapon Jongjoho (THA) | 0
Omurbek Bekzhigit Uulu (KGZ) | 5

Round 3
Andrej Csemez (SVK) | 2
Kim Jin-jea (KOR) | 3
Kaan Aykutsun (TUR) | 4
Omurbek Bekzhigit Uulu (KGZ) | 1

Quota bout
Kim Jin-jea (KOR) | 1
Kaan Aykutsun (TUR) | 4

Section 3

Round 1
Juan Ortíz (COL) | 3
Gazimagomed Jalidov (ESP) | 1
Nurýagdy Nurýagdyýew (TKM) | 3
Nikita Nystedt (FIN) | 2
Taj Kagho (NZL) | 4
Jeremiah Thomas (TTO) | 1
Turabek Khabibullaev (UZB) | 5
Hussein Ishaish (JOR) | 0
Rafał Perczyński (POL) | 5
Mohammed Houmri (ALG) | 0
Petar Marčić (MNE) | 5
Seyfe Kebede (ETH) | 0
Gebhard Ipinge (NAM) | 0
Yojerlin César (FRA) | 5

Round 2
Go Wakaya (JPN) | 1
Juan Ortíz (COL) | 3
Nurýagdy Nurýagdyýew (TKM) | 0
Taj Kagho (NZL) | 5
Turabek Khabibullaev (UZB) | 5
Rafał Perczyński (POL) | 0
Petar Marčić (MNE) | 0
Yojerlin César (FRA) | 5

Round 3
Juan Ortíz (COL) | 5
Taj Kagho (NZL) | 0
Turabek Khabibullaev (UZB) | 4
Yojerlin César (FRA) | 1

Quota bout
Juan Ortíz (COL) | 0
Turabek Khabibullaev (UZB) | 5

Section 4

Round 1
Mindaugas Gedminas (NOR) | 4
Abraham Buonarrigo (ARG) | 1
Diego Pereira (VEN)
Yusuf Changalawe (TAN) | RSC R1
Mohamed Assaghir (MAR)
Lucky Osaro Aimufua (AUT) | KO
Pylyp Akilov (HUN) | 5
Taylor Bevan (GBR) | 0
Meysam Gheshlaghi (IRI) | KO
Lakshya Chahar (IND)
Héctor Aguirre (MEX) | RSC R1
Seydina Konaté (SEN)
Daniel Ilyushonok (ISR) | 1
Kristiyan Nikolov (BUL) | 4

Round 2
Mindaugas Gedminas (NOR) | 3
Yusuf Changalawe (TAN) | 2
Lucky Osaro Aimufua (AUT) | 0
Pylyp Akilov (HUN) | 5
Meysam Gheshlaghi (IRI) | 3
Héctor Aguirre (MEX) | 1
Kristiyan Nikolov (BUL) | 0
Gradus Kraus (NED) | 5

Round 3
Mindaugas Gedminas (NOR) | 0
Pylyp Akilov (HUN) | 5
Meysam Gheshlaghi (IRI) | 0
Gradus Kraus (NED) | 5

Quota bout
Pylyp Akilov (HUN) | 5
Gradus Kraus (NED) | 0

==== Heavyweight (92 kg) ====
Section 1

Round 1
Pouria Amiri (IRI)
John Marvin (PHI) | RSC R2
Berat Acar (TUR) | 0
Giorgi Kushitashvili (GEO) | 5
Vangelis Nanitzanian (GRE) | 5
Adrian Paoletti (AUS) | 0

Round 2
Kevin Kuadjovi (TOG) | 3
John Marvin (PHI) | 2
Lazizbek Mullojonov (UZB) | RSC R2
Darius Voišnarovič (LTU)
Victor Schelstraete (BEL) | 0
Giorgi Kushitashvili (GEO) | 3
Vangelis Nanitzanian (GRE) | 5
Marko Čalić (CRO) | 0

Round 3
Kevin Kuadjovi (TOG) | 0
Lazizbek Mullojonov (UZB) | 5
Giorgi Kushitashvili (GEO) | 5
Vangelis Nanitzanian (GRE) | 0

Quota bout
Lazizbek Mullojonov (UZB) | 5
Giorgi Kushitashvili (GEO) | 0

Section 2

Round 1
António Rodrigues (POR)
Odai Al-Hindawi (JOR) | RSC R3
Yan Zak (ISR) | 0
Loren Alfonso (AZE) | 5
Erkin Adylbek Uulu (KGZ) | 1
Jakkapong Yomkhot (THA) | 4

Round 2
Carlos Rodríguez (MEX) | 2
Odai Al-Hindawi (JOR) | 3
Loren Alfonso (AZE) | 0
Enmanuel Reyes (ESP) | 3
Tyron Kofi Amo (GER) | 0
Sadam Magomedov (SRB) | 5
Jakkapong Yomkhot (THA) | 4
Aryan Saed Panah (ART) | 0

Round 3
Odai Al-Hindawi (JOR) | 0
Enmanuel Reyes (ESP) | 5
Sadam Magomedov (SRB) | 5
Jakkapong Yomkhot (THA) | 0

Quota bout
Enmanuel Reyes (ESP) | 5
Sadam Magomedov (SRB) | 0

Section 3

Round 1
Andrei Zaplitnîi (MDA) | 2
Daniel Guzmán (DOM) | 3
Aibek Oralbay (KAZ) | 5
Sanjeet Kumar (IND) | 0
Serhii Horskov (UKR) | 0
Julio Castillo (ECU) | 5

Round 2
Narek Manasyan (ARM) | 4
Daniel Guzmán (DOM) | 1
Jamar Talley (USA) | 5
Ayoub Maanni (MAR) | 0
Jung Ha-neul (KOR) | 0
Aibek Oralbay (KAZ) | 5
Julio Castillo (ECU) | RSC R3
Džemal Bošnjak (BIH)

Round 3
Narek Manasyan (ARM) | 1
Jamar Talley (USA) | 4
Aibek Oralbay (KAZ) | 5
Julio Castillo (ECU) | 0

Quota bout
Jamar Talley (USA) | 0
Aibek Oralbay (KAZ) | 5

Section 4

Round 1
Soheb Bouafia (FRA) | 5
Bryan Colwell (CAN) | 0
Marlon Hurtado (COL) | 1
Joseph Kostúr (SVK) | 4
Luis Sánchez (VEN) | 5
Artykmammet Shohratgeldiyev (TKM) | 0

Round 2
Leclerc Nogaus (HAI) | 0
Soheb Bouafia (FRA) | 5
Joseph Kostúr (SVK) | 0
Mateusz Bereźnicki (POL) | 5
Boban Ilioski (MKD) | 0
Patrick Brown (GBR) | 5
Luis Sánchez (VEN) | 5
Abdul Qadir Ghafar (AFG) | 0

Round 3
Soheb Bouafia (FRA) | 2
Mateusz Bereźnicki (POL) | 3
Patrick Brown (GBR) | 5
Luis Sánchez (VEN) | 0

Quota bout
Mateusz Bereźnicki (POL) | 0
Patrick Brown (GBR) | 5

==== Super heavyweight (+92 kg) ====
Section 1

Round 1
Martin McDonagh (IRL) | 4
Ali Feliz (DOM) | 1

Round 2
Yusuf Açık (TUR) | 0
Martin McDonagh (IRL) | 5
Azhar (PAK)
Danis Latypov (BHR) | RSC R3
Bakyt Toktosun Uulu (KGZ) | 0
Diego Lenzi (ITA) | 5
Ayoub Ghadfa (ESP) | WO
Mark Ahondjo (GHA)

Round 3
Martin McDonagh (IRL) | 2
Danis Latypov (BHR) | 3
Diego Lenzi (ITA) | 3
Ayoub Ghadfa (ESP) | 2

Quota bout
Danis Latypov (BHR) | 0
Diego Lenzi (ITA) | 5

Section 2

Round 1
Dušan Veletić (SRB) | 4
Cristian Salcedo (COL) | 1
Narender Berwal (IND) | 0
Nelvie Tiafack (GER) | 5

Round 2
Jonas Jazevičius (LTU) | 0
Dušan Veletić (SRB) | 5
Luka Pratljačić (CRO) | 5
Dmytro Lovchynskyi (UKR) | 0
Stylianos Roulias (GRE) | 4
Javier Cruz (MEX) | 1
Nelvie Tiafack (GER) | 5
Jure Šimunović (SLO) | 0

Round 3
Dušan Veletić (SRB) | 4
Luka Pratljačić (CRO) | 1
Stylianos Roulias (GRE) | 0
Nelvie Tiafack (GER) | 5

Quota bout
Dušan Veletić (SRB) | 1
Nelvie Tiafack (GER) | 3

Section 3

Round 1
Mohamed Firisse (MAR) | 0
Omar Shiha (NOR) | 5

Round 2
Muhammad Abroridinov (TJK) | 0
Omar Shiha (NOR) | 5
Kim Do-hyeon (KOR) | 2
Thomas Vianney Mboua (CMR) | 3
Bayikewuzi Danabieke (CHN) | RSC R1
Rustem Mammedov (TKM)
Diarga Baldé (SEN)
Fernando Arzola (CUB) | RSC R1

Round 3
Omar Shiha (NOR)
Thomas Vianney Mboua (CMR) | DSQ R3
Bayikewuzi Danabieke (CHN) | 3
Fernando Arzola (CUB) | 2

Quota bout
Omar Shiha (NOR) | RSC R2
Bayikewuzi Danabieke (CHN)

Section 4

Round 1
István Bernáth (HUN) | 0
Gerlon Congo (ECU) | 5

Round 2
Iman Ramezanpour (IRI) | 5
Keddy Agnes (SEY) | 0
Yordan Hernández (BUL) | 0
Djamili Aboudou Moindze (FRA) | 5
Davit Chaloyan (ARM) | 1
Alexis Barriere (CAN) | 4
Gerlon Congo (ECU) | 5
Danil Rantanen (FIN) | 0

Round 3
Iman Ramezanpour (IRI) | 0
Djamili Aboudou Moindze (FRA) | 5
Alexis Barriere (CAN) | 5
Gerlon Congo (ECU) | 0

Quota bout
Djamili Aboudou Moindze (FRA) | 4
Alexis Barriere (CAN) | 1

=== Women ===
==== Light flyweight (50 kg) ====
Section 1

Round 1
Aylin Jamez (GUA) | 2
Claudia Tótová (CZE) | 3
Kathreen Sterling (HAI) | 1
Rita Soares (POR) | 3
Guo Yi-xuan (TPE) | 5
Christine Ongare (KEN) | 0

Round 2
Alua Balkibekova (KAZ) | 5
Claudia Tótová (CZE) | 0
Jung Joo-hyung (KOR) | 4
Anush Grigoryan (ARM) | 1
Maxi Klötzer (GER) | 5
Rita Soares (POR) | 0
Guo Yi-xuan (TPE) | 5
Janet Acquah (GHA) | 0

Round 3
Alua Balkibekova (KAZ) | 4
Jung Joo-hyung (KOR) | 1
Maxi Klötzer (GER) | RSC R2
Guo Yi-xuan (TPE)

Quota bout
Alua Balkibekova (KAZ) | 2
Maxi Klötzer (GER) | 3

Section 2

Round 1
Nguyễn Thị Tâm (VIE) | 0
Daina Moorehouse (IRL) | 5
Nicole Ďuríková (SVK) | 0
Rinka Kinoshita (JPN) | 5

Round 2
Tayonis Cedeño (VEN) | 2
Daina Moorehouse (IRL) | 3
Danisha Mathialagan (SGP) | 0
Sabina Bobokulova (UZB) | 5
Aldana López (ARG) | 5
Ingrid Gómez (MEX) | 0
Rinka Kinoshita (JPN) | 5
Savannah Stubley (GBR) | 0

Round 3
Daina Moorehouse (IRL) | 2
Sabina Bobokulova (UZB) | 3
Aldana López (ARG) | 0
Rinka Kinoshita (JPN) | 5

Quota bout
Sabina Bobokulova (UZB) | 4
Rinka Kinoshita (JPN) | 1

Section 3

Round 1
Gemini Chan (HKG)
Nina Radovanović (SRB) | RSC-2
Sofie Rosshaug (DEN) | 5
Valeria Cárdenas (CRC) | 0

Round 2
Hanan Nassar (JOR) | WO
Nina Radovanović (SRB)
Tetiana Kob (UKR) | 0
Zlatislava Chukanova (BUL) | 5
Mckenzie Wright (CAN) | 2
Aira Villegas (PHI) | 3
Sofie Rosshaug (DEN) | 5
Sadia Bromand (AFG) | 0

Round 3
Hanan Nassar (JOR) | 0
Zlatislava Chukanova (BUL) | 5
Aira Villegas (PHI) | 5
Sofie Rosshaug (DEN) | 0

Quota bout
Zlatislava Chukanova (BUL) | 0
Aira Villegas (PHI) | 5

Section 4

Round 1
Yuliett Hinestroza (PAN) | 1
Ruhafzo Haqnazarova (TJK) | 4
Natalia Kuczewska (POL) | 5
Petra Mezei (HUN) | 0
Antonia Giannakopoulou (GRE)
Ingrit Valencia (COL) | WO

Round 2
Adeola Oyesiji (NGR) | 1
Ruhafzo Haqnazarova (TJK) | 4
Natalia Kuczewska (POL) | 5
Mihaela Bădescu (ROU) | 0
Susan Aguas (ECU) | 3
Marjona Savrieva (AZE) | 2
Ingrit Valencia (COL) | 3
Pihla Kaivo-oja (FIN) | 2

Round 3
Ruhafzo Haqnazarova (TJK) | 2
Natalia Kuczewska (POL) | 3
Susan Aguas (ECU) | 0
Ingrit Valencia (COL) | 5

Quota bout
Natalia Kuczewska (POL) | 0
Ingrit Valencia (COL) | 5

==== Bantamweight (54 kg) ====
Section 1

Round 1
Romane Moulai (FRA) | 3
Jennifer Lehane (IRL) | 2
Zeynab Rahimova (AZE) | 4
Fatma Zohra Abdelkader (ALG) | 1

Round 2
Sara Ćirković (SRB) | 4
Romane Moulai (FRA) | 1
Zhaina Shekerbekova (KAZ) | 1
Shukura Kareem (NGR) | 4
Scarlett Delgado (CAN) | 4
Anna Svensson (SWE) | 1
Zeynab Rahimova (AZE) | RSC R1
Agerie Emagnu Bayew (ETH)

Round 3
Sara Ćirković (SRB) | 5
Shukura Kareem (NGR) | 0
Scarlett Delgado (CAN) | 5
Zeynab Rahimova (AZE) | 0

Quota bout
Sara Ćirković (SRB) | 3
Scarlett Delgado (CAN) | 2

Section 2

Round 1
Bibiana Lovašová (SVK)
Johana Gómez (VEN) | RSC R3
Angelyris López (PUR) | 5
Coletivi Yetongnon (TOG) | 0

Round 2
Jutamas Jitpong (THA) | 3
Johana Gómez (VEN) | 2
Claudine Veloso (PHI) | 0
Mikoto Harada (JPN) | 5
Asya Ari (GER)
Sofía Robles (ARG) | WO
Angelyris López (PUR) | 0
Shera Mae Patricio (USA) | 5

Round 3
Jutamas Jitpong (THA) | 5
Mikoto Harada (JPN) | 0
Sofía Robles (ARG) | 0
Shera Mae Patricio (USA) | 5

Quota bout
Jutamas Jitpong (THA) | 5
Shera Mae Patricio (USA) | 0

Section 3

Round 1
Anjani Teli (NEP) | 0
Sandra Drabik (POL) | 5
Tatevik Khachatryan (ARM) | 0
Denisse Bravo (CHI) | 5

Round 2
Sirine Charaabi (ITA) | 4
Sandra Drabik (POL) | 1
Alondra Sánchez (MEX) | 0
Marta López (ESP) | 5
Melissa Mortensen (DEN) | 2
Im Ae-ji (KOR) | 3
Denisse Bravo (CHI) | 0
Huang Hsiao-wen (TPE) | 5

Round 3
Sirine Charaabi (ITA) | 5
Marta López (ESP) | 0
Im Ae-ji (KOR) | 4
Huang Hsiao-wen (TPE) | 1

Quota bout
Sirine Charaabi (ITA) | 4
Im Ae-ji (KOR) | 1

Section 4

Round 1
Emma Jokiaho (FIN) | 0
Islem Ferchichi (TUN) | 5
Winnie Au (HKG)
Estéfani Almánzar (DOM) | RSC R1

Round 2
Anastasiia Kovalchuk (UKR) | 2
Islem Ferchichi (TUN) | 3
Helen Sánchez (ECU) | 3
Iulia Coroli (MDA) | 1
Aikaterina Koutsogeorgopoulou (GRE) | 0
Hanna Lakotár (HUN) | 4
Estéfani Almánzar (DOM) | 1
Võ Thị Kim Ánh (VIE) | 4

Round 3
Islem Ferchichi (TUN) | 5
Helen Sánchez (ECU) | 0
Hanna Lakotár (HUN) | 0
Võ Thị Kim Ánh (VIE) | 5

Quota bout
Islem Ferchichi (TUN) | 0
Võ Thị Kim Ánh (VIE) | 5

==== Featherweight (57 kg) ====
Section 1

Round 1
Nesthy Petecio (PHI) | RSC R1
Anđela Branković (SRB)

Round 2
Claudia Nechita (ROU) | 0
Nesthy Petecio (PHI) | 5
Nguyễn Huyền Trân (VIE)
Canan Taş (GER) | RSC R2
Chahira Selmouni (ALG) | 0
Maud van der Toorn (NED) | 5
Mariatou Diallo (SEN) | 0
Jennifer Fernández (ESP) | 5

Round 3
Nesthy Petecio (PHI) | 5
Canan Taş (GER) | 0
Maud van der Toorn (NED) | 5
Jennifer Fernández (ESP) | 0

Round 4
Nesthy Petecio (PHI) | 5
Maud van der Toorn (NED) | 0

Section 2

Round 1
Xu Zichun (CHN) | 5
Legnis Cala (CUB) | 0

Round 2
Esra Yıldız (TUR) | 5
Bojana Gojković (MNE) | 0
Mahsati Hamzayeva (AZE) | 2
Preedakamon Tintabthai (THA) | 3
Jekaterina Sorokina (LAT) | 0
Elise Glynn (GBR) | 5
Xu Zichun (CHN) | 5
Nikolina Ćaćić (CRO) | 0

Round 3
Esra Yıldız (TUR) | 5
Preedakamon Tintabthai (THA) | 0
Elise Glynn (GBR) | 3
Xu Zichun (CHN) | 2

Round 4
Esra Yıldız (TUR) | 4
Elise Glynn (GBR) | 1

Section 3

Round 1
Leilani Reyes (GUA) | 0
Ana Marija Milisic (SUI) | 5

Round 2
Julia Szeremeta (POL) | 5
Ana Marija Milisic (SUI)
Anastasiia Molochko (UKR) | WO
Teretia Toauriri Kabuaua (KIR)
Szabina Szűcs (HUN)
Lucie Horváth Sedláčková (CZE) | RSC R2
Sitora Turdibekova (UZB) | WO
Vilma Viitanen (FIN)

Round 3
Julia Szeremeta (POL) | 5
Anastasiia Molochko (UKR) | 0
Lucie Horváth Sedláčková (CZE) | 1
Sitora Turdibekova (UZB) | 4

Round 4
Julia Szeremeta (POL) | 4
Sitora Turdibekova (UZB) | 1

Section 4

Round 1
Jennifer Carrillo (MEX)
Alyssa Mendoza (USA) | RSC R1

Round 2
Marie Al-Ahmadieh (CAN) | 3
Olga Papadatou (GRE) | 2
Jin Hye-jeong (KOR) | RSC R2
Fatima Zahra (PAK)
Miguelina Hernández (DOM) | 1
Nisrine Amine (MAR) | 3
Alyssa Mendoza (USA) | 3
Satsuki Yoshizawa (JPN) | 2

Round 3
Marie Al-Ahmadieh (CAN) | 0
Jin Hye-jeong (KOR) | 5
Nisrine Amine (MAR)
Alyssa Mendoza (USA) | RSC R1

Round 4
Jin Hye-jeong (KOR) | 0
Alyssa Mendoza (USA) | 5

Quota bouts

Quota bouts
Nesthy Petecio (PHI) | 4
Esra Yıldız (TUR) | 1
Julia Szeremeta (POL) | 3
Alyssa Mendoza (USA) | 2

==== Lightweight (60 kg) ====
Section 1

Round 1
Rimma Volossenko (KAZ) | 5
Tianna Guy (TTO) | 0
Carolina Ferreira (POR) | 3
Hà Thị Linh (VIE) | 2
Chaymae Rhaddi (MAR) | 2
Hanna Okhrei (UKR) | 3

Round 2
Petra Szabó (HUN) | 0
Rimma Volossenko (KAZ) | 5
Camila Piñeiro (URU) | 4
Anna Sorokina (LAT) | 1
Patrycja Borys (POL) | 2
Carolina Ferreira (POR) | 3
Hanna Okhrei (UKR) | 0
Miroslava Jedináková (SVK) | 5

Round 3
Rimma Volossenko (KAZ) | 5
Camila Piñeiro (URU) | 0
Carolina Ferreira (POR) | 1
Miroslava Jedináková (SVK) | 4

Round 4
Rimma Volossenko (KAZ) | 2
Miroslava Jedináková (SVK) | 3

Section 2

Round 1
Riza Pasuit (PHI) | 0
Krisandy Rios (VEN) | 5
Tara Bohatjuk (BIH) | 5
Fe'ofa'aki Epenisa (TGA) | 0

Round 2
Oh Yeon-ji (KOR) | 5
Krisandy Rios (VEN) | 0
Laura Akram (PAK)
Anna Jenni (SUI) | WO
Troy Garton (NZL) | 0
Chelsey Heijnen (NED) | 5
Tara Bohatjuk (BIH) | 0
Aslahan Mehmedova (BUL) | 5

Round 3
Oh Yeon-ji (KOR) | 3
Anna Jenni (SUI) | 2
Chelsey Heijnen (NED) | 5
Aslahan Mehmedova (BUL) | 0

Round 4
Oh Yeon-ji (KOR) | 1
Chelsey Heijnen (NED) | 4

Section 3

Round 1
Jaismine Lamboria (IND) | 0
Ayaka Taguchi (JPN) | 5
Kiria Tapia (PUR) | 0
Agnes Alexiusson (SWE) | 5

Round 2
Sara Beram (CRO) | 0
Ayaka Taguchi (JPN) | 5
Loredana Marin (ROU) | RSC R1
Anatu Mohammed (GHA)
Elida Kocharyan (ARM) | 1
Guadalupe Solis (MEX) | 4
Agnes Alexiusson (SWE) | 1
Alessia Mesiano (ITA) | 4

Round 3
Ayaka Taguchi (JPN) | 2
Loredana Marin (ROU) | 3
Guadalupe Solís (MEX) | 1
Alessia Mesiano (ITA) | 4

Round 4
Loredana Marin (ROU) | 0
Alessia Mesiano (ITA) | 5

Section 4

Round 1
Terris Smith (CAN) | 1
Lenka Bernardová (CZE) | 4
Ana Starovoitova (LTU) | 0
Sheila Martínez (ESP) | 5
Christina Linardatou (GRE) | 5
Zann Chee (SGP) | 0

Round 2
Felicitas Ganglbauer (GER) | 3
Lenka Bernardová (CZE) | 2
Sheila Martínez (ESP) | 1
Raykhona Kodirova (UZB) | 4
Donjeta Sadiku (KOS) | 5
Shona Whitwell (GBR) | 0
Christina Linardatou (GRE) | RSC R3
Dana Ali (QAT)

Round 3
Felicitas Ganglbauer (GER) | 3
Raykhona Kodirova (UZB) | 2
Donjeta Sadiku (KOS) | 5
Christina Linardatou (GRE) | 0

Round 4
Felicitas Ganglbauer (GER) | 0
Donjeta Sadiku (KOS) | 5

Quota bouts

Quota bouts
Miroslava Jedináková (SVK) | 1
Chelsey Heijnen (NED) | 4
Alessia Mesiano (ITA) | 2
Donjeta Sadiku (KOS) | 3

Quota bout
Miroslava Jedináková (SVK) | 0
Alessia Mesiano (ITA) | 5

==== Welterweight (66 kg) ====
Section 1

Round 1
Émilie Sonvico (FRA) | 3
Ankushita Boro (IND) | 2

Round 2
Luna Beeloo (NED) | 5
Émilie Sonvico (FRA) | 0
Paraskevi Mavrommati (GRE) | 0
Navbakhor Khamidova (UZB) | 5
Ani Hovsepyan (ARM) | 0
María Moronta (DOM) | 5
Suzette Ramírez (MEX) | 3
Crinuţa Sebe (ROU) | 2

Round 3
Luna Beeloo (NED) | 0
Navbakhor Khamidova (UZB) | 5
María Moronta (DOM) | 5
Suzette Ramírez (MEX) | 0

Quota bout
Navbakhor Khamidova (UZB) | 1
María Moronta (DOM) | 4

Section 2

Round 1
Hoàng Ngọc Mai (VIE) | 0
Shahla Allahverdiyeva (AZE) | 4
Krista Kovalainen (FIN) | 3
Yakelín Estornell (CUB) | 2

Round 2
Mariana Soto (ESP) | 0
Shahla Allahverdiyeva (AZE) | 5
Milena Matović (SRB) | 1
Anastasiia Chernokolenko (UKR) | 4
Chen Nien-chin (TPE) | 5
Jessica Triebeľová (SVK) | 0
Krista Kovalainen (FIN) | 2
Saida Lahmidi (MAR) | 3

Round 3
Shahla Allahverdiyeva (AZE) | 0
Anastasiia Chernokolenko (UKR) | 4
Chen Nien-chin (TPE) | 4
Saida Lahmidi (MAR) | 1

Quota bout
Anastasiia Chernokolenko (UKR) | 0
Chen Nien-chin (TPE) | 5

Section 3

Round 1
Camila Camilo (COL) | 0
Angela Carini (ITA) | 5

Round 2
Mai Kito (JPN) | 0
Angela Carini (ITA) | 5
Sara Kali (CAN) | 5
Kitija Zārberga (LAT) | 0
Joana Nwamerue (BUL)
Yuliannys Álvarez (VEN) | RSC R1
Ivanusa Moreira (CPV) | 5
Emily Nakalema (UGA) | 0

Round 3
Angela Carini (ITA) | 5
Sara Kali (CAN) | 0
Yuliannys Álvarez (VEN) | 0
Ivanusa Moreira (CPV) | 5

Quota bout
Angela Carini (ITA) | 5
Ivanusa Moreira (CPV) | 0

Section 4

Round 1
Stephanie Piñeiro (PUR)
Aneta Rygielska (POL) | WO

Round 2
Stefanie von Berge (GER) | 2
Gráinne Walsh (IRL) | 3
Asiko Friza Anyango (KEN) | 4
María Chiroy (GUA) | 1
Natalya Bogdanova (KAZ) | 4
Lorena Balbuena (ARG) | 1
Aneta Rygielska (POL) | 5
Seon Su-jin (KOR) | 0

Round 3
Gráinne Walsh (IRL) | 5
Asiko Friza Anyango (KEN) | 0
Natalya Bogdanova (KAZ) | 1
Aneta Rygielska (POL) | 4

Quota bout
Gráinne Walsh (IRL) | 2
Aneta Rygielska (POL) | 3

==== Middleweight (75 kg) ====
Section 1

Round 1
Büşra Işıldar (TUR) | 5
Ingrith Maldonado (ECU) | 0
Cindy Ngamba (ART) | 5
Naomi Graham (USA) | 0
Seong Su-yeon (KOR) | 3
Veronika Nakota (HUN) | 2

Round 2
Valentina Khalzova (KAZ) | 4
Büşra Işıldar (TUR) | 1
Cindy Ngamba (ART) | RSC R2
Seong Su-yeon (KOR)

Quota bout
Valentina Khalzova (KAZ)
Cindy Ngamba (ART) | RSC R3

Section 2

| Round 1 | | Round 2 | | Quota bout |
| Baison Manikon (THA) | 0 |
| Aziza Zokirova (UZB) | 5 | Aziza Zokirova (UZB) | 5 |
| Karolina Makhno (UKR) | 5 | Karolina Makhno (UKR) | 0 |
| Vasiliki Stavridou (GRE) | 0 | | | Aziza Zokirova (UZB) | 0 |
| Viviane Pereira (BRA) | 3 | | | Chantelle Reid (GBR) | 5 |
| Hergie Bacyadan (PHI) | 2 | Viviane Pereira (BRA) | 0 |
| Chantelle Reid (GBR) | RSC R2 | Chantelle Reid (GBR) | 5 |
| Eyed Angel George (TTO) |

Section 3

Round 1
Elizabeth Andiego (KEN) | 0
Gabrielė Stonkutė (LTU) | 5
Kimberly Gittens (BAR)
Sunniva Hofstad (NOR) | RSC R1
Luisa Vásquez (COL) | 4
Molka Ben Mabrouk (TUN) | 1
Love Holgersson (SWE) | 3
Citlalli Ortiz (MEX) | 2

Round 2
Gabrielė Stonkutė (LTU) | 0
Sunniva Hofstad (NOR) | 5
Luisa Vásquez (COL) | 0
Love Holgersson (SWE) | 5

Quota bout
Sunniva Hofstad (NOR) | RSC R2
Love Holgersson (SWE)

Section 4

Round 1
Eseta Flint (TGA)
Patricia Mbata (NGR) | RSC R3
Keidy Guevara (VEN) | 0
Monika Langerová (CZE) | 5
Melissa Gemini (ITA) | 1
Elżbieta Wójcik (POL) | 4

Round 2
Patricia Mbata (NGR) | 5
Monika Langerová (CZE) | 0
Elżbieta Wójcik (POL) | WO
Lưu Diễm Quỳnh (VIE)

Quota bout
Patricia Mbata (NGR) | 0
Elżbieta Wójcik (POL) | 5
