= Boxing at the 2026 Asian Games =

- Venue: Nishio City Gymnasium
- Dates: 21 September – 2 October 2026
- Competitors: 190 from 33 nations

Boxing at the 2026 Asian Games was held between 21 September and 2 October 2026 at the Nishio City Gymnasium, Nishio, Aichi Prefecture, Japan.

== Schedule ==
| P | Round of 32 | R | Round of 16 | ¼ | Quarterfinals | ½ | Semifinals | F | Final |

| Event↓/Date → | 21st Mon | 22nd Tue | 23rd Wed | 24th Thu | 25th Fri | 26th Sat | 27th Sun | 28th Mon | 29th Tue | 30th Wed | 1st Thu | 2nd Fri |
|---|---|---|---|---|---|---|---|---|---|---|---|---|
| Men's 55 kg | | P | | | | R | | ¼ | | ½ | | F |
| Men's 60 kg | | | P | | R | | ¼ | | ½ | | | F |
| Men's 70 kg | P | | | R | | | | ¼ | | ½ | | F |
| Men's 80 kg | | | R | | | | ¼ | | ½ | | | F |
| Men's 90 kg | | | | | | R | | ¼ | | ½ | | F |
| Men's +90 kg | | | | | R | | ¼ | | ½ | | | F |
| Women's 51 kg | | P | | R | | | | ¼ | | ½ | | F |
| Women's 54 kg | | P | | | R | | ¼ | | ½ | | | F |
| Women's 60 kg | | | | | | R | | ¼ | | ½ | | F |
| Women's 65 kg | | | | R | | | ¼ | | ½ | | | F |
| Women's 75 kg | | | | | | | | ¼ | | ½ | | F |

== Medalists ==
=== Men ===
| Event | Gold | Silver | Bronze |
|---|---|---|---|
| Bantamweight (55 kg) | Rui Yamaguchi; Japan | Carlo Paalam; Philippines | Makhmud Sabyrkhan; Kazakhstan |
| Bantamweight (55 kg) | Rui Yamaguchi; Japan | Carlo Paalam; Philippines | Kharkhüügiin Bilgüünsaikhan; Mongolia |
| Lightweight (60 kg) | Abdumalik Khalokov; Uzbekistan | Jang Dong-hwan; South Korea | Shunsuke Kitamoto; Japan |
| Lightweight (60 kg) | Abdumalik Khalokov; Uzbekistan | Jang Dong-hwan; South Korea | Akmal Ubaidov; Tajikistan |
| Light middleweight (70 kg) | Torekhan Sabyrkhan; Kazakhstan | Zeyad Ishaish; Jordan | Shavkatjon Boltaev; Uzbekistan |
| Light middleweight (70 kg) | Torekhan Sabyrkhan; Kazakhstan | Zeyad Ishaish; Jordan | Sewon Okazawa; Japan |
| Light heavyweight (80 kg) | Ankush Panghal; India | Kim Min-seong; South Korea | Fazliddin Erkinboev; Uzbekistan |
| Light heavyweight (80 kg) | Ankush Panghal; India | Kim Min-seong; South Korea | Hussein Ishaish; Jordan |
| Heavyweight (90 kg) | Turabek Khabibullaev; Uzbekistan | Han Xuezhen; China | Kapil Pokhariya; India |
| Heavyweight (90 kg) | Turabek Khabibullaev; Uzbekistan | Han Xuezhen; China | Parviz Karimov; Tajikistan |
| Super heavyweight (+90 kg) | Aibek Oralbay; Kazakhstan | Jakhongir Zokirov; Uzbekistan | Narender Berwal; India |
| Super heavyweight (+90 kg) | Aibek Oralbay; Kazakhstan | Jakhongir Zokirov; Uzbekistan | Amir Esmaeili; Iran |

=== Women ===
| Event | Gold | Silver | Bronze |
|---|---|---|---|
| Flyweight (51 kg) | Wu Yu; China | Nguyễn Thị Tâm; Vietnam | Feruza Kazakova; Uzbekistan |
| Flyweight (51 kg) | Wu Yu; China | Nguyễn Thị Tâm; Vietnam | Alua Balkibekova; Kazakhstan |
| Bantamweight (54 kg) | Natnicha Chongprongklang; Thailand | Pang Chol-mi; North Korea | Tsukimi Namiki; Japan |
| Bantamweight (54 kg) | Natnicha Chongprongklang; Thailand | Pang Chol-mi; North Korea | Zhao Xuan; China |
| Lightweight (60 kg) | Lin Yu-ting; Chinese Taipei | Yang Chengyu; China | Sitora Turdibekova; Uzbekistan |
| Lightweight (60 kg) | Lin Yu-ting; Chinese Taipei | Yang Chengyu; China | Priya Ghanghas; India |
| Welterweight (65 kg) | Parveen Hooda; India | Chen Nien-chin; Chinese Taipei | Hwang Hyo-sun; North Korea |
| Welterweight (65 kg) | Parveen Hooda; India | Chen Nien-chin; Chinese Taipei | Li Shu; China |
| Middleweight (75 kg) | Lovlina Borgohain; India | Bao Ziyi; China | Lưu Diễm Quỳnh; Vietnam |
| Middleweight (75 kg) | Lovlina Borgohain; India | Bao Ziyi; China | Natalya Bogdanova; Kazakhstan |

== Medal table ==
| Rank | Nation | Gold | Silver | Bronze | Total |
|---|---|---|---|---|---|
| 1 | India (IND) | 3 | 0 | 3 | 6 |
| 2 | Uzbekistan (UZB) | 2 | 1 | 4 | 7 |
| 3 | Kazakhstan (KAZ) | 2 | 0 | 3 | 5 |
| 4 | China (CHN) | 1 | 3 | 2 | 6 |
| 5 | Chinese Taipei (TPE) | 1 | 1 | 0 | 2 |
| 6 | Japan (JPN) | 1 | 0 | 3 | 4 |
| 7 | Thailand (THA) | 1 | 0 | 0 | 1 |
| 8 | South Korea (KOR) | 0 | 2 | 0 | 2 |
| 9 | Jordan (JOR) | 0 | 1 | 1 | 2 |
| 9 | North Korea (PRK) | 0 | 1 | 1 | 2 |
| 9 | Vietnam (VIE) | 0 | 1 | 1 | 2 |
| 12 | Philippines (PHI) | 0 | 1 | 0 | 1 |
| 13 | Tajikistan (TJK) | 0 | 0 | 2 | 2 |
| 14 | Iran (IRI) | 0 | 0 | 1 | 1 |
| 14 | Mongolia (MGL) | 0 | 0 | 1 | 1 |
| Totals (15 entries) | | 11 | 11 | 22 | 44 |

== Participating nations ==
A total of 190 athletes from 33 nations competed in boxing at the 2026 Asian Games:

- Afghanistan (4)
- Bahrain (5)
- Bangladesh (2)
- Bhutan (3)
- Cambodia (2)
- China (11)
- Chinese Taipei (7)
- India (11)
- Indonesia (5)
- Iran (7)
- Iraq (3)
- Japan (8)
- Jordan (6)
- Kazakhstan (11)
- Kyrgyzstan (6)
- Laos (2)
- Macau (1)
- Mongolia (6)
- Nepal (7)
- North Korea (6)
- Pakistan (4)
- Palestine (1)
- Philippines (6)
- Qatar (2)
- Saudi Arabia (2)
- South Korea (11)
- Sri Lanka (7)
- Tajikistan (10)
- Thailand (11)
- Turkmenistan (5)
- Uzbekistan (11)
- Vietnam (6)
- Yemen (1)
