= 2025 World Boxing Championships – Men's 55 kg =

Competition at amateur boxing tournament

Men's 55 kg at the 2025 World Boxing Championships
- Venue: Liverpool Arena
- Location: Liverpool, England
- Dates: 4–14 September
- Competitors: 39 from 39 nations

Medalists
| gold medal | Makhmud Sabyrkhan | Kazakhstan |
| silver medal | Rafael Lozano | Spain |
| bronze medal | Liu Chuang | China |
| bronze medal | Patsy Joyce | Ireland |

The Men's 55 kg competition at the 2025 World Boxing Championships was held from 4 to 14 September 2025.

== Results ==
=== Finals ===
Semifinals; 13 September
Liu Chuang (CHN) | 0
Makhmud Sabyrkhan (KAZ) | 5
Rafael Lozano (ESP) | 3
Patsy Joyce (IRL) | 2

Final; 14 September
Makhmud Sabyrkhan (KAZ) | 5
Rafael Lozano (ESP) | 0

=== Top half ===
==== Section 1 ====
Preliminaries; 4 September
Carlo Paalam (PHI) | 5
Hsu Chiao-chun (TPE) | 0

Round of 32; 7 September
Junior Alcántara (DOM) | 4
Carlo Paalam (PHI) | 1
Mohammed Al-Muwallad (KSA) | 0
Omid Ahmadisafa (ART) | 5
Jye Dixon (AUS) | 5
Tolga Kaya (TUR) | 0
Nikolas Pawlik (POL) | 0
Liu Chuang (CHN) | 5

Round of 16; 9 September
Junior Alcántara (DOM) | 5
Omid Ahmadisafa (ART) | 0
Jye Dixon (AUS) | 0
Liu Chuang (CHN) | 5

Quarter-finals; 10 September
Junior Alcántara (DOM) | 2
Liu Chuang (CHN) | 3

==== Section 2 ====
Preliminaries; 4 September
Bryan Ortiz (MEX) | 5
Amir Mohammadi (BEL) | 0
Ardit Murja (ALB) | 0
Ellis Trowbridge (ENG) | 5

Round of 32; 7 September
Makhmud Sabyrkhan (KAZ) | 5
Bryan Ortiz (MEX) | 0
Oleh Chuliacheiev (UKR) | 2
Bashkim Bajoku (KOS) | 3
Kian Terwint (NED) | RSC
Ivica Arbanas (CRO)
Ellis Trowbridge (ENG) | 0
Rui Yamaguchi (JPN) | 5

Round of 16; 9 September
Makhmud Sabyrkhan (KAZ) | KO
Bashkim Bajoku (KOS)
Kian Terwint (NED) | 0
Rui Yamaguchi (JPN) | 5

Quarter-finals; 10 September
Makhmud Sabyrkhan (KAZ) | 5
Rui Yamaguchi (JPN) | 0

=== Bottom half ===
==== Section 3 ====
Preliminaries; 4 September
Christopher Hippocrate (FRA) | 3
Yousef Iashash (JOR) | 0
Nebil Ibrahim (SWE) | 5
Gábor Virbán (HUN) | 0

Round of 32; 7 September
Rafael Lozano (ESP) | 5
Christopher Hippocrate (FRA) | 0
Tommaso Sciacca (ITA) | 5
Aaron Cullen (SCO) | 0
Rolando Martínez (CUB) | 1
Nijat Huseynov (AZE) | 4
Nebil Ibrahim (SWE)
Kharkhüügiin Bilgüünsaikhan (MGL) | RSC-I

Round of 16; 9 September
Rafael Lozano (ESP) | 5
Tommaso Sciacca (ITA) | 0
Nijat Huseynov (AZE) | 0
K Bilgüünsaikhan (MGL) | 5

Quarter-finals; 10 September
Rafael Lozano (ESP) | 5
Kharkhüügiin Bilgüünsaikhan (MGL) | 0

==== Section 4 ====
Preliminaries; 4 September
Pawan Bartwal (IND) | 3
Michael Trindade (BRA) | 2
Orlando Zamora-Garcia (USA) | 4
Zafarbek Kamilov (KGZ) | 1

Round of 32; 7 September
Mirazizbek Mirzakhalilov (UZB) | 5
Pawan Bartwal (IND) | 0
Mehdi Kazemi (IRI) | 5
Wilson Solórzano (VEN) | 0
Patsy Joyce (IRL) | 5
Shin Jae-yong (KOR) | 0
Orlando Zamora-Garcia (USA) | 0
Javier Ibáñez (BUL) | 4

Round of 16; 9 September
Mirazizbek Mirzakhalilov (UZB) | 5
Mehdi Kazemi (IRI) | 0
Patsy Joyce (IRL) | 3
Javier Ibáñez (BUL) | 2

Quarter-finals; 10 September
Mirazizbek Mirzakhalilov (UZB) | 2
Patsy Joyce (IRL) | 3
