= Boxing at the 2024 Summer Olympics – Men's 51 kg =

Men's 51 kg at the Games of the XXXIII Olympiad
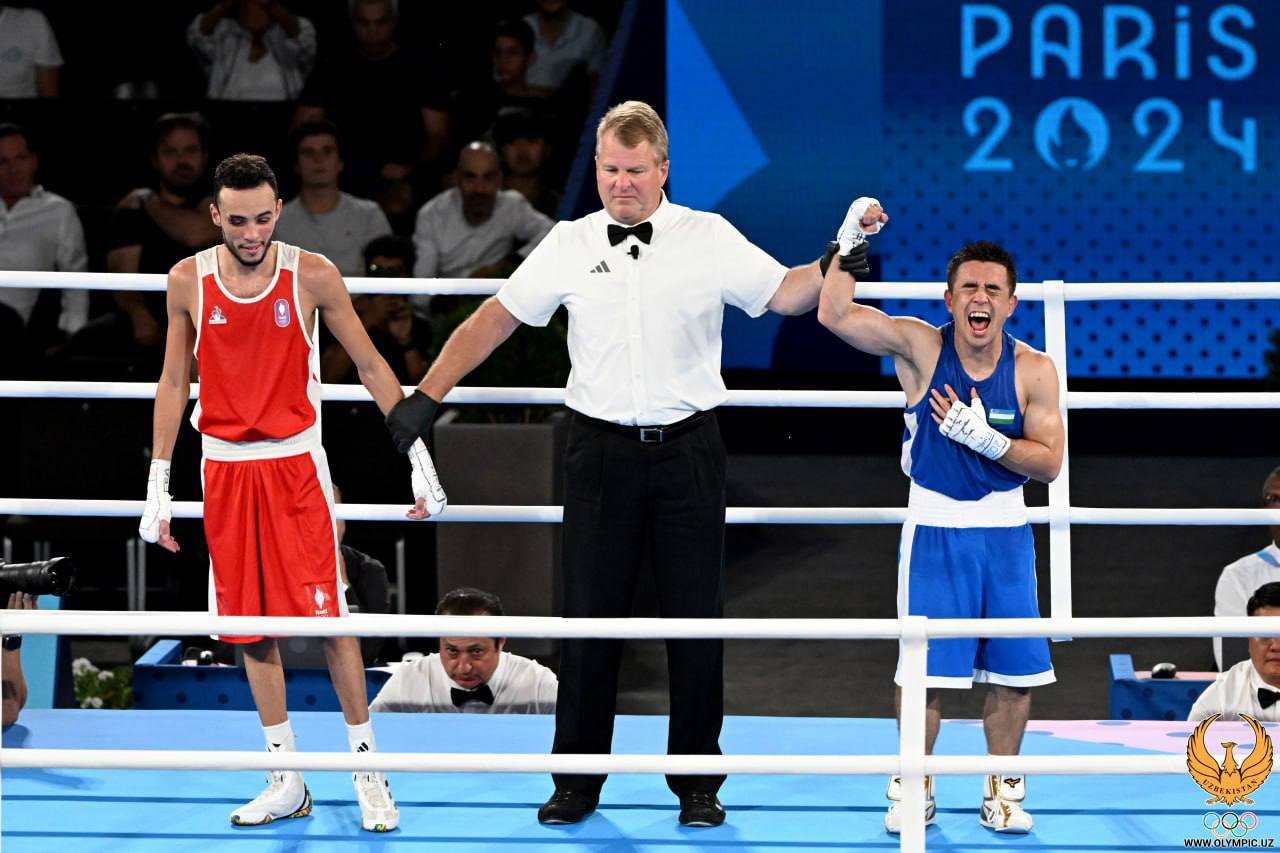
- Referee Wade Peterson raises Dusmatov's hand after the judges declare him the winner in the gold medal bout
- Venue: Arena Paris Nord (preliminary); Stade Roland Garros (semifinals and finals)
- Dates: 28 July – 8 August 2024
- Competitors: 17 from 17 nations

Medalists
1st place, gold medalist(s)		Hasanboy Dusmatov	Uzbekistan
2nd place, silver medalist(s)		Billal Bennama	France
3rd place, bronze medalist(s)		Junior Alcántara	Dominican Republic
3rd place, bronze medalist(s)		Daniel Varela de Pina	Cape Verde

The men's 51 kg (flyweight) boxing event at the 2024 Summer Olympics took place between 28 July and 8 August 2024. Preliminary boxing matches occurred at Arena Paris Nord in Villepinte, with the medal rounds (semifinals and finals) staged at Stade Roland Garros.

== Background ==
This was the 25th appearance of men's flyweight, since 1904 except 1908, and twelve years later, returning of this category. Galal Yafai was the defending Olympic champion, but he did not qualify. The 2020 silver medalist Carlo Paalam upgraded from flyweight to featherweight (57 kg). One of the 2020 bronze medalists, Ryomei Tanaka, did not qualify, while the other bronze medalist, Saken Bibossinov, beat Samet Gümüş 0-5, but lost to Hasanboy Dusmatov, the eventual champion.

== Qualification ==
Each NOC could send one boxer to the event.

- 2 places at 2023 European Games
- 1 place at African Qualifiers
- 2 places at 2022 Asian Games
- 2 places at 2023 Pan American Games
- 1 place at 2023 Pacific Games
- 4 places at World Qualifiers Round 1
- 4 places at World Qualifiers Round 2
- 1 invitational place.

== Competition format ==
Like all Olympic boxing events, the competition was a straight single-elimination tournament. The competition began with a preliminary round, where the number of competitors was reduced to 16, and concluded with a final. As there were fewer than 32 boxers in the competition, a number of boxers received a bye through the preliminary round. Both semi-final losers were awarded bronze medals.

Bouts consisted of three three-minute rounds with a one-minute break between rounds. A boxer may win by knockout or by points. Scoring was on the "10-point-must," with five judges scoring each round. Judges consider "number of blows landed on the target areas, domination of the bout, technique and tactical superiority and competitiveness." Each judge determined a winner for each round, who received 10 points for the round, and assigned the round's loser a number of points between seven and nine based on performance. The judge's scores for each round were added to give a total score for that judge. The boxer with the higher score from a majority of the judges was the winner.

== Schedule ==
The schedule was as follows.

Legend

R32	Round of 32	R16	Round of 16	QF	Quarter-Finals	SF	Semi-Finals	F	Final

Jul 28	Jul 29	Jul 30	Jul 31	Aug 1	Aug 2	Aug 3	Aug 4	Aug 5	Aug 6	Aug 7	Aug 8
R32		R16			QF		SF				F

== Draw ==
The draw was held on 25 July 2024.

== Seeds ==
The seeds were released on 25 July 2024.

1. Billal Bennama (FRA) (final)
2. Hasanboy Dusmatov (UZB) (champion)
3. Patrick Chinyemba (ZAM) (quarterfinals)
4. Junior Alcántara (DOM) (semifinals)
5. Yusuf Chothia (AUS) (round of 16)
6. Thitisan Panmot (THA) (round of 16)
7. Samet Gümüş (TUR) (round of 16)
8. Michael Trindade (BRA) (round of 16)

== Results ==
=== Round of 32 ===
Round of 32
28 July
Omid Ahmadisafa (EOR)	0
Roscoe Hill (USA)	5

=== Bracket ===
Round of 16
30 July
Billal Bennama (FRA)	3
Roscoe Hill (USA)	2
30 July
Alejandro Claro (CUB)	5
Michael Trindade (BRA)	0
30 July
Yusuf Chothia (AUS)	1
Rafael Lozano (ESP)	4
30 July
Nijat Huseynov (AZE)	0
Junior Alcántara (DOM)	5
30 July
Patrick Chinyemba (ZAM)	4
Amit Panghal (IND)	1
30 July
Daniel Varela de Pina (CPV)	4
Thitisan Panmot (THA)	1
30 July
Samet Gümüş (TUR)	0
Saken Bibossinov (KAZ)	5
30 July
Juan López Jr. (PUR)	0
Hasanboy Dusmatov (UZB)	5

Quarterfinals
2 August
Billal Bennama (FRA)	3
Alejandro Claro (CUB)	2
2 August
Rafael Lozano (ESP)	2
Junior Alcántara (DOM)	3
2 August
Patrick Chinyemba (ZAM)	0
Daniel Varela de Pina (CPV)	5
2 August
Saken Bibossinov (KAZ)	2
Hasanboy Dusmatov (UZB)	3

Semifinals
4 August
Billal Bennama (FRA)	5
Junior Alcántara (DOM)	0
4 August
Daniel Varela de Pina (CPV)	0
Hasanboy Dusmatov (UZB)	5

Final
8 August
Billal Bennama (FRA)	0
Hasanboy Dusmatov (UZB)	5
