= 2026 Asian Boxing Elite Boxing Championships =

- Venue: ASA Arena
- Location: Ulaanbaatar, Mongolia
- Dates: 30 March – 10 April
- Competitors: 194 from 21 nations

The 2026 Asian Boxing Elite Boxing Championships were held from 30 March to 10 April 2026 in Ulaanbaatar, Mongolia.

== Medal summary ==
=== Men ===
Event	Gold	Silver	Bronze
50 kg	Vishvanath Suresh; India	Daichi Iwai; Japan	Huthaifa Eshish; Jordan
50 kg	Vishvanath Suresh; India	Daichi Iwai; Japan	John Wayne Vicera; Philippines
55 kg	Rui Yamaguchi; Japan	Kharkhüügiin Bilgüünsaikhan; Mongolia	Liu Chuang; China
55 kg	Rui Yamaguchi; Japan	Kharkhüügiin Bilgüünsaikhan; Mongolia	Makhmud Sabyrkhan; Kazakhstan
60 kg	Orazbek Assylkulov; Kazakhstan	Sachin Siwach; India	Abdurakhmon Makhmudjonov; Uzbekistan
60 kg	Orazbek Assylkulov; Kazakhstan	Sachin Siwach; India	Sakda Ruamtham; Thailand
65 kg	Abdulloh Madaminov; Uzbekistan	Bunjong Sinsiri; Thailand	Shion Nishiyama; Japan
65 kg	Abdulloh Madaminov; Uzbekistan	Bunjong Sinsiri; Thailand	Yertugan Zeinulinov; Kazakhstan
70 kg	Zeyad Ishaish; Jordan	Torekhan Sabyrkhan; Kazakhstan	Sewon Okazawa; Japan
70 kg	Zeyad Ishaish; Jordan	Torekhan Sabyrkhan; Kazakhstan	Wang Peicheng; China
75 kg	Sabirzhan Akkalykov; Kazakhstan	Javokhir Abdurakhimov; Uzbekistan	Ganzorigiin Dalai; Mongolia
75 kg	Sabirzhan Akkalykov; Kazakhstan	Javokhir Abdurakhimov; Uzbekistan	Akash Sangwan; India
80 kg	Fazliddin Erkinboev; Uzbekistan	Hussein Ishaish; Jordan	Kim Min-seong; South Korea
80 kg	Fazliddin Erkinboev; Uzbekistan	Hussein Ishaish; Jordan	Nekruz Salimov; Tajikistan
85 kg	Nurbek Oralbay; Kazakhstan	Jasurbek Yuldoshev; Uzbekistan	Dorjiin Bariakhaan; Mongolia
85 kg	Nurbek Oralbay; Kazakhstan	Jasurbek Yuldoshev; Uzbekistan	Lokesh Chaudhary; India
90 kg	Khalimjon Mamasoliev; Uzbekistan	Parviz Karimov; Tajikistan	Sagyndyk Togambay; Kazakhstan
90 kg	Khalimjon Mamasoliev; Uzbekistan	Parviz Karimov; Tajikistan	Harsh Choudhary; India
+90 kg	Aibek Oralbay; Kazakhstan	Bayikewuzi Danabieke; China	Döwlet Islamow; Turkmenistan
+90 kg	Aibek Oralbay; Kazakhstan	Bayikewuzi Danabieke; China	Narender Berwal; India

=== Women ===
Event	Gold	Silver	Bronze
48 kg	Minakshi Hooda; India	Enkh-Amgalangiin Nomundari; Mongolia	Thipsatcha Yodwaree; Thailand
48 kg	Minakshi Hooda; India	Enkh-Amgalangiin Nomundari; Mongolia	Aigerim Sattibayeva; Kazakhstan
51 kg	Wu Yu; China	An Kum-byol; North Korea	Nikhat Zareen; India
51 kg	Wu Yu; China	An Kum-byol; North Korea	Guo Yi-xuan; Chinese Taipei
54 kg	Preeti Pawar; India	Huang Hsiao-wen; Chinese Taipei	Im Ae-ji; South Korea
54 kg	Preeti Pawar; India	Huang Hsiao-wen; Chinese Taipei	Zhao Xuan; China
57 kg	Punrawee Ruenros; Thailand	Jaismine Lamboria; India	Mijgona Samadova; Tajikistan
57 kg	Punrawee Ruenros; Thailand	Jaismine Lamboria; India	Nigina Uktamova; Uzbekistan
60 kg	Priya Ghanghas; India	Won Un-gyong; North Korea	Monkhoryn Namuun; Mongolia
60 kg	Priya Ghanghas; India	Won Un-gyong; North Korea	Lin Yu-ting; Chinese Taipei
65 kg	Chen Nien-chin; Chinese Taipei	Hwang Hyo-sun; North Korea	Ankushita Boro; India
65 kg	Chen Nien-chin; Chinese Taipei	Hwang Hyo-sun; North Korea	Li Shu; China
70 kg	Arundhati Choudhary; India	Bakyt Seidish; Kazakhstan	Oysha Toirova; Uzbekistan
70 kg	Arundhati Choudhary; India	Bakyt Seidish; Kazakhstan	Alimire Abudureyimu; China
75 kg	Bao Ziyi; China	Aziza Zokirova; Uzbekistan	Valentina Khalzova; Kazakhstan
75 kg	Bao Ziyi; China	Aziza Zokirova; Uzbekistan	Lovlina Borgohain; India
80 kg	Nadezhda Ryabets; Kazakhstan	Rukhshona Parpieva; Uzbekistan	Pooja Rani; India
+80 kg	Dina Islambekova; Kazakhstan	Alfiya Pathan; India	Oltinoy Sotimboeva; Uzbekistan

== Medal table ==
* Host nation (Mongolia)

Rank	Nation	Gold	Silver	Bronze	Total
1	Kazakhstan	6	2	5	13
2	India	5	3	8	16
3	Uzbekistan	3	4	4	11
4	China	2	1	5	8
5	Chinese Taipei	1	1	2	4
5	Japan	1	1	2	4
5	Thailand	1	1	2	4
8	Jordan	1	1	1	3
9	North Korea	0	3	0	3
10	Mongolia*	0	2	3	5
11	Tajikistan	0	1	2	3
12	South Korea	0	0	2	2
13	Philippines	0	0	1	1
13	Turkmenistan	0	0	1	1
Totals (14 entries)		20	20	38	78
