= Boxing at the 2026 Asian Games – Men's 55 kg =

Boxing competitions

Men's 55 kg at the 2026 Asian Games
- Venue: Nishio City Gymnasium
- Date: 22 September – 2 October 2026
- Competitors: 24 from 24 nations

Medalists
gold medal	Rui Yamaguchi	Japan
silver medal	Carlo Paalam	Philippines
bronze medal	Makhmud Sabyrkhan	Kazakhstan
bronze medal	Kharkhüügiin Bilgüünsaikhan	Mongolia

The men's 55 kilograms event at the 2026 Asian Games took place from 22 September to 2 October 2026 at the Nishio City Gymnasium, Nishio, Aichi Prefecture, Japan.

The gold medal was won by the host nation's Rui Yamaguchi, who defeated the Philippines' Carlo Paalam by a 3–2 split decision in the final. Makhmud Sabyrkhan of Kazakhstan and Kharkhüügiin Bilgüünsaikhan of Mongolia took the bronze medals.

== Schedule ==
All times are Japan Standard Time (UTC+09:00)

Date	Time	Event
Tuesday, 22 September 2026	17:00	Round of 32
Saturday, 26 September 2026	13:00	Round of 16
Monday, 28 September 2026	18:00	Quarterfinals
Wednesday, 30 September 2026	14:30	Semifinals
Friday, 2 October 2026	13:45	Final

== Results ==
Legend

- RSC — Won by referee stop contest
- WO — Won by walkover

=== Final ===
Final
Carlo Paalam (PHI)	2
Rui Yamaguchi (JPN)	3

=== Top half ===
Round of 32
Mehdi Kazemi (IRI)	4
So Chon-ryong (PRK)	1
Rukmal Prasanna (SRI)
Abbas Qasim (IRQ)	RSC
Sumama Rehman (PAK)	0
Meroj Sufijonov (TJK)	5
Jadumani Singh Mandengbam (IND)	5
Chandra Bahadur Thapa (NEP)	0

Round of 16
Makhmud Sabyrkhan (KAZ)	5
Mehdi Kazemi (IRI)	0
Abbas Qasim (IRQ)
Shin Jae-yong (KOR)	WO
Zhang Jiamao (CHN)	5
Meroj Sufijonov (TJK)	0
Jadumani Singh Mandengbam (IND)	0
Carlo Paalam (PHI)	3

Quarterfinals
Makhmud Sabyrkhan (KAZ)	3
Shin Jae-yong (KOR)	1
Zhang Jiamao (CHN)	2
Carlo Paalam (PHI)	3

Semifinals
Makhmud Sabyrkhan (KAZ)	2
Carlo Paalam (PHI)	3

=== Bottom half ===
Round of 32
Migma Dorji (BHU)	0
Utshob Ahmed (BAN)	5
Kangpi Bokhunthod (THA)	5
Daniýar Rozmetow (TKM)	0
Huthaifa Eshish (JOR)	RSC
Vanesy Heuangthisouan (LAO)
Jill Mandagie (INA)	1
Zafarbek Kamilov (KGZ)	4

Round of 16
Kharkhüügiin Bilgüünsaikhan (MGL)	5
Utshob Ahmed (BAN)	0
Kangpi Bokhunthod (THA)	3
Samandar Olimov (UZB)	2
Peng Chia-feng (TPE)	1
Huthaifa Eshish (JOR)	4
Zafarbek Kamilov (KGZ)	0
Rui Yamaguchi (JPN)	5

Quarterfinals
Kharkhüügiin Bilgüünsaikhan (MGL)	5
Kangpi Bokhunthod (THA)	0
Huthaifa Eshish (JOR)	0
Rui Yamaguchi (JPN)	5

Semifinals
Kharkhüügiin Bilgüünsaikhan (MGL)	0
Rui Yamaguchi (JPN)	5
