= Boxing at the 2023 Pan American Games – Men's 51 kg =

Men's 51 kg at the 2023 Pan American Games
- Venue: Olympic Training Center
- Start date: October 21, 2023
- End date: October 27, 2023
- Competitors: 14 from 14 nations

Medalists
Gold medal	Junior Alcántara	Dominican Republic
Silver medal	Michael Trindade	Brazil
Bronze medal	Roscoe Hill	United States
Bronze medal	Ramón Quiroga	Argentina

The Men's 51 kg competition of the boxing events at the 2023 Pan American Games in Santiago, Chile, was held between October 21 and 27 at the Olympic Training Center. A total of 14 boxers from 14 NOC's competed.

The two finalists will qualify for the 2024 Summer Olympics in Paris, France.

== Qualification ==
There was a quota of 130 boxers to compete at the games (ten per event). The host nation (Chile) received automatic qualification spots for all events. The remainder of the spots were awarded through various qualifying tournaments. However, the International Olympic Committee later decided the competition was an open registration event, meaning any NOC could enter a boxer into the event.

== Competition format ==
Like all Pan American boxing events, the competition is a straight single-elimination tournament. Both semifinal losers are awarded bronze medals, so no boxers compete again after their first loss. Bouts consist of 3 rounds "10-point must" scoring system used, where the winner of each round must be awarded 10 points and the loser a lesser amount, and the elimination of the padded headgear. Five judges scored each bout. The winner will be the boxer who scored the most at the end of the match.

== Results ==
Round of 16 (October 21)
Junior Alcántara (DOM)	5
Justin Parina (CAN)	0
Jaleel Jokhu (TTO)	L
Yuberjen Martínez (COL)	W
Alejandro Claro (CUB)	2
Roscoe Hill (USA)	3
Michael Trindade (BRA)	5
Hansell López (EAI)	0
Keymberth González (VEN)	5
Jabali Breedy (BAR)	0
Ramón Quiroga (ARG)	5
Héctor Fabián Tapia Cerda (CHI)	0

Quarterfinals (October 24)
Óscar Castañeda (MEX)	0
Junior Alcántara (DOM)	3
Yuberjen Martínez (COL)	1
Roscoe Hill (USA)	4
Michael Trindade (BRA)	3
Keymberth González (VEN)	2
Ramón Quiroga (ARG)	4
Luis Fernando Delgado (ECU)	1

Semifinals (October 26)
Junior Alcántara (DOM)	4
Roscoe Hill (USA)	1
Michael Trindade (BRA)	4
Ramón Quiroga (ARG)	1

Final (October 27)
Junior Alcántara (DOM)	WO
Michael Trindade (BRA)
