= Liu Chuang =

Liu Chuang may refer to:

- Liu Chuang (artist) (born 1979), Chinese artist
- Liu Chuang (boxer) (born 2000), Chinese boxer
- Liu Chuang (judoka) (born 1974), Chinese judoka
- Liu Chuang (snooker player) (born 1990), Chinese snooker player
