= Juan Manuel López Jr. =

Puerto Rican boxer

Juanma López
Personal information
- Nicknames: Juanmita López; Juanma López
- Born: Juanma López de Jesús; December 27, 2005 (age 20) Caguas, Puerto Rico
- Height: 5 ft 4 in (163 cm)
- Weight: Flyweight

Boxing career
- Reach: 67 in (170 cm)
- Stance: Southpaw

Boxing record
- Total fights: 7
- Wins: 7
- Win by KO: 3
- Losses: 0
Medal record
Men's amateur boxing
Representing Puerto Rico
IBA Youth World Boxing Championships
Bronze medal – third place	2022 La Nucia, Spain

Juanma López de Jesús (born December 27, 2005), often known by his nickname "Juanmita", is a Puerto Rican professional boxer. As a juvenile he was a multiple-time national champion and medalist at the 2022 IBA Youth World Boxing Championships as a minimumweight and light flyweight. López qualified to the 2024 Summer Olympics by winning Section 3 of the flyweight (51 kg) division of the 2024 World Boxing Olympic Qualification Tournament 1.

== Early life ==
López is the son of Juan Manuel López, a 2004 Olympic boxer and former two-division world champion whose career spanned the 2000s and 2010s, and Bárbara de Jesús. Like his father, he was named after his grandfather. López and his sister, Belissa, were born during a decade-long prenuptial relationship, which ended after a brief marriage. Due to his constant exposure to boxing, he was always interested in practicing, being often seen in the gym. López began mimicking other boxers when he was four years old. However, his father tried to veer him away, enrolling him in other sports including karate, baseball and basketball. These ultimately failed to capture López's long term interest and by his own admission, he did not excel in either. His mother supported the decision to become a boxer, with some resistance from his father. López officially began training when he was six years old, making headlines in 2012. He shared his father's team at José Aponte Gymnasium at Caguas, Puerto Rico, where Belissa also trained. There, his sparring partners were often professional boxers, such as World Boxing Organization (WBO) minimumweight world champion Oscar Collazo, complementing his formation by participating in camps abroad. Even as a teenager, López also enjoyed studying his father’s fights and scouting videos of his opponents, being regarded by longstanding trainer Álex Caraballo as a student of the sport. However, he was concerned with “living under [his predecessor’s] shadow”, fashioning his boxing style to be different and more technical in order to “forge [his] own path”.

== Amateur career ==
=== Youth tournaments ===
López made his amateur debut on October 11, 2015, winning his first bout. He was successful during the early part of his career, during which he competed in local tournaments. On August 9, 2016, López won a Puerto Rico vs. Florida match. In 2019, López finished second in his youth division at the Puerto Rico National Championships. On July 10, 2019, López won his division at the Billy Thompson Tournament. He finished the year by defeating the Dominican Representative at the República Dominicana vs. Puerto Rico tournament held on December 6, 2019. The COVID-19 pandemic halted sports in Puerto Rico for some time, during which López was a student-athlete at the Albergue Olímpico school at Salinas from which he graduated with honors. While attending this institution, he won the Juegos de Puerto Rico, organized by the Department of Sports and Recreation (DRD). In October 2021, López entered the XI Copa Cinturón de Oro, advancing by defeating Alan Dumacela of Ecuador (5:0). He won the juvenile 48 kg division by defeating Anthony Pupiales of Ecuador (5:0). On January 25, 2022, López became the Puerto Rico Youth National Champion. At the Copa Independencia, an exhibition tournament for the national team, López finished second. The first week of April 2022, he won the Torneo de Desarrollo and Torneo de Barranquitas, both local events. During the summer, López won the Puerto Rico International Cup and Copa Olímpica. López competed at the minimumweight division (46–48 kg) of the 2022 IBA Youth Boxing Championships, winning his debut over Luka Beshliogli of Georgia (5:0). In his next fight, he defeated Csaba Zsigo of Hungary by third-round stoppage. López outpointed Talat Yagli of Turkey (5:0) to advance. He secured the bronce medal, losing to Vishvanath Suresh of India by decision 1:4. The Puerto Rico Olympic Committee (COPUR) gave him the 2022 Best Amateur Boxer Award for his performance during the year. In February 2023, he repeated as youth national champion. In June 2023, López entered the Puerto Rico International Cup, where he represented his gym and won the flyweight division by defeating incumbent youth flyweight world champion Ari Bonilla of Mexico (3:2).

=== Adult competition, Olympics ===
After winning a bronze medal at the Continental Championship, the Federation began considering him and Carlos de León as top priority for the upcoming Olympic trials, integrating both to the training sessions of the senior national team despite neither being 18 years old at the moment. In December 2023, López won the adult Puerto Rico National Championship at the Juan Evangelista Venegas Tournament, winning the opportunity to fight for a berth at Paris 2024. In his senior debut he bested former national flyweight champion Yadiel Díaz (3:2). López, who had gathered an amateur record of 55-10 (5 Kos) which included a three year undefeated streak in Puerto Rico, joined the adult national team despite not meeting the minimum age requirement until the last week of that month. In March, López entered the 2024 World Boxing Olympic Qualification Tournament 1, receiving a bye for the first round. He was then matched against Dmytro Zamotayev of Ukraine, winning with scores of 4:1. In Round 3, López outpointed Ramón Quiroga of Argentina (4:1). In the final, he defeated Kim Inkyu of South Korea (3:2), to secure his classification. By winning this berth, López established several records within the Puerto Rico National Boxing Program, becoming the youngest boxer (at age 18) to join the Olympic boxing delegation. Along López Sr., he is also part of the first father-son Olympic duo in the program, a feat that they celebrated by tattooing the five rings on their arms. Immediately after classifying, López began an intensive five-month training. In June, he joined Ashleyann Lozada at Europe to participate in camps at Granada, Madrid and Dijon, before finally traveling to Paris.

Due to his age, López was considering staying for another Olympic cycle, something that the COPUR wholly expected as he was a cornerstone of its boxing program. Besides Los Angeles 2028, López had expressed interest in participating in the 2026 Central American and Caribbean Games and 2027 Pan American Games, since due to age requirements he was unable to participate in the previous editions of both tournaments, both held in 2023 (in San Salvador and Santiago, respectively). At the end of the qualifying period for Paris, he was the youngest member of all the Puerto Rico delegation. At the Olympic tournament, López was paired against Rio 2016 gold medalist and incumbent IBA World Champion Hasanboy Dusmatov of Uzbekistan, dropping a decision to the eventual tournament champion. Ultimately, the uncertain status of boxing for Los Angeles 2028 and the pending approval of World Boxing as an Olympic regulatory body derailed these plans.

== Professional career ==
On September 25, 2024, Top Rank announced that it had signed López to a professional contract. The banner, which also represented his father in the past, announced that he would see action within months, competing in the junior bantamweight class. On February 14, 2025, López defeated Bryan Santiago by first-round knockout in his professional debut at Madison Square Garden. Top Rank decided to fast track his career, establishing a plan for five to six fights during the first year.

== Professional boxing record ==
6 fights	6 wins	0 losses
By knockout	3	0
By decision	3	0
By disqualification	0	0

No.	Result	Record	Opponent	Type	Round, time	Date	Location	Notes
7						15 Aug 2026	Coliseo Roger Luis Mendoza Vidal, Caguas, Puerto Rico	
6	Win	6–0	Alberto Motos	KO	1 (6), 2:05	27 Jun 2026	Barclays Center, New York Citt, New York, U.S.	
5	Win	5–0	Conner Russel Goade	UD	6	31 Jan 2026	José Miguel Agrelot Coliseum, San Juan, Puerto Rico	
4	Win	4–0	Luis Morales	UD	6	27 Sep 2025	Osceola Heritage Park Events Center, Kissimmee, Florida, U.S.	
3	Win	3–0	Jorge Luis Gonzalez-Sanchez	TKO	2 (4), 1:14	26 Jul 2025	Madison Square Garden Theater, New York City, New York, U.S.	
2	Win	2–0	Malik Quinones	SD	4	5 Apr 2025	Coliseo José "Marrón" Aponte, Aibonito, Puerto Rico	
1	Win	1–0	Bryan Santiago	KO	1 (4), 0:59	14 Feb 2025	Madison Square Garden Theater, New York City, New York, U.S.	
