= 2023 IBA World Boxing Championships – Bantamweight =

Bantamweight at the 2023 IBA World Boxing Championships
- Venue: Humo Arena
- Location: Tashkent, Uzbekistan
- Dates: 3–14 May
- Competitors: 33 from 33 nations

Medalists
gold medal	Makhmud Sabyrkhan	Kazakhstan
silver medal	Oybek Juraev	Uzbekistan
bronze medal	Yosvany Veitía	Cuba
bronze medal	Dmitry Dvali	Russia

The Bantamweight competition at the 2023 IBA Men's World Boxing Championships was held between 3 and 14 May 2023.

== Results ==
=== Finals ===
Semifinals
(Kazakhstan) Makhmud Sabyrkhan	5
(Cuba) Yosvany Veitía	0
(Russia) Dmitrii Dvali	2
(Uzbekistan) Oybek Juraev	5

Final
(Kazakhstan) Makhmud Sabyrkhan	5
(Uzbekistan) Oybek Juraev	0

=== Top half ===
==== Section 1 ====
Round of 64
(Turkmenistan) Döwlet Muhanow	0
(Hungary) István Szaka	5

Round of 32
(Kazakhstan) Makhmud Sabyrkhan	5
(Hungary) István Szaka	0
(India) Sachin Siwach	5
(Moldova) Serghei Novac	0
(Indonesia) Rejeki Manalu
(Ghana) Amadu Mohammed	RSC
(Dominican Republic) Yan Pérez	0
(Botswana) George Molwantwa	5

Round of 16
(Kazakhstan) Makhmud Sabyrkhan	5
(India) Sachin Siwach	0
(Ghana) Amadu Mohammed	4
(Botswana) George Molwantwa	3

Quarterfinals
(Kazakhstan) Makhmud Sabyrkhan	5
(Ghana) Amadu Mohammed	0

==== Section 2 ====
Round of 64

Round of 32
(Cuba) Yosvany Veitía	5
(Kenya) Shaffi Bakari	0
(Mongolia) Dorjnyambuugiin Ganbold	2
(Turkey) Enver Muzaffer	5
(Azerbaijan) Nijat Huseynov	5
(Chinese Taipei) Hsu Po-hao	0
(Armenia) Ruslan Aslikyan	0
(Venezuela) Yoel Finol	5

Round of 16
(Cuba) Yosvany Veitía	5
(Turkey) Enver Muzaffer	0
(Azerbaijan) Nijat Huseynov	3
(Venezuela) Yoel Finol	4

Quarterfinals
(Cuba) Yosvany Veitía	4
(Venezuela) Yoel Finol	1

=== Bottom half ===
==== Section 3 ====
Round of 64

Round of 32
(Kyrgyzstan) Sanzhai Seidekmatov	4
(Australia) Emmanuel Shemeza	1
(Zimbabwe) Hillary Joel	5
(South Korea) Lee Soo-min	0
(Afghanistan) Mohammed Yaqoubi	0
(Japan) Shogo Tanaka	5
(Jordan) Zaid Al-Bitar	0
(Russia) Dmitrii Dvali	5

Round of 16
(Kyrgyzstan) Sanzhai Seidekmatov	RSC
(Zimbabwe) Hillary Joel
(Japan) Shogo Tanaka	0
(Russia) Dmitrii Dvali	5

Quarterfinals
(Kyrgyzstan) Sanzhai Seidekmatov	1
(Russia) Dmitrii Dvali	4

==== Section 4 ====
Round of 64

Round of 32
(Serbia) Tamir Galanov	0
(Uzbekistan) Oybek Juraev	5
(Albania) Ariol Zeneli	RSC
(Comoros) Ahmed Soufiane
(Tajikistan) Meroj Zoidov	5
(Bulgaria) Yasen Radev	2
(France) Ibrahim Boukedim	1
(Spain) Gabriel Escobar	4

Round of 16
(Uzbekistan) Oybek Juraev	5
(Albania) Ariol Zeneli	0
(Tajikistan) Meroj Zoidov	2
(Spain) Gabriel Escobar	5

Quarterfinals
(Uzbekistan) Oybek Juraev	5
(Spain) Gabriel Escobar	0
