= Dmitry Dvali =

Russian boxer

Personal information
- Other names: Dmitrii Dvali
- Nationality: Russia

Boxing career
Medal record
Men's amateur boxing
Representing Russia
IBA World Championships
Bronze medal – third place	2023 Tashkent	Bantamweight
European Championships
Gold medal – first place	2024 Belgrade	Bantamweight

Dmitry Yurevich Dvali (Russian: Дмитрий Юрьевич Двали; born 8 September 2000) is a Russian boxer. He competed at the 2023 IBA Men's World Boxing Championships, winning the bronze medal in the bantamweight event. He also competed at the 2024 European Amateur Boxing Championships, winning the gold medal in the same event.

Dvali was born in 2000 in Balashikha.

In August 2024, he, his brother, Yury and cornerman Evgeniy stopped a gang in Crimea who were in the process of assaulting a young man. He was critically injured during the fight, stopping it, but sustaining severe blunt force trauma. His eye socket and nose were broken. After surgery, his eye, which was at risk of being lost, was saved. His attackers were given various sentences to be served in a penal colony.
