= Euri Cedeño =

Dominican boxer (born 1999)

Personal information
- Nationality: Dominican
- Born: Euri Cedeño Martínez; 1 November 1999 (age 26) La Romana, Dominican Republic

Boxing career
- Weight class: Middleweight

Boxing record
- Total fights: 16
- Wins: 14
- Win by KO: 12
- Losses: 1
- Draws: 1
Medal record
Men's amateur boxing
Representing Dominican Republic
Central American and Caribbean Games
Bronze medal – third place	2018 Barranquilla	Middleweight
Bolivarian Games
Gold medal – first place	2022 Valledupar	Middleweight

Euri Cedeño Martínez (born November 1, 1999, in La Romana) is a boxer from the Dominican Republic. He competed at the 2020 Summer Olympics.

== Personal life ==
Cedeño weighs 60 kilograms (130 lb) and was born on November 1, 1999 in La Romana.

His father, Aquino Cedeño Severino, was a boxing trainer. He has a younger brother, Hendri who participated in the 64 kg boxing category of the 2019 Pan American Games and a sister, Imbel, who was also a boxer. Cedeño is a private from the Air Force of the Dominican Republic and is a southpaw.

== Career ==
=== 2016 ===
Cedeño won the silver medal in the Youth Pan American Championship held in Garabito, Costa Rica, when he lost 0–3 to Nicaraguan Rommel Caballero.

At Sibur Arena, Saint Petersburg, he participated in November at the Youth World Championships, defeating by technical knockout the Moldovan Alexandru Paraschiv but was defeated in the round of 16 by Ankush Dahiya from India.

=== 2017 ===
He was awarded Boxing Athlete of the Year from his native city council and Sport Union.

=== 2018 ===
He lost 0–5 to Diego Moreno in the Central American and Caribbean Games qualifier held in Tijuana, nonetheless, he was selected to participate in the games. During the Central American and Caribbean Games he won 5–0 to Trinidadian and Tobagonian representative Aaron Solomón Prince before falling 1–4 to the 2014 Central American and Caribbean and 2016 Olympic Champion Cuban Arlen López to earn the bronze medal.

Cedeño defeated the Dominican Adonis Johnson, winning the gold medal at the Romana Cup.

=== 2019 ===
He participated in the XXXVIII Independence Cup held in the Dominican city of Santiago de los Caballeros, defeating 5–0 to the Ecuadorian Bryan Angulo to win the gold medal.

He qualified for 2019 Pan American Games with victories over Chilean Diego Guerra and Aaron Prince from Trinidad and Tobago before losing from Cuban Arlen López when he was not able to contest the semifinal bout for injury reasons, winning the bronze medal.

Under the guidance of the Cuban Armando Hernández, National Head Coach, he claimed to be getting ready to bring a medal to his home country, especially preparing to face his biggest rival, Cuban Arlen López. In the games, Cedeño was drafted along with Cuban Arlen López in the 75 kg category quarterfinals, with Cedeño losing the bout 1–4.

He competed in Yekaterinburg, Russia at the World Championships where he and his team arrived late when the tournament already have started, nonetheless, he started winning over Croatian Mladen Sobjeslavski 5–0 in the first round, a win by Referee Stop the Combat by opponent injury against the Swedish Adam Chartoi in the second round and finally falling 1–4 to Cuban Arlen López in the third round.

During the Romana Cup, Euri Cedeño win over Mexican Héctor Aguirre to secure the gold medal.

=== 2021 ===
After the cancellation of the 2021 Pan American Qualification Tournament in Buenos Aires, Cedeño secured a 2020 Summer Olympics spot after being among the top five of his weight division based on the IOC's Boxing Task Force Rankings for the Americas.

As part of the preparations for the Summer Olympics, he participated in the International Boxing Tournament Konstantin Korotkov Memorial, there he lost to the Russian Dzhambulat Bizhamov. During the Tokyo 2020 Summer Olympics tournament, he defeated the Venezuelan athlete competing under the Refugee Olympic Team Eldric Sella when the referee stopped the contest after 67 seconds of the first round.

=== 2025 ===
Cedeno is scheduled to face Abel Mina in a middleweight bout at Norfolk Scope Arena in Norfolk, VA, on June 7, 2025.

== Professional boxing record ==
16 fights	14 wins	1 loss
By knockout	12	0
By decision	2	1
Draws	1	

No.	Result	Record	Opponent	Type	Round, time	Date	Location	Notes
16	Loss	14–1–1	Jahi Tucker	MD	10	Jun 27, 2026	Barclays Center, New York City, New York, U.S.	For vacant WBC-USNBC, IBF North American and WBO-NABO middleweight titles
15	Win	14–0–1	Etoundi Michel William	UD	10	Jan 31, 2026	José Miguel Agrelot Coliseum, San Juan, Puerto Rico	
14	Win	13–0–1	Luis Eduardo Florez	TKO	2 (10) 1:42	Sep 5, 2025	Wind Creek Events Center, Bethlehem, Pennsylvania, U.S.	
13	Win	12–0–1	Abel Mina	RTD	5 (10), 3:00	Jun 7, 2025	Norfolk Scope, Norfolk, Virginia, U.S.	
12	Win	11–0–1	Ulices Tovar	KO	1 (8) 2:35	Mar 14, 2025	Wind Creek Events Center, Bethlehem, Pennsylvania, U.S.	
11	Win	10–0–1	Aro Schwartz	TKO	2 (8) 0:43	Sep 20, 2024	Wind Creek Events Center, Bethlehem, Pennsylvania, U.S.	
10	Win	9–0–1	Dormedes Potes	KO	1 (8) 0:58	Jun 29, 2024	James L. Knight Center, Miami, Florida, U.S.	
9	Win	8–0–1	Antonio Todd	TKO	5 (8) 2:39	Feb 16, 2024	Madison Square Garden Theater, New York City, New York, U.S.	
8	Win	7–0–1	Yoanki Urrutia	UD	8	Dec 8, 2023	Caribe Royale Orlando, Orlando, Florida, U.S.	
7	Draw	6–0–1	Dayan Depestre	SD	6	Oct 27, 2023	Caribe Royale Orlando, Orlando, Florida, U.S.	
6	Win	6–0	Fabrizio Rubino	TKO	1 (6) 1:10	Aug 4, 2023	Wind Creek Events Center, Bethlehem, Pennsylvania, U.S.	
5	Win	5–0	William Townsel	TKO	1 (8) 1:41	Jul 8, 2023	The Ballroom, Boardwalk Hall, Atlantic City, New Jersey, U.S.	
4	Win	4–0	Adrian Perez	TKO	3 (8) 0:33	Feb 10, 2023	Coco Locos Restaurant Sports Bar, Sosúa, Dominican Republic	
3	Win	3–0	Julio de Jesus Rodriguez	TKO	2 (8)	Dec 16, 2022	Pabellon de Esgrima, Centro Olimpico, Santo Domingo, Dominican Republic	
2	Win	2–0	Abrahan Peralta	KO	1 (6) 1:59	Nov 4, 2022	Coliseo Carlos 'Teo' Cruz, Santo Domingo, Dominican Republic	
1	Win	1–0	Alexis Santana Sapelle	KO	1 (6) 3:00	Oct 9, 2022	Club Mauricio Baez, Santo Domingo, Dominican Republic	
