= Boxing at the 2018 Central American and Caribbean Games =

Boxing competitions

- Venue: Salon Jumbo del Country Club
- Location: (Colombia) Barranquilla
- Dates: 25 July – 2 August

The boxing competition at the 2018 Central American and Caribbean Games was held in Barranquilla, Colombia from 25 July to 2 August at the Salon Jumbo del Country Club.

== Medal summary ==
=== Men's events ===
Event	Gold	Silver	Bronze
Light Flyweight (-49kg)	Yuberjen Martínez (COL)	Mario Lavegar (DOM)	Yoali Mejia (MEX); Robinson Rodríguez (CRC)
Flyweight (-52kg)	Ceiber Ávila (COL)	Rodrigo Marte (DOM)	Miguel Capilla (MEX); Yankiel Rivera (PUR)
Bantamweight (-56kg)	Juan Reyes (GUA)	Jhon Martínez (COL)	Christian Jiménez (ESA); Alexy de la Cruz (DOM)
Lightweight (-60kg)	Lázaro Álvarez (CUB)	Michael Alexander (TTO)	Leonel de los Santos (DOM); Jonathan Miniel (PAN)
Light Welterweight (-64kg)	Andy Cruz (CUB)	Elvis Rodriguez (DOM)	John Gutierrez (COL); Roberto Zarinana (MEX)
Welterweight (-69kg)	Roniel Iglesias (CUB)	Bryan Polaco (PUR)	Rohan Polanco (DOM); Marcos Martínez (MEX)
Middleweight (-75kg)	Lester Martínez (GUA)	Arlen López (CUB)	Luis Rodríguez (PUR); Euri Cedeño (DOM)
Light Heavyweight (-81kg)	Julio César La Cruz (CUB)	Rogelio Romero (MEX)	Diego Motoa (COL); Osmar Bravo (NCA)
Heavyweight (-91kg)	Erislandy Savón (CUB)	Deivi Julio (COL)	Jeffry Gonzalez (NCA); Carlos Rodríguez (MEX)
Super Heavyweight (+91kg)	José Larduet (CUB)	Germán Heredia (MEX)	Nigel Paul (TTO); Raynery Vargas (DOM)

=== Women's events ===
Event	Gold	Silver	Bronze
Flyweight (-51kg)	Ingrit Valencia (COL)	Crisna Álvarez (MEX)	Julianna Rodríguez (CRC); Kathy Esquivel (NCA)
Bantamweight (-57kg)	Ashleyann Lozada (PUR)	Yeni Arias (COL)	Leilany Reyes (GUA); Estéfani Almánzar (DOM)
Lightweight (-60kg)	Esmeralda Falcón (MEX)	Elisa Williams (PAN)	Angelyris López (PUR); Eliana Medina (COL)
Light Welterweight (-64kg)	Guadalupe Solis (MEX)	Mirquin Sena (DOM)	Stephanie Pineiro (PUR); Kimberley Gittens (BAR)
Middleweight (-75kg)	Nisa Rodríguez (PUR)	Jessica Caicedo (COL)	María Moronta (DOM); Keyling Osejo (NCA)

== Medal table ==
* Host nation (Colombia)

Rank	Nation	Gold	Silver	Bronze	Total
1	Cuba (CUB)	6	1	0	7
2	Colombia (COL)*	3	4	3	10
3	Mexico (MEX)	2	3	5	10
4	Puerto Rico (PUR)	2	1	4	7
5	Guatemala (GUA)	2	0	1	3
6	Dominican Republic (DOM)	0	4	7	11
7	Panama (PAN)	0	1	1	2
8	Nicaragua (NCA)	0	0	4	4
9	Costa Rica (CRC)	0	0	2	2
10	Barbados (BAR)	0	0	1	1
10	El Salvador (ESA)	0	0	1	1
10	Trinidad and Tobago (TTO)	0	0	1	1
Totals (12 entries)		15	14	30	59
