= Guido Vianello =

Italian boxer (born 1994)

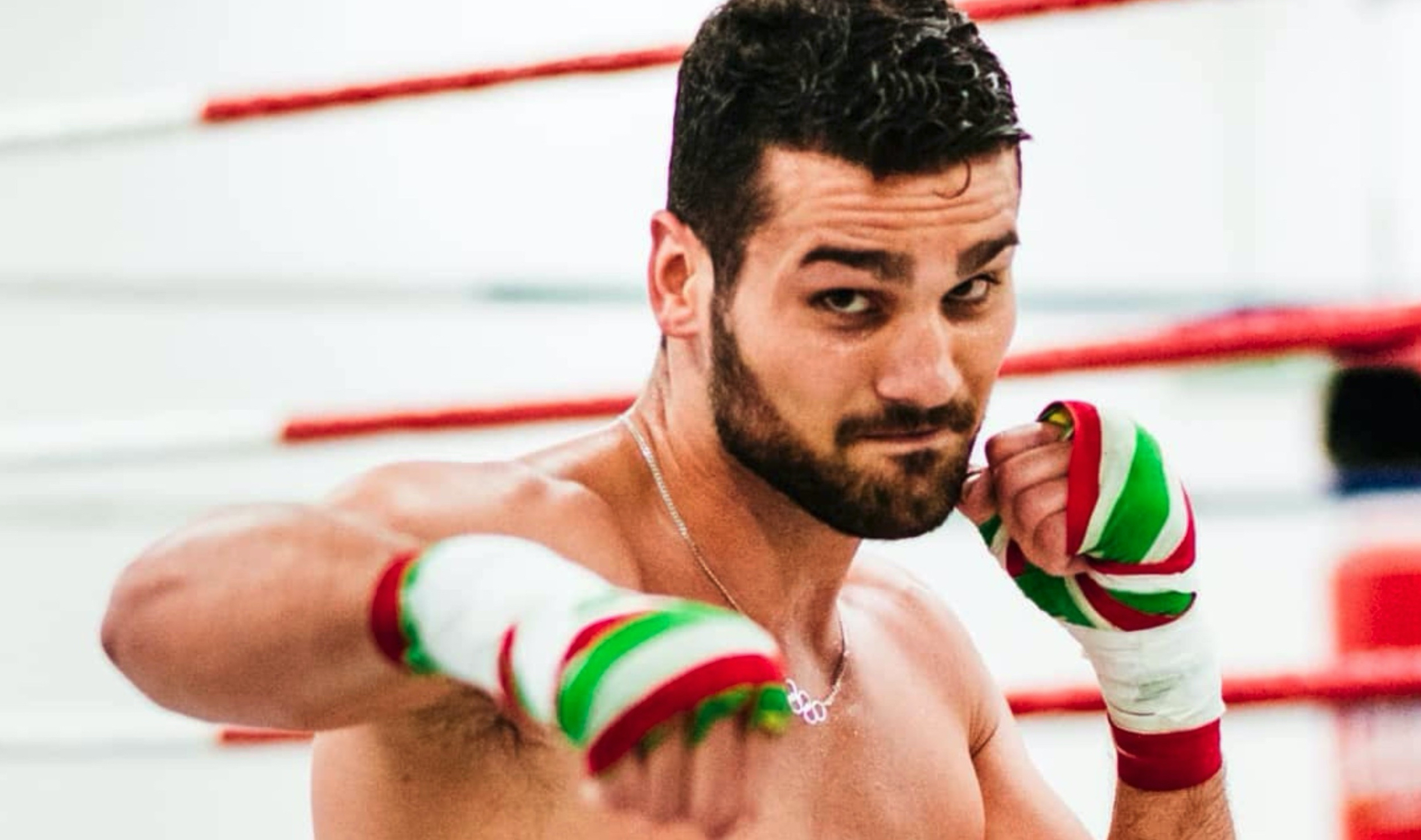
- Vianello in 2021

Personal information
- Nickname: The Gladiator
- Born: 9 May 1994 (age 32) Rome, Italy
- Height: 6 ft 6 in (198 cm)
- Weight: Heavyweight

Boxing career
- Stance: Orthodox

Boxing record
- Total fights: 19
- Wins: 14
- Win by KO: 12
- Losses: 3
- Draws: 2
Medal record
Men's amateur boxing
Representing Italy
EU Championships
| Silver medal – second place | 2014 Sofia | Super-heavyweight |

Guido Vianello (born 9 May 1994) is an Italian professional boxer. As an amateur, he represented his country at the 2016 Summer Olympics.

== Professional career ==
After an amateur career which included competing in the men's super-heavyweight event at the 2016 Summer Olympics, Vianello turned professional in 2018 and put together a record of 12–1–1 by the time he was scheduled to face Efe Ajagba for the WBC Silver heavyweight title on 13 April 2024 at American Bank Center in Corpus Christi, Texas, United States. He lost via split decision with the judges' scorecards reading 96–94, 94–96, 94–96.

Vianello defeated Arslanbek Makhmudov at Videotron Centre in Quebec City, Canada, on 17 August 2024 via eighth-round technical knockout when the fight was stopped on the advice of the ringside doctor due to significant swelling of his opponent's left eye.

He fought Richard Torrez for the vacant IBF North American, WBO-NABO, and WBC-NABF heavyweight titles on 5 April 2025 at Palms Casino Resort in Las Vegas, United States. Vianello lost by unanimous decision.

On 11 October 2025, Vianello faced undefeated Alexis Barriere for the vacant WBC Continental Americas title at Xfinity Mobile Arena in Philadelphia, United States. The fight was on the undercard of Jaron Ennis vs. Uisma Lima, and was evenly contested for the first three rounds. However, Vianello knocked Barriere down in the fourth round and finished the job in the following round to win the title.

In July 2026, Vianello signed a promotional contract with Frank Warren's Queensbury Promotions. In his promotional debut, he faced Moses Jolly over eight-rounds at The O2 Arena in London, England, on 29 August 2026. The fight ended in a 76–76 draw.

== Personal life ==
Vianello was an athlete of the Gruppo Sportivo Forestale from 2013 to 2016. From 1 January 2017, the G.S. Forestale merged with the Centro Sportivo Carabinieri, therefore Vianello became an athlete of the C.S. Carabinieri.

== Professional boxing record ==
| 19 fights | 14 wins | 3 losses |
|---|---|---|
| By knockout | 12 | 1 |
| By decision | 2 | 2 |
| Draws | 2 | |

| No. | Result | Record | Opponent | Type | Round, time | Date | Location | Notes |
|---|---|---|---|---|---|---|---|---|
| 19 | Draw | 14–3–2 | Moses Jolly | PTS | 8 | 29 Aug 2026 | The O2 Arena, London, England | |
| 18 | Win | 14–3–1 | Alexis Barriere | KO | 5 (10), 0:26 | 11 Oct 2025 | Xfinity Mobile Arena, Philadelphia, Pennsylvania, US | Won vacant WBC Continental Americas heavyweight title |
| 17 | Loss | 13–3–1 | Richard Torrez | UD | 10 | 5 Apr 2025 | Palms Casino Resort, Las Vegas, Nevada, US | For vacant IBF North American, WBO-NABO, and WBC-NABF heavyweight titles |
| 16 | Win | 13–2–1 | Arslanbek Makhmudov | TKO | 8 (10), 2:58 | 17 Aug 2024 | Videotron Centre, Quebec City, Canada | |
| 15 | Loss | 12–2–1 | Efe Ajagba | SD | 10 | 13 Apr 2024 | American Bank Center, Corpus Christi, Texas, US | For WBC Silver heavyweight title |
| 14 | Win | 12–1–1 | Moses Johnson | TKO | 1 (8), 2:59 | 16 Feb 2024 | The Theater at Madison Square Garden, New York City, New York, US | |
| 13 | Win | 11–1–1 | Curtis Harper | UD | 8 | 14 Oct 2023 | Fort Bend Epicenter, Rosenberg, Texas, US | |
| 12 | Loss | 10–1–1 | Jonathan Rice | TKO | 7 (10), 0:40 | 14 Jan 2023 | Turning Stone Resort Casino, Verona, New York, US | |
| 11 | Win | 10–0–1 | Jay Macfarlane | UD | 8 | 28 Oct 2022 | Pala Atlantico, Rome, Italy | |
| 10 | Win | 9–0–1 | Rafael Rios | TKO | 4 (8), 2:59 | 23 Jul 2022 | Grand Casino Hinckley, Minnesota, US | |
| 9 | Win | 8–0–1 | Marlon Williams | TKO | 2 (4), 0:01 | 26 Jun 2021 | Virgin Hotels Las Vegas, Paradise, Nevada, US | |
| 8 | Draw | 7–0–1 | Kingsley Ibeh | MD | 6 | 3 Oct 2020 | MGM Grand Conference Center, Paradise, Nevada, US | |
| 7 | Win | 7–0 | Don Haynesworth | TKO | 1 (6), 2:15 | 9 Jun 2020 | MGM Grand Conference Center, Paradise, Nevada, US | |
| 6 | Win | 6–0 | Colby Madison | KO | 1 (6), 0:44 | 30 Nov 2019 | Cosmopolitan of Las Vegas, Paradise, Nevada, US | |
| 5 | Win | 5–0 | Cassius Anderson | RTD | 3 (4), 3:00 | 14 Sep 2019 | T-Mobile Arena, Paradise, Nevada, US | |
| 4 | Win | 4–0 | Keenan Hickmon | TKO | 2 (6), 2:22 | 15 Jun 2019 | MGM Grand Garden Arena, Paradise, Nevada, US | |
| 3 | Win | 3–0 | Lawrence Gabriel | KO | 1 (6), 0:49 | 12 Apr 2019 | Staples Center, Los Angeles, California, US | |
| 2 | Win | 2–0 | Andrew Satterfield | KO | 1 (6), 1:54 | 10 Feb 2019 | Save Mart Center, Fresno, California, US | |
| 1 | Win | 1–0 | Luke Lyons | KO | 2 (6), 0:29 | 8 Dec 2018 | Hulu Theater, New York City, New York, US | |
