= Ankushita Boro =

Indian boxer

- Boro with Pwilao Basumatary at 2nd India Open International Boxing Tournament Guwahati

Personal information
- Nationality: Indian
- Born: Ankushita Boro; 6 October 2000 (age 26) Meghai Jarani Gaon, Assam, India
- Weight: Welterweight (64 kg)

Boxing career
- Stance: Orthodox
Medal record
Women's amateur boxing
Representing India
Asian Championships
Bronze medal – third place	2022 Amman	Welterweight
Asian Elite Championships
Bronze medal – third place	2026 Ulaanbaatar	65 kg

Ankushita Boro is an Indian boxer. She won gold medal at the 2017 AIBA Youth Women's World Boxing Championships. She won gold medal in the first North East Olympic Games 2018, Imphal. She won silver medal at the 2nd India Open International Boxing Tournament and a gold at the 3rd Khelo India Youth Games (KYIG) 2020, both held in Guwahati. She also won 'The Best Boxer' title in the 2017 AIBA Youth Women's World Boxing Championships. She won bronze medal at the 5th Elite Women's National Boxing Championship in Hisar.

== Personal life ==
Boro was born to Rakesh Kumar, who is a primary school teacher, on probation and Ranjita, who is currently working with an NGO. She hails from Meghai Jarani, a village in Sonitpur district, Assam. They helped Ankushita travel 165 km for the trials at the Sports Authority of India (SAI) centre in Golaghat. She trained from SAI Centre Golaghat with Trideep Bora as her coach. For Boro, boxing started by accident, when a friend asked her to compete in a local tournament, when she was just 12. She travelled 165 km for trials at the Sports Authority of India (SAI), centre in Golaghat. After the selection at the SAI, was under the guidance of coach Trideep Bora. She learnt better technique from Italian coach Raffael Bergamasco. As of November 2017, Boro is a student of Dakshin Junior College in Guwahati. Boro married her longtime coach Trideep Borah at Tezpur.

== Achievements ==
She won her district's Best Boxer Award in 2013, and a gold medal for her state in 2015. In early 2017, she earned a bronze medal in the National Youth Championship. In both the Balkan Youth International Boxing Championship (Bulgaria) and Ahmet Comert Championships (Turkey), she won a silver medal.

=== 2017 AIBA Youth Women's World Boxing Championships ===
On 26 November 2017, she earned a gold medal in the light welterweight (64 kilogram) category at the AIBA World Youth Women's Boxing Championship, with a unanimous win over Turkey's Aluc Cagla. Interestingly, she beat Aluc Cagla of Turkey in the first round, against whom she lost at the Ahmet Comret tournament and Rebecca Nicoli of Italy, against whom she lost in Bulgaria. Besides being one of India's five pugilists, who advanced to the finals, she was also adjudged the best boxer of the tournament.

=== 4th Elite Women's National Boxing Championship ===
In December 2019, Boro participated at the 4th Elite Women's National Boxing Championship held in Kannur, Kerala from 2–8 December 2019. She lost to Railways' Pwilao Basumatary in the finals for 64 kg title by 3–2.

=== Other achievements ===
In 2018, chief minister of Assam Sarbananda Sonowal appointed Boro as the brand ambassador of Beti Bachao, Beti Padhao scheme, Kamrup Metropolitan district.
