= Akhtem Zakirov =

Russian boxer

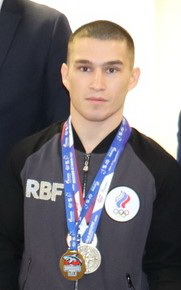
- Zakirov in 2021

Personal information
- Nationality: Russia

Boxing career
Medal record
Men's amateur boxing
Representing (Russia) Russian Boxing Federation
IBA World Championships
Bronze medal – third place	2021 Belgrade	Flyweight

Akhtem Zakirov is a Russian boxer. He competed at the 2021 AIBA World Boxing Championships, winning the bronze medal in the flyweight event.
