= Thanarat Saengphet =

Thai boxer (born 2002)

Personal information
- Nationality: Thailand
- Born: 19 August 2002 (age 23)

Boxing career
Medal record
Men's amateur boxing
Representing Thailand Boxing Federation
IBA World Championships
Bronze medal – third place	2021 Belgrade	Flyweight
Southeast Asian Games
Gold medal – first place	2023 Cambodia	Flyweight
Gold medal – first place	2025 Thailand	Bantamweight

Thanarat Saengphet (born 19 August 2002) is a Thai boxer. He competed at the 2021 AIBA World Boxing Championships, winning the bronze medal in the flyweight event.
