= Patsy Joyce =

Irish boxer

Personal information
- Nationality: Ireland
- Born: 2005 or 2006 (age 20–21)
- Relative: John Joe Joyce (uncle)

Boxing career
Medal record
Men's amateur boxing
Representing Ireland
World Championships
Bronze medal – third place	2025 Liverpool	55 kg

Patsy Joyce (born 2005/2006) is an Irish boxer. He competed at the 2025 World Boxing Championships, winning the bronze medal in the men's 55 kg event.
