= Michael Trindade =

Brazilian boxer (born 2000)

Personal information
- Nickname: Parazinho
- National team: Brazil
- Born: 18 November 2000 (age 25) Marituba, Pará, Brazil

Sport
- Country: Brazil
- Sport: Boxing
Medal record
Men's amateur boxing
Representing Brazil
Pan American Games
Silver medal – second place	2023 Santiago	-51 kg
South American Games
Bronze medal – third place	2026 Santa Fe	–55 kg

Michael Douglas da Silva Trindade (born 18 November 2000 in Marituba, Pará) is a Brazilian boxer.

== Career ==
Trindade began his boxing career in 2006. He was four-time champion of the state of Pará between 2017 and 2020. In 2021 he was called up to the Brazilian Boxing Confederation and competed in 2021 AIBA World Boxing Championships in Belgrade, Serbia (where he reached the quarterfinals), reaching 5th place in the world rankings. In 2022 he was Brazilian runner-up and won the bronze medal at the São Paulo Open Games.

At the 2023 IBA Men's World Boxing Championships held in Tashkent, Uzbekistan, he won his first fight but lost in the second one, in the Flyweight category.

At the 2023 Pan American Games held in Santiago, Chile, he reached the final of the 51 kg category, but had to abandon the gold medal fight, losing by WO, due to an old injury. Tridade has had an injury to the ulnar collateral ligament in his arm since 2021. He treated the injury, but felt pain again in the Pan-American quarterfinals. He fought the semifinal with difficulty and managed to secure the silver medal, and consequently, a place at the 2024 Olympic Games in Paris.

At the 2024 Summer Olympics, he lost in the first round.

At the 2025 World Boxing Championships, he lost in the first round.
