= 2021 AIBA World Boxing Championships – Flyweight =

Boxing competition

Flyweight at the 2021 AIBA World Boxing Championships
- Venue: Štark Arena
- Location: Belgrade, Serbia
- Dates: 26 October – 6 November
- Competitors: 32 from 32 nations

Medalists
gold medal	Saken Bibossinov	Kazakhstan
silver medal	Roscoe Hill	United States
bronze medal	Akhtem Zakirov
bronze medal	Thanarat Saengphet

The Flyweight competition at the 2021 AIBA World Boxing Championships was held from 26 October to 6 November 2021.

== Results ==
=== Finals ===
Semifinals
(United States) Roscoe Hill	5
Akhtem Zakirov	0
(Kazakhstan) Saken Bibossinov	4
Thanarat Saengphet	1

Final
(United States) Roscoe Hill	0
(Kazakhstan) Saken Bibossinov	5

=== Top half ===
==== Section 1 ====
First round
(Dominican Republic) Mario Lavegar
(United States) Roscoe Hill	RSC
(Armenia) Artur Hovhannisyan	5
(Germany) Argishti Terteryan	0
(Chinese Taipei) Tu Po-wei	0
(Brazil) Ronaldo Bezerra	5
(Italy) Federico Serra	w/o
Ramish Rahmani

Second round
(United States) Roscoe Hill	4
(Armenia) Artur Hovhannisyan	1
(Brazil) Ronaldo Bezerra	0
(Italy) Federico Serra	5

Quarterfinals
(United States) Roscoe Hill	4
(Italy) Federico Serra	1

==== Section 2 ====
First round
(Kenya) David Karanja	1
(Ecuador) Luis Delgado	4
(Georgia (country)) Nodari Darbaidze	5
(Ukraine) Oleksandr Korniv	0
(Hungary) Attila Bernáth	4
(Republic of Ireland) Sean Mari	1
Akhtem Zakirov	4
(Spain) Martín Molina	1

Second round
(Ecuador) Luis Delgado	4
(Georgia (country)) Nodari Darbaidze	0
(Hungary) Attila Bernáth	0
Akhtem Zakirov	5

Quarterfinals
(Ecuador) Luis Delgado	2
Akhtem Zakirov	3

=== Bottom half ===
==== Section 3 ====
First round
(Uzbekistan) Hasanboy Dusmatov	0
(Kazakhstan) Saken Bibossinov	5
(India) Deepak Bhoria	5
(Kyrgyzstan) Azat Usenaliev	0
(England) Kiaran MacDonald	0
(Colombia) Yuberjen Martínez	5
(Belarus) Dzianis Salotskikh	3
(Japan) Syogo Tanaka	2

Second round
(Kazakhstan) Saken Bibossinov	5
(India) Deepak Bhoria	0
(Colombia) Yuberjen Martínez	5
(Belarus) Dzianis Salotskikh	0

Quarterfinals
(Kazakhstan) Saken Bibossinov	3
(Colombia) Yuberjen Martínez	0

==== Section 4 ====
First round
(Puerto Rico) Yankiel Rivera	3
(Scotland) Lennon Mulligan	2
(Mongolia) Kharkhüügiin Enkhmandakh	1
(Azerbaijan) Masud Yusifzada	4
Thanarat Saengphet	5
(Guatemala) Carlos Ramírez	0
(Venezuela) Miguel Ramos	5
(Turkey) Ramazan Demir	0

Second round
(Puerto Rico) Yankiel Rivera	0
(Azerbaijan) Masud Yusifzada	5
Thanarat Saengphet	3
(Venezuela) Miguel Ramos	2

Quarterfinals
(Azerbaijan) Masud Yusifzada	0
Thanarat Saengphet	5
