= Kharkhüügiin Bilgüünsaikhan =

Mongolian boxer (born 2004)

Personal information
- Nationality: Mongolia
- Born: 6 June 2004 (age 22) Ulaanbaatar, Mongolia
- Height: 170 cm (5 ft 7 in)

Boxing career
- Weight class: 55 kg
Medal record
Men's amateur boxing
Representing Mongolia
World Cup
Silver medal – second place	2025 Warsaw	55 kg
Asian Games
Bronze medal – third place	Aichi–Nagoya 2026	55 kg
Asian Championships
Silver medal – second place	2026 Ulaanbaatar	55 kg

Kharkhüügiin Bilgüünsaikhan (Mongolian: Хархүүгийн Билгүүнсайхан; born June 6, 2004) is a Mongolian boxer.

== Career ==
Bilgüünsaikhan's debut took place at the Mongolian National Elite Championships which was held 22 Маrсh 2022 in Ulaanbaatar.

Bilgüünsaikhan received the silver medal in the men's 55 kg at the 2025 World Cup.

Bilgüünsaikhan competed in the men's 55 kg event at the 2025 World Championships, he beat the 2023 European Games bronze medallist Nebil Ibrahim (technical knockout), 2024 Olympic participant and two-time U22 European Champion Nijat Huseynov (unanimous decision), and lost to Rafael Lozano in the quarter-finals.

Bilgüünsaikhan held the silver medal in the men's 55 kg at the 2026 Asian Championships, defeating with the overwhelming advantage the reigning two-time World Champion Makhmud Sabyrkhan in the semifinal and losing final to Rui Yamaguchi.

At the 2026 Asian Games he won the bronze medal in the men's 55 kg, after defeating Каngpi Bokhunthod.
