= Alexis Barriere =

Canadian boxer (born 1995)

Personal information
- Born: 21 July 1995 (age 31) Quebec City, Canada
- Height: 193 cm (6 ft 4 in)
- Weight: Heavyweight

Boxing career
- Stance: Orthodox

Boxing record
- Total fights: 13
- Wins: 12
- Win by KO: 10
- Losses: 1

Alexis Barriere (born 21 July 1995) is a Canadian professional boxer who currently competes in the heavyweight division.

== Professional career ==
Barriere made his professional debut in 2021 where he scored a second round stoppage against fellow Canadian Colin Sangster. A regular sparring partner for former world champion Tyson Fury, he has been called a special fighter by Fury's manager Spencer Brown. Barriere claimed the first title of his career when he stopped Abokan Bokpe in four rounds to claim the Canadian Heavyweight title. On 28 February 2025, Barriere returned after a year and a half layoff to easily beat Ubaldo Resendiz. After dropping Resendiez twice in the sixth, Resendiz retired in his corner before the seventh round.

Barriere was scheduled to take on Roney Hines on the undercard of Richardson Hitchins vs. George Kambosos Jr in New York but had to withdraw after suffering an injury in sparring.

== Professional boxing record ==
13 fights	12 wins	1 loss
By knockout	10	1
By decision	2	0

No.	Result	Record	Opponent	Type	Round, time	Date	Location	Notes
13	Loss	12–1	(Italy) Guido Vianello	KO	5 (12), 0:26	11 Oct 2025	(United States) Xfinity Mobile Arena, Philadelphia, Pennsylvania, US	For vacant WBC Continental Americas Heavyweight Title
12	Win	12–0	(Mexico) Ubaldo Illagor Resendiz	RTD	6 (10), 3:00	28 Feb 2025	Hilton Lac Leamy, Gatineau, Canada	
11	Win	11–0	(Mexico) Guillermo Casas	TKO	1 (8), 2:32	13 Oct 2023	MTelus, Montreal, Canada	
10	Win	10–0	(United States) Mike Marshall	TKO	1 (8), 2:49	20 Apr 2023	Montreal Casino, Montreal, Canada	
9	Win	9–0	(Azerbaijan) Zamig Atakishiyev	UD	8	18 Mar 2023	Complexe Sportif Beau Chateau, Chateauguay, Canada	
8	Win	8–0	(Canada) Adam Braidwood	TKO	1 (8), 1:57	5 Nov 2022	L-P Gaucher Arena, Saint-Hyacinthe, Canada	
7	Win	7–0	(Canada) Abokan Bokpe	TKO	4 (8), 2:06	21 May 2022	Complexe Sportif Bell, Brossard, Canada	Won vacant Canadian Heavyweight Title
6	Win	6–0	(Mexico) Marco Antonio Canedo	TKO	5 (6), 2:51	25 Mar 2022	Colisee, Trois-Rivières, Canada	
5	Win	5–0	(Mexico) Israel Nava Lopez	RTD	2 (4), 3:00	11 Mar 2022	Montreal Casino, Montreal, Canada	
4	Win	4–0	(Mexico) Rafael Abdala Sanchez Rojas	UD	4	22 Oct 2021	Olympia Theatre, Montreal, Canada	
3	Win	3–0	(Mexico) Angel Gabriel Barron	TKO	2 (4), 1:57	28 Aug 2021	Stade IGA, Montreal, Canada	
2	Win	2–0	(United States) Drew Nolan	TKO	1 (4), 1:30	26 Jun 2021	(United States) New England Sports Center, Derry, New Hampshire, U.S.	
1	Win	1–0	(Canada) Colin Sangster	KO	2 (4), 1:20	16 Mar 2021	(United States) Hotel Plaza Quebec, Quebec City, Canada	
