= Guadalupe Solis =

Mexican boxer (born 1998)

Personal information
- Nationality: (Mexico) Mexican
- Born: 18 October 1998 (age 28)

Sport
- Sport: Boxing
- Weight class: Light-welterweight
Medal record
Women's amateur boxing
Representing Mexico
Central American and Caribbean Games
Gold medal – first place	2018 Barranquilla	64 kg

Guadalupe Solis (born 18 October 1998) is a Mexican boxer. She won the gold medal in the 64 kg division at the 2018 Central American and Caribbean Games. Solis unsuccessfully attempted to qualify for the 2024 Summer Olympics, losing in both global qualification tournaments. She was given a two-year suspension from boxing in April 2025 for failing to comply with anti-doping regulations by not accurately reporting her whereabouts in order to be available for unannounced drug tests three times in a 12-month period.
