= Rafael Lozano (boxer, born 2004) =

Spanish boxer (born 2004)

Personal information
- Nickname: Rafa
- Nationality: Spain
- Born: Rafael Lozano Serrano; 27 December 2004 (age 21) Córdoba, Spain
- Parent: Rafael Lozano Muñoz (father)

Boxing career
Medal record
Men's amateur boxing
Representing Spain
World Championships
Silver medal – second place	2025 Liverpool	55 kg
European Championships
Bronze medal – third place	2024 Belgrade	Flyweight
Mediterranean Games
Gold medal – first place	2026 Taranto	Bantamweight

Rafael Lozano Serrano (born 27 December 2004), also known as Rafael Lozano or Rafael Lozano Jr., is a Spanish boxer. He competed at the 2024 European Amateur Boxing Championships, winning the bronze medal in the flyweight event. He also competed at the 2024 Summer Olympics in the men's 51 kg event, but was defeated in the quarter-final by Yunior Alcántara Reyes.
