= Meghai Jarani Gaon =

- Village
- Interactive map of Meghai Jarani Gaon
- Country: India
- State: Assam
- District: Sonitpur

Area
  - Total: 196.24 ha (484.9 acres)

Population (2011)
  - Total: 923

Meghai Jarani Gaon is a village located in the Sonitpur district of Assam, India. According to the 2011 census, its population is 923; 496 males and 427 females, and its literacy rate is 57%. It is 196.24 hectares in area, and contains about 181 houses. The nearest town is Dhekiajuli, which is 17 km (11 mi) away.
