= Diego Lenzi =

Italian boxer (2001)

Diego Lenzi (born 29 May 2001) is an Italian boxer. He represented Italy at the 2024 Summer Olympics in the super heavyweight division. After defeating American Joshua Edwards he lost in the second round of the tournament to German Nelvie Tiafack. Lenzi made his professional debut on 15 December 2024 where he defeated Georgije Stanisavljev within 30 seconds.
