= Junior Alcántara =

Dominican Republic boxer (born 2004)

Personal information
- Full name: Junior Alcántara Reyes
- Nationality: Dominican
- Born: 2 October 2004 (age 21) Higüey, Dominican Republic

Sport
- Sport: Boxing
Medal record
Men's amateur boxing
Representing Dominican Republic
Olympic Games
Bronze medal – third place	2024 Paris	Flyweight
Pan American Games
Gold medal – first place	2023 Santiago	Flyweight
Central American and Caribbean Games
Gold medal – first place	2026 Santo Domingo	Flyweight
Silver medal – second place	2023 San Salvador	Flyweight

Junior Alcántara Reyes (born 2 October 2004) is a Dominican Republic boxer, Pan American Games champion and Central American Games silver medalist.

== Career ==
=== 2019 ===
He was gold medalist in the Dominican Republic School Sports Games, where he was discovered for the National Team.

=== 2022 ===
At the IBA Youth World Championships, he won 4–1 over Ukrainian Vladyslav Kondratiuk, but lost 1–4 to the Australian Jye Dixon.

=== 2023 ===
He participated in the IBA World Championships, defeating 5–0 to the Kenyan Abednego Kyalo, before losing 0–5 to the Japanese Kazuma Aratake in the round of 16 of the minimumweight category. Alcántara lost 0–5 to Colombian Yuberjen Martínez, to win the silver medal in the Central American and Caribbean Games. He gave his home country a gold medal in the boxing competition of the 2023 Pan American Games in the 51 kg category becoming the fourth gold medalist in boxing for the Dominican Republic. He also won a berth for the 2024 Summer Olympics in Paris, France.
