= Nishio City Gymnasium =

Indoor arena in Nishio, Japan

- 西尾市総合体育館
- Daisen Arena Nishio
- Interactive map of Nishio City Gymnasium
- Address: Nishio, Aichi; Japan
- Capacity: Main: 1,514 (fixed); 2,174 (full)
- Type: Indoor arena
- Field size: Main: 38 m × 60 m (125 ft × 197 ft); Sub-arena: 21 m × 24 m (69 ft × 79 ft)

Construction
- Opened: 1 October 1993

The Nishio City Gymnasium (西尾市総合体育館, Nishio-shi Sōgō Taiikukan; Nishio City General Gymnasium), also known as the Daisen Arena Nishio (ダイセンアリーナ西尾, Daisen Arīna Nishio) for sponsorship reasons, is an indoor arena in Nishio, Aichi, Japan.

== Background ==
The Nishio City Gymnasium opened on 1 October 1993.

The venue was given the name Daisen Arena Nishio due to sponsorship reasons with Daisen Co., Ltd. The arena adopted the name on 1 November 2025 and the contract is scheduled to last until 31 October 2030.

It served as the venue for the boxing events of the 2026 Asian Games.

== Facilities ==
The Nishio City Gymnasium is built on 39,639.18-square-meter (426,672.6 sq ft) lot and has a total building floor area of 11,006.72 m^{2} (118,475.3 sq ft).

It is divided in multiple components. Its 38-by-60-meter (125 ft × 197 ft) main arena area can accommodate indoor sports like basketball, volleyball, and badminton and fixed seating capacity of 1,508, additional six accessibility seats, as well as 660 retractable seats. It also has a 21-by-24-meter (69 ft × 79 ft) sub-arena. It also has a separate Kyūdō range and a martial arts hall. It also has conference rooms.
