= Liu Chuang (boxer) =

Chinese boxer

Personal information
- Nationality: China
- Born: 25 July 2000 (age 25)

Boxing career
Medal record
Men's amateur boxing
Representing China
World Championships
Bronze medal – third place	2025 Liverpool	55 kg

Liu Chuang (born 25 July 2000) is a Chinese boxer. He competed at the 2025 World Boxing Championships, winning the bronze medal in the men's 55 kg event.
