= Rui Yamaguchi =

Japanese boxer (born 2004)

Personal information
- Nationality: Japanese
- Born: 12 May 2004 (age 22) Osaka, Japan
- Height: 172 cm (5 ft 8 in)
- Weight: 53 kg (117 lb)

Boxing career
- Weight class: Bantamweight
Medal record
Men's amateur boxing
Representing Japan
Asian Championships
| Gold medal – first place | 2026 Ulaanbaatar | Bantamweight |
Asian Games
| Gold medal – first place | 2026 Aichi–Nagoya | Bantamweight |
IBA Youth World Boxing Championships
| Bronze medal – third place | 2022 Spain | Flyweight |

Rui Yamaguchi (山口瑠, Yamaguchi Rui; born 12 May 2004) is a Japanese boxer.

== Biography and career ==
Yamaguchi started his martial art life with karate and later kickboxing, training out of the NJKF Kenshinkaikan. He amassed a high number of amateur kickboxing youth titles before transitioning to boxing permanently at the age of 15. In 2021 he won the All Japan High School Athletic Federation Championship and the JABF All Japan High School Championship in the light flyweight division. In 2022 he once again won the JABF All Japan High School Championship, this time in the flyweight division.

In April 2026, Yamaguchi competed at the 2026 Asian Boxing Elite Boxing Championships and won a gold medal in the bantamweight category. This was the first time in 43 years that a Japanese boxer won gold in the category at the Asian Championships. In October 2026, he competed at the 2026 Asian Games and won a gold medal in the bantamweight category. He became the first bantamweight Japanese boxer to win gold at the Asian Games since Hitoshi Ishigaki at the 1974 Asian Games.
