= Nijat Huseynov =

Azerbaijani boxer (2007)

Personal information
- Native name: Nicat Hüseynov
- Born: 21 March 2007 (age 19)
- Height: 1.82 m (6 ft 0 in)

Sport
- Sport: Boxing
Medal record
Men's amateur boxing
Representing Azerbaijan
Olympic Qualification Tournament
Gold medal – first place	2024 Paris	Light flyweight
Youth World Championships
Bronze medal – third place	2021 Kielce	Light flyweight
European U22 Boxing Championships
Gold medal – first place	2023 Budva	Light flyweight
Gold medal – first place	2022 Poreč	Light flyweight

Nijat Habil oglu Huseynov (Azerbaijani: Nicat Habil oğlu Hüseynov; born 21 March 2007) is an Azerbaijani boxer competing in the light flyweight weight category. He is a member of Azerbaijan's national team, a bronze medalist at the 2021 Youth World Championships, a two-time European Youth Champion (2022, 2023) and has represented at the 2024 Summer Olympics.

== Biography ==
Nijat Huseynov was born on 21 March 2007, in Baku. He graduated from the Coaching Faculty of the Azerbaijan State Academy of Physical Education and Sport.

As a junior, his coach was world champion and Olympic medalist Aghasi Mammadov.

In April 2021, Huseynov won a bronze medal in the 49 kg category at the 2021 AIBA Youth World Boxing Championships held in Kielce, Poland.

In March 2022, he became the European U22 Boxing champion in the 51 kg weight category in Poreč, Croatia. In the final, he defeated Georgian boxer Lekso Khasaya.

In October 2022, representing the UGİM-1 Club, Huseynov placed second at the Azerbaijani Boxing Championship, losing in the final to Masud Yusifzade from the BFL Club.

In May 2023, Huseynov was selected for Azerbaijan's senior team to compete at the World Boxing Championships in Tashkent. He won his first bout against Po Hau Hsu (Taiwan) in the 1/16 finals of the 54 kg category with a score of 5:0., but lost in the 1/8 finals to 2016 Olympic silver medalist Segundo Finol from Venezuela with the same score. He attributed his loss to biased refereeing.

In November 2023, Huseynov defended his European Youth (U22) Championship title in Budva, Montenegro, defeating Armenian boxer Rudolf Garboyan in the final with a score of 5:0.

In March 2024, he participated in the World Boxing Olympic Qualification Tournament in Busto Arsizio, Italy. Competing in the 51 kg category, Huseynov defeated India's Deepak Deepak, a World Championship medalist, in the 1/32 finals, followed by wins over European champion and World runner-up Sakhil Alakhverdovi (Georgia) and Armenian boxer Rudolf Garboyan. In the quarterfinals, Huseynov beat Roscoe Hill (USA), a silver medalist at the previous World Championship. Despite a knockdown in the first round, Huseynov turned the bout in his favor in the next two rounds, winning 3:2. His semifinal qualification secured him a spot at the 2024 Summer Olympics in Paris. Competing in Olympics, Huseynov reached the Round of 16 in the men's 51 kg boxing event before being eliminated.
