= Ramón Quiroga (boxer) =

Argentine boxer (born 1997)

Personal information
- Born: 26 August 1997 (age 28) San Ramón de la Nueva Orán, Argentina

Sport
- Sport: Boxing
Medal record
Boxing
Representing Argentina
Pan American Games
Bronze medal – third place	2023 Santiago	51 kg

Ramón Nicanor Quiroga (born 26 August 1997) is an Argentine boxer. He competed in the men's flyweight event at the 2020 Summer Olympics. Quiroga also won a bronze medal at the 2019 Pan American Games.
