= Roscoe Hill =

American boxer (born 1994)

Personal information
- Full name: Roscoe Aaron Hill
- Born: November 9, 1994 (age 31) Michigan, U.S.
- Home town: Spring, Texas, U.S.
- Height: 5 ft 9 in (175 cm)

Boxing career
Medal record
Men's amateur boxing
Representing United States
IBA World Championships
Silver medal – second place	2021 Belgrade	Flyweight
Pan American Games
Bronze medal – third place	2023 Santiago	51 kg
Pan American Championships
Gold medal – first place	2022 Guayaquil	51 kg

Roscoe Aaron Hill (born November 9, 1994) is an American boxer. He competed at the 2021 AIBA World Boxing Championships, winning the silver medal in the flyweight event.
