= Makhmud Sabyrkhan =

Kazakh boxer

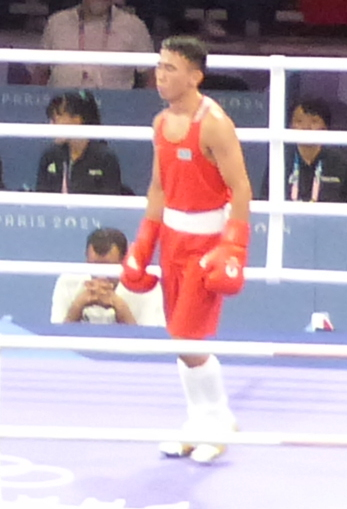
- Sabyrkhan in 2024

Personal information
- Nationality: Kazakh
- Born: 9 September 2001 (age 25) Shymkent, Kazakhstan

Boxing career
Medal record
Men's amateur boxing
Representing Kazakhstan
World Championships
Gold medal – first place	2025 Liverpool	55 kg
IBA World Championships
Gold medal – first place	2023 Tashkent	Bantamweight
Silver medal – second place	2021 Belgrade	Bantamweight
Asian Championships
Gold medal – first place	2024 Chiang Mai	Bantamweight
Silver medal – second place	2022 Amman	Bantamweight

Makhmud Sabyrkhan (born 9 September 2001) is a Kazakh boxer. He competed at the 2021 AIBA World Boxing Championships, winning the silver medal in the bantamweight event. He also competed at the 2023 IBA World Boxing Championships, winning the gold medal in the same event, by defeating Uzbekistani Oybek Juraev 5-0 in the final.

Sabyrkhan competed for Kazakhstan at the 2024 Summer Olympics in the men's 57 kg event.

He competed at the 2025 WB World Boxing Championships, winning the gold medal in the 55 kg event, by defeating Spanish Rafael Lozano 5-0 in the final.

Sabyrkhan was voted the best boxer of 2025 by World Boxing.

He received the bronze medal at the 2026 Asian Championships, losing the silver medal match to a Mongolian Kharkhüügiin Bilgüünsaikhan 0-5.

He is the older brother of Torekhan Sabyrkhan, who is also a Kazakh boxer. Both brothers have competed in various amateur competitions and are regarded as promising athletes on Kazakhstan’s boxing scene.
