= 2023 IBA World Boxing Championships – Light middleweight =

Light middleweight at the 2023 IBA World Boxing Championships
- Venue: Humo Arena
- Location: Tashkent, Uzbekistan
- Dates: 3–14 May
- Competitors: 59 from 59 nations

Medalists
gold medal	Aslanbek Shymbergenov	Kazakhstan
silver medal	Saidjamshid Jafarov	Uzbekistan
bronze medal	Nishant Dev	India
bronze medal	Wanderson de Oliveira	Brazil

The light middleweight competition at the 2023 IBA Men's World Boxing Championships was held between 3 and 14 May 2023.

== Results ==
=== Finals ===
Semifinals
(India) Nishant Dev	2
(Kazakhstan) Aslanbek Shymbergenov	5
(Uzbekistan) Saidjamshid Jafarov	4
(Brazil) Wanderson de Oliveira	1

Final
(Kazakhstan) Aslanbek Shymbergenov	5
(Uzbekistan) Saidjamshid Jafarov	0

=== Top half ===
==== Section 1 ====
Round of 64
(Ecuador) José Rodríguez	4
(Zambia) Stephen Zimba	1
(Australia) Shannan Davey	1
(Cuba) Jorge Cuéllar	3
(South Africa) Simnikiwe Bongco	5
(Cook Islands) Tawhiri Toheriri-Hallett	0
(Palestine) Nidal Foqahaa	4
(Lesotho) Arena Pakela	1
(Cameroon) Albert Mengue	5
(Bosnia and Herzegovina) Gianni Dedić	0
(South Korea) Lee Sang-min	RSC
(Hong Kong) Chan Kam Tong
(India) Nishant Dev	5
(Azerbaijan) Sarkhan Aliyev	0

Round of 32
(Jordan) Zeyad Ishaish	3
(Ecuador) José Rodríguez	4
(Cuba) Jorge Cuéllar	5
(South Africa) Simnikiwe Bongco	0
(Palestine) Nidal Foqahaa	5
(Cameroon) Albert Mengue	0
(South Korea) Lee Sang-min	0
(India) Nishant Dev	5

Round of 16
(Ecuador) José Rodríguez	2
(Cuba) Jorge Cuéllar	5
(Palestine) Nidal Foqahaa
(India) Nishant Dev	RSC

Quarterfinals
(Cuba) Jorge Cuéllar	0
(India) Nishant Dev	5

==== Section 2 ====
Round of 64
(Hungary) Makszims Pilipec	5
(Tajikistan) Dovud Makhkamov	0
(France) Makan Traoré	4
(Mongolia) Otgonbaataryn Byamba-Erdene	1
(Turkey) Tuğrul Han Erdemir	5
(Guinea) Youssouf Diallo	0
(Algeria) Youcef Islam Yaiche	5
(Panama) Eduardo Beckford	0
(Israel) Miroslav Kapuler	4
(Austria) Esad Avdic	1
(Albania) Denis Nurja	1
(Trinidad and Tobago) Aaron Prince	4

Round of 32
(Japan) Sewon Okazawa	5
(Hungary) Makszims Pilipec	0
(France) Makan Traoré	4
(Turkey) Tuğrul Han Erdemir	3
(Algeria) Youcef Islam Yaiche
(Israel) Miroslav Kapuler	w/o
(Trinidad and Tobago) Aaron Prince	0
(Kazakhstan) Aslanbek Shymbergenov	5

Round of 16
(Japan) Sewon Okazawa	0
(France) Makan Traoré	5
(Israel) Miroslav Kapuler	0
(Kazakhstan) Aslanbek Shymbergenov	5

Quarterfinals
(France) Makan Traoré	0
(Kazakhstan) Aslanbek Shymbergenov	5

=== Bottom half ===
==== Section 3 ====
Round of 64
(Uzbekistan) Saidjamshid Jafarov	5
(Mozambique) Tiago Muxanga	0
(Moldova) Davron Bozorov	4
(Chinese Taipei) Kan Chia-wei	3
(China) Li Guofeng	0
(Puerto Rico) Ángel Llanos	5
(Spain) Sergio Martínez	0
(Russia) Igor Sviridchenkov	5
(Thailand) Peerapat Yeasungnoen	5
(Tanzania) Kassim Mbundwike	0
(Turkmenistan) Baýramdurdy Nurmuhammedow	4
(Democratic Republic of the Congo) Steve Kulenguluka	1
(Burundi) Nestor Nduwarugira
(Mauritius) Merven Clair	RSC

Round of 32
(Mexico) Marco Verde	1
(Uzbekistan) Saidjamshid Jafarov	4
(Moldova) Davron Bozorov	3
(Puerto Rico) Ángel Llanos	4
(Russia) Igor Sviridchenkov	5
(Thailand) Peerapat Yeasungnoen	0
(Turkmenistan) Baýramdurdy Nurmuhammedow	4
(Mauritius) Merven Clair	1

Round of 16
(Uzbekistan) Saidjamshid Jafarov	w/o
(Puerto Rico) Ángel Llanos
(Russia) Igor Sviridchenkov	5
(Turkmenistan) Baýramdurdy Nurmuhammedow	0

Quarterfinals
(Uzbekistan) Saidjamshid Jafarov	5
(Russia) Igor Sviridchenkov	0

==== Section 4 ====
Round of 64
(Morocco) Hamza El Barbari	RSC
(United Arab Emirates) Husain Al-Kandari
(Kenya) Boniface Mogunde	5
(The Bahamas) Carl Hield	0
(Greece) Thodoris Ritzakis
(Uganda) Isaac Ssenyange	RSC
(Georgia (country)) Eskerkhan Madiev	RSC
(Saint Lucia) Kyghan Mortley
(Angola) Nafital Goma	0
(Belarus) Aliaksandr Radzionau	5
(Colombia) Jhonatan Arboleda	RSC
(Dominican Republic) Miguel Arias
(Niger) Mohamed Yacouba
(Kyrgyzstan) Nuradin Rustambek Uulu	RSC

Round of 32
(Morocco) Hamza El Barbari	4
(Kenya) Boniface Mogunde	0
(Uganda) Isaac Ssenyange	0
(Georgia (country)) Eskerkhan Madiev	4
(Belarus) Aliaksandr Radzionau	4
(Colombia) Jhonatan Arboleda	3
(Kyrgyzstan) Nuradin Rustambek Uulu	3
(Brazil) Wanderson de Oliveira	4

Round of 16
(Morocco) Hamza El Barbari	1
(Georgia (country)) Eskerkhan Madiev	4
(Belarus) Aliaksandr Radzionau	3
(Brazil) Wanderson de Oliveira	4

Quarterfinals
(Georgia (country)) Eskerkhan Madiev	0
(Brazil) Wanderson de Oliveira	5
