= Boxing at the 2024 Summer Olympics – Men's 71 kg =

Men's 71 kg at the Games of the XXXIII Olympiad
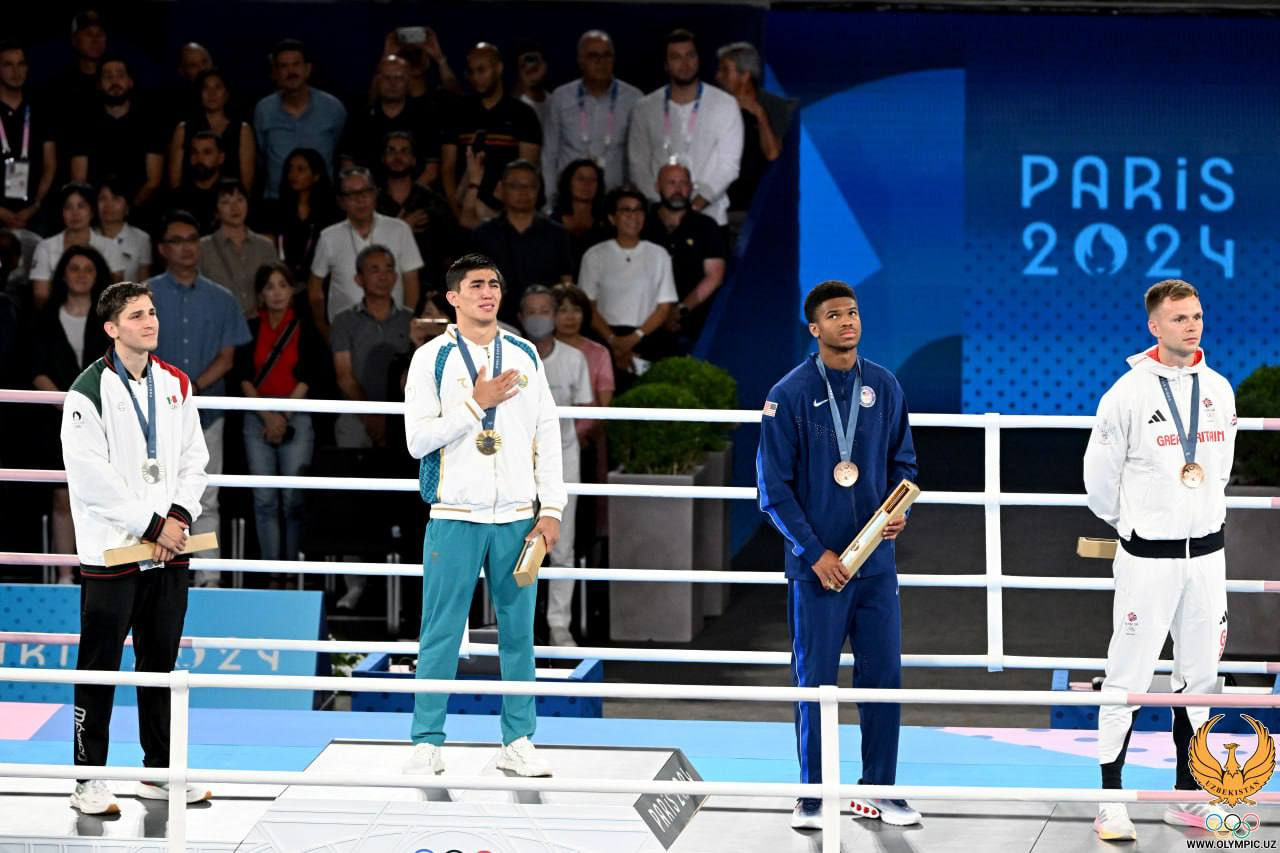
- Medalists Marco Verde, Asadkhuja Muydinkhujaev, Omari Jones, and Lewis Richardson stand on the podium at the award ceremony
- Venue: Arena Paris Nord (preliminary); Stade Roland Garros (semifinals and finals)
- Dates: 28 July – 9 August 2024
- Competitors: 20 from 20 nations

Medalists
1st place, gold medalist(s)		Asadkhuja Muydinkhujaev	Uzbekistan
2nd place, silver medalist(s)		Marco Verde	Mexico
3rd place, bronze medalist(s)		Omari Jones	United States
3rd place, bronze medalist(s)		Lewis Richardson	Great Britain

The men's 71 kg (welterweight) boxing event at the 2024 Summer Olympics took place between 28 July and 9 August 2024. Preliminary boxing matches occurred at Arena Paris Nord in Villepinte, with the medal rounds (semifinals and finals) staged at Stade Roland Garros.

== Background ==
This was the 26th appearance of the men's welterweight event. The event appeared at the first Olympic boxing tournament in 1904, was not held in 1908, and has been held at every Games with boxing (that is, excluding 1912) since, beginning with 1920. The maximum weight for the welterweight class has been 69 kg since 2004 and remains there for 2020; the removal of the light-welterweight class moved the lower bound of welterweight from 64 kg to 63 kg.

Defending champion Roniel Iglesias did not qualify, the 2020 silver medalist Pat McCormack turned professional and did not participate, one of the 2020 bronze medalists, the only returning medalist Aidan Walsh lost to Makan Traoré in round of 16, and the other bronze medalist, Andrey Zamkovoy, was not allowed to participate since IOC barred the Russian Olympic Committee due to war in Ukraine.

== Qualification ==
Each NOC could send one boxer to the event.

== Competition format ==
Like all Olympic boxing events, the competition was a straight single-elimination tournament. The competition began with a preliminary round, where the number of competitors was reduced to 16, and concluded with a final. As there were fewer than 32 boxers in the competition, a number of boxers received a bye through the preliminary round. Both semi-final losers were awarded bronze medals.

Bouts consisted of three three-minute rounds with a one-minute break between rounds. A boxer may win by knockout or by points. Scoring was on the "10-point-must," with five judges scoring each round. Judges consider "number of blows landed on the target areas, domination of the bout, technique and tactical superiority and competitiveness." Each judge determined a winner for each round, who received 10 points for the round, and assigned the round's loser a number of points between seven and nine based on performance. The judge's scores for each round were added to give a total score for that judge. The boxer with the higher score from a majority of the judges was the winner.

== Schedule ==
The schedule was as follows.

Legend

R32	Round of 32	R16	Round of 16	QF	Quarter-Finals	SF	Semi-Finals	F	Final

Jul 28	Jul 29	Jul 30	Jul 31	Aug 1	Aug 2	Aug 3	Aug 4	Aug 5	Aug 6	Aug 7	Aug 8	Aug 9
R32			R16			QF			SF			F

== Draw ==
The draw was held on 25 July 2024.

== Seeds ==
The seeds were released on 25 July 2024.

1. Shannan Davey (AUS) (round of 16)
2. Marco Verde (MEX) (final)
3. Sewon Okazawa (JPN) (round of 16)
4. Nikolai Terteryan (DEN) (quarterfinals)
5. Omar Elawady (EGY) (round of 16)
6. Vahid Abasov (SRB) (round of 16)
7. José Rodríguez Tenorio (ECU) (round of 16)
8. Kan Chia-wei (TPE) (round of 16)

== Results ==
=== Finals ===
Final
9 August
Asadkhuja Muydinkhujaev (UZB)	5
Marco Verde (MEX)	0

=== Top half ===
Round of 32
28 July
Damian Durkacz (POL)	0
Rami Mofid Kiwan (BUL)	5
28 July
Makan Traoré (FRA)	4
Aidan Walsh (IRL)	0

Round of 16
31 July
Shannan Davey (AUS)	0
Rami Mofid Kiwan (BUL)	5
31 July
Omari Jones (USA)	5
Kan Chia-wei (TPE)	0
31 July
Omar Elawady (EGY)	0
Asadkhuja Muydinkhujaev (UZB)	5
31 July
Makan Traoré (FRA)	1
Nikolai Terteryan (DEN)	4

Quarterfinals
3 August
Rami Mofid Kiwan (BUL)	0
Omari Jones (USA)	5
3 August
Asadkhuja Muydinkhujaev (UZB)	5
Nikolai Terteryan (DEN)	0

Semifinals
6 August
Omari Jones (USA)	2
Asadkhuja Muydinkhujaev (UZB)	3

=== Bottom half ===
Round of 32
28 July
Aslanbek Shymbergenov (KAZ)	2
Zeyad Ishaish (JOR)	3
28 July
Magomed Schachidow (GER)	1
Tiago Muxanga (MOZ)	4

Round of 16
31 July
Sewon Okazawa (JPN)	2
Zeyad Ishaish (JOR)	3
31 July
Lewis Richardson (GBR)	3
Vahid Abasov (SRB)	2
31 July
José Rodríguez (ECU)	2
Nishant Dev (IND)	3
31 July
Tiago Muxanga (MOZ)	2
Marco Verde (MEX)	3

Quarterfinals
3 August
Zeyad Ishaish (JOR)	2
Lewis Richardson (GBR)	3
3 August
Nishant Dev (IND)	1
Marco Verde (MEX)	4

Semifinals
6 August
Lewis Richardson (GBR)	2
Marco Verde (MEX)	3
