= 2025 World Boxing Championships – Men's 70 kg =

Competition at amateur boxing tournament

Men's 70 kg at the 2025 World Boxing Championships
- Venue: Liverpool Arena
- Location: Liverpool, England
- Dates: 4–14 September
- Competitors: 41 from 41 nations

Medalists
gold medal	Torekhan Sabyrkhan	Kazakhstan
silver medal	Sewon Okazawa	Japan
bronze medal	Zeyad Ishaish	Jordan
bronze medal	Odel Kamara	England

The Men's 70 kg competition at the 2025 World Boxing Championships was held from 4 to 14 September 2025.

== Results ==
=== Finals ===
Semifinals; 13 September
Zeyad Ishaish (JOR)	1
Sewon Okazawa (JPN)	4
Torekhan Sabyrkhan (KAZ)	4
Odel Kamara (ENG)	1

Final; 14 September
Sewon Okazawa (JPN)	2
Torekhan Sabyrkhan (KAZ)	3

=== Top half ===
==== Section 1 ====
Preliminaries; 4 September
Sarkhan Aliyev (AZE)	1
Carlos Flowers (USA)	4
Kevin Scott (SWE)	4
Jorge Cuéllar (CUB)	1
Frank Martínez Bernad (ESP)	5
Yurii Zakharieiev (UKR)	0

Round of 32; 6 September
Zeyad Ishaish (JOR)	5
Carlos Flowers (USA)	0
Kim Joon-su (KOR)	2
Luka Nikabadze (GEO)	3
Shavkatjon Boltaev (UZB)	3
Kevin Scott (SWE)	2
Frank Martínez Bernad (ESP)	5
Magomed Schachidov (GER)	0

Round of 16; 8 September
Zeyad Ishaish (JOR)	5
Luka Nikabadze (GEO)	0
Shavkatjon Boltaev (UZB)	3
Frank Martínez Bernad (ESP)	0

Quarter-finals; 10 September
Zeyad Ishaish (JOR)	5
Shavkatjon Boltaev (UZB)	0

==== Section 2 ====
Preliminaries; 4 September
Jonathan Oniemba (BEL)	2
Kelvin Soquessa (CZE)	3
Baýramdurdy Nurmuhammedow (TKM)	5
Abel Álvarez (MEX)	0

Round of 32; 6 September
Sewon Okazawa (JPN)	5
Kelvin Soquessa (CZE)	0
Christos Karaitis (GRE)	5
Mateo Paulinic (CRO)	0
Sonny Kerr (SCO)	0
Ihtiar Nishanov (KGZ)	5
Baýramdurdy Nurmuhammedow (TKM)	3
Kaian Reis (BRA)	2

Round of 16; 8 September
Sewon Okazawa (JPN)	5
Christos Karaitis (GRE)	0
Ihtiar Nishanov (KGZ)	3
Baýramdurdy Nurmuhammedow (TKM)	2

Quarter-finals; 10 September
Sewon Okazawa (JPN)	4
Ihtiar Nishanov (KGZ)	1

=== Bottom half ===
==== Section 3 ====
Preliminaries; 4 September
Finn Bos (NED)	5
Makszims Pilipec (HUN)	0
Paweł Sulęcki (POL)	0
Kan Chia-wei (TPE)	5

Round of 32; 6 September
Hitesh Gulia (IND)	1
Finn Bos (NED)	4
Youcef Islam Yaiche (ALG)	1
Torekhan Sabyrkhan (KAZ)	3
Matthew McCole (IRL)	2
Ronald Chavez Jr (PHI)	3
Kan Chia-wei (TPE)	0
Makan Traoré (FRA)	5

Round of 16; 8 September
Finn Bos (NED)	1
Torekhan Sabyrkhan (KAZ)	4
Ronald Chavez Jr (PHI)	0
Makan Traoré (FRA)	5

Quarter-finals; 10 September
Torekhan Sabyrkhan (KAZ)	5
Makan Traoré (FRA)	0

==== Section 4 ====
Preliminaries; 4 September
Aleksandr Trofimčuk (LTU)	5
Wesley Cameron (NZL)	0
Sina Hassanpour (IRI)	1
Shpetim Bajoku (KOS)	4

Round of 32; 6 September
Otgonbaataryn Byamba-Erdene (MGL)	5
Aleksandr Trofimčuk (LTU)	0
Salvatore Cavallaro (ITA)	0
Necat Ekinci (TUR)	5
Josaia Veiqaravi (FIJ)	0
Kuwardeep Manu (CAN)	5
Shpetim Bajoku (KOS)	0
Odel Kamara (ENG)	5

Round of 16; 8 September
O Byamba-Erdene (MGL)	3
Necat Ekinci (TUR)	2
Kuwardeep Manu (CAN)	0
Odel Kamara (ENG)	5

Quarter-finals; 10 September
Otgonbaataryn Byamba-Erdene (MGL)	0
Odel Kamara (ENG)	5
