= Boxing at the 2026 Asian Games – Men's 70 kg =

Boxing competitions

Men's 70 kg at the 2026 Asian Games
- Venue: Nishio City Gymnasium
- Date: 21 September – 2 October 2026
- Competitors: 25 from 25 nations

Medalists
gold medal	Torekhan Sabyrkhan	Kazakhstan
silver medal	Zeyad Ishaish	Jordan
bronze medal	Shavkatjon Boltaev	Uzbekistan
bronze medal	Sewon Okazawa	Japan

The men's 70 kilograms event at the 2026 Asian Games took place from 21 September to 2 October 2026 at the Nishio City Gymnasium, Nishio, Aichi Prefecture, Japan.

The gold medal was won by Kazakhstan's Torekhan Sabyrkhan, who defeated Jordan's Zeyad Ishaish by a 5–0 unanimous decision in the final. Shavkatjon Boltaev of Uzbekistan and Sewon Okazawa of Japan took the bronze medals.

== Schedule ==
All times are Japan Standard Time (UTC+09:00)

Date	Time	Event
Monday, 21 September 2026	12:00	Round of 32
Thursday, 24 September 2026	13:45	Round of 16
Monday, 28 September 2026	14:00	Quarterfinals
Wednesday, 30 September 2026	15:00	Semifinals
Friday, 2 October 2026	14:00	Final

== Results ==
Legend

- KO — Won by knockout
- RSC — Won by referee stop contest
- RSCI — Won by referee stop contest injury

=== Final ===
Final
Torekhan Sabyrkhan (KAZ)	5
Zeyad Ishaish (JOR)	0

=== Top half ===
Round of 32
Nguyễn Đức Ngọc (VIE)	0
Mohammed Dbichi (QAT)	5
Bunjong Sinsiri (THA)	0
Sumit Kundu (IND)	5
Dan Bahadur Darlami (NEP)	0
Ali Qasim (IRQ)	5
Mohammad Ibrahim Frootan (AFG)	1
Kim Joon-su (KOR)	4
Ali Habibinejad (IRI)	2
Li Guofeng (CHN)	3

Round of 16
Torekhan Sabyrkhan (KAZ)	5
Mohammed Dbichi (QAT)	0
Sumit Kundu (IND)
Ali Qasim (IRQ)	RSCI
Shavkatjon Boltaev (UZB)	4
Kim Joon-su (KOR)	1
Li Guofeng (CHN)	RSC
Otgonbaataryn Byamba-Erdene (MGL)

Quarterfinals
Torekhan Sabyrkhan (KAZ)	KO
Ali Qasim (IRQ)
Shavkatjon Boltaev (UZB)	5
Li Guofeng (CHN)	0

Semifinals
Torekhan Sabyrkhan (KAZ)	5
Shavkatjon Boltaev (UZB)	0

=== Bottom half ===
Round of 32
Norlan Petecio (PHI)	5
Vy Sophors (CAM)	0
Lahiru Lakmal (SRI)	4
Mustafa Saeed (YEM)	1
Baýramdurdy Nurmuhammedow (TKM)	1
Aly Amr Abdalla (BRN)	4
Kan Chia-wei (TPE)	1
Mohammed Issa (PLE)	4

Round of 16
Sewon Okazawa (JPN)	5
Norlan Petecio (PHI)	0
Lahiru Lakmal (SRI)
Ikhtiar Nishonov (KGZ)	RSC
Shamsher Saidov (TJK)	5
Aly Amr Abdalla (BRN)	0
Mohammed Issa (PLE)	2
Zeyad Ishaish (JOR)	3

Quarterfinals
Sewon Okazawa (JPN)	5
Ikhtiar Nishonov (KGZ)	0
Shamsher Saidov (TJK)	1
Zeyad Ishaish (JOR)	4

Semifinals
Sewon Okazawa (JPN)	0
Zeyad Ishaish (JOR)	3
