= 2021 AIBA World Boxing Championships – Light middleweight =

Light middleweight at the 2021 AIBA World Boxing Championships
- Venue: Štark Arena
- Location: Belgrade, Serbia
- Dates: 27 October – 6 November
- Competitors: 47 from 47 nations

Medalists
gold medal	Yurii Zakharieiev	Ukraine
silver medal	Vadim Musaev
bronze medal	Alban Beqiri	Albania
bronze medal	Sarkhan Aliyev	Azerbaijan

The Light middleweight competition at the 2021 AIBA World Boxing Championships was held between 27 October and 6 November.

== Results ==
=== Finals ===
Semifinals
(Albania) Alban Beqiri	0
Vadim Musaev	5
(Ukraine) Yurii Zakharieiev	5
(Azerbaijan) Sarkhan Aliyev	0

Final
Vadim Musaev	0
(Ukraine) Yurii Zakharieiev	5

=== Top half ===
==== Section 1 ====
First round
(Jordan) Zeyad Ishaish	5
(Cuba) Roniel Iglesias	0
(Albania) Alban Beqiri	5
(Kenya) Boniface Mogunde	0
(Panama) Eduardo Beckford	RSC
(Sierra Leone) Mohamed Sillah

Second round
(Slovenia) Edin Sejdinović	0
(Jordan) Zeyad Ishaish	5
(Croatia) Filip Kolar	0
(Norway) Don Emini	5
(Lithuania) Saimonas Banys	0
(Albania) Alban Beqiri	5
(Panama) Eduardo Beckford	4
(Chinese Taipei) Chiuan Wang Jia-jyun	1

Third round
(Jordan) Zeyad Ishaish	4
(Norway) Don Emini	0
(Albania) Alban Beqiri	4
(Panama) Eduardo Beckford	1

Quarterfinals
(Jordan) Zeyad Ishaish	1
(Albania) Alban Beqiri	4

==== Section 2 ====
First round
(Hungary) László Kozák	0
(India) Nishant Dev	5
(Ecuador) José Rodríguez	5
(Greece) Iason Sotiropoulos	0
(Poland) Dominik Kida	0
Peerapat Yeasungnoen	5
(Serbia) Džejlan Toskić	w/o
(Tanzania) Kassim Mbundwike

Second round
(Mauritius) Merven Clair	1
(India) Dev Nishant	4
(Ecuador) José Rodríguez
(Mexico) Marco Verde	RSC
(Mongolia) Otgonbaataryn Byamba-Erdene	4
Peerapat Yeasungnoen	1 (Note: The original decision was 4:1 in favour of Otgonbaataryn. Upon appeal by the Thailand Boxing Federation, a bout review jury reviewed and overturned said decision.)
(Serbia) Džejlan Toskić
Vadim Musaev	KO

Third round
(India) Dev Nishant	3
(Mexico) Marco Verde	2
Peerapat Yeasungnoen	0
Vadim Musaev	5

Quarterfinals
(India) Dev Nishant	1
Vadim Musaev	4

=== Bottom half ===
==== Section 3 ====
First round
(Germany) Magomed Schachidov	5
(Cameroon) Albert Mengue	0
(Iran) Farhad Moradi	0
(Kazakhstan) Aslanbek Shymbergenov	5
(Moldova) Nicolae Bucşă	4
(Cyprus) Rafail Pafios	1
(Ukraine) Yurii Zakharieiev	5
(Somalia) Mahmod Said	0

Second round
(Israel) Miroslav Kapuler	2
(Germany) Magomed Schachidov	3
(Kazakhstan) Aslanbek Shymbergenov	5
(Uzbekistan) Shakhram Giyasov	0
(Spain) Youba Sissokho	2 (Note: The original decision was 3:2 in favour of Bucşă. Upon appeal by the Spanish Boxing Federation, a bout review jury reviewed the second round and overturned said decision.)
(Moldova) Nicolae Bucşă	3
(Ukraine) Yurii Zakharieiev	5
(England) Mohammed Akbar	0

Third round
(Germany) Magomed Schachidov
(Kazakhstan) Aslanbek Shymbergenov	RSC
(Spain) Youba Sissokho	0
(Ukraine) Yurii Zakharieiev	5

Quarterfinals
(Kazakhstan) Aslanbek Shymbergenov	2
(Ukraine) Yurii Zakharieiev	3

==== Section 4 ====
First round
(United States) Obed Bartee-El	5
(The Bahamas) Carl Hield	0
(Turkey) Sıtkı Işık	0
(Kyrgyzstan) Nuradin Rustambek Uulu	5
(Colombia) Jhonatan Arboleda	5
(Romania) Dumitru Vicol	0
(Scotland) Stephen Newns	3
(Brazil) Luiz Fernando da Silva	2

Second round
(Italy) Francesco Faraoni	0
(United States) Obed Bartee-El	5
(Kyrgyzstan) Nuradin Rustambek Uulu
(Armenia) Arman Darchinyan	DSQ
(Japan) Yuta Akiyama	3
(Colombia) Jhonatan Arboleda	2
(Scotland) Stephen Newns	0
(Azerbaijan) Sarkhan Aliyev	5

Third round
(United States) Obed Bartee-El	4
(Armenia) Arman Darchinyan	1
(Japan) Yuta Akiyama	0
(Azerbaijan) Sarkhan Aliyev	5

Quarterfinals
(United States) Obed Bartee-El	1
(Azerbaijan) Sarkhan Aliyev	4
