= 2025 IBA World Boxing Championships – Light middleweight =

Light middleweight at the 2025 IBA World Boxing Championships
- Venue: Dubai Duty Free Tennis Stadium
- Location: Dubai, United Arab Emirates
- Dates: 4–13 December
- Competitors: 36

Medalists
gold medal	Ablaikhan Zhussupov	Kazakhstan
silver medal	Sergei Koldenkov	Russia
bronze medal	Baýramdurdy Nurmuhammedow	Turkmenistan
bronze medal	Ikhtiar Nishonov	Kyrgyzstan

The Light middleweight competition at the 2025 IBA Men's World Boxing Championships was held from 4 to 13 December 2025.

== Results ==
=== Finals ===
Semifinals
(Turkmenistan) Baýramdurdy Nurmuhammedow	0
(Russia) Sergei Koldenkov	5
(Kyrgyzstan) Ikhtiar Nishonov	0
(Kazakhstan) Ablaikhan Zhussupov	5

Final
(Russia) Sergei Koldenkov	1
(Kazakhstan) Ablaikhan Zhussupov	4

=== Top half ===
==== Section 1 ====
Round of 64
(Albania) Alban Beqiri	3
(Sweden) Adolphe Sylva	1

Round of 32
(Turkmenistan) Baýramdurdy Nurmuhammedow	RSC-I
(Albania) Alban Beqiri
(Iran) Moslem Maghsoudi	4
(Mali) Fousseyni Traore	3
(Sri Lanka) Gedara Rupassara	4
(Germany) Maksym Bunakov	3
(Zambia) Jonathan Mwiinga
(Spain) Frank Martínez	KO

Round of 16
(Turkmenistan) Baýramdurdy Nurmuhammedow	5
(Iran) Moslem Maghsoudi	0
(Sri Lanka) Gedara Rupassara	1
(Spain) Frank Martínez	4

Quarterfinals
(Turkmenistan) Baýramdurdy Nurmuhammedow	4
(Spain) Frank Martínez	1

==== Section 2 ====
Round of 64
(Mozambique) Tiago Muxanga	WO
(Niger) Mohamed Baro

Round of 32
(Russia) Sergei Koldenkov	ABD
(India) Yashpal Singh
(Colombia) Jhan Ubarnes	5
(Eswatini) Sibonelo Ndzimande	0
(Tajikistan) Dovud Makhkamov	5
(Democratic Republic of the Congo) Otniel Muanda	0
(Mozambique) Tiago Muxanga	4
(Uzbekistan) Shavkatjon Boltaev	3

Round of 16
(Russia) Sergei Koldenkov	5
(Colombia) Jhan Ubarnes	0
(Tajikistan) Dovud Makhkamov
(Mozambique) Tiago Muxanga	DSQ

Quarterfinals
(Russia) Sergei Koldenkov	5
(Mozambique) Tiago Muxanga	0

=== Bottom half ===
==== Section 3 ====
Round of 64
(Libya) Khalida Ahmeedah	WO
(Guinea) Youssouf Diallo

Round of 32
(Moldova) Vasile Cebotari	5
(Libya) Khalida Ahmeedah	0
(Brazil) Edson Araújo de Jesus
(South Africa) Blessing Nziyana	RSA
Arnold Gonzalez	1
(Thailand) Witthaya Chansom	4
(Kyrgyzstan) Ikhtiar Nishonov	KO
(Australia) Alex Skantzos

Round of 16
(Moldova) Vasile Cebotari	RSC
(South Africa) Blessing Nziyana
(Thailand) Witthaya Chansom
(Kyrgyzstan) Ikhtiar Nishonov	KO

Quarterfinals
(Moldova) Vasile Cebotari	3
(Kyrgyzstan) Ikhtiar Nishonov	4

==== Section 4 ====
Round of 64
(Indonesia) Alfino Caesar Nanlohy	0
(Armenia) Ararat Harutyunyan	5

Round of 32
(Azerbaijan) Sarkhan Aliyev	4
(Kenya) Boniface Maina	1
(Palestine) Abdurrahman Abunaser
(Latvia) Arturs Vaišļa	RSC-I
(Belarus) Aliaksandr Radzionau	RSC
(Turkey) Murat Aydemir
(Armenia) Ararat Harutyunyan	0
(Kazakhstan) Ablaikhan Zhussupov	5

Round of 16
(Azerbaijan) Sarkhan Aliyev	5
(Latvia) Arturs Vaišļa	0
(Belarus) Aliaksandr Radzionau	0
(Kazakhstan) Ablaikhan Zhussupov	5

Quarterfinals
(Azerbaijan) Sarkhan Aliyev	0
(Kazakhstan) Ablaikhan Zhussupov	5
