= Boxing at the 2022 Asian Games – Men's 71 kg =

Boxing competitions

Men's 71 kg at the 2022 Asian Games
- Venue: Hangzhou Gymnasium
- Date: 25 September – 4 October 2023
- Competitors: 23 from 23 nations

Medalists
gold medal	Sewon Okazawa	Japan
silver medal	Kan Chia-wei	Chinese Taipei
bronze medal	Baýramdurdy Nurmuhammedow	Turkmenistan
bronze medal	Aslanbek Shymbergenov	Kazakhstan

The men's 71 kilograms event at the 2022 Asian Games took place from 25 September to 4 October 2023 at Hangzhou Gymnasium, Hangzhou, China.

== Schedule ==
All times are China Standard Time (UTC+08:00)

Date	Time	Event
Monday, 25 September 2023	14:00	Preliminaries – R32
Thursday, 28 September 2023	14:00	Preliminaries – R16
Saturday, 30 September 2023	14:00	Quarterfinals
Tuesday, 3 October 2023	14:00	Semifinals
Wednesday, 4 October 2023	19:00	Final

== Results ==
Legend

- ABD — Won by abandonment
- KO — Won by knockout
- RSC — Won by referee stop contest
- RSCI — Won by referee stop contest injury
- WO — Won by walkover

=== Final ===
Final
Kan Chia-wei (TPE)
Sewon Okazawa (JPN)	WO

=== Top half ===
Preliminaries – R32
Nuradin Rustambek Uulu (KGZ)	1
Kan Chia-wei (TPE)	4
Dovud Makhkamov (TJK)	0
Baýramdurdy Nurmuhammedow (TKM)	5
Byambatsogtyn Tögöldör (MGL)	RSCI
Mohammad Khaibar Nooristani (AFG)

Preliminaries – R16
Niraj Wijewardana (SRI)	0
Kan Chia-wei (TPE)	5
Ali Thaher (KUW)
Aswan Che Azmi (MAS)	RSC
Nidal Foqahaa (PLE)
Baýramdurdy Nurmuhammedow (TKM)	RSC
Byambatsogtyn Tögöldör (MGL)	5
Peerapat Yeasungnoen (THA)	0

Quarterfinals
Kan Chia-wei (TPE)	5
Aswan Che Azmi (MAS)	0
Baýramdurdy Nurmuhammedow (TKM)	ABD
Byambatsogtyn Tögöldör (MGL)

Semifinals
Kan Chia-wei (TPE)	4
Baýramdurdy Nurmuhammedow (TKM)	1

=== Bottom half ===
Preliminaries – R32
Zeyad Ishaish (JOR)	RSC
Husain Al-Kandari (UAE)
Dipesh Lama (NEP)	0
Nishant Dev (IND)	5
Lee Sang-min (KOR)	0
Wang Peicheng (CHN)	5
Ryang Jang-thae (PRK)	0
Asadkhuja Muydinkhujaev (UZB)	5

Preliminaries – R16
Sewon Okazawa (JPN)	4
Zeyad Ishaish (JOR)	1
Nishant Dev (IND)	KO
Bùi Phước Tùng (VIE)
Aslanbek Shymbergenov (KAZ)	4
Wang Peicheng (CHN)	0
Asadkhuja Muydinkhujaev (UZB)	5
Marjon Piañar (PHI)	0

Quarterfinals
Sewon Okazawa (JPN)	5
Nishant Dev (IND)	0
Aslanbek Shymbergenov (KAZ)	RSC
Asadkhuja Muydinkhujaev (UZB)

Semifinals
Sewon Okazawa (JPN)	3
Aslanbek Shymbergenov (KAZ)	2

- Mohammad Khaibar Nooristani of Afghanistan originally got the 17th place, but was disqualified after he tested positive for 19-Norandrosterone and Clostebol.
