= Lewis Richardson (boxer) =

English boxer (born 1997)

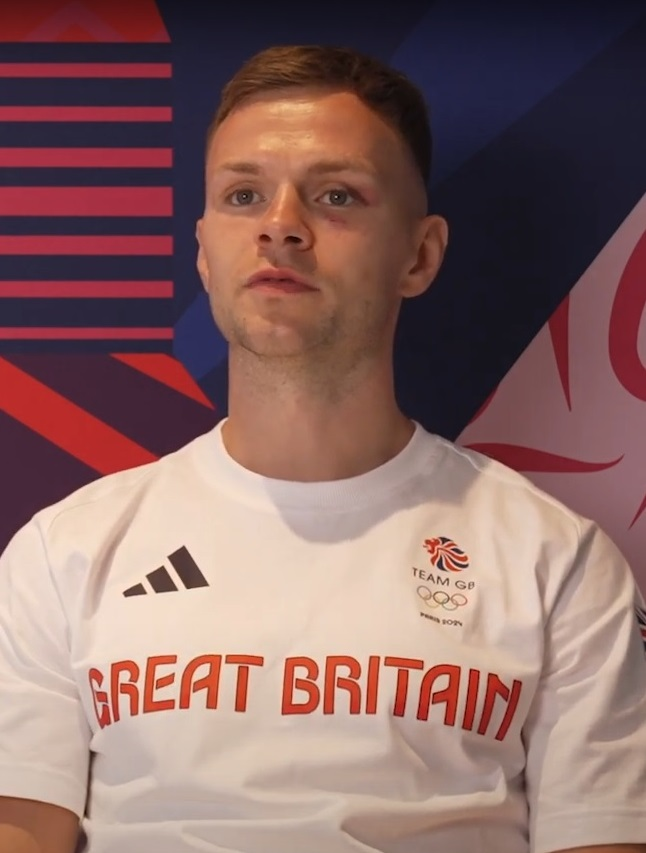
- Richardson in 2024

Personal information
- Full name: Lewis Jake Richardson
- Born: 4 June 1997 (age 29) Colchester, England
- Height: 187 cm (6 ft 2 in)

Boxing career
- Weight class: Middleweight, light heavyweight
- Stance: Southpaw

Boxing record
- Total fights: 3
- Wins: 3
Medal record
Men's amateur boxing
Representing Great Britain
Olympic Games
Bronze medal – third place	2024 Paris	Welterweight
Representing England
European Championships
Silver medal – second place	2022 Yerevan	Middleweight
Commonwealth Games
Bronze medal – third place	2022 Birmingham	Middleweight

Lewis Jake Richardson (born 4 June 1997) is an English professional boxer. As an amateur he won a bronze medal in the 71 kg category at the 2024 Summer Olympics and a silver medal at the 2022 European Championships. Richardson also competed at the 2019 World Championships.

== Amateur career ==
Richardson began boxing at a young age as a means to keep fit while playing football. After winning the 2012 National School Boy Championships he decided to focus on boxing.

In 2018, he was selected to box for Team GB. A few months after the selection he suffered three stress fractures in his back, leaving him out of action for most of the year. After recovering from the injury he won gold medals at the 2018 GB Championships and 2019 Olympic Test Event, securing him a reserve spot for the European Olympic Qualification Event. After teammate Sammy Lee was forced to withdraw due to injury, Richardson took his place. He won his first fight in March 2020, against Victor Yoka of France before the tournament was suspended due to the COVID-19 pandemic. When it resumed in 2021 Richardson lost to eventual Olympic silver medalist Oleksandr Khyzhniak.

He competed at the 2021 World Championships in Belgrade, losing in his first fight against Almir Memic of Serbia.

While representing England at the 2022 European Championships, Richardson defeated GB teammate Sam Hickey of Scotland in the semi-finals, before losing to Gabriel Dossen of Ireland in the finals, securing himself a silver medal.

He won a bronze medal at the 2022 Commonwealth Games in Birmingham, England.

Richardson qualified for the Paris 2024 Summer Olympics by successfully navigating his way through the light-middleweight draw at the 2024 World Olympic Qualification Tournament 2 in Thailand. On 7 June 2024, Richardson was officially announced among the Great Britain squad for the Olympics. He was given a bye into the second round where he defeated Vahid Abasov from Serbia by a 3:2 split decision. He overcame Zeyad Ishaish of Jordan in the quarter-finals on another 3:2 split decision. Richardson fought 2023 Pan American Games gold medalist Marco Verde from Mexico in the semi-finals and lost on a 3:2 split decision meaning he left the competition with a bronze medal.

== Professional career ==
Richardson turned professional in May 2025, signing with Frank Warren's Queensbury Promotions. He made his pro-debut at Portman Road in Ipswich on 7 June 2025, defeating Dmitri Protkunas on points in a six-round bout.

In his second fight in the paid ranks, Richardson defeated Artjom Spatar on points over six rounds at Planet Ice in Altrincham on 23 August 2025. Due to an injury he sustained while sparring on Christmas Eve 2025 and which required surgery, Richardson did not have his third professional fight until 26 September 2026, when he secured a points win against Ivan Trofimovich in a six-round bout at bp pulse LIVE in Birmingham.

== Professional boxing record ==
3 fights	3 wins	0 losses
By decision	3	0

No.	Result	Record	Opponent	Type	Round, time	Date	Location	Notes
3	Win	3–0	Ivan Trofimovich	PTS	6	26 Sep 2026	bp pulse LIVE, Birmingham, England	
2	Win	2–0	Artjom Spatar	PTS	6	23 Aug 2025	Planet Ice, Altrincham, England	
1	Win	1–0	Dmitri Protkunas	PTS	6	7 Jun 2025	Portman Road, Ipswich, England	

== Personal life ==
Richardson enrolled at Sheffield Hallam University in 2020 to study part-time for a master's degree in Sport Business Management.
