= Boxing at the 2023 European Games – Men's light middleweight =

Men's light middleweight boxing at the 2023 European Games
- Venue: Nowy Targ Arena
- Location: Nowy Targ, Poland
- Dates: 23 June – 2 July
- Competitors: 36 from 36 nations

Medalists
gold medal	Nikolai Terteryan	Denmark
silver medal	Vahid Abasov	Serbia
bronze medal	Tuğrulhan Erdemir	Turkey
bronze medal	Makan Traoré	France

The men's light middleweight boxing event at the 2023 European Games was held between 23 June and 2 July 2023.

== Results ==
=== Finals ===
Semi-finals
Makan Traoré (FRA)	0
Vahid Abasov (SRB)	5
Nikolai Terteryan (DEN)	w/o
Tuğrulhan Erdemir (TUR)

Final
Vahid Abasov (SRB)	1
Nikolai Terteryan (DEN)	4

=== Top half ===
==== Section 1 ====
Round of 64
Eskerkhan Madiev (GEO)	4
Youba Sissokho (ESP)	0

Round of 32
Mārtiņš Blumentals (LAT)
Eskerkhan Madiev (GEO)	RSC
Sarkhan Aliyev (AZE)	5
Michal Takács (SVK)	0
Petar Knežević (CRO)	5
Cosmin Hermeziu (ROU)	0
Patriot Behrami (KOS)	0
Makan Traoré (FRA)	5

Round of 16
Eskerkhan Madiev (GEO)	2
Sarkhan Aliyev (AZE)	3
Petar Knežević (CRO)	0
Makan Traoré (FRA)	5

Quarterfinals
Sarkhan Aliyev (AZE)	2
Makan Traoré (FRA)	3

==== Section 2 ====
Round of 64
Miloš Bartl (CZE)	0
Miroslav Kapuler-Ishchenko (ISR)	5

Round of 32
Pavel Kamanin (EST)	5
Gianni Dedić (BIH)	0
Stefan Savković (MNE)	0
Gurgen Madoyan (ARM)	5
Tony Jas (NED)	0
Rami Kiwan (BUL)	5
Miroslav Kapuler-Ishchenko (ISR)	0
Vahid Abasov (SRB)	5

Round of 16
Pavel Kamanin (EST)	0
Gurgen Madoyan (ARM)	5
Rami Kiwan (BUL)	2
Vahid Abasov (SRB)	3

Quarterfinals
Gurgen Madoyan (ARM)	1
Vahid Abasov (SRB)	4

=== Bottom half ===
==== Section 3 ====
Round of 64
Soma Mester (HUN)	0
Aleksandr Trofimčiuk (LTU)	5

Round of 32
Esad Avdic (AUT)	1
Aleksandr Trofimčiuk (LTU)	4
Alban Beqiri (ALB)	4
Dejan Leburić (SLO)	1
Nikolai Terteryan (DEN)	5
Diogo Semedo (POR)	0
Salvatore Cavallaro (ITA)	3
Dean Walsh (IRL)	2

Round of 16
Aleksandr Trofimčiuk (LTU)	1
Alban Beqiri (ALB)	4
Nikolai Terteryan (DEN)	5
Salvatore Cavallaro (ITA)	0

Quarterfinals
Alban Beqiri (ALB)	0
Nikolai Terteryan (DEN)	5

==== Section 4 ====
Round of 64
Martin Skogheim (NOR)	5
Rafail Pafios (CYP)	0

Round of 32
Tuğrulhan Erdemir (TUR)	5
Davron Bozorov (MDA)	0
Damian Durkacz (POL)	2
Yurii Zakharieiev (UKR)	3
Harris Akbar (GBR)	1
Magomed Schachidov (GER)	4
Martin Skogheim (NOR)	0
Konstantinos Petropoulos (GRE)	5

Round of 16
Tuğrulhan Erdemir (TUR)	3
Yurii Zakharieiev (UKR)	2
Magomed Schachidov (GER)	5
Konstantinos Petropoulos (GRE)	0

Quarterfinals
Tuğrulhan Erdemir (TUR)	5
Magomed Schachidov (GER)	0
