= Nikolai Terteryan =

Danish boxer (born 2001)

Personal information
- Nationality: Danish
- Born: 19 June 2001 (age 25) Kolding, Denmark
- Height: 1.82 m (6 ft 0 in)
- Weight: Light middleweight Welterweight

Boxing career
- Stance: Orthodox

Boxing record
- Total fights: 1
- Wins: 1
- Win by KO: 1
Medal record
Men's amateur boxing
Representing Denmark
European Games
Gold medal – first place	2023 Kraków-Małopolska	Light middleweight

Nikolai Terteryan (born 19 June 2001) is a Danish professional boxer. As an amateur, he won the gold medal in the light middleweight event in the 2023 European Games in Kraków, which qualified him for the 2024 Olympic Games in Paris.

== Amateur career ==
Terteryan, who trained at BK Wedala in Vejle, won silver at the 2015 European Schoolboys Championships in Anapa and was also a participant in the 2016 Junior European Championships in Kaposvár, the 2018 Youth World Championships in Budapest and the 2018 Youth European Championships in Roseto and 2019 in Sofia.

At the 2020 European Boxing Olympic Qualification Tournament in London, which was interrupted due to the COVID-19 pandemic and continued in Paris in 2021, Terteryan won the opening round against the Kosovar Shpëtim Bajoku, but lost in the round of 16 to the Belarusian Dzmitry Asanau. In 2021, he became Danish amateur welterweight champion for the first time.

In 2022, Terteryan won the gold medal in the welterweight division at the U22 European Championships in Poreč, defeating Oliwier Zamojski from Poland, Chris-Marco Eloundou from Germany, Yaroslav Mykhalushko from Ukraine, Nabi Iskandarov from Azerbaijan and Ioan Croft from Wales. It was the first European title win by an adult Danish boxer since the 1996 European Championships, when Hasan Al won gold in the welterweight category.

In 2023, Terteryan also won the European Games in Kraków in the light middleweight category, defeating the Portuguese Diogo Marcelino, the Italian Salvatore Cavallaro, the Albanian Alban Beqiri, the Turk Tuğrulhan Erdemir and in the final against the Serbian Vahid Abasov. He thus became the first Danish boxer since Dennis Ceylan in 2012 to qualify for the Olympic Games.

At the 2024 Olympics in Paris Terteryan reached the quarterfinals after a win against Makan Traoré in the round of 16. In the quarterfinal Terteryan was defeated by Uzbek Asadkhuja Muydinkhujaev, who later won the Olympic title.

== Professional career ==
In June 2025, Terteryan was signed by Golden Boy Promotions in a promotional deal alongside his twin brother Sebastian. He made his pro-debut at the Save Mart Center on 12 July 2025, defeating Issa Ajilat by knockout in the opening round.

== Personal life ==
Terteryan's father Tigran was a boxer in the Armenian national team. After Tigran participated in the super heavyweight division at the 1996 European Championships in Vejle, Denmark, he stayed in the country and applied for asylum in order to avoid conscription in Armenia. After bringing his wife and son to Denmark, the couple had three more sons, including Nikolai and his twin brother Sebastian, who also boxes on the Danish national team. Tigran died in 2020 at the age of 50 and was buried in Armenia.

== Professional boxing record ==
1 fight	1 win	0 losses
By knockout	1	0

No.	Result	Record	Opponent	Type	Round, time	Date	Location	Notes
1	Win	1–0	Issa Ajilat	KO	1 (4), 0:48	12 July 2025	Save Mart Center, Fresno, California	
