= 2023 IBA World Boxing Championships – Welterweight =

Welterweight at the 2023 IBA World Boxing Championships
- Venue: Humo Arena
- Location: Tashkent, Uzbekistan
- Dates: 3–14 May
- Competitors: 39 from 39 nations

Medalists
gold medal	Asadkhuja Muydinkhujaev	Uzbekistan
silver medal	Dulat Bekbauov	Kazakhstan
bronze medal	Lasha Guruli	Georgia
bronze medal	Battömöriin Misheelt	Mongolia

The Welterweight competition at the 2023 IBA Men's World Boxing Championships was held between 3 and 14 May 2023.

== Results ==
=== Finals ===
Semifinals
(Georgia (country)) Lasha Guruli	0
(Kazakhstan) Dulat Bekbauov	5
(Uzbekistan) Asadkhuja Muydinkhujaev	5
(Mongolia) Battömöriin Misheelt	0

Final
(Kazakhstan) Dulat Bekbauov	0
(Uzbekistan) Asadkhuja Muydinkhujaev	5

=== Top half ===
==== Section 1 ====
Round of 64
(South Korea) Tae Min-jae
(Moldova) Alexandru Paraschiv	RSC

Round of 32
(Georgia (country)) Lasha Guruli	5
(Moldova) Alexandru Paraschiv	0
(Ghana) Alfred Kotey	5
(Sierra Leone) Mohamed Sillah	0
(Russia) Tarkhan Idigov	RSC
(Ethiopia) Abebe Yelisho
(Iran) Ali Habibinejad	1
(Azerbaijan) Nabi Iskandarov	4

Round of 16
(Georgia (country)) Lasha Guruli	5
(Ghana) Alfred Kotey	0
(Russia) Tarkhan Idigov	4
(Azerbaijan) Nabi Iskandarov	1

Quarterfinals
(Georgia (country)) Lasha Guruli	5
(Russia) Tarkhan Idigov	0

==== Section 2 ====
Round of 64
(Eswatini) Sibonelo Ndzimande	0
(Romania) Andrei Musteţ	5
(Slovenia) Nejc Petrič	RSC
(Zimbabwe) Lwazi Mpofu

Round of 32
(Kazakhstan) Dulat Bekbauov	5
(Romania) Andrei Musteţ	0
(India) Akash Sangwan	5
(China) Fu Mingke	0
(Spain) Johan Orozco	5
(Senegal) Cheikh Tidiane Diop	0
(Slovenia) Nejc Petrič	0
(Mexico) Miguel Martínez	5

Round of 16
(Kazakhstan) Dulat Bekbauov	5
(India) Akash Sangwan	0
(Spain) Johan Orozco	0
(Mexico) Miguel Martínez	5

Quarterfinals
(Kazakhstan) Dulat Bekbauov	5
(Mexico) Miguel Martínez	0

=== Bottom half ===
==== Section 3 ====
Round of 64
(Comoros) Samir Barouf
(Dominican Republic) Jhonny Fernández	RSC
(Japan) Yuto Wakita	RSC
(Poland) Oliwier Szot

Round of 32
(Cuba) Roniel Iglesias	5
(Dominican Republic) Jhonny Fernández	2
(Turkey) Fatih Kaya	0
(Ecuador) Jhancarlo Anchico	5
(Jordan) Abdallah Al-Aarag	0
(Belarus) Kiryl Samadurau	5
(Japan) Yuto Wakita	0
(Uzbekistan) Asadkhuja Muydinkhujaev	5

Round of 16
(Cuba) Roniel Iglesias	RSC
(Ecuador) Jhancarlo Anchico
(Belarus) Kiryl Samadurau	0
(Uzbekistan) Asadkhuja Muydinkhujaev	5

Quarterfinals
(Cuba) Roniel Iglesias	3
(Uzbekistan) Asadkhuja Muydinkhujaev	4

==== Section 4 ====
Round of 64
(The Gambia) Sheikh Sarr
(Algeria) Chemseddine Kramou	ABD
(Venezuela) Christiann Palacio	5
(Kyrgyzstan) Zhakshylyk Talaibekov	0

Round of 32
(Mongolia) Battömöriin Misheelt	5
(Algeria) Chemseddine Kramou	2
(Armenia) Gurgen Madoyan	5
(Chinese Taipei) Lin Yu	0
(Sweden) Adel Belalia	0
(Turkmenistan) Saparmyrat Ödäýew	4
(Venezuela) Christiann Palacio	4
(Serbia) Vahid Abasov	3

Round of 16
(Mongolia) Battömöriin Misheelt	4
(Armenia) Gurgen Madoyan	3
(Turkmenistan) Saparmyrat Ödäýew	0
(Venezuela) Christiann Palacio	5

Quarterfinals
(Mongolia) Battömöriin Misheelt	4
(Venezuela) Christiann Palacio	3
