= Torekhan Sabyrkhan =

Kazakhstani boxer (born 2006)

Torekhan Sabyrkhan Төрехан Сабырхан
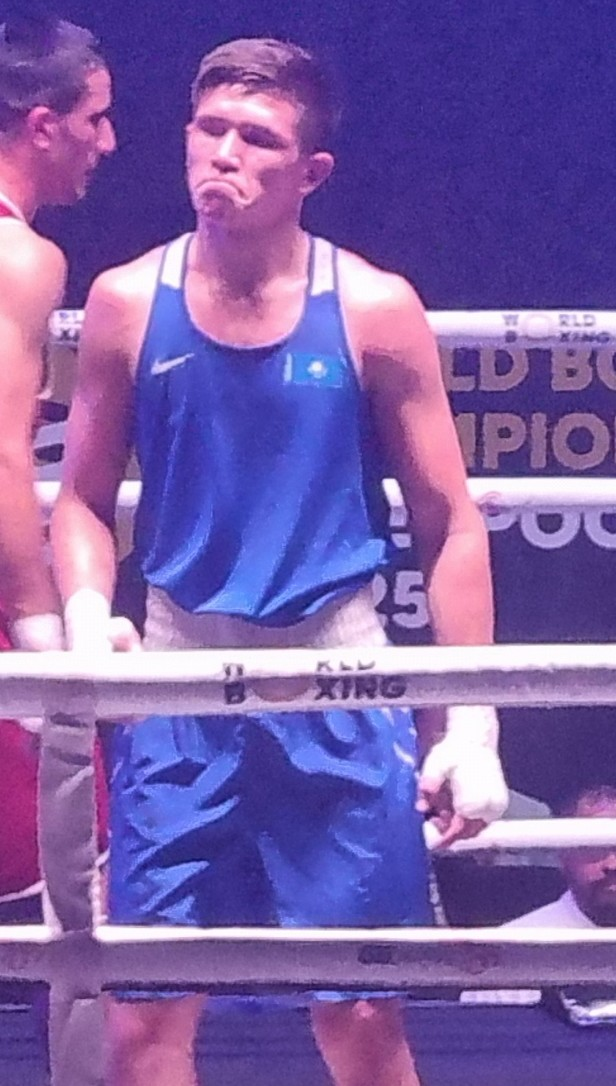
- Sabyrkhan at the 2025 World Boxing Championships

Personal information
- Nationality: Kazakhstani
- Born: 13 February 2006 (age 20) Shymkent, Kazakhstan
- Height: 1.82 m (6 ft 0 in)
- Weight: Light middleweight; Welterweight

Boxing career
- Stance: Orthodox

Boxing record
- Total fights: 1
- Wins: 1
- Win by KO: 1
Medal record
Men's amateur boxing
Representing Kazakhstan
World Championships
| Gold medal – first place | 2025 Liverpool | 70 kg |
Asian Games
| Gold medal – first place | 2026 Aichi–Nagoya | 70 kg |
Asian Championships
| Silver medal – second place | 2026 Ulaanbaatar | 70 kg |
Youth World Championships
| Gold medal – first place | 2024 Budva | Welterweight |

Torekhan Aidarkhanuly Sabyrkhan (Kazakh: Төрехан Айдарханұлы Сабырхан, Törehan Aydarhanulı Sabırhan; born 13 February 2006) is a Kazakhstani professional boxer. As an amateur, he is a gold medalist at the Youth World Championships, World Boxing Championships and the Asian Games as well as a silver medalist at the Asian Championships.

== Amateur career ==
In 2021, Sabyrkhan won his first Asian Boxing Youth Championships, where he competed in the junior light bantamweight category. He would win his second Asian youth title the following year, this time in the featherweight category. In 2023, he moved up to the light welterweight category and won his third Asian youth title. In May 2024, he won his fourth and final youth title, this time in the 67 kg category.

In November 2024, at the Youth World Championships in Budva, Montenegro, Sabyrkhan competed in the welterweight category where he defeated David Espinosa in the final, winning the gold medal.

Sabyrkhan competed in the 70 kg category at the 2025 World Boxing Championships in Liverpool, England. In his opening bout, he defeated Youcef Islam Yaiche. Sabyrkhan then faced Finn Bos and won in their round of 16 contest and later went on to defeat Makan Traoré in the quarterfinals. Sabyrkhan defeated Odel Kamara via 4:1 split decision, advancing to the gold medal match. In the final, he defeated Sewon Okazawa to win the gold medal.

Sabyrkhan competed in the 70 kg category at the 2026 Asian Championships held in Ulaanbaatar, Mongolia, where he won the silver medal following his loss to Zeyad Ishaish. He competed in the 70 kg category at the 2026 Asian Games held in Nishio, Aichi, Japan, where he won the gold medal by defeating Ishaish.

== Professional career ==
In his professional debut, Sabyrkhan faced Jiri Hauke at Barys Arena in Astana, Kazakhstan on 5 April 2025. He won the bout by knockout in the third round.

== Personal life ==
Sabyrkhan is the younger brother of Makhmud Sabyrkhan, who is also a Kazakh boxer. Both brothers have competed in various amateur competitions and are regarded as promising athletes on Kazakhstan's boxing scene.

== Professional boxing record ==
| 1 fight | 1 win | 0 losses |
|---|---|---|
| By knockout | 1 | 0 |

| No. | Result | Record | Opponent | Type | Round, time | Date | Location | Notes |
|---|---|---|---|---|---|---|---|---|
| 1 | Win | 1–0 | Jiri Hauke | KO | 3 (6), 2:33 | 5 July 2025 | Barys Arena, Astana, Kazakhstan | |
