= 2025 World Boxing Championships – Men's 65 kg =

Competition at amateur boxing tournament

Men's 65 kg at the 2025 World Boxing Championships
- Venue: Liverpool Arena
- Location: Liverpool, England
- Dates: 4–14 September
- Competitors: 40 from 40 nations

Medalists
gold medal	Asadkhuja Muydinkhujaev	Uzbekistan
silver medal	Yuri Falcão	Brazil
bronze medal	Erislandy Álvarez	Cuba
bronze medal	Lasha Guruli	Georgia

The Men's 65 kg competition at the 2025 World Boxing Championships was held from 4 to 14 September 2025.

== Results ==
=== Finals ===
Semifinals; 13 September
Erislandy Álvarez (CUB)	1
Yuri Falcão (BRA)	4
Lasha Guruli (GEO)
Asadkhuja Muydinkhujaev (UZB)	w/o

Final; 14 September
Yuri Falcão (BRA)	1
Asadkhuja Muydinkhujaev (UZB)	4

=== Top half ===
==== Section 1 ====
Preliminaries; 4 September
Oier Ibarreche (ESP)	5
Loris Idrizi (KOS)	0
Stelios Kirsanidis (GRE)	0
Ali Habibinejad (IRI)	5

Round of 32; 7 September
Erislandy Álvarez (CUB)	5
Oier Ibarreche (ESP)	0
Viktorio Iliev (BUL)	0
Almaz Orozbekov (KGZ)	5
Leo Church (SCO)	1
Gianluigi Malanga (ITA)	4
Ali Habibinejad (IRI)	5
Battömöriin Misheelt (MGL)	0

Round of 16; 9 September
Erislandy Álvarez (CUB)	3
Almaz Orozbekov (KGZ)	1
Gianluigi Malanga (ITA)	0
Ali Habibinejad (IRI)	5

Quarter-finals; 10 September
Erislandy Álvarez (CUB)	5
Ali Habibinejad (IRI)	0

==== Section 2 ====
Preliminaries; 4 September
Obada Al-Kasbeh (JOR)	5
Hampus Broman (SWE)	0
Zaur Gahramanov (AZE)	4
Denis Bril (GER)	1

Round of 32; 7 September
Shion Nishiyama (JPN)	3
Obada Al-Kasbeh (JOR)	2
Mark Fajardo (PHI)	0
Elvin Aliiev (UKR)	5
Ahmet Pekel (TUR)	0
Lin Yu (TPE)	5
Zaur Gahramanov (AZE)	0
Yuri Falcão (BRA)	5

Round of 16; 9 September
Shion Nishiyama (JPN)	5
Elvin Aliiev (UKR)	0
Lin Yu (TPE)	0
Yuri Falcão (BRA)	5

Quarter-finals; 10 September
Shion Nishiyama (JPN)	0
Yuri Falcão (BRA)	5

=== Bottom half ===
==== Section 3 ====
Preliminaries; 4 September
Mousa Al-Hawsaw (KSA)	5
Semi Koroitukana (FIJ)	0
Maxim Redl (CZE)	0
Hugo Barron (MEX)	5

Round of 32; 7 September
Lasha Guruli (GEO)	5
Mousa Al-Hawsaw (KSA)	0
Yhlasbek Koçkarow (TKM)	0
Dean Clancy (IRL)	5
Rasul Tisayev (BEL)	0
Fernando Piter (DOM)	5
Hugo Barron (MEX)	0
Abhinash Jamwal (IND)	5

Round of 16; 9 September
Lasha Guruli (GEO)	5
Dean Clancy (IRL)	0
Fernando Piter (DOM)	0
Abhinash Jamwal (IND)	5

Quarter-finals; 10 September
Lasha Guruli (GEO)	4
Abhinash Jamwal (IND)	1

==== Section 4 ====
Preliminaries; 4 September
Filip Poturović (CRO)	2
Rene Camacho (USA)	3
Milan Petriman (HUN)	0
Zhu Jianhao (CHN)	5

Round of 32; 7 September
Patris Mughalzai (ENG)	5
Rene Camacho (USA)	0
Yertugan Zeinulinov (KAZ)	5
Hugo Grau (FRA)	0
Bartłomiej Rośkowicz (POL)	0
Ismail Umar (FIN)	5
Zhu Jianhao (CHN)	0
Asadkhuja Muydinkhujaev (UZB)	5

Round of 16; 9 September
Patris Mughalzai (ENG)	0
Yertugan Zeinulinov (KAZ)	4
Ismail Umar (FIN)	0
Asadkhuja Muydinkhujaev (UZB)	5

Quarter-finals; 10 September
Yertugan Zeinulinov (KAZ)	0
Asadkhuja Muydinkhujaev (UZB)	5
