= Bobo-Usmon Baturov =

Uzbekistani boxer

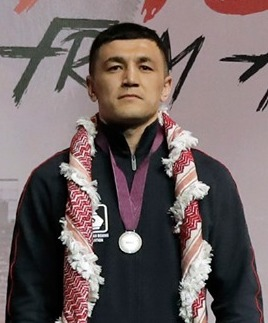
- Baturov in 2020

Personal information
- Nationality: Uzbekistani
- Born: 16 November 1994 (age 31) Jizzakh, Uzbekistan

Boxing career

Boxing record
- Total fights: 36
- Wins: 26
- Win by KO: 0
- Losses: 10
- Draws: 0
- No contests: 0
Medal record
Men's amateur boxing
Representing Uzbekistan
World Championships
Bronze medal – third place	2019 Yekaterinburg	Welterweight
Asian Games
Gold medal – first place	2018 Jakarta-Palembang	Welterweight
Asian Championships
Gold medal – first place	2019 Bangkok	Welterweight
Gold medal – first place	2021 Dubai	Welterweight

Bobo-Usmon Baturov (ru:Бобо-Усмон Шамсутдинович Батуров, uzb: Bobo Usmon Baturov born 16 November 1994 in Jizzakh) is an Uzbekistnai amateur boxer who performs in the welterweight and first middleweight categories. Bronze medalist of the World Championship (2019), champion of the Asian Games (2018), two-time Asian champion (2019, 2021).

== Amateur career ==
Bobo-Usmon Boturov competes in the second welterweight category. He has been competing in amateur boxing since 2013.

Gold medalist of Islamic Solidarity Games 2017 welterweight (69 kg)

In 2018, he took part in the Asian Summer Games, which were held in Jakarta. In the second welterweight division, he managed to win a gold medal, in the final he defeated an athlete from Kazakhstan Aslanbek Shymbergenov.

In Bangkok, at the 2019 Asian Championship, he became the champion of the continent, in the final he beat the Japanese boxer Sevon Okazawa.

At the 2019 AIBA World Championships in Yekaterinburg, Bobo-Usman reached the semifinals, in which he lost to English boxer Pat McCormack, thereby winning the bronze medal.

He competed in the 2020 Summer Olympics in Tokyo, where he reached the welterweight quarterfinals.
