= Ayşen (name) =

Ayşen is a feminineTurkish given name. It may refer to:

- Ayşen Gruda (1944–2019), Turkish actress and comedian
- Ayşen Gürcan (born 1963), Turkish academic and public servant
- Ayşen Taşkın (born 1996), Turkish boxer
