= Boxing at the 2018 Asian Games – Men's 69 kg =

Boxing competitions

Men's 69 kg at the 2018 Asian Games
- Venue: Jakarta International Expo
- Date: 24 August – 1 September 2018
- Competitors: 21 from 21 nations

Medalists
gold medal	Bobo-Usmon Baturov	Uzbekistan
silver medal	Aslanbek Shymbergenov	Kazakhstan
bronze medal	Zeyad Ishaish	Jordan
bronze medal	Sailom Adi	Thailand

The men's welterweight (69 kilograms) event at the 2018 Asian Games took place from 24 August to 1 September 2018 at Jakarta International Expo Hall, Jakarta, Indonesia.

== Schedule ==
All times are Western Indonesia Time (UTC+07:00)

Date	Time	Event
Friday, 24 August 2018	14:00	Round of 32
Sunday, 26 August 2018	13:00	Round of 16
Tuesday, 28 August 2018	13:00	Quarterfinals
Friday, 31 August 2018	14:00	Semifinals
Saturday, 1 September 2018	14:00	Final

== Results ==
Legend

- WO — Won by walkover

=== Final ===
Final
Aslanbek Shymbergenov (KAZ)	1
Bobo-Usmon Baturov (UZB)	3

=== Top half ===
Round of 32
Waisuddin Ghawsi (AFG)
Trần Đức Thọ (VIE)	WO
Sarohatua Lumbantobing (INA)	0
Aslanbek Shymbergenov (KAZ)	5
Sangay Wangdi (BHU)	0
Manoj Kumar (IND)	5

Round of 16
Zeyad Ishaish (JOR)	5
Trần Đức Thọ (VIE)	0
Bishnu Prasad Ghale (NEP)	0
Thulasi Tharumalingam (QAT)	5
Gul Zaib (PAK)	0
Aslanbek Shymbergenov (KAZ)	5
Manoj Kumar (IND)	0
Abdurakhman Abdurakhmanov (KGZ)	5

Quarterfinals
Zeyad Ishaish (JOR)	5
Thulasi Tharumalingam (QAT)	0
Aslanbek Shymbergenov (KAZ)	5
Abdurakhman Abdurakhmanov (KGZ)	0

Semifinals
Zeyad Ishaish (JOR)	0
Aslanbek Shymbergenov (KAZ)	5

=== Bottom half ===
Round of 32
Joel Bacho (PHI)	1
Sajjad Kazemzadeh (IRI)	4
Bobo-Usmon Baturov (UZB)	5
Otgonbaataryn Byamba-Erdene (MGL)	0

Round of 16
Issei Aramoto (JPN)	0
Sajjad Kazemzadeh (IRI)	5
Timur Täjimow (TKM)	0
Sailom Adi (THA)	5
Lim Hyun-chul (KOR)	5
Abdulmouen Azziz (SYR)	0
Bobo-Usmon Baturov (UZB)	4
Maimaitituersun Qiong (CHN)	1

Quarterfinals
Sajjad Kazemzadeh (IRI)	0
Sailom Adi (THA)	5
Lim Hyun-chul (KOR)	0
Bobo-Usmon Baturov (UZB)	5

Semifinals
Sailom Adi (THA)	1
Bobo-Usmon Baturov (UZB)	4
