= Idigov =

Idigov or İdiqov is a Russian surname. Notable people with the surname include:

== Idigov ==
- Aslambek Idigov (born 1995), Russian boxer
- Tarkhan Idigov, Russian boxer

== İdiqov ==
- Ruslan İdiqov (born 1966), Azerbaijani footballer
