= Taskin =

Taskin is a masculine given name and a surname. Notable people with the name include:

== Given name ==
- Taşkın Aksoy (born 1967), German-Turkish football manager and former player
- Taşkın Çalış (born 1993), Turkish footballer
- Taskin Ahmed (born 1995), Bangladeshi cricketer

== Surname ==
- Ayşen Taşkın (born 1996), Turkish female boxer
- Dilan Yeşim Taşkın (born 2001), Turkish-Austrian footballer
- Émile-Alexandre Taskin (1853–1897), French operatic baritone, descendant of Pascal
- Ilter Tashkin (born 1994), German-Azerbaijani footballer
- Pascal Joseph Taskin (1723–1793), Belgian-French harpsichord and piano maker
