= 2025 IBA World Boxing Championships – Welterweight =

Welterweight at the 2025 IBA World Boxing Championships
- Venue: Dubai Duty Free Tennis Stadium
- Location: Dubai, United Arab Emirates
- Dates: 4–13 December
- Competitors: 36

Medalists
gold medal	Asadkhuja Muydinkhujaev	Uzbekistan
silver medal	Evgenii Kool	Russia
bronze medal	Alexandru Paraschiv	Moldova
bronze medal	Hovhannes Bachkov	Armenia

The Welterweight competition at the 2025 IBA Men's World Boxing Championships was held from 4 to 13 December 2025.

== Results ==
=== Finals ===
Semifinals
(Uzbekistan) Asadkhuja Muydinkhujaev	5
(Moldova) Alexandru Paraschiv	0
(Russia) Evgenii Kool	5
(Armenia) Hovhannes Bachkov	2

Final
(Uzbekistan) Asadkhuja Muydinkhujaev	5
(Russia) Evgenii Kool	0

=== Top half ===
==== Section 1 ====
Round of 64
(The Bahamas) Rashield Williams	RSC
(Samoa) Jason Wulf

Round of 32
(Uzbekistan) Asadkhuja Muydinkhujaev	5
(The Bahamas) Rashield Williams	0
(Italy) Pietro Loriga
Armen Mashakaryan	WO
(Eswatini) Khayelihle Mkhabela	0
(Brazil) Cássio Oliveira	5
(Zambia) Gerald Kabinda	1
(Kazakhstan) Sanatali Toltayev	4

Round of 16
(Uzbekistan) Asadkhuja Muydinkhujaev	4
Armen Mashakaryan	1
(Brazil) Cássio Oliveira	0
(Kazakhstan) Sanatali Toltayev	5

Quarterfinals
(Uzbekistan) Asadkhuja Muydinkhujaev	4
(Kazakhstan) Sanatali Toltayev	1

==== Section 2 ====
Round of 64
(India) Praveen Kumar	ABD
(Afghanistan) Yawari Amaun

Round of 32
(Tunisia) Zakaria Romdhani	RSC
(Cambodia) Sophors Vy
(Seychelles) Andrique Allisop	0
(Uganda) Bob Turyatemba	5
(Mongolia) Askharyn Jandos	4
(South Africa) Simamkele Damesi	0
(India) Praveen Kumar	0
(Moldova) Alexandru Paraschiv	5

Round of 16
(Tunisia) Zakaria Romdhani	0
(Uganda) Bob Turyatemba	5
(Mongolia) Askharyn Jandos	0
(Moldova) Alexandru Paraschiv	5

Quarterfinals
(Uganda) Bob Turyatemba
(Moldova) Alexandru Paraschiv	KO

=== Bottom half ===
==== Section 3 ====
Round of 64
(Greece) Dimitrios Nikolaou	0
(Argentina) Thomas Casazza	5

Round of 32
(Australia) Jake van Rooyen	0
(Argentina) Thomas Casazza	5
(Azerbaijan) Zaur Gahramanov	RSC
(The Gambia) Sheikh Sarr
(Guinea-Bissau) Mateus Barbosa da Costa	WO
(Cyprus) Stelios Tampouris
(Sri Lanka) Kobawaka Pathmasiri
(Russia) Evgenii Kool	RSC

Round of 16
(Argentina) Thomas Casazza	0
(Azerbaijan) Zaur Gahramanov	5
(Guinea-Bissau) Mateus Barbosa da Costa
(Russia) Evgenii Kool	KO

Quarterfinals
(Azerbaijan) Zaur Gahramanov	0
(Russia) Evgenii Kool	5

==== Section 4 ====
Round of 64
(Scotland) Leo Church	3
(Senegal) Cheikh Tidiane Diop	1

Round of 32
(Kyrgyzstan) Almaz Orozbekov	4
(Mozambique) Bernardo Marime	3
(Armenia) Hovhannes Bachkov	RSC
(Kenya) Wiseman Kavondo Mwathe
(Belarus) Vadzim Vauchok	4
(Tajikistan) Shamsher Saidov	1
(Scotland) Leo Church	0
(Serbia) Vakhid Abbasov	5

Round of 16
(Kyrgyzstan) Almaz Orozbekov	0
(Armenia) Hovhannes Bachkov	5
(Belarus) Vadzim Vauchok	WO
(Serbia) Vakhid Abbasov

Quarterfinals
(Armenia) Hovhannes Bachkov	5
(Belarus) Vadzim Vauchok	0
