= Vadim Musaev =

Russian professional boxer

Vadim Musaev Вадим Мусаев
Personal information
- Born: 3 January 1993 (age 33) Makhachkala, Dagestan, Russia
- Height: 1.80 m (5 ft 11 in)
- Weight: Light middleweight
- Website: http://vadimmusaev.ru/

Boxing career
- Stance: Southpaw

Boxing record
- Total fights: 15
- Wins: 15
- Win by KO: 9
Medal record
Men's amateur boxing
Representing (Russia) Russian Boxing Federation
World Championships
Silver medal – second place	2021 Belgrade	Light middleweight
Representing Russia
Strandzha Cup
Gold medal – first place	2022 Sofia	Light middleweight

Vadim Sharafidinovich Musaev (Russian: Вадим Шарафидинович Мусаев; born 3 January 1993) is a Russian professional boxer. As an amateur he won a silver medal at the 2021 World Championships. Since 2022, he has been training in Hollywood, Florida, US.

== Amateur/Olympic career ==
In February 2022, Vadim won the gold medal at the Strandzha Cup in Sofia.

== Professional career ==
Musaev debuted on 26 Nov 2016 in Pyatigorsk, winning a unanimous decision against Kantemir Kalazhokov. After picking up three more wins in Russia he moved to the US to further pursue a professional boxing career.

== Professional boxing record ==
15 fights	15 wins	0 losses
By knockout	9	0
By decision	6	0

No.	Result	Record	Opponent	Type	Round, time	Date	Location	Notes
15	Win	15–0	Farahat Manilola	UD	10	11 Jul 2026	VTB Arena, Moscow, Russia	
14	Win	14–0	Thulani Mbenge	TKO	3 (12), 1:54	12 Dsc 2025	Duty Free Tennis Stadium, Dubai, United Arab Emirates	Won IBO welterweight title
13	Win	13–0	Jose Miguel Borrego	UD	10	22 Jul 2025	Dushanbe, Tajikistan	Won vacant IBA Intercontinental welterweight title
12	Win	12–0	Novruz Huseynov	KO	1 (10), 0:24	28 Apr 2025	IBB Sports Arena, Istanbul, Turkey	
11	Win	11–0	Ray Seitzhanov	TKO	5 (8), 2:47	13 Dec 2024	Moscow, Russia	
10	Win	10–0	Paulus Amavila	TKO	4 (10), 1:10	8 Aug 2024	Ufa Arena, Ufa, Russia	Won vacant WBA Asia East welterweight title
9	Win	9–0	Sagadat Rakhmanul	UD	8	7 Jun 2024	Dynamo Volleyball Arena, Moscow, Russia	
8	Win	8–0	Jamshidbek Tojiboev	TKO	2 (6), 0:59	30 May 2024	Moscow, Russia	
7	Win	7–0	Zurab Chaniev	KO	1 (6), 0:52	7 Feb 2024	Moscow, Russia	
6	Win	6–0	Martin Alvarez Miranda	KO	1 (8), 2:03	19 Apr 2023	Whitesands Events Center, Plant City, Florida, U.S.	
5	Win	5–0	Enver Halili	TKO	1 (8), 1:42	9 Sep 2022	Whitesands Events Center, Plant City, Florida, U.S.	
4	Win	4–0	Artem Lim	TKO	3 (8), 0:53	15 May 2021	Soviet Wings Sport Palace, Moscow, Russia	
3	Win	3–0	Ali Kurbanmagomedov	UD	4	25 Mar 2017	RGK "Kapitan", Anapa, Russia	
2	Win	2–0	Emil Akhmedov	UD	4	12 Feb 2017	Bulldog Fight Club, Krasnodar, Russia	
1	Win	1–0	Kantemir Kalazhokov	UD	4	26 Nov 2016	Concert Hall "Russia", Pyatigorsk, Russia	
