= Yuri Falcão =

Brazilian boxer (born 2002)

Personal information
- National team: Brazil
- Born: 18 August 2002 (age 24) Vila Velha, Espírito Santo, Brazil
- Height: 1.70 m (5 ft 7 in)

Sport
- Country: Brazil
- Sport: Boxing
Medal record
Men's amateur boxing
Representing Brazil
World Championships
Silver medal – second place	2025 Liverpool	65 kg
Pan American Games
Bronze medal – third place	2023 Santiago	-63.5 kg
South American Games
Gold medal – first place	2026 Santa Fe	–65 kg

Yuri Falcão dos Reis (born 18 August 2002 in Vila Velha) is a Brazilian boxer. He is the nephew of Olympic medalists Yamaguchi Falcão and Esquiva Falcão.

== Career ==
In 2021, he competed in the 2021 AIBA Youth World Boxing Championships in Kielce, Poland, where he reached the quarterfinals in the -60 kg category.

He was champion of the Brazilian Boxing Championship in 2022 and 2023.

At the 2023 IBA Men's World Boxing Championships held in Tashkent, Uzbekistan, he won two fights, but in the round of 16, facing Olympic medalist and world champion from Cuba Lázaro Álvarez, he ended up being eliminated in the Light welterweight category.

At the 2023 Pan American Games held in Santiago, Chile, he won a bronze medal in the 63.5 kg category.

At the 2025 World Boxing Championships, he won four fights, reaching the final defeating olympic champion Erislandy Álvarez at the semifinal, and securing a silver medal.
