= Strandzha Cup =

Boxing competitions

The Strandzha Cup (Bulgarian: Купа Странджа, also spelled Strandja Cup and officially known as the Strandja Memorial) is an international amateur boxing tournament held annually in Bulgaria. It often determines who will qualify to compete at the upcoming summer Olympic games. The Strandja Cup is the oldest international amateur boxing competition in Europe. The first tournament was held in 1950 at the "Yunak" stadium in Sofia. The trophy is awarded to the best boxer of the tournament. The first cup was awarded to Hristo Popov, born 1931.

== Past editions of the tournament ==
Year	Host city	Strandja Cup Winner
2015	Sofia	(Bulgaria) Simeon Chamov
2014	Sofia	(Bulgaria) Tervel Pulev
2013	Sofia	(Bulgaria) Alexandur Alexandrov
2012	Sofia	(Bulgaria) Stefan Ivanov
2011	Pazardjik	(Bulgaria) Tervel Pulev
2010	Yambol	(Bulgaria) Detelin Dalakliev
2009	Plovdiv	(Bulgaria) Lyeben Todorov
2008	Plovdiv	(Ukraine) Oleksandr Usyk

Past Strandja Memorial Editions

== Host cities ==
- Sofia - 41 times
- Plovdiv - 9 times
- Yambol - 6 times
- Gabrovo - 1 times
- Veliko Tarnovo - 1 times
- Pleven - 1 times
- Burgas - 1 times

== Most successful fighters ==
- * means current champion
- (Bulgaria) Tsacho Andreikovski - 4 titles (1974, 1976, 1978, 1979)
- (Bulgaria) Daniel Petrov - 4 titles (1994, 1997, 1998, 1999)
- (Bulgaria) Serafim Todorov - 3 titles (1989, 1993, 1996)
- (Brazil) Beatriz Ferreira- 3 titles (2019, 2021,2023*)
- (India) Amit Panghal- 3 titles (2018, 2019, 2024)

== Notable participants ==
- (Soviet Union) Anatoli Bulakov
- (Cuba) Armando Martinez
- (Bulgaria) Petar Lesov
- (Bulgaria) Tontcho Tontchev
- (Bulgaria) Dimitar Stilianov
- (Bulgaria) Serafim Todorov
- (Bulgaria) Boris Georgiev
- (Bulgaria) Kubrat Pulev
- (United Kingdom) Amir Khan
- (United Kingdom) David Price
- (Russia) Alexander Povetkin
- (Italy) Roberto Cammarelle
- (United Kingdom) Billy Joe Saunders
- (Ukraine) Oleksandr Usyk
- (Ukraine) Wladimir Klitschko
- (Cuba) Félix Savón
- (Uzbekistan) Ruslan Chagaev
- (Russia) Vadim Musaev
- (Brazil) Beatriz Ferreira
- (India) Amit Panghal
