= Boxing at the 2023 Pan American Games – Men's 63.5 kg =

Men's 63.5 kg at the 2023 Pan American Games
- Venue: Olympic Training Center
- Start date: October 19, 2023
- End date: October 27, 2023
- Competitors: 18 from 18 nations

Medalists
Gold medal	Wyatt Sanford	Canada
Silver medal	Miguel Martínez	Mexico
Bronze medal	Yuri Falcão	Brazil
Bronze medal	Alexy de la Cruz	Dominican Republic

The Men's 63.5 kg competition of the boxing events at the 2023 Pan American Games in Santiago, Chile, was held between October 19 and 27 at the Olympic Training Center. A total of 18 boxers from 18 NOC's competed.

The two finalists will qualify for the 2024 Summer Olympics in Paris, France.

== Qualification ==
There was a quota of 130 boxers to compete at the games (ten per event). The host nation (Chile) received automatic qualification spots for all events. The remainder of the spots were awarded through various qualifying tournaments. However, the International Olympic Committee later decided the competition was an open registration event, meaning any NOC could enter a boxer into the event.

== Competition format ==
Like all Pan American boxing events, the competition is a straight single-elimination tournament. Both semifinal losers are awarded bronze medals, so no boxers compete again after their first loss. Bouts consist of 3 rounds "10-point must" scoring system used, where the winner of each round must be awarded 10 points and the loser a lesser amount, and the elimination of the padded headgear. Five judges scored each bout. The winner will be the boxer who scored the most at the end of the match.

== Results ==
Round of 32 (October 19)
Luciano Amaya (ARG)	RSC
Leodan Pezo (PER)
Kervens Bouche (HAI)
José Viáfara (COL)	RSC

Round of 16 (October 22)
Joshua Toussaint (DMA)
Luciano Amaya (ARG)	RSC
Wyatt Sanford (CAN)	5
Lázaro Álvarez (CUB)	0
Alston Ryan (ANT)	0
Samuel Contreras (ESA)	5
Tyshawn Jones (GRN)
Yuri Falcão (BRA)	RSC
Joel Williamson (GUY)	0
Alexy de la Cruz (DOM)	5
Emilio Garcia (USA)	5
Jesús Cova (VEN)	0
Miguel Martínez (MEX)	RSC
Sanji Williams (JAM)
José Viáfara (COL)	5
Christopher Simmons (PAN)	0

Quarterfinals (October 25)
Luciano Amaya (ARG)	0
Wyatt Sanford (CAN)	5
Samuel Contreras (ESA)	0
Yuri Falcão (BRA)	5
Alexy de la Cruz (DOM)	2
Emilio Garcia (USA)	0
Miguel Martínez (MEX)	3
José Viáfara (COL)	2

Semifinals (October 26)
Wyatt Sanford (CAN)	5
Yuri Falcão (BRA)	0
Alexy de la Cruz (DOM)	2
Miguel Martínez (MEX)	3

Final (October 27)
Wyatt Sanford (CAN)	5
Miguel Martínez (MEX)	0
