= Rabia Topuz =

Turkish women's boxer (born 2000)

Personal information
- Nationality: Turkish
- Born: 2 July 2000 (age 26) Malatya, Turkey
- Weight: 51 kg (112 lb)

Boxing career
Medal record
Women's amateur boxing
Representing Turkey
Islamic Solidarity Games
Gold medal – first place	2025 Riyadh	51 kg

Rabia Topuz (born 2 July 2000) is a Turkish female boxer who competes in the flyweight (51 kg) division.

== Sport career ==
Topuz is a member of Fenerbahçe Boxing.

At the 2022 European U22 Boxing Championships in Poreč, Croatia, she competed in the light flyweight (48–50 kg), and lost the quarterfinals.

In May 2024, she was hospitalized in the intensive care unit in Malatya due to a snake bite on her foot during a running training in a rural area.

She competed in the 51 kg event at the 2025 Solidary Games in Riyadh, Saudi Arabia, and won the gold medal.

== Personal life ==
A native of Malatya, Turkey, Rabia Topuz was born on 2 July 2000.

She and her family narrowly escaped being buried under the rubble of their destroyed house during the 2023 earthquake in Turkey. She continued to live with her family in a container provided by the Fenerbahçe club.
