= Evin Erginoğuz =

Turkish women's boxer (born 2002)

Personal information
- Nationality: Turkish
- Born: 5 February 2002 (age 24) Van,Turkey
- Weight: 60 kg (130 lb)

Boxing career
Medal record
Women's amateur boxing
Representing Turkey
Islamic Solidarity Games
Gold medal – first place	2025 Riyadh	60 kg

Evin Erginoğuz (born 5 February 2002) is a Turkish female boxer who competes in the lightweight (60 kg) division.

== Sport career ==
Erginoğuz started her boxing caerr around 2016. She has five Turkish champion titles in different age categories. She is a member of Fenerbahçe Boxing.

During the quarterfinals match at the 2021 World Championships in Belgrade, Serbia, her left shoulder was dislocated. End November that year, she underwent a surgery of arthroscopic instability repair on her shoulder at a hospital in Istanbul.

At the 2024 European U23 Boxing Championships in Sofia, Bulgaria, she lost the quarterfinals in the lightweight event.

She competed in the 60 kg event at the 2025 Solidary Games in Riyadh, Saudi Arabia, and won the gold medal.

== Personal life ==
A native of Van in eastern Turkey, Evin Erginoğuz was born on 5 February 2002.

She is a student in the Faculty of Sports science at the Van Yüzüncü Yıl University.
