= Boxing at the 2026 South American Games =

Boxing competitions at the 2026 South American Games

- Venue: Invencible Rafaela
- Dates: September 13–18
- Competitors: 83 from 13 nations

Boxing competitions at the 2026 South American Games in Rosario, Santa Fe, and Rafaela, Argentina, were held between September 13 and 18 at Invencible Rafaela, located within Distrito Joven in Rafaela.

A total of 14 events were expected to be contested (seven men's and seven women's). Ultimately, only 12 took place, with the women's weight classes being reduced from seven to five.

== Participating nations ==
A total of 13 nations registered athletes for the boxing events. Each nation was able to enter a maximum of 14 athletes (7 men and 7 women), one athlete for each weight category.

- Argentina (11)
- Bolivia (9)
- Brazil (12)
- Chile (2)
- Colombia (4)
- Curaçao (4)
- Ecuador (7)
- Guyana (4)
- Panama (3)
- Paraguay (6)
- Suriname (1)
- Uruguay (9)
- Venezuela (11)

== Medal summary ==
=== Medal table ===
* Host nation (Argentina)

Rank	Nation	Gold	Silver	Bronze	Total
1	Brazil	6	2	2	10
2	Venezuela	4	1	3	8
3	Ecuador	1	2	2	5
4	Uruguay	1	1	3	5
5	Argentina*	0	4	5	9
6	Colombia	0	2	2	4
7	Chile	0	0	2	2
8	Bolivia	0	0	1	1
8	Curaçao	0	0	1	1
8	Guyana	0	0	1	1
8	Panama	0	0	1	1
8	Paraguay	0	0	1	1
Totals (12 entries)		12	12	24	48

=== Medalists ===
==== Men's events ====
Event	Gold	Silver	Bronze
55 kg	Lucas García; Uruguay	Billy Arias; Ecuador	Santiago Tulián; Argentina
55 kg	Lucas García; Uruguay	Billy Arias; Ecuador	Michael Trindade; Brazil
60 kg	Luiz Gabriel Oliveira; Brazil	Santiago Celes; Argentina	Sergio López; Bolivia
60 kg	Luiz Gabriel Oliveira; Brazil	Santiago Celes; Argentina	Joaquín Villasante; Uruguay
65 kg	Yuri Falcão; Brazil	Santiago Cardozo; Uruguay	Fabian Williams; Curaçao
65 kg	Yuri Falcão; Brazil	Santiago Cardozo; Uruguay	Joiser Medina; Venezuela
70 kg	Kaian Reis; Brazil	Edinson Alvarado; Venezuela	José Rodríguez; Ecuador
70 kg	Kaian Reis; Brazil	Edinson Alvarado; Venezuela	Mateo Tavarone; Argentina
80 kg	Wanderley Pereira; Brazil	Gustiniano Mina; Ecuador	Juan Ortíz; Colombia
80 kg	Wanderley Pereira; Brazil	Gustiniano Mina; Ecuador	Diego Mejías; Venezuela
90 kg	Isaias Ribeiro; Brazil	Jhojan Caicedo; Colombia	Alfonso Parra; Venezuela
90 kg	Isaias Ribeiro; Brazil	Jhojan Caicedo; Colombia	Emmanuel Pompey; Guyana
+90 kg	Gerlón Congo; Ecuador	Joel Ramos; Brazil	Andrews Chávez; Chile
+90 kg	Gerlón Congo; Ecuador	Joel Ramos; Brazil	Enzo Gallardo; Argentina

==== Women's events ====
Event	Gold	Silver	Bronze
51 kg	Irismar Rojas; Venezuela	Yerlin Quiñones; Colombia	Tatiana Flores; Argentina
51 kg	Irismar Rojas; Venezuela	Yerlin Quiñones; Colombia	Yuliett Asprilla; Panama
54 kg	Diana Márquez; Venezuela	Melanie Martínez; Argentina	Kely Benítez; Colombia
54 kg	Diana Márquez; Venezuela	Melanie Martínez; Argentina	Denisse Bravo; Chile
57 kg	Omailyn Cegovia; Venezuela	Jucielen Romeu; Brazil	Minerva Mireles; Paraguay
57 kg	Omailyn Cegovia; Venezuela	Jucielen Romeu; Brazil	Luz Arancibia; Argentina
65 kg	Haziel Franco; Brazil	Lucía Muello; Argentina	María José Palacios; Ecuador
65 kg	Haziel Franco; Brazil	Lucía Muello; Argentina	Tatiana Bonnani; Uruguay
75 kg	Maryelis Burguillos; Venezuela	Lorena Balbuena; Argentina	Ailen Cabrera; Uruguay
75 kg	Maryelis Burguillos; Venezuela	Lorena Balbuena; Argentina	Adriele Nascimento; Brazil

== Results ==
=== Men's 55 kg ===
Quarterfinals
(Paraguay) Diego Morinigo	0
(Argentina) Santiago Tulián	5
(Ecuador) Billy Arias	5
(Panama) Luis Santos	0
(Bolivia) Noe Barrientos	0
(Uruguay) Lucas García	5
(Brazil) Michael Trindade	W
(Venezuela) Andrés Mendoza	L

Semifinals
(Argentina) Santiago Tulián	0
(Ecuador) Billy Arias	5
(Uruguay) Lucas García	3
(Brazil) Michael Trindade	2

Final
(Ecuador) Billy Arias	1
(Uruguay) Lucas García	4

=== Men's 60 kg ===
Quarterfinals
(Bolivia) Sergio López	4
(Paraguay) Castro Vázquez	0
(Venezuela) Wilson Acevedo	0
(Brazil) Luiz Gabriel Oliveira	5

Semifinals
(Argentina) Santiago Celes	W
(Bolivia) Sergio López	L
(Brazil) Luiz Gabriel Oliveira	5
(Uruguay) Joaquín Villasante	0

Final
(Argentina) Santiago Celes	0
(Brazil) Luiz Gabriel Oliveira	5

=== Men's 65 kg ===
Round of 16
(Bolivia) José Añez	L
(Suriname) Domelzo Schet	W

Quarterfinals
(Curaçao) Fabian Williams	5
(Suriname) Domelzo Schet	0
(Uruguay) Santiago Cardozo	5
(Paraguay) Arnold Centurión	0
(Venezuela) Joiser Medina	4
(Ecuador) Jhancarlo Anchico	1
(Panama) Cristofer Vargas	0
(Brazil) Yuri Falcão	5

Semifinals
(Curaçao) Fabian Williams	1
(Uruguay) Santiago Cardozo	4
(Venezuela) Joiser Medina	0
(Brazil) Yuri Falcão	5

Final
(Uruguay) Santiago Cardozo
(Brazil) Yuri Falcão	KO

=== Men's 70 kg ===
Round 16
(Paraguay) Gonzalo Weiler	5
(Guyana) Shakquain James	0

Quarterfinals
(Brazil) Kaian Reis	5
(Paraguay) Gonzalo Weiler	0
(Ecuador) José Rodríguez	4
(Uruguay) Jorge Sabatel	1
(Argentina) Mateo Tavarone	RSC
(Curaçao) Jady Gogulski
(Venezuela) Edinson Alvarado	W
(Bolivia) Alejandro Villagómez	L

Semifinals
(Brazil) Kaian Reis	5
(Ecuador) José Rodríguez	0
(Argentina) Mateo Tavarone	0
(Venezuela) Edinson Alvarado	5

Final
(Brazil) Kaian Reis	5
(Venezuela) Edinson Alvarado	0

=== Men's 80 kg ===
Quarterfinals
(Colombia) Juan Ortíz	4
(Paraguay) Lino Ferreira	1
(Uruguay) Enzo Díaz	0
(Ecuador) Gustiniano Mina	5
(Venezuela) Diego Mejías	RSC
(Bolivia) Josué Terceros
(Argentina) Víctor Roldán	0
(Brazil) Wanderley Pereira	5

Semifinals
(Colombia) Juan Ortíz	2
(Ecuador) Gustiniano Mina	3
(Venezuela) Diego Mejías	0
(Brazil) Wanderley Pereira	5

Final
(Ecuador) Gustiniano Mina	0
(Brazil) Wanderley Pereira	5

=== Men's 90 kg ===
Quarterfinals
(Argentina) Pedro Arjona	0
(Venezuela) Alfonso Parra	5
(Guyana) Emmanuel Pompey	5
(Bolivia) Jimmy Núñez	0
(Colombia) Jhojan Caicedo	RSC
(Uruguay) Gonzalo Deleón

Semifinals
(Brazil) Isaias Ribeiro	5
(Venezuela) Alfonso Parra	0
(Guyana) Emmanuel Pompey
(Colombia) Jhojan Caicedo	RSC

Final
(Brazil) Isaias Ribeiro	4
(Colombia) Jhojan Caicedo	1

=== Men's +90 kg ===
Quarterfinals
(Bolivia) Miguel Pardo
(Brazil) Joel Ramos	RSC

Semifinals
(Chile) Andrews Chávez
(Brazil) Joel Ramos	RSC
(Argentina) Enzo Gallardo	2
(Ecuador) Gerlón Congo	3

Final
(Brazil) Joel Ramos	2
(Ecuador) Gerlón Congo	3

=== Women's 51 kg ===
Quarterfinals
(Argentina) Tatiana Flores	3
(Brazil) Caroline Almeida	2
(Panama) Yuliett Asprilla	3
(Bolivia) Patricia Rojas	2

Semifinals
(Colombia) Yerlin Quiñones	3
(Argentina) Tatiana Flores	2
(Panama) Yuliett Asprilla	1
(Venezuela) Irismar Rojas	4

Final
(Colombia) Yerlin Quiñones	1
(Venezuela) Irismar Rojas	4

=== Women's 54 kg ===
Quarterfinals
(Brazil) Tatiana Chagas	2
(Argentina) Melanie Martínez	3
(Chile) Denisse Bravo	W
(Bolivia) Ayda Rodríguez	L
(Venezuela) Diana Márquez	5
(Uruguay) Antonella Barbazal

Semifinals
(Colombia) Kely Benítez	0
(Argentina) Melanie Martínez	5
(Chile) Denisse Bravo	0
(Venezuela) Diana Márquez	5

Final
(Argentina) Melanie Martínez	1
(Venezuela) Diana Márquez	4

=== Women's 57 kg ===
Quarterfinals
(Guyana) Akeelah Valcooten	0
(Paraguay) Minerva Mereles	5
(Ecuador) Helen Sánchez	0
(Argentina) Luz Arancibia	5

Semifinals
(Venezuela) Omailyn Cegovia	5
(Paraguay) Minerva Mireles	0
(Argentina) Luz Arancibia	1
(Brazil) Jucielen Romeu	4

Final
(Venezuela) Omailyn Cegovia	3
(Brazil) Jucielen Romeu	2

=== Women's 65 kg ===
Quarterfinals
(Venezuela) Youly León	0
(Argentina) Lucía Muello	5

Semifinals
(Ecuador) María José Palacios	0
(Argentina) Lucía Muello	5
(Brazil) Haziel Franco	5
(Uruguay) Tatiana Bonnani	0

Final
(Argentina) Lucía Muello	2
(Brazil) Haziel Franco	3

=== Women's 75 kg ===
Semifinals
(Venezuela) Maryelis Burguillos	5
(Uruguay) Ailen Cabrera	0
(Argentina) Lorena Balbuena	W
(Brazil) Adriele Nascimento	L

Final
(Venezuela) Maryelis Burguillos	4
(Argentina) Lorena Balbuena	1
