= Kaedyn Kamara =

English footballer

Personal information
- Full name: Kaedyn Kabbar Kamara
- Date of birth: 29 November 2005 (age 20)
- Place of birth: Liverpool, England
- Position: Midfielder

Team information
- Current team: Preston North End

Youth career
- –2022: Burnley
- 2022–: Preston North End

Senior career*
Years	Team	Apps	(Gls)
2023–	Preston North End	0	(0)
2024	→ Workington (loan)	10	(4)
2025	→ Marine (loan)	3	(0)
2025	→ Cork City (loan)	10	(0)
2026	→ Ross County (loan)	3	(0)
- * Club domestic league appearances and goals as of 23:20, 2 February 2026 (UTC)

Kaedyn Kabbar Kamara (born 29 November 2005) is an English professional footballer who plays as a midfielder for EFL Championship club Preston North End.

== Career ==
Kamara is a youth product of Burnley, before moving to the youth academy of Preston North End in June 2022. He made his professional debut with Preston North End as a late substitute in a 3–1 FA Cup win over Huddersfield Town on 7 January 2023.

On 10 August 2024 Kamara joined Northern Premier League side Workington on loan.

On 10 January 2025 Kamara joined Marine on loan until the end of the season. After returning from his loan, he signed his first professional contract, signing a two-year-contract with Preston.

On 22 July 2025, Kamara signed for League of Ireland Premier Division club Cork City on loan until the end of their season in November, joining Preston teammate Kitt Nelson who was already on loan at the club.

On 2 February 2026, Kamara joined Scottish Championship club Ross County on a loan deal until the end of the season. He played 3 games in the league for them, which consisted of a red card, after the Red he never played for them again.

== Personal life ==
Kamara was a national boxing champion and world champion in kickboxing away from football as a youth. His brother Odel is an English international boxer.
