= Odel Kamara =

English boxer (born 2003)

Personal information
- Nickname: King
- Born: 22 December 2003 (age 22) Liverpool, Merseyside, England
- Weight: Light-middleweight

Boxing career

Boxing record
- Total fights: 1
- Wins: 1
- Win by KO: 1
Medal record
World Championships
Bronze medal – third place	2025 Liverpool	70 kg

Odel Kamara (born 22 December 2003) is an English professional boxer. As an amateur he won a bronze medal in the 70 kg division at the 2025 World Boxing Championships.

== Amateur career ==
Fighting out of Salisbury ABC, Kamara won the 71 kg category at the 2024 World Boxing Cup finals in Sheffield, defeating Japan's Sewon Okazawa by unanimous decision in the final.

He was chosen to represent England in the 70 kg division at the 2025 World Boxing Championships in his hometown of Liverpool. In his opening bout, Kamara forced his opponent, Shpetim Bajoku from Kosovo, to take three standing eight counts before winning via unanimous decision. Next he knocked Canada's Kuwardeep Manu to the canvas just three seconds into the first round of their round-of-16 contest and went on to claim a unanimous decision victory. Kamara defeated Otgonbaataryn Byamba-Erdene of Mongolia, again via unanimous decision, in the quarter-finals. He lost to Kazakhstan's Torekhan Sabyrkhan via 4:1 split decision in the semi-finals and was therefore awarded a bronze medal.

== Professional career ==
On 2 June 2026, Kamara announced he had left the GB Boxing set-up and was turning professional having a signed a management deal with Sam Jones. On 17 August 2026, he agreed a promotional contract with Eddie Hearn led Matchroom Boxing and it was revealed that he would be trained by Tony Simms. Two days later it was announced that Kamara would make his professional debut at the Utilita Arena in Birmingham on 3 October 2026. He fought Thodoris Ritzakis in a four-round bout, knocking his opponent to the canvas in the first and winning by technical knockout when the referee stopped the fight in the third.

== Personal life ==
Kamara's brother Kaedyn is a professional footballer. He studied biomedical engineering at the University of Bolton. Kamara supports Liverpool F.C.

== Professional boxing record ==
1 fight	1 win	0 losses
By knockout	1	0

No.	Result	Record	Opponent	Type	Round, time	Date	Location	Notes
1	Win	1–0	Thodoris Ritzakis	TKO	3 (4), 2:53	3 Oct 2026	Utilita Arena, Birmingham, England	
