= Boxing at the 2025 Islamic Solidarity Games =

- Venue: The Promenade Art Tower
- Dates: 5—10 November 2025
- Competitors: 69 from 17 nations

The boxing tournament at the 2025 Islamic Solidarity Games in Riyadh was held between 5—10 November 2025. The boxing competition took place at The Promenade Art Tower in Saudi Arabia.

== Medal table ==
* Host nation (Saudi Arabia)

Rank	Nation	Gold	Silver	Bronze	Total
1	Turkey	3	2	1	6
2	Uzbekistan	3	1	2	6
3	Azerbaijan	1	3	2	6
4	Algeria	1	2	2	5
5	Egypt	1	0	1	2
5	Jordan	1	0	1	2
7	Kyrgyzstan	0	1	0	1
7	Nigeria	0	1	0	1
9	Saudi Arabia*	0	0	4	4
10	Pakistan	0	0	2	2
11	Iran	0	0	1	1
11	Iraq	0	0	1	1
11	Palestine	0	0	1	1
11	Uganda	0	0	1	1
Totals (14 entries)		10	10	19	39

== Medal overview ==
=== Men ===
Event	Gold	Silver	Bronze
55 kg	Amir Kelany; Egypt	Mohamed Abbas; Algeria	Semih Gümüş; Turkey
55 kg	Amir Kelany; Egypt	Mohamed Abbas; Algeria	Qudrat Ullah; Pakistan
60 kg	Madiyar Daniyarov; Uzbekistan	Muhammadali Gasymzade; Azerbaijan	Thamer Almatrfi; Saudi Arabia
60 kg	Madiyar Daniyarov; Uzbekistan	Muhammadali Gasymzade; Azerbaijan	Danial Shahbakhsh; Iran
65 kg	Abdulloh Madaminov; Uzbekistan	Jugurtha Ait Bekka; Algeria	Mousa Alhawsaw; Saudi Arabia
65 kg	Abdulloh Madaminov; Uzbekistan	Jugurtha Ait Bekka; Algeria	Ali Al-Sarray; Iraq
70 kg	Zeyad Ishaish; Jordan	Nuradin Rustambek Uulu; Kyrgyzstan	Sarkhan Aliyev; Azerbaijan
70 kg	Zeyad Ishaish; Jordan	Nuradin Rustambek Uulu; Kyrgyzstan	Ahmed Hekal; Egypt
80 kg	Saidjamshid Jafarov; Azerbaijan	Sultan Osmanlı; Turkey	Alfred Ojok; Uganda
80 kg	Saidjamshid Jafarov; Azerbaijan	Sultan Osmanlı; Turkey	Hussein Ishaish; Jordan

=== Women ===
Event	Gold	Silver	Bronze
51 kg	Rabia Topuz; Turkey	Zainab Adeshina; Nigeria	Zilolakhon Yusufova; Uzbekistan
51 kg	Rabia Topuz; Turkey	Zainab Adeshina; Nigeria	Fatiha Mansouri; Algeria
54 kg	Ayşen Taşkın; Turkey	Nargiz Zeynalova; Azerbaijan	Uzukjamol Yunusova; Uzbekistan
57 kg	Khumoranobu Mamajonova; Uzbekistan	Aynur Mikaylova; Azerbaijan	Nora Abu Nab; Palestine
57 kg	Khumoranobu Mamajonova; Uzbekistan	Aynur Mikaylova; Azerbaijan	Chahira Selmouni; Algeria
60 kg	Evin Erginoğuz; Turkey	Odinakhon Ismoilova; Uzbekistan	Fatima Zahra; Pakistan
60 kg	Evin Erginoğuz; Turkey	Odinakhon Ismoilova; Uzbekistan	Ragad Al-Naimi; Saudi Arabia
65 kg	Ichrak Chaib; Algeria	Berfin Kabak; Turkey	Fatima Mehdiyeva; Azerbaijan
65 kg	Ichrak Chaib; Algeria	Berfin Kabak; Turkey	Fatima Al-Naimi; Saudi Arabia

== Participating nations ==
A total of 69 athletes from 17 nations competed in boxing at the 2025 Islamic Solidarity Games:

1. Afghanistan (1)
2. Algeria (7)
3. Azerbaijan (7)
4. Egypt (3)
5. Iran (5)
6. Iraq (2)
7. Jordan (2)
8. Kyrgyzstan (3)
9. Libya (2)
10. Nigeria (2)
11. Pakistan (4)
12. Palestine (2)
13. Saudi Arabia (9)
14. Sudan (2)
15. Turkey (8)
16. Uganda (2)
17. Uzbekistan (8)

== Results ==
=== Men's 55 kg ===
Round of 16
Abbas Al-Sarray (IRQ)	2
Semih Gümüş (TUR)	3

Quarterfinals
Islam Torobaev (KGZ)	1
Semih Gümüş (TUR)	3
Mohamed Abbas (ALG)	4
Wasim Abusal (PLE)	1
Yousif Hassa (SUD)
Qudrat Ullah (PAK)	RSC-I R3
Mohammed Al-Muwallad (KSA)	0
Amir Kelany (EGY)	5

Semifinals
Semih Gümüş (TUR)	2
Mohamed Abbas (ALG)	3
Qudrat Ullah (PAK)	2
Amir Kelany (EGY)	3

Final
Mohamed Abbas (ALG)	1
Amir Kelany (EGY)	4

=== Men's 60 kg ===
Quarterfinals
Jimmy Adriko (UGA)	0
Muhammadali Gasymzade (AZE)	5
Ryspek Bektenov (KGZ)	0
Danial Shahbakhsh (IRI)	5
Madiyar Daniyarov (UZB)	ABD
Muayid Okashah (LBA)

Semifinals
Thamer Almatrfi (KSA)
Muhammadali Gasymzade (AZE)	RSC R1
Danial Shahbakhsh (IRI)	1
Madiyar Daniyarov (UZB)	4

Final
Muhammadali Gasymzade (AZE)
Madiyar Daniyarov (UZB)	WO

=== Men's 65 kg ===
Quarterfinals		Semifinals		Final
Yazin Al-Huwayj (LBA)	0
Ait Bekka Jughurta (ALG)	5	Ait Bekka Jughurta (ALG)	3
Mousa Alhawsaw (KSA)	5	Mousa Alhawsaw (KSA)	2
Ahmed Abdalgader (SUD)	0			Ait Bekka Jughurta (ALG)	0
Ali Habibinezhad (IRI)	0			Abdulloh Madaminov (UZB)	5
Ali Al-Sarray (IRQ)	5	Ali Al-Sarray (IRQ)	1
Abdulloh Madaminov (UZB)	4	Abdulloh Madaminov (UZB)	4
Ridwan Opeyemi Raheem (NGR)	1

=== Men's 70 kg ===
Quarterfinals		Semifinals		Final
		Zeyad Ishaish (JOR)	5
Sarkhan Aliyev (AZE)	4	Sarkhan Aliyev (AZE)	0
Samandar Habibullayev (UZB)	1			Zeyad Ishaish (JOR)	5
Ahmed Hekal (EGY)	3			Nuradin Rustambek Uulu (KGZ)	0
Majed Issa (KSA)	2	Ahmed Hekal (EGY)	2
Nuradin Rustambek Uulu (KGZ)	3	Nuradin Rustambek Uulu (KGZ)	3
Necat Ekinci (TUR)	2

=== Men's 80 kg ===
Round of 16
Yousuf Gulzad (AFG)	0
Fares Elsharkawi (EGY)	5

Quarterfinals
Sultan Osmanlı (TUR)	5
Fares Elsharkawi (EGY)	0
Alfred Ojok (UGA)	5
Mohammad Nourani (IRI)	0
Mohammed Alsubhi (KSA)
Hussein Ishaish (JOR)	RSC R2
Saidjamshid Jafarov (AZE)	5
Abdou Mustapha (ALG)	0

Semifinals
Sultan Osmanlı (TUR)	5
Alfred Ojok (UGA)	0
Hussein Ishaish (JOR)	0
Saidjamshid Jafarov (AZE)	5

Final
Sultan Osmanlı (TUR)	1
Saidjamshid Jafarov (AZE)	4

=== Women's 51 kg ===
Quarterfinals
Yara Alamri (KSA)
Zilolakhon Yusufova (UZB)	RSC R2
Rabia Topuz (TUR)	5
Maria Rind (PAK)	0
Ghazaleh Rasouli (IRI)
Zainab Adeshina (NGR)	RSC R1
Fatiha Mansouri (ALG)	5
Zeynab Rahimova (AZE)	0

Semifinals
Zilolakhon Yusufova (UZB)	1
Rabia Topuz (TUR)	4
Zainab Adeshina (NGR)	4
Fatiha Mansouri (ALG)	1

Final
Rabia Topuz (TUR)	RSC R3
Zainab Adeshina (NGR)

=== Women's 54 kg ===
Semifinals		Final
		Nargiz Zeynalova (AZE)	0
Uzukjamol Yunusova (UZB)	0	Ayşen Taşkın (TUR)	5
Ayşen Taşkın (TUR)	5

=== Women's 57 kg ===
Quarterfinals		Semifinals		Final
		Nora Abu Nab (PLE)	0
Hadeel Ashour (KSA)	0	Aynur Mikaylova (AZE)	5
Aynur Mikaylova (AZE)	5			Aynur Mikaylova (AZE)	0
Laura Akram (PAK)	0			Khumoranobu Mamajonova (UZB)	5
Khumoranobu Mamajonova (UZB)	5	Khumoranobu Mamajonova (UZB)	3
Ece Asude Ediz (TUR)	0	Chahira Selmouni (ALG)	2
Chahira Selmouni (ALG)	5

=== Women's 60 kg ===
Quarterfinals		Semifinals		Final
		Odinakhon Ismoilova (UZB)	3
Fatima Zahra (PAK)	5	Fatima Zahra (PAK)	2
Hamda Melissa (ALG)	0			Odinakhon Ismoilova (UZB)	0
				Evin Erginoğuz (TUR)	5
		Evin Erginoğuz (TUR)	5
		Ragad Al-Naimi (KSA)	0

=== Women's 65 kg ===
Quarterfinals		Semifinals		Final
		Fatima Mehdiyeva (AZE)	0
Ichrak Chaib (ALG)	5	Ichrak Chaib (ALG)	5
Mohira Akhmedova (UZB)	0			Ichrak Chaib (ALG)	3
Berfin Kabak (TUR)	RSC R1			Berfin Kabak (TUR)	2
Neda Kosari (IRI)		Berfin Kabak (TUR)	RSC R1
		Fatima Al-Naimi (KSA)
