= Dulat Bekbauov =

Kazakh boxer

Personal information
- Nationality: Kazakhstan
- Born: 1994 or 1995 (age 31–32)

Boxing career
Medal record
Men's amateur boxing
Representing Kazakhstan
IBA World Championships
Silver medal – second place	2023 Tashkent	Welterweight
Asian Championships
Silver medal – second place	2022 Amman	Welterweight
Silver medal – second place	2024 Chiang Mai	Welterweight

Dulat Bekbauov (born 1994/1995) is a Kazakh boxer. He competed at the 2023 IBA Men's World Boxing Championships, winning the silver medal in the welterweight event.

Bekbauov is currently serving a two-year ban set to expire in November 2027 for an anti-doping rule violation for whereabouts failures.
