= Ikhtiar Nishonov =

Kyrgyz boxer

Personal information
- Nationality: Kyrgyzstan

Boxing career
Medal record
Men's amateur boxing
Representing Kyrgyzstan
IBA World Championships
Bronze medal – third place	2025 Dubai	Light middleweight

Ikhtiar Nishonov is a Kyrgyz boxer. He competed at the 2025 IBA Men's World Boxing Championships, winning the bronze medal in the light middleweight event.
