= Boxing at the 2023 Pan American Games – Men's 71 kg =

Men's 71 kg at the 2023 Pan American Games
- Venue: Olympic Training Center
- Start date: October 22, 2023
- End date: October 27, 2023
- Competitors: 15 from 15 nations

Medalists
Gold medal	Marco Verde	Mexico
Silver medal	José Rodríguez	Ecuador
Bronze medal	Eduardo Beckford	Panama
Bronze medal	Junior Petanqui	Canada

The Men's 71 kg competition of the boxing events at the 2023 Pan American Games in Santiago, Chile, was held between October 22 and 27 at the Olympic Training Center. A total of 15 boxers from 15 NOC's competed.

The two finalists will qualify for the 2024 Summer Olympics in Paris, France.

== Qualification ==
There was a quota of 130 boxers to compete at the games (ten per event). The host nation (Chile) received automatic qualification spots for all events. The remainder of the spots were awarded through various qualifying tournaments. However, the International Olympic Committee later decided the competition was an open registration event, meaning any NOC could enter a boxer into the event.

== Competition format ==
Like all Pan American boxing events, the competition is a straight single-elimination tournament. Both semifinal losers are awarded bronze medals, so no boxers compete again after their first loss. Bouts consist of 3 rounds "10-point must" scoring system used, where the winner of each round must be awarded 10 points and the loser a lesser amount, and the elimination of the padded headgear. Five judges scored each bout. The winner will be the boxer who scored the most at the end of the match.

== Results ==
Round of 16 (October 22)
Jhonny Fernández (DOM)	0
Jhonatan Arboleda (COL)	5
Jorge Cuéllar (CUB)	0
Marco Verde (MEX)	5
Ángel Llanos (PUR)	0
Omari Jones (USA)	4
Darrius Jackson (HAI)	0
Christiann Palacio (VEN)	5
Aaron Prince (TTO)	0
Junior Petanqui (CAN)	5
Joel Mafauad (ARG)	KO
Tomás Barros (CHI)
Wanderson de Oliveira (BRA)	1
José Rodríguez (ECU)	4

Quarterfinals (October 25)
Eduardo Beckford (PAN)	RSC
Jhonatan Arboleda (COL)
Marco Verde (MEX)	5
Omari Jones (USA)	0
Christiann Palacio (VEN)	1
Junior Petanqui (CAN)	4
Joel Mafauad (ARG)	0
José Rodríguez (ECU)	5

Semifinals (October 26)
Eduardo Beckford (PAN)	0
Marco Verde (MEX)	5
Junior Petanqui (CAN)	0
José Rodríguez (ECU)	4

Final (October 27)
Marco Verde (MEX)	5
José Rodríguez (ECU)	0
