= Asadkhuja Muydinkhujaev =

Uzbekistani boxer (born 2001)

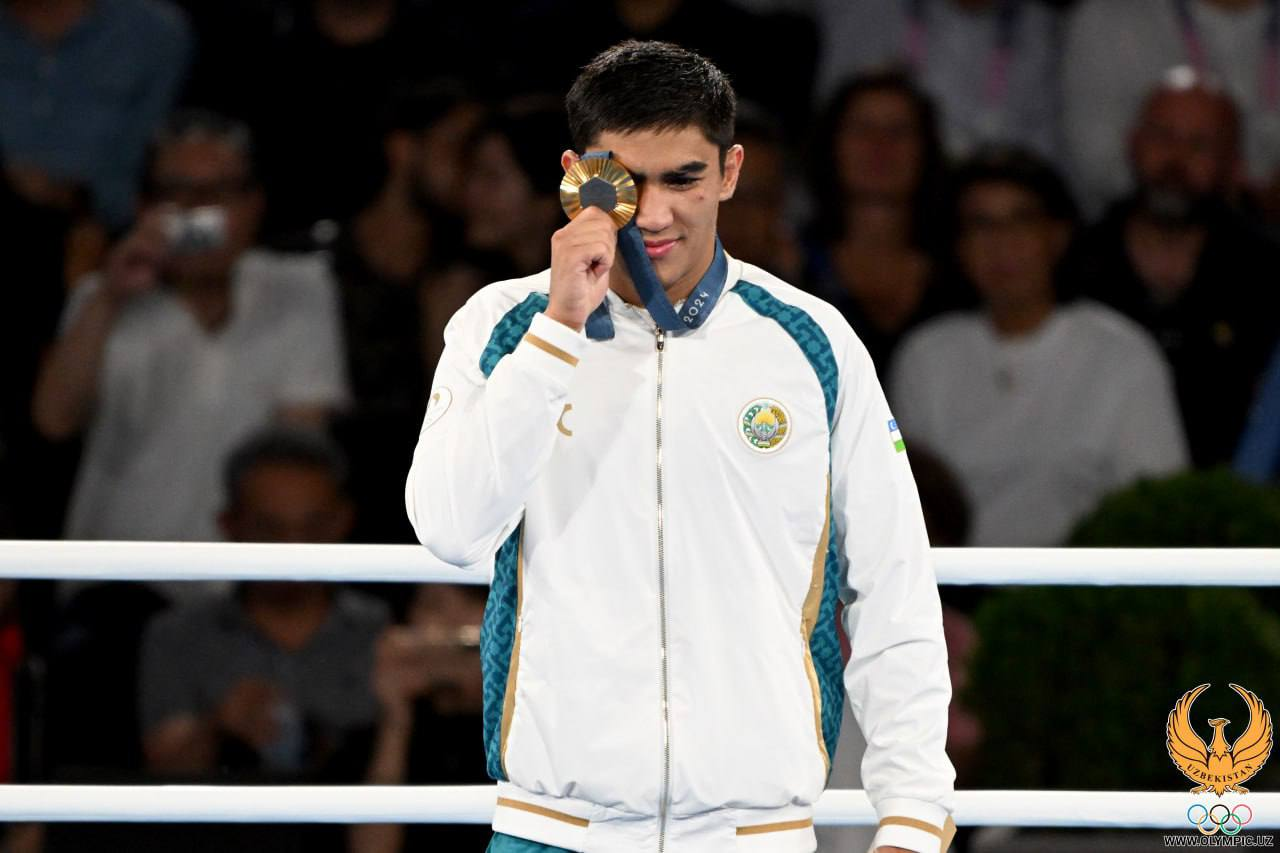
- Muydinkhujaev at the 2024 Summer Olympics

Personal information
- Born: 8 May 2001 (age 25) Ferghana, Uzbekistan
- Height: 1.74 m (5 ft 9 in)
- Weight: Welterweight

Boxing career
- Stance: Southpaw

Boxing record
- Total fights: 2
- Wins: 2
- Win by KO: 1
- Losses: 0
- Draws: 0
- No contests: 0
Medal record
Men's amateur boxing
Representing Uzbekistan
Olympic Games
Gold medal – first place	2024 Paris	Welterweight
World Championships
Gold medal – first place	2025 Liverpool	65 kg
IBA World Championships
Gold medal – first place	2023 Tashkent	Welterweight
Gold medal – first place	2025 Dubai	Welterweight
Asian Championships
Bronze medal – third place	2022 Amman	Welterweight

Asadkhuja Muydinkhujaev (Uzbek: Asadxoʻja Moʻydinxoʻjayev, born 8 May 2001) is an Uzbek boxer, gold medalist of 2023 IBA Men's World Boxing Championships in welterweight category and bronze medalist of 2022 Asian Amateur Boxing Championships that held in Amman, Jordan. Asadkhuja also won gold at the 2024 Summer Olympics in the welterweight category.

== Biography ==
Asadkhuja was born on 8 May 2001 in Fergana, Rishtan. He started to train boxing at Fergana sports College of Olympic reserve when he was 13.

=== Amateur career ===
- 2016 winner of 14. President Heydar Aliyev Junior Cup in 46 kg (Baku, Azerbaijan)
- 2016 winner of Junior Tournament Bekabad, Uzbekistan in 44 kg
- 2016 winner of Uzbek Junior National Championships Kokand in 44 kg
- 2017 winner of International Junior Tournament in 52 kg (Margilan, Uzbekistan)
- 2017 silver medalist of Uzbek Junior National Championships (Urgench, Uzbekistan)
- 2019 Winner of te International Junior Boxing Tournament in 64 kg (Anapa, Russia)
- 2020 National Champion of Uzbekistan (Elite) in 64 kg (Tashkent, Uzbekistan)
- 2022 National Champion of Uzbekistan (Elite) in 67 kg (Tashkent, Uzbekistan)
- 2024 gold medalist of the Paris Summer Olympics in 71 kg (Paris, France)

==== World Boxing Championships ====
In 2021, he participated in his first amateur Elite IBA World Boxing Championships, winning his first two bouts against Eugene McKeever and Ahmed Harara and losing in his third bout against Japanese boxer Sewon Okazawa.

In 2023, at the IBA World Boxing Championships in Tashkent, Uzbekistan, he became world champion in the welterweight category by beating Yuto Wakita (5–0), Kiryl Samadurau (5–0); Cuban Roniel Iglesias (4–3) in the quarterfinal, Battömöriin Misheelt (5–0) in the semifinals, and Dulat Bekbauov (5–0) in the final.

==== Asian Boxing Championships ====
In 2022 at the Asian Amateur Boxing Championships Muydinkhujaev competed in 67 kg and became the bronze medalist of Asian Championships.

=== Professional career ===
Muydinkhujaev signed a promotional contract with Frank Warren led Queensbury in November 2025, making his professional debut that same month.

== Professional boxing record ==
2 fights	2 wins	0 losses
By knockout	1	0
By decision	1	0

No.	Result	Record	Opponent	Type	Round, time	Date	Location	Notes
2	Win	2–0	Aidos Tastayev	PTS	6	16 May 2026	Keepmoat Stadium, Doncaster, England	
1	Win	1–0	Aidos Tastayev	TKO	2 (6), 1:10	28 Nov 2025	Yunost Sport Palace, Chelyabinsk, Russia	
