= Marco Verde =

Mexican boxer (born 2002)

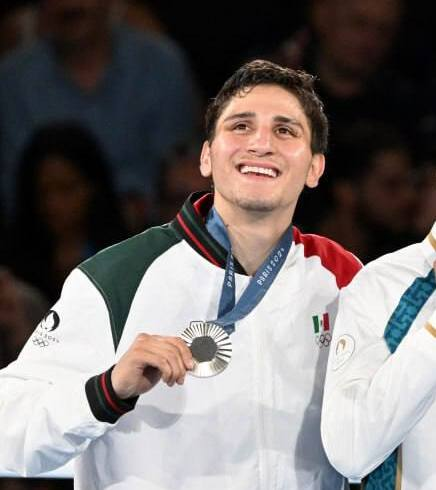
- Verde at the 2024 Olympic medal ceremony

Personal information
- Nickname: Green
- Born: Marco Alonso Verde Álvarez; 11 February 2002 (age 24) Mazatlán, Sinaloa, Mexico
- Height: 1.75 m (5 ft 9 in)
- Weight: Super middleweight

Boxing career
- Reach: 1.79 m (70 in)
- Stance: Southpaw

Boxing record
- Total fights: 6
- Wins: 6
- Win by KO: 3
Medal record
Men's amateur boxing
Representing Mexico
Olympic Games
Silver medal – second place	2024 Paris	Welterweight
Pan American Games
Gold medal – first place	2023 Santiago	Welterweight
Central American and Caribbean Games
Gold medal – first place	2023 San Salvador	Welterweight

Marco Alonso Verde Álvarez (born 11 February 2002) is a Mexican professional boxer. As an amateur, he won an Olympic silver medal in the 2024 Summer Olympics.

== Amateur career ==
Verde won the gold medal in the 2023 Pan American Games in Boxing in the 71 kg category. He also won the silver medal in the welterweight category at the 2024 Summer Olympics after losing the final bout against Uzbek Asadkhuja Muydinkhujaev.

=== Olympic results ===
2024 – Paris

- Round of 16 – defeated Tiago Muxanga (Mozambique) 3–2
- Quarterfinals – defeated Nishant Dev (India) 4–1
- Semifinals – defeated Lewis Richardson (Great Britain) 3–2
- Final – lost to Asadkhuja Muydinkhujaev (Uzbekistan) 0–5 (won silver medal)

== Professional career ==
Verde became professional in 2025. He made his professional debut on 3 May 2025, defeating Michel Galván by technical knockout in Riyadh, Saudi Arabia.

== Personal life ==
His father Manuel was also a boxer and competed in the men's light heavyweight event at the 1992 Summer Olympics.

== Professional boxing record ==
6 fights	6 wins	0 losses
By knockout	3	0
By decision	3	0

No.	Result	Record	Opponent	Type	Round, time	Date	Location	Notes
4	Win	4–0	Raphael Igbokwe	UD	6	13 December 2025	Centro de Usos Múltiples, Mazatlán, Mexico	
3	Win	3–0	Sona Akale	TKO	4 (6), 1:11	13 September 2025	Allegiant Stadium, Paradise, Nevada, U.S.	
2	Win	2–0	Cristian Montero	UD	6	12 July 2025	Polideportivo Juan S. Millán, Culiacán, Mexico	
1	Win	1–0	Michel Polina	TKO	1 (6), 1:34	3 May 2025	ANB Arena, Riyadh, Saudi Arabia	
