= Tiago Muxanga =

Mozambican boxer (born 2000)

Personal information
- Nationality: Mozambique
- Born: 12 September 2000 (age 25)

Boxing career
Medal record
Men's amateur boxing
Representing Mozambique
Commonwealth Games
| Silver medal – second place | 2022 Birmingham | Light middleweight |

Tiago Osório Muxanga (born 12 September 2000) is a Mozambican boxer. He competed at the 2022 Commonwealth Games, winning the silver medal in the men's light middleweight event. He also competed at the 2024 Summer Olympics in the men's 71 kg event, but was defeated in the round-of-16 by Marco Verde.
