= Battömöriin Misheelt =

Mongolian boxer

Personal information
- Nationality: Mongolia

Boxing career
Medal record
Men's amateur boxing
Representing Mongolia
IBA World Championships
Bronze medal – third place	2023 Tashkent	Welterweight
World Cup
Gold medal – first place	2024 Ulaanbaatar	Welterweight
Asian Championships
Bronze medal – third place	2021 Dubai	Welterweight

Battömöriin Misheelt (Mongolian: Баттөмөрийн Мишээлт) is a Mongolian boxer. He competed at the 2023 IBA Men's World Boxing Championships, winning the bronze medal in the welterweight event.
