= Ayşen Taşkın =

Turkish women's boxer (born 1996)

Personal information
- Nationality: Turkish
- Born: 16 December 1996 (age 29) Gebze, Kocaeli, Turkey
- Weight: 54 kg (119 lb)

Boxing career
Medal record
Women's amateur boxing
Representing Turkey
Islamic Solidarity Games
Gold medal – first place	2025 Riyadh	54 kg

Ayşen Taşkın (born 16 December 1996) is a Turkish female boxer who competes in the bantamweight (54 kg) division. She works as a sports coach.

== Sport career ==
Taşkın started her boxing career at age 13 after getting impressed from boxing matches she watches in the television. She took a break from sports between 2017 and 2021 due to her injury and university education. In 2023, she became Turkish champion in the 57 kg event, and was admitted to the national team camp. She has four Turkish champion titles in different age categories. She is a member of Kocaeli BB Kağıt S.K..

In addition to competing in boxing, she also works as a boxing coach. She prepares around 25 children in boxing for the Youth and Sports Directorate of Kocaeli Province.

At the 2023 European Games in Nowy Targ, Poland, she lost the round of 16 in the featherweight event.

She competed in the 54 kg event at the 2025 Solidary Games in Riyadh, Saudi Arabia, and won the gold medal.

== Personal life ==
A native of Gebze in Kocaeli, Ayşen Taşkın was born on 16 December 1996.

She graduated from the Faculty of Sports science at the Kocaeli University in 2019.
