= Yurii Zakharieiev =

Ukrainian boxer

Personal information
- Nationality: Ukraine

Boxing career
Medal record
Men's amateur boxing
Representing Ukraine
IBA World Championships
| Gold medal – first place | 2021 Belgrade | Light-middleweight |
European Championships
| Bronze medal – third place | 2022 Yerevan | Light middleweight |
European U22 Championships
| Gold medal – first place | 2022 Poreč | Light middleweight |
| Gold medal – first place | 2024 Sofia | Light Middleweight |

Yurii Zakharieiev is a Ukrainian boxer. In 2021, he became the first person to win both the Youth and Elite World Championships in the same year, and is the youngest Ukrainian to have won an amateur world championship.

Zakharieiev won a bronze medal at the 2022 European Amateur Boxing Championships in Yerevan though the result of his semifinal bout against Harris Akbar from England caused a controversy. Ukrainian training staff did not agree with the result by which Akbar was announced by 3-2 as the winner and they protested against that decision. As claimed by the vice-president of the Boxing Federation of Ukraine, the bout was reviewed by an independent board and Zakharieiev was admitted to be the actual winner and some judges were removed indefinitely from the sport of boxing but this decision would have no effect on the tournament results.
