= José Rodríguez Tenorio =

Ecuadorian boxer

Personal information
- Nationality: Ecuador
- Born: 4 June 1997 (age 29)

Boxing career
Medal record
Men's amateur boxing
Representing Ecuador
Pan American Games
Silver medal – second place	2023 Santiago	71 kg

José Rodríguez Tenorio (born 4 June 1997) is an Ecuadorian boxer. He competed at the 2023 Pan American Games, winning the silver medal in the men's 71 kg event.
