= Nishant Dev =

Indian professional boxer (born 2000)

Personal information
- Nickname: DEVastator
- Born: 23 December 2000 (age 25) Karnal, Haryana, India
- Height: 6 ft 1 in (185 cm)
- Weight: Middleweight

Boxing career
- Stance: Southpaw

Boxing record
- Total fights: 8
- Wins: 8
- Win by KO: 6
Medal record
Men's amateur boxing
Representing India
World Championships
Bronze medal – third place	2023 Tashkent	Light middleweight

Nishant Dev (born 23 December 2000) is an Indian professional boxer. As an amateur, he won the bronze medal in the light middleweight division at the 2023 World Boxing Championships in Tashkent, Uzbekistan.

== Early life ==
Dev took up boxing in 2012, inspired by his uncle, who was a professional boxer. He used to train under coach Surendra Chauhan at the Karan Stadium. His father used to wake him up at 4am and accompany him to training to ensure his son was trained well.

== Olympic career ==
Nishant Dev Competed at the 2024 Olympics in the men's 71 kg category after qualifying by virtue of the 2024 World Boxing Olympic Qualification Tournament 2. He won the first round against Ecuadorian Boxer José Rodríguez Tenorio by split decision 3–2, before losing controversially in the quarter finals against Mexican Boxer Marco Verde, denying him a medal.

== Professional career ==
On 11 January 2025, it was reported that Dev had turned professional and signed a promotional contract with Eddie Hearn's UK based Matchroom Boxing. One of the reasons for Hearn signing Dev was to expand on his territory, previously promoting events in USA, Australia, Italy, Spain and Middle East. Announcing the signing via his social media, Hearn said, “Boom! This could be a game-changer. Welcome to the team Amateur standout and 2024 Olympian Nishant Dev.” Dev was to be managed by Ireland's Brian Peters, who also manages the likes of Katie Taylor and Raymond Ford, amongst others. Dev's goal was to become India's first boxing superstar and first world champion. It was also reported that Dev would train in Las Vegas with former boxer Ronald Simms. On signing, Dev said, “I'm very excited to be joining Matchroom and beginning my professional career in Las Vegas on January 25. My goal is to become India's first-ever world professional boxing champion, and I know I have a whole nation behind me to help me achieve this. I know I have the right team behind me and the biggest promoter in the world to ensure that I reach the very top in the sport. I enjoyed my time as an amateur boxer and competed at the very highest level in the Olympics and [won] a World Championship medal, but now I'm ready for this new chapter in my career. The journey to the world championship starts in Las Vegas on January 25.” His debut was scheduled for the undercard of Steve Nelson vs. Diego Pacheco at The Cosmopolitan in Las Vegas.

Dev won his debut fight against Alton Wiggins, stopping him after 2 minutes and 48 seconds of the first round. Dev dropped Wiggins twice during the round. Dev had his second professional bout on 14 June at the MSG Theater in New York defeating Mexican Josue Silva via unanimous decision over 6 rounds. All three judges scored the bout 60-54 for Dev. There was small difficulty at the start when Silva landed to hard shots, but Dev soon took over and dominated the fight. His third fight was scheduled to take place July 19 at the Ford Center in Frisco, Texas against LaQuan Evans. There was no knockdowns, however referee Lawrence Cole felt Evans had taken too much punishment and stopped the fight at 1 minute, 58 seconds of the sixth round, giving Dev a stoppage win. On 1 November, he improved his professional record to 4–0 after defeating Mexican Juan Carlos Medina via unanimous decision over 6 rounds at Caribe Royale Orlando in Orlando, Florida. All three judges’ had the same 60-54 scorecards. He was scheduled to close out the year on the undercard of Matchroom's event in Ghana on 20 December 2025. Dev fought Tanzanian boxer Ally Mbukwa in a six-round bout. Dev won via fourth-road knockout. It was his first professional fight outside the US. His next fight was announced to take place on the Jarrell Miller vs. Lenier Pero undercard, on 25 April 2026 at the Fontainebleau Las Vegas in Nevada. It was Dev's first scheduled 8 round fight. It only took Dev two rounds to defeat Juan Carlos Guerra Jr. via TKO. His next fight was scheduled to take place in Jeddah, on the Anthony Joshua vs. Kristian Prenga undercard on 25 July 2026. Dev put in a dominant performance, knocking out Peruvian boxer Cesar Diaz in the first round, after 2 minutes and 56 seconds. Dev knocked Diaz down three times in total, with the final knockdown coming from a left uppercut that left Diaz unable to continue. His next fight took place on 14 November at the Dignity Health Sports Park in Carson, California. Dev dropped veteran boxer Sona “Slink Proper” Akale (10–5, 5 KOs) in the third round, and then proceeded to stop him in the same round, securing a TKO win.

== Professional boxing record ==
8 fights	8 wins	0 losses
By knockout	6	0
By decision	2	0

No.	Result	Record	Opponent	Type	Round, time	Date	Location	Notes
8	Win	8-0	Sona Akale	TKO	3 (8), 2:52	14 Nov 2026	Dignity Health Sports Park, Carson, California, U.S.	
7	Win	7–0	Cesar Diaz	TKO	1 (8), 2:57	25 Jul 2026	Jeddah Superdome, Jeddah, Saudi Arabia	
6	Win	6–0	Juan Carlos Guerra Jr.	TKO	2 (8), 2:57	25 Apr 2026	Fontainebleau Las Vegas, Winchester, Nevada, U.S.	
5	Win	5–0	Ally Mbukwa	TKO	4 (6), 1:38	20 Dec 2025	Legon Sports Stadium Accra, Ghana	
4	Win	4–0	Juan Carlos Campos Medina	UD	6	1 Nov 2025	Caribe Royale Orlando, Orlando, Florida, U.S.	
3	Win	3–0	LaQuan Evans	TKO	6 (6), 1:58	19 Jul 2025	Ford Center at the Star, Frisco, Texas, U.S.	
2	Win	2–0	Josue Silva	UD	6	14 Jun 2025	Madison Square Garden Theater, New York City, New York, U.S.	
1	Win	1–0	Alton Wiggins	TKO	1 (6), 2:48	25 Jan 2025	Chelsea Ballroom, Paradise, Nevada, U.S.	
