= Aslanbek Shymbergenov =

Kazakhstani boxer (born 1993)

Personal information
- Born: 9 October 1993 (age 32) Taraz, Kazakhstan
- Height: 182 cm (6 ft 0 in)

Sport
- Country: Kazakhstan
- Sport: Boxing
Medal record
Men's boxing
Representing Kazakhstan
IBA World Championships
Gold medal – first place	2023 Tashkent	Light middleweight
Asian Games
Silver medal – second place	2018 Jakarta	69 kg
Bronze medal – third place	2022 Hangzhou	71 kg
Asian Championships
Gold medal – first place	2022 Amman	Light middleweight
Military World Games
Gold medal – first place	2019 Wuhan	69 kg

Aslanbek Shymbergenov (born 9 October 1993) is a Kazakh boxer. He won the gold medal in the light middleweight event at the 2023 IBA World Boxing Championships held in Tashkent, Uzbekistan. He won the silver medal in the men's 69 kg event at the 2018 Asian Games held in Indonesia.

In 2019, at the Military World Games held in Wuhan, China, he won the gold medal in the men's 69 kg event.

Shymbergenov competed in the men's 71 kg event at the 2024 Summer Olympics held in Paris, France. He was eliminated in his first match.
