= Baýramdurdy Nurmuhammedow =

Turkmen boxer

Personal information
- Nationality: Turkmenistan
- Born: 2001 or 2002 (age 24–25)

Boxing career
Medal record
Men's amateur boxing
Representing Turkmenistan
IBA World Championships
Bronze medal – third place	2025 Dubai	Light middleweight
Asian Games
Bronze medal – third place	2022 Hangzhou	71 kg

Baýramdurdy Nurmuhammedow (born 2001/2002) is a Turkmen boxer. He competed at the 2025 IBA Men's World Boxing Championships, winning the bronze medal in the light middleweight event.
