= Alban Beqiri =

Albanian boxer (born 1994)

Personal information
- Nationality: Albania
- Born: 28 June 1994 (age 32)

Boxing career
- Stance
- Military career
- Allegiance: Albania
- Branch: Albanian Armed Forces
- Service years: 2023–present
- Rank: Colonel
Medal record
Men's amateur boxing
Representing Albania
IBA World Championships
Bronze medal – third place	2021 Belgrade	Light middleweight
EUBC Balkan Boxing Championships
Gold medal – first place	2021 Zagreb	Light middleweight
Gold medal – first place	2024 Loznica	Light middleweight

Alban Beqiri (born 28 June 1994) is an Albanian boxer. He competed at the 2021 AIBA World Boxing Championships, winning the bronze medal in the light middleweight event.
