= Makan Traoré (boxer) =

French boxer (born 2000)

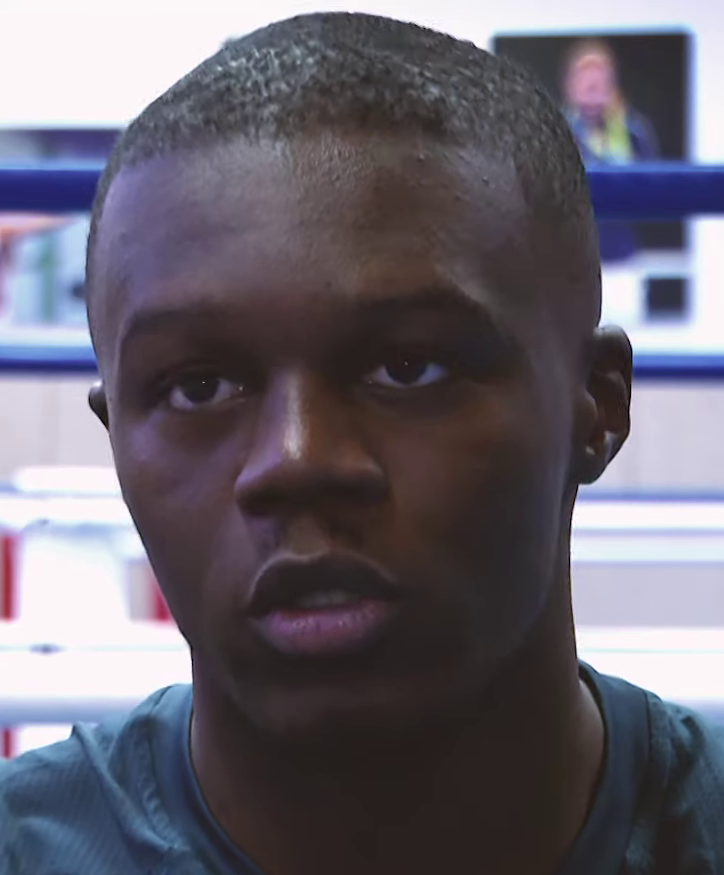
- Traoré in 2024

Personal information
- Nationality: France
- Born: 8 October 2000 (age 26) Montfermeil, France

Boxing career
Medal record
Men's amateur boxing
Representing France
European Games
Bronze medal – third place	2023 Kraków	Light middleweight
European Boxing Championships
Bronze medal – third place	2026 Sofia	70 kg

Makan Traoré (born 8 October 2000) is a French boxer. He competed at the 2023 European Games, winning the bronze medal in the men's light middleweight. He also competed at the 2024 Summer Olympics in the men's 71 kg event, but was defeated in the round-of-16 by Nikolai Terteryan.
