= Kan Chia-wei =

Taiwanese boxer (born 1998)

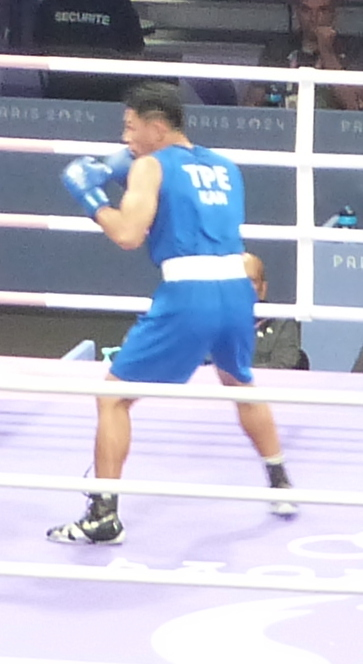
- Chia-wei against Omari Jones in 2024

Personal information
- Born: 10 January 1998 (age 28) Xinyi, Nantou, Taiwan
- Height: 5 ft 9 in (175 cm)

Sport
- Sport: Boxing
- Weight class: Welterweight, Light-middleweight
Medal record
Men's amateur boxing
Representing Chinese Taipei
Asian Games
Silver medal – second place	2022 Hangzhou	71 kg

Kan Chia-wei (Chinese: 甘家葳; born 10 January 1998) is a Taiwanese boxer. He won the silver medal in the 71kg division at the delayed 2022 Asian Games after being unable to take part in the final due to a facial injury sustained in his semi-final bout. Kan represented his country at the 2024 Summer Olympics, losing in the 71kg category round-of-16 to eventual bronze medalist Omari Jones from the United States.
