= Sarkhan Aliyev =

Azerbaijani boxer (born 1998)

Personal information
- Nationality: Azerbaijan
- Born: 27 August 1998 (age 28)

Boxing career
Medal record
Men's amateur boxing
Representing Azerbaijan
IBA World Championships
Bronze medal – third place	2021 Belgrade	Light middleweight
Islamic Solidarity Games
Bronze medal – third place	2025 Riyadh	70 kg

Sarkhan Aliyev (born 27 August 1998) is an Azerbaijani boxer. He competed at the 2021 AIBA World Boxing Championships, winning the bronze medal in the light middleweight event.

In September 2026, at the "Belt and Road" international tournament among adults and juniors (U-19) in China, Sarkhan Aliyev (70 kg) took second place.
