= Vahid Abasov =

Serbian boxer (born 1997)

Personal information
- Nationality: Serbia; Russia
- Born: Vakhid Abbasov; 6 June 1997 (age 29) Stavropolsky District, Russia
- Height: 5 ft 8.5 in (1.74 m)
- Weight: 148 lb (67 kg)

Sport
- Country: Serbia
- Sport: Boxing
- Weight class: Welterweight
Medal record
Men's amateur boxing
Representing Serbia
European Games
Silver medal – second place	2023 Kraków	Light middleweight
European Championships
Gold medal – first place	2022 Yerevan	Welterweight
Bronze medal – third place	2024 Belgrade	Welterweight

Vahid Abbasov (Serbian Cyrillic: Вахид Аббасов, Russian: Вахид Вагиф оглы Аббасов; born 6 June 1997) is a Russian-born Serbian boxer. He competed at the 2022 European Amateur Boxing Championships, winning the gold medal in the welterweight event.
