= Zeyad Ishaish =

Jordanian boxer (born 1998)

Zeyad Eashash
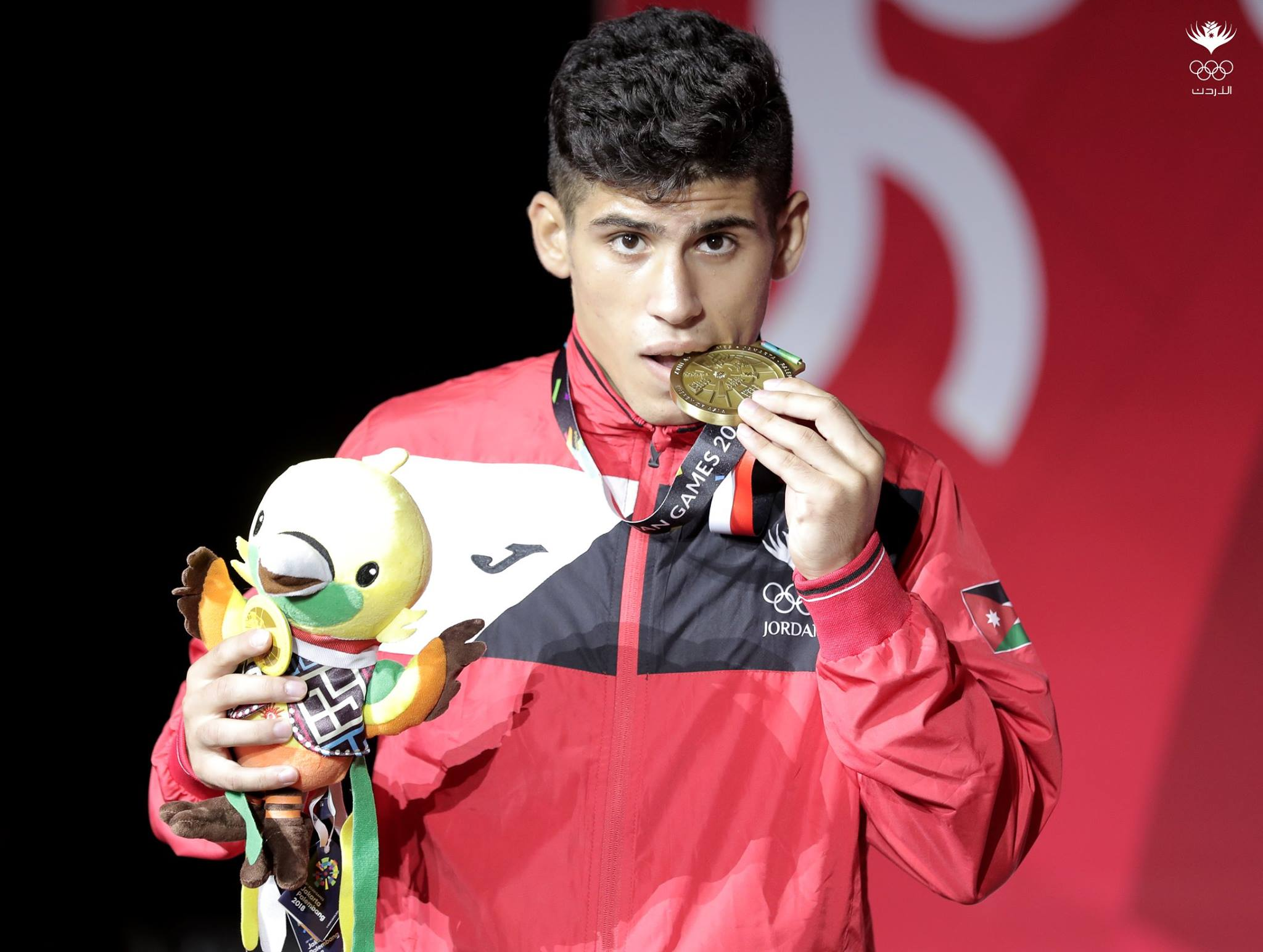
- Zeyad Eashash in 2018

Personal information
- Nationality: Jordanian
- Born: 23 October 1998 (age 28) Amman, Jordan

Sport
- Sport: Boxing
- Coached by: Dagoberto Rojas Scott
Medal record
Men's amateur boxing
Representing Jordan
World Championships
Bronze medal – third place	2025 Liverpool	70 kg
Asian Games
Bronze medal – third place	2018 Jakarta–Palembang	Welterweight
Asian Championships
Silver medal – second place	2022 Amman	Light middleweight
Islamic Solidarity Games
Gold medal – first place	2025 Riyadh	70 kg

Zeyad Eashash (Arabic: زياد عشيش; born 23 October 1998) is a Jordanian amateur boxer who won silver at the 2022 Asian Amateur Boxing Championships. He represented Jordan at the delayed 2020 Summer Olympics in Tokyo and the 2024 Summer Olympics in Paris.

== Personal life ==
His brother, Hussein, is also a boxer.
