= Boxing at the 2024 Summer Olympics – Qualification =

This article details the qualifying phase for boxing at the 2024 Summer Olympics. The competition at these Games comprised a total of 248 boxers from the different National Olympic Committees (NOCs), about 40 fewer overall than those at Tokyo 2020. Each NOC could only send a single boxer in each of the thirteen weight categories (seven for men and six for women).

In June 2022, the International Olympic Committee (IOC) barred the International Boxing Association's (IBA) rights to run and organize the tournament due to "continuing irregularity issues in the areas of finance, governance, ethics, refereeing, and judging". Hence, the IOC executive board established and ratified a new qualification system for Paris 2024 that would witness the boxers obtain the quota spots through the continental multisport events, reducing the complexity of the process.

The qualification period commences at five regional multisport events in the middle of the 2023 season (African Qualification Tournament in Dakar, Senegal; Asian Games in Hangzhou, China; European Games in Kraków, Poland; Pacific Games in Honiara, Solomon Islands; and the Pan American Games in Santiago, Chile), set to be served as continental qualifying meets, where a total of 139 spots will be assigned to a specific number of highest-ranked boxers in each weight category. Following the continental phase, the remainder of the total quota will be decided in two world qualification tournaments organized by the IOC in the initial half of the 2024 season, offering another batch of spots available to the highest-ranked eligible boxers in each weight division.

The host nation France reserves a maximum of six automatic quota places to be equally distributed between men and women in their respective weight categories, while nine places (four for men and five for women) will be entitled to eligible NOCs interested to have their boxers compete in Paris 2024 as abided by the Universality principle. Because France obtained a total of seven quota places (three male and four female) at the 2023 European Games, the unused host places would thereby be redistributed to the next highest-ranked boxers in their respective weight divisions at the second World Qualification Tournament.

== Timeline ==
Event	Date	Venue
2023 European Games	June 23 – July 2, 2023	(Poland) Nowy Targ
2023 African Qualification Tournament	September 9–15, 2023	(Senegal) Dakar
2022 Asian Games	September 24 – October 5, 2023	(China) Hangzhou
2023 Pan American Games	October 19–27, 2023	(Chile) Santiago
2023 Pacific Games	November 28 – December 2, 2023	(Solomon Islands) Honiara
2024 World Qualification Tournament 1	March 3–11, 2024	(Italy) Busto Arsizio
2024 World Qualification Tournament 2	May 24 – June 2, 2024	(Thailand) Bangkok

== Qualification summary ==
NOC	Men							Women						Total
NOC	51	57	63.5	71	80	92	+92	50	54	57	60	66	75	Total
Algeria			Yes				Yes	Yes			Yes	Yes		5
Armenia							Yes							1
Australia	Yes	Yes	Yes	Yes	Yes		Yes	Yes	Yes	Yes	Yes	Yes	Yes	12
Azerbaijan	Yes		Yes		Yes	Yes	Yes							5
Belgium		Yes				Yes						Yes		3
Brazil	Yes	Yes			Yes	Yes	Yes	Yes	Yes	Yes	Yes	Yes		10
Bulgaria		Yes	Yes	Yes					Yes	Yes				5
Canada			Yes										Yes	2
Cape Verde	Yes											Yes		2
China					Yes	Yes		Yes	Yes	Yes	Yes	Yes	Yes	8
Colombia		Yes						Yes	Yes	Yes	Yes			5
Croatia					Yes									1
Cuba	Yes	Yes	Yes		Yes	Yes								5
Democratic Republic of the Congo										Yes		Yes		2
Denmark				Yes										1
Dominican Republic	Yes				Yes							Yes		3
Ecuador				Yes			Yes				Yes			3
Egypt				Yes	Yes				Yes					3
Finland								Yes						1
France	Yes		Yes	Yes			Yes	Yes		Yes	Yes		Yes	8
Georgia			Yes			Yes								2
Germany							Yes	Yes						2
Great Britain				Yes		Yes	Yes		Yes			Yes	Yes	6
Haiti					Yes									1
Hungary			Yes		Yes							Yes		3
India	Yes			Yes				Yes	Yes	Yes			Yes	6
Ireland		Yes	Yes	Yes		Yes		Yes	Yes	Yes	Yes	Yes	Yes	10
Italy					Yes	Yes	Yes	Yes	Yes	Yes	Yes	Yes		8
Japan		Yes		Yes										2
Jordan			Yes	Yes	Yes									3
Kazakhstan	Yes	Yes	Yes	Yes	Yes	Yes	Yes	Yes		Yes			Yes	10
Kosovo											Yes			1
Kyrgyzstan		Yes												1
Mali										Yes				1
Mexico			Yes	Yes				Yes					Yes	4
Mongolia								Yes	Yes					2
Montenegro									Yes					1
Morocco								Yes	Yes				Yes	3
Mozambique				Yes								Yes		2
Netherlands											Yes			1
Nigeria		Yes				Yes					Yes			3
North Korea									Yes		Yes			2
Norway							Yes						Yes	2
Palestine		Yes												1
Panama													Yes	1
Philippines		Yes			Yes			Yes		Yes			Yes	5
Poland				Yes		Yes				Yes		Yes	Yes	5
Puerto Rico	Yes									Yes				2
Refugee Olympic Team	Yes												Yes	2
Romania									Yes					1
Samoa						Yes								1
Serbia				Yes					Yes		Yes			3
Slovakia												Yes		1
Solomon Islands			Yes											1
South Korea									Yes		Yes			2
Spain	Yes	Yes	Yes			Yes	Yes	Yes						6
Sweden		Yes									Yes			2
Chinese Taipei			Yes	Yes					Yes	Yes	Yes	Yes		6
Tajikistan			Yes			Yes				Yes				3
Thailand	Yes		Yes		Yes			Yes	Yes		Yes	Yes	Yes	8
Tonga											Yes			1
Tunisia										Yes				1
Turkey	Yes			Yes	Yes			Yes	Yes	Yes	Yes	Yes		8
Ukraine		Yes			Yes		Yes							3
United States	Yes	Yes		Yes			Yes	Yes		Yes	Yes	Yes		8
Uzbekistan	Yes	Yes	Yes	Yes	Yes	Yes	Yes	Yes	Yes	Yes		Yes		11
Venezuela			Yes							Yes				2
Vietnam									Yes		Yes			2
Zambia	Yes							Yes						2
Total: 68 NOCs	17	18	20	20	18	16	16	22	22	22	22	20	16	248

== Men's events ==
Weight	Continental Qualifier					WQT1	WQT2	Host	UNI	Total
Weight	AF	AM	AS	EU	OC	WQT1	WQT2	Host	UNI	Total
51 kg	1	2	2	2	1	4	4	0	0	16
57 kg	1	2	2	4	1	4	3	0	1	18
63.5 kg	1	2	2	4	1	4	5	0	1	20
71 kg	1	2	2	4	1	4	5	0	1	20
80 kg	1	2	2	4	1	4	3	0	1	18
92 kg	1	2	2	2	1	4	4	0	0	16
+92 kg	1	2	2	2	1	4	4	0	0	16
Total	7	14	14	22	7	28	28	0	4	124

=== 51 kg ===
Competition	Places	Qualified boxer
2023 European Games	2	Billal Bennama (FRA); Samet Gümüş (TUR)
2023 African Qualification Tournament	1	Patrick Chinyemba (ZAM)
2022 Asian Games	2	Thitisan Panmot (THA); Hasanboy Dusmatov (UZB)
2023 Pan American Games	2	Junior Alcántara (DOM); Michael Trindade (BRA)
2023 Pacific Games	1	Yusuf Chothia (AUS)
2024 World Qualification Tournament 1	4	Alejandro Claro (CUB); Nijat Huseynov (AZE); Juanma López De Jesus (PUR); Saken Bibossinov (KAZ)
2024 World Qualification Tournament 2	4	Rafael Lozano Serrano (ESP); Roscoe Hill (USA); Daniel Varela de Pina (CPV); Amit Panghal (IND)
Invitational Place	1	Omid Ahmadisafa (EOR)
Total	17	

=== 57 kg ===
Competition	Places	Qualified boxer
Host country	0	—
2023 European Games	4	Javier Ibáñez (BUL); Nebil Ibrahim (SWE); Vasile Usturoi (BEL); José Quiles (ESP)
2023 African Qualification Tournament	1	Dolapo Omole (NGR)
2022 Asian Games	2	Abdumalik Khalokov (UZB); Shudai Harada (JPN)
2023 Pan American Games	2	Jahmal Harvey (USA); Saidel Horta (CUB)
2023 Pacific Games	1	Charlie Senior (AUS)
2024 World Qualification Tournament 1	4	Makhmud Sabyrkhan (KAZ); Yilmar González (COL); Jude Gallagher (IRL); Luiz Oliveira (BRA)
2024 World Qualification Tournament 2	3	Aider Abduraimov (UKR); Carlo Paalam (PHI); Munarbek Seiitbek Uulu (KGZ)
Universality place	1	Wasim Abusal (PLE)
Total	18	

=== 63.5 kg ===
Competition	Places	Qualified boxer
Host country	0	—
2023 European Games	4	Dean Clancy (IRL); Sofiane Oumiha (FRA); Lasha Guruli (GEO); Richárd Kovács (HUN)
2023 African Qualification Tournament	1	Jugurtha Ait Bekka (ALG)
2022 Asian Games	2	~~Baatarsükhiin Chinzorig (MGL)~~ (Note: Asian Games gold medalist Chinzorig Baatarsukh (MGL) was tested positive for Metandienone during an in-competition test, the quota was reallocated to Bunjong Sinsiri (THA).); Lai Chu-en (TPE); Bunjong Sinsiri (THA)
2023 Pan American Games	2	Wyatt Sanford (CAN); Miguel Ángel Ramírez (MEX)
2023 Pacific Games	1	Harry Garside (AUS)
2024 World Qualification Tournament 1	4	Jesús Cova (VEN); Obada Al-Kasbeh (JOR); Ruslan Abdullaev (UZB); Bakhodur Usmonov (TJK)
2024 World Qualification Tournament 2	5	Radoslav Rosenov (BUL); Oier Ibarreche (ESP); Erislandy Álvarez (CUB); Malik Hasanov (AZE); Bazarbay Mukhammedsabyr (KAZ)
Universality place	1	~~Pemberton Lele (SOL)~~; John Ume (PNG)
Total	20	

=== 71 kg ===
Competition	Places	Qualified boxer
Host country	0	—
2023 European Games	4	Makan Traoré (FRA); Nikolai Terteryan (DEN); Tuğrulhan Erdemir (TUR); Vahid Abasov (SRB)
2023 African Qualification Tournament	1	Omar Elawady (EGY)
2022 Asian Games	2	Kan Chia-wei (TPE); Sewon Okazawa (JPN)
2023 Pan American Games	2	Marco Verde (MEX); José Rodríguez Tenorio (ECU)
2023 Pacific Games	1	Shannan Davey (AUS)
2024 World Qualification Tournament 1	4	Rami Mofid Kiwan (BUL); Asadkhuja Muydinkhujaev (UZB); Aslanbek Shymbergenov (KAZ); Omari Jones (USA)
2024 World Qualification Tournament 2	5	Nishant Dev (IND); Lewis Richardson (GBR); Zeyad Ishaish (JOR); Damian Durkacz (POL); Aidan Walsh (IRL)
Universality place	1	Tiago Muxanga (MOZ)
Total	20	

=== 80 kg ===
Competition	Places	Qualified boxer
Host country	0	—
2023 European Games	4	Salvatore Cavallaro (ITA); Oleksandr Khyzhniak (UKR); Gabrijel Veočić (CRO); Murad Allahverdiyev (AZE)
2023 African Qualification Tournament	1	Abdelrahman Oraby (EGY)
2022 Asian Games	2	Toqtarbek Tanatqan (CHN); Eumir Marcial (PHI)
2023 Pan American Games	2	Arlen López (CUB); Wanderley Pereira (BRA)
2023 Pacific Games	1	Callum Peters (AUS)
2024 World Qualification Tournament 1	4	Nurbek Oralbay (KAZ); Kaan Aykutsun (TUR); Turabek Khabibullaev (UZB); Pylyp Akilov (HUN)
2024 World Qualification Tournament 2	3	Cristian Pinales (DOM); Weerapon Jongjoho (THA); Hussein Ishaish (JOR)
Universality place	1	Cedrick Belony (HAI)
Total	18	

=== 92 kg ===
Competition	Places	Qualified boxer
2023 European Games	2	Jack Marley (IRL); Aziz Abbes Mouhiidine (ITA)
2023 African Qualification Tournament	1	Olaitan Olaore (NGR)
2022 Asian Games	2	Han Xuezhen (CHN); Davlat Boltaev (TJK)
2023 Pan American Games	2	Keno Machado (BRA); Julio César La Cruz (CUB)
2023 Pacific Games	1	Ato Plodzicki-Faoagali (SAM)
2024 World Qualification Tournament 1	4	Lazizbek Mullojonov (UZB); Enmanuel Reyes (ESP); Aibek Oralbay (KAZ); Patrick Brown (GBR)
2024 World Qualification Tournament 2	4	Victor Schelstraete (BEL); Mateusz Bereźnicki (POL); Loren Alfonso (AZE); Georgii Kushitashvili (GEO)
Total	16	

=== +92 kg ===
Competition	Places	Qualified boxer
2023 European Games	2	Mahammad Abdullayev (AZE); Delicious Orie (GBR)
2023 African Qualification Tournament	1	Mourad Kadi (ALG)
2022 Asian Games	2	Kamshybek Kunkabayev (KAZ); Bakhodir Jalolov (UZB)
2023 Pan American Games	2	Abner Teixeira (BRA); Joshua Edwards (USA)
2023 Pacific Games	1	Teremoana Junior (AUS)
2024 World Qualification Tournament 1	4	Diego Lenzi (ITA); Nelvie Tiafack (GER); Omar Shiha (NOR); Djamili-Dini Aboudou Moindze (FRA)
2024 World Qualification Tournament 2	4	Gerlon Congo (ECU); Davit Chaloyan (ARM); Ayoub Ghadfa (ESP); Dmytro Lovchynskyi (UKR)
Total	16	

== Women's events ==
Weight	Continental Qualifier					WQT1	WQT2	Host	UNI	Total
Weight	AF	AM	AS	EU	OC	WQT1	WQT2	Host	UNI	Total
50 kg	2	2	4	4	1	4	4	0	1	22
54 kg	2	2	4	4	1	4	4	0	1	22
57 kg	2	4	4	4	1	2	4	0	1	22
60 kg	2	4	4	4	1	3	3	0	1	22
66 kg	2	2	2	4	1	4	4	0	1	20
75 kg	1	2	2	2	1	4	4	0	0	16
Total	11	16	20	22	6	21	23	0	5	124

=== 50 kg ===
Competition	Places	Qualified boxer
Host country	0	—
2023 European Games	4	Buse Naz Çakıroğlu (TUR); Giordana Sorrentino (ITA); Laura Fuertes (ESP); Wassila Lkhadiri (FRA)
2023 African Qualification Tournament	2	Roumaysa Boualam (ALG); Yasmine Moutaqui (MAR)
2022 Asian Games	4	Oyuntsetsegiin Yesügen (MGL); Wu Yu (CHN); Chuthamat Raksat (THA); Nikhat Zareen (IND)
2023 Pan American Games	2	Caroline de Almeida (BRA); Jennifer Lozano (USA)
2023 Pacific Games	1	Monique Suraci (AUS)
2024 World Qualification Tournament 1	4	Maxi Klötzer (GER); Sabina Bobokulova (UZB); Aira Villegas (PHI); Ingrit Valencia (COL)
2024 World Qualification Tournament 2	4	Nazym Kyzaibay (KAZ); Daina Moorehouse (IRL); Pihla Kaivo-oja (FIN); Fátima Herrera (MEX)
Universality place	1	Margret Tembo (ZAM)
Total	22	

=== 54 kg ===
Competition	Places	Qualified boxer
Host country	0	—
2023 European Games	4	Charley Davison (GBR); Stanimira Petrova (BUL); Lăcrămioara Perijoc (ROU); Hatice Akbaş (TUR)
2023 African Qualification Tournament	2	Widad Bertal (MAR); Yomna Ayyad (EGY)
2022 Asian Games	4	Preeti Pawar (IND); Chang Yuan (CHN); Pang Chol-mi (PRK); Nigina Uktamova (UZB)
2023 Pan American Games	2	Yeni Arias (COL); Tatiana Chagas (BRA)
2023 Pacific Games	1	Tiana Echegaray (AUS)
2024 World Qualification Tournament 1	4	Sara Ćirković (SRB); Jutamas Jitpong (THA); Sirine Charaabi (ITA); Võ Thị Kim Ánh (VIE)
2024 World Qualification Tournament 2	4	Möngöntsetsegiin Enkhjargal (MGL); Huang Hsiao-wen (TPE); Jennifer Lehane (IRL); Im Ae-ji (KOR)
Universality place	1	Bojana Gojković (MNE)
Total	22	

=== 57 kg ===
Competition	Places	Qualified boxer
Host country	0	—
2023 European Games	4	Svetlana Staneva (BUL); Irma Testa (ITA); Michaela Walsh (IRL); Amina Zidani (FRA)
2023 African Qualification Tournament	2	Khouloud Hlimi (TUN); Marcelat Sakobi Matshu (COD)
2022 Asian Games	4	Lin Yu-ting (TPE); Karina Ibragimova (KAZ); Mijgona Samadova (TJK); ~~Parveen Hooda (IND)~~ (Note: Indian boxer Parveen Hooda was sanctioned by ITA for three whereabouts failures, her results at the 2022 Asian Games was disqualified, the quota was reallocated to Sitora Turdibekova(UZB)); Sitora Turdibekova (UZB)
2023 Pan American Games	4	Valeria Arboleda (COL); Ashleyann Lozada (PUR); Jucielen Romeu (BRA); Omailyn Alcalá (VEN)
2023 Pacific Games	1	Tina Rahimi (AUS)
2024 World Qualification Tournament 1	2	Nesthy Petecio (PHI); Julia Szeremeta (POL)
2024 World Qualification Tournament 2	4	Alyssa Mendoza (USA); Xu Zichun (CHN); Jaismine Lamboria (IND); Esra Yıldız (TUR)
Universality place	1	Marine Camara (MLI)
Total	22	

=== 60 kg ===
Competition	Places	Qualified boxer
Host country	0	—
2023 European Games	4	Kellie Harrington (IRL); Estelle Mossely (FRA); Gizem Özer (TUR); Natalia Šadrina (SRB)
2023 African Qualification Tournament	2	Hadjila Khelif (ALG); Cynthia Ogunsemilore (NGR)
2022 Asian Games	4	Thananya Somnuek (THA); Won Un-gyong (PRK); Wu Shih-yi (TPE); Yang Wenlu (CHN)
2023 Pan American Games	4	Angie Valdés (COL); María José Palacios (ECU); Jajaira Gonzalez (USA); Beatriz Ferreira (BRA)
2023 Pacific Games	1	Tyla McDonald (AUS)
2024 World Qualification Tournament 1	3	Chelsey Heijnen (NED); Donjeta Sadiku (KOS); Alessia Mesiano (ITA)
2024 World Qualification Tournament 2	3	Agnes Alexiusson (SWE); Oh Yeon-ji (KOR); Hà Thị Linh (VIE)
Universality place	1	Fe'ofa'aki Epenisa (TGA)
Total	22	

=== 66 kg ===
Competition	Places	Qualified boxer
Host country	0	—
2023 European Games	4	Luca Hámori (HUN); Oshin Derieuw (BEL); Rosie Eccles (GBR); Busenaz Sürmeneli (TUR)
2023 African Qualification Tournament	2	Alcinda Panguana (MOZ); Imane Khelif (ALG)
2022 Asian Games	2	Yang Liu (CHN); Janjaem Suwannapheng (THA)
2023 Pan American Games	2	Morelle McCane (USA); Bárbara Maria dos Santos (BRA)
2023 Pacific Games	1	Marissa Williamson (AUS)
2024 World Qualification Tournament 1	4	María Moronta (DOM); Chen Nien-chin (TPE); Angela Carini (ITA); Aneta Rygielska (POL)
2024 World Qualification Tournament 2	4	Navbakhor Khamidova (UZB); Jessica Triebeľová (SVK); Brigitte Mbabi (COD); Gráinne Walsh (IRL)
Universality place	1	Ivanusa Moreira (CPV)
Total	20	

=== 75 kg ===
Competition	Places	Qualified boxer
2023 European Games	2	Davina Michel (FRA); Aoife O'Rourke (IRL)
2023 African Qualification Tournament	1	Khadija El-Mardi (MAR)
2022 Asian Games	2	Li Qian (CHN); Lovlina Borgohain (IND)
2023 Pan American Games	2	Tammara Thibeault (CAN); Atheyna Bylon (PAN)
2023 Pacific Games	1	Caitlin Parker (AUS)
2024 World Qualification Tournament 1	4	Cindy Ngamba (EOR); Chantelle Reid (GBR); Sunniva Hofstad (NOR); Elżbieta Wójcik (POL)
2024 World Qualification Tournament 2	4	Baison Manikon (THA); Hergie Bacyadan (PHI); Valentina Khalzova (KAZ); Citlalli Ortiz (MEX)
Total	16	
