= 2024 World Boxing Olympic Qualification Tournament 2 =

Boxing competitions

- Venue: Indoor Stadium Huamark
- Location: Bangkok, Thailand
- Dates: 24 May – 2 June
- Competitors: 578 from 132 nations

The 2024 World Boxing Olympic Qualification Tournament 2 for the boxing tournament at the 2024 Summer Olympics in Paris, France was held in Bangkok, Thailand from 24 May to 2 June 2024.

== Quota winners ==
=== Men ===
Event	Quota winners
−51 kg	Rafael Lozano Serrano (ESP); Roscoe Hill (USA); Daniel Varela de Pina (CPV); Amit Panghal (IND)
−57 kg	Aider Abduraimov (UKR); Carlo Paalam (PHI); Munarbek Seiitbek Uulu (KGZ)
−63.5 kg	Radoslav Rosenov (BUL); Oier Ibarreche (ESP); Erislandy Álvarez (CUB); Malik Hasanov (AZE); Mukhammedsabyr Bazarbayuly (KAZ)
−71 kg	Zeyad Ishaish (JOR); Damian Durkacz (POL); Nishant Dev (IND); Lewis Richardson (GBR); Aidan Walsh (IRL)
−80 kg	Cristian Pinales (DOM); Weerapon Jongjoho (THA); Hussein Ishaish (JOR)
−92 kg	Victor Schelstraete (BEL); Mateusz Bereźnicki (POL); Loren Alfonso (AZE); Georgii Kushitashvili (GEO)
+92 kg	Gerlon Congo (ECU); Davit Chaloyan (ARM); Ayoub Ghadfa (ESP); Dmytro Lovchynskyi (UKR)

=== Women ===
Event	Quota winners
−50 kg	Nazym Kyzaibay (KAZ); Daina Moorehouse (IRL); Pihla Kaivo-oja (FIN); Fátima Herrera (MEX)
−54 kg	Möngöntsetsegiin Enkhjargal (MGL); Huang Hsiao-wen (TPE); Jennifer Lehane (IRL); Im Ae-ji (KOR)
−57 kg	Alyssa Mendoza (USA); Xu Zichun (CHN); Jaismine Lamboria (IND); Esra Yıldız (TUR)
−60 kg	Agnes Alexiusson (SWE); Oh Yeon-ji (KOR); Hà Thị Linh (VIE)
−66 kg	Navbakhor Khamidova (UZB); Jessica Triebeľová (SVK); Brigitte Mbabi (COD); Grainne Walsh (IRL)
−75 kg	Baison Manikon (THA); Hergie Bacyadan (PHI); Valentina Khalzova (KAZ); Citlalli Ortiz (MEX)

== Qualification summary ==
NOC	Men							Women						Total
NOC	51	57	63.5	71	80	92	+92	50	54	57	60	66	75	Total
Armenia							Yes							1
Azerbaijan			Yes			Yes								2
Belgium						Yes								1
Bulgaria			Yes											1
Cape Verde	Yes													1
China										Yes				1
Chinese Taipei									Yes					1
Cuba			Yes											1
Democratic Republic of the Congo												Yes		1
Dominican Republic					Yes									1
Ecuador							Yes							1
Finland								Yes						1
Georgia						Yes								1
Great Britain				Yes										1
India	Yes			Yes						Yes				3
Ireland				Yes				Yes	Yes			Yes		4
Jordan				Yes	Yes									2
Kazakhstan			Yes					Yes					Yes	3
Kyrgyzstan		Yes												1
Mexico								Yes					Yes	2
Mongolia									Yes					1
Philippines		Yes											Yes	2
Poland				Yes		Yes								2
Slovakia												Yes		1
South Korea									Yes		Yes			2
Spain	Yes		Yes				Yes							3
Sweden											Yes			1
Thailand					Yes								Yes	2
Turkey										Yes				1
Ukraine		Yes					Yes							2
United States	Yes									Yes				2
Uzbekistan												Yes		1
Vietnam											Yes			1
Total:	4	3	5	5	3	4	4	4	4	4	3	4	4	51

== Men's results ==
=== Flyweight (51 kg) ===
Section 1

Round 1
Luis Delgado (ECU)	4
Federico Serra (ITA)	1
Carlos Suárez (TTO)	DSQ
Mehron Shafiev (TJK)
Rafael Lozano Serrano (ESP)	4
Rogen Ladon (PHI)	1
Tashi Wangdi (BHU)	0
Keymberth González (VEN)	5
David Alaverdian (ISR)	0
So Chon-ryong (PRK)	4

Round 2
Nguyễn Minh Cường (VIE)	2
Luis Delgado (ECU)	3
Mehron Shafiev (TJK)	2
Rafael Lozano Serrano (ESP)	3
Azat Makhmetov (BRN)	0
Keymberth González (VEN)	5
So Chon-ryong (PRK)	5
Franck Mombey (GAB)	0

Round 3
Luis Delgado (ECU)	1
Rafael Lozano Serrano (ESP)	4
Keymberth González (VEN)	2
So Chon-ryong (PRK)	3

Quota bout
Rafael Lozano Serrano (ESP)	5
So Chon-ryong (PRK)	0

Section 2

Round 1
Muhammad Faheem (PAK)	1
Seán Mari (IRL)	4
Abdulaziz Al-Atbi (KSA)	0
Gankhuyag G.-Erdene (MGL)	5
Yuberjen Martínez (COL)	5
Chandra Bahadur Thapa (NEP)	0
Huthaifa Eshish (JOR)	4
Ergyunal Sebahtin (BUL)	1

Round 2
Abdul Qaiyum Ariffin (MAS)	ABD
Seán Mari (IRL)
Gankhuyag G.-Erdene (MGL)	5
Eriu Temakau (KIR)	0
Roscoe Hill (USA)	5
Yuberjen Martínez (COL)	0
Huthaifa Eshish (JOR)	4
Nikolas Pawlik (POL)	1

Round 3
Abdul Qaiyum Ariffin (MAS)	0
Gankhuyag G.-Erdene (MGL)	3
Roscoe Hill (USA)	4
Huthaifa Eshish (JOR)	1

Quota bout
Gankhuyag G.-Erdene (MGL)	0
Roscoe Hill (USA)	5

Section 3

Round 1
Shuail Al-Qarnas (YEM)	0
Salah Omar (GER)	5
Hamza Essaadi (MAR)	RSC
Chand Nehal (FIJ)
Umayanga Godakandalage (SRI)	5
Teo Wei Xuan (SGP)	0
Mohamed Moziane (ALG)	1
Dmytro Zamotayev (UKR)	4
Daniel Varela de Pina (CPV)	KO
Omer Ametović (SRB)

Round 2
Mehdi Parvizi (IRI)	3
Salah Omar (GER)	2
Hamza Essaadi (MAR)	0
Umayanga Godakandalage (SRI)	5
Ramón Quiroga (ARG)	0
Dmytro Zamotayev (UKR)	5
Daniel Varela de Pina (CPV)	5
Kanneth Tam (HKG)	0

Round 3
Mehdi Parvizi (IRI)	KO
Umayanga Godakandalage (SRI)
Dmytro Zamotayev (UKR)	2
Daniel Varela de Pina (CPV)	3

Quota bout
Mehdi Parvizi (IRI)	0
Daniel Varela de Pina (CPV)	5

Section 4

Round 1
Theophilus Allotey (GHA)	5
Attila Bernáth (HUN)	0
Ala Eddine Zidi (TUN)
Baregham Harutyunyan (ARM)	RSC
Kiaran MacDonald (GBR)	2
Kim In-kyu (KOR)	3
Carlos Ramírez (GUA)	KO
Moussa Sahabi Gado (NIG)
Mauricio Ruiz (MEX)	5
Bilal Safari (AFG)	0

Round 2
Anvarzhan Khodzhiev (KGZ)	0
Theophilus Allotey (GHA)	5
Baregham Harutyunyan (ARM)	0
Liu Chuang (CHN)	5
Kim In-kyu (KOR)	4
Carlos Ramírez (GUA)	0
Mauricio Ruiz (MEX)	1
Amit Panghal (IND)	4

Round 3
Theophilus Allotey (GHA)	1
Liu Chuang (CHN)	4
Kim In-kyu (KOR)	0
Amit Panghal (IND)	5

Quota bout
Liu Chuang (CHN)	0
Amit Panghal (IND)	5

=== Featherweight (57 kg) ===
Quota bouts

Quota bouts
Munarbek Seiitbek Uulu (KGZ)	0
Aider Abduraimov (UKR)	5
Sachin Siwach (IND)	0
Carlo Paalam (PHI)	5

Quota bout
Munarbek Seiitbek Uulu (KGZ)	5
Sachin Siwach (IND)	0

Section 1

Round 1
Tso Sing Yu (HKG)	1
Shamil Askerov (AZE)	4
Ani Haxhillari (ALB)	4
Paweł Brach (POL)	1
Márcio Cardoso (POR)	0
Caleb Tirado (PUR)	5
Lucas Fernández (URU)	3
Roland Veres (HUN)	2
Jean Caicedo (ECU)	0
Nguyễn Văn Đương (VIE)	5
Allan Oiake (PNG)	0
Armando Sigauque (MOZ)	5
Munarbek Seiitbek Uulu (KGZ)	5
Michele Baldassi (ITA)	0

Round 2
Rujakran Jantrong (THA)	0
Shamil Askerov (AZE)	3
Ani Haxhillari (ALB)	1
Caleb Tirado (PUR)	4
Lucas Fernández (URU)	4
Nguyễn Văn Đương (VIE)	1
Armando Sigauque (MOZ)	0
Munarbek Seiitbek Uulu (KGZ)	5

Round 3
Shamil Askerov (AZE)	3
Caleb Tirado (PUR)	2
Lucas Fernández (URU)	0
Munarbek Seiitbek Uulu (KGZ)	5

Round 4
Shamil Askerov (AZE)	1
Munarbek Seiitbek Uulu (KGZ)	3

Section 2

Round 1
Yoel Finol (VEN)	0
Aider Abduraimov (UKR)	5
Mwengo Mwale (ZAM)	WO
Davule Jone (FIJ)
Bashkim Bajoku (KOS)	5
Jeroson Garduward (LBR)	0
Asror Vokhidov (TJK)	5
Abdoul Karim Bathily (MLI)	0
Farid Walizadeh (EOR)	WO
Victor Tremblay (CAN)
Yoezer Tashi (BHU)
Denis Bril (GER)	RSC
Danial Shahbakhsh (IRI)	5
Ahmed Al-Koum (LBA)	0
Adrien Davin (BOL)	0
Kharkhüügiin Enkh-Amar (MGL)	5

Round 2
Aider Abduraimov (UKR)	5
Mwengo Mwale (ZAM)	0
Bashkim Bajoku (KOS)	0
Asror Vokhidov (TJK)	5
Farid Walizadeh (EOR)
Denis Bril (GER)	RSC
Danial Shahbakhsh (IRI)	0
Kharkhüügiin Enkh-Amar (MGL)	5

Round 3
Aider Abduraimov (UKR)	5
Asror Vokhidov (TJK)	0
Denis Bril (GER)	4
Kharkhüügiin Enkh-Amar (MGL)	0

Round 4
Aider Abduraimov (UKR)	4
Denis Bril (GER)	0

Section 3

Round 1
Sachin Siwach (IND)	5
Alex Mukuka (NZL)	0
Frederik Jensen (DEN)	5
Miguel Vega (MEX)	0
Mohamad Mehdi Sahak (AFG)	0
Batuhan Ciftci (TUR)	5
José Felipe (GUA)
Keevin Allicock (GUY)	RSC
O Tae-bom (PRK)	4
Tryagain Ndevelo (NAM)	1
Samuel Kistohurry (FRA)	5
George Molwantwa (BOT)	0
Oussama Mordjane (ALG)	RSC
Walter Oupathana (LAO)
Owain Harris-Allan (GBR)	1
Kim Hyung-seung (KOR)	4

Round 2
Sachin Siwach (IND)	5
Frederik Jensen (DEN)	0
Batuhan Ciftci (TUR)	4
Keevin Allicock (GUY)	1
O Tae-bom (PRK)	0
Samuel Kistohurry (FRA)	5
Oussama Mordjane (ALG)	0
Kim Hyung-seung (KOR)	5

Round 3
Sachin Siwach (IND)	5
Batuhan Ciftci (TUR)	0
Samuel Kistohurry (FRA)	5
Kim Hyung-seung (KOR)	0

Round 4
Sachin Siwach (IND)	4
Samuel Kistohurry (FRA)	1

Section 4

Round 1
Carlo Paalam (PHI)	5
Alexei Lagkazasvili (GRE)	0
Ziyad Ali Majrashi (KSA)	0
Şükür Öwezow (TKM)	5
Imad Azoui (MAR)	1
Artur Bazeyan (ARM)	4
Muhammad Haikal (MAS)	0
Yousef Iashash (JOR)	5
Ang Jin Yang (SGP)	0
Lyu Ping (CHN)	5
José de los Santos (DOM)	RSC
Amadu Mohammed (GHA)
Prasanna Podi Arachchige (SRI)	0
Lee Cheng-wei (TPE)	5
Amram Christon (NRU)	2
Wasim Abusal (PLE)	3

Round 2
Carlo Paalam (PHI)	5
Şükür Öwezow (TKM)	0
Artur Bazeyan (ARM)	3
Yousef Iashash (JOR)	2
Lyu Ping (CHN)	2
José de los Santos (DOM)	3
Lee Cheng-wei (TPE)	5
Wasim Abusal (PLE)	0

Round 3
Carlo Paalam (PHI)	4
Artur Bazeyan (ARM)	1
José de los Santos (DOM)	5
Lee Cheng-wei (TPE)	0

Round 4
Carlo Paalam (PHI)	5
José de los Santos (DOM)	0

=== Light welterweight (63.5 kg) ===
Last Quota bout

Quota bout qualifier
Alexandru Paraschiv (MDA)	4
Emilio Garcia (USA)	1
Mukhammedsabyr Bazarbayuly (KAZ)	3
José Viáfara (COL)	2

Quota bout
Alexandru Paraschiv (MDA)	0
Mukhammedsabyr Bazarbayuly (KAZ)	5

Preliminaries
	Score	
John Ume (PNG)	1–4	Mikael Broman (SWE)

Section 1

Round 1
Abdelhaq Nadir (MAR)	5
Mikael Broman (SWE)	0
Sanji Williams (JAM)	1
Mohd Johari Ridzuan (MAS)	4
Alston Ryan (ANT)	0
Alexandru Paraschiv (MDA)	5
Joel Williamson (GUY)	0
Richarno Colin (MRI)	5
Lee Kong Ching (HKG)	0
Saparmyrat Ödäýew (TKM)	5
Vũ Thành Đạt (VIE)	0
Erdenebatyn Tsendbaatar (MGL)	5
David Gkevorgkian (GER)	5
Brayan Salgado (HON)	0
Radoslav Rosenov (BUL)	5
David Karbaš (CZE)	0

Round 2
Abdelhaq Nadir (MAR)	RSC
Mohd Johari Ridzuan (MAS)
Alexandru Paraschiv (MDA)	4
Richarno Colin (MRI)	1
Saparmyrat Ödäýew (TKM)
Erdenebatyn Tsendbaatar (MGL)	WO
David Gkevorgkian (GER)	1
Radoslav Rosenov (BUL)	4

Round 3
Abdelhaq Nadir (MAR)	DSQ
Alexandru Paraschiv (MDA)
Erdenebatyn Tsendbaatar (MGL)	0
Radoslav Rosenov (BUL)	5

Quota bout
Alexandru Paraschiv (MDA)	0
Radoslav Rosenov (BUL)	5

Section 2

Round 1
Rokobuli Elia (FIJ)	0
Hassan Ntumba (COD)	5
Joseph Commey (GHA)	WO
Shpetim Bajoku (KOS)
Emilio Garcia (USA)	4
Ismail Umar (FIN)	1
Pan Jinxiang (CHN)
Robert Jitaru (ROU)	RSC
Fabian Williams (ARU)	3
Filip Poturović (CRO)	2
Abdallah Abou Arab (DEN)	5
Mouas Al-Hawsaw (KSA)	0
Jonas Jonas (NAM)	1
Ali Habibinejad (IRI)	4
Ahmad Shtiwi (ISR)	2
Oier Ibarreche (ESP)	3

Round 2
Hassan Ntumba (COD)	2
Joseph Commey (GHA)	3
Emilio Garcia (USA)	4
Robert Jitaru (ROU)	1
Fabian Williams (ARU)	0
Abdallah Abou Arab (DEN)	5
Ali Habibinejad (IRI)	0
Oier Ibarreche (ESP)	5

Round 3
Joseph Commey (GHA)	0
Emilio Garcia (USA)	5
Abdallah Abou Arab (DEN)	0
Oier Ibarreche (ESP)	5

Quota bout
Emilio Garcia (USA)	0
Oier Ibarreche (ESP)	5

Section 3

Round 1
Cleisson dos Santos (BRA)	5
Bernado Marime (MOZ)	0
Noah Timoteo (ASA)	0
Erislandy Álvarez (CUB)	5
Arsen Chabyan (AUT)
Obaidullah Yackobi (AFG)	WO
Samuel Contrearas (ESA)	0
Yaroslav Khartsyz (UKR)	5
Viliam Tankó (SVK)	0
Gianluigi Malanga (ITA)	5
Prakash Limbu Ijam (NEP)	0
José Maria Núñez (BOL)	5
Criztian Laurente (PHI)	0
Mukhammedsabyr Bazarbayuly (KAZ)	5
Narek Hovhannisyan (ARM)	0
Mizan Aykol (TUR)	5

Round 2
Cleisson dos Santos (BRA)	0
Erislandy Álvarez (CUB)	5
Obaidullah Yackobi (AFG)	0
Yaroslav Khartsyz (UKR)	5
Gianluigi Malanga (ITA)	5
José Maria Núñez (BOL)	0
Mukhammedsabyr Bazarbayuly (KAZ)	5
Mizan Aykol (TUR)	0

Round 3
Erislandy Álvarez (CUB)	3
Yaroslav Khartsyz (UKR)	2
Gianluigi Malanga (ITA)	1
Mukhammedsabyr Bazarbayuly (KAZ)	4

Quota bout
Erislandy Álvarez (CUB)	3
Mukhammedsabyr Bazarbayuly (KAZ)	0

Section 4

Round 1
Abhinash Jamwal (IND)	5
Andriejus Lavrenovas (LTU)	0
José Viáfara (COL)	5
Patris Mughalzai (GBR)	0
Askat Kultaev (KGZ)	3
Aleksej Šendrik (SRB)	2
Alexy de la Cruz (DOM)	5
José Adriel Díaz (PUR)	0
Joshua Toussaint (DMA)	0
Choe Choi-man (PRK)	5
Bartłomiej Rośkowicz (POL)	0
Malik Hasanov (AZE)	5
Shion Nishiyama (JPN)	RSC
Anai Powell (BAH)
Stelios Kirsanidis (GRE)	0
Jang Dong-hwan (KOR)	5

Round 2
Abhinash Jamwal (IND)	0
José Viáfara (COL)	5
Askat Kultaev (KGZ)	2
Alexy de la Cruz (DOM)	3
Choe Choi-man (PRK)	1
Malik Hasanov (AZE)	4
Shion Nishiyama (JPN)	5
Jang Dong-hwan (KOR)	0

Round 3
José Viáfara (COL)	5
Alexy de la Cruz (DOM)	0
Malik Hasanov (AZE)	5
Shion Nishiyama (JPN)	0

Quota bout
José Viáfara (COL)	2
Malik Hasanov (AZE)	3

=== Light middleweight (71 kg) ===
Last Quota bout

Quota bout qualifier
Aidan Walsh (IRL)	5
Jorge Cuéllar (CUB)	0
Vasile Cebotari (MDA)	2
Ángel Llanos (PUR)	3

Quota bout
Aidan Walsh (IRL)	5
Ángel Llanos (PUR)	0

Preliminaries
	Score	
Halstead Lachlan (NRU)	0–5	Eskerkhan Madiev (GEO)
Jhonny Fernández (DOM)	1–4	Damian Durkacz (POL)
Muzamiru Kakande (UGA)	0–5	Jorge Cuéllar (CUB)
Gurgen Madoyan (ARM)	5–0	Christos Karaitis (GRE)
Peerapat Yeasungnoen (THA)	5–0	Juan Cedeno (VEN)
Marcel Meinl (AUT)	RSC–3	Yassine Elouarz (MAR)

Section 1

Round 1
Marko Zeljko (CRO)	0
Eskerkhan Madiev (GEO)	5
Shamser Saidov (TJK)	5
Deniel Krotter (GER)	0
Zeyad Ishaish (JOR)	5
Alban Beqiri (ALB)	0
Stanley Wendell (NZL)	3
Kelvin Soquessa (CZE)	2
Youcef Islam Yaiche (ALG)	3
Salvatore Cavallaro (ITA)	0
Aidan Walsh (IRL)	5
Boniface Maina (KEN)	0
Aleksandr Trofimčiuk (LTU)	5
Ali Maisam Alizada (AFG)	0
Yurii Zakharieiev (UKR)	4
Merven Clair (MRI)	1

Round 2
Eskerkhan Madiev (GEO)	3
Shamser Saidov (TJK)	0
Zeyad Ishaish (JOR)	5
Stanley Wendell (NZL)	0
Youcef Islam Yaiche (ALG)	1
Aidan Walsh (IRL)	4
Aleksandr Trofimčiuk (LTU)	0
Yurii Zakharieiev (UKR)	5

Round 3
Eskerkhan Madiev (GEO)	2
Zeyad Ishaish (JOR)	3
Aidan Walsh (IRL)	3
Yurii Zakharieiev (UKR)	2

Quota bout
Zeyad Ishaish (JOR)	4
Aidan Walsh (IRL)	1

Section 2

Round 1
Sarkhan Aliyev (AZE)	0
Damian Durkacz (POL)	5
Adam Messibah (SUI)	1
Zhang Boxiong (CHN)	4
Nguyễn Đức Long (VIE)
Wanderson Oliveira (BRA)	RSC
Stephen Zimba (ZAM)	KO
Bruno Fernandes (CPV)
Mohamed Rachem (BEL)	5
Shaquon Croes (ARU)	0
Mohammed Bilrrashid (LBA)	0
Henry Malm (GHA)	5
Kevin Scott (SWE)
Steve Kulenguluka (COD)	KO
Jorge Cuéllar (CUB)	WO
Frederick Kiwitt (LBR)

Round 2
Damian Durkacz (POL)	5
Zhang Boxiong (CHN)	0
Wanderson Oliveira (BRA)	5
Stephen Zimba (ZAM)	0
Mohamed Rachem (BEL)	5
Henry Malm (GHA)	0
Steve Kulenguluka (COD)
Jorge Cuéllar (CUB)	WO

Round 3
Damian Durkacz (POL)	4
Wanderson Oliveira (BRA)	1
Mohamed Rachem (BEL)	0
Jorge Cuéllar (CUB)	5

Quota bout
Damian Durkacz (POL)	5
Jorge Cuéllar (CUB)	0

Section 3

Round 1
Kim Il-hyok (PRK)	0
Gurgen Madoyan (ARM)	5
Shain Boniface (SEY)	0
Junior Petanqui (CAN)	5
Vasile Cebotari (MDA)	RSC
Taufa Lavemaau (TGA)
Tevoy Barrett (JAM)	0
Nidal Foqahaa (PLE)	3
Baýramdurdy Nurmuhammedow (TKM)	1
Otgonbaataryn B.-Erdene (MGL)	4
Nishant Dev (IND)	5
Armando Bighafa (GBS)	0
Akseli Saurama (FIN)	1
Nuradin Rustambek (KGZ)	4
Peerapat Yeasungnoen (THA)	4
Toheriri-Hallet Tāwhirimātea (COK)	0

Round 2
Gurgen Madoyan (ARM)	4
Junior Petanqui (CAN)	1
Vasile Cebotari (MDA)	4
Nidal Foqahaa (PLE)	1
Otgonbaataryn B.-Erdene (MGL)
Nishant Dev (IND)	RSC
Nuradin Rustambek (KGZ)	0
Peerapat Yeasungnoen (THA)	5

Round 3
Gurgen Madoyan (ARM)	0
Vasile Cebotari (MDA)	5
Nishant Dev (IND)	5
Peerapat Yeasungnoen (THA)	0

Quota bout
Vasile Cebotari (MDA)	0
Nishant Dev (IND)	5

Section 4

Round 1
Brandon Chávez (HON)	0
Lewis Richardson (GBR)	5
Hassan Kaabi (KSA)
Kasra Tahmasebi (IRI)	KO
Miroslav Kapuler (ISR)	5
Carl Hield (BAH)	0
Tiago Muxanga (MOZ)	RSC
Kendu Steven (PNG)
Alexander Rangel (COL)	5
Lee Sang-min (KOR)	0
Bin Che Azmi Aswan (MAS)	3
Jahanzeb Rizwan (PAK)	2
Sergio Martinez (ESP)	5
Aaron Prince (TTO)	0
Yassine Elouarz (MAR)	1
Ángel Llanos (PUR)	4

Round 2
Lewis Richardson (GBR)	5
Kasra Tahmasebi (IRI)	0
Miroslav Kapuler (ISR)	2
Tiago Muxanga (MOZ)	3
Alexander Rangel (COL)	4
Bin Che Azmi Aswan (MAS)	1
Sergio Martinez (ESP)	0
Ángel Llanos (PUR)	5

Round 3
Lewis Richardson (GBR)	5
Tiago Muxanga (MOZ)	0
Alexander Rangel (COL)	1
Ángel Llanos (PUR)	4

Quota bout
Lewis Richardson (GBR)	5
Ángel Llanos (PUR)	0

=== Light heavyweight (80 kg) ===
Quota bouts

Quota bouts
Cristian Pinales (DOM)	5
Rafayel Hovhannisyan (ARM)	0
Hussein Ishaish (JOR)	0
Weerapon Jongjoho (THA)	5

Quota bout
Rafayel Hovhannisyan (ARM)	0
Hussein Ishaish (JOR)	5

Section 1

Round 1
Saratibau Aminiasi (FIJ)	RSC
Juan Ortíz (COL)
Osaro Aimufua (AUT)	5
Roman Viney (TGA)	0
Desmond Amsterdam (GUY)	0
Cristian Pinales (DOM)	5
Kristiyan Nikolov (BUL)	0
Abhimanyu Loura (IND)	3
Kelyn Cassidy (IRL)	4
Delil Dadaev (GER)	1
Mohamed Houmri (ALG)	DSQ
Gazimagomed Jalidov (ESP)

Round 2
Jeremiah Thomas (TTO)	0
Saratibau Aminiasi (FIJ)	5
Osaro Aimufua (AUT)	0
Cristian Pinales (DOM)	5
Abhimanyu Loura (IND)	0
Kelyn Cassidy (IRL)	5
Gazimagomed Jalidov (ESP)	5
Stiven Aas (EST)	0

Round 3
Saratibau Aminiasi (FIJ)	0
Cristian Pinales (DOM)	5
Kelyn Cassidy (IRL)	2
Gazimagomed Jalidov (ESP)	3

Round 4
Cristian Pinales (DOM)	5
Gazimagomed Jalidov (ESP)	0

Section 2

Round 1
Mohamadou Gory (MLI)
Edwin Owuor (KEN)	RSC
Meisam Gheshlaghi (IRI)	4
Kim Jin-jea (KOR)	1
Mohammed Al-Subhi (KSA)	0
Sebastian Terteryan (DEN)	5
Nguyễn Manh Cuong (VIE)	0
Robertas Liorančas (LTU)	5
Diego Pereira (VEN)	2
Rafayel Hovhannisyan (ARM)	3
Jan Zalaan (ANT)	0
Go Wakaya (JPN)	5

Round 2
Ganzorigiin Dalai (MGL)	5
Edwin Owuor (KEN)	0
Meisam Gheshlaghi (IRI)	5
Sebastian Terteryan (DEN)	0
Robertas Liorančas (LTU)	0
Rafayel Hovhannisyan (ARM)	5
Go Wakaya (JPN)	3
Keven Beausejour (CAN)	2

Round 3
Ganzorigiin Dalai (MGL)	0
Meisam Gheshlaghi (IRI)	5
Rafayel Hovhannisyan (ARM)	3
Go Wakaya (JPN)	2

Round 4
Meisam Gheshlaghi (IRI)	0
Rafayel Hovhannisyan (ARM)	5

Section 3

Round 1
Eldric Sella (EOR)	3
Michail Tsamalidis (GRE)	2
John Harding (SLE)	0
Héctor Aguirre (MEX)	5
Taj Kagho (NZL)	0
Yojerlin César (FRA)	5
Shadiri Bwogi (UGA)	2
Nekruz Salimov (TJK)	3
Daniel Ilyushonok (ISR)	0
Paul Arădoaie (ROU)	5
Charles Cox (BAR)	0
Noa Hadjit (BEL)	5

Round 2
Gradus Kraus (NED)	RSC
Eldric Sella (EOR)
Héctor Aguirre (MEX)	1
Yojerlin César (FRA)	4
Nekruz Salimov (TJK)	2
Paul Arădoaie (ROU)	3
Noa Hadjit (BEL)	0
Hussein Ishaish (JOR)	5

Round 3
Gradus Kraus (NED)	2
Yojerlin César (FRA)	3
Paul Arădoaie (ROU)	0
Hussein Ishaish (JOR)	5

Round 4
Yojerlin César (FRA)	1
Hussein Ishaish (JOR)	4

Section 4

Round 1
Qais Alizada (AFG)	0
Jakub Straszewski (POL)	5
Erik Mendoza (SWE)	0
Mindaugas Gedminas (NOR)	5
Cedrick Belony-Duliepre (HAI)	3
Yusuf Changalawe (TAN)	2
Weerapon Jongjoho (THA)	5
Vladimir Mironchikov (SRB)	0
Robby Gonzales (USA)	5
Ahmed Badrani (MAR)	0
Omurbek Bekzhigit Uulu (KGZ)	5
Andrej Csemez (SVK)	0

Round 2
Peter Pita (COD)	0
Jakub Straszewski (POL)	5
Mindaugas Gedminas (NOR)	5
Cedrick Belony-Duliepre (HAI)	0
Weerapon Jongjoho (THA)	3
Robby Gonzales (USA)	2
Omurbek Bekzhigit Uulu (KGZ)	4
Ramtin Musah (GBR)	1

Round 3
Jakub Straszewski (POL)	5
Mindaugas Gedminas (NOR)	0
Weerapon Jongjoho (THA)	RSC
Omurbek Bekzhigit Uulu (KGZ)

Round 4
Jakub Straszewski (POL)	0
Weerapon Jongjoho (THA)	5

=== Heavyweight (92 kg) ===
Section 1

Round 1
Yakita Aska (ANT)	0
Odal Al-Hindawi (JOR)	5
Soheb Bouafia (FRA)	5
Jung Han-eul (KOR)	0
Nyamdorjiin Otgonbold (MGL)
Noori Silab (AFG)	RSC

Round 2
Victor Schelstraete (BEL)	4
Odal Al-Hindawi (JOR)	1
Narek Manasyan (ARM)	5
Boban Ilioski (MKD)	0
Serhii Horskov (UKR)	0
Soheb Bouafia (FRA)	5
Noori Silab (AFG)	3
Sadam Magomedov (SRB)	2

Round 3
Victor Schelstraete (BEL)	4
Narek Manasyan (ARM)	1
Soheb Bouafia (FRA)	5
Noori Silab (AFG)	0

Quota bout
Victor Schelstraete (BEL)	5
Soheb Bouafia (FRA)	0

Section 2

Round 1
Mateusz Bereźnicki (POL)	5
Adrian Paoletti (AUS)	0
Malcolm Matthes (NZL)	1
Yan Zak (ISR)	4

Round 2
Peter Alwanga (KEN)	0
Mateusz Bereźnicki (POL)	5
Alexander Okafor (GER)	KO
António Rodrigues (POR)
Uke Smajli (SUI)	0
Daniel Guzmán (DOM)	5
Yan Zak (ISR)	0
Mücahit İlyas (TUR)	5

Round 3
Mateusz Bereźnicki (POL)	5
Alexander Okafor (GER)	0
Daniel Guzmán (DOM)	5
Mücahit İlyas (TUR)	0

Quota bout
Mateusz Bereźnicki (POL)	5
Daniel Guzmán (DOM)	0

Section 3

Round 1
Dávid Michálek (SVK)	WO
Julio Castillo (ECU)
Jonathan Tetteh (GHA)	0
Loren Alfonso (AZE)	5

Round 2
Erkin Adylbek Uulu (KGZ)	5
Dávid Michálek (SVK)	0
Marlon Hurtado (COL)	0
Aryan Saed Panah (EOR)	5
Luis Sánchez (VEN)	0
Sanjeet Kumar (IND)	5
Loren Alfonso (AZE)	5
Marko Čalić (CRO)	0

Round 3
Erkin Adylbek Uulu (KGZ)	5
Aryan Saed Panah (EOR)	0
Sanjeet Kumar (IND)	0
Loren Alfonso (AZE)	5

Quota bout
Erkin Adylbek Uulu (KGZ)	0
Loren Alfonso (AZE)	5

Section 4

Round 1
Rogelio Romero (MEX)	RSC
Sultan Al-Musaed (KSA)
Georgii Kushitashvili (GEO)	RSC
Emmanuel Pompey (GUY)
Ali Fathi (IRI)
Jamar Talley (USA)	RSC

Round 2
Vagkan Nanitzanian (GRE)	3
Rogelio Romero (MEX)	0
Georgii Kushitashvili (GEO)	5
Michel Erpelding (LUX)	0
Regarn Simbwa (UGA)	5
Koppány Fehér (HUN)	0
Jamar Talley (USA)	5
Leclerc Nogaus (HAI)	0

Round 3
Vagkan Nanitzanian (GRE)	0
Georgii Kushitashvili (GEO)	5
Regarn Simbwa (UGA)	0
Jamar Talley (USA)	5

Quota bout
Georgii Kushitashvili (GEO)	3
Jamar Talley (USA)	2

=== Super heavyweight (+92 kg) ===
Preliminaries
	Score	
Willys Mendoza (COL)	3–0	Younes Bodhdid (MAR)
Mark Ahondjo (GHA)	0–5	Kennedy St-Pierre (MRI)

Section 1

Round 1		Round 2		Quota bout
Gilbert Kabamba (COD)	2
Willys Mendoza (COL)	3	Willys Mendoza (COL)	0
Narender Berwal (IND)	2	Gerlon Congo (ECU)	5
Gerlon Congo (ECU)	3			Gerlon Congo (ECU)	3
Delroy Jno Charles (DMA)	DSQ			Fernando Arzola (CUB)	2
Khaligiin Byeknur (MGL)		Khaligiin Byeknur (MGL)	0
Fernando Arzola (CUB)	5	Fernando Arzola (CUB)	5
Javier Cruz (MEX)	0

Section 2

Round 1		Round 2		Quota bout
Đoàn Ngọc Minh Hiếu (VIE)
Martin McDonagh (IRL)	RSC	Martin McDonagh (IRL)	5
Peter Belberov (BUL)	5	Peter Belberov (BUL)	0
Uğur Aydemir (TUR)	0			Martin McDonagh (IRL)	2
Davit Chaloyan (ARM)	5			Davit Chaloyan (ARM)	3
Danis Latypov (BRN)	0	Davit Chaloyan (ARM)	5
Rouzbeh Safari (IRI)	5	Rouzbeh Safari (IRI)	0
Keddy Agnes (SEY)	0

Section 3

Round 1		Round 2		Quota bout
Muhammad Abroridinov (TJK)	5
Kim Do-hyeon (KOR)	0	Muhammad Abroridinov (TJK)	0
Doni Foreman (CAN)	0	Ayoub Ghadfa (ESP)	5
Ayoub Ghadfa (ESP)	5			Ayoub Ghadfa (ESP)	4
Dušan Veletić (SRB)	0			Ahmed Hagag (AUT)	1
Ahmed Hagag (AUT)	5	Ahmed Hagag (AUT)	3
Bayikewuzi Danabieke (CHN)	RSC	Bayikewuzi Danabieke (CHN)	2
Jonas Jazevičius (LTU)

Section 4

Round 1		Round 2		Quota bout
Oskar Safaryan (POL)	1
Stylianos Roulias (GRE)	4	Stylianos Roulias (GRE)	5
Nigel Paul (TTO)	1	George Hola (TGA)	0
George Hola (TGA)	4			Stylianos Roulias (GRE)	0
Dmytro Lovchynskyi (UKR)	3			Dmytro Lovchynskyi (UKR)	5
Ifeanyi Onyekwere (NGR)	2	Dmytro Lovchynskyi (UKR)	4
Kennedy St-Pierre (MRI)	0	Luka Pratljačić (CRO)	1
Luka Pratljačić (CRO)	5

== Women's results ==
=== Light flyweight (50 kg) ===
Preliminaries
	Score	
Nicole Ďuríková (SVK)	–RSC	Nazym Kyzaibay (KAZ)
Rita Soares (POR)	RSC–	Lee Sze Man (HKG)

Section 1

Round 1		Round 2		Quota bout
Jung Joo-hyung (KOR)	0
Nazym Kyzaibay (KAZ)	5	Nazym Kyzaibay (KAZ)	5
Savannah Stubley (GBR)	5	Savannah Stubley (GBR)	0
Sofie Rosshaug (DEN)	0			Nazym Kyzaibay (KAZ)	5
Natalia Kuczewska (POL)	1			Kang Su-hyang (PRK)	0
Tetiana Kob (UKR)	4	Tetiana Kob (UKR)	0
Nguyễn Thi Ngoc Tran (VIE)	0	Kang Su-hyang (PRK)	5
Kang Su-hyang (PRK)	5

Section 2

Round 1		Round 2		Quota bout
Aylin Jamez (GUA)	3
Margret Tembo (ZAM)	2	Aylin Jamez (GUA)	0
Anush Grigoryan (ARM)	1	Daina Moorehouse (IRL)	5
Daina Moorehouse (IRL)	4			Daina Moorehouse (IRL)	4
Tayonis Cedeño (VEN)	0			Zlatislava Chukanova (BUL)	1
Zlatislava Chukanova (BUL)	5	Zlatislava Chukanova (BUL)	4
Rinka Kinoshita (JPN)	5	Rinka Kinoshita (JPN)	1
Ruhafzo Haqnazarova (TJK)	0

Section 3

Round 1		Round 2		Quota bout
Grace Fanhbulleh (LBR)	0
Zainab Adeshina (NGR)	5	Zainab Adeshina (NGR)	3
Hanan Nassar (JOR)	4	Hanan Nassar (JOR)	2
Marjona Savrieva (AZE)	1			Zainab Adeshina (NGR)	1
Kalthoom Hantool (KSA)	0			Pihla Kaivo-oja (FIN)	4
Kathreen Sterling (HAI)	5	Kathreen Sterling (HAI)	0
Pihla Kaivo-oja (FIN)	5	Pihla Kaivo-oja (FIN)	5
Guo Yi-xuan (TPE)	0

Section 4

Round 1		Round 2		Quota bout
Mckenzie Wright (CAN)	5
Aldana López (ARG)	0	Mckenzie Wright (CAN)	5
Nina Radovanović (SRB)	5	Nina Radovanović (SRB)	0
Mihaela Bădescu (ROU)	0			Mckenzie Wright (CAN)	0
Fátima Herrera (MEX)	5			Fátima Herrera (MEX)	5
Danisha Mathialagan (SGP)	0	Fátima Herrera (MEX)	5
Rita Soares (POR)	2	Susan Aguas (ECU)	0
Susan Aguas (ECU)	3

=== Bantamweight (54 kg) ===
Preliminaries
	Score	
Estéfani Almánzar (DOM)	1–4	Sandra Drabik (POL)

Section 1

Round 1		Round 2		Quota bout
Johana Gómez (VEN)	3
Sandra Drabik (POL)	2	Johana Gómez (VEN)	5
Ulzhan Sarsenbek (KAZ)	0	Shera Patricio (USA)	0
Shera Patricio (USA)	5			Johana Gómez (VEN)	2
Scarlett Delgado (CAN)	5			Möngöntsetsegiin Enkhjargal (MGL)	3
Amina Faki (KEN)	0	Scarlett Delgado (CAN)	0
Möngöntsetsegiin Enkhjargal (MGL)	5	Möngöntsetsegiin Enkhjargal (MGL)	5
Mikoto Harada (JPN)	0

Section 2

Round 1		Round 2		Quota bout
Romane Moulai (FRA)	5
Denisse Bravo (CHI)	0	Romane Moulai (FRA)	1
Zeina Nassar (GER)	0	Im Ae-ji (KOR)	4
Im Ae-ji (KOR)	5			Im Ae-ji (KOR)	5
Ornella Havyarimana (BDI)	5			Zeynab Rahimova (AZE)	0
Lala Kargar (AFG)	0	Ornella Havyarimana (BDI)	0
Itati Zuleta (BOL)	0	Zeynab Rahimova (AZE)	5
Zeynab Rahimova (AZE)	5

Section 3

Round 1		Round 2		Quota bout
Anjani Teli (NEP)	5
Winnie Au (HKG)	0	Anjani Teli (NEP)	0
Bele Phekie (BOT)	0	Bojana Gojković (MNE)	5
Bojana Gojković (MNE)	5			Bojana Gojković (MNE)	0
Perla Bazaldua (MEX)	1			Huang Hsiao-wen (TPE)	5
Huang Hsiao-wen (TPE)	4	Huang Hsiao-wen (TPE)	RSC
Melissa Mortensen (DEN)	5	Melissa Mortensen (DEN)
Marta López (ESP)	0

Section 4

Round 1		Round 2		Quota bout
Jennifer Lehane (IRL)	4
Angelyris López (PUR)	1	Jennifer Lehane (IRL)	5
Anastasiia Kovalchuk (UKR)	3	Anastasiia Kovalchuk (UKR)	0
Islem Ferchichi (TUN)	2			Jennifer Lehane (IRL)	5
Hanna Lakotár (HUN)	ABD			Hanna Lakotár (HUN)	0
Fotima Begmuradova (TJK)		Hanna Lakotár (HUN)	4
Sara Swensson (SWE)	0	Ekaterina Sycheva (ARM)	0
Ekaterina Sycheva (ARM)	5

=== Featherweight (57 kg) ===
Preliminaries
	Score	
Alyssa Mendoza (USA)	5–0	Tömörkhuyagiin Bolortuul (MGL)

Section 1

Round 1		Round 2		Quota bout
Olga-Pavlina Papadatou (GRE)	0
Alyssa Mendoza (USA)	5	Alyssa Mendoza (USA)	5
Hadeel Ashour (KSA)	0	Anastasiia Molochko (UKR)	0
Anastasiia Molochko (UKR)	5			Alyssa Mendoza (USA)	5
Josefien Betist (SLE)	WO			Maud van der Toorn (NED)	0
Marie Al-Ahmadieh (CAN)		Josefien Betist (SLE)	0
Maud van der Toorn (NED)	4	Maud van der Toorn (NED)	5
Guadalupe Solis (MEX)	1

Section 2

Round 1		Round 2		Quota bout
Xu Zichun (CHN)	5
Paek Jin-hyang (PRK)	0	Xu Zichun (CHN)	5
Dana A (QAT)		Lucie Horváth Sedláčková (CZE)	0
Lucie Horváth Sedláčková (CZE)	RSC			Xu Zichun (CHN)	5
Maria Nechita (ROU)	3			Maria Nechita (ROU)	0
Satsuki Yoshizawa (JPN)	2	Maria Nechita (ROU)	4
Nancy Tas (GER)	4	Nancy Tas (GER)	1
Szabina Szűcs (HUN)	1

Section 3

Round 1		Round 2		Quota bout
Fe'ofa'aki Epenisa (TGA)
Elise Glynn (GBR)	WO	Elise Glynn (GBR)	0
Marine Camara (MLI)	5	Marine Camara (MLI)	5
Minerva Montiel (PAR)	0			Marine Camara (MLI)	0
Laura Jakovleva (LAT)	2			Jaismine Lamboria (IND)	5
Ana Milisic (SUI)	3	Ana Milisic (SUI)	0
Jaismine Lamboria (IND)	5	Jaismine Lamboria (IND)	5
Mahsati Hamzayeva Aghamaliyeva (AZE)	0

Section 4

Round 1		Round 2		Quota bout
Anđela Branković (SRB)	2
Esra Yıldız (TUR)	3	Esra Yıldız (TUR)	5
Jenifer Fernández (ESP)	5	Jenifer Fernández (ESP)	0
Jin Hye-jeong (KOR)	0			Esra Yıldız (TUR)	5
Jasmine Daunakamakama (FIJ)	1			Nilawan Techasuep (THA)	0
Nguyễn Huyền Trân (VIE)	4	Nguyễn Huyền Trân (VIE)	0
Nilawan Techasuep (THA)	5	Nilawan Techasuep (THA)	5
Nikolina Ćaćić (CRO)	0

=== Lightweight (60 kg) ===
Quota bouts

Quota bouts
Agnes Alexiusson (SWE)	5
Hà Thị Linh (VIE)	0
Vilma Viitanen (FIN)	0
Oh Yeon-ji (KOR)	5

Quota bout
Hà Thị Linh (VIE)	4
Vilma Viitanen (FIN)	1

Section 1

Round 1
Agnes Alexiusson (SWE)	RSC
Teretia Toauriri Kabuaua (KIR)
Felicitas Ganglbauer (GER)	0
Rimma Volossenko (KAZ)	5
Monkhoryn Namuun (MGL)	1
Ankushita Boro (IND)	4

Round 2
Rashida Tagirova (UZB)	0
Agnes Alexiusson (SWE)	5
Rimma Volossenko (KAZ)	1
Ankushita Boro (IND)	4

Round 3
Agnes Alexiusson (SWE)	3
Ankushita Boro (IND)	2

Section 2

Round 1		Round 2		Round 3
Zann Chee (SGP)	0
Camila Pineiro (URU)	5	Camila Pineiro (URU)	1
Hà Thị Linh (VIE)	4	Hà Thị Linh (VIE)	4
Ana Starovoitova (LTU)	1			Hà Thị Linh (VIE)	4
Ayaka Taguchi (JPN)	1			Sara Beram (CRO)	1
Sara Beram (CRO)	4	Sara Beram (CRO)	5
Miroslava Jedináková (SVK)	RSC	Miroslava Jedináková (SVK)	0
Ragad Al-Naimi (KSA)

Section 3

Round 1		Round 2		Round 3
Anna Jenni (SUI)	2
Klaudia Budasz (POL)	3	Klaudia Budasz (POL)	4
Vladislava Kukhta (HUN)	5	Vladislava Kukhta (HUN)	1
Loredana Marin (ROU)	0			Klaudia Budasz (POL)
Tianna Guy (TTO)	0			Vilma Viitanen (FIN)	RSC
Vilma Viitanen (FIN)	5	Vilma Viitanen (FIN)	4
Hanna Okhrei (UKR)	5	Hanna Okhrei (UKR)	1
Shoira Zulkaynarova (TJK)	0

Section 4

Round 1		Round 2		Round 3
Sheila Martínez (ESP)	0
Amy Broadhurst (GBR)	5	Amy Broadhurst (GBR)	5
Terris Smith (CAN)	3	Terris Smith (CAN)	0
Aslahan Mehmedova (BUL)	0			Amy Broadhurst (GBR)	1
Carolina Ferreira (POR)	0			Oh Yeon-ji (KOR)	4
Oh Yeon-ji (KOR)	5	Oh Yeon-ji (KOR)	4
		Esmeralda Falcón (MEX)	1

=== Welterweight (66 kg) ===
Preliminaries
	Score	
Joana Nwamerue (BUL)	0–5	Navbakhor Khamidova (UZB)
Brigitte Mbabi (COD)	RSC–	Saida Lahmidi (MAR)
Crinuţa Sebe (ROU)	0–5	Yakelín Estornell (CUB)
Camila Camilo (COL)	5–0	Ganzorigiin Badmaarag (MGL)
Grainne Walsh (IRL)	5–0	Hoàng Ngọc Mai (VIE)

Section 1

Round 1		Round 2		Quota bout
Leonie Müller (GER)	2
Navbakhor Khamidova (UZB)	3	Navbakhor Khamidova (UZB)	5
Seon Su-jin (KOR)	4	Seon Su-jin (KOR)	0
Shahia Allahverdiyeva (AZE)	1			Navbakhor Khamidova (UZB)	5
Paraskevi Mavrommati (GRE)	0			Kristina Kuluhova (SRB)	0
Luna Beeloo (NED)	5	Luna Beeloo (NED)	1
Natalya Bogdanova (KAZ)	2	Kristina Kuluhova (SRB)	4
Kristina Kuluhova (SRB)	3

Section 2

Round 1		Round 2		Quota bout
Anastasiia Chernokolenko (UKR)	0
Brigitte Mbabi (COD)	4	Brigitte Mbabi (COD)	5
Mai Kito (JPN)	5	Mai Kito (JPN)	0
Krista Kovalainen (FIN)	0			Brigitte Mbabi (COD)	RSC
Gricelda Durán (MEX)	0			Ivanusa Moreira (CPV)
Ivanusa Moreira (CPV)	5	Ivanusa Moreira (CPV)	5
Yakelín Estornell (CUB)	0	Sara Kali (CAN)	0
Sara Kali (CAN)	5

Section 3

Round 1		Round 2		Quota bout
Tamara Radunović (MNE)	0
Camila Camilo (COL)	5	Camila Camilo (COL)	0
Friza Asiko (KEN)	0	Emilie Sonvico (FRA)	5
Emilie Sonvico (FRA)	5			Emilie Sonvico (FRA)	2
Jessica Triebeľová (SVK)	5			Jessica Triebeľová (SVK)	3
Beatrise Rozentāle (LAT)	0	Jessica Triebeľová (SVK)	4
Arundhati Choudhary (IND)	5	Arundhati Choudhary (IND)	1
Stephanie Piñeiro (PUR)	0

Section 4

Round 1		Round 2		Quota bout
Blessing Oraekwe (NGR)	0
Ani Hovsepyan (ARM)	5	Ani Hovsepyan (ARM)	KO
Cara Wharerau (NZL)	4	Cara Wharerau (NZL)
Sheilla Yama (PNG)	1			Ani Hovsepyan (ARM)	0
Nilufar Boboyorova (TJK)	1			Grainne Walsh (IRL)	5
Sedja Sanogo (CIV)	4	Sedja Sanogo (CIV)	0
Grainne Walsh (IRL)	5	Grainne Walsh (IRL)	5
Hwang Hyo-sun (PRK)	0

=== Middleweight (75 kg) ===
Section 1

Round 1		Round 2		Quota bout
		Melissa Gemini (ITA)	5
Eseta Flint (TGA)	1	Büşra Işıldar (TUR)	0
Büşra Işıldar (TUR)	4			Melissa Gemini (ITA)	1
Seong Su-yeon (KOR)	3			Baison Manikon (THA)	4
Rady Gramane (MOZ)	1	Seong Su-yeon (KOR)	1
Baison Manikon (THA)	5	Baison Manikon (THA)	4
Gabrielė Stonkutė (LTU)	0

Section 2

Round 1		Round 2		Quota bout
Kitija Zārberga (LAT)	0
Aziza Zokirova (UZB)	5	Aziza Zokirova (UZB)	2
Lưu Diễm Quỳnh (VIE)	0	Maryelis Yriza (VEN)	3
Maryelis Yriza (VEN)	5			Maryelis Yriza (VEN)	0
Veronika Nakota (HUN)	5			Hergie Bacyadan (PHI)	5
Love Holgersson (SWE)	0	Veronika Nakota (HUN)	2
Dunia Martínez (ESP)	0	Hergie Bacyadan (PHI)	3
Hergie Bacyadan (PHI)	5

Section 3

Round 1		Round 2		Quota bout
Kimberly Gittens (BAR)	1
Enkhbaataryn Erdenetuyaa (MGL)	4	Enkhbaataryn Erdenetuyaa (MGL)	0
Karolina Makhno (UKR)	0	Valentina Khalzova (KAZ)	5
Valentina Khalzova (KAZ)	5			Valentina Khalzova (KAZ)	5
Monika Langerová (CZE)	1			Shirleidis Orozco (COL)	0
Ornella Sathoud (GHA)	4	Ornella Sathoud (GHA)	0
Aynur Rzayeva (AZE)	0	Shirleidis Orozco (COL)	5
Shirleidis Orozco (COL)	3

Section 4

Round 1		Round 2		Quota bout
Citlalli Ortiz (MEX)	5
Deanne Read (NZL)	0	Citlalli Ortiz (MEX)	5
Elizabeth Andiego (KEN)	0	Irina Schönberger (GER)	0
Irina Schönberger (GER)	5			Citlalli Ortiz (MEX)	5
Naomi Graham (USA)	1			Patricia Mbata (NGR)	0
Viviane Pereira (BRA)	4	Viviane Pereira (BRA)	1
		Patricia Mbata (NGR)	4
