= 2024 Summer Olympics closing ceremony flag bearers =

During the closing ceremony of the 2024 Summer Olympics in Paris, the flag bearers for the 205 National Olympic Committee's (NOCs) and the IOC Refugee Olympic Team entered Stade de France. The flags of each country were not necessarily carried by the same flag bearer as in the opening ceremony. Like the opening ceremony, each team had an option of having two flag bearers, one man and one woman, to promote gender equality.

== Countries and flag bearers ==
The following is a list of each country's flag bearer. The list is sorted in the official order of the International Olympic Committee (IOC), even though nations appeared in no particular order in the parade of nations, not all of the National Olympic Committees were able to select a flag bearer for the closing ceremony, a games volunteer was represented instead. Names are being given as officially designated by the IOC.

Order	Team	French	Flag bearer(s)	Sport(s)	Ref.
1	Greece	Grèce	Emmanouil Karalis	Athletics	
1	Greece	Grèce	Evangelia Platanioti	Artistic swimming	
2	Refugee Olympic Team	Équipe olympique des réfugiés	Kasra Mehdipournejad	Taekwondo	
2	Refugee Olympic Team	Équipe olympique des réfugiés	Farida Abaroge	Athletics	
3	Afghanistan	Afghanistan	Sha Mahmood Noor Zahi	Athletics	
3	Afghanistan	Afghanistan	Yulduz Hashimi	Cycling	
4	South Africa	Afrique du Sud	Tatjana Smith	Swimming	
5	Albania	Albanie	Islam Dudaev	Wrestling	
6	Algeria	Algérie	Djamel Sedjati	Athletics	
6	Algeria	Algérie	Kaylia Nemour (Note: Imane Khelif was originally chosen but was replaced by gymnast Kaylia Nemour.)	Gymnastics	
7	Germany	Allemagne	Max Rendschmidt	Canoeing	
7	Germany	Allemagne	Laura Lindemann	Triathlon	
8	Andorra	Andorre	Nahuel Carabaña	Athletics	
9	Angola	Angola	Edmilson Pedro	Judo	
10	Antigua and Barbuda	Antigua-et-Barbuda	Cejhae Greene	Athletics	
11	Saudi Arabia	Arabie saoudite	Mohammed Tolo	Athletics	
11	Saudi Arabia	Arabie saoudite	Dunya Abu Taleb	Taekwondo	
12	Argentina	Argentine	José Torres	Cycling	
12	Argentina	Argentine	Eugenia Bosco	Sailing	
13	Armenia	Arménie	Artur Aleksanyan	Wrestling	
14	Aruba	Aruba	Ethan Westera	Sailing	
14	Aruba	Aruba	Shanayah Howell	Cycling	
15	Austria	Autriche	Lukas Mähr	Sailing	
15	Austria	Autriche	Lara Vadlau	Sailing	
16	Azerbaijan	Azerbaïdjan	Gashim Magomedov	Taekwondo	
16	Azerbaijan	Azerbaïdjan	Zeynab Hummatova	Gymnastics	
17	Bahamas	Bahamas	Charisma Taylor	Athletics	
18	Bahrain	Bahreïn	Akhmed Tazhudinov	Wrestling	
19	Bangladesh	Bangladesh	No athletes present for Closing Ceremony		
20	Barbados	Barbade	Matthew Wright	Triathlon	
21	Belgium	Belgique	Nafissatou Thiam	Athletics	
22	Belize	Belize	Shaun Gill	Athletics	
23	Benin	Bénin	Alexis Dodji Kpade	Swimming	
23	Benin	Bénin	Noélie Yarigo	Athletics	
24	Bermuda	Bermudes	Dara Alizadeh	Rowing	
25	Bhutan	Bhoutan	Kinzang Lhamo	Athletics	
26	Bolivia	Bolivie	Héctor Garibay	Athletics	
26	Bolivia	Bolivie	Guadalupe Torrez	Athletics	
27	Bosnia and Herzegovina	Bosnie-Herzégovine	Lana Pudar	Swimming	
28	Botswana	Botswana	Letsile Tebogo	Athletics	
28	Botswana	Botswana	Oratile Nowe	Athletics	
29	Brazil	Brésil	Ana Patrícia Ramos	Volleyball	
29	Brazil	Brésil	Eduarda Lisboa	Volleyball	
30	Brunei	Brunéi Darussalam	Hayley Wong	Swimming	
31	Bulgaria	Bulgarie	Semen Novikov	Wrestling	
31	Bulgaria	Bulgarie	Boryana Kaleyn	Gymnastics	
32	Burkina Faso	Burkina Faso	Hugues Fabrice Zango	Athletics	
32	Burkina Faso	Burkina Faso	Marthe Koala	Athletics	
33	Burundi	Burundi	Ange Ciella Niragira	Judo	
34	Cape Verde	Cabo Verde	Samuel Freire	Athletics	
34	Cape Verde	Cabo Verde	Ivanusa Moreira	Boxing	
35	Cayman Islands	Îles Caïmans	No athletes present for Closing Ceremony		
36	Cambodia	Cambodge	Chhun Bunthorn	Athletics	
36	Cambodia	Cambodge	Sakbun Apsara	Swimming	
37	Cameroon	Cameroun	Emmanuel Eseme	Athletics	
37	Cameroon	Cameroun	Richelle Anita Soppi Mbella	Judo	
38	Canada	Canada	Ethan Katzberg	Athletics	
38	Canada	Canada	Summer McIntosh	Swimming	
39	Central African Republic	République centrafricaine	Tracy Marine Andet	Swimming	
39	Central African Republic	République centrafricaine	Herve Toumandji	Athletics	
40	Chile	Chili	Fernanda Aguirre	Taekwondo	
40	Chile	Chili	Clemente Seguel	Sailing	
41	China	République populaire de Chine	Li Fabin	Weightlifting	
41	China	République populaire de Chine	Ou Zixia	Field hockey	
42	Cyprus	Chypre	Vera Tugolukova	Gymnastics	
43	Colombia	Colombie	Mariana Pajón	Cycling	
44	Comoros	Comores	Hachim Maaroufou	Athletics	
44	Comoros	Comores	Maesha Saadi	Swimming	
45	Republic of the Congo	Congo	Natacha Ngoye	Athletics	
46	Democratic Republic of the Congo	République démocratique du Congo	Brigitte Mbabi	Boxing	
47	Cook Islands	Îles Cook	Lanihei Connolly	Swimming	
48	South Korea	République de Corée	Park Tae-joon	Taekwondo	
48	South Korea	République de Corée	Im Ae-ji	Boxing	
49	Costa Rica	Costa Rica	Gerald Drummond	Athletics	
49	Costa Rica	Costa Rica	Milagro Mena	Cycling	
50	Ivory Coast	Côte d'Ivoire	Arthur Cissé	Athletics	
50	Ivory Coast	Côte d'Ivoire	Maboundou Koné	Athletics	
51	Croatia	Croatie	Ivan Šapina	Taekwondo	
51	Croatia	Croatie	Lena Stojković	Taekwondo	
52	Cuba	Cuba	Yarisleidis Cirilo	Canoeing	
52	Cuba	Cuba	Mijaín López	Wrestling	
53	Denmark	Danemark	Turpal Bisultanov	Wrestling	
53	Denmark	Danemark	Helena Rosendahl Bach	Swimming	
54	Djibouti	Djibouti	Ibrahim Hassan	Athletics	
55	Dominican Republic	République dominicaine	Alexander Ogando	Athletics	
55	Dominican Republic	République dominicaine	Beatriz Pirón	Weightlifting	
56	Dominica	Dominique	Thea LaFond	Athletics	
57	Egypt	Égypte	Ahmed Elgendy	Modern pentathlon	
57	Egypt	Égypte	Sara Ahmed	Weightlifting	
58	El Salvador	El Salvador	No athletes present for Closing Ceremony		
59	United Arab Emirates	Émirats arabes unis	No athletes present for Closing Ceremony		
60	Ecuador	Équateur	Brian Pintado	Athletics	
60	Ecuador	Équateur	Neisi Dájomes	Weightlifting	
61	Eritrea	Érythrée	Samson Amare	Athletics	
61	Eritrea	Érythrée	Dolshi Tesfu	Athletics	
62	Spain	Espagne	Jordan Díaz	Athletics	
62	Spain	Espagne	María Pérez	Athletics	
63	Estonia	Estonie	Janek Õiglane	Athletics	
63	Estonia	Estonie	Reena Pärnat	Archery	
64	Eswatini	Eswatini	Sibusiso Matsenjwa	Athletics	
65	Ethiopia	Éthiopie	Kenenisa Bekele	Athletics	
66	Fiji	Fidji	David Young	Swimming	
66	Fiji	Fidji	Venice Traill	Taekwondo	
67	Finland	Finlande	Saga Vanninen	Athletics	
68	Gabon	Gabon	Wissy Frank Hoye	Athletics	
68	Gabon	Gabon	Noelie Annette Lacour	Swimming	
69	The Gambia	Gambie	Alasan Ann	Taekwondo	
69	The Gambia	Gambie	Gina Mariam Bass Bittaye	Athletics	
70	Georgia	Géorgie	Geno Petriashvili	Wrestling	
71	Ghana	Ghana	Joseph Paul Amoah	Athletics	
71	Ghana	Ghana	Rose Amoanimaa Yeboah	Athletics	
72	Great Britain	Grande-Bretagne	Alex Yee	Triathlon	
72	Great Britain	Grande-Bretagne	Bryony Page	Gymnastics	
73	Grenada	Grenade	Halle Hazzard	Athletics	
73	Grenada	Grenade	Kirani James	Athletics	
74	Guam	Guam	Mia-Lahnee Aquino	Wrestling	
75	Guatemala	Guatemala	Alberto González Mindez	Athletics	
75	Guatemala	Guatemala	Adriana Ruano Oliva	Shooting	
76	Guinea	Guinée	Elhadj N'gane Diallo	Swimming	
76	Guinea	Guinée	Fatoumata Sylla	Archery	
77	Guinea-Bissau	Guinée-Bissau	Diamantino Iuna Fafé	Wrestling	
78	Equatorial Guinea	Guinée équatoriale	No athletes present for Closing Ceremony		
79	Guyana	Guyana	Emanuel Archibald	Athletics	
79	Guyana	Guyana	Aliyah Abrams	Athletics	
80	Haiti	Haïti	Cedrick Belony-Duliepre	Boxing	
80	Haiti	Haïti	Emelia Chatfield	Athletics	
81	Honduras	Honduras	Kevin Mejía	Wrestling	
81	Honduras	Honduras	Julimar Ávila	Swimming	
82	Hong Kong	Hong Kong, Chine	Lo Wai Fung	Taekwondo	
82	Hong Kong	Hong Kong, Chine	Lee Sze Wing	Cycling	
83	Hungary	Hongrie	Kristóf Milák	Swimming	
83	Hungary	Hongrie	Tamara Csipes	Canoeing	
84	India	Inde	P. R. Sreejesh	Field hockey	
84	India	Inde	Manu Bhaker	Shooting	
85	Indonesia	Indonésie	Rizki Juniansyah	Weightlifting	
86	Iran	République islamique d'Iran	Arian Salimi	Taekwondo	
86	Iran	République islamique d'Iran	Fatemeh Mojallal	Rowing	
87	Iraq	Iraq	Ali Rubaiawi	Weightlifting	
88	Ireland	Irlande	Fintan McCarthy (Note: Daniel Wiffen was originally chosen but withdrew after contracting an illness. He was replaced by rower Fintan McCarthy.)	Rowing	
88	Ireland	Irlande	Mona McSharry	Swimming	
89	Iceland	Islande	Erna Sóley Gunnarsdóttir	Athletics	
90	Israel	Israël	Tom Reuveny	Sailing	
90	Israel	Israël	Romi Paritzki	Gymnastics	
91	Italy	Italie	Gregorio Paltrinieri	Swimming	
91	Italy	Italie	Rossella Fiamingo	Fencing	
92	Jamaica	Jamaïque	Rajindra Campbell	Athletics	
93	Japan	Japon	Haruka Kitaguchi	Athletics	
94	Jordan	Jordanie	Zaid Kareem	Taekwondo	
94	Jordan	Jordanie	Julyana Al-Sadeq	Taekwondo	
95	Kazakhstan	Kazakhstan	Batyrkhan Toleugali	Taekwondo	
95	Kazakhstan	Kazakhstan	Elzhana Taniyeva	Gymnastics	
96	Kenya	Kenya	Eliud Kipchoge	Athletics	
96	Kenya	Kenya	Faith Kipyegon	Athletics	
97	Kyrgyzstan	Kirghizistan	Akzhol Makhmudov	Wrestling	
97	Kyrgyzstan	Kirghizistan	Aisuluu Tynybekova	Wrestling	
98	Kiribati	Kiribati	Kaimauri Erati	Weightlifting	
99	Kosovo	Kosovo	Adell Sabovic	Swimming	
99	Kosovo	Kosovo	Gresa Bakraçi	Athletics	
100	Kuwait	Koweït	No athletes present for Closing Ceremony		
101	Laos	République démocratique populaire lao	Praewa Misato Philaphandeth	Gymnastics	
102	Lesotho	Lesotho	Tebello Ramakongoana	Athletics	
102	Lesotho	Lesotho	Mokulubete Blandina Makatisi	Athletics	
103	Latvia	Lettonie	Ernests Zēbolds	Cycling	
103	Latvia	Lettonie	Gunta Vaičule	Athletics	
104	Lebanon	Liban	Laetitia Aoun	Taekwondo	
105	Liberia	Libéria	John Sherman	Athletics	
106	Libya	Libye	No athletes present for Closing Ceremony		
107	Liechtenstein	Liechtenstein	No athletes present for Closing Ceremony		
108	Lithuania	Lituanie	Dominika Banevič	Breaking	
109	Luxembourg	Luxembourg	Patrizia van der Weken	Athletics	
110	North Macedonia	Macédoine du Nord	Vladimir Egorov	Wrestling	
111	Madagascar	Madagascar	Rosina Randafiarison	Weightlifting	
112	Malaysia	Malaisie	Ashley Lau	Golf	
113	Malawi	Malawi	No athletes present for Closing Ceremony		
114	Maldives	Maldives	Mohamed Aan Hussain	Swimming	
114	Maldives	Maldives	Aishath Ulya Shaig	Swimming	
115	Mali	Mali	Alexien Kouma	Swimming	
115	Mali	Mali	Marine Camara	Boxing	
116	Malta	Malte	Katryna Esposito	Judo	
117	Morocco	Maroc	Bilal Mallakh	Breaking	
117	Morocco	Maroc	Oumaima El-Bouchti	Taekwondo	
118	Marshall Islands	Îles Marshall	Philipp Kinono	Swimming	
118	Marshall Islands	Îles Marshall	Mathlynn Sasser	Weightlifting	
119	Mauritius	Maurice	Jean de Falbaire	Sailing	
120	Mauritania	Mauritanie	No athletes present for Closing Ceremony		
121	Mexico	Mexique	Marco Verde	Boxing	
121	Mexico	Mexique	Nuria Diosdado	Artistic swimming	
122	Federated States of Micronesia	États fédérés de Micronésie	No athletes present for Closing Ceremony		
123	Moldova	République de Moldova	Serghei Tarnovschi	Canoeing	
123	Moldova	République de Moldova	Anastasia Nichita	Wrestling	
124	Monaco	Monaco	Quentin Antognelli	Rowing	
124	Monaco	Monaco	Lisa Pou	Swimming	
125	Mongolia	Mongolie	Ankhtsetseg Munkhjantsan	Weightlifting	
125	Mongolia	Mongolie	Tulga Tumur Ochir	Wrestling	
126	Montenegro	Monténégro	No athletes present for Closing Ceremony		
127	Mozambique	Mozambique	Tiago Muxanga	Boxing	
127	Mozambique	Mozambique	Deizy Nhaquile	Sailing	
128	Myanmar	Myanmar	Phone Pyae Han	Swimming	
128	Myanmar	Myanmar	Thuzar Thet Htar	Badminton	
129	Namibia	Namibie	Phillip Seidler	Swimming	
129	Namibia	Namibie	Helalia Johannes	Athletics	
130	Nauru	Nauru	Winzar Kakiouea	Athletics	
131	Nepal	Népal	Shantoshi Shrestha	Athletics	
132	Nicaragua	Nicaragua	María Carmona	Athletics	
133	Niger	Niger	Abdoul Razak Issoufou	Taekwondo	
133	Niger	Niger	Samira Awali Boubacar	Athletics	
134	Nigeria	Nigéria	Patience Okon George	Athletics	
135	Norway	Norvège	Solfrid Koanda	Weightlifting	
136	New Zealand	Nouvelle-Zélande	Finn Butcher	Canoeing	
136	New Zealand	Nouvelle-Zélande	Lisa Carrington	Canoeing	
137	Oman	Oman	No athletes present for Closing Ceremony		
138	Uganda	Ouganda	Oscar Chelimo	Athletics	
138	Uganda	Ouganda	Kathleen Noble	Rowing	
139	Uzbekistan	Ouzbékistan	Ulugbek Rashitov	Taekwondo	
140	Pakistan	Pakistan	Faiqa Riaz	Athletics	
141	Palau	Palaos	Yuri Hosei	Swimming	
141	Palau	Palaos	Jion Hosei	Swimming	
142	Palestine	Palestine	Omar Yaser Ismail	Taekwondo	
142	Palestine	Palestine	Valerie Tarazi	Swimming	
143	Panama	Panama	Arturo Deliser	Athletics	
143	Panama	Panama	Atheyna Bylon	Boxing	
144	Papua New Guinea	Papouasie-Nouvelle-Guinée	Kevin Kassman	Taekwondo	
144	Papua New Guinea	Papouasie-Nouvelle-Guinée	Leonie Beu	Athletics	
145	Paraguay	Paraguay	Gabriela Narváez	Judo	
146	Netherlands	Pays-Bas	Harrie Lavreysen	Cycling	
146	Netherlands	Pays-Bas	Femke Bol	Athletics	
147	Peru	Pérou	Stefano Peschiera	Sailing	
147	Peru	Pérou	María Belén Bazo	Sailing	
148	Philippines	Philippines	Carlos Edriel Yulo	Gymnastics	
148	Philippines	Philippines	Aira Villegas	Boxing	
149	Poland	Pologne	Wiktor Głazunow	Canoeing	
149	Poland	Pologne	Julia Szeremeta	Boxing	
150	Puerto Rico	Porto Rico	Luis Castro Rivera	Athletics	
151	Portugal	Portugal	Iúri Leitão	Cycling	
151	Portugal	Portugal	Patrícia Sampaio	Judo	
152	Qatar	Qatar	No athletes present for Closing Ceremony		
153	North Korea	République populaire démocratique de Corée	Ri Se-ung	Wrestling	
153	North Korea	République populaire démocratique de Corée	Kim Mi-rae	Diving	
154	Romania	Roumanie	Mihaela Valentina Cambei	Weightlifting	
155	Rwanda	Rwanda	Oscar Cyusa Peyre Mitilla	Swimming	
155	Rwanda	Rwanda	Clementine Mukandanga	Athletics	
156	Saint Kitts and Nevis	Saint-Kitts-et-Nevis	Naquille Harris	Athletics	
157	Saint Lucia	Sainte-Lucie	No athletes present for Closing Ceremony		
158	San Marino	Saint-Marin	Myles Nazem Amine	Wrestling	
158	San Marino	Saint-Marin	Giorgia Cesarini	Archery	
159	Saint Vincent and the Grenadines	Saint-Vincent-et-les-Grenadines	No athletes present for Closing Ceremony		
160	Solomon Islands	Îles Salomon	Sharon Firisua	Athletics	
161	Samoa	Samoa	Eroni Leilua	Sailing	
161	Samoa	Samoa	Samalulu Clifton	Canoeing	
162	American Samoa	Samoa américaines	Filomenaleonisa Iakopo	Athletics	
163	São Tomé and Príncipe	Sao Tomé-et-Principe	Roldeney de Oliveira	Judo	
163	São Tomé and Príncipe	Sao Tomé-et-Principe	Gorete Semedo	Athletics	
164	Senegal	Sénégal	Louis François Mendy	Athletics	
164	Senegal	Sénégal	Combe Seck	Canoeing	
165	Serbia	Serbie	Damir Mikec	Shooting	
165	Serbia	Serbie	Zorana Arunović	Shooting	
166	Seychelles	Seychelles	Dylan Sicobo	Athletics	
167	Sierra Leone	Sierra Leone	Joshua Wyse	Swimming	
168	Singapore	Singapour	Maximilian Maeder	Sailing	
168	Singapore	Singapour	Stephenie Chen	Canoeing	
169	Slovakia	Slovaquie	Tajmuraz Salkazanov	Wrestling	
169	Slovakia	Slovaquie	Viktória Forster	Athletics	
170	Slovenia	Slovénie	Toni Vodišek	Sailing	
170	Slovenia	Slovénie	Pia Babnik	Golf	
171	Somalia	Somalie	No athletes present for Closing Ceremony		
172	Sudan	Soudan	Yaseen Abdalla	Athletics	
173	South Sudan	Soudan du Sud	Abraham Guem	Athletics	
174	Sri Lanka	Sri Lanka	Viren Nettasinghe	Badminton	
174	Sri Lanka	Sri Lanka	Dilhani Lekamge	Athletics	
175	Sweden	Suède	Anton Dahlberg	Sailing	
175	Sweden	Suède	Tara Babulfath	Judo	
176	Switzerland	Suisse	Roman Mityukov	Swimming	
176	Switzerland	Suisse	Julie Derron	Triathlon	
177	Suriname	Suriname	Jaïr Tjon En Fa	Cycling	
178	Syria	République arabe syrienne	Man Asaad	Weightlifting	
179	Tajikistan	Tadjikistan	Davlat Boltaev	Boxing	
179	Tajikistan	Tadjikistan	Munira Abdusalomova	Taekwondo	
180	Chinese Taipei	Chinese Taipei	Yang Chun-han	Athletics	
180	Chinese Taipei	Chinese Taipei	Lin Yu-ting	Boxing	
181	Tanzania	République-Unie de Tanzanie	Alphonce Simbu	Athletics	
181	Tanzania	République-Unie de Tanzanie	Jackline Sakilu	Athletics	
182	Chad	Tchad	Valentin Betoudji	Athletics	
182	Chad	Tchad	Demos Memneloum	Judo	
183	Czech Republic	République tchèque	Martin Fuksa	Canoeing	
183	Czech Republic	République tchèque	Nikola Ogrodníková	Athletics	
184	Thailand	Thaïlande	Weeraphon Wichuma	Weightlifting	
184	Thailand	Thaïlande	Janjaem Suwannapheng	Boxing	
185	Timor-Leste	République démocratique du Timor-Leste	Manuel Ataide	Athletics	
185	Timor-Leste	République démocratique du Timor-Leste	Ana da Costa da Silva	Taekwondo	
186	Togo	Togo	Akoko Komlanvi	Rowing	
187	Tonga	Tonga	Maleselo Fufofuka	Athletics	
187	Tonga	Tonga	Fe'ofa'aki Epenisa	Boxing	
188	Trinidad and Tobago	Trinité-et-Tobago	Leah Bertrand	Athletics	
189	Tunisia	Tunisie	Karem Ben Hnia	Weightlifting	
189	Tunisia	Tunisie	Marwa Bouzayani	Athletics	
190	Turkey	Türkiye	Taha Akgül	Wrestling	
190	Turkey	Türkiye	Buse Naz Çakıroğlu	Boxing	
191	Turkmenistan	Turkménistan	Serdar Rahimov	Judo	
192	Tuvalu	Tuvalu	Karalo Maibuca	Athletics	
192	Tuvalu	Tuvalu	Temalini Manatoa	Athletics	
193	Ukraine	Ukraine	Parviz Nasibov	Wrestling	
193	Ukraine	Ukraine	Liudmyla Luzan	Canoeing	
194	Uruguay	Uruguay	Matías Otero	Canoeing	
194	Uruguay	Uruguay	Dolores Moreira	Sailing	
195	Vanuatu	Vanuatu	Hugo Cumbo	Judo	
195	Vanuatu	Vanuatu	Priscila Tommy	Table tennis	
196	Venezuela	Venezuela	Julio Mayora	Weightlifting	
196	Venezuela	Venezuela	Anyelin Venegas	Weightlifting	
197	Virgin Islands	Îles Vierges américaines	Eduardo Garcia	Athletics	
198	British Virgin Islands	Îles Vierges britanniques	Rikkoi Brathwaite	Athletics	
199	Vietnam	Viêt-Nam	No athletes present for Closing Ceremony		
200	Yemen	Yémen	Yusuf Marwan Abdullah Nasser	Swimming	
200	Yemen	Yémen	Yasameen Al-Raimi	Shooting	
201	Zambia	Zambie	Muzala Samukonga	Athletics	
202	Zimbabwe	Zimbabwe	Isaac Mpofu	Athletics	
202	Zimbabwe	Zimbabwe	Rutendo Nyahora	Athletics	
203	Australia	Australie	Matthew Wearn	Sailing	
203	Australia	Australie	Kaylee McKeown	Swimming	
204	United States	États-Unis d'Amérique	Nick Mead	Rowing	
204	United States	États-Unis d'Amérique	Katie Ledecky	Swimming	
205	France	France	Antoine Dupont	Rugby	
205	France	France	Pauline Ferrand-Prévot	Cycling	
