= Boxing at the 2024 Summer Olympics – Men's 63.5 kg =

Men's 63.5 kg at the Games of the XXXIII Olympiad
- Boxing pictogram
- Venue: Arena Paris Nord (preliminary); Stade Roland Garros (semifinals and finals)
- Dates: 27 July – 7 August 2024
- Competitors: 20 from 20 nations

Medalists
1st place, gold medalist(s)		Erislandy Álvarez	Cuba
2nd place, silver medalist(s)		Sofiane Oumiha	France
3rd place, bronze medalist(s)		Wyatt Sanford	Canada
3rd place, bronze medalist(s)		Lasha Guruli	Georgia

The men's 63.5 kg (lightweight) boxing event at the 2024 Summer Olympics took place between 27 July and 7 August 2024. Preliminary boxing matches occurred at Arena Paris Nord in Villepinte, with the medal rounds (semifinals and finals) staged at Stade Roland Garros.

== Background ==
This was the 27th appearance of the men's lightweight event. The event appeared at the first Olympic boxing tournament in 1904 and has been held at every Games with boxing (that is, excluding 1912) since. The maximum weight for the lightweight class had been 60 kg since 1952; for 2020, with the removal of the light-welterweight class, the lightweight class expanded from 56 to 60 kg to 57–63 kg.

Andy Cruz, the 2020 champion, did not participate. The only returning medalist was Harry Garside, but he lost in the round of 16. Erislandy Álvarez won the competition, becoming the Olympic champion. Sofiane Oumiha, who was also the 2016 silver medalist, won the silver medal, and Wyatt Sanford and Lasha Guruli became the bronze medalists.

== Qualification ==
Each NOC could send one boxer to the event.

- 4 places at 2023 European Games
- 1 place at 2023 African Boxing Olympic Qualification Tournament
- 2 places at 2022 Asian Games
- 2 places at 2023 Pan American Games
- 1 place at 2023 Pacific Games
- 4 places at World Qualifiers Round 1
- 5 places at World Qualifiers Round 2
- 1 universality place.

== Competition format ==
Like all Olympic boxing events, the competition was a straight single-elimination tournament. The competition began with a preliminary round, where the number of competitors was reduced to 16, and concluded with a final. As there were fewer than 32 boxers in the competition, a number of boxers received a bye through the preliminary round. Both semi-final losers were awarded bronze medals.

Bouts consisted of three three-minute rounds with a one-minute break between rounds. A boxer may win by knockout or by points. Scoring was on the "10-point-must," with five judges scoring each round. Judges consider "number of blows landed on the target areas, domination of the bout, technique and tactical superiority and competitiveness." Each judge determined a winner for each round, who received 10 points for the round, and assigned the round's loser a number of points between seven and nine based on performance. The judge's scores for each round were added to give a total score for that judge. The boxer with the higher score from a majority of the judges was the winner.

== Schedule ==
The schedule was as follows.

Legend

R32	Round of 32	R16	Round of 16	QF	Quarter-Finals	SF	Semi-Finals	F	Final

Jul 27	Jul 28	Jul 29	Jul 30	Jul 31	Aug 1	Aug 2	Aug 3	Aug 4	Aug 5	Aug 6	Aug 7
R32		R16			QF			SF			F

== Draw ==
The draw was held on 25 July 2024.

== Seeds ==
The seeds were released on 25 July 2024.

1. Wyatt Sanford (CAN) (semifinals)
2. Lai Chu-en (TPE) (round of 16)
3. Jugurtha Ait Bekka (ALG) (round of 16)
4. Sofiane Oumiha (FRA) (final)
5. Harry Garside (AUS) (round of 16)
6. Bunjong Sinsiri (THA) (quarterfinals)
7. Lasha Guruli (GEO) (semifinals)
8. Miguel Ángel Ramírez (MEX) (round of 16)

== Results ==
=== Finals ===
Final
7 August
Sofiane Oumiha (FRA)	2
Erislandy Álvarez (CUB)	3

=== Top half ===
Round of 32
27 July
Bakhodur Usmonov (TJK)	0
Radoslav Rosenov (BUL)	5
27 July
Obada Al-Kasbeh (JOR)	3
Dean Clancy (IRL)	2

Round of 16
29 July
Wyatt Sanford (CAN)	5
Radoslav Rosenov (BUL)	0
29 July
Ruslan Abdullaev (UZB)	5
Miguel Ángel Ramírez (MEX)	0
29 July
Harry Garside (AUS)	0
Richárd Kovács (HUN)	5
29 July
Obada Al-Kasbeh (JOR)	0
Sofiane Oumiha (FRA)	5

Quarterfinals
1 August
Wyatt Sanford (CAN)	4
Ruslan Abdullaev (UZB)	1
1 August
Richárd Kovács (HUN)	0
Sofiane Oumiha (FRA)	5

Semifinals
4 August
Wyatt Sanford (CAN)	1
Sofiane Oumiha (FRA)	4

=== Bottom half ===
Round of 32
27 July
Erislandy Álvarez (CUB)	RSC
John Ume (PNG)
27 July
Mukhammedsabyr Bazarbayuly (KAZ)	5
Oier Ibarreche (ESP)	0

Round of 16
29 July
Jugurtha Ait Bekka (ALG)	0
Erislandy Álvarez (CUB)	5
29 July
Jesús Cova (VEN)	0
Bunjong Sinsiri (THA)	5
29 July
Lasha Guruli (GEO)	5
Malik Hasanov (AZE)	0
29 July
Mukhammedsabyr Bazarbayuly (KAZ)	3
Lai Chu-en (TPE)	2

Quarterfinals
1 August
Erislandy Álvarez (CUB)	5
Bunjong Sinsiri (THA)	0
1 August
Lasha Guruli (GEO)	3
Mukhammedsabyr Bazarbayuly (KAZ)	2

Semifinals
4 August
Erislandy Álvarez (CUB)	5
Lasha Guruli (GEO)	0
