= Thailand at the 2024 Summer Olympics =

- IOC code: THA
- NOC: National Olympic Committee of Thailand
- Website: www.olympicthai.org (in Thai and English)

in Paris, France 28 July 2024 – 11 August 2024
- Competitors: 51 (24 men and 27 women) in 16 sports
- Flag bearers: Puripol Boonson & Vareeraya Sukasem
- Medals Ranked 44th: Gold 1 Silver 3 Bronze 2 Total 6

Summer Olympics appearances (overview)
- 1952; 1956; 1960; 1964; 1968; 1972; 1976; 1980; 1984; 1988; 1992; 1996; 2000; 2004; 2008; 2012; 2016; 2020; 2024

Thailand competed at the 2024 Summer Olympics in Paris. It is taking place from 26 July to 11 August 2024. It signified the nation's participation in every edition of the Summer Olympics, since the official debut at 1952, except for the 1980 Summer Olympics in Moscow, because of its support of the US-led boycott.

== Medalists ==
Medal	Name	Sport	Event	Date
Gold	Panipak Wongpattanakit	Taekwondo	Women's −49 kg	7 August
Silver	Kunlavut Vitidsarn	Badminton	Men's singles	5 August
Silver	Theerapong Silachai	Weightlifting	Men's −61 kg	7 August
Silver	Weeraphon Wichuma	Weightlifting	Men's −73 kg	8 August
Bronze	Janjaem Suwannapheng	Boxing	Women's Welterweight	6 August
Bronze	Surodchana Khambao	Weightlifting	Women's −49 kg	7 August

Medals by sport
Sport	1st place, gold medalist(s)	2nd place, silver medalist(s)	3rd place, bronze medalist(s)	Total
Taekwondo	1	0	0	1
Weightlifting	0	2	1	3
Badminton	0	1	0	1
Boxing	0	0	1	1
Total	1	3	2	6

Medals by day
Day	1st place, gold medalist(s)	2nd place, silver medalist(s)	3rd place, bronze medalist(s)	Total
27 July	0	0	0	0
28 July	0	0	0	0
29 July	0	0	0	0
30 July	0	0	0	0
31 July	0	0	0	0
1 August	0	0	0	0
2 August	0	0	0	0
3 August	0	0	0	0
4 August	0	0	0	0
5 August	0	1	0	1
6 August	0	0	1	1
7 August	1	1	1	3
8 August	0	1	0	1
9 August	0	0	0	0
10 August	0	0	0	0
11 August	0	0	0	0
Total	1	3	2	6

== Competitors ==
The following is the list of number of competitors in the Games.

Sport	Men	Women	Total
Athletics	1	1	2
Badminton	4	5	9
Boxing	3	5	8
Cycling	3	1	4
Equestrian	0	1	1
Golf	2	2	4
Judo	1	0	1
Modern pentathlon	1	0	1
Rowing	1	0	1
Sailing	2	2	4
Shooting	1	2	3
Skateboarding	0	1	1
Swimming	1	1	2
Table tennis	0	3	3
Taekwondo	1	2	3
Weightlifting	2	2	4
Total	24	27	51

== Athletics ==
Thai track and field athletes achieved the entry standards for Paris 2024 by world ranking, in the following events (a maximum of 3 athletes each):

Key

- Note–Ranks given for track events are within the athlete's heat only
- Q = Qualified for the next round
- q = Qualified for the next round as the fastest loser or, in field events, by position without achieving the qualifying target
- NR = National record
- N/A = Round not applicable for the event
- Bye = Athlete not required to compete in round

Track and road events

Athlete	Event	Heat		Repechage		Semifinal		Final	
Athlete	Event	Result	Rank	Result	Rank	Result	Rank	Result	Rank
Puripol Boonson	Men's 100 m	10.13	3 Q	—N/a		10.14	9	Did not advance	

Field events

Athlete	Event	Qualification		Final	
Athlete	Event	Distance	Position	Distance	Position
Subenrat Insaeng	Women's discus throw	58.07	30	Did not advance	

== Badminton ==
Thailand entered nine badminton players into the Olympic tournament based on the BWF Race to Paris Rankings.

Men

Athlete	Event	Group stage				Elimination	Quarter-final	Semi-final	Final / BM	
Athlete	Event	Opposition Score	Opposition Score	Opposition Score	Rank	Opposition Score	Opposition Score	Opposition Score	Opposition Score	Rank
Kunlavut Vitidsarn	Singles	Paul (MRI); W (21–9, 21–12)	Koljonen (FIN); W (21–4, 8–0) RET	—N/a	1 Q	Nishimoto (JPN); W (16–21, 21–14, 21–12)	Shi YQ (CHN); W (21–12, 21–10)	Lee Z J (MAS); W (21–14, 21–15)	Axelsen (DEN); L (11–21, 11–21)	2nd place, silver medalist(s)
Supak Jomkoh; Kittinupong Kedren	Doubles	C. Popov / T. Popov (FRA); W (21–14, 21–19)	Král / Mendrek (CZE); W (21–10, 21–13)	Kang M-h / Seo S-j (KOR); L (16–21, 15–21)	2 Q	—N/a	Lee Y / Wang C-l (TPE); L (14–21, 17–21)	Did not advance		

Women

Athlete	Event	Group stage				Elimination	Quarter-final	Semi-final	Final / BM	
Athlete	Event	Opposition Score	Opposition Score	Opposition Score	Rank	Opposition Score	Opposition Score	Opposition Score	Opposition Score	Rank
Ratchanok Intanon	Singles	Tan (BEL); W (21–8, 21–8)	Tai (TPE); W (21–19, 21–15)	—N/a	1 Q	Bye	Tunjung (INA); L (23–25, 9–21)	Did not advance		
Supanida Katethong	Singles	Vieira (BRA); W (21–16, 21–19)	Lo (HKG); W (21–14, 21–9)	—N/a	1 Q	Yamaguchi (JPN); L (6–21, 13–21)	Did not advance			
Jongkolphan Kititharakul; Rawinda Prajongjai	Doubles	Lambert / Tran (FRA); W (12–21, 21–13, 21–15)	Fruergaard / Thygesen (DEN); L (22–20, 21–23, 22–24)	Baek H-n / Lee S-h (KOR); L (9–21, 14–21)	3	Did not advance				

Mixed

Athlete	Event	Group stage				Quarter-final	Semi-final	Final / BM	
Athlete	Event	Opposition Score	Opposition Score	Opposition Score	Rank	Opposition Score	Opposition Score	Opposition Score	Rank
Dechapol Puavaranukroh; Sapsiree Taerattanachai	Doubles	Tabeling / Piek (NED); W (21–14, 21–16)	Mammeri / Mammeri (ALG); W (21–14, 21–9)	Seo S-j / Chae Y-j (KOR); L (16–21, 21–10, 15–21)	2 Q	Watanabe / Higashino (JPN); L (21–23, 14–21)	Did not advance		

== Boxing ==
Thailand entered eight boxers into the Olympic tournament. Thitisan Panmod (men's flyweight), Bunjong Sinsiri (men's lightweight), Chuthamat Raksat (women's flyweight), Thananya Somnuek (women's lightweight), and Janjaem Suwannapheng (women's welterweight) secured their quotas in their respective division by advancing to the semifinals at the 2022 Asian Games in Hangzhou, China; in addition, Jutamas Jitpong (women's bantamweight) secured the spot in their respective weight division by finishing in the top four at the 2024 World Boxing Olympic Qualification Tournament 1 in Busto Arsizio, Italy. Later on, Weerapon Jongjoho (men's middleweight) and Baison Manikon (women's middleweight) secured their spots following the triumph winning the quota bouts round, in their respective division, at the 2024 World Olympic Qualification Tournament 2 in Bangkok, Thailand.

Men

Athlete	Event	Round of 32	Round of 16	Quarterfinals	Semifinals	Final	
Athlete	Event	Opposition Result	Opposition Result	Opposition Result	Opposition Result	Opposition Result	Rank
Thitisan Panmod	Men's 51 kg	Bye	Varela de Pina (CPV); L 1–4	Did not advance			
Bunjong Sinsiri	Men's 63.5 kg	Bye	Cova (VEN); W 5–0	Álvarez (CUB); L 0–5	Did not advance		
Weerapon Jongjoho	Men's 80 kg	Pinales (DOM); L 0–5	Did not advance				

Women

Athlete	Event	Round of 32	Round of 16	Quarterfinals	Semifinals	Final	
Athlete	Event	Opposition Result	Opposition Result	Opposition Result	Opposition Result	Opposition Result	Rank
Chuthamat Raksat	Women's 50 kg	Bye	Bobokulova (UZB); W 5–0	Wu Yu (CHN); L 0–5	Did not advance		
Jutamas Jitpong	Women's 54 kg	Ćirković (SRB); W 4–1	Bertal (MAR); L 2–3	Did not advance			
Thananya Somnuek	Women's 60 kg	Sadiku (KOS); L 2–3	Did not advance				
Janjaem Suwannapheng	Women's 66 kg	Bye	Mbabi (COD); W 4–1	Sürmeneli (TUR); W 4–1	Khelif (ALG); L 0–5	Did not advance	3rd place, bronze medalist(s)
Baison Manikon	Women's 75 kg	—N/a	Michel (FRA); L 0–5	Did not advance			

== Cycling ==
=== Road ===
Thailand entered two riders to compete in the respective events. All the three quotas being obtained by virtue of the establishment of the UCI World Rankings.

Athlete	Event	Time	Rank
Thanakhan Chaiyasombat	Men's road race	DNF	—N/a
Phetdarin Somrat	Women's road race	4:13:42	78
Phetdarin Somrat	Women's time trial	47:25.11	34

=== Track ===
Thailand entered one rider for men's sprint and keirin events, based on the nations performances, through the final UCI Olympic rankings.

Sprint

Athlete	Event	Qualification		Round 1	Repechage 1	Round 2	Repechage 2	Round 3	Repechage 3	Quarterfinals	Semifinals	Finals / BM	
Athlete	Event	Time Speed (km/h)	Rank	Opposition Time Speed (km/h)	Opposition Time Speed (km/h)	Opposition Time Speed (km/h)	Opposition Time Speed (km/h)	Opposition Time Speed (km/h)	Opposition Time Speed (km/h)	Opposition Time Speed (km/h)	Opposition Time Speed (km/h)	Opposition Time Speed (km/h)	Rank
Jai Angsuthasawit	Men's sprint	9.898 (72.742)	27	Did not advance									

Keirin

Athlete	Event	Round 1	Repechage	Quarterfinals	Semifinals	Final
Athlete	Event	Rank	Rank	Rank	Rank	Rank
Jai Angsuthasawit	Men's keirin	4	3	Did not advance		

=== BMX ===
Race

Thai riders secured a single quota place in the men's BMX race for Paris 2024 by topping the field of nations vying for qualification at the 2023 Asian Championships in Tagaytay, Philippines.

Athlete	Event	Quarterfinal		Semifinal		Final	
Athlete	Event	Points	Rank	Points	Rank	Result	Rank
Komet Sukprasert	Men's race	23	23	Did not advance			

== Equestrian ==
Thailand entered one rider in the individual jumping event, through the establishments of final olympics ranking for Group G (South East Asia, Oceania).

=== Jumping ===
Athlete	Horse	Event	Qualification			Final		
Athlete	Horse	Event	Penalties	Time	Rank	Penalties	Time	Rank
Janakabhorn Karunayadhaj	Maxwin Kinmar Agalux	Jumping Individual	EL	—N/a	—N/a	Did not advance		

== Golf ==
Thailand entered four golfers into the Olympic tournament. All of them qualified directly for the games in the men's and women's individual competitions, based on their world ranking performance, on the IGF World Rankings.

Athlete	Event	Round 1	Round 2	Round 3	Round 4	Total		
Athlete	Event	Score	Score	Score	Score	Score	Par	Rank
Kiradech Aphibarnrat	Men's	74	73	72	71	290	+6	54
Phachara Khongwatmai	Men's	70	75	74	WD	—N/a	—N/a	—N/a
Atthaya Thitikul	Women's	72	69	69	76	286	−2	T18
Patty Tavatanakit	Women's	76	71	68	75	290	+2	T29

== Judo ==
Thailand entered one male judoka into the Olympic tournament based on the Asia Continental Quota.

Athlete	Event	Round of 32	Round of 16	Quarterfinals	Semifinals	Repechage	Final / BM	Rank
Athlete	Event	Opposition Result	Opposition Result	Opposition Result	Opposition Result	Opposition Result	Opposition Result	Rank
Masayuki Terada	Men's −73 kg	Metellus (HAI); W 11–0	Lombardo (ITA); L 0–1	Did not advance				

== Modern pentathlon ==
For the first time in summer Olympics edition, Thai modern pentathletes confirmed a single quota place for the Olympic games. Phurit Yohuang secured his spots in the men's event by virtue of top five eligible nation's through the 2022 Asian Games in Hangzhou, China.

Athlete	Event		Fencing (épée one touch)				Riding (show jumping)			Swimming (200 m freestyle)			Combined: shooting/running (10 m laser pistol)/(3000 m)			Total points	Final rank
Athlete	Event		RR	BR	Rank	MP points	Penalties	Rank	MP points	Time	Rank	MP points	Time	Rank	MP points	Total points	Final rank
Phurit Yohuang	Men's	Semifinal	12–23	2	16	187	55	18	245	2:02.18	8	306	11:03.33	17	637	1375	18
Phurit Yohuang	Men's	Final	12–23	Did not advance													

== Rowing ==
Thai rowers qualified one boats in the men's single sculls for the Games, through the 2024 Asia & Oceania Qualification Regatta in Chungju, South Korea.

Athlete	Event	Heats		Repechage		Quarterfinals		Semifinals		Final	
Athlete	Event	Time	Rank	Time	Rank	Time	Rank	Time	Rank	Time	Rank
Premanut Wattananusith	Men's single sculls	7:25.76	6 R	7:29.89	4 SE/F	Bye		7:48.78	3 FE	7:18.58	30

Qualification Legend: FA=Final A (medal); FB=Final B (non-medal); FC=Final C (non-medal); FD=Final D (non-medal); FE=Final E (non-medal); FF=Final F (non-medal); SA/B=Semifinals A/B; SC/D=Semifinals C/D; SE/F=Semifinals E/F; QF=Quarterfinals; R=Repechage

== Sailing ==
Thai sailors qualified one boat in each of the following classes through the 2022 Asian Games in Hangzhou, China, and 2023 Asian Championships in Chonburi, Thailand.

Elimination events

Athlete	Event	Race																				Final rank
Athlete	Event	1	2	3	4	5	6	7	QF	SF1	SF2	SF3	SF4	SF5	SF6	F1	F2	F3	F4	F5	F6	Final rank
Joseph Weston	Men's Formula Kite	19	17	17	11	19	17	17	—N/a	Did not advance												18
Benyapa Jantawan	Women's Formula Kite	17	19	16	18	DNC	DNS	—N/a	—N/a	Did not advance												19

Medal race events

Athlete	Event	Race										Net points	Final rank
Athlete	Event	1	2	3	4	5	6	7	8	9	M*	Net points	Final rank
Arthit Mikhail Romanyk	Men's ILCA 7	39	24	30	26	29	30	21	35	—N/a	EL	195	35
Sophia Montgomery	Women's ILCA 6	26	29	35	23	21	15	44	6	34	EL	189	27

M = Medal race; EL = Eliminated – did not advance into the medal race

== Shooting ==
Thai shooters achieved quota places for the following events based on their results at the 2022 and 2023 ISSF World Championships, 2023 and 2024 Asian Championships, and 2024 ISSF World Olympic Qualification Tournament.

Athlete	Event	Qualification		Final	
Athlete	Event	Points	Rank	Points	Rank
Thongphaphum Vongsukdee	Men's 50 m rifle 3 positions	578	39	Did not advance	
Kamonlak Saencha	Women's 10 m air pistol	564	36	Did not advance	
Kamonlak Saencha	Women's 25 m pistol	570	33	Did not advance	
Tanyaporn Prucksakorn	Women's 10 m air pistol	571	21	Did not advance	
Tanyaporn Prucksakorn	Women's 25 m pistol	580	19	Did not advance	

== Skateboarding ==
Thailand entered one female skateboarder to compete in the following event at the Games.

Athlete	Event	Qualification		Final	
Athlete	Event	Score	Rank	Score	Rank
Vareeraya Sukasem	Women's street	200.75	17	Did not advance	

== Swimming ==
Thailand sent two swimmers to compete at the 2024 Paris Olympics.

Athlete	Event	Heat		Semifinal		Final	
Athlete	Event	Time	Rank	Time	Rank	Time	Rank
Dulyawat Kaewsriyong	Men's 100 m freestyle	50.64	49	Did not advance			
Jenjira Srisaard	Women's 50 m freestyle	25.18	23	Did not advance			

== Table tennis ==
Thailand entered a full squad of female athletes into the Games. Thai women's senior team qualified by virtue of the results as the four highest team, not yet qualified, through the final ITTF teams ranking.

Women

Athlete	Event	Preliminary	Round 1	Round 2	Round 3	Round of 16	Quarterfinals	Semifinals	Final / BM	
Athlete	Event	Opposition Result	Opposition Result	Opposition Result	Opposition Result	Opposition Result	Opposition Result	Opposition Result	Opposition Result	Rank
Suthasini Sawettabut	Singles	—N/a	Bajor (POL); L 3–4	Did not advance						
Orawan Paranang	Singles	—N/a	Pesotska (UKR); L 3–4	Did not advance						
Suthasini Sawettabut; Orawan Paranang; Jinnipa Sawettabut	Team	—N/a				France; W 3–2	Japan; L 0–3	Did not advance		

== Taekwondo ==
Thailand qualified three athletes to compete at the games. Tokyo 2020 gold medalist, Panipak Wongpattanakit qualified for Paris 2024 by virtue of finishing within the top five in the Olympic rankings in her respective division. Meanwhile, Banlung Tubtimdang and Sasikarn Tongchan qualified for the games, after winning the semifinal rounds at the 2024 Asian Qualification Tournament in Tai'an, China.

Athlete	Event	Round of 16	Quarterfinals	Semifinals	Repechage	Final / BM	
Athlete	Event	Opposition Result	Opposition Result	Opposition Result	Opposition Result	Opposition Result	Rank
Banlung Tubtimdang	Men's −68 kg	Pérez Polo (ESP); L 0–2	Did not advance				
Panipak Wongpattanakit	Women's −49 kg	El-Bouchti (MAR); W 2–0	Abutaleb (KSA); W 2–0	Stojkovic (CRO); W 2–0	—N/a	Guo Q (CHN); W 2–1	1st place, gold medalist(s)
Sasikarn Tongchan	Women's −67 kg	Santos (BRA); W 2–0	Perisic (SRB); L 0–2	—N/a	Sobirjonova (UZB); L 1–2	Did not advance	

== Weightlifting ==
Thailand entered four weightlifters into the Olympic competition. Theerapong Silachai (men's 61 kg), Weeraphon Wichuma (men's 73 kg), Surodchana Khambao (women's 49 kg) and Duangaksorn Chaidee (women's +81 kg) secured one of the top ten slots in their respective weight divisions based on the IWF Olympic Qualification Rankings; marking the nations returning to the sport since the last participation at 2016.

Athlete	Event	Snatch		Clean & Jerk		Total	Rank
Athlete	Event	Result	Rank	Result	Rank	Total	Rank
Theerapong Silachai	Men's −61 kg	132	3	171	2	303	2nd place, silver medalist(s)
Weeraphon Wichuma	Men's −73 kg	148	9	198 JWR	2	346	2nd place, silver medalist(s)
Surodchana Khambao	Women's −49 kg	88	4	112	2	200	3rd place, bronze medalist(s)
Duangaksorn Chaidee	Women's +81 kg	120	5	152	6	272	6
