= Bunjong Sinsiri =

Thai boxer

Personal information
- Nickname: Lat
- Nationality: Thailand
- Born: 2 October 1992 (age 33) Khun Han, Sisaket, Thailand
- Height: 173 cm (5 ft 8 in)

Boxing career
- Stance: Southpaw
Medal record
Boxing
Representing Thailand
Asian Games
Bronze medal – third place	2022 Hangzhou	Lightweight
Asian Amateur Boxing Championships
Gold medal – first place	2022 Amman	Welterweight
Bronze medal – third place	2024 Chiang Mai	Welterweight
Thailand Open Boxing
Gold medal – first place	2022 Thailand Open	Welterweight
SEA Games
Gold medal – first place	2021 Hanoi	Welterweight
Gold medal – first place	2023 Phnom Penh	Welterweight
Gold medal – first place	2025 Bangkok	Welterweight

Bunjong Sinsiri (Thai: บรรจง สินศิริ, pronounced [ban˧.t͡ɕoŋ sinsi˨˩.ri], born 2 October 1992) is a Thai boxer who competed in the 2024 Summer Olympics in the men's 63.5 kg (lightweight) category.

He qualified because Baatarsükhiin Chinzorig the Mongolian boxer who beat him failed a doping test in the 2022 Asian Games.

In the 2024 Summer Olympics, his first Summer Olympics, in the first stage (round of 32), he was drawn to advance to the next stage. In the second stage (round of 16), he narrowly beat Jesús Cova from Venezuela 2–3.

In the quarterfinals (round of 8), he lost to the Cuban Erislandy Álvarez in a 5–0 defeat.

At the 2026 Asian Games, he moved up to compete in the 70 kg (light-middleweight) category and was eliminated in the first stage (round of 32) after losing to Sumit Kundu of India over three rounds.

== See also ==
- Boxing at the 2024 Summer Olympics – Qualification
