= Jesús Cova =

Venezuelan boxer

Jesús Nazaret Cova Romero
Personal information
- National team: Venezuela
- Born: 2000 (age 25–26)

Sport
- Sport: Boxing
- Weight class: Men's 63.5 kg

Jesús Nazaret Cova Romero (born c. 2000) is a Venezuelan boxer. At the 2024 Summer Olympics, Cova competed for Venezuela in the men's 63.5kg (lightweight) division, where he lost by unanimous decision to Sinsiri Bunjong. Cova qualified for the Olympics by defeating Saparmyrat Odajev of Turkmenistan in the Olympic qualifying tournament in Busto Arsizio, Italy.
