= Richárd Kovács =

Hungarian boxer (born 1997)

Personal information
- Nationality: Hungarian
- Born: 9 November 1997 (age 28) Nyíregyháza, Hungary
- Height: 1.76 m (5 ft 9 in)
- Weight: Lightweight

Boxing career
- Stance: Orthodox

Boxing record
- Total fights: 0
- Wins: 0
- Win by KO: 0
- Losses: 0
Medal record
Men's amateur boxing
Representing Hungary
European Games
Bronze medal – third place	2023 Kraków-Małopolska	Light welterweight
European Championships
Bronze medal – third place	2022 Yerevan	Light welterweight
Bronze medal – third place	2024 Belgrade	Light welterweight

Richárd Kovács (born 9 November 1997) is a Hungarian boxer who competed in the 63.5kg class at the 2024 Summer Olympics.

== Career ==
Kovács is a five-time Hungarian light welterweight champion, winning the title in 2017 and 2019–2022.

He represented Hungary at the 2017, 2021 and 2023 World Championships, being eliminated in the Round of 16 in each attempt.

He won bronze at the 2022 European Championships and 2023 European Games, earning a spot at the 2024 Summer Olympics in the 63.5kg class, where he defeated 2020 Summer Olympics bronze medalist Harry Garside in the Round of 16, before being eliminated in the Quarter Finals against eventual silver medalist French boxer Sofiane Oumiha.

== Personal life ==
Kovács lives in his hometown of Nyíregyháza with his wife and son.
