= Wyatt Sanford =

Canadian boxer (born 1998)

Personal information
- Born: November 3, 1998 (age 27) Kennetcook, Nova Scotia, Canada
- Home town: Montreal, Quebec
- Height: 173 cm (5 ft 8 in)
- Weight: 63.5 kg (140 lb)
Medal record
Men's boxing
Representing Canada
Olympic Games
Bronze medal – third place	2024 Paris	63.5 kg
Pan American Games
Gold medal – first place	2023 Santiago	63.5 kg
Commonwealth Games
Bronze medal – third place	2022 Birmingham	63.5 kg
Pan American Championships
Bronze medal – third place	2022 Guayaquil	63.5 kg

Wyatt Sanford (born November 3, 1998) is a Canadian professional boxer. As an amateur he competed in the 63.5 kg weight category (welterweight). where he won a gold medal at the 2023 Pan American Games and bronze at the 2024 Summer Olympics.

== Amateur career ==
In 2019, Sanford competed at the 2019 AIBA World Boxing Championships. Sanford finished in the top 16, losing to the eventual gold medalist Andrey Zamkovoy of Russia in round 3. In June 2021, Sanford was named to Canada's 2020 Olympic team. Sanford qualified as the highest ranked boxer from the Americas not yet qualified.

At the 2022 Pan American Championships in Ecuador, went down a category to the 63.5 kg event, winning bronze. In May 2022, Sanford was named to Canada's 2022 Commonwealth Games team where he won a bronze medal.

Sanford won the gold medal at the 2023 Pan American Games in Santiago by unanimous decision. After his win he noted that he needed a gold medal to keep up with his wife Pamela Ware who won two at those games. He said of the couples' medals that "getting the gold medal is a huge accomplishment; super happy. I needed at least one to keep up. Super proud of her; she did absolutely amazing. Just overall great performance from both of us at the Pan Am Games."

In July 2024, Sanford was named to his second Olympic team. At the Olympics, Sanford would win bronze, following a semifinal loss on points to subsequent silver medallist Sofiane Oumiha of France, becoming Canada's first Olympic boxing medallist in 28 years.

== Professional career ==
Sanford turned professional in January 2025. He was due to make his pro-debut against Shawn Archer in Montreal on 10 April 2025, but the bout was canceled due to a medical issue affecting his opponent.

He is scheduled to make his debut in a four-round junior welterweight bout against Gonzalo Omar Manriquez at the Fredericton Coliseum in New Brunswick on 17 May 2025.

== Personal life ==
Sanford is married to Canadian Olympic diver Pamela Ware.
