= Boxing at the 2022 Asian Games – Women's 66 kg =

Boxing competitions

Women's 66 kg at the 2022 Asian Games
- Venue: Hangzhou Gymnasium
- Date: 25 September – 5 October 2023
- Competitors: 13 from 13 nations

Medalists
gold medal	Yang Liu	China
silver medal	Janjaem Suwannapheng	Thailand
bronze medal	Natalya Bogdanova	Kazakhstan
bronze medal	Chen Nien-chin	Chinese Taipei

The women's 66 kilograms event at the 2018 Asian Games took place from 25 September to 5 October 2023 at Hangzhou Gymnasium, Hangzhou, China.

The competition was a straight single-elimination tournament. Both semifinal losers were awarded bronze medals.

== Schedule ==
All times are China Standard Time (UTC+08:00)

Date	Time	Event
Monday, 25 September 2023	14:00	Preliminaries – R16
Sunday, 1 October 2023	14:00	Quarterfinals
Wednesday, 4 October 2023	19:00	Semifinals
Thursday, 5 October 2023	19:00	Final

== Results ==
Legend

- RSC — Won by referee stop contest
- RSCI — Won by referee stop contest injury

Preliminaries – R16
Ragad Al-Naimi (KSA)
Natalya Bogdanova (KAZ)	RSC
Janjaem Suwannapheng (THA)	5
Navbakhor Khamidova (UZB)	0
Seon Su-jin (KOR)	5
Mai Kito (JPN)	0
Yang Liu (CHN)	5
Arundhati Choudhary (IND)	0
Chen Nien-chin (TPE)	RSC
Binita Thapa Magar (NEP)

Quarterfinals
Myagmarsürengiin Tsetsegdari (MGL)	0
Natalya Bogdanova (KAZ)	5
Janjaem Suwannapheng (THA)	5
Seon Su-jin (KOR)	0
Hwang Hyo-sun (PRK)	0
Yang Liu (CHN)	5
Chen Nien-chin (TPE)	RSCI
Shoira Zulkaynarova (TJK)

Semifinals
Natalya Bogdanova (KAZ)
Janjaem Suwannapheng (THA)	RSC
Yang Liu (CHN)	3
Chen Nien-chin (TPE)	2

Final
Janjaem Suwannapheng (THA)	0
Yang Liu (CHN)	5
