= Steve Kulenguluka =

Democratic Republic of the Congo boxer (born 2001)

Personal information
- Nationality: Congolese
- Born: 11 May 2001 (age 25) Kinshasa, Democratic Republic of the Congo
- Height: 1.83 m (6 ft 0 in)
- Weight: Middleweight

Boxing career

Boxing record
- Total fights: 8
- Wins: 8
- Win by KO: 7
- Losses: 0
Medal record
Men's amateur boxing
Representing Democratic Republic of the Congo
African Games
Gold medal – first place	2024 Accra	Welterweight

Steve Kulenguluka Mbiya (born 11 May 2001) is a Congolese professional boxer. As an amateur he won a gold medal in the men's welterweight event at the 2023 African Games.

== Professional boxing record ==
8 fights	8 wins	0 losses
By knockout	7	0
By decision	1	0

No.	Result	Record	Opponent	Type	Round, time	Date	Location	Notes
8	Win	8-0	(Zimbabwe) Tranos Zihove	TKO	2 (8)	28 Jun 2025	Nkana Stadium, Kitwe, Zambia	
7	Win	7-0	(Democratic Republic of the Congo) Lingomba Madingolo	KO	3 (8) 2:25	12 Mar 2025	(Republic of the Congo) Champion Academy d'Oyo, Oyo, Congo	
6	Win	6-0	(Democratic Republic of the Congo) Sedou Kanyanya	RTD	5 (6) 3:00	29 Nov 2024	(Republic of the Congo) Point Noire Hotel, Brazzaville, Congo	
5	Win	5-0	(Kenya) Kennedy Opiyo	TKO	2 (6)	21 Sep 2024	Charter Hall, Nairobi, Kenya	
4	Win	4-0	(Democratic Republic of the Congo) Madjongo Monzemba	TKO	3 (6)	4 Aug 2024	(Democratic Republic of the Congo) Salle Libérale, Kinshasa, DR Congo	
3	Win	3-0	(Malawi) Roy Yudah	TKO	1 (4) 2:30	22 Jun 2024	HuaLien Club, Quatre Bornes, Mauritius	
2	Win	2-0	(Democratic Republic of the Congo) Ilunga Ali	TKO	2 (4)	16 Jul 2023	(Democratic Republic of the Congo) Centre Culturel De Lemba, Kinshasa, DR Congo	
1	Win	1-0	(Democratic Republic of the Congo) Nzuanga Lieven Matondo	UD	4	17 May 2022	(Democratic Republic of the Congo) Village Chez Ntemba, Kinshasa, DR Congo	
