= Dmytro Lovchynskyi =

Ukrainian boxer (born 1999)

Dmytro Lovchynskyi Дмитро Павлович Ловчинський
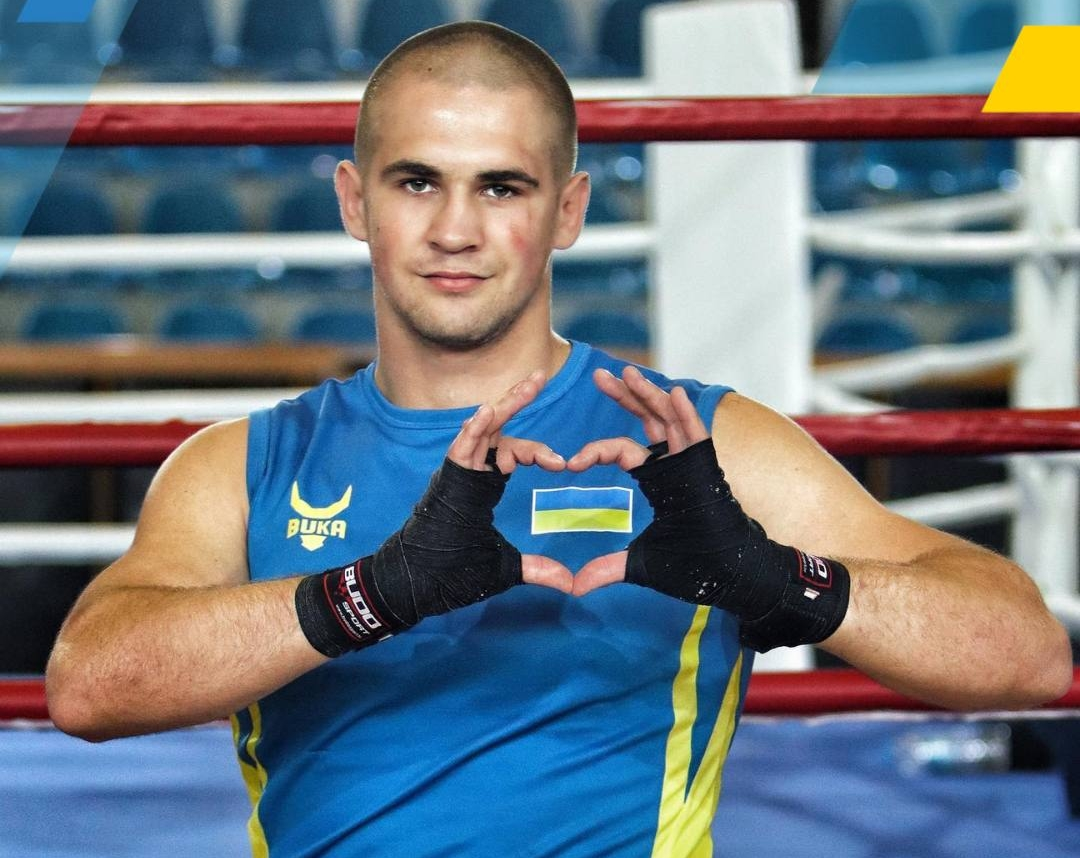

Personal information
- Nationality: Ukrainian
- Born: 5 February 1999 (age 27) Brovary, Ukraine
- Weight: Super Heavyweight

Boxing career

Boxing record
- Total fights: 1
- Wins: 1
- Win by KO: 1
- Losses: 0

Dmytro Lovchynskyi (Ukrainian: Дмитро Павлович Ловчинський; born 5 February 1999 in Brovary, Ukraine) is a Ukrainian amateur boxer. He is set to represent Ukraine at the 2024 Summer Olympics. He is 2022 and 2023 Ukrainian champion.

Lovchynskyi competed at the 2023 European Games, where he lost in the round of 16 to Spanish Ayoub Ghadfa.

In 2024, he competed for an Olympic quota. At the World Olympic Qualification Tournament 1, he lost in the very first bout to Croatian Luka Pratljačić. But at the World Olympic Qualification Tournament 2, he defeated 2023 African Games champion Ifeanyi Onyekwere from Nigeria, once again met Pratljačić defeating him and finally won against Stylianos Roulias from Greece, thus obtaining a quota.

In January 2024, he won in his category at the 68th Bocskai Memorial Tournament in Debrecen.

== Personal life ==
Lovchinskyi graduated from Hryhorii Skovoroda University in Pereiaslav.
