= Alyssa Mendoza =

American boxer (born 2003)

Personal information
- Nickname: Wrecking Machine
- Born: August 17, 2003 (age 23) Boise, Idaho, U.S.
- Weight: Featherweight

Boxing career
- Stance: Southpaw

Boxing record
- Total fights: 51
- Wins: 39
- Win by KO: 11
- Losses: 12

Alyssa Mendoza (born August 17, 2003) is an American boxer. She qualified to represent the United States at the 2024 Summer Olympics.

== Biography ==
Mendoza was born on August 17, 2003. She grew up in Caldwell, Idaho, and attended Middleton High School. Her father, JR, runs a gym and is a boxing trainer, and in 2015, at age 12, she first began training in the sport with him. Within a month, she fought her first bout and won, and by the age of 16, she had compiled a record of 28–12.

In December 2019, Mendoza competed at the U.S. youth national championship and won the title in her weight class, earning her a spot on the youth national team. She became the first female from Idaho to accomplish the feat. She qualified for the 2020 World Youth Championships in Poland, but did not compete as the games were canceled due to the COVID-19 pandemic.

Mendoza placed third at the USA Boxing Elite National Championships in 2021 and then won the tournament in 2022. She also competed at a Golden Gloves tournament in 2022 and won the event on her birthday, while being named the competition's best female boxer. In 2023, she won medals at three international events and participated at the Pan American Games. She was also named to the Elite High Performance Team by USA Boxing.

Mendoza participated in the first 2024 Olympic Qualification Tournament and was narrowly defeated in the match that would have qualified her for the 2024 Summer Olympics. She then competed at the second Olympic Qualification Tournament and won the finals by unanimous decision, making her the eighth and last person to qualify on the U.S. boxing team. By qualifying, she became the first Olympic boxer in her state's history.

She won in her Olympic debut by split decision (3–2) against Mijgona Samadova of Tajikistan in the round of 16.
