= Janjaem Suwannapheng =

Thai amateur boxer (born 2000

Personal information
- Nickname: Bee
- Born: 25 September 2000 (age 26) Fao Rai, Nong Khai, Thailand
- Height: 170 cm (5 ft 7 in)

Boxing career
- Weight class: Welterweight
- Stance: Orthodox
Medal record
Women's amateur boxing
Representing Thailand
Summer Olympics
Bronze medal – third place	2024 Paris	Welterweight
World Championships
Silver medal – second place	2023 New Delhi	Welterweight
Asian Games
Silver medal – second place	2022 Hangzhou	Welterweight
SEA Games
Gold medal – first place	2023 Cambodia	Light middleweight
Gold medal – first place	2025 Thailand	Welterweight

Janjaem Suwannapheng (Thai: จันทร์แจ่ม สุวรรณเพ็ง; born 25 September 2000) is a Thai amateur boxer. She won a medal at the 2023 AIBA Women's World Boxing Championships.

== Early life ==
A native of Nong Khai, a small province bordering Laos across the Mekong, Suwannapheng began boxing at 12 with Muay Thai, as her family owned a gym. She also joined her high school's boxing club. Fighting under the name "Nongbee Por.Prasith" (น้องบี ป.ประสิทธิ์), she won seven straight bouts before running out of opponents and switching to amateur boxing, coached by her high school teacher, Chartsuphong Phulad.

She earned a place on the national team while in grade 12, though her mother still doubted she was truly a national athlete. Upon graduation, her mother accepted her diploma because she was away training.

== 2024 Summer Olympics ==
Suwannapheng represented Thailand at the 2024 Summer Olympics in the women's boxing 66 kg (welterweight) category.

In the second stage (round of 16), she defeated Brigitte Mbabi from the Democratic Republic of the Congo 4–1. In the first round, she was hit by a right hook and fell to her knees for the referee's eight count. In the quarter-finals (round of 8), she defeated Turkish number one seed Busenaz Sürmeneli 4–1.

Suwannapheng lost to Algerian Imane Khelif 0–5 in the semi-finals (round of 4). She was counted eight by the referee in the third round, giving her the bronze medal. She is the only Thai boxer to capture a medal at this Olympics.

== Personal life ==
She is currently serving in the Air Force Welfare Department, Royal Thai Air Force (RTAF) with the rank of Female Pilot Officer (Plt.Off.).
