= Marine Camara =

Malian boxer (born 1995)

Personal information
- Nationality: (Mali) Malian
- Born: Marine Fatoumata Colette Camara; 28 January 1995 (age 31)

Sport
- Sport: Boxing
- Weight class: Featherweight
Medal record
Women's amateur boxing
Representing Mali
African Games
Silver medal – second place	2019 Rabat	57kg

Marine Camara (born 28 January 1995) is a Malian boxer. She became the first woman representing Mali to win an African Games boxing medal when she claimed silver in the 57kg division at the 2019 edition. Camara is also the first female Malian boxer to take part in an Olympic Games, having competed in the 57kg category at the 2024 Paris Games. She lost in the first round to eventual bronze medalist, Esra Yıldız, from Turkey. Camara was one of her country's flag-bearers at both the opening and closing ceremonies at the event.
