= Fátima Herrera =

Mexican boxer (born 2001)

Personal information
- Full name: Fátima Patricia Herrera Álvarez
- Born: 12 November 2001 (age 24) San Luis Potosí
- Height: 1.57 m (5 ft 2 in)

Sport
- Sport: Boxing
Medal record
Women's boxing
Representing Mexico
Pan American Boxing Championships
| Silver medal – second place | 2022 Guayaquil | -52 kg |

Fátima Patricia Herrera Álvarez (born 12 November 2001) is a Mexican boxer. Herrera began boxing at age 7, inspired by her brother. She represented Mexico at the 2024 Summer Olympics, qualifying after defeating Canadian Mckenzie Wright at the Olympic qualifying tournament in Bangkok. In the women's 50kg boxing event, Herrera defeated Laura Fuertes of Spain in the Round of 32 but lost to Buse Naz Çakıroğlu of Turkey in the Round of 16.
