= Damian Durkacz =

Polish boxer (born 1999)

Personal information
- Nationality: Polish
- Born: 30 January 1999 (age 26)

Sport
- Sport: Boxing

Damian Durkacz (born 30 January 1999) is a Polish boxer. He competed in the men's lightweight event at the 2020 Summer Olympics.
