= Ivanusa Moreira =

Cape Verdean boxer (born 1988)

Ivanusa Gomes Moreira (born 11 November 1988), also known as Nancy Moreira, is a Cape Verdean boxer. She began competing in the sport at the age of 23. Moreira placed fifth in the welterweight division at the 2022 IBA Women's World Boxing Championships and won gold at the 2023 African Boxing Championships. Her lack of sponsorship meant she had to rely on a bank loan to participate in the event. She represented Cape Verde at the 2024 Summer Olympics, qualifying via universality placement after losing to Congolese boxer Brigitte Mbabi in the qualifying tournament. Competing the women's 66kg boxing tournament, Moreira lost to Belgian Oshin Derieuw in the round of 16. Moreira is an ambassador for the Gender Equality in Sport campaign, and was part of a bid to make Matosinhos the European City of Sport 2025.
