= Aidan Walsh (boxer) =

Irish boxer (born 1997)

Personal information
- Nationality: Irish
- Born: 28 March 1997 (age 29) Belfast, Northern Ireland, U.K.
- Height: 180 cm (5 ft 11 in)
- Weight: welterweight

Boxing career
- Stance: Switch
Medal record
Representing Ireland
Olympic Games
Bronze medal – third place	2020 Tokyo	Welterweight
Representing Northern Ireland
Commonwealth Youth Games
Gold medal – first place	2015 Apia	light welterweight
Commonwealth Games
Silver medal – second place	2018 Gold Coast	welterweight
Gold medal – first place	2022 Birmingham	Men's light middleweight

Aidan Walsh (born 28 March 1997) is an Irish boxer.

Walsh trains at Holy Family ABC, Belfast. His sister is Olympic boxer Michaela Walsh.

In 2015, Aidan won gold at light welterweight at the Commonwealth Youth Games.

At welterweight, Aidan won silver at the 2018 Commonwealth Games. Aidan also competed in the 2022 Commonwealth Games in Birmingham where he won Gold alongside his sister Michaela Walsh, who is also a champion amateur boxer.

Walsh competed in the men's welterweight competition at the Tokyo 2020 Olympics and won a bronze medal.

He lost in the first round at the 2024 Summer Olympics in Paris, going down 4:0 to Makan Traoré from France.
