= Malik Hasanov =

Azerbaijani boxer (1998)

Personal information
- Native name: Malik Həsənov
- Born: 30 April 1998 (age 28)
- Height: 1.85 m (6 ft 1 in)

Sport
- Sport: Boxing

Malik Hasanov (born 30 April 1998) is an Azerbaijani boxer who competes in the men's 63.5 kg weight category. He has represented Azerbaijan at multiple international competitions, including the 2023 European Games and the 2024 Summer Olympics.

== Biography ==
Malik Hasanov was born on 30 April 1998 in Mingachevir, Azerbaijan. He began boxing in his hometown and developed his career under the guidance of coach Rafig Ismayilov.

In 2023, Hasanov competed at the European Games in Kraków, Poland, where he placed ninth in the men's 63.5 kg category. The following year, he claimed a bronze medal at the European Boxing Championships and won the World Qualification Tournament held in Bangkok, Thailand, earning a qualification in the 2024 Summer Olympics in Paris. Competing in Olympics, Hasanov reached the Round of 16 in the men's 63.5 kg boxing event before being eliminated.

Malik Hasanov is a member of the Neftchi Club in Baku.
