= Feʻofaʻaki Epenisa =

Tongan boxer (born 1996)

Personal information
- Born: 2 April 1996 (age 30) Vavaʻu, Tonga

Sport
- Sport: Boxing
- Weight class: Middleweight, Featherweight, Lightweight
Medal record
Women's amateur boxing
Representing Tonga
Pacific Games
Silver medal – second place	2023 Honiara	57kg
Bronze medal – third place	2019 Savaii	75kg

Feʻofaʻaki Epenisa (born 2 April 1996) is a Tongan boxer. She is the first female boxer from Tonga to take part in an Olympic Games. Epenisa lost to Vietnam's Hà Thị Linh in the 60 kg division round-of-32 at the 2024 Summer Olympics. She was also one of Tonga's flag-bearers at the closing ceremony.
