= Erislandy Álvarez =

Cuban boxer (born 2000)

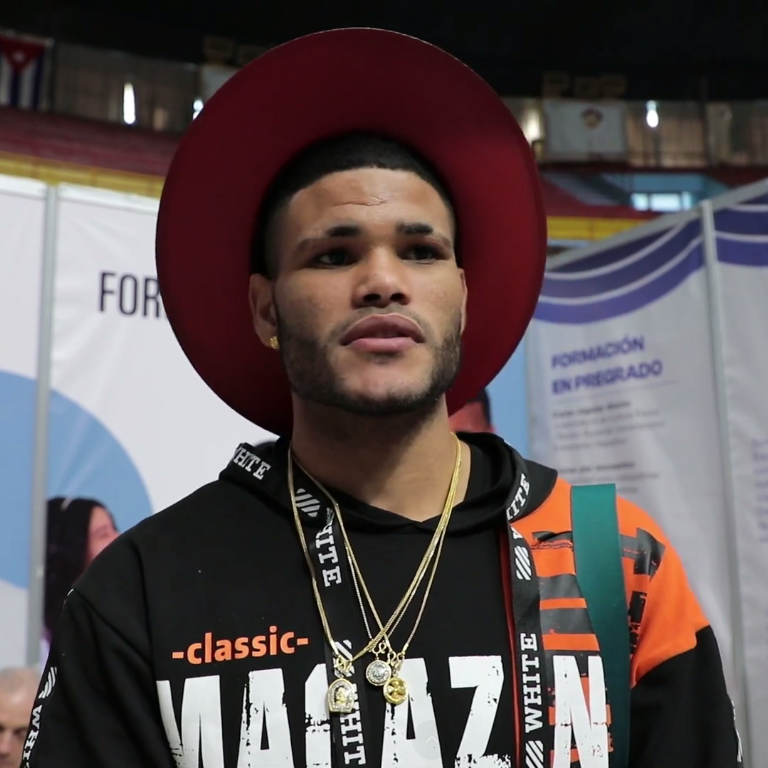
- Álvarez in 2025

Personal information
- Nickname: La Amenaza
- Born: Erislandy Álvarez Borges; 14 July 2000 (age 25) Cienfuegos, Cuba
- Height: 1.68 m (5 ft 6 in)
- Weight: Lightweight, Light-welterweight

Boxing career
- Stance: Orthodox
Medal record
Men's amateur boxing
Representing Cuba
Olympic Games
Gold medal – first place	2024 Paris	Lightweight
World Championships
Bronze medal – third place	2025 Liverpool	65 kg

Erislandy Álvarez (born 14 July 2000) is a Cuban boxer. He won the gold medal in the lightweight division at the 2024 Summer Olympics and a bronze medal in the light-welterweight category at the 2025 World Championships.
