= Brigitte Mbabi =

Congolese boxer (born 2002)

Brigette Mbabi (born 4 May 2002 ) is a boxer from the Democratic Republic of the Congo. She competed at the 2024 Summer Olympics in the women's welterweight division, losing to Thailand's Janjaem Suwannapheng by judge's decision.
