= Artur Bazeyan =

Armenian boxer (born 2000)

Personal information
- Nationality: Armenian
- Born: 26 October 2000 (age 25) Gavar, Armenia
- Weight: Featherweight; Lightweight

Boxing career

Boxing record
- Total fights: 2
- Wins: 2
- Win by KO: 1
Medal record
Men's amateur boxing
Representing Armenia
IBA World Championships
Bronze medal – third place	2025 Dubai	Lightweight
European Championships
Silver medal – second place	2022 Yerevan	Featherweight
Bronze medal – third place	2024 Belgrade	Featherweight

Artur Bazeyan (born 26 October 2000) is an Armenian professional boxer. As an amateur, he is a two-time medalist at the European Amateur Boxing Championships and bronze medalist at the IBA Men's World Boxing Championships.

== Amateur career ==
Bazeyan competed at the 2021 AIBA World Boxing Championships, in the featherweight category, where he lost to Osvel Caballero in the third round.

In May 2022, Bazeyan was named to the Armenian squad for the 2022 European Amateur Boxing Championships. Competing in the featherweight division, he reached the finals, where he lost to Vasile Usturoi in the gold medal match.

Bazeyan also competed at the 2023 IBA Men's World Boxing Championships, once again in the featherweight category, where he lost to Yousef Iashash in the round of 16. He also competed in the European Games in Kraków in the same category, where he reached the quarterfinals and lost to Javier Ibáñez.

In 2024, Bazeyan competed in the featherweight division at the 2024 World Boxing Olympic Qualification Tournament 1 and 2. Between these tournaments, he competed in the European Championships, where he won a bronze medal after losing to Eduard Savvin in the semifinals.

Bazeyan competed in the lightweight category at the 2025 IBA Men's World Boxing Championships in Dubai, United Arab Emirates. In his first three rounds, he defeated Abdoul Karim Bathily, Ebenezer Ankrah, and Matvejs Prokudins, all by unanimous decision. In the semi-final, Bazeyan lost to Abdumalik Khalokov by unanimous decision, winning a bronze medal.

== Professional career ==
In his professional debut, Bazeyan faced Victor Vacula at the Karen Demirchyan Sports Complex in Yerevan, Armenia on 26 October 2024. After six rounds, he won the bout by TKO.

Bazeyan faced Ardit Murja in Yerevan on 17 January 2025. After six rounds, he won the bout by unanimous decision.

== Professional boxing record ==
2 fights	2 wins	0 losses
By knockout	1	0
By decision	1	0

No.	Result	Record	Opponent	Type	Round, time	Date	Location	Notes
2	Win	2–0	Ardit Murja	UD	6	17 January 2025	Karen Demirchyan Sports Complex, Yerevan, Armenia	
1	Win	1–0	Victor Vacula	TKO	6 (6), 0:46	26 October 2024	Karen Demirchyan Sports Complex, Yerevan, Armenia	
