= Boxing at the 2024 Summer Olympics – Men's 57 kg =

Men's 57 kg at the Games of the XXXIII Olympiad
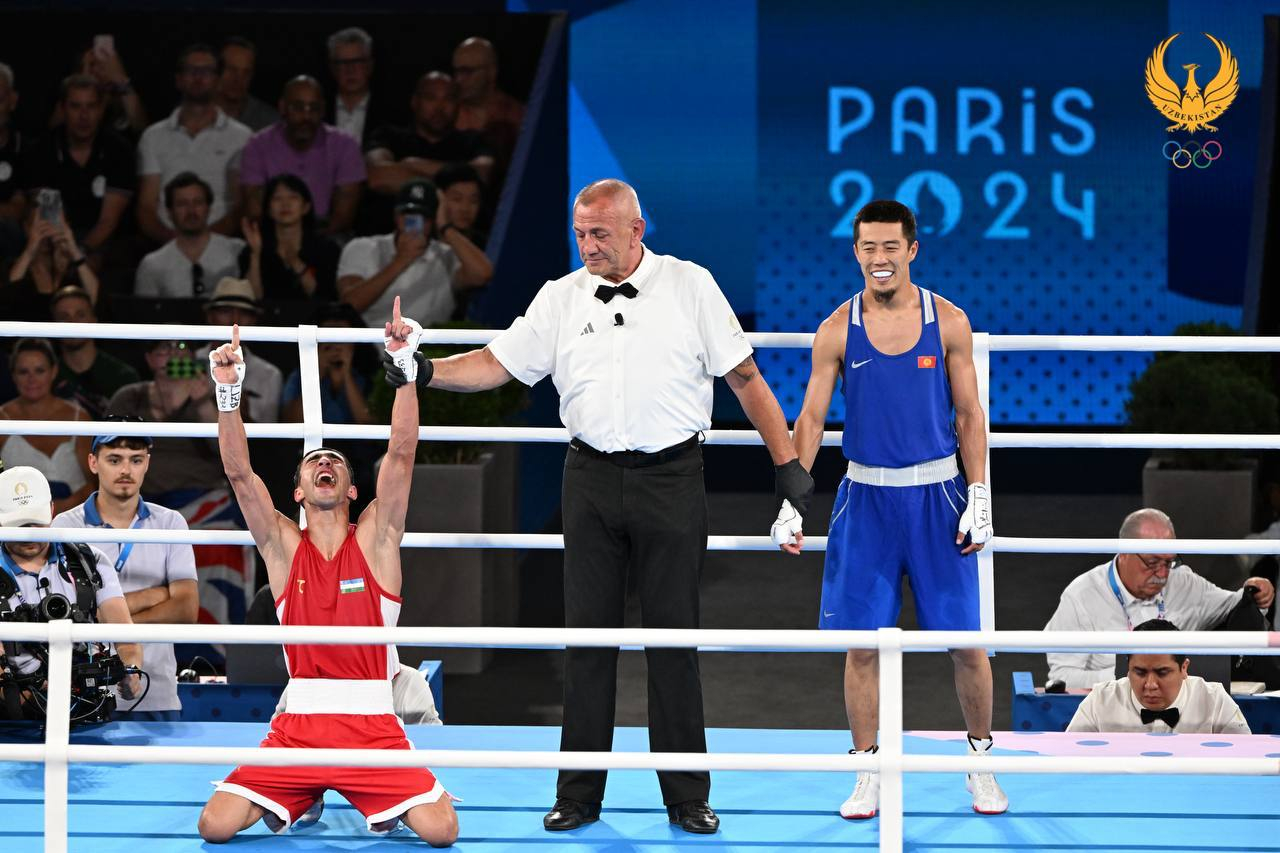
- Referee Holger Kussmaul raises Khalokov's hand after the judges declare him the winner in the gold medal bout
- Venue: Arena Paris Nord (preliminary); Stade Roland Garros (semifinals and finals)
- Dates: 28 July – 10 August 2024
- Competitors: 17 from 17 nations

Medalists
1st place, gold medalist(s)		Abdumalik Khalokov	Uzbekistan
2nd place, silver medalist(s)		Munarbek Seitbek Uulu	Kyrgyzstan
3rd place, bronze medalist(s)		Charlie Senior	Australia
3rd place, bronze medalist(s)		Javier Ibáñez	Bulgaria

The men's 57 kg (featherweight) boxing event at the 2024 Summer Olympics took place between 28 July and 10 August 2024. Preliminary boxing matches occurred at Arena Paris Nord in Villepinte, with the medal rounds (semifinals and finals) staged at Stade Roland Garros.

== Background ==
This was the 25th appearance of the men's featherweight event. This event made the debut in 1904 and held every event in Olympic boxing (excluded from 1912) until 2008, In 2012 and 2016, there was no featherweight class, in 2020 the featherweight returned and bantamweight was eliminated. With no bantamweight, the lower end of the featherweight drops to 52 kg; the maximum remains 57 kg.

Albert Batyrgaziev was the reigning champion, but he did not participate because IOC barred the Russian Olympic Committee due to Russian invasion of Ukraine. The 2020 silver medalist Duke Ragan and the bronze medalists Samuel Takyi and Lázaro Álvarez did not participate. Abdumalik Khalokov became the 2024 Olympic champion. Munarbek Seitbek Uulu won silver, and Charlie Senior and Javier Ibáñez became bronze medalists. All of them won their first Olympic medals.

== Qualification ==
Each NOC could send one boxer to the event.

- 4 places at 2023 European Games
- 1 place at 2023 African Boxing Olympic Qualification Tournament
- 2 places at 2022 Asian Games
- 2 places at 2023 Pan American Games
- 1 place at 2023 Pacific Games
- 4 places at World Qualifiers Round 1
- 3 places at World Qualifiers Round 2
- 1 universality place.

== Competition format ==
Like all Olympic boxing events, the competition was a straight single-elimination tournament. The competition began with a preliminary round, where the number of competitors was reduced to 16, and concluded with a final. As there were fewer than 32 boxers in the competition, a number of boxers received a bye through the preliminary round. Both semi-final losers were awarded bronze medals.

Bouts consisted of three three-minute rounds with a one-minute break between rounds. A boxer may win by knockout or by points. Scoring was on the "10-point-must," with five judges scoring each round. Judges consider "number of blows landed on the target areas, domination of the bout, technique and tactical superiority and competitiveness." Each judge determined a winner for each round, who received 10 points for the round, and assigned the round's loser a number of points between seven and nine based on performance. The judge's scores for each round were added to give a total score for that judge. The boxer with the higher score from a majority of the judges was the winner.

== Schedule ==
The schedule was as follows.

Legend

R32	Round of 32	R16	Round of 16	QF	Quarter-Finals	SF	Semi-Finals	F	Final

Jul 28	Jul 29	Jul 30	Jul 31	Aug 1	Aug 2	Aug 3	Aug 4	Aug 5	Aug 6	Aug 7	Aug 8	Aug 9	Aug 10
R32			R16			QF					SF		F

== Draw ==
The draw was held on 25 July 2024.

== Seeds ==
The seeds were released on 25 July 2024.

1. Abdumalik Khalokov (UZB) (champion)
2. Javier Ibáñez (BUL) (semifinals)
3. Jahmal Harvey (USA) (quarterfinals)
4. Charlie Senior (AUS) (semifinals)
5. ~~Dolapo Omole (NGR)~~
6. Saidel Horta (CUB) (round of 16)
7. Shudai Harada (JPN) (round of 16)
8. José Quiles (ESP) (quarterfinals)

== Results ==
=== Round of 32 ===
Round of 32
28 July
Nebil Ibrahim (SWE)	5
Wasim Abusal (PLE)	0

=== Bracket ===
Round of 16
31 July
Abdumalik Khalokov (UZB)	5
Nebil Ibrahim (SWE)	0
31 July
Makhmud Sabyrkhan (KAZ)	1
José Quiles (ESP)	4
31 July
Carlo Paalam (PHI)	5
Jude Gallagher (IRL)	0
31 July
Vasile Usturoi (BEL)	1
Charlie Senior (AUS)	4
31 July
Jahmal Harvey (USA)	3
Luiz Oliveira (BRA)	2
31 July
Munarbek Seitbek Uulu (KGZ)	3
Saidel Horta (CUB)	2
31 July
Shudai Harada (JPN)	5
Yilmar González (COL)	0
31 July
Aider Abduraimov (UKR)	0
Javier Ibáñez (BUL)	5

Quarterfinals
3 August
Abdumalik Khalokov (UZB)	5
José Quiles (ESP)	0
3 August
Carlo Paalam (PHI)	2
Charlie Senior (AUS)	3
3 August
Jahmal Harvey (USA)	2
Munarbek Seitbek Uulu (KGZ)	3
3 August
Shudai Harada (JPN)	0
Javier Ibáñez (BUL)	5

Semifinals
8 August
Abdumalik Khalokov (UZB)	5
Charlie Senior (AUS)	0
8 August
Munarbek Seitbek Uulu (KGZ)	4
Javier Ibáñez (BUL)	1

Final
10 August
Abdumalik Khalokov (UZB)	5
Munarbek Seitbek Uulu (KGZ)	0
