= 2021 AIBA World Boxing Championships – Featherweight =

Boxing tournament in 2021

Featherweight at the 2021 AIBA World Boxing Championships
- Venue: Štark Arena
- Location: Belgrade, Serbia
- Dates: 25 October – 6 November
- Competitors: 44 from 44 nations

Medalists
gold medal	Jahmal Harvey	United States
silver medal	Serik Temirzhanov	Kazakhstan
bronze medal	Samuel Kistohurry	France
bronze medal	Osvel Caballero	Cuba

The Featherweight competition at the 2021 AIBA World Boxing Championships was held from 25 October to 6 November 2021.

== Results ==
=== Finals ===
Semifinals
(France) Samuel Kistohurry	0
(United States) Jahmal Harvey	5
(Kazakhstan) Serik Temirzhanov	3
(Cuba) Osvel Caballero	2

Final
(United States) Jahmal Harvey	5
(Kazakhstan) Serik Temirzhanov	0

=== Top half ===
==== Section 1 ====
First round
(Trinidad and Tobago) Anthony Joseph	w/o
(Mauritius) Niven Chemben
(Cyprus) Giorgos Stavrou	0
(Colombia) Yilmar González	5
(Bulgaria) Javier Ibáñez	5
Hasibullah Malikzadah	0

Second round
Fawaz Aborode	4
(Trinidad and Tobago) Anthony Joseph	1
(England) Niall Farrell	2
(France) Samuel Kistohurry	3
(Tajikistan) Khusravkhon Rakhimov	0
(Colombia) Yilmar González	5
(Bulgaria) Javier Ibáñez	RSC
(Croatia) Filip Kolak

Third round
Fawaz Aborode	0
(France) Samuel Kistohurry	5
(Colombia) Yilmar González	0
(Bulgaria) Javier Ibáñez	3

Quarterfinals
(France) Samuel Kistohurry	3
(Bulgaria) Javier Ibáñez	2

==== Section 2 ====
First round
(Brazil) Luiz Gabriel Oliveira	5
(Hong Kong) Rex Tso	0
(United States) Jahmal Harvey	4
(Belgium) Vasile Usturoi	1
(Ukraine) Oleh Chuliacheief	0
Rujakran Juntrong	5

Second round
(Italy) Raffaele Di Serio	1
(Brazil) Luiz Gabriel Oliveira	4
(United States) Jahmal Harvey	3
(Uzbekistan) Mirazizbek Mirzakhalilov	2
(Kyrgyzstan) Akylbek Esenbek Uulu	5
(Serbia) Veljko Gligorić	0
Rujakran Juntrong	5
(Guyana) Keevin Allicock	0

Third round
(Brazil) Luiz Gabriel Oliveira	0
(United States) Jahmal Harvey	5
(Kyrgyzstan) Akylbek Esenbek Uulu	0
Rujakran Juntrong	5

Quarterfinals
(United States) Jahmal Harvey	5
Rujakran Juntrong	0

=== Bottom half ===
==== Section 3 ====
First round
(Turkey) Nurettin Ovat	5
(Spain) Antonio Barrul	0
(India) Rohit Mor	5
(Ecuador) Jean Caicedo	0
(Kazakhstan) Serik Temirzhanov	5
(Mongolia) Kharkhüügiin Enkh-Amar	0

Second round
(Poland) Paweł Brach	2
(Turkey) Nurettin Ovat	3
(Republic of Ireland) Adam Hession	1
Eduard Savvin	4
(Bosnia and Herzegovina) Alen Rahimić	0
(India) Rohit Mor	5
(Kazakhstan) Serik Temirzhanov	5
(Japan) Reito Tsutsumi	0

Third round
(Turkey) Nurettin Ovat	0
Eduard Savvin	5
(India) Rohit Mor	1
(Kazakhstan) Serik Temirzhanov	4

Quarterfinals
Eduard Savvin	0
(Kazakhstan) Serik Temirzhanov	5

==== Section 4 ====
First round
(Puerto Rico) Jan Rivera
(Armenia) Artur Bazeyan	w/o
(Azerbaijan) Umid Rustamov	0
(Cuba) Osvel Caballero	5
(Germany) Umar Bajwa
(Mexico) Miguel Vega	RSC

Second round
(Chinese Taipei) Chen Po-yi
(Armenia) Artur Bazeyan	w/o
(Cuba) Osvel Caballero	RSC-I
(Iran) Sajjad Mohammadpour
(Kenya) Martin Aluoch	0
(Democratic Republic of the Congo) Nathan Lunata Nkosi	5
(Mexico) Miguel Vega	5
(Nepal) Puran Rai	0

Third round
(Armenia) Artur Bazeyan	0
(Cuba) Osvel Caballero	5
(Democratic Republic of the Congo) Nathan Lunata Nkosi	0
(Mexico) Miguel Vega	5

Quarterfinals
(Cuba) Osvel Caballero	5
(Mexico) Miguel Vega	0
