= 2023 IBA World Boxing Championships – Lightweight =

Lightweight at the 2023 IBA World Boxing Championships
- Venue: Humo Arena
- Location: Tashkent, Uzbekistan
- Dates: 1–14 May
- Competitors: 43 from 43 nations

Medalists
gold medal	Sofiane Oumiha	France
silver medal	Erislandy Álvarez	Cuba
bronze medal	Mohammad Abu Jajeh	Jordan
bronze medal	Vsevolod Shumkov	Russia

The Lightweight competition at the 2023 IBA Men's World Boxing Championships was held between 1 and 14 May 2023.

== Results ==
=== Finals ===
Semifinals
(Cuba) Erislandy Álvarez	5
(Jordan) Mohammad Abu Jajeh	0
(Russia) Vsevolod Shumkov	1
(France) Sofiane Oumiha	4

Final
(Cuba) Erislandy Álvarez	1
(France) Sofiane Oumiha	4

=== Top half ===
==== Section 1 ====
Round of 64
(Palestine) Anas Sleiman	0
(Mongolia) Tegshjargalyn Enkhtör	5
(Armenia) Artur Ghazaryan	KO
(Burundi) Muhamed Ntungiyebose
(South Korea) Suh Min-je	1
(Japan) Ren Ohashi	3

Round of 32
(Dominican Republic) Alexy de la Cruz	5
(Mongolia) Tegshjargalyn Enkhtör	0
(Cuba) Erislandy Álvarez	RSC
(Indonesia) Gianlugi Kalaipupin
(Zambia) Andrew Chilata	4
(Armenia) Artur Ghazaryan	1
(Japan) Ren Ohashi
(Georgia (country)) Artush Gomtsyan	ABD

Round of 16
(Dominican Republic) Alexy de la Cruz	1
(Cuba) Erislandy Álvarez	4
(Zambia) Andrew Chilata	4
(Georgia (country)) Artush Gomtsyan	0

Quarterfinals
(Cuba) Erislandy Álvarez	5
(Zambia) Andrew Chilata	0

==== Section 2 ====
Round of 64
(Tajikistan) Abubakr Murodzoda	RSC
(Sierra Leone) Abu Kanu
(Kazakhstan) Talgat Syrymbetov	5
(Thailand) Sakda Ruamtham	0

Round of 32
(Iran) Danial Shahbakhsh	5
(Tajikistan) Abubakr Murodzoda	0
(El Salvador) Alejandro Monterrosa	0
(Bulgaria) Radoslav Rosenov	5
(Zimbabwe) Luckmore Kamoto	0
(Fiji) Jone Davule	5
(Kazakhstan) Talgat Syrymbetov	1
(Jordan) Mohammad Abu Jajeh	4

Round of 16
(Iran) Danial Shahbakhsh	3
(Bulgaria) Radoslav Rosenov	4
(Fiji) Jone Davule	0
(Jordan) Mohammad Abu Jajeh	5

Quarterfinals
(Bulgaria) Radoslav Rosenov	3
(Jordan) Mohammad Abu Jajeh	4

=== Bottom half ===
==== Section 3 ====
Round of 64
(Israel) Vladislav Voroshilov	w/o
(Afghanistan) Abdullah Mohammadi
(India) Varinder Singh	0
(Uzbekistan) Mujibillo Tursunov	5
(Italy) Francesco Iozia	4
(Belarus) Artur Tuniyeu	1

Round of 32
(Russia) Vsevolod Shumkov	RSC
(Israel) Vladislav Voroshilov
(Kyrgyzstan) Mirzokhid Imamnazarov	2
(Azerbaijan) Tayfur Aliyev	5
(The Gambia) Marry Corr
(Uzbekistan) Mujibillo Tursunov	RSC
(Italy) Francesco Iozia	3
(Morocco) Mohamed Hamout	4

Round of 16
(Russia) Vsevolod Shumkov	5
(Azerbaijan) Tayfur Aliyev	0
(Uzbekistan) Mujibillo Tursunov	5
(Morocco) Mohamed Hamout	0

Quarterfinals
(Russia) Vsevolod Shumkov	5
(Uzbekistan) Mujibillo Tursunov	2

==== Section 4 ====
Round of 64
(Albania) Krenar Zeneli	w/o
(Eswatini) Chawe Gamedze
(Chinese Taipei) Lin Jun-you	0
(China) Zhao Yikun	5
(Slovenia) Tadej Černoga	0
(Ghana) Abdul Omar	5

Round of 32
(Spain) José Quiles	RSC
(Albania) Krenar Zeneli
(China) Zhao Yikun
(Turkmenistan) Şükür Öwezow	RSC
(Moldova) Victor Vacula	0
(Venezuela) José Carfunjol	5
(Ghana) Abdul Omar	0
(France) Sofiane Oumiha	5

Round of 16
(Spain) José Quiles	5
(Turkmenistan) Şükür Öwezow	0
(Venezuela) José Carfunjol	0
(France) Sofiane Oumiha	5

Quarterfinals
(Spain) José Quiles	0
(France) Sofiane Oumiha	5
