= 2021 AIBA World Boxing Championships – Lightweight =

Lightweight at the 2021 AIBA World Boxing Championships
- Venue: Štark Arena
- Location: Belgrade, Serbia
- Dates: 27 October – 5 November
- Competitors: 51 from 51 nations

Medalists
gold medal	Sofiane Oumiha	France
silver medal	Abdumalik Khalokov	Uzbekistan
bronze medal	Danial Shahbakhsh	Iran
bronze medal	Alexy de la Cruz	Dominican Republic

The Lightweight competition at the 2021 AIBA World Boxing Championships was held between 27 October and 5 November.

== Results ==
=== Finals ===
Semifinals
(Uzbekistan) Abdumalik Khalokov	w/o
(Iran) Danial Shahbakhsh
(France) Sofiane Oumiha	4
(Dominican Republic) Alexy de la Cruz	1

Final
(Uzbekistan) Abdumalik Khalokov	0
(France) Sofiane Oumiha	5

=== Top half ===
==== Section 1 ====
First round
(United States) Jonathan Mansour	1
Vsevolod Shumkov	4
(Pakistan) Kamil Syed	0
(Greece) Karcis Theocharis	5
(Japan) Hayato Tsutsumi	5
(Cuba) Lázaro Álvarez	0
(Seychelles) Fabio Roselie	0
(North Macedonia) Jasin Ljama	5
(Slovenia) Tadej Černoga	3
(Bulgaria) Kiril Rusinov	2

Second round
(Belarus) Artur Tuniyeu	0
Vsevolod Shumkov	5
(Greece) Karcis Theocharis	0
(Japan) Hayato Tsutsumi	5
(Uzbekistan) Abdumalik Khalokov	5
(North Macedonia) Jasin Ljama	0
(Slovenia) Tadej Černoga	5
(Panama) Orlando Martínez	0

Third round
Vsevolod Shumkov	4
(Japan) Hayato Tsutsumi	1
(Uzbekistan) Abdumalik Khalokov	5
(Slovenia) Tadej Černoga	0

Quarterfinals
Vsevolod Shumkov	0
(Uzbekistan) Abdumalik Khalokov	5

==== Section 2 ====
First round
(Republic of Ireland) John Hale	0
(Serbia) Semiz Aličić	5
(Georgia (country)) Artyush Gomtsyan	0
(Lithuania) Edgaras Skurdelis	5
(Democratic Republic of the Congo) Fretas Pembele Zola	0
(Kyrgyzstan) Munarbek Seitbek Uulu	5
(Iran) Danial Shahbakhsh	5
(The Gambia) Musa Cham	0

Second round
(Laos) Walter Sarnoi Oupathana	0
(Serbia) Semiz Aličić	5
(Lithuania) Edgaras Skurdelis	5
Laisullah Azizi	0
(Ukraine) Maksym Zhyharov	0
(Kyrgyzstan) Munarbek Seitbek Uulu	5
(Iran) Danial Shahbakhsh	5
(Mexico) Gustavo Rivera	0

Third round
(Serbia) Semiz Aličić	0
(Lithuania) Edgaras Skurdelis	5
(Kyrgyzstan) Munarbek Seitbek Uulu	0
(Iran) Danial Shahbakhsh	5

Quarterfinals
(Lithuania) Edgaras Skurdelis	2
(Iran) Danial Shahbakhsh	3

=== Bottom half ===
==== Section 3 ====
First round
(India) Varinder Singh
(Armenia) Karen Tonakanyan	w/o
(Slovakia) Viliam Tankó	5
(Mauritius) Jean Agathe	0
(South Korea) Ham Sang-myeong	0
(France) Sofiane Oumiha	5
(Croatia) Diego Mamić	0
(Colombia) Duvan Zuleta	5
(Sierra Leone) Tamba Sorgor
Khunatip Pidnuch	w/o

Second round
(Mali) Abdoul-Karim Bathily
(Armenia) Karen Tonakanyan	KO
(Slovakia) Viliam Tankó	0
(France) Sofiane Oumiha	5
(Chinese Taipei) Hung Chia-ching	0
(Colombia) Duvan Zuleta	5
Khunatip Pidnuch	2
(Kazakhstan) Samatali Toltayev	3

Third round
(Armenia) Karen Tonakanyan
(France) Sofiane Oumiha	RSC-I
(Colombia) Duvan Zuleta	1
(Kazakhstan) Samatali Toltayev	4

Quarterfinals
(France) Sofiane Oumiha	4
(Kazakhstan) Samatali Toltayev	1

==== Section 4 ====
First round
(Kenya) Nicholas Okoth	0
(Dominican Republic) Alexy de la Cruz	5
(Turkey) Mizan Aykol	0
(Hungary) Roland Veres	5
(Trinidad and Tobago) Donnel Phillip	0
(Mongolia) Oyunbaataryn Tulga	5
(Israel) Bishara Sabbar	1
(Finland) Arslan Khataev	4
(Haiti) Charles Petit-Homme	0
(Azerbaijan) Tayfur Aliyev	5

Second round
(Germany) Murat Yildirim	0
(Dominican Republic) Alexy de la Cruz	3
(Hungary) Roland Veres	2
(Tajikistan) Abdurahmon Yoqubov	3
(Mongolia) Oyunbaataryn Tulga
(Finland) Arslan Khataev	RSC-I
(Azerbaijan) Tayfur Aliyev	5
(Italy) Simone Spada	0

Third round
(Dominican Republic) Alexy de la Cruz	5
(Tajikistan) Abdurahmon Yoqubov	0
(Finland) Arslan Khataev	4
(Azerbaijan) Tayfur Aliyev	1

Quarterfinals
(Dominican Republic) Alexy de la Cruz	4
(Finland) Arslan Khataev	1
