= Boxing at the 2019 European Games – Men's 56 kg =

Boxing competitions

Men's bantamweight boxing at the 2019 European Games
- Venue: Uruchie Sports Palace
- Date: 21–30 June
- Competitors: 22 from 22 nations

Medalists
gold medal	Kurt Walker	Ireland
silver medal	Mykola Butsenko	Ukraine
bronze medal	Peter McGrail	Great Britain
bronze medal	Sharafa Raman	Germany

The men's bantamweight 56 kg boxing event at the 2019 European Games in Minsk was held from 21 to 30 June at the Uruchie Sports Palace.

== Results ==
=== Final ===
Final; 30 June
Kurt Walker (IRL)	5
Mykola Butsenko (UKR)	0

=== Top half ===
Round of 32; 21 June
Nándor Csóka (HUN)	1
Vasile Usturoi (BEL)	4
Veljko Gligorić (SRB)	0
Samuel Kistohurry (FRA)	5
Robert Jitaru (ROU)	1
Zhirayr Sargsyan (ARM)	4

Round of 16; 24 June
Peter McGrail (GBR)	5
Vasile Usturoi (BEL)	0
Krenar Zeneli (ALB)	5
Tiago Pugno (SUI)	0
Raffaele Di Serio (ITA)	0
Samuel Kistohurry (FRA)	5
Zhirayr Sargsyan (ARM)	1
Kurt Walker (IRL)	4

Quarterfinals; 26 June
Peter McGrail (GBR)	5
Krenar Zeneli (ALB)	0
Samuel Kistohurry (FRA)	0
Kurt Walker (IRL)	5

Semifinals; 28 June
Peter McGrail (GBR)	2
Kurt Walker (IRL)	3

=== Bottom half ===
Round of 32; 21 June
Sharafa Raman (GER)	RSC
Viktor Vacula (MDA)
Artyush Gomtsyan (GEO)	5
Jarosław Iwanow (POL)	0
Tayfur Aliyev (AZE)	3
Boyan Asenov (BUL)	2

Round of 16; 24 June
José Quiles (ESP)	1
Sharafa Raman (GER)	4
Artyush Gomtsyan (GEO)	5
Bakhtovar Nazirov (RUS)	0
Nikalai Shakh (BLR)	5
Alen Rahimić (BIH)	0
Tayfur Aliyev (AZE)	1
Mykola Butsenko (UKR)	4

Quarterfinals; 26 June
Sharafa Raman (GER)	4
Artyush Gomtsyan (GEO)	1
Nikalai Shakh (BLR)	0
Mykola Butsenko (UKR)	5

Semifinals; 28 June
Sharafa Raman (GER)	2
Mykola Butsenko (UKR)	3
