= Charlie Senior =

Australian boxer (born 2001)

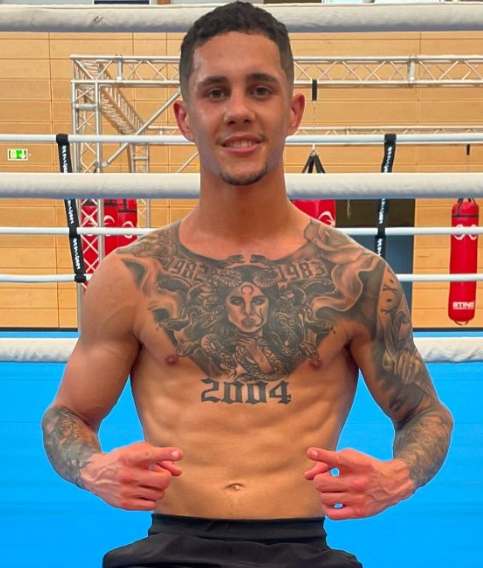
- Senior in 2024

Personal information
- Nationality: Australian
- Born: 20 November 2001 (age 24) Bradford, West Yorkshire, England
- Height: 1.78 m (5 ft 10 in)
- Weight: Featherweight

Boxing career
- Stance: Orthodox

Boxing record
- Total fights: 2
- Wins: 2
Medal record
Men's amateur boxing
Representing Australia
Olympic Games
Bronze medal – third place	2024 Paris	Featherweight
Pacific Games
Gold medal – first place	2023 Honiara	Light welterweight

Charlie Senior (born 20 November 2001) is a professional boxer. Born in England, he represented Australia at the 2023 Pacific Games, where he won the gold medal, and the 2024 Summer Olympics, where he won the bronze medal.

== Early life ==
Senior was born in Bradford, West Yorkshire, England on 20 November 2001. When he was two years of age, he emigrated with his family to Perth, Western Australia. He initially took up dancing before he switched to boxing when he was eleven years of age.

== Amateur career ==
Senior won three national youth championships and then he won the Australian amateur title. He then fought in the 2020 Asia & Oceania Olympic Qualification Tournament in Jordan, where in his opening bout, he lost to Nguyễn Văn Đương.

Senior was one of eleven Australian boxers selected to compete at the 2022 Commonwealth Games. In the men's featherweight event, he lost to Keoma-Ali Al-Ahmadieh in the round of 16.

Senior won the gold medal at the 2023 Pacific Games in Honiara, defeating Allan Oaike and qualified for the 2024 Summer Olympics in Paris. At the 57 kg event of the Paris Olympics, he defeated Vasile Usturoi in the round of 16. Senior then defeated Carlo Paalam in the quarterfinals. He lost in the semi-final against Abdumalik Khalokov, winning a bronze medal in the process.

== Professional career ==
In November 2024, Senior signed a promotional deal with Frank Warren's Queensberry Promotions. He made his pro-debut at Nottingham Arena on 10 May 2025, defeating Cesar Ignacio Paredes on points in a six-round bout.

Senior faced Darwin Martinez at the Altrincham Ice Dome on 23 August 2025. After six rounds, he won the bout by points decision.

== Professional boxing record ==
2 fights	2 wins	0 losses
By decision	2	0

No.	Result	Record	Opponent	Type	Round, time	Date	Location	Notes
2	Win	2–0	Darwin Martinez	PTS	6	23 Aug 2025	Altrincham Ice Dome, Altrincham, England	
1	Win	1–0	Cesar Ignacio Paredes	PTS	6	10 May 2025	Nottingham Arena, Nottingham, England	
