= Boxing at the 2019 Pan American Games – Men's 56 kg =

Men's Bantamweight at the 2019 Pan American Games
- Venue: Miguel Grau Coliseum
- Dates: July 29– August 2, 2019
- Competitors: 8 from 8 nations

Medalists
Gold medal	Osvel Caballero	Cuba
Silver medal	Duke Ragan	United States
Bronze medal	Lucas Fernández	Uruguay
Bronze medal	Alexy de la Cruz	Dominican Republic

The Men's bantamweight competition of the boxing events at the 2019 Pan American Games in Lima, Peru, was held between the 29 of July and the 2 of August 2019 at the Miguel Grau Coliseum.

Like all Pan American boxing events, the competition is a straight single-elimination tournament. Both semifinal losers are awarded bronze medals, so no boxers compete again after their first loss. Bouts consist of a 3 rounds "10-point must" scoring system used in the pro game, where the winner of each round must be awarded 10 points and the loser a lesser amount, and the elimination of the padded headgear. Five judges scored each bout. The winner will be the boxer who scored the most at the end of the match.

== Results ==
=== Bracket ===
Quarterfinals; July 29, 2019
Duke Ragan (USA)	5
Jorvi Farroñan (PER)	0
Keevin Allicock (GUY)	2
Lucas Fernández (URU)	3
Alexy de la Cruz (DOM)	5
Jean Caicedo (ECU)	0
Osvel Caballero (CUB)	5
Ceiber Ávila (COL)	0

Semifinals; July 30, 2019
Duke Ragan (USA)	5
Lucas Fernández (URU)	0
Alexy de la Cruz (DOM)	1
Osvel Caballero (CUB)	4

Final; August 2, 2019
Duke Ragan (USA)	0
Osvel Caballero (CUB)	5
