= Abdumalik Khalokov =

Uzbekistani boxer (born 2000)

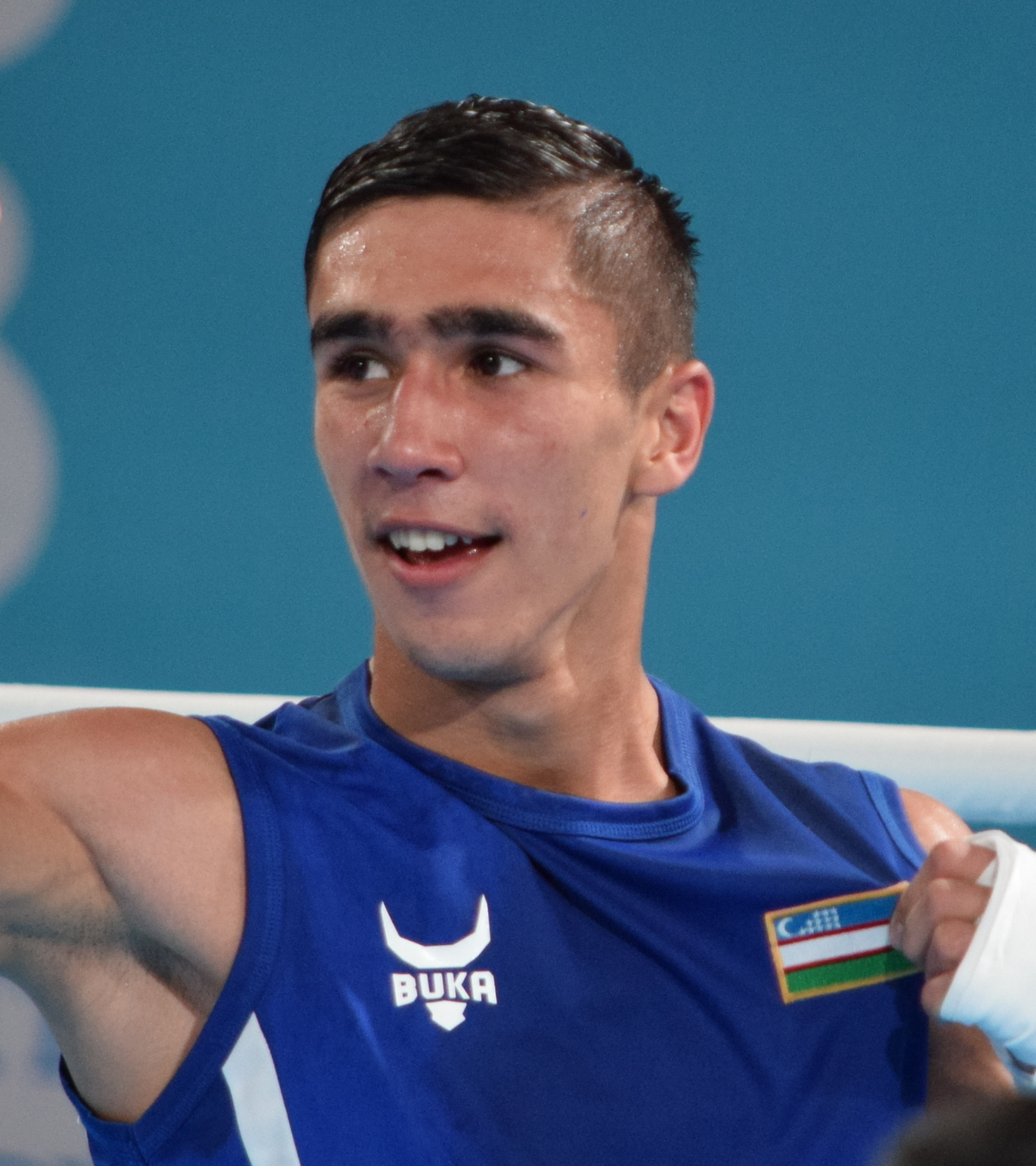
- Khalokov in 2018

Personal information
- Born: 9 April 2000 (age 26) Bukhara, Uzbekistan
- Height: 1.74 m (5 ft 9 in)
- Weight: Lightweight

Boxing career
- Stance: Orthodox
Medal record
Men's amateur boxer
Representing Uzbekistan
Olympic Games
Gold medal – first place	2024 Paris	Featherweight
World Championships
Gold medal – first place	2025 Liverpool	60 kg
IBA World Championships
Gold medal – first place	2023 Tashkent	Featherweight
Silver medal – second place	2021 Belgrade	Lightweight
Silver medal – second place	2025 Dubai	Lightweight
Asian Games
Gold medal – first place	2022 Hangzhou	57 kg
Gold medal – first place	2026 Aichi–Nagoya	60 kg
Asian Championships
Gold medal – first place	2022 Amman	Featherweight
Bronze medal – third place	2021 Dubai	Lightweight
Summer Youth Olympics
Gold medal – first place	2018 Buenos Aires	Bantamweight
Youth World Championships
Gold medal – first place	2018 Budapest	Bantamweight

Abdumalik Khalokov (Uzbek: Abdumalik Anvar o‘g‘li Xaloqov; born 9 April 2000) is an Uzbek amateur boxer, who won a gold medal at the 2024 Summer Olympics. Gold medalist of 2023 IBA Men's World Boxing Championships.

== Amateur career ==
He won gold medal at the 2018 Summer Youth Olympics in bantamweight −56kg and at the AIBA Youth World Boxing Championships 2018 in −56 kg weight category. At the 2018 Youth World Championships he fought against Russian Vsevolod Shumkov and won gold medal in bantamweight. He became the Uzbekistani national champion in the senior category in 2019 and 2020. He was named the best boxer of the 2019 national championship. In 2021 Khalokov took part at the AIBA World Boxing Championships 2021 in Belgrade, Serbia and won silver medal of tournier in Lightweight (60kg) division. He trains under the guidance of Davron Gafurov.

=== 2021 World Championships ===
Khalokov made his senior World Championship debut in the lightweight division at the 2021 AIBA World Boxing Championships in Belgrade, Serbia. He began his campaign with a unanimous-decision victory over Jasin Ljama of North Macedonia.

In the round of 16, he defeated Slovenia's Tadej Černoga by unanimous decision. Khalokov then faced his former youth-level rival Vsevolod Shumkov in the quarter-finals and won another unanimous decision to secure his first senior World Championship medal.

Khalokov advanced directly from the semi-finals after Iran's Danial Shahbakhsh withdrew because of injury. In the final, he faced France's Sofiane Oumiha, the 2017 world champion and 2016 Olympic silver medallist. Oumiha won the bout by unanimous decision, leaving Khalokov with the silver medal.

=== 2022 Asian Championships ===
In 2022, Khalokov moved down from the lightweight division to the 57 kg featherweight category. He competed at the 2022 Asian Amateur Boxing Championships in Amman, Jordan, where he defeated Iran's Sajjad Mohammadpour in the quarter-finals.

In the semi-finals, Khalokov defeated Mongolia's Gantumur Lundaa to reach the gold-medal bout. He faced reigning world champion Serik Temirzhanov of Kazakhstan in the final. After losing the opening round on three judges' scorecards, Khalokov recovered during the final two rounds and won the bout to claim his first senior Asian title.

=== 2023 World Championships and Asian Games ===
Khalokov competed in the featherweight division at the 2023 IBA Men's World Boxing Championships, held in Tashkent, Uzbekistan. During the tournament, he defeated Australia's Charlie Senior and continued through the competition to reach his second consecutive World Championship final.

In the final, Khalokov faced Cuba's Saidel Horta. He controlled the bout with his movement and counter-punching and won by unanimous decision, becoming the 57 kg world champion.

Later that year, Khalokov represented Uzbekistan at the postponed 2022 Asian Games in Hangzhou, China. The competition also served as an Asian qualification tournament for the 2024 Summer Olympics. He defeated China's Lü Ping by unanimous decision in the semi-finals, securing both a place in the final and an Olympic quota for Uzbekistan.

In the final, Khalokov faced Japan's Shudai Harada. He dominated the contest before Harada's corner stopped the bout in the second round, giving Khalokov the Asian Games gold medal.

=== 2024 Summer Olympics ===
Khalokov entered the men's 57 kg competition at the 2024 Summer Olympics in Paris as the reigning world and Asian Games champion. He began in the round of 16, defeating Sweden's Nebil Ibrahim by unanimous decision.

In the quarter-finals, Khalokov defeated Spain's José Quiles by unanimous decision to guarantee himself an Olympic medal. He then faced Australia's Charlie Senior in the semi-finals and won 5–0, advancing to the Olympic final without losing a round.

Khalokov faced Kyrgyzstan's Munarbek Seiitbek Uulu in the final at Stade Roland Garros on 10 August. He won all three rounds on each of the five judges' scorecards and secured the Olympic gold medal by unanimous decision.

=== 2025 World Championships ===
In September 2025, Khalokov competed in the 60 kg lightweight division at the inaugural 2025 World Boxing Championships in Liverpool, England. He defeated Italy's Giuseppe Canonico by unanimous decision in the round of 16 and then overcame Kazakhstan's Zhexen Bibars in the quarter-finals.

In the semi-finals, Khalokov faced Japan's Shunsuke Kitamoto. The bout was stopped in the second round following an accidental clash of heads and went to the judges' scorecards, where Khalokov held a unanimous lead.

Khalokov subsequently won the lightweight final and became one of the first men's champions at a World Boxing-organised World Championship.

In December, he returned to the 60 kg division at the 2025 IBA Men's World Boxing Championships in Dubai. Khalokov progressed to the final, where he met Russia's Vsevolod Shumkov, whom he had previously defeated at the 2018 Youth World Championships and the 2021 senior World Championships.

The final was sent to a bout review after the judges initially returned a close decision. Shumkov was declared the winner by a 4–3 reviewed decision, while Khalokov received the silver medal.

== Professional boxing record ==
2 fights	2 wins	0 losses
By knockout	2	0
By decision	0	0

No.	Result	Record	Opponent	Type	Round, time	Date	Location	Notes
2	Win	2–0	Marlembron Acuna	TKO	3 (6)	27 Feb 2025	Centro Deportivo San Pablo, Seville, Spain	
1	Win	1–0	Oleksandr Yegorov	KO	2 (4) 1:58	17 Nov 2023	Humo Arena, Tashkent, Uzbekistan	
