= Julius Yasir Ballo =

American professional boxer (born 2003)

Julius Ballo

Personal information
- Nickname: JuJu
- Nationality: American
- Born: Julius Yasir Ballo; April 20, 2003 (age 23) San Diego, California, U.S.
- Height: 5 ft 7 in (1.70 m)

Boxing career
- Weight class: Featherweight
- Stance: Orthodox

Boxing record
- Total fights: 5
- Wins: 5
- Win by KO: 1
- Losses: 0
- Draws: 0

Julius Yasir Ballo (born April 20, 2003), known as JuJu Ballo, is an American professional boxer from San Diego, California, of Iraqi and Chaldean Catholic descent. A multi-time USA Boxing National Champion and 2021 Junior Pan American Games gold medalist as an amateur, he turned professional in 2025 after signing with Top Rank. He was undefeated through his first five professional fights as of October 2026. He frequently appears on the same fight cards as his cousin, fellow professional boxer Jonathan "Jonny" Mansour.

== Early life ==
Ballo was born in San Diego and raised in the city's East County area, including the communities of Lakeside and El Cajon. His father, Yasir Ballo, immigrated to the United States from Iraq and boxed as an amateur before opening Bomber Squad Boxing Academy in El Cajon, where Julius trains under Berlin Kerney. Ballo has said he began boxing at age three. The Ballo family also owns El Pueblo Mexican Food, a restaurant chain with five locations. The family is of Iraqi and Chaldean Catholic descent, part of a Chaldean community with a significant presence in both San Diego and Detroit; San Diego County is home to the second-largest Chaldean community in the United States, and Detroit the largest.

== Amateur career ==
Ballo won USA Boxing's National Championships in 2021, 2022, and 2023, and has been described in later coverage as a three-time national champion. He was named USA Boxing's Youth Athlete of the Year for 2021. He won gold at the 2021 Junior Pan American Games in Cali, Colombia, and closed his amateur career with the 2024 National Golden Gloves championship. The Ring reported that Ballo had more than 200 amateur bouts while representing Team USA; BoxRec lists his amateur record at 51 wins and 8 losses. Ballo's promotional team has described him as having been ranked the No. 1 pound-for-pound amateur boxer in the United States out of an estimated 55,000 amateur competitors, though this ranking has not been independently verified.

Among his amateur wins was a decision over Jahmal Harvey, who was already a world amateur champion at the time and went on to represent the United States at the 2024 Paris Olympics. Ballo did not qualify for the Olympic roster himself, an outcome he later described as one of the more disappointing results of his amateur career.

== Professional career ==
=== Signing with Top Rank ===
In January 2025, Ballo signed with Top Rank. He is managed by James Prince and his father, Yasir Ballo. By 2026, Ballo's own social media following was reported by his team at more than 1.2 million combined across Instagram and TikTok.

=== 2025: Professional debut ===
Ballo made his professional debut on July 26, 2025, at the Madison Square Garden Theater in New York, defeating Brandan Ayala by unanimous decision over four rounds. Ahead of the fight, he told TMZ Sports he intended to "make my name up there in the pound-for-pound list."

On December 13, 2025, Ballo defeated Juan Centeno by unanimous decision over six rounds in Hollywood, California. Centeno stepped in as a late replacement opponent, and Ballo moved up two weight classes to make the fight; all three judges scored the bout 60-53.

=== 2026: SD Fight Night, Detroit debut and first knockout ===
On April 18, 2026, Ballo headlined an event billed as SD Fight Night at Frontwave Arena in Oceanside, California, a card he co-promoted with his father, defeating Roman Reyes by unanimous decision over six rounds to improve to 3-0. Discussing his motivation for continuing to box, Ballo told BoxingScene, "I don't have to do this. I drive a quarter-million-dollar car, and live in a multi-million-dollar house. I don't have to do this sport. I do it because I love it, and I am addicted to that winning feeling."

On August 29, 2026, Ballo made his Detroit debut at the Fox Theatre, on a card promoted by Salita Promotions with G2G Promotions that was marketed toward Metro Detroit's Chaldean and Middle Eastern communities and again shared with Mansour. Ballo said of the booking: "Fighting in Detroit is more than just another bout for me, this is an opportunity to represent my family, my Iraqi and Chaldean roots, and to give back to a community that's supported us from day one of this journey." In the co-main event, Ballo defeated Julian Gomez-Clemons by shutout unanimous decision over six rounds, with all three judges scoring the bout 60-54, before a sellout crowd reported as the largest for a boxing event in the Fox Theatre's history. Ahead of the bout, The Ring reported that Ballo aimed to become a multi-division world champion and to position himself for a featherweight world title opportunity by 2028.

On October 10, 2026, Ballo headlined a card billed as Champions of Tomorrow at Thunder Studios in Long Beach, California, stopping Carlos Torres in the third round of a scheduled six-round bout. It was the first knockout of his professional career and improved his record to 5-0. Mansour won the co-main event by unanimous decision.

== Personal life ==
Ballo is of Iraqi and Chaldean Catholic descent. His father, Yasir Ballo, boxed as an amateur after immigrating to the United States and later opened Bomber Squad Boxing Academy in El Cajon, where Julius trains and where his father has also worked alongside him as a co-promoter. He remains close with his cousin, professional boxer Jonny Mansour, with whom he trained as a youth and now frequently shares fight cards.

== Professional boxing record ==
Res.	Record	Opponent	Method	Date	Round	Location
Win	5-0	Carlos Torres	KO	October 10, 2026	3 (6)	Thunder Studios, Long Beach, California, U.S.
Win	4-0	Julian Gomez-Clemons	UD	August 29, 2026	6	Fox Theatre, Detroit, Michigan, U.S.
Win	3-0	Roman Reyes	UD	April 18, 2026	6	Frontwave Arena, Oceanside, California, U.S.
Win	2-0	Juan Centeno	UD	December 13, 2025	6	Hollywood, California, U.S.
Win	1-0	Brandan Ayala	UD	July 26, 2025	4	Madison Square Garden Theater, New York, U.S.
