= 2021 AIBA World Boxing Championships – Light heavyweight =

Light heavyweight at the 2021 AIBA World Boxing Championships
- Venue: Štark Arena
- Location: Belgrade, Serbia
- Dates: 26 October – 6 November
- Competitors: 41 from 41 nations

Medalists
gold medal	Robby Gonzales	United States
silver medal	Aliaksei Alfiorau	Belarus
bronze medal	Savelii Sadoma
bronze medal	Vladimir Mironchikov	Serbia

The Light heavyweight competition at the 2021 AIBA World Boxing Championships was held between 26 October and 6 November.

== Results ==
=== Finals ===
Semifinals
Savelii Sadoma	1
(Belarus) Aliaksei Alfiorau	4
(Serbia) Vladimir Mironchikov	2
(United States) Robby Gonzales	3

Final
(Belarus) Aliaksei Alfiorau	2
(United States) Robby Gonzales	3

=== Top half ===
==== Section 1 ====
First round
(Czech Republic) Maxim Schejbal	0
(Japan) Ren Umemura	4
(Montenegro) Petar Marčić	3
(Finland) Nikita Nystedt	2
Jakkapong Yomkhot	1
Savelii Sadoma	4

Second round
Silab Noori	5
(Japan) Ren Umemura	0
(Moldova) Andrei Chiriacov	3
(North Macedonia) Arsim Etemi	2
(Montenegro) Petar Marčić	5
(Barbados) Charles Cox	0
Savelii Sadoma	KO
(Armenia) Hambardzum Hakobyan

Third round
Silab Noori
(Moldova) Andrei Chiriacov	RSC-I
(Montenegro) Petar Marčić	0
Savelii Sadoma	5

Quarterfinals
(Moldova) Andrei Chiriacov	0
Savelii Sadoma	5

==== Section 2 ====
First round
(Germany) Silvio Schierle	2
(Tajikistan) Shabbos Negmatulloev	3
(Slovenia) Gregor Starašinič	0
(Croatia) Luka Plantić	5

Second round
(Sierra Leone) Samuel Kamara
(Tajikistan) Shabbos Negmatulloev	KO
(Republic of Ireland) Keylan Cassidy	5
(Mexico) Said Olvera	0
(Iran) Meisam Gheshlaghi	RSC
(Chinese Taipei) Chung Chia-yao
(Croatia) Luka Plantić	2
(Belarus) Aliaksei Alfiorau	3

Third round
(Tajikistan) Shabbos Negmatulloev	1
(Republic of Ireland) Keylan Cassidy	4
(Iran) Meisam Gheshlaghi	1
(Belarus) Aliaksei Alfiorau	4

Quarterfinals
(Republic of Ireland) Keylan Cassidy	0
(Belarus) Aliaksei Alfiorau	5

=== Bottom half ===
==== Section 3 ====
First round
(Bulgaria) Kristiyan Nikolov	5
(South Korea) Kim Gi-chae	0
(Estonia) Stiven Aas	1
(Hungary) Pál Kovács	4

Second round
(Lithuania) Robertas Liorančas	0
(Bulgaria) Kristiyan Nikolov	5
(Turkey) Kaan Aykutsun	0
(Serbia) Vladimir Mironchikov	5
(Kazakhstan) Nurbek Oralbay	5
(Brazil) Isaías Ribeiro	0
(Hungary) Pál Kovács	5
(Poland) Daniel Adamiec	0

Third round
(Bulgaria) Kristiyan Nikolov	0
(Serbia) Vladimir Mironchikov	5
(Kazakhstan) Nurbek Oralbay	5
(Hungary) Pál Kovács	0

Quarterfinals
(Serbia) Vladimir Mironchikov	5
(Kazakhstan) Nurbek Oralbay	0

==== Section 4 ====
First round
(Belgium) Ziad El Mohor	5
(Kenya) George Cosby Ouma	0
(Uzbekistan) Odiljon Aslonov	w/o
(Tanzania) Yusuf Changalawe

Second round
(Ukraine) Bogdan Tolmachov	4
(Belgium) Ziad El Mohor	0
(Kyrgyzstan) Omurbek Bekzhigit Uulu	4
(England) George Crotty	1
(India) Sachin Kumar	1
(United States) Robby Gonzales	4
(Uzbekistan) Odiljon Aslonov	4
(Italy) Simone Fiori	1

Third round
(Ukraine) Bogdan Tolmachov	0
(Kyrgyzstan) Omurbek Bekzhigit Uulu	5
(United States) Robby Gonzales	3
(Uzbekistan) Odiljon Aslonov	2

Quarterfinals
(Kyrgyzstan) Omurbek Bekzhigit Uulu	0
(United States) Robby Gonzales	5
