= 2025 IBA World Boxing Championships – Lightweight =

Lightweight at the 2025 IBA World Boxing Championships
- Venue: Dubai Duty Free Tennis Stadium
- Location: Dubai, United Arab Emirates
- Dates: 4–13 December
- Competitors: 42

Medalists
gold medal	Vsevolod Shumkov	Russia
silver medal	Abdumalik Khalokov	Uzbekistan
bronze medal	Artur Bazeyan	Armenia
bronze medal	Akmal Ubaidov	Tajikistan

The Lightweight competition at the 2025 IBA Men's World Boxing Championships was held from 4 to 13 December 2025.

== Results ==
=== Finals ===
Semifinals
(Uzbekistan) Abdumalik Khalokov	5
(Armenia) Artur Bazeyan	0
(Tajikistan) Akmal Ubaidov	0
(Russia) Vsevolod Shumkov	5

Final
(Uzbekistan) Abdumalik Khalokov	3
(Russia) Vsevolod Shumkov	4

=== Top half ===
==== Section 1 ====
Round of 64
(Ecuador) Kevin Mosquera	5
(United States) Austin Lenehan	0
Yohenrry Rosario	WO
(Bosnia and Herzegovina) Luka Veljović
(Azerbaijan) Mahammadali Ashiraliyev	5
(Sierra Leone) Wisdom Barnor	0

Round of 32
(Uzbekistan) Abdumalik Khalokov	WO
(Ecuador) Kevin Mosquera
(Spain) Enrique Kakulov	5
(Eswatini) Chawe Gamedze	0
(Georgia (country)) Artyush Gomtsyan	5
Yohenrry Rosario	0
(Azerbaijan) Mahammadali Ashiraliyev	WO
(Tanzania) Rashid Mrema

Round of 16
(Uzbekistan) Abdumalik Khalokov	5
(Spain) Enrique Kakulov	0
(Georgia (country)) Artyush Gomtsyan	0
(Azerbaijan) Mahammadali Ashiraliyev	5

Quarterfinals
(Uzbekistan) Abdumalik Khalokov	5
(Azerbaijan) Mahammadali Ashiraliyev	0

==== Section 2 ====
Round of 64
(Greece) Georgios Pleas	0
(Latvia) Matvejs Prokudins	5
(Nepal) Khagendra Roka Magar	3
(Mali) Abdoul Karim Bathily	4

Round of 32
(Australia) Luke Cassar
(Latvia) Matvejs Prokudins	RSC
(Uganda) Fahad Mulindwa	0
(Kenya) Washington Wandera	5
(Guinea-Bissau) Felix Mendes Junior
(Ghana) Ebenezer Ankrah	RSC
(Mali) Abdoul Karim Bathily	0
(Armenia) Artur Bazeyan	5

Round of 16
(Latvia) Matvejs Prokudins	5
(Kenya) Washington Wandera	0
(Ghana) Ebenezer Ankrah	0
(Armenia) Artur Bazeyan	5

Quarterfinals
(Latvia) Matvejs Prokudins	0
(Armenia) Artur Bazeyan	5

=== Bottom half ===
==== Section 3 ====
Round of 64
(England) Mehdi Sahak	5
(Solomon Islands) Maximillian Makana	0
(Libya) Muayid Abdulhakim Okashah	NC
(Niger) Amadou Hassane Abdoul Majid	NC

Round of 32
(Tajikistan) Akmal Ubaidov	RSC
(England) Mehdi Sahak
(North Macedonia) Alen Rustemovski	5
(Scotland) Nicholas Devlin	0
(Kazakhstan) Serik Temirzhanov	5
(Mongolia) Erdenebatyn Tsendbaatar	0
(Zambia) Andrew Chilata

Round of 16
(Tajikistan) Akmal Ubaidov	5
(North Macedonia) Alen Rustemovski	0
(Kazakhstan) Serik Temirzhanov	KO
(Zambia) Andrew Chilata

Quarterfinals
(Tajikistan) Akmal Ubaidov	5
(Kazakhstan) Serik Temirzhanov	0

==== Section 4 ====
Round of 64
(Albania) Ariol Zeneli	5
(Thailand) Thichakorn Srisakul	0
(Turkmenistan) Yhlas Gylyçjanow	0
(Brazil) Arilson Gonçalves	5
(Malawi) Mphatso Makwinja	0
(Zimbabwe) Mandhlenkosi Marusenga	5

Round of 32
(Kyrgyzstan) Ryspek Bektenov	4
(Albania) Ariol Zeneli	1
(Brazil) Arilson Gonçalves	5
(India) Mohit Thakur	0
(Fiji) Mikaele Ravalaca	0
(Ethiopia) Haymanot Desalegn Zewdu	5
(Zimbabwe) Mandhlenkosi Marusenga
(Russia) Vsevolod Shumkov	RSC

Round of 16
(Kyrgyzstan) Ryspek Bektenov	2
(Brazil) Arilson Gonçalves	5
(Ethiopia) Haymanot Desalegn Zewdu	0
(Russia) Vsevolod Shumkov	5

Quarterfinals
(Brazil) Arilson Gonçalves	0
(Russia) Vsevolod Shumkov	5
