= Samuel Takyi =

Ghanaian boxer (born 2000)

Personal information
- Nationality: Ghanaian
- Born: 23 December 2000 (age 25) Accra, Ghana
- Weight: Featherweight

Boxing career

Boxing record
- Total fights: 2
- Wins: 2
- Win by KO: 2
- Losses: 0
- Draws: 0
- No contests: 0
Medal record
Men's amateur boxing
Representing Ghana
Olympic Games
Bronze medal – third place	2020 Tokyo	Featherweight
African Games
Gold medal – first place	2023 Accra	Light welterweight

Samuel Takyi (born 23 December 2000) is a Ghanaian boxer. He competed in the men's featherweight division in the 2020 Summer Olympics, beating Jean Caicedo of Ecuador in the first round. He went on to defeat David Avila Ceiber of Colombia in the quarter-final, a win which earned him a bronze medal but lost to Duke Ragan of the USA in the semi-final bout.

== Early life and education ==
Takyi is the son of Eunice Smith, who is a fish monger at the Makola Market and Godfred Takyi a cloth trader. He began his education at St. Mary's Nursery & Preparatory School and went on to Bishop Mixed Junior High School. He later joined the Discipline Gym and made it into the Black Bombers team, which is the boxing squad of Ghana. Samuel began to box at the age of 8 and was also good at football but opted for the gloves due to the popularity of the sport in Ussher and Jamestown where he lived.

== Honours ==
Takyi won the 2022 Sports Man of the Year at Citi TV's Entertainment Achievement Awards for the 2021 year under review.
