= Boxing at the 2020 Summer Olympics – Men's featherweight =

Men's featherweight at the Games of the XXXII Olympiad
- Boxing pictogram
- Venue: Ryōgoku Kokugikan
- Dates: 24 July 2021; 5 August 2021
- Competitors: 27 from 27 nations

Medalists
1st place, gold medalist(s)		Albert Batyrgaziev	ROC
2nd place, silver medalist(s)		Duke Ragan	United States
3rd place, bronze medalist(s)		Samuel Takyi	Ghana
3rd place, bronze medalist(s)		Lázaro Álvarez	Cuba

The men's featherweight boxing event at the 2020 Summer Olympics is scheduled to take place between 24 July and 5 August 2021 at the Ryōgoku Kokugikan. 27 boxers from 27 nations are expected to compete.

== Background ==
This will be the 24th appearance of the men's featherweight event. The event appeared at the first Olympic boxing tournament in 1904 and was held at every Games with boxing (that is, excluding 1912) until 2008. In 2012 and 2016, there was no featherweight class; the classes went directly from bantamweight to lightweight. For 2020, the featherweight returns and bantamweight is eliminated. With no bantamweight, the lower end of the featherweight drops to 52 kg; the maximum remains 57 kg.

Reigning World Champion Mirazizbek Mirzakhalilov of Uzbekistan has qualified for the Games. Mirzarkhalilov is a professional with a 1–0 record. The 2016 Olympic bantamweight champion, Robeisy Ramírez of Cuba, defected from the Cuban National Team in 2018 to turn professional and was therefore prevented from attempting to qualify by the Cuban boxing federation.

== Qualification ==
A National Olympic Committee (NOC) could enter only 1 qualified boxer in the weight class. There were 28 quota places available for the men's featherweight, allocated as follows:

- 3 places at the 2020 African Boxing Olympic Qualification Tournament.
- 6 places at the 2020 Asia & Oceania Boxing Olympic Qualification Tournament.
- 8 places at the 2020 European Boxing Olympic Qualification Tournament.
- 5 places that were intended to be awarded at the 2021 Pan American Boxing Olympic Qualification Tournament, which was cancelled. These places were instead awarded through the world ranking list to the top boxers from the Americas who had been registered for the qualification tournament.
- 4 places that were intended to be awarded at a World Olympic Qualifying Tournament, which was cancelled. These places were instead awarded through the world ranking list, with one place for each continental zone (Africa, Asia & Oceania, Europe, Americas).
- 1 place for a Tripartite Commission invitation.

No host places are available in the men's featherweight.

== Competition format ==
Like all Olympic boxing events, the competition is a straight single-elimination tournament. The competition begins with a preliminary round, where the number of competitors is reduced to 16, and concludes with a final. As there are fewer than 32 boxers in the competition, a number of boxers will receive a bye through the preliminary round. Both semifinal losers are awarded bronze medals.

Bouts consist of three three-minute rounds with a one-minute break between rounds. A boxer may win by knockout or by points. Scoring is on the "10-point-must" system, with 5 judges scoring each round. Judges consider "number of blows landed on the target areas, domination of the bout, technique and tactical superiority and competitiveness." Each judge determines a winner for each round, who receives 10 points for the round, and assigns the round's loser a number of points between 7 and 9 based on performance. The judge's scores for each round are added to give a total score for that judge. The boxer with the higher score from a majority of the judges is the winner.

== Schedule ==
The featherweight starts with the round of 32 on 24 July. There are three rest days before the round of 16 on 28 July and three more rest days before the quarterfinals on 1 August. After that, there is only one rest day between rounds with the semifinals on 3 August and the final on 5 August.

Legend

R32	Round of 32	R16	Round of 16	QF	Quarterfinals	SF	Semifinals	F	Final

Date	Jul 24		Jul 25		Jul 26		Jul 27		Jul 28		Jul 29		Jul 30		Jul 31		Aug 1		Aug 2		Aug 3		Aug 4		Aug 5		Aug 6		Aug 7		Aug 8	
Event	A	E	A	E	A	E	A	E	A	E	A	E	A	E	A	E	A	E	A	E	A	E	A	E	A	E	A	E	A	E	A	E
Men's featherweight	R32								R16								QF				SF				F							

== Results ==
=== Finals ===
Final
Duke Ragan (USA)	2
Albert Batyrgaziev (ROC)	3

=== Top half ===
Round of 32
José Quiles (ESP)	0
Kurt Walker (IRL)	5
Roland Gálos (HUN)	0
Serik Temirzhanov (KAZ)	5
Duke Ragan (USA)	3
Samuel Kistohurry (FRA)	2
Mykola Butsenko (UKR)	2
Jean Caicedo (ECU)	3
Mohammad Al-Wadi (JOR)	0
Ceiber Ávila (COL)	5

Round of 16
Mirazizbek Mirzakhalilov (UZB)	1
Kurt Walker (IRL)	4
Serik Temirzhanov (KAZ)	0
Duke Ragan (USA)	5
Samuel Takyi (GHA)	5
Jean Caicedo (ECU)	0
Ceiber Ávila (COL)	3
Everisto Mulenga (ZAM)	2

Quarterfinals
Kurt Walker (IRL)	2
Duke Ragan (USA)	3
Samuel Takyi (GHA)	3
Ceiber Ávila (COL)	2

Semifinals
Duke Ragan (USA)	4
Samuel Takyi (GHA)	1

=== Bottom half ===
Round of 32
Danial Shahbakhsh (IRI)	5
Mohamed Hamout (MAR)	0
Chatchai-decha Butdee (THA)	5
Peter McGrail (GBR)	0
Mirko Cuello (ARG)	3
Hamsat Shadalov (GER)	2
Nguyễn Văn Đương (VIE)	3
Tayfur Aliyev (AZE)	2
Erdenebatyn Tsendbaatar (MGL)	3
Nick Okoth (KEN)	2
Keevin Allicock (GUY)	0
Alexy de la Cruz (DOM)	5

Round of 16
Lázaro Álvarez (CUB)	RSC
Danial Shahbakhsh (IRI)
Chatchai-decha Butdee (THA)	4
Mirko Cuello (ARG)	1
Nguyễn Văn Đương (VIE)	0
Erdenebatyn Tsendbaatar (MGL)	5
Alexy de la Cruz (DOM)	0
Albert Batyrgaziev (ROC)	5

Quarterfinals
Lázaro Álvarez (CUB)	3
Chatchai-decha Butdee (THA)	2
Erdenebatyn Tsendbaatar (MGL)	2
Albert Batyrgaziev (ROC)	3

Semifinals
Lázaro Álvarez (CUB)	2
Albert Batyrgaziev (ROC)	3
