= 2024 European Amateur Boxing Championships =

Boxing competitions

- Venue: Aleksandar Nikolić Hall
- Location: Belgrade, Serbia
- Dates: 18–28 April
- Competitors: 337 from 34 nations

The 45th Men's 2024 European Amateur Boxing Championships and 14th European Women's Boxing Championships were held at the same time in Belgrade, Serbia, from 18 to 28 April 2024. 401 boxers (263 men and 138 women) from 33 countries were scheduled to come to Belgrade for this championships.

== Medal table ==
* Host nation (Serbia)

Rank	Nation	Gold	Silver	Bronze	Total
1	Russia	11	8	1	20
2	Serbia*	4	3	13	20
3	Turkey	3	0	2	5
4	Bulgaria	2	3	6	11
5	Ireland	2	0	2	4
6	Croatia	1	1	1	3
6	Moldova	1	1	1	3
8	Spain	1	0	1	2
9	Armenia	0	2	5	7
10	Hungary	0	2	4	6
11	Georgia	0	2	0	2
12	Belarus	0	1	2	3
12	France	0	1	2	3
14	Romania	0	1	1	2
15	Italy	0	0	3	3
16	Azerbaijan	0	0	2	2
16	Slovakia	0	0	2	2
18	Lithuania	0	0	1	1
18	Montenegro	0	0	1	1
Totals (19 entries)		25	25	50	100

== Medalists ==
=== Men ===
Event	Gold	Silver	Bronze
Minimumweight (46–48 kg)	Edmond Khudoyan; Russia	Baregham Harutyunyan; Armenia	Ergyunal Sebahtin; Bulgaria
Minimumweight (46–48 kg)	Edmond Khudoyan; Russia	Baregham Harutyunyan; Armenia	Rade Joksimović; Serbia
Flyweight (48–51 kg)	Samet Gümüş; Turkey	Attila Bernáth; Hungary	Omer Ametović; Serbia
Flyweight (48–51 kg)	Samet Gümüş; Turkey	Attila Bernáth; Hungary	Rafael Lozano Serrano; Spain
Bantamweight (51–54 kg)	Dmitry Dvali; Russia	Billal Bennama; France	Yasen Radev; Bulgaria
Bantamweight (51–54 kg)	Dmitry Dvali; Russia	Billal Bennama; France	Gábor Virbán; Hungary
Featherweight (54–57 kg)	Eduard Savvin; Russia	Javier Ibáñez; Bulgaria	Artur Bazeyan; Armenia
Featherweight (54–57 kg)	Eduard Savvin; Russia	Javier Ibáñez; Bulgaria	Samuel Kistohurry; France
Lightweight (57–60 kg)	Vsevolod Shumkov; Russia	Radoslav Rosenov; Bulgaria	Tomislav Đinović; Montenegro
Lightweight (57–60 kg)	Vsevolod Shumkov; Russia	Radoslav Rosenov; Bulgaria	Artur Sahakyan; Armenia
Light welterweight (60–63.5 kg)	Gabil Mamedov; Russia	Alexandru Paraschiv; Moldova	Richárd Kovács; Hungary
Light welterweight (60–63.5 kg)	Gabil Mamedov; Russia	Alexandru Paraschiv; Moldova	Malik Hasanov; Azerbaijan
Welterweight (63.5–67 kg)	Tarkhan Idigov; Russia	Lasha Guruli; Georgia	Ararat Harutyunyan; Armenia
Welterweight (63.5–67 kg)	Tarkhan Idigov; Russia	Lasha Guruli; Georgia	Vahid Abasov; Serbia
Light middleweight (67–71 kg)	Jovan Nikolić; Serbia	Eskerkhan Madiev; Georgia	Vasile Cebotari; Moldova
Light middleweight (67–71 kg)	Jovan Nikolić; Serbia	Eskerkhan Madiev; Georgia	Tuğrulhan Erdemir; Turkey
Middleweight (71–75 kg)	Rami Mofid Kiwan; Bulgaria	Dzhambulat Bizhamov; Russia	Remo Salvati; Italy
Middleweight (71–75 kg)	Rami Mofid Kiwan; Bulgaria	Dzhambulat Bizhamov; Russia	Almir Memić; Serbia
Light heavyweight (75–80 kg)	Gabrijel Veočić; Croatia	Rastko Simić; Serbia	Yojerlin César; France
Light heavyweight (75–80 kg)	Gabrijel Veočić; Croatia	Rastko Simić; Serbia	Savelii Sadoma; Russia
Cruiserweight (80–86 kg)	Sharabutdin Ataev; Russia	Aliaksei Alfiorau; Belarus	Veljko Ražnatović; Serbia
Cruiserweight (80–86 kg)	Sharabutdin Ataev; Russia	Aliaksei Alfiorau; Belarus	Vincenzo Lizzi; Italy
Heavyweight (86–92 kg)	Muslim Gadzhimagomedov; Russia	Narek Manasyan; Armenia	Sadam Magomedov; Serbia
Heavyweight (86–92 kg)	Muslim Gadzhimagomedov; Russia	Narek Manasyan; Armenia	Loren Alfonso; Azerbaijan
Super heavyweight (+92 kg)	Ayoub Ghadfa; Spain	Dušan Veletić; Serbia	Yordan Hernández; Bulgaria
Super heavyweight (+92 kg)	Ayoub Ghadfa; Spain	Dušan Veletić; Serbia	Luka Pratljačić; Croatia

=== Women ===
Event	Gold	Silver	Bronze
Minimumweight (–48 kg)	Iuliia Chumgalakova; Russia	Kristina Nađ Varga; Serbia	Giovanna Marchese; Italy
Minimumweight (–48 kg)	Iuliia Chumgalakova; Russia	Kristina Nađ Varga; Serbia	Sevda Asenova; Bulgaria
Light flyweight (–50 kg)	Shannon Sweeney; Ireland	Zlatislava Chukanova; Bulgaria	Anush Grigoryan; Armenia
Light flyweight (–50 kg)	Shannon Sweeney; Ireland	Zlatislava Chukanova; Bulgaria	Nina Radovanović; Serbia
Flyweight (–52 kg)	Buse Naz Çakıroğlu; Turkey	Anastasiia Kool; Russia	Venelina Poptoleva; Bulgaria
Flyweight (–52 kg)	Buse Naz Çakıroğlu; Turkey	Anastasiia Kool; Russia	Dragana Jovanović; Serbia
Bantamweight (–54 kg)	Sara Ćirković; Serbia	Lăcrămioara Perijoc; Romania	Hanna Lakotár; Hungary
Bantamweight (–54 kg)	Sara Ćirković; Serbia	Lăcrămioara Perijoc; Romania	Niamh Fay; Ireland
Featherweight (–57 kg)	Svetlana Staneva; Bulgaria	Daria Abramova; Russia	Claudia Nechita; Romania
Featherweight (–57 kg)	Svetlana Staneva; Bulgaria	Daria Abramova; Russia	Anđela Branković; Serbia
Lightweight (–60 kg)	Natalia Shadrina; Serbia	Nune Asatrian; Russia	Kellie Harrington; Ireland
Lightweight (–60 kg)	Natalia Shadrina; Serbia	Nune Asatrian; Russia	Ana Starovoitova; Lithuania
Light welterweight (–63 kg)	Kristina Kaluhova; Serbia	Elena Babicheva; Russia	Tamara Kubalová; Slovakia
Light welterweight (–63 kg)	Kristina Kaluhova; Serbia	Elena Babicheva; Russia	Aslahan Mehmedova; Bulgaria
Welterweight (–66 kg)	Busenaz Sürmeneli; Turkey	Albina Moldazhanova; Russia	Jessica Triebeľová; Slovakia
Welterweight (–66 kg)	Busenaz Sürmeneli; Turkey	Albina Moldazhanova; Russia	Milena Matović; Serbia
Light middleweight (–70 kg)	Darima Sandakova; Russia	Regina Lakos; Hungary	Ani Hovsepyan; Armenia
Light middleweight (–70 kg)	Darima Sandakova; Russia	Regina Lakos; Hungary	Aryna Danilchyk; Belarus
Middleweight (–75 kg)	Aoife O'Rourke; Ireland	Anastasiia Shamonova; Russia	Büşra Işıldar; Turkey
Middleweight (–75 kg)	Aoife O'Rourke; Ireland	Anastasiia Shamonova; Russia	Nikolina Gajić; Serbia
Light heavyweight (–81 kg)	Elena Gapeshina; Russia	Lucija Bilobrk; Croatia	Victoriya Kebikava; Belarus
Light heavyweight (–81 kg)	Elena Gapeshina; Russia	Lucija Bilobrk; Croatia	Elma Hajrović; Serbia
Heavyweight (+81 kg)	Daria Kozorez; Moldova	Kristina Tkacheva; Russia	Réka Hoffmann; Hungary
Heavyweight (+81 kg)	Daria Kozorez; Moldova	Kristina Tkacheva; Russia	Sara Miljković; Serbia

== Participating nations ==
Nation	Men													Women												Total
Nation	48 kg	51 kg	54 kg	57 kg	60 kg	63.5 kg	67 kg	71 kg	75 kg	80 kg	86 kg	92 kg	+92 kg	48 kg	50 kg	52 kg	54 kg	57 kg	60 kg	63 kg	66 kg	70 kg	75 kg	81 kg	+81 kg	Total
Albania				Yes				Yes	Yes	Yes		Yes														5
Armenia	Yes	Yes	Yes	Yes	Yes	Yes	Yes	Yes	Yes	Yes	Yes	Yes	Yes	Yes	Yes		Yes		Yes	Yes		Yes				19
Austria										Yes			Yes													2
Azerbaijan	Yes	Yes	Yes	Yes	Yes	Yes	Yes	Yes	Yes	Yes	Yes	Yes	Yes	Yes	Yes	Yes		Yes			Yes					18
Belarus			Yes	Yes	Yes	Yes		Yes	Yes		Yes	Yes			Yes	Yes			Yes			Yes	Yes	Yes		14
Belgium				Yes				Yes	Yes	Yes	Yes	Yes									Yes					7
Bosnia and Herzegovina				Yes	Yes	Yes	Yes	Yes	Yes				Yes													7
Bulgaria	Yes		Yes	Yes	Yes				Yes	Yes			Yes	Yes	Yes	Yes	Yes	Yes		Yes						13
Croatia				Yes	Yes	Yes	Yes	Yes	Yes	Yes	Yes		Yes					Yes	Yes	Yes				Yes		13
Czech Republic																	Yes									1
Estonia					Yes			Yes		Yes	Yes															4
France			Yes	Yes	Yes		Yes	Yes		Yes		Yes	Yes	Yes				Yes								10
Georgia	Yes	Yes	Yes	Yes	Yes	Yes	Yes	Yes	Yes			Yes														10
Greece			Yes	Yes			Yes	Yes		Yes	Yes	Yes	Yes			Yes			Yes	Yes						11
Hungary		Yes	Yes	Yes	Yes	Yes	Yes	Yes	Yes	Yes		Yes		Yes	Yes	Yes	Yes	Yes	Yes	Yes	Yes	Yes	Yes		Yes	21
International Boxing Association						Yes														Yes						2
Ireland		Yes		Yes		Yes		Yes				Yes			Yes		Yes	Yes	Yes		Yes		Yes			11
Israel								Yes	Yes			Yes														3
Italy			Yes	Yes	Yes	Yes		Yes	Yes	Yes	Yes			Yes			Yes		Yes	Yes			Yes			13
Lithuania						Yes		Yes		Yes		Yes	Yes						Yes				Yes			7
Malta		Yes	Yes	Yes																Yes						4
Moldova	Yes			Yes	Yes	Yes	Yes	Yes	Yes	Yes	Yes	Yes	Yes			Yes	Yes		Yes						Yes	15
Montenegro					Yes			Yes		Yes			Yes									Yes				5
North Macedonia				Yes		Yes	Yes			Yes																4
Poland	Yes			Yes	Yes		Yes	Yes	Yes	Yes	Yes	Yes			Yes	Yes	Yes	Yes	Yes			Yes	Yes			16
Romania		Yes				Yes		Yes	Yes		Yes				Yes		Yes	Yes		Yes	Yes	Yes				11
Russia	Yes	Yes	Yes	Yes	Yes	Yes	Yes	Yes	Yes	Yes	Yes	Yes	Yes	Yes	Yes	Yes	Yes	Yes	Yes	Yes	Yes	Yes	Yes	Yes	Yes	25
Scotland					Yes		Yes					Yes														3
Serbia	Yes	Yes	Yes		Yes	Yes	Yes	Yes	Yes	Yes	Yes	Yes	Yes	Yes	Yes	Yes	Yes	Yes	Yes	Yes	Yes	Yes	Yes	Yes	Yes	24
Slovakia						Yes		Yes			Yes	Yes		Yes					Yes	Yes	Yes					8
Slovenia					Yes		Yes						Yes													3
Spain		Yes				Yes		Yes		Yes	Yes		Yes	Yes	Yes	Yes	Yes	Yes	Yes		Yes		Yes			14
Switzerland												Yes								Yes						2
Turkey		Yes		Yes		Yes		Yes		Yes		Yes				Yes	Yes	Yes	Yes		Yes		Yes			12
Total (34 entries)	8	11	12	20	18	19	15	25	17	21	15	20	15	10	11	11	13	12	15	13	10	8	10	4	4	337
