= Savelii Sadoma =

Russian boxer (born 1998)

Personal information
- Nationality: Russia
- Born: 12 October 1998 (age 27)

Boxing career
Medal record
Men's amateur boxing
Representing (Russia) Russian Boxing Federation
IBA World Championships
Bronze medal – third place	2021 Belgrade	Light heavyweight
Representing Russia
European Championships
Bronze medal – third place	2024 Belgrade	Light heavyweight

Savelii Sadoma (born 12 October 1998) is a Russian boxer. He competed at the 2021 AIBA World Boxing Championships, winning the bronze medal in the light heavyweight event.
