= Nebil Ibrahim =

Swedish boxer (born 2000)

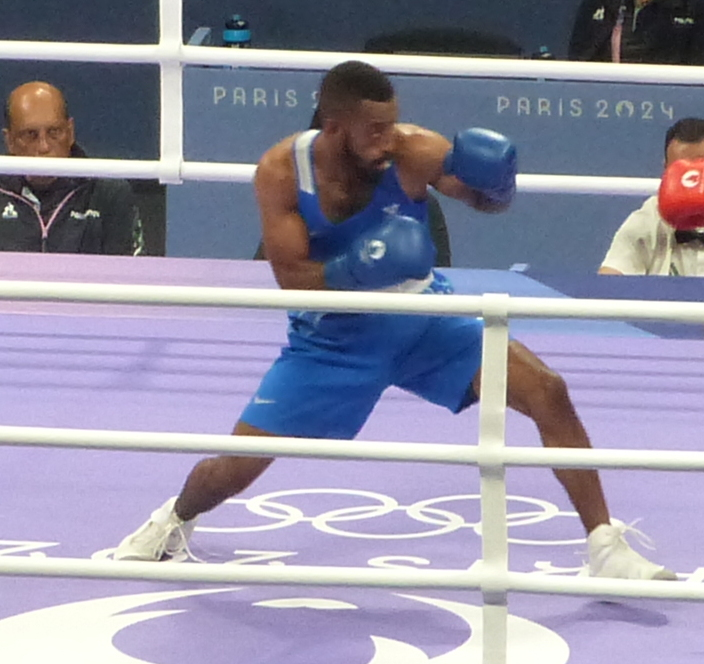
- Ibrahim at the 2024 Summer Olympics

Personal information
- Nationality: Swedish
- Born: Nebil Mahmud Ibrahim; 2 December 2000 (age 25) Uppsala, Sweden
- Home town: Uppsala, Sweden
- Height: 1.72 m (5 ft 8 in)

Sport
- Country: Sweden
- Sport: Boxing
- Position: Orthodox
- Weight class: Featherweight (−57 kg)
- Club: Upsala IF
- Coached by: Mosa Sayed
Medal record
Men's boxing
Representing Sweden
European Games
| Bronze medal – third place | 2023 Kraków-Małopolska | Featherweight |
- Updated on 29 July 2024

Nebil Mahmud Ibrahim (Swedish pronunciation: [nɛˈbiːl ˈɪ̌bːrahɪm, - ˈǐːbra-]; born 2 December 2000) is a Swedish featherweight boxer. He competed at the 2024 Paris Olympics.

== Early life ==
Ibrahim was born in Uppsala within a family of boxers – one of them being his maternal uncle Mosa Sayed, who is also his trainer. He grew up between the Uppsala boroughs of Gränby and Stenhagen.

== Career ==
Ibrahim started practicing boxing as early as the age of 12. After winning the Swedish Junior Championship in 2017, he won the Swedish Championship in 2019, 2020, 2021 and 2022, and went on to become Nordic champion in 2023. He came fifth in his category at the 2022 Amateur Championships in Yerevan.

As the bronze medallist in his category at the 2023 European Games in Poland, Ibrahim qualified to represent Sweden at the 2024 Summer Olympics in Paris, where he was eliminated in the round of 16.
