= Aliaksei Alfiorau =

Belarusian boxer (born 2000)

Personal information
- Nationality: Belarus
- Born: 23 February 2000 (age 26)

Boxing career
Medal record
Men's amateur boxing
Representing Belarus
IBA World Championships
Silver medal – second place	2021 Belgrade	Light heavyweight
Silver medal – second place	2025 Dubai	Cruiserweight
European Championships
Silver medal – second place	2024 Belgrade	Cruiserweight
Youth World Championships
Bronze medal – third place	2018 Budapest	Light-heavyweight
European Youth Championships
Silver medal – second place	2018 Roseto	Light-heavyweight

Aliaksei Alfiorau (born 23 February 2000) is a Belarusian boxer. He competed at the 2021 AIBA World Boxing Championships, winning the silver medal in the light heavyweight event. He also competed at the 2024 European Amateur Boxing Championships, winning the silver medal in the cruiserweight event.
