= Robby Gonzales =

American boxer

Rahim Gonzales
Personal information
- Nationality: United States

Boxing career
Medal record
Men's amateur boxing
Representing United States
IBA World Championships
Gold medal – first place	2021 Belgrade	Light heavyweight

Robby Gonzales is an American boxer. He competed at the 2021 AIBA World Boxing Championships, winning the gold medal in the light heavyweight event.
