= Remo Salvati =

Italian boxer (born 1998)

Personal information
- Nationality: Italy
- Born: 20 April 1998 (age 28)

Boxing career
Medal record
Men's amateur boxing
Representing Italy
European Championships
Bronze medal – third place	2024 Belgrade	Middleweight

Remo Salvati (born 20 April 1998) is an Italian boxer. He competed at the 2024 European Amateur Boxing Championships, winning the bronze medal in the middleweight event.
