= Duke Ragan =

American boxer (born 1997)

Personal information
- Born: September 18, 1997 (age 28) Cincinnati, Ohio, U.S.
- Height: 5 ft 5 in (165 cm)
- Weight: Featherweight

Boxing career
- Stance: Orthodox

Boxing record
- Total fights: 9
- Wins: 9
- Win by KO: 1
Medal record
Men's amateur boxing
Representing United States
Olympic Games
Silver medal – second place	2020 Tokyo	Featherweight
World Championships
Silver medal – second place	2017 Hamburg	Bantamweight
Pan American Games
Silver medal – second place	2019 Lima	Bantamweight
Pan American Championship
Bronze medal – third place	2017 Tegucigalpa	Lightweight

Duke Ragan (born September 18, 1997) is an American professional boxer who won a silver medal in the featherweight division at the 2020 Summer Olympics in Tokyo.

== Amateur/Olympic career ==
After learning the sport at the Cincinnati Golden Gloves boxing club in the Over-the-Rhine neighborhood of his hometown, Ragan won silver medals at the 2017 World Championships and the 2019 Pan American Games as an amateur in the bantamweight division. In June 2021, less than a year after he turned pro, Ragan qualified for the postponed Tokyo Olympics as a featherweight based on the ranking points he had accumulated during the previous years.

Ragan won his first four bouts in Tokyo to qualify for the gold medal bout, beating seeded Samuel Kistohurry and Serik Temirzhanov in the process. He lost the Olympic final 3–2 to fellow professional Albert Batyrgaziev of the Russian team. Ragan won the third round on four of the five judges' scorecards, but attributed his defeat to a slow start.

Ragan still became the first professional boxer to win a medal for the U.S. team. He also became only the second silver medalist for the American men's team since 2004, joining Shakur Stevenson.

== Professional career ==
Ragan turned pro in July 2020 with James Prince as his manager. He was initially set to make his debut on August 8. In August, he signed a multi-year promotional contract with Bob Arum's Top Rank, with his rescheduled debut set for August 22 against Luis Alvarado on the undercard of Eleider Alvarez vs. Joe Smith Jr. at the MGM Grand Conference Center in Paradise, Nevada. Ragan knocked Alvarado down with a right hand in the first round. He made it back to his feet before referee Jay Nady's count of ten. Disorientated, Alavarado turned his back on Nady which prompted him to call a halt to the contest, handing Ragan a first-round technical knockout (TKO) victory.

== Professional boxing record ==
9 fights	9 wins	0 losses
By knockout	1	0
By decision	8	0

No.	Result	Record	Opponent	Type	Round, time	Date	Location	Notes
9	Win	9–0	Jose Perez	SD	8	Oct 14, 2023	Fort Bend Epicenter, Rosenberg, Texas, U.S.	
8	Win	8–0	Luis Lebron	UD	8	Oct 29, 2022	Madison Square Garden, New York City, New York, U.S.	
7	Win	7–0	D'Angelo Fuentes	UD	6	Aug 13, 2022	Resorts World Las Vegas, Winchester, Nevada, U.S.	
6	Win	6–0	Victorino Gonzalez	UD	4	May 21, 2022	Resorts World Las Vegas, Winchester, Nevada, U.S.	
5	Win	5–0	Diuhl Olguin	UD	6	Apr 9, 2022	The Hangar, Costa Mesa, California, U.S.	
4	Win	4–0	Charles Clark	UD	6	Apr 10, 2021	Osage Casino, Tulsa, Oklahoma, U.S.	
3	Win	3–0	Sebastian Gutierrez	UD	4	Nov 14, 2020	MGM Grand Conference Center, Paradise, Nevada, U.S.	
2	Win	2–0	John Moraga	UD	4	Oct 3, 2020	MGM Grand Conference Center, Paradise, Nevada, U.S.	
1	Win	1–0	Luis Alvarado	TKO	1 (4), 0:42	Aug 22, 2020	MGM Grand Conference Center, Paradise, Nevada, U.S.	
