= Boxing at the 2023 European Games – Men's featherweight =

Men's featherweight boxing at the 2023 European Games
- Venue: Nowy Targ Arena
- Location: Nowy Targ, Poland
- Dates: 23 June – 2 July
- Competitors: 26 from 26 nations

Medalists
gold medal	Javier Ibáñez	Bulgaria
silver medal	José Quiles	Spain
bronze medal	Nebil Ibrahim	Sweden
bronze medal	Vasile Usturoi	Belgium

The men's featherweight boxing event at the 2023 European Games was held between 23 June and 2 July 2023.

== Results ==
=== Finals ===
Semi-finals
Javier Ibáñez (BUL)	4
Nebil Ibrahim (SWE)	1
Vasile Usturoi (BEL)	0
José Quiles (ESP)	5

Final
Javier Ibáñez (BUL)	5
José Quiles (ESP)	0

=== Top half ===
==== Section 1 ====
Round of 32
Vladimír Trakal (CZE)	0
Artur Bazeyan (ARM)	5
Jude Gallagher (IRL)	1
Javier Ibáñez (BUL)	4
Taras Bondarchuk (UKR)	5
Alen Rahimić (BIH)	0

Round of 16
Matvejs Prokudins (LAT)	0
Artur Bazeyan (ARM)	4
Javier Ibáñez (BUL)	5
Taras Bondarchuk (UKR)	0

Quarterfinals
Artur Bazeyan (ARM)	0
Javier Ibáñez (BUL)	5

==== Section 2 ====
Round of 32
Roland Veres (HUN)	5
Umid Rustamov (AZE)	0
Alen Rustemovski (MKD)	1
Nebil Ibrahim (SWE)	4

Round of 16
Murat Yildirim (GER)	1
Roland Veres (HUN)	4
Nebil Ibrahim (SWE)	5
Farid Walizadeh (EOR)	0

Quarterfinals
Roland Veres (HUN)
Nebil Ibrahim (SWE)	RSC

=== Bottom half ===
==== Section 3 ====
Round of 32
Victor Vacula (MDA)	2
Ardit Murja (ALB)	3
Jack Dryden (GBR)	5
Riad Labidi (FRA)	0

Round of 16
Vasile Usturoi (BEL)	5
Ardit Murja (ALB)	0
Jack Dryden (GBR)	0
Frederik Lundgaard Jensen (DEN)	5

Quarterfinals
Vasile Usturoi (BEL)	RSC
Frederik Lundgaard Jensen (DEN)

==== Section 4 ====
Round of 32
José Quiles (ESP)	5
Andrei Gavae (ROU)	0
Batuhan Çiftçi (TUR)	5
Kirill Serikov (EST)	0
Jarosław Iwanow (POL)	4
Michele Baldassi (ITA)	1

Round of 16
José Quiles (ESP)	5
Batuhan Çiftçi (TUR)	0
Jarosław Iwanow (POL)	1
Artush Gomtsyan (GEO)	4

Quarterfinals
José Quiles (ESP)	4
Artush Gomtsyan (GEO)	1
