= Vladimir Mironchikov =

Serbian boxer (born 1998)

Personal information
- Nationality: {{{s}}}, [[{{{slan}}}]]
- Born: 30 September 1998 (age 27)

Boxing career
Medal record
Men's amateur boxing
Representing Serbia
IBA World Championships
Bronze medal – third place	2021 Belgrade	Light heavyweight
Mediterranean Games
Gold medal – first place	2022 Oran	Light heavyweight

Vladimir Sergeyevich Mironchikov (Russian: Владимир Сергеевич Мирончиков, Serbian: Владимир Мирончиков / Vladimir Mirončikov; born 30 September 1998) is a Serbian boxer. He competed at the 2021 AIBA World Boxing Championships, winning the bronze medal in the light heavyweight event.
