= Sofiane Oumiha =

French boxer (born 1994)

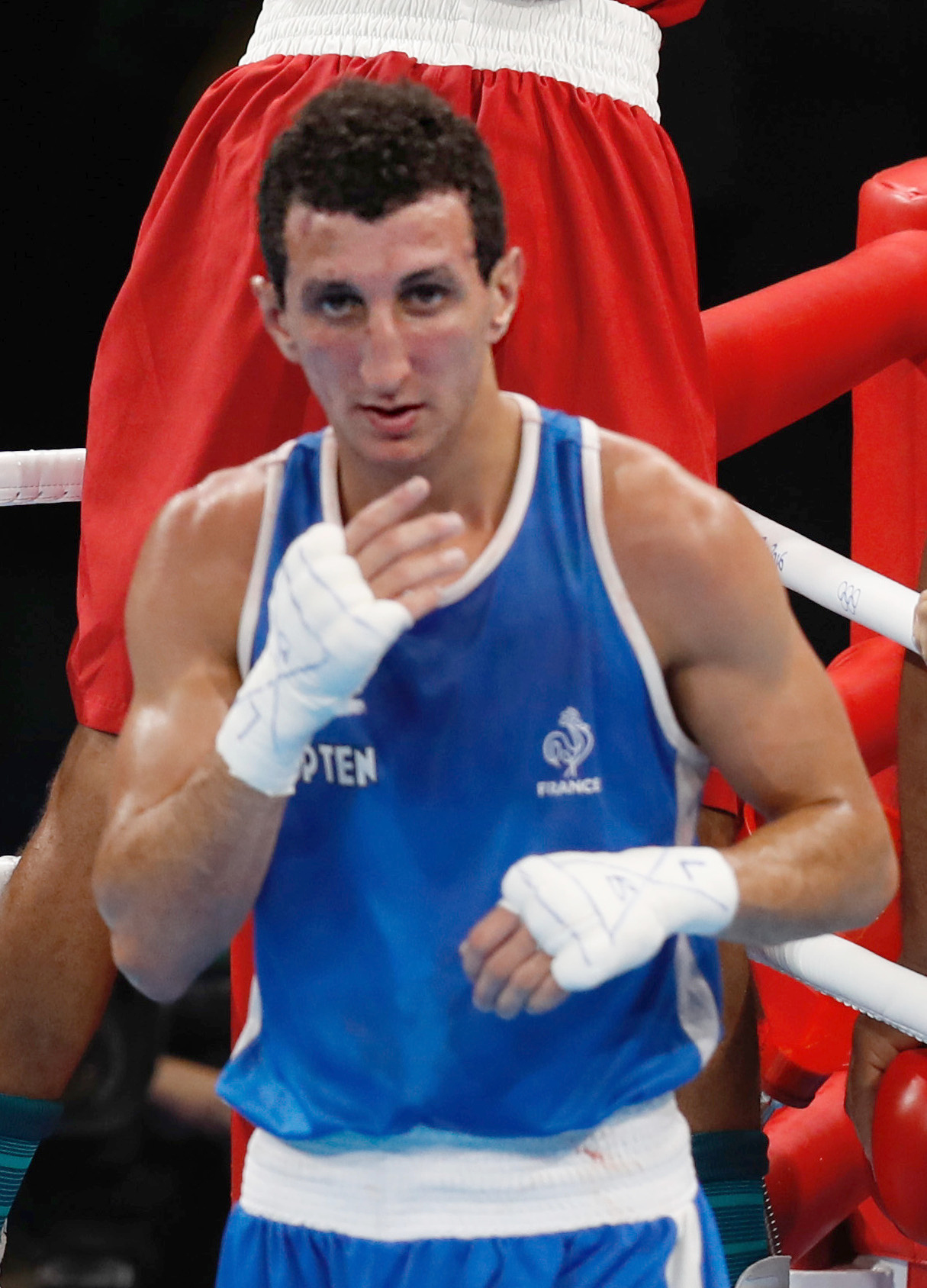
- Oumiha at the 2016 Summer Olympics

Personal information
- Born: 23 December 1994 (age 31) Toulouse, France
- Height: 1.78 m (5 ft 10 in)
- Weight: 60 kg (132 lb)

Boxing career
- Weight class: Lightweight, Light welterweight

Boxing record
- Total fights: 9
- Wins: 8
- Win by KO: 3
- Losses: 1
Medal record
Men's amateur boxing
Representing France
Olympic Games
Silver medal – second place	2016 Rio de Janeiro	Lightweight
Silver medal – second place	2024 Paris	Lightweight
World Championships
Gold medal – first place	2017 Hamburg	Lightweight
Gold medal – first place	2021 Belgrade	Lightweight
Gold medal – first place	2023 Tashkent	Lightweight
European Games
Gold medal – first place	2023 Kraków-Małopolska	Light welterweight
Silver medal – second place	2015 Baku	Lightweight
Silver medal – second place	2019 Minsk	Light welterweight
EU Championships
Gold medal – first place	2018 Valladolid	Lightweight
Mediterranean Games
Gold medal – first place	2013 Mersin	Lightweight
Gold medal – first place	2018 Tarragona	Lightweight
Youth World Championships
Bronze medal – third place	2012 Yerevan	Lightweight

Sofiane Oumiha (born 23 December 1994) is a French lightweight boxer. He won silver medals at the 2015 European Games and at the 2016 Summer Olympics and at the 2024 Paris Olympics.

== Professional career ==
Oumiha was scheduled to make his professional debut on 6 March 2021, at Queensberry Poland in Lublin. The fight was canceled with his team hoping for a new date later that year in England.

== Personal life ==
Born in France, Oumiha is of Moroccan descent.

== Professional boxing record ==
9 fights	8 wins	1 loss
By knockout	3	0
By decision	5	1

No.	Result	Record	Opponent	Type	Round, time	Date	Location	Notes
9	Win	8–1	Freddy Lainez	UD	10	15 Aug 2026	Casino Buenos Aires, Buenos Aires, Argentina	Retained WBA Fedelatin USA super featherweight title
8	Win	7–1	Angel Rodriguez	UD	10	24 Apr 2026	Gimnasio Club Mexico, Santiago, Chile	Won vacant WBA Fedelatin USA super featherweight title
7	Loss	6–1	Francisco Fonseca	UD	10	8 Aug 2025	Benina Martyrs Stadium, Benghazi, Libya	
6	Win	6–0	Edivaldo Ortega	UD	10	27 Apr 2025	Borik Sports Hall, Banja Luka, Bosnia and Herzegovina	
5	Win	5–0	Jose Angel Napoles	UD	10	2 Dec 2023	Palais des Sports de Marseille, Marseille, France	
4	Win	4–0	Nicolas Ariel Blanco	TKO	6 (10), 2:59	23 Sep 2023	Chapiteau de l'Espace Fontvieille, Fontvieille, Monaco	
3	Win	3–0	Victor Julio	KO	2 (8), 3:00	19 Nov 2022	La Palestre, Le Cannet, France	
2	Win	2–0	Mevy Boufoudi	UD	8	14 May 2022	Accor Arena, Paris, France	
1	Win	1–0	Anderson Rangel	TKO	4 (6), 3:00	26 Feb 2022	Centro Deportivo Municipal Mundet, Barcelona, Spain	
