= Osvel Caballero =

Cuban boxer

Personal information
- Born: Osvel David Caballero Garcia; June 22, 1995 (age 31) Lajas, Cuba
- Weight: Super featherweight

Boxing career
- Stance: Orthodox

Boxing record
- Total fights: 3
- Wins: 3
- Win by KO: 2
- Losses: 0
Medal record
Men's amateur boxing
Representing Cuba
Pan American Games
Gold medal – first place	2019 Lima	Men's 56 kg
IBA World Championships
Bronze medal – third place	2021 Belgrade	Featherweight

Osvel Caballero is a Cuban boxer. He competed at the 2021 AIBA World Boxing Championships, winning the gold medal in the featherweight division.

== Professional boxing career ==
Caballero made his professional debut against Jhosman Reyes Gutierrez on 20 May 2022. He won the fight by a fourth-round knockout. He would notch two more victories that year, a second-round technical knockout of Pedro Pineda on 29 July and a unanimous decision against Gerson Escobar Romero on 30 October 2022.

== Professional boxing record ==
3 fights	3 wins	0 losses
By knockout	2	0
By decision	1	0

No.	Result	Record	Opponent	Type	Round, time	Date	Location	Notes
3	Win	3–0	Gerson Escobar Romero	UD	8	30 Oct 2022	Ocho Segundos Western Club, Aguascalientes, Mexico	
2	Win	2–0	Pedro Pineda	TKO	3 (8), 2:40	29 Jul 2022	Coliseo Elias Chegwin, Barranquilla, Colombia	
1	Win	1–0	Jhosman Reyes Gutierrez	KO	4 (6), 2:52	20 May 2022	Palenque de la FNSM, Aguascalientes, Mexico	
