= Alexy de la Cruz =

Dominican Republic boxer (born 1995)

Personal information
- Full name: Alexy Miguel de la Cruz Báez
- Nationality: Dominican
- Born: 11 December 1995 (age 30)

Sport
- Sport: Boxing
Medal record
Men's amateur boxing
Representing Dominican Republic
World Championships
Bronze medal – third place	2021 Belgrade	Lightweight
Pan American Games
Bronze medal – third place	2019 Lima	Bantamweight
Bronze medal – third place	2023 Santiago	Lightweight
Bolivarian Games
Gold medal – first place	2022 Valledupar	Lightweight

Alexy Miguel de la Cruz Báez (born 11 December 1995) is a Dominican Republic boxer. He competed in the men's featherweight event at the 2020 Summer Olympics.
