= José Quiles =

Spanish boxer (born 1997)

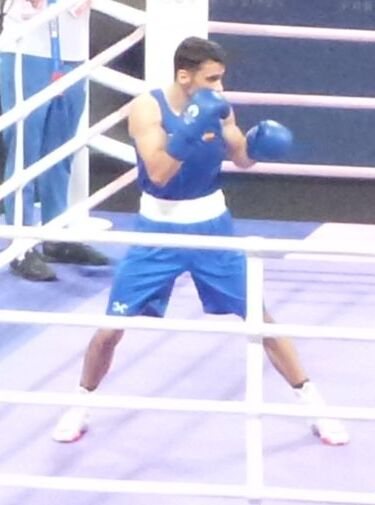
- Quiles in 2024

Personal information
- Full name: José Quiles Brotons
- Born: 19 October 1997 (age 28) Elda, Spain
- Height: 172 cm (5 ft 8 in)
- Weight: 60 kg (132 lb)

Sport
- Country: Spain
- Sport: Boxing
- Weight class: Featherweight
Medal record
Men's amateur boxing
Representing Spain
European Games
Silver medal – second place	2023 Kraków-Małopolska	Featherweight
European Championships
Silver medal – second place	2022 Yerevan	Lightweight
Bronze medal – third place	2017 Kharkiv	Bantamweight

José Quiles Brotons (Note: In this Spanish name, the first or paternal surname is Quiles and the second or maternal family name is Brotons.) (born 19 October 1997) is a Spanish boxer. He won the silver medal in the men's featherweight event at the 2023 European Games held in Poland. He competed in the men's featherweight event at the 2020 Summer Olympics held in Tokyo, Japan and the men's featherweight event at the 2024 Summer Olympics held in Paris, France.

In 2019, he competed in the men's 56 kg event at the European Games held in Minsk, Belarus.
