= Danial Shahbakhsh =

Iranian boxer (born 2000)

Personal information
- Nationality: Iranian
- Born: 18 March 2000 (age 26) Zahedan, Iran

Sport
- Sport: Boxing
- Coached by: Alireza Esteki
Medal record
Men's amateur boxing
Representing Iran
World Championships
Bronze medal – third place	2021 Belgrade	Lightweight
Asian Championships
Silver medal – second place	2021 Dubai	Lightweight
Islamic Solidarity Games
Bronze medal – third place	2025 Riyadh	Lightweight

Danial Shahbakhsh (Persian: دانیال شه‌بخش; born 18 March 2000) is an Iranian boxer. In 2021, he competed in the men's featherweight event at the 2020 Summer Olympics, then became the first Iranian boxer to win a medal at the World Championships.
