= Albert Batyrgaziev =

Russian boxer (born 1998)

Albert Batyrgaziev Альберт Батыргазиев
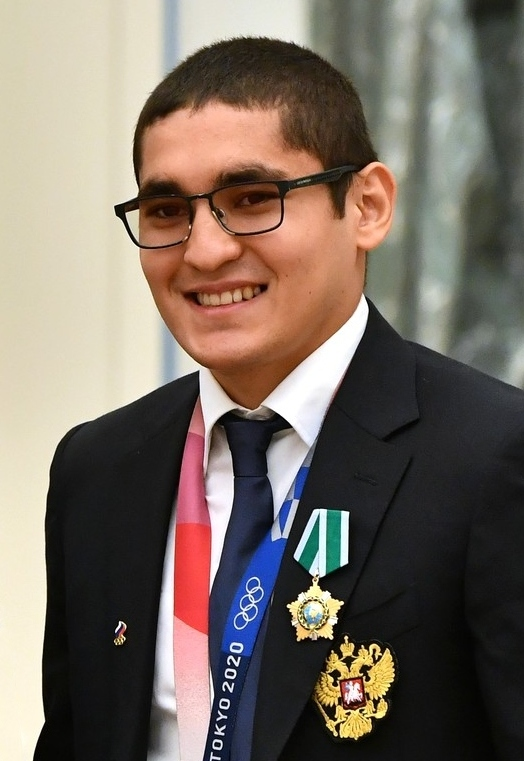
- Batyrgaziev in 2021

Personal information
- Nickname: AL BA
- Born: 23 June 1998 (age 28) Babayurt, Dagestan, Russia
- Height: 5 ft 5 1/2 in (166 cm)
- Weight: Featherweight; Super featherweight

Boxing career
- Stance: Southpaw

Boxing record
- Total fights: 13
- Wins: 12
- Win by KO: 8
- Losses: 1
Medal record
Men's Amateur boxing
Representing ROC
Olympic Games
Gold medal – first place	2020 Tokyo	Featherweight

Albert Khanbulatovich Batyrgaziev (Russian: Альберт Ханбулатович Батыргазиев, IPA: [ɐlʲˈbʲerd bətɨrɡɐˈzʲi(ɪ̯)ɪf]; born 23 June 1998) is a Russian professional boxer who won a gold medal in the featherweight division at the 2020 Summer Olympics in Tokyo. He is of Nogai origin.

== Olympic career ==
Batyrgaziev was a champion kickboxer as a teenager before he took up boxing in earnest in 2016. As an amateur, Batyrgaziev represented Russia at the 2019 World Championships. After making his professional debut in 2020, Batyrgaziev secured a place at the 2020 Summer Olympics in 2021 by winning a gold medal at the 2020 European Qualification Tournament.

Batyrgaziev won his first two fights in Tokyo to reach the semifinals, where he came from behind to beat Cuban three-time Olympic medalist Lázaro Álvarez 3–2 in a close bout. In the featherweight final, Batyrgaziev beat Duke Ragan of the United States 3–2 to become the first professional boxer in Olympic history to win a gold medal.

== Professional career ==
=== Featherweight ===
Batyrgaziev made his professional debut on 3 July 2020, scoring a seventh-round stoppage victory via corner retirement (RTD) against Armen Ataev to capture the vacant WBA Asia East super-featherweight title at the Soviet Wings Sport Palace in Moscow, Russia.

His second fight came against Erzhan Turgumbekov on 22 August 2020 in Kazan, Russia. In a fight which saw Turgumbekov receive a point deduction in the sixth round for hitting below the belt, Batyrgaziev went on to win via technical knockout (TKO) at 1 minute and 38 seconds in the tenth and final round.

He next faced Sibusiso Zingange on 29 January 2021 at the Soviet Wings Sport Palace in Moscow. Batyrgaziev knocked his opponent down in the seventh round with a punch to the body. Zingange made it back to his feet before the referee's count of ten, only to be knocked to the floor for a second time as his corner threw in the towel, handing Batyrgaziev a seventh-round TKO victory.

Batyrgaziev was scheduled to face Suat Laze for the vacant WBO European featherweight title on 11 October 2021, at the Ice Palace Salavat Yulaev in Ufa, Russia. The bout was set as the co-main event of a card dedicated to the Bashkortostan National Day, and was broadcast by Match TV. Batyrgaziev won the fight by a second-round knockout.

Batyrgaziev was booked face Franklin Manzanilla for the vacant IBF International featherweight title on 24 December 2021, at the USC Soviet Wings in Moscow, Russia. The bout was scheduled as the co-main event of a 14-fight Match TV broadcast fight card. He won the fight by a fourth-round technical knockout, as Manzanilla's corner threw in the towel at the 2:25 minute mark.

=== Super featherweight ===
Batyrgaziev faced Heybatulla Hajialiyev for the vacant EBP lightweight title on 3 April 2022, at the USC Soviet Wings in Moscow, Russia. He won the fight by unanimous decision, with scores of 99–91, 100–90 and 100–90. Batyrgaziev next faced Ricardo Nunez in a lightweight bout on 11 November 2022. He won the fight by unanimous decision.

Batyrgaziev faced the former WBA super featherweight champion Jezzrel Corrales on 4 February 2023. He won the fight by a ninth-round technical knockout, as Corrales' corner threw in the towel 28 seconds into the penultimate round. Batyrgaziev next faced the undefeated Francis Frometa on 28 July 2023. He won the fight by unanimous decision.

Bartyrgaziev won the vacant WBA interim super-featherweight title by stopping Jono Carroll in the ninth round at the IBA Colosseum in Serpukhov, Russia, on 12 July 2024.

He defended the title and added the IBA super-featherweight belt with a unanimous decision win over Neri Ariel Cruz Romero at Dynamo Volleyball Arena in Moscow, Russia, on 7 March 2025.

Bartyrgaziev lost his titles, and undefeated professional record, to Jazza Dickens at Rixos Tersane in Istanbul, Turkey, on 2 July 2025, via stoppage in the fourth round.

== Professional boxing record ==
13 fights	12 wins	1 loss
By knockout	8	1
By decision	4	0

No.	Result	Record	Opponent	Type	Round, time	Date	Location	Notes
13	Loss	12–1	Jazza Dickens	KO	4 (12), 2:29	2 Jul 2025	Rixos Tersane, Istanbul, Turkey	Lost IBA and WBA interim super-featherweight titles
12	Win	12–0	Neri Ariel Cruz Romero	UD	12	7 Mar 2025	Dynamo Volleyball Arena, Moscow, Russia	Retained IBA and WBA interim super-featherweight titles
11	Win	11–0	Jono Carroll	TKO	9 (12), 2:23	12 Jul 2024	IBA Colosseum, Serpukhov, Russia	Won vacant WBA interim super-featherweight title
10	Win	10–0	Ender Luces	KO	5 (10), 1:48	10 Oct 2023	Universal Sports Palace Molot, Perm, Russia	
9	Win	9–0	Francis Frometa	UD	10	28 Jul 2023	Tennis Centre, Khanty-Mansiysk, Russia	
8	Win	8–0	Jezreel Corrales	RTD	9 (10), 0:28	4 Feb 2023	Sport Palace "Nadezhda", Serpukhov, Russia	
7	Win	7–0	Ricardo Nunez	UD	10	11 Nov 2022	USC Soviet Wings, Moscow, Russia	
6	Win	6–0	Heybatulla Hajialiyev	UD	10	3 Apr 2022	USC Soviet Wings, Moscow, Russia	Won vacant EBP lightweight title
5	Win	5–0	Franklin Manzanilla	TKO	4 (10), 2:25	24 Dec 2021	USC Soviet Wings, Moscow, Russia	Won vacant IBF International and EBP featherweight titles
4	Win	4–0	Suat Laze	KO	2 (10), 1:57	11 Oct 2021	Ice Palace Salavat Yulaev, Ufa, Russia	Won vacant WBO European featherweight title
3	Win	3–0	Sibusiso Zingange	TKO	7 (10), 2:07	29 Jan 2021	Soviet Wings Sport Palace, Moscow, Russia	
2	Win	2–0	Erzhan Turgumbekov	TKO	10 (10), 1:38	22 Aug 2020	Pyramids, Kazan, Russia	
1	Win	1–0	Armen Ataev	RTD	7 (10), 3:00	3 Jul 2020	Soviet Wings Sport Palace, Moscow, Russia	

== IBA professional boxing record ==
1 fight	1 win	0 losses
By knockout	1	0

No.	Result	Record	Opponent	Type	Round, time	Date	Location	Notes
1	Win	1–0	Albert Pagara	TKO	4 (10), 3:00	17 Oct 2024	Ufa Arena, Ufa, Russia	Won vacant IBA lightweight title; Pagara unable to continue due to an injury on his left arm

== See also ==
- List of southpaw stance boxers

Sporting positions
Regional boxing titles
Vacant Title last held by Jazza Dickens	WBO European featherweight champion 11 October 2021 – 12 July 2024; Won interim title	Vacant
Vacant Title last held by Shakur Stevenson	IBF Inter-Continental featherweight champion 24 December 2021 – 2022; Vacated	Vacant Title next held by Edward Vazquez
New title	EBP featherweight champion 24 December 2021 – 2022; Vacated	Vacant Title next held by Vladimir Nikitin
Vacant Title last held by Gabil Mamedov	EBP lightweight champion 2 April 2022 – 2022; Vacated	Vacant Title next held by Soslan Baev
World boxing titles
Vacant Title last held by Chris Colbert	WBA super-featherweight champion Interim title 12 July 2024 – 2 July 2025	Succeeded by Jazza Dickens
