= 2023 IBA Men's World Boxing Championships =

Sport tournament

2023 IBA Men's World Amateur Boxing Championships
- Venue: Humo Arena
- Location: Tashkent, Uzbekistan
- Dates: 30 April – 14 May
- Total prize money: 5.2 million $

The 2023 IBA Men's World Boxing Championships were held in Tashkent, Uzbekistan, from 30 April to 14 May 2023. Athletes from all five continents took part in the championship and competed for medals in 13 weight categories, which were approved by the Board of Directors of the International Boxing Association (IBA) in July 2021.

== Prize money ==
Gold medallists received $200,000, with silver medallists receiving the previous champion's purse of $100,000 and bronze medallists taking home $50,000. Prize money was introduced for the 2021 Men's World Championships and 2022 Women's World Championships as an incentive for boxers to be rewarded at the highest level of the amateur sport.

== Qualification System for Paris 2024 ==
In June 2022, the International Olympic Committee (IOC) stripped IBA's rights to run and organize the tournament due to "continuing irregularity issues in the areas of finance, governance, ethics, refereeing, and judging". Hence, the IOC executive board established and ratified a new qualification system for Paris 2024 that would witness the boxers obtain the quota spots through the continental multisport events, reducing the complexity of the process. The qualification period commences at five regional multisport events in the middle of the 2023 season (2023 African Games in Accra, Ghana; 2022 Asian Games in Hangzhou, China; 2023 European Games in Poland; 2023 Pacific Games in Honiara, Solomon Islands; and the 2023 Pan American Games in Santiago, Chile), set to be served as continental qualifying meets, where a total of 139 spots will be assigned to a specific number of highest-ranked boxers in each weight category. For these reasons, this tournament does not give a quota for the Olympic Games.

== Schedule ==
All times are local (UTC+5).

Date	Mon 1	Tue 2		Wed 3		Thu 4		Fri 5		Sat 6		Sun 7		Mon 8		Tue 9		Wed 10		Thu 11	Fri 12		Sat 13	Sun 14
Event	17:00	13:00	18:00	14:00	18:00	13:00	18:00	13:00	18:00	14:00	18:00	14:00	18:00	14:00	18:00	14:00	18:00	14:00	18:00		14:00	18:00	17:00	17:00
Minimumweight						R32									R16				QF			SF		F
Flyweight						R64						R32				R16		QF			SF		F	
Bantamweight					R64									R32			R16		QF			SF		F
Featherweight	R64							R32				R16						QF			SF		F	
Lightweight	R64			R32											R16				QF			SF		F
Light welterweight		R64				R32				R16								QF			SF		F	
Welterweight					R64					R32							R16		QF			SF		F
Light middleweight				R64						R32						R16		QF			SF		F	
Middleweight			R64									R32					R16		QF			SF		F
Light heavyweight		R64						R32								R16		QF			SF		F	
Cruiserweight		R32													R16				QF			SF		F
Heavyweight	R64							R32						R16				QF			SF		F	
Super heavyweight	R64					R32							R16						QF			SF		F

== Medal summary ==
=== Medal table ===
* Host nation (Uzbekistan)

Rank	Nation	Gold	Silver	Bronze	Total
1	Uzbekistan*	5	2	2	9
2	Kazakhstan	4	1	0	5
3	Russia	2	0	4	6
4	Cuba	1	3	2	6
5	France	1	1	1	3
6	Georgia	0	1	2	3
7	Azerbaijan	0	1	1	2
7	Brazil	0	1	1	2
7	Mongolia	0	1	1	2
10	China	0	1	0	1
10	Italy	0	1	0	1
12	India	0	0	3	3
12	Spain	0	0	3	3
14	Armenia	0	0	2	2
15	Jordan	0	0	1	1
15	Kyrgyzstan	0	0	1	1
15	Mexico	0	0	1	1
15	Tajikistan	0	0	1	1
Totals (18 entries)		13	13	26	52

=== Medalists ===
Event	Gold	Silver	Bronze
Minimumweight	Sanzhar Tashkenbay; Kazakhstan	Sakhil Alakhverdovi; Georgia	Alejandro Claro; Cuba
Minimumweight	Sanzhar Tashkenbay; Kazakhstan	Sakhil Alakhverdovi; Georgia	Edmond Khudoyan; Russia
Flyweight	Hasanboy Dusmatov; Uzbekistan	Billal Bennama; France	Deepak Bhoria; India
Flyweight	Hasanboy Dusmatov; Uzbekistan	Billal Bennama; France	Martín Molina; Spain
Bantamweight	Makhmud Sabyrkhan; Kazakhstan	Oybek Juraev; Uzbekistan	Yosvany Veitía; Cuba
Bantamweight	Makhmud Sabyrkhan; Kazakhstan	Oybek Juraev; Uzbekistan	Dmitry Dvali; Russia
Featherweight	Abdumalik Khalokov; Uzbekistan	Saidel Horta; Cuba	Mohammad Hussamuddin; India
Featherweight	Abdumalik Khalokov; Uzbekistan	Saidel Horta; Cuba	Munarbek Seitbek Uulu; Kyrgyzstan
Lightweight	Sofiane Oumiha; France	Erislandy Álvarez; Cuba	Mohammad Abu Jajeh; Jordan
Lightweight	Sofiane Oumiha; France	Erislandy Álvarez; Cuba	Vsevolod Shumkov; Russia
Light welterweight	Ruslan Abdullaev; Uzbekistan	Baatarsükhiin Chinzorig; Mongolia	Hovhannes Bachkov; Armenia
Light welterweight	Ruslan Abdullaev; Uzbekistan	Baatarsükhiin Chinzorig; Mongolia	Bakhodur Usmonov; Tajikistan
Welterweight	Asadkhuja Muydinkhujaev; Uzbekistan	Dulat Bekbauov; Kazakhstan	Lasha Guruli; Georgia
Welterweight	Asadkhuja Muydinkhujaev; Uzbekistan	Dulat Bekbauov; Kazakhstan	Battömöriin Misheelt; Mongolia
Light middleweight	Aslanbek Shymbergenov; Kazakhstan	Saidjamshid Jafarov; Uzbekistan	Nishant Dev; India
Light middleweight	Aslanbek Shymbergenov; Kazakhstan	Saidjamshid Jafarov; Uzbekistan	Wanderson de Oliveira; Brazil
Middleweight	Yoenlis Hernández; Cuba	Wanderley Pereira; Brazil	Alokhon Abdullaev; Uzbekistan
Middleweight	Yoenlis Hernández; Cuba	Wanderley Pereira; Brazil	Moreno Fendero; France
Light heavyweight	Nurbek Oralbay; Kazakhstan	Tuohetaerbieke Tanglatihan; China	Gazimagomed Jalidov; Spain
Light heavyweight	Nurbek Oralbay; Kazakhstan	Tuohetaerbieke Tanglatihan; China	Imam Khataev; Russia
Cruiserweight	Sharabutdin Ataev; Russia	Loren Alfonso; Azerbaijan	Georgii Kushitashvili; Georgia
Cruiserweight	Sharabutdin Ataev; Russia	Loren Alfonso; Azerbaijan	Rogelio Romero; Mexico
Heavyweight	Muslim Gadzhimagomedov; Russia	Aziz Abbes Mouhiidine; Italy	Lazizbek Mullojonov; Uzbekistan
Heavyweight	Muslim Gadzhimagomedov; Russia	Aziz Abbes Mouhiidine; Italy	Narek Manasyan; Armenia
Super heavyweight	Bakhodir Jalolov; Uzbekistan	Fernando Arzola; Cuba	Mahammad Abdullayev; Azerbaijan
Super heavyweight	Bakhodir Jalolov; Uzbekistan	Fernando Arzola; Cuba	Ayoub Ghadfa; Spain

== Participating nations ==
538 athletes from 107 countries participated in the championships.

1. Afghanistan (2)
2. Albania (6)
3. Algeria (7)
4. Angola (2)
5. Antigua and Barbuda (1)
6. Armenia (11)
7. Australia (9)
8. Austria (4)
9. Azerbaijan (13)
10. Bahamas (1)
11. Bahrain (2)
12. Barbados (1)
13. Belarus (8)
14. Bosnia and Herzegovina (2)
15. Botswana (4)
16. Brazil (7)
17. Bulgaria (10)
18. Burundi (3)
19. Cameroon (4)
20. Cape Verde (1)
21. China (10)
22. Chinese Taipei (8)
23. Colombia (5)
24. Comoros (3)
25. Cook Islands (1)
26. Croatia (3)
27. Cuba (13)
28. Cyprus (1)
29. Democratic Republic of the Congo (7)
30. Dominican Republic (9)
31. Ecuador (6)
32. Egypt (2)
33. El Salvador (3)
34. Eswatini (4)
35. Ethiopia (3)
36. Fiji (2)
37. France (11)
38. French Polynesia (1)
39. Gambia (3)
40. Georgia (10)
41. Germany (2) (Note: Six boxers from four boycotting national federations (Germany, Poland, Scotland and Sweden) competed at the World Championships through the Financial Support Programme (FSP) aided by the International Boxing Association (IBA).)
42. Ghana (6)
43. Greece (3)
44. Guatemala (3)
45. Guinea (2)
46. Guyana (2)
47. Haiti (2)
48. Hong Kong (3)
49. Hungary (7)
50. India (13)
51. Indonesia (4)
52. Iran (7)
53. Israel (5)
54. Italy (6)
55. Jamaica (2)
56. Japan (9)
57. Jordan (11)
58. Kazakhstan (13)
59. Kenya (8)
60. Kyrgyzstan (13)
61. Lesotho (3)
62. Luxembourg (1)
63. Mali (1)
64. Mauritius (2)
65. Mexico (9)
66. Moldova (10)
67. Mongolia (10)
68. Montenegro (1)
69. Morocco (7)
70. Mozambique (4)
71. Nepal (2)
72. Niger (1)
73. Nigeria (3)
74. North Macedonia (2)
75. Pakistan (1)
76. Palestine (3)
77. Panama (2)
78. Paraguay (3)
79. Poland (1)
80. Puerto Rico (3)
81. Romania (3)
82. Russia (13)
83. Saint Lucia (1)
84. Scotland (1)
85. Senegal (4)
86. Serbia (9)
87. Sierra Leone (2)
88. Slovenia (2)
89. South Africa (4)
90. South Korea (11)
91. Spain (11)
92. Sri Lanka (1)
93. Sweden (2)
94. Syria (3)
95. Tajikistan (12)
96. Tanzania (4)
97. Thailand (6)
98. Tonga (1)
99. Trinidad and Tobago (7)
100. Turkey (11)
101. Turkmenistan (10)
102. Uganda (1)
103. United Arab Emirates (3)
104. Uzbekistan (13)
105. Venezuela (3)
106. Zambia (3)
107. Zimbabwe (4)

== Controversies ==
=== Boycott due to participation of athletes from Russia and Belarus ===
countries that boycotted the tournament are shaded blue

Ignoring Russia's full-scale invasion of Ukraine in February 2022 and subsequent recommendations of the International Olympic Committee to bar Russian and Belarusian athletes from competing under their national flags and for the anthems to be played, the International Boxing Association under the leadership of Russian Umar Kremlev allowed them to compete with no restrictions. In the aftermath, 19 countries (21 national federations) decided to boycott the championship over IBA's decision.

The nations that boycotted the tournament were:

- Argentina
- Canada
- Czech Republic
- Denmark
- Finland
- Germany
- Great Britain
  - England
  - Scotland
  - Wales
- Iceland
- Ireland
- Latvia
- Lithuania
- Netherlands
- New Zealand
- Norway
- Poland
- Sweden
- Switzerland
- Ukraine
- United States

=== Kosovo's non-participation ===
Kosovo did not attend in protest at the Uzbekistani authorities' request to issue a visa to enter the country and to ban the use of the flag and national anthem.

=== Host country attitude ===
"Uzbekistan is a country that adheres to international sports norms and supports the principle of sports being free from politics."

Shohid Tillaboev Secretary General of Uzbekistan Boxing Federation.
