= Kurt Walker (boxer) =

Irish boxer (born 1995)

Personal information
- Nationality: Irish
- Born: Kurt Anthony Walker; 7 March 1995 (age 31) Lisburn, Northern Ireland
- Height: 5 ft 6 in (168 cm)
- Weight: Bantamweight, Featherweight

Boxing career
- Stance: Orthodox

Boxing record
- Total fights: 13
- Wins: 12
- Win by KO: 2
- Losses: 1
Medal record
Men's amateur boxing
Representing Ireland
European Games
Gold medal – first place	2019 Minsk	Bantamweight
European Championships
Bronze medal – third place	2017 Kharkiv	Bantamweight
EU Championships
Gold medal – first place	2018 Valladolid	Bantamweight
AIBA Youth World Boxing Championships
Bronze medal – third place	2012 Yerevan	Flyweight
European Youth Boxing Championships
Silver medal – second place	2013 Rotterdam	Bantamweight
Representing Northern Ireland
Commonwealth Games
Silver medal – second place	2018 Gold Coast	Bantamweight

Kurt Anthony James Walker (born 7 March 1995) is an Irish professional boxer. As an amateur, he won gold medals at the 2018 EU Championships and 2019 European Games, silver at the 2018 Commonwealth Games and bronze at the 2017 European Championships. Having turned professional in November 2021, Walker was undefeated in his first 12 paid fights, before losing to Liam Davies by unanimous decision in a bout for the vacant IBF Inter-Continental featherweight title at Nottingham Arena on 10 May 2025.

== Professional boxing record ==
14 fights	13 wins	1 loss
By knockout	2	0
By decision	11	1

No.	Result	Record	Opponent	Type	Round, time	Date	Location	Notes
14	Win	13–1	Yahir Morales	PTS	4	20 Marh 2026	SSE Arena, Belfast, Northern Ireland	
13	Loss	12–1	Liam Davies	UD	12	10 May 2025	Nottingham Arena, Nottingham, England	For vacant IBF Inter-Continental featherweight title
12	Win	12–0	Lyon Woodstock	MD	10	1 Mar 2025	SSE Arena, Belfast, Northern Ireland	
11	Win	11–0	James Beech Jr.	RTD	7 (10), 3:00	30 Mar 2024	Ulster Hall, Belfast, Northern Ireland	
10	Win	10–0	Darwing Martinez	PTS	6	28 Jan 2024	Ulster Hall, Belfast, Northern Ireland	
9	Win	9–0	Angelo Turco	PTS	8	23 Nov 2023	Radisson Blu Hotel, Glasgow, Scotland	
8	Win	8–0	Jayro Fernando Duran	PTS	8	4 Aug 2023	Falls Park, Belfast, Northern Ireland	
7	Win	7–0	Maicol Velazco	PTS	6	27 May 2023	SSE Arena, Belfast, Northern Ireland	
6	Win	6–0	Jonatas Rodrigo Gomes de Oliveira	PTS	8	21 Apr 2023	Salthill Leisureland Complex, Galway, Ireland	
5	Win	5–0	Yader Cardoza	PTS	6	10 Dec 2022	SSE Arena, Belfast, Northern Ireland	
4	Win	4–0	Yin Caicedo	UD	6	22 Oct 2022	Fabriksporthalle, Frankfurt, Germany	
3	Win	3–0	Marcos Gabriel Martinez	PTS	6	6 Aug 2022	SSE Arena, Belfast, Northern Ireland	
2	Win	2–0	Stefan Nicolae	PTS	4	23 Apr 2022	Wembley Stadium, London, England	
1	Win	1–0	Jaroslav Hriadel	TKO	1 (4), 2:03	26 Feb 2022	OVO Hydro, Glasgow, Scotland	
