= Munarbek Seitbek Uulu =

Kyrgyzstani boxer (born 1996)

Munarbek Seiitbek Uulu
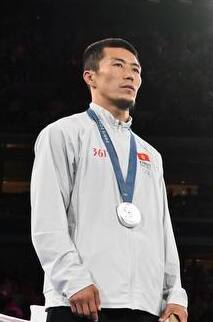
- Seiitbek Uulu at the 2024 Paris Olympics

Personal information
- Born: 1 January 1996 (age 30) Osh, Kyrgyzstan

Sport
- Sport: Boxing
Medal record
Men's boxing
Representing Kyrgyzstan
Olympic Games
Silver medal – second place	2024 Paris	Featherweight
IBA World Championships
Bronze medal – third place	2023 Tashkent	Featherweight
World Cup
Silver medal – second place	2025 New Delhi	Featherweight

Munarbek Seiitbek Uulu (Kyrgyz: Мунарбек Сейитбек уулу; born 1 January 1996) is a Kyrgyzstani boxer. He competed in the 2024 Paris Olympics in the men's 57 kg weight division and reached the semifinals after defeating Luiz Gabriel Oliveira and Jahmal Harvey.

== Professional boxing record ==
1 fight	1 win	0 losses
By decision	1	0

No.	Result	Record	Opponent	Type	Round, time	Date	Location	Notes
1	Win	1–0	Connrad Sseruyange	UD	6	20 Jul 2025	Bishkek Arena, Bishkek, Kyrgyzstan	
