= Javier Ibáñez =

Cuban-born Bulgarian boxer

Javier Ibáñez Diaz
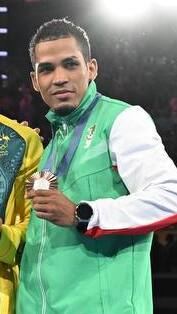
- Ibáñez at the 2024 Summer Olympics

Personal information
- Nationality: Bulgaria
- Born: 14 July 1996 (age 29) Matanzas, Cuba
- Height: 1.70 m (5 ft 7 in)

Boxing career

Boxing record
- Wins: 85
- Win by KO: 3
- Losses: 17
Medal record
Men's amateur boxing
Representing Bulgaria
Olympic Games
Bronze medal – third place	2024 Paris	Featherweight
European Games
Gold medal – first place	2023 Kraków-Małopolska	Featherweight
European Championships
Silver medal – second place	2024 Belgrade	Featherweight
Bronze medal – third place	2022 Yerevan	Featherweight
Representing Cuba
Youth Olympic Games
Gold medal – first place	2014 Nanjing	−56 kg
Youth World Championships
Gold medal – first place	2014 Sofia	−56 kg
Event	1st	2nd	3rd
Summer Olympics	0	0	1
European Games	1	0	0
European Championships	0	1	1
Youth Olympic Games	1	0	0
Youth Championships	1	0	0
Total	3	1	2

Javier Ibáñez Diaz (born 14 July 1996) is a Cuban-born Bulgarian boxer. He competed at the 2024 Summer Olympics, winning the bronze medal in the men's featherweight event. He competed as a bantamweight as a youth, and currently competes as a featherweight.

== Biography ==
Ibáñez was born in Matanzas, Cuba, and speaks Spanish fluently. In 2018, he switched his nationality from Cuban to Bulgarian. He currently lives in Sofia, Bulgaria, with his Bulgarian wife.
