= Samuel Kistohurry =

French boxer (born 1995)

Personal information
- Nationality: French
- Born: 1 February 1995 (age 31) Pessac, France
- Height: 1.75 m (5 ft 9 in)
- Weight: 56 kg (123 lb)

Boxing career

Boxing record
- Total fights: 3
- Wins: 3
Medal record
Men's amateur boxing
Representing France
World Championships
Bronze medal – third place	2021 Belgrade	Featherweight
European Championships
Bronze medal – third place	2024 Belgrade	Featherweight

Samuel Kistohurry (born 1 March 1995) is a French boxer. He competed in the featherweight division at the 2020 Summer Olympics. He also competed at the 2021 World Championships, where he won a medal.
