= Vsevolod Shumkov =

Russian boxer

Personal information
- Nationality: Russia
- Born: 27 October 2001 (age 24) Kamensk-Uralsky, Russia

Boxing career
Medal record
Men's amateur boxing
Representing Russia
IBA World Championships
Gold medal – first place	2025 Dubai	Lightweight
Bronze medal – third place	2023 Tashkent	Lightweight
European Championships
Gold medal – first place	2024 Belgrade	Lightweight

Vsevolod Vladimirovich Shumkov (Russian: Всеволод Владимирович Шумков; born 27 October 2001) (Note: Shumkov was 21 years old in 2023) is a Russian boxer. He competed at the 2023 IBA Men's World Boxing Championships, winning the bronze medal in the lightweight event. He also competed at the 2024 European Amateur Boxing Championships, winning the gold medal in the same event.
