= Eduard Savvin =

Russian boxer

Personal information
- Nationality: Russia

Boxing career
Medal record
Men's amateur boxing
Representing Russia
European Championships
Gold medal – first place	2024 Belgrade	Featherweight

Eduard Savvin is a Russian boxer. He competed at the 2024 European Amateur Boxing Championships, winning the gold medal in the featherweight event.
