= Serik Temirzhanov =

Kazakh boxer (born 1998)

Personal information
- Born: 24 May 1998 (age 28) Pavlodar, Kazakhstan

Sport
- Country: Kazakhstan
- Sport: Boxing
Medal record
Men's amateur boxing
Representing Kazakhstan
World Championships
| Silver medal – second place | 2021 Belgrade | Featherweight |
Asian Championships
| Silver medal – second place | 2022 Amman | Featherweight |

Serik Temirzhanov (Серік Теміржанов, born 24 May 1998) is a Kazakh boxer. He competed in the men's featherweight event at the 2020 Summer Olympics held in Tokyo, Japan. He lost to Duke Ragan of America in the Second round. He also competed at the 2021 World Championships, where he won a medal.
