= Jahmal Harvey =

American boxer (born 2002)

Personal information
- Nickname: Hard Rock
- Born: November 19, 2002 (age 23) Oxon Hill, Maryland, U.S.
- Height: 5 ft 7 1/2 in (171 cm)

Boxing career
- Weight class: Featherweight
- Stance: Orthodox

Boxing record
- Total fights: 2
- Wins: 2
- Win by KO: 1
- No contests: 0
Medal record
Men's professional boxing
Representing United States
World Championships
Gold medal – first place	2021 Belgrade	Featherweight
Pan American Games
Gold medal – first place	2023 Santiago	57 kg

Jahmal Harvey (/dʒəˈmɑːl/ jə-MAHL; born November 19, 2002) is an American boxer who won a gold medal at the 2021 World Championships in the Featherweight division.

== Professional career ==
In August, 2025, it was announced that Harvey has signed with Most Valuable Promotions.

Harvey made his professional debut on August 22, 2025 against Marcelo Del Aguila. Harvey won the fight via a first-round Corner Retirement.

Harvey was scheduled to face Kevin Cervantes in a six-round super featherweight bout in Miami, FL, on November 11, 2025 on the undercard of Jake Paul vs. Gervonta Davis. After the Paul vs. Davis event was canceled, the fight was rescheduled for December 19, 2025, on the Jake Paul vs. Anthony Joshua undercard. Harvey defeated Cervantes via unanimous decision.

== Professional boxing record ==
5 fights	5 wins	0 losses
By knockout	4	0
By decision	1	0

No.	Result	Record	Opponent	Type	Round, time	Date	Location	Notes
5	Win	5–0	Pedro Castaneda Castro	TKO	3 (8), 1:08	Oct 10, 2026	Wintrust Arena, Chicago, Illinois, U.S.	
4	Win	4–0	Hammet Keb	KO	2 (6), 2:48	Aug 21, 2026	Pechanga Resort Casino, Temecula, California, U.S.	
3	Win	3–0	Daniel Vicente Lugo Valdez	TKO	5 (6), 1:32	Apr 17, 2026	The Theater at Madison Square Garden, New York City, New York, U.S.	
2	Win	2–0	Kevin Cervantes	UD	6	Dec 19, 2025	Kaseya Center, Miami, Florida. U.S.	
1	Win	1–0	Marcelo Del Aguila	RTD	1 (6), 3:00	Aug 22, 2025	Caribe Royale Orlando, Orlando, Florida, U.S.	
