= Tayfur Aliyev =

Azerbaijani boxer (born 1997)

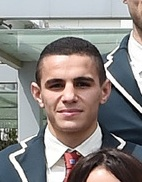
- Aliyev in 2017

Personal information
- Nationality: Azerbaijani
- Born: 1 January 1997 (age 29) Nakhchivan, Azerbaijan

Boxing career
Medal record
Men's amateur boxing
Representing Azerbaijan
World Military Boxing Championships
Bronze medal – third place	2021 Moscow	Lightweight

Tayfur Aliyev (Azerbaijani: Tayfur Nəriman oğlu Əliyev, born 1 January 1997) is an Azerbaijani boxer. He competed in the men's featherweight event at the 2020 Summer Olympics, where he placed 17th.
