= Jean Caicedo =

Ecuadorian boxer (born 1995)

Personal information
- Full name: Jean Carlos Caicedo Pachito
- Born: 10 January 1995 (age 31) Montecristi, Ecuador

Sport
- Sport: Boxing

Jean Carlos Caicedo Pachito (born 10 January 1995) is an Ecuadorian boxer. He competed in the men's featherweight event at the 2020 Summer Olympics.
