= 2021 AIBA World Boxing Championships =

Boxing competitions

- Venue: Štark Arena
- Location: Belgrade, Serbia
- Dates: 25 October – 6 November
- Competitors: 510
- Teams: 88

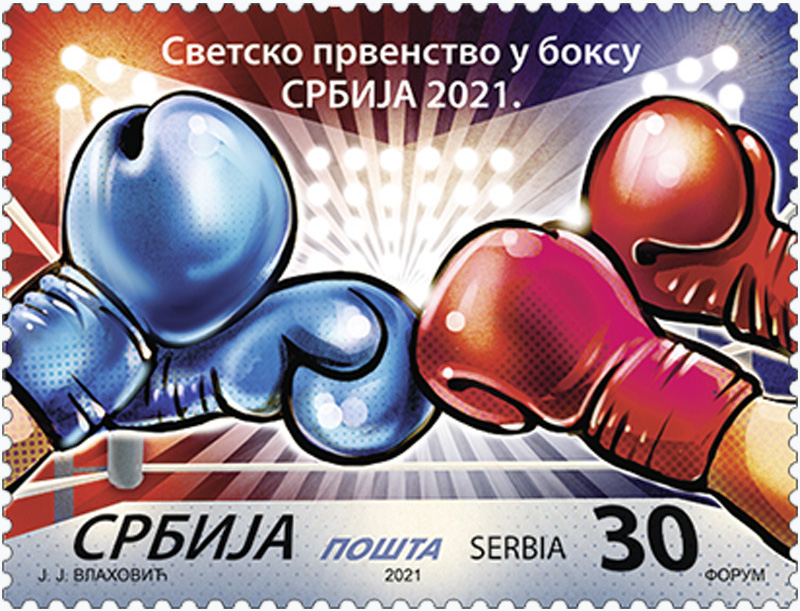
A stamp of Serbia dedicated to the 2021 World Amateur Boxing Championships

The 2021 AIBA World Boxing Championships were held in Belgrade, Serbia from 25 October to 6 November. Belgrade was picked to host the championships for the second time; the original 2021 contract with New Delhi was cancelled due to a disagreement between AIBA and the Boxing Federation of India over hosting fees. AIBA also demanded the BFI pay a cancellation penalty of US$500,000.

For the first time in AIBA’s 75-year history, medal winners were awarded prize money; gold medallists earn $100,000, silver medallists $50,000, and bronze medallists $25,000. The overall prize fund was worth $2.6 million.

== Medal summary ==
=== Medal table ===
* Host nation (Serbia)

Rank	Nation	Gold	Silver	Bronze	Total
1	Cuba	3	0	2	5
2	Kazakhstan	2	2	1	5
3	United States	2	2	0	4
4	Japan	2	0	0	2
5	(Russia) Russian Boxing Federation (Note: In accordance with a ban by WADA and a decision by CAS, Russian boxers were not permitted to use the Russian name, flag, or anthem. They instead participated as the Russian Boxing Federation and under the Russian Olympic Committee flag.)	1	2	2	5
6	Azerbaijan	1	0	2	3
6	France	1	0	2	3
8	Ukraine	1	0	0	1
9	Thailand Boxing Federation (Note: In accordance with a ban by WADA, Thai boxers participated as the Thailand Boxing Federation, under the AIBA flag.)	0	1	2	3
10	Armenia	0	1	1	2
10	Belarus	0	1	1	2
10	Italy	0	1	1	2
10	Uzbekistan	0	1	1	2
14	Brazil	0	1	0	1
14	Turkey	0	1	0	1
16	Georgia	0	0	2	2
17	Albania	0	0	1	1
17	Belgium	0	0	1	1
17	Dominican Republic	0	0	1	1
17	India	0	0	1	1
17	Iran	0	0	1	1
17	Scotland	0	0	1	1
17	Serbia*	0	0	1	1
17	Spain	0	0	1	1
17	Trinidad and Tobago	0	0	1	1
Totals (25 entries)		13	13	26	52

=== Medalists ===
Event	Gold	Silver	Bronze
Minimumweight	Temirtas Zhussupov; Kazakhstan	Wuttichai Yurachai; Thailand Boxing Federation	Yauheni Karmilchyk; Belarus
Minimumweight	Temirtas Zhussupov; Kazakhstan	Wuttichai Yurachai; Thailand Boxing Federation	Sakhil Alakhverdovi; Georgia
Flyweight	Saken Bibossinov; Kazakhstan	Roscoe Hill; United States	Thanarat Saengphet; Thailand Boxing Federation
Flyweight	Saken Bibossinov; Kazakhstan	Roscoe Hill; United States	Akhtem Zakirov (Russia) Russian Boxing Federation
Bantamweight	Tomoya Tsuboi; Japan	Makhmud Sabyrkhan; Kazakhstan	Billal Bennama; France
Bantamweight	Tomoya Tsuboi; Japan	Makhmud Sabyrkhan; Kazakhstan	Akash Kumar; India
Featherweight	Jahmal Harvey; United States	Serik Temirzhanov; Kazakhstan	Samuel Kistohurry; France
Featherweight	Jahmal Harvey; United States	Serik Temirzhanov; Kazakhstan	Osvel Caballero; Cuba
Lightweight	Sofiane Oumiha; France	Abdumalik Khalokov; Uzbekistan	Alexy de la Cruz; Dominican Republic
Lightweight	Sofiane Oumiha; France	Abdumalik Khalokov; Uzbekistan	Danial Shahbakhsh; Iran
Light welterweight	Andy Cruz; Cuba	Kerem Özmen; Turkey	Hovhannes Bachkov; Armenia
Light welterweight	Andy Cruz; Cuba	Kerem Özmen; Turkey	Reese Lynch; Scotland
Welterweight	Sewon Okazawa; Japan	Omari Jones; United States	Ablaikhan Zhussupov; Kazakhstan
Welterweight	Sewon Okazawa; Japan	Omari Jones; United States	Lasha Guruli; Georgia
Light middleweight	Yurii Zakharieiev; Ukraine	Vadim Musaev (Russia) Russian Boxing Federation	Sarkhan Aliyev; Azerbaijan
Light middleweight	Yurii Zakharieiev; Ukraine	Vadim Musaev (Russia) Russian Boxing Federation	Alban Beqiri; Albania
Middleweight	Yoenlis Hernández; Cuba	Dzhambulat Bizhamov (Russia) Russian Boxing Federation	Salvatore Cavallaro; Italy
Middleweight	Yoenlis Hernández; Cuba	Dzhambulat Bizhamov (Russia) Russian Boxing Federation	Weerapon Jongjoho; Thailand Boxing Federation
Light heavyweight	Robby Gonzales; United States	Aliaksei Alfiorau; Belarus	Vladimir Mironchikov; Serbia
Light heavyweight	Robby Gonzales; United States	Aliaksei Alfiorau; Belarus	Savelii Sadoma (Russia) Russian Boxing Federation
Cruiserweight	Loren Alfonso; Azerbaijan	Keno Machado; Brazil	Herich Ruiz; Cuba
Cruiserweight	Loren Alfonso; Azerbaijan	Keno Machado; Brazil	Victor Schelstraete; Belgium
Heavyweight	Julio César La Cruz; Cuba	Aziz Abbes Mouhiidine; Italy	Madiyar Saydrakhimov; Uzbekistan
Heavyweight	Julio César La Cruz; Cuba	Aziz Abbes Mouhiidine; Italy	Enmanuel Reyes; Spain
Super heavyweight	Mark Petrovskii (Russia) Russian Boxing Federation	Davit Chaloyan; Armenia	Nigel Paul; Trinidad and Tobago
Super heavyweight	Mark Petrovskii (Russia) Russian Boxing Federation	Davit Chaloyan; Armenia	Mahammad Abdullayev; Azerbaijan

== Controversies ==
The Kosovo boxing team was prevented from competing at the tournament despite Serbia's hosting contract requiring Serbia to allow all teams to compete. (The contract further requires that all teams be allowed to compete under their own flags and explicitly includes Kosovo; AIBA recognizes the Kosovo Boxing Federation as a full member.) Two days prior to the tournament, the Kosovo boxing team was denied entry into Serbia at border control, effectively shutting them out of the tournament. During negotiations between AIBA and Serbia, Serbia stated to AIBA that Kosovo would not be allowed to compete except under the AIBA flag; this was rejected by Kosovo. One day prior to the tournament, AIBA suggested a compromise to Serbia where Kosovo would compete under "a neutral flag" (similar to Russia's situation); this was rejected by Serbia.

In December 2021 after the tournament, the International Olympic Committee sent a letter to Serbia condemning the incident.

== Participating nations ==
510 athletes from 86 countries and two AIBA Fair Chance Teams participated in the championships:

1. AIBA Fair Chance Team 1 (9)
2. AIBA Fair Chance Team 2 (1)
3. Albania (3)
4. Armenia (11)
5. Austria (1)
6. Azerbaijan (9)
7. Bahamas (2)
8. Barbados (2)
9. Belarus (6)
10. Belgium (3)
11. Bosnia and Herzegovina (3)
12. Brazil (10)
13. Bulgaria (8)
14. Cameroon (3)
15. Chinese Taipei (10)
16. Colombia (8)
17. Croatia (10)
18. Cuba (8)
19. Cyprus (4)
20. Czech Republic (1)
21. Democratic Republic of the Congo (5)
22. Dominican Republic (2)
23. Ecuador (9)
24. England (9)
25. Estonia (2)
26. Finland (3)
27. France (6)
28. Gambia (1)
29. Georgia (7)
30. Germany (13)
31. Greece (4)
32. Guatemala (3)
33. Guyana (2)
34. Haiti (1)
35. Hong Kong (1)
36. Hungary (10)
37. India (13)
38. Iran (10)
39. Iraq (1)
40. Ireland (7)
41. Israel (4)
42. Italy (11)
43. Jamaica (3)
44. Japan (10)
45. Jordan (4)
46. Kazakhstan (13)
47. Kenya (13)
48. Kyrgyzstan (12)
49. Laos (1)
50. Lithuania (8)
51. Luxembourg (1)
52. Mali (1)
53. Mauritius (3)
54. Mexico (9)
55. Moldova (8)
56. Mongolia (8)
57. Montenegro (2)
58. Nepal (4)
59. Nicaragua (1)
60. North Macedonia (2)
61. Norway (3)
62. Pakistan (1)
63. Palestine (1)
64. Panama (3)
65. Poland (8)
66. Puerto Rico (4)
67. Romania (2)
68. (Russia) Russian Boxing Federation (13)
69. Saint Lucia (1)
70. Scotland (6)
71. Serbia (12)
72. Seychelles (3)
73. Sierra Leone (6)
74. Slovakia (5)
75. Slovenia (7)
76. Somalia (2)
77. South Korea (7)
78. Spain (8)
79. Sri Lanka (1)
80. Tajikistan (8)
81. Tanzania (3)
82. Thailand Boxing Federation (10)
83. Trinidad and Tobago (5)
84. Turkey (13)
85. Ukraine (13)
86. United States (9)
87. Uzbekistan (13)
88. Venezuela (4)
