= Vasile Usturoi =

Belgian boxer (born 1997)

Personal information
- Born: 3 April 1997 (age 29) Bucharest, Romania
- Height: 1.71 m (5 ft 7 in)
- Weight: Featherweight

Boxing career
- Stance: Southpaw
Medal record
Men's amateur boxing
Representing Belgium
European Games
Bronze medal – third place	2023 Kraków-Małopolska	Featherweight
European Championships
Gold medal – first place	2022 Yerevan	Featherweight

Vasile Usturoi (born 3 April 1997) is a Romanian-born Belgian amateur boxer who won a gold medal at the 2022 European Championships. For the first time since 1951, Usturoi ensured that a European boxing title came into the hands of a Belgian. Usturoi earned an Olympic quota spot for Belgium for the 2024 Summer Olympics in Paris, France reaching the semi-finals at the 2023 European Games in Kraków, Poland. At the Olympics Usturoi, hampered by having contracted COVID-19 just two weeks earlier, lost his first bout.

== Personal life ==
Born in Romania, Usturoi moved to Belgium when he was 12. He is a football fan and a supporter of team Steaua București. Usturoi means garlic in Romanian language.
