= 2019 AIBA Women's World Boxing Championships – Featherweight =

Featherweight at the 2019 AIBA Women's World Boxing Championships
- Venue: FSK Sports Complex
- Location: Ulan-Ude, Russia
- Dates: 3–13 October
- Competitors: 36 from 36 nations

Medalists
| gold medal | Nesthy Petecio | Philippines |
| silver medal | Liudmila Vorontsova | Russia |
| bronze medal | Karriss Artingstall | England |
| bronze medal | Lin Yu-ting | Chinese Taipei |

The featherweight competition at the 2019 AIBA Women's World Boxing Championships was held from 3 to 13 October 2019.

== Schedule ==
The schedule was as follows:

| Date | Time | Round |
|---|---|---|
| Thursday 3 October 2019 | 20:15 (Ring A); 20:00 (Ring B) | Round of 64 |
| Saturday 5 October 2019 | 18:00 | Round of 32 |
| Tuesday 8 October 2019 | 13:30; 18:30 | Round of 16 |
| Thursday 10 October 2019 | 13:30 | Quarterfinals |
| Saturday 12 October 2019 | 13:30 | Semifinals |
| Sunday 13 October 2019 | After 16:00 | Final |

All times are Irkutsk Time (UTC+8)

== Results ==
=== Finals ===
Semifinals
(Chinese Taipei) Lin Yu-ting | 2
(Russia) Liudmila Vorontsova | 3
(England) Karriss Artingstall | 1
(Philippines) Nesthy Petecio | 4

Final
(Russia) Liudmila Vorontsova | 2
(Philippines) Nesthy Petecio | 3

=== Top half ===
==== Section 1 ====
Round of 64

| | Score | |
|---|---|---|
| Skye Nicolson (Australia) | 5–0 | (Mongolia) Tömörkhuyagiin Bolortuul |

Round of 32
(Chinese Taipei) Lin Yu-ting | 5
(Australia) Skye Nicolson | 0
(Algeria) Hadjila Khelif | 0
(Poland) Kinga Szlachcic | 5
(Honduras) Maria Antunes | 0
(Latvia) Amanda Millere | 5
(Colombia) Yeni Arias | 2
(Thailand) Nilawan Techasuep | 3

Round of 16
(Chinese Taipei) Lin Yu-ting | 5
(Poland) Kinga Szlachcic | 0
(Latvia) Amanda Millere | 0
(Thailand) Nilawan Techasuep | 5

Quarterfinals
(Chinese Taipei) Lin Yu-ting | 5
(Thailand) Nilawan Techasuep | 0

==== Section 2 ====
Round of 64

| | Score | |
|---|---|---|
| Yamileth Solorzano (El Salvador) | 0–5 | (Italy) Alessia Mesiano |

Round of 32
(Republic of Ireland) Michaela Walsh | 5
(Mali) Fatoumata Camara | 0
(Germany) Ramona Graeff | 0
(Russia) Liudmila Vorontsova | 5
(Kazakhstan) Aizhan Khojabekova | 5
(Federated States of Micronesia) Jennifer Chieng | 0
(Italy) Alessia Mesiano | 1
(Netherlands) Jemyma Betrian | 4

Round of 16
(Republic of Ireland) Michaela Walsh | 1
(Russia) Liudmila Vorontsova | 4
(Kazakhstan) Aizhan Khojabekova | 2
(Netherlands) Jemyma Betrian | 3

Quarterfinals
(Russia) Liudmila Vorontsova | 3
(Netherlands) Jemyma Betrian | 2

=== Bottom half ===
==== Section 3 ====
Round of 64

| | Score | |
|---|---|---|
| Yarisel Ramirez (United States) | 0–5 | (England) Karriss Artingstall |

Round of 32
(North Korea) Jo Son-hwa | 0
(England) Karriss Artingstall | 3
(Democratic Republic of the Congo) Marcelat Sakobi
(Tajikistan) Mijgona Samadova | w/o
(Trinidad and Tobago) Tianna Guy | 0
(Canada) Caroline Veyre | 5
(Belarus) Helina Bruyevich | 1
(Uzbekistan) Yodgoroy Mirzaeva | 4

Round of 16
(England) Karriss Artingstall | 5
(Tajikistan) Mijgona Samadova | 0
(Canada) Caroline Veyre | 1
(Uzbekistan) Yodgoroy Mirzaeva | 4

Quarterfinals
(England) Karriss Artingstall | 5
(Uzbekistan) Yodgoroy Mirzaeva | 0

==== Section 4 ====
Round of 64

| | Score | |
|---|---|---|
| Jucielen Romeu (Brazil) | 2–3 | (Philippines) Nesthy Petecio |

Round of 32
(Argentina) Leonela Sánchez | 4
(France) Sofia Nabet | 1
(Turkey) Satı Burcu | 0
(Japan) Sena Irie | 5
(China) Qiao Jieru | 3
(India) Neeraj | 2
(Philippines) Nesthy Petecio | 3
(Bulgaria) Stanimira Petrova | 2

Round of 16
(Argentina) Leonela Sánchez | 1
(Japan) Sena Irie | 4
(China) Qiao Jieru | 2
(Philippines) Nesthy Petecio | 3

Quarterfinals
(Japan) Sena Irie | 1
(Philippines) Nesthy Petecio | 4
