= 2018 AIBA Women's World Boxing Championships – Featherweight =

Boxing competitions

Featherweight at the 2018 AIBA Women's World Boxing Championships
- Dates: 15–24 November
- Competitors: 41 from 41 nations

Medalists
gold medal	Ornella Wahner	Germany
silver medal	Sonia Chahal	India
bronze medal	Jo Son-hwa	North Korea
bronze medal	Jemyma Betrian	Netherlands

The Featherweight (54-57 kg) competition at the 2018 AIBA Women's World Boxing Championships was held from 15 to 24 November 2018.

== Draw ==
=== Preliminaries ===
	Result	
(Bangladesh) Onita Islam	0–5	(Kazakhstan) Nazym Ichshanova
(New Zealand) Amy Andrew	5–0	(Algeria) Hadjila Khelif
(Ukraine) Snizhana Kholodkova	RSC	(Japan) Ayane Watanabe
(Russia) Mariia Sartakova	5–0	(France) Mona Mestiaen
(Somalia) Ramla Ali	2–3	(Morocco) Doaa Toujani
(Romania) Lăcrămioara Perijoc	5–0	(Uzbekistan) Yodgoroy Mirzaeva
(Mongolia) Tömörkhuyagiin Bolortuul	1–4	(Netherlands) Jemyma Betrian
(England) Ellie Scotney	5–0	(Chinese Taipei) Lin Ssu-ting
(Democratic Republic of the Congo) Marcelat Sakobi Matshu	0–5	(Belarus) Helina Bruyevich

=== Main draw ===
Round of 32
17 Nov
(Montenegro) Tamara Radunović	WO
(Kazakhstan) Nazym Ichshanova
17 Nov
(Tajikistan) Mijgona Samadova	0
(North Korea) Jo Son-hwa	5
17 Nov
(Australia) Skye Nicolson	4
(New Zealand) Amy Andrew	1
17 Nov
(Ukraine) Snizhana Kholodkova	1
(Thailand) Nilawan Techasuep	4
17 Nov
(Sweden) Helena Envall	2
(Russia) Mariia Sartakova	3
17 Nov
(Colombia) Yeni Arias	5
(Philippines) Nesthy Petecio	0
17 Nov
(United States) Rianna Rios	5
(Bulgaria) Stanimira Petrova	0
17 Nov
(Morocco) Doaa Toujani	0
(India) Sonia Chahal	5
17 Nov
(Republic of Ireland) Michaela Walsh	4
(Romania) Lăcrămioara Perijoc	1
17 Nov
(Turkey) Esra Yıldız	0
(Italy) Alessia Mesiano	3
17 Nov
(Trinidad and Tobago) Tianna Guy	0
(South Korea) Im Ae-ji	5
17 Nov
(Netherlands) Jemyma Betrian	5
(Puerto Rico) Ashleyann Lozada	0
17 Nov
(Argentina) Leonela Sánchez	5
(England) Ellie Scotney	0
17 Nov
(China) Yin Junhua	3
(Canada) Sabrina Aubin	2
17 Nov
(Poland) Sandra Kruk	0
(Germany) Ornella Wahner	4
17 Nov
(Belarus) Helina Bruyevich	2
(Scotland) Victoria Glover	3

Round of 16
19 Nov
(Montenegro) Tamara Radunović	0
(North Korea) Jo Son-hwa	5
19 Nov
(Australia) Skye Nicolson	3
(Thailand) Nilawan Techasuep	2
19 Nov
(Russia) Mariia Sartakova	0
(Colombia) Yeni Arias	5
19 Nov
(United States) Rianna Rios	2
(India) Sonia Chahal	3
19 Nov
(Republic of Ireland) Michaela Walsh	1
(Italy) Alessia Mesiano	4
19 Nov
(South Korea) Im Ae-ji
(Netherlands) Jemyma Betrian	RSC
19 Nov
(Argentina) Leonela Sánchez	0
(China) Yin Junhua	5
19 Nov
(Germany) Ornella Wahner	5
(Scotland) Victoria Glover	0

Quarterfinals
20 Nov
(North Korea) Jo Son-hwa	5
(Australia) Skye Nicolson	0
20 Nov
(Colombia) Yeni Arias	1
(India) Sonia Chahal	4
20 Nov
(Italy) Alessia Mesiano	0
(Netherlands) Jemyma Betrian	4
20 Nov
(China) Yin Junhua	2
(Germany) Ornella Wahner	3

Semifinals
23 Nov
(North Korea) Jo Son-hwa	0
(India) Sonia Chahal	5
23 Nov
(Netherlands) Jemyma Betrian	0
(Germany) Ornella Wahner	5

Final
24 Nov
(India) Sonia Chahal	1
(Germany) Ornella Wahner	4
