= Boxing at the 2026 Asian Games – Women's 60 kg =

Boxing competitions

Women's 60 kg at the 2026 Asian Games
- Venue: Nishio City Gymnasium
- Date: 26 September – 2 October 2026
- Competitors: 16 from 16 nations

Medalists
gold medal	Lin Yu-ting	Chinese Taipei
silver medal	Yang Chengyu	China
bronze medal	Sitora Turdibekova	Uzbekistan
bronze medal	Priya Ghanghas	India

The women's 60 kilograms event at the 2026 Asian Games took place from 26 September to 2 October 2026 at the Nishio City Gymnasium, Nishio, Aichi Prefecture, Japan.

The gold medal was won by Chinese Taipei's Lin Yu-ting, who defeated China's Yang Chengyu by a 5–0 unanimous decision in the final. Sitora Turdibekova of Uzbekistan and Priya Ghanghas of India took the bronze medals.

== Schedule ==
All times are Japan Standard Time (UTC+09:00)

Date	Time	Event
Saturday, 26 September 2026	12:00	Round of 16
Monday, 28 September 2026	17:00	Quarterfinals
Wednesday, 30 September 2026	13:30	Semifinals
Friday, 2 October 2026	13:15	Final

== Results ==
Legend

- RSC — Won by referee stop contest

Round of 16
Viktoriya Grafeyeva (KAZ)	2
Lin Yu-ting (TPE)	3
Won Un-gyong (PRK)	RSC
Sajeewani Cooray (SRI)
Sitora Turdibekova (UZB)	5
Hà Thị Linh (VIE)	0
Monkhoryn Namuun (MGL)	5
Ayaka Taguchi (JPN)	0
Yang Chengyu (CHN)	3
Punrawee Ruenros (THA)	2
Nesthy Petecio (PHI)	RSC
Mays Abukhadijah (JOR)
Mijgona Samadova (TJK)	5
Fatima Zahra (PAK)	0
Oh Yeon-ji (KOR)	0
Priya Ghanghas (IND)	5

Quarterfinals
Lin Yu-ting (TPE)	4
Won Un-gyong (PRK)	1
Sitora Turdibekova (UZB)	3
Monkhoryn Namuun (MGL)	2
Yang Chengyu (CHN)	5
Nesthy Petecio (PHI)	0
Mijgona Samadova (TJK)	0
Priya Ghanghas (IND)	5

Semifinals
Lin Yu-ting (TPE)	5
Sitora Turdibekova (UZB)	0
Yang Chengyu (CHN)	4
Priya Ghanghas (IND)	1

Final
Lin Yu-ting (TPE)	5
Yang Chengyu (CHN)	0
