= Boxing at the 2020 Summer Olympics – Women's featherweight =

Olympic boxing event

Women's featherweight at the Games of the XXXII Olympiad
- Boxing pictogram
- Venue: Ryōgoku Kokugikan
- Dates: 24 July 2021; 3 August 2021
- Competitors: 21 from 21 nations

Medalists
1st place, gold medalist(s)		Sena Irie	Japan
2nd place, silver medalist(s)		Nesthy Petecio	Philippines
3rd place, bronze medalist(s)		Irma Testa	Italy
3rd place, bronze medalist(s)		Karriss Artingstall	Great Britain

The women's featherweight boxing event at the 2020 Summer Olympics took place from 24 July to 3 August 2021 at the Ryōgoku Kokugikan. 20 boxers from 20 nations competed.

== Background ==
This was the debut appearance of the women's featherweight event. The previous women's tournaments in 2012 and 2016 skipped directly from flyweight (48–51 kg) to lightweight (57–60 kg). Featherweight, at 54–57 kg, fills some of that gap.

Reigning World Champion winner Nesthy Petecio of the Philippines qualified for the Games.

== Qualification ==
A National Olympic Committee (NOC) could enter only 1 qualified boxer in the weight class. There were 20 quota places available for the women's featherweight, allocated as follows:

- 2 places at the 2020 African Boxing Olympic Qualification Tournament
- 4 places at the 2020 Asia & Oceania Boxing Olympic Qualification Tournament
- 6 places at the 2020 European Boxing Olympic Qualification Tournament
- 3 places that were intended to be awarded at the 2021 Pan American Boxing Olympic Qualification Tournament, which was cancelled. These places were instead awarded through the world ranking list to the top boxers from the Americas who had been registered for the qualification tournament.
- 4 places that were intended to be awarded at a World Olympic Qualifying Tournament, which was cancelled. These places were instead awarded through the world ranking list, with one place for each continental zone (Africa, Asia & Oceania, Europe, Americas).
- 1 place for a Tripartite Commission invitation.

The host nation, Japan, was guaranteed a minimum of two places across the five women's boxing events; because Japan qualified boxers in the flyweight and featherweight through the Asia & Oceania tournament, no host places were used in any women's weight class.

== Competition format ==
Like all Olympic boxing events, the competition is a straight single-elimination tournament. The competition begins with a preliminary round, where the number of competitors is reduced to 16, and concludes with a final. As there are fewer than 32 boxers in the competition, a number of boxers will receive a bye through the preliminary round. Both semifinal losers are awarded bronze medals.

Bouts consist of three three-minute rounds with a one-minute break between rounds. A boxer may win by knockout or by points. Scoring is on the "10-point-must" system, with 5 judges scoring each round. Judges consider the "number of blows landed on the target areas, domination of the bout, technique and tactical superiority and competitiveness." Each judge determines a winner for each round, who receives 10 points for the round, and assigns the round's loser a number of points between 7 and 9 based on performance. The judge's scores for each round are added to give a total score for that judge. The boxer with the higher score from a majority of the judges is the winner.

== Schedule ==
The featherweight starts with the round of 32 on 24 July. There is a single rest day before the round of 16 on 26 July, one more before the quarterfinals on 28 July, two more before the semifinals on 31 July, and two more before the final on 3 August. The women's featherweight will be the first boxing final in 2020.

Legend

R32	Round of 32	R16	Round of 16	QF	Quarterfinals	SF	Semifinals	F	Final

Date	Jul 24		Jul 25		Jul 26		Jul 27		Jul 28		Jul 29		Jul 30		Jul 31		Aug 1		Aug 2		Aug 3		Aug 4		Aug 5		Aug 6		Aug 7		Aug 8	
Event	A	E	A	E	A	E	A	E	A	E	A	E	A	E	A	E	A	E	A	E	A	E	A	E	A	E	A	E	A	E	A	E
Women's featherweight	R32				R16				QF						SF						F											

== Results ==
=== Finals ===
Final
Nesthy Petecio (PHI)	0
Sena Irie (JPN)	5

=== Top half ===
Round of 32
Marcelat Sakobi Matshu (COD)	0
Nesthy Petecio (PHI)	5
Nikolina Ćaćić (CRO)	5
Yarisel Ramirez (USA)	0
Liudmila Vorontsova (ROC)	1
Irma Testa (ITA)	4

Round of 16
Lin Yu-ting (TPE)	2
Nesthy Petecio (PHI)	3
Stanimira Petrova (BUL)	2
Yeni Arias (COL)	3
Caroline Veyre (CAN)	5
Nikolina Ćaćić (CRO)	0
Irma Testa (ITA)	5
Michaela Walsh (IRL)	0

Quarterfinals
Nesthy Petecio (PHI)	5
Yeni Arias (COL)	0
Caroline Veyre (CAN)	0
Irma Testa (ITA)	5

Semifinals
Nesthy Petecio (PHI)	4
Irma Testa (ITA)	1

=== Bottom half ===
Round of 32
Karriss Artingstall (GBR)	5
Keamogetse Kenosi (BOT)	0
Yamileth Solorzano (ESA)	0
Sena Irie (JPN)	5

Round of 16
Jucielen Romeu (BRA)	0
Karriss Artingstall (GBR)	5
Im Ae-ji (KOR)	1
Skye Nicolson (AUS)	4
Ramla Ali (SOM)	0
Maria Nechita (ROU)	5
Sena Irie (JPN)	5
Khouloud Hlimi (TUN)	0

Quarterfinals
Karriss Artingstall (GBR)	3
Skye Nicolson (AUS)	2
Maria Nechita (ROU)	2
Sena Irie (JPN)	3

Semifinals
Karriss Artingstall (GBR)	2
Sena Irie (JPN)	3
