= 2018 AIBA Women's World Boxing Championships – Lightweight =

Boxing competitions

Lightweight at the 2018 AIBA Women's World Boxing Championships
- Dates: 15–24 November
- Competitors: 38 from 38 nations

Medalists
| gold medal | Kellie Harrington | Ireland |
| silver medal | Sudaporn Seesondee | Thailand |
| bronze medal | Oh Yeon-ji | South Korea |
| bronze medal | Karina Ibragimova | Kazakhstan |

The Lightweight (60 kg) competition at the 2018 AIBA Women's World Boxing Championships was held from 15 to 24 November 2018.

== Draw ==
=== Preliminaries ===
| | Result | |
|---|---|---|
| (Australia) Anja Stridsman | 3–2 | (Colombia) Dayana Cordero |
| (Brazil) Beatriz Ferreira | 5–0 | (Romania) Cristina Cosma |
| (Sweden) Agnes Alexiusson | 5–0 | (Germany) Janina Bonorden |
| (Indonesia) Huswatun Hasanah | 0–5 | (Switzerland) Sandra Brugger |
| (Canada) Caroline Veyre | 5–0 | (Philippines) Carolyn Calungsod |
| (Japan) Hinami Yanai | 0–5 | (Panama) Elisa Williams |

=== Main draw ===
Round of 32
16 Nov
(Finland) Mira Potkonen | 3
(Australia) Anja Stridsman | 2
16 Nov
(Spain) Melissa González | 0
(Belarus) Ala Yarshevich | 5
16 Nov
(United States) Stacia Suttles | 2
(Thailand) Sudaporn Seesondee | 3
16 Nov
(Mongolia) Monkhoryn Namuun | 5
(Nepal) Punam Rawal | 0
16 Nov
(South Korea) Oh Yeon-ji | 3
(Brazil) Beatriz Ferreira | 2
16 Nov
(Italy) Irma Testa | 2
(England) Paige Murney | 3
16 Nov
(North Korea) Choe Hye-song | 2
(Morocco) Hasnaa Lachgar | 3
16 Nov
(Sweden) Agnes Alexiusson | 5
(Denmark) Ditte Ajaaja Frostholm | 0
16 Nov
(India) Laishram Sarita Devi | 4
(Switzerland) Sandra Brugger | 0
16 Nov
(New Zealand) Troy Garton | 0
(Republic of Ireland) Kellie Harrington | 5
16 Nov
(Uzbekistan) Raykhona Kodirova | 2
(Bulgaria) Denitsa Eliseeva | 3
16 Nov
(Canada) Caroline Veyre | 4
(Poland) Kinga Szlachcic | 1
16 Nov
(Algeria) Imane Khelif | 2
(Kazakhstan) Karina Ibragimova | 3
16 Nov
(France) Amina Zidani | 0
(Chinese Taipei) Wu Shih-yi | 4
16 Nov
(Ukraine) Iuliia Tsyplakova | 1
(China) Yang Wenlu | 4
16 Nov
(Panama) Elisa Williams | 0
(Russia) Anastasia Belyakova | 5

Round of 16
18 Nov
(Finland) Mira Potkonen | 5
(Belarus) Ala Yarshevich | 0
18 Nov
(Thailand) Sudaporn Seesondee | 5
(Mongolia) Monkhoryn Namuun | 0
18 Nov
(South Korea) Oh Yeon-ji | 5
(England) Paige Murney | 0
18 Nov
(Morocco) Hasnaa Lachgar | 2
(Sweden) Agnes Alexiusson | 3
18 Nov
(India) Laishram Sarita Devi | 2
(Republic of Ireland) Kellie Harrington | 3
18 Nov
(Bulgaria) Denitsa Eliseeva | 0
(Canada) Caroline Veyre | 5
18 Nov
(Kazakhstan) Karina Ibragimova | 5
(Chinese Taipei) Wu Shih-yi | 0
18 Nov
(China) Yang Wenlu | 3
(Russia) Anastasia Belyakova | 2

Quarterfinals
20 Nov
(Finland) Mira Potkonen | 1
(Thailand) Sudaporn Seesondee | 4
20 Nov
(South Korea) Oh Yeon-ji | 5
(Sweden) Agnes Alexiusson | 0
20 Nov
(Republic of Ireland) Kellie Harrington | 5
(Canada) Caroline Veyre | 0
20 Nov
(Kazakhstan) Karina Ibragimova | 5
(China) Yang Wenlu | 0

Semifinals
22 Nov
(Thailand) Sudaporn Seesondee | 4
(South Korea) Oh Yeon-ji | 1
22 Nov
(Republic of Ireland) Kellie Harrington | 5
(Kazakhstan) Karina Ibragimova | 0

Final
24 Nov
(Thailand) Sudaporn Seesondee | 2
(Republic of Ireland) Kellie Harrington | 3
