= 2023 IBA Women's World Boxing Championships – Featherweight =

Featherweight at the 2023 IBA Women's World Boxing Championships
- Venue: K. D. Jadhav Indoor Hall
- Location: New Delhi, India
- Dates: 16–25 March
- Competitors: 36 from 36 nations

Medalists
gold medal	Irma Testa	Italy
silver medal	Karina Ibragimova	Kazakhstan
bronze medal	Amina Zidani	France
bronze medal	Svetlana Staneva (Note: The original medalist, Lin Yu-ting from Chinese Taipei has been disqualified from the IBA Women's World Boxing Championships after failing to meet eligibility rules.)	Bulgaria

The Featherweight competition at the 2023 IBA Women's World Boxing Championships was held between 16 and 25 March 2023.

== Results ==
=== Finals ===
Semi-finals
(Italy) Irma Testa	5
(France) Amina Zidani	0
(Kazakhstan) Karina Ibragimova	4
(Chinese Taipei) ~~Lin Yu-ting~~	3

Final
(Italy) Irma Testa	5
(Kazakhstan) Karina Ibragimova	0

=== Top half ===
==== Section 1 ====
Round of 64
(Kenya) Pauline Chege	0
(Guatemala) Leilani Reyes	5

Round of 32
(Italy) Irma Testa	4
(Guatemala) Leilani Reyes	1
(Vietnam) Nguyễn Thị Thanh Hảo	4
(South Africa) Phiwokuhle Mnguni	1
(Sri Lanka) Kasthuri Hansika
(Japan) Satsuki Yoshizawa	w/o
(Hungary) Szabina Szűcs	0
(Brazil) Jucielen Romeu	5

Round of 16
(Italy) Irma Testa	5
(Vietnam) Nguyễn Thị Thanh Hảo	0
(Japan) Satsuki Yoshizawa	0
(Brazil) Jucielen Romeu	5

Quarterfinals
(Italy) Irma Testa	5
(Brazil) Jucielen Romeu	0

==== Section 2 ====
Round of 64
(Australia) Tina Rahimi	5
(Uzbekistan) Makhliyo Khabibullaeva	0

Round of 32
(Puerto Rico) Ashleyann Lozada	4
(China) Xu Zichun	3
(France) Amina Zidani	5
(Russia) Liudmila Vorontsova	0
(Turkey) Elif Nur Turhan	RSC
(Afghanistan) Sadia Bromand
(Australia) Tina Rahimi	0
(India) Manisha Moun	5

Round of 16
(Puerto Rico) Ashleyann Lozada	1
(France) Amina Zidani	4
(Turkey) Elif Nur Turhan
(India) Manisha Moun	RSC

Quarterfinals
(France) Amina Zidani	4
(India) Manisha Moun	1

=== Bottom half ===
==== Section 3 ====
Round of 64
(Mongolia) Monkhoryn Namuun	0
(Colombia) Valeria Arboleda	5

Round of 32
(Kazakhstan) Karina Ibragimova	RSC
(Colombia) Valeria Arboleda
(New Zealand) Jennifer Peters	1
(Azerbaijan) Mahsati Hamzayeva	4
(Nepal) Chandra Kala Thapa	0
(Venezuela) Omailyn Alcalá	5
(Philippines) Nesthy Petecio	5
(Trinidad and Tobago) Tianna Guy	0

Round of 16
(Kazakhstan) Karina Ibragimova	RSC
(Azerbaijan) Mahsati Hamzayeva
(Venezuela) Omailyn Alcalá	4
(Philippines) Nesthy Petecio	3

Quarterfinals
(Kazakhstan) Karina Ibragimova	5
(Venezuela) Omailyn Alcalá	0

==== Section 4 ====
Round of 64
(Mexico) Jennifer Carrillo	0
(Romania) Claudia Nechita	5

Round of 32
(Bulgaria) Svetlana Staneva	DSQ
(Tunisia) Eya Chihaoui
(South Korea) Jin Hye-jeong
(Thailand) Nilawan Techasuep	RSC
(Mali) Marine Camara
(Spain) Jennifer Fernández	RSC-I
(Romania) Claudia Nechita	0
(Chinese Taipei) ~~Lin Yu-ting~~	4

Round of 16
(Bulgaria) Svetlana Staneva	5
(Thailand) Nilawan Techasuep	0
(Spain) Jennifer Fernández	0
(Chinese Taipei) ~~Lin Yu-ting~~	5

Quarterfinals
(Bulgaria) Svetlana Staneva	2
(Chinese Taipei) ~~Lin Yu-ting~~	5
