= 2025 IBA Women's World Boxing Championships – Featherweight =

Featherweight at the 2025 IBA Women's World Boxing Championships
- Venue: Sportski centar Čair
- Location: Niš, Serbia
- Dates: 10–14 March (preliminaries/semifinals); 16 March (final)
- Competitors: 30 from 30 nations

Medalists
gold medal	Anđela Branković	Serbia
silver medal	Punrawee Ruenros	Thailand
bronze medal	Cai Yan	China
bronze medal	Esra Yıldız	Turkey

The Featherweight competition at the 2025 IBA Women's World Boxing Championships was held from 10 to 16 March 2025.

== Results ==
=== Finals ===
Semi-finals
(China) Cai Yan	1
(Thailand) Punrawee Ruenros	4
(Serbia) Anđela Branković	5
(Turkey) Esra Yıldız	0

Final
(Thailand) Punrawee Ruenros	0
(Serbia) Anđela Branković	5

=== Top half ===
==== Section 1 ====
Round of 32
(Puerto Rico) Ashleyann Lozada	1
(Colombia) Valeria Arboleda	3
(South Africa) Imitha Mkala
(Russia) Liudmila Vorontsova	w/o
(Belarus) Marina Muliarchyk
(China) Cai Yan	RSC

Round of 16
(Kazakhstan) Karina Ibragimova	5
(Colombia) Valeria Arboleda	0
(Russia) Liudmila Vorontsova	1
(China) Cai Yan	4

Quarterfinals
(Kazakhstan) Karina Ibragimova	1
(China) Cai Yan	4

==== Section 2 ====
Round of 32
(Thailand) Punrawee Ruenros	4
(Romania) Lăcrămioara Perijoc	1
(North Korea) Ku Hyang-suk	5
(Mongolia) Tömörhuyagiin Bolortuul	0
(Montenegro) Bojana Gojković
(Kenya) Pauline Chege	w/o
(Mexico) Diana Pérez	0
(Tajikistan) Mijgona Samadova	5

Round of 16
(Thailand) Punrawee Ruenros	5
(North Korea) Ku Hyang-suk	0
(Kenya) Pauline Chege
(Tajikistan) Mijgona Samadova	RSC

Quarterfinals
(Thailand) Punrawee Ruenros	4
(Tajikistan) Mijgona Samadova	1

=== Bottom half ===
==== Section 3 ====
Round of 32
(Uzbekistan) Nigina Uktamova	RSC
(Georgia (country)) Khuraman Kasumova
(Cuba) Melani Girado	w/o
(Tanzania) Halima Vunjabei
(Spain) Jennifer Fernández	5
(Kyrgyzstan) Aynazik Rustambek Kyzy	0
(Republic of Ireland) Michaela Walsh	0
(Serbia) Anđela Branković	5

Round of 16
(Uzbekistan) Nigina Uktamova	RSC
(Cuba) Melani Girado
(Spain) Jennifer Fernández	0
(Serbia) Anđela Branković	5

Quarterfinals
(Uzbekistan) Nigina Uktamova	0
(Serbia) Anđela Branković	5

==== Section 4 ====
Round of 32
(Vietnam) Nguyễn Huyền Trân	0
(Venezuela) Diana Maestre	5
(Brazil) Yasmim Bodziak	5
(Zimbabwe) Lovelight Fusire	0
(Afghanistan) Khursid Mohammadi
(Azerbaijan) Aynur Mikayilova	RSC

Round of 16
(Venezuela) Diana Maestre	RSC
(Brazil) Yasmim Bodziak
(Azerbaijan) Aynur Mikayilova	0
(Turkey) Esra Yıldız	5

Quarterfinals
(Venezuela) Diana Maestre	0
(Turkey) Esra Yıldız	5
