= 2022 IBA Women's World Boxing Championships – Featherweight =

Featherweight at the 2022 IBA Women's World Boxing Championships
- Venue: Başakşehir Youth and Sports Facility
- Location: Istanbul, Turkey
- Dates: 9–19 May
- Competitors: 36 from 36 nations

Medalists
gold medal	Lin Yu-ting	Chinese Taipei
silver medal	Irma Testa	Italy
bronze medal	Karina Ibragimova	Kazakhstan
bronze medal	Manisha Moun	India

The featherweight competition at the 2022 IBA Women's World Boxing Championships was held from 9 to 19 May 2022.

== Results ==
=== Finals ===
Semi-finals
(Kazakhstan) Karina Ibragimova	0
(Chinese Taipei) Lin Yu-ting	5
(Italy) Irma Testa	5
(India) Manisha Moun	0

Final
(Chinese Taipei) Lin Yu-ting	4
(Italy) Irma Testa	1

=== Top half ===
==== Section 1 ====
First round fights

	Score	
Claudia Nechita (Romania)	4–1	(Hungary) Szabina Szűcs

Round of 32
(Kazakhstan) Karina Ibragimova	5
(Romania) Claudia Nechita	0
(Finland) Vilma Vitanen	1
(Spain) Jennifer Fernández	4
(Ukraine) Valeriia Yeroshenko	5
(Guatemala) Leilany Reyes	0
(United States) Amelia Moore	0
(Republic of Ireland) Michaela Walsh	5

Round of 16
(Kazakhstan) Karina Ibragimova	5
(Spain) Jennifer Fernández	0
(Ukraine) Valeriia Yeroshenko	2
(Republic of Ireland) Michaela Walsh	3

Quarterfinals
(Kazakhstan) Karina Ibragimova	5
(Republic of Ireland) Michaela Walsh	0

==== Section 2 ====
First round fights

	Score	
Lin Yu-ting (Chinese Taipei)	4–1	(France) Sthelyne Grosy

Round of 32
(Brazil) Jucielen Romeu	5
(Kenya) Beatrice Akoth	0
(Colombia) Yeni Arias	4
(Australia) Tina Rahimi	1
(South Korea) Im Ae-ji	4
(Thailand) Apisada Tantawa	1
(Chinese Taipei) Lin Yu-ting	5
(Tajikistan) Mijgona Samadova	0

Round of 16
(Brazil) Jucielen Romeu	3
(Colombia) Yeni Arias	2
(South Korea) Im Ae-ji	1
(Chinese Taipei) Lin Yu-ting	4

Quarterfinals
(Brazil) Jucielen Romeu	0
(Chinese Taipei) Lin Yu-ting	5

=== Bottom half ===
==== Section 3 ====
First round fights

	Score	
Irma Testa (Italy)	4–1	(Mali) Fatou Camara

Round of 32
(Japan) Mona Kimura
(Italy) Irma Testa	RSC
(Poland) Sandra Kruk	RSC
(Croatia) Dea Bolanča
(Uzbekistan) Sitora Turdibekova	5
(Trinidad and Tobago) Tianna Guy	0
(South Africa) Phiwokuhle Minguni	0
(Paraguay) Minerva Montiel	5

Round of 16
(Italy) Irma Testa	5
(Poland) Sandra Kruk	0
(Uzbekistan) Sitora Turdibekova	5
(Paraguay) Minerva Montiel	0

Quarterfinals
(Italy) Irma Testa	4
(Uzbekistan) Sitora Turdibekova	1

==== Section 4 ====
First round fights

	Score	
Esra Özyol (Turkey)	5–0	(Morocco) Widad Bertal

Round of 32
(India) Manisha Moun	5
(Nepal) Chandra Thapa	0
(Puerto Rico) Ashleyann Lozada	1
(Bulgaria) Svetlana Staneva	4
(Democratic Republic of the Congo) Matshu Sakobi	2
(Venezuela) Johana Gómez	3
(Turkey) Esra Özyol	0
(Mongolia) Monkhoryn Namuun	3

Round of 16
(India) Manisha Moun	4
(Bulgaria) Svetlana Staneva	1
(Venezuela) Johana Gómez	1
(Mongolia) Monkhoryn Namuun	4

Quarterfinals
(India) Manisha Moun	4
(Mongolia) Monkhoryn Namuun	1
