= Karriss Artingstall =

English boxer (born 1994)

Personal information
- Born: 23 November 1994 (age 31) Macclesfield, Cheshire, England
- Height: 1.7 m (5 ft 7 in)
- Weight: Featherweight

Boxing career
- Stance: Southpaw

Boxing record
- Total fights: 7
- Wins: 7
- Win by KO: 1
Medal record
Women's amateur boxing
Representing Great Britain
Olympic Games
Bronze medal – third place	2020 Tokyo	Featherweight
Representing England
World Championships
Bronze medal – third place	2019 Ulan-Ude	Featherweight
European Championships
Silver medal – second place	2019 Alcobendas	Featherweight

Karriss Artingstall (born 23 November 1994) is an English former professional boxer. She was the inaugural British female featherweight champion. As an amateur, Artingstall won a bronze medal at the delayed 2020 Summer Olympics, silver at the 2019 European Championships and bronze at the 2019 World Championships.

== Amateur boxing career ==
At national level, Artingstall won gold medals at the 2012 and 2013 Junior Championships and the 2018 Elite Championships.

In 2019 she won a silver medal at the European Championships, defeating Mona Mestiaen of France (5:0) in the preliminaries; Jennifer Fernández Romero of Spain (5:0) in the quarter-finals; Stanimira Petrova of Bulgaria (5:0) in the semi-finals; before losing to Irma Testa of Italy (0:5) in the final.

She then won a bronze medal at the 2019 World Championships, defeating Yarisel Ramirez of the United States (5:0), Jo Son-hwa of North Korea (3:0), and Mijgona Samadova of Tajikistan (5:0) in the preliminaries; Yodgoroy Mirzaeva of Uzbekistan (5:0) in the quarter-finals; before losing to eventual winner Nesthy Petecio of the Philippines (4:1) in the semi-finals.

=== 2020 Olympics ===
In a bid to secure a place at the 2020 Summer Olympics, Artingstall competed in the 2020 European Olympic Qualifiers. She won her first bout, defeating Helina Bruyevich of Bulgaria (5:0) in the preliminaries but suffered defeat against Stanimira Petrova of Bulgaria (1:4) in the quarter-finals. Artingstall was able to secure her place after defeating Stephanie Thour of Sweden (5:0) in a box-off.

Her first bout of the Olympic featherweight competition came against Keamogetse Sadie Kenosi of Botswana, with Artingstall emerging victorious with a score of 5:0. Following a 5:0 victory against Jucielen Romeu of Brazil, Artingstall advanced to the quarter-finals to defeat Skye Nicolson of Australia (3:2). She lost her semi-final bout against Sena Irie of Japan (3:2) to end the Games with a bronze medal.

== Professional boxing career ==
Artingstall joined the professional boxing ranks in 2022 signing a promotional deal with Boxxer. She made her pro-debut on 22 June that year at Coventry Skydome defeating Vaida Masiokaite on points in a six-round contest.

She faced Raven Chapman for the inaugural British female featherweight title at the Royal Albert Hall in London on 7 March 2025. Artingstall knocked Chapman to the canvas in the second round and eventually won via unanimous decision.

Having not fought since her title win in March 2025, Artingstall announced her retirement from professional boxing in a social media post on 31 August 2026, saying she had achieved "things people dream of" and adding: "Thank you, boxing. It's been some journey."

== Personal life ==
Artingstall was in a relationship with welterweight world champion Lauren Price for several years. She is a former member of the Royal Horse Artillery.

== Professional boxing record ==
7 fights	7 wins	0 losses
By knockout	1	0
By decision	6	0

No.	Result	Record	Opponent	Type	Round, time	Date	Location	Notes
7	Win	7–0	Raven Chapman	UD	10	7 Mar 2025	Royal Albert Hall, London, England	Won inaugural British female featherweight title
6	Win	6–0	Lila dos Santos Furtado	PTS	8	20 Jan 2024	Echo Arena, Liverpool, England	
5	Win	5–0	Vanessa Bradford	RTD	2 (8)	21 Oct 2023	York Hall, London, England	
4	Win	4–0	Jade Taylor	PTS	8	27 May 2023	Vitality Stadium, Bournemouth, England	
3	Win	3–0	Linzi Buczynskyj	PTS	6	25 Mar 2023	Manchester Arena, Manchester, England	
2	Win	2–0	Marina Sakharov	PTS	6	15 Oct 2022	O2 Arena, London, England	
1	Win	1–0	Vaida Masiokaite	PTS	6	25 Jun 2022	Coventry Skydome, Coventry, England	
