= 2026 European Boxing Championships – Women's 57 kg =

Women's 57 kg at the 2026 European Boxing Championships
- Venue: Asics Arena
- Location: Sofia, Bulgaria
- Dates: 19–25 September
- Competitors: 19 from 19 nations

Medalists
gold medal	Vladislava Kukhta	Hungary
silver medal	Liudmila Vorontsova	Russia
bronze medal	Michaela Walsh	Ireland
bronze medal	Esra Yıldız Kahraman	Turkey

The women's 57 kg competition at the 2026 European Boxing Championships was held from 19 to 25 September 2026.

== Results ==
=== Final ===
Final; 25 September
(Hungary) Vladislava Kukhta	5
(Russia) Liudmila Vorontsova	0

=== Top half ===
Round of 32; 19 September
(Bulgaria) Stanimira Petrova	5
(Slovakia) Bibiana Lovašová	0

Round of 16; 21 September
(Poland) Julia Szeremeta	1
(Bulgaria) Stanimira Petrova	4
(Montenegro) Bojana Gojković	0
(Republic of Ireland) Michaela Walsh	5
(France) Amina Zidani	5
(Ukraine) Veronika Pylypenko	0
(Greece) Panagiota Kouzilou
(Hungary) Vladislava Kukhta	RSC

Quarterfinals; 23 September
(Bulgaria) Stanimira Petrova	0
(Republic of Ireland) Michaela Walsh	5
(France) Amina Zidani	0
(Hungary) Vladislava Kukhta	5

Semifinals; 24 September
(Republic of Ireland) Michaela Walsh	1
(Hungary) Vladislava Kukhta	4

=== Bottom half ===
Round of 32; 19 September
(Russia) Liudmila Vorontsova	5
(Serbia) Jelena Zekić	0
(Italy) Irma Testa	1
(England) Elise Glynn	4

Round of 16; 21 September
(Netherlands) Gabriella Weerheim	0
(Russia) Liudmila Vorontsova	5
(Belarus) Maryna Muliarchyk	5
(Belgium) Sarah Renders	0
(Romania) Lăcrămioara Perijoc	5
(Croatia) Nikolina Ćaćić	0
(England) Elise Glynn	0
(Turkey) Esra Yıldız Kahraman	5

Quarterfinals; 23 September
(Russia) Liudmila Vorontsova	4
(Belarus) Maryna Muliarchyk	1
(Romania) Lăcrămioara Perijoc	0
(Turkey) Esra Yıldız Kahraman	5

Semifinals; 24 September
(Russia) Liudmila Vorontsova	3
(Turkey) Esra Yıldız Kahraman	2
