= Boxing at the 2023 European Games – Women's featherweight =

Women's featherweight boxing at the 2023 European Games
- Venue: Nowy Targ Arena
- Location: Nowy Targ, Poland
- Dates: 24 June – 2 July
- Competitors: 21 from 21 nations

Medalists
gold medal	Amina Zidani	France
silver medal	Svetlana Staneva	Bulgaria
bronze medal	Michaela Walsh	Ireland
bronze medal	Irma Testa	Italy

The women's featherweight boxing event at the 2023 European Games was held between 24 June and 2 July 2023.

== Results ==
=== Finals ===
Semi-finals
Svetlana Staneva (BUL)	4
Irma Testa (ITA)	1
Michaela Walsh (IRL)	1
Amina Zidani (FRA)	4

Final
Svetlana Staneva (BUL)	1
Amina Zidani (FRA)	4

=== Top half ===
==== Section 1 ====
Round of 32
Asya Ari (GER)	2
Claudia Nechita (ROU)	3

Round of 16
Svetlana Staneva (BUL)	5
Claudia Nechita (ROU)	0
Vilma Viitanen (FIN)	1
Julia Szeremeta (POL)	4

Quarterfinals
Svetlana Staneva (BUL)	5
Julia Szeremeta (POL)	0

==== Section 2 ====
Round of 32
Ajla Vojić (BIH)
Marianna Basanets (UKR)	RSC
Anđela Branković (SRB)	0
Elise Glynn (GBR)	5

Round of 16
Jennifer Fernández (ESP)	5
Marianna Basanets (UKR)	0
Elise Glynn (GBR)	2
Irma Testa (ITA)	3

Quarterfinals
Jennifer Fernández (ESP)	0
Irma Testa (ITA)	5

=== Bottom half ===
==== Section 3 ====
Round of 32
Olga Papadatou (GRE)	0
Michaela Walsh (IRL)	5

Round of 16
Ayşen Taşkın (TUR)	0
Michaela Walsh (IRL)	5
Dea Bolanča (CRO)	0
Melissa Mortensen (DEN)	5

Quarterfinals
Michaela Walsh (IRL)	5
Melissa Mortensen (DEN)	0

==== Section 4 ====
Round of 32
Amina Zidani (FRA)	5
Ana Marija Milisic (SUI)	0

Round of 16
Mahsati Hamzayeva (AZE)	5
Tatevik Khachatryan (ARM)	0
Amina Zidani (FRA)	4
Lucie Sedláčková (CZE)	1

Quarterfinals
Mahsati Hamzayeva (AZE)	0
Amina Zidani (FRA)	5
