= Sonia Lather =

Indian boxer (born 1992)

Personal information
- Nationality: Indian
- Born: 10 February 1992 (age 34) Jind, Haryana, India

Sport
- Sport: Boxing
- Weight class: Featherweight (57 Kg)
Medal record
Women's boxing
Representing India
World Championships
Silver medal – second place	2016 Astana	Featherweight
Asian Championships
Silver medal – second place	2012 Ulaanbaatar	Bantamweight (54 Kg)
Silver medal – second place	2017 Tashkent	Featherweight
South Asian Games
Gold medal – first place	2019 Kathmandu–Pokhara	57 kg

Sonia Lather (born 10 February 1992) is an Indian amateur boxer. She was a silver medallist at the 2016 AIBA Women's World Boxing Championships, and a twice silver medallist at the Asian Amateur Boxing Championships.

== Early life and career ==
Lather was born on 10 February 1992 in Jind, Haryana, to Prem Singh and Nirmal Devi. According to lather, after initially trying kabaddi and wrestling, she started playing boxing when she was 18 years old. She is coached by Anoop Kumar.

Lather won silver medal in the 54 kg division at the 2012 Asian Women's Amateur Boxing Championships after losing by 8–14 in the final to China's Liu Kejia. Later in the year, she competed at the 2012 AIBA Women's World Boxing Championships, where she made first-round exit after losing by 9–18 against Elena Walendzik of Germany.

At the 2016 AIBA Women's World Boxing Championships, Lather entered the quarter-finals after defeating Nomin Deutsch of Germany by 3–0 in the 57 kg division. She then registered wins over Aneta Rygielska of Poland and Kazakhstan's Aizhan Khojabekova by a scoreline of 3–0 in the quarterfinal and the semifinal respectively. In the final, she had the upper hand in the first round against the top-seed Alessia Mesiano of Italy, but the Italian boxer made comeback in the next three rounds, winning the bout by 2–1.

Lather entered the quarter-finals of the 2017 Asian Women's Amateur Boxing Championships after defeating Kurogi Kana of Japan with an attacking play. Her next bout against Nazym Ichshanova of Kazakhstan was closely contested, which she won after a split decision. After a unanimous decision victory over Uzbekistan's Yodgoroy Mirzaeva in the semi-final, lather lost the title bout against China's Yin Junhua in a split decision.

Lather represented Railways Sports Promotion Board (RSPB) at the 2018 Senior National Boxing Championships in the featherweight division (54–57 kg). She won the championships after defeating Shashi Chopra of Haryana in the final by 5–0. After receiving byes in the early rounds of the 2018 Asian Games, Lather lost to North Korea's Jo Son-hwa by 0–5 in the quarter-final of the featherweight division. The bout was slow-paced and each boxer was warned once for clinching.
