= Boxing at the 2018 Commonwealth Games =

Boxing competitions

- Venue: Oxenford Studios
- Dates: 5–14 April 2018
- Competitors: 217 from 48 nations

Boxing at the 2018 Commonwealth Games was the 21st appearance of the Boxing at the Commonwealth Games. The boxing competition was held at the Oxenford Studios in the Gold Coast, Australia from 5 April to 14 April 2018.

A total of 16 events are scheduled to be held, 10 for men and six for women. Additional women's events were added by the Commonwealth Games Federation (CGF) to get to a gender equal number of events overall for men and women.

== Medal table ==
Key

* Host nation (Australia)

Rank	Nation	Gold	Silver	Bronze	Total
1	England	6	1	2	9
2	India	3	3	3	9
3	Australia*	3	2	3	8
4	Wales	2	1	1	4
5	New Zealand	1	0	4	5
6	Namibia	1	0	0	1
7	Northern Ireland	0	6	2	8
8	Canada	0	1	5	6
9	Cameroon	0	1	0	1
9	Samoa	0	1	0	1
11	Sri Lanka	0	0	3	3
12	Nigeria	0	0	2	2
12	Scotland	0	0	2	2
14	Fiji	0	0	1	1
14	Ghana	0	0	1	1
14	Kenya	0	0	1	1
14	Seychelles	0	0	1	1
14	Uganda	0	0	1	1
Totals (18 entries)		16	16	32	64

== Medallists ==
=== Men ===
Event	Gold	Silver	Bronze
Light flyweight	Galal Yafai; England	Amit Panghal; India	Thiwanka Ranasinghe; Sri Lanka
Light flyweight	Galal Yafai; England	Amit Panghal; India	Juma Miiro; Uganda
Flyweight	Gaurav Solanki; India	Brendan Irvine; Northern Ireland	Reece McFadden; Scotland
Flyweight	Gaurav Solanki; India	Brendan Irvine; Northern Ireland	Vidanalange Bandara; Sri Lanka
Bantamweight	Peter McGrail; England	Kurt Walker; Northern Ireland	Eric Basran; Canada
Bantamweight	Peter McGrail; England	Kurt Walker; Northern Ireland	Mohammad Hussamuddin; India
Lightweight	Harry Garside; Australia	Manish Kaushik; India	James McGivern; Northern Ireland
Lightweight	Harry Garside; Australia	Manish Kaushik; India	Mickey McDonagh; Wales
Light welterweight	Jonas Jonas; Namibia	Thomas Blumenfeld; Canada	Luke McCormack; England
Light welterweight	Jonas Jonas; Namibia	Thomas Blumenfeld; Canada	Jesse Lartey; Ghana
Welterweight	Pat McCormack; England	Aidan Walsh; Northern Ireland	Winston Hill; Fiji
Welterweight	Pat McCormack; England	Aidan Walsh; Northern Ireland	Manoj Kumar; India
Middleweight	Vikas Krishan Yadav; India	Wilfried Ntsengue; Cameroon	Steven Donnelly; Northern Ireland
Middleweight	Vikas Krishan Yadav; India	Wilfried Ntsengue; Cameroon	John Docherty; Scotland
Light heavyweight	Sammy Lee; Wales	Ato Plodzicki-Faoagali; Samoa	Clay Waterman; Australia
Light heavyweight	Sammy Lee; Wales	Ato Plodzicki-Faoagali; Samoa	Harley O'Reilly; Canada
Heavyweight	David Nyika; New Zealand	Jason Whateley; Australia	Naman Tanwar; India
Heavyweight	David Nyika; New Zealand	Jason Whateley; Australia	Cheavon Clarke; England
Super heavyweight	Frazer Clarke; England	Satish Kumar; India	Keddy Agnes; Seychelles
Super heavyweight	Frazer Clarke; England	Satish Kumar; India	Patrick Mailata; New Zealand

=== Women ===
Event	Gold	Silver	Bronze
Light flyweight	Mary Kom; India	Kristina O'Hara; Northern Ireland	Anusha Koddithuwakku; Sri Lanka
Light flyweight	Mary Kom; India	Kristina O'Hara; Northern Ireland	Tasmyn Benny; New Zealand
Flyweight	Lisa Whiteside; England	Carly McNaul; Northern Ireland	Taylah Robertson; Australia
Flyweight	Lisa Whiteside; England	Carly McNaul; Northern Ireland	Christine Ongare; Kenya
Featherweight	Skye Nicolson; Australia	Michaela Walsh; Northern Ireland	Alexis Pritchard; New Zealand
Featherweight	Skye Nicolson; Australia	Michaela Walsh; Northern Ireland	Sabrina Aubin-Boucher; Canada
Lightweight	Anja Stridsman; Australia	Paige Murney; England	Troy Garton; New Zealand
Lightweight	Anja Stridsman; Australia	Paige Murney; England	Yetunde Odunuga; Nigeria
Welterweight	Sandy Ryan; England	Rosie Eccles; Wales	Kaye Scott; Australia
Welterweight	Sandy Ryan; England	Rosie Eccles; Wales	Marie-Jeanne Parent; Canada
Middleweight	Lauren Price; Wales	Caitlin Parker; Australia	Millicent Agboegbulem; Nigeria
Middleweight	Lauren Price; Wales	Caitlin Parker; Australia	Tammara Thibeault; Canada

== Participating nations ==
There are 48 participating nations in boxing with a total of 217 athletes.

- Anguilla (2 athletes)
- Antigua and Barbuda (2)
- Australia (13)
- Bahamas (2)
- Barbados (2)
- Botswana (4)
- Cameroon (8)
- Canada (7)
- Cayman Islands (2)
- Cyprus (1)
- Dominica (2)
- England (12)
- Fiji (2)
- Ghana (7)
- Grenada (2)
- Guernsey (1)
- Guyana (2)
- India (12)
- Jamaica (1)
- Kenya (10)
- Kiribati (2)
- Lesotho (6)
- Mauritius (7)
- Mozambique (1)
- Namibia (3)
- Nauru (2)
- New Zealand (8)
- Nigeria (8)
- Niue (1)
- Northern Ireland (12)
- Pakistan (4)
- Papua New Guinea (4)
- Saint Lucia (3)
- Samoa (4)
- Scotland (11)
- Seychelles (3)
- Sierra Leone (2)
- Solomon Islands (1)
- South Africa (2)
- Sri Lanka (6)
- Swaziland (2)
- Tanzania (4)
- Tonga (5)
- Trinidad and Tobago (2)
- Uganda (5)
- Vanuatu (3)
- Wales (7)
- Zambia (5)
