= Boxing at the 2022 Asian Games – Women's 57 kg =

Boxing competitions

Women's 57 kg at the 2022 Asian Games
- Venue: Hangzhou Gymnasium
- Date: 29 September – 5 October 2023
- Competitors: 16 from 16 nations

Medalists
gold medal	Lin Yu-ting	Chinese Taipei
silver medal	Karina Ibragimova	Kazakhstan
bronze medal	Mijgona Samadova	Tajikistan

The women's 57 kilograms event at the 2018 Asian Games took place from 29 September to 5 October 2023 at Hangzhou Gymnasium, Hangzhou, China.

The competition was a straight single-elimination tournament. Both semifinal losers were awarded bronze medals. Lin Yu-ting of Taiwan won the gold medal, which was Taiwan's first gold medal in boxing at the Asian Games.

== Schedule ==
All times are China Standard Time (UTC+08:00)

Date	Time	Event
Friday, 29 September 2023	14:00	Preliminaries – R16
Sunday, 1 October 2023	14:00	Quarterfinals
Wednesday, 4 October 2023	14:00	Semifinals
Thursday, 5 October 2023	19:00	Final

== Results ==
Legend

- RSC — Won by referee stop contest

Preliminaries – R16
Xu Zichun (CHN)	0
Parveen Hooda (IND)	5
Sitora Turdibekova (UZB)	5
Fatima Zahra (PAK)	0
Nesthy Petecio (PHI)	1
Lin Yu-ting (TPE)	4
Chandra Kala Thapa (NEP)	0
Porntip Buapa (THA)	5
Karina Ibragimova (KAZ)	5
Paek Jin-hyang (PRK)	0
Monkhoryn Namuun (MGL)	RSC
Jin Hye-jeong (KOR)
Chan Man Man (MAC)
Satsuki Yoshizawa (JPN)	RSC
Nguyễn Huyền Trân (VIE)	0
Mijgona Samadova (TJK)	5

Quarterfinals
Parveen Hooda (IND)	5
Sitora Turdibekova (UZB)	0
Lin Yu-ting (TPE)	5
Porntip Buapa (THA)	0
Karina Ibragimova (KAZ)	5
Monkhoryn Namuun (MGL)	0
Satsuki Yoshizawa (JPN)	0
Mijgona Samadova (TJK)	5

Semifinals
Parveen Hooda (IND)	0
Lin Yu-ting (TPE)	5
Karina Ibragimova (KAZ)	3
Mijgona Samadova (TJK)	2

Final
Lin Yu-ting (TPE)	5
Karina Ibragimova (KAZ)	0

Parveen Hooda was originally awarded a bronze medal, but was stripped of it in May 2024 due to a doping whereabouts failure.
