= Sonia Chahal =

Indian boxer

- Chahal with Manisha Moun at 2nd India Open International Boxing Tournament Guwahati

Personal information
- Nationality: Indian
- Born: 3 August 1997 (age 29) Nimri village, Bhiwani district, Haryana, India
- Height: 172 cm (5 ft 8 in)

Sport
- Sport: Boxing
- Weight class: Featherweight (57 Kg)
- Club: Bhiwani boxing club
Medal record
Women's amateur boxing
Representing India
World Championships
Silver medal – second place	2018 New Delhi	Featherweight
Asian Championships
Bronze medal – third place	2019 Bangkok	Featherweight

Sonia Chahal is an Indian amateur boxer. She is a silver medallist at the 2018 AIBA Women's World Boxing Championships.

== Early life and career ==
Chahal was born in Nimri village of Haryana state's Bhiwani district. She is the younger of two children of Mr. Jai Bhagwan, a farmer, and homemaker mother Neelam.

She started boxing in 2011 after taking inspiration from Kavita Chahal. And after six months of training at the Bhiwani Boxing Club under the coach Jagdish Singh, she won silver medal at the school-level national championships in the same year. She continued her training in Bhiwani for the next three years.

Chahal won silver medal in the featherweight division (54–57 kg) of the 2018 AIBA Women's World Boxing Championships after losing in the final to Germany's Ornella Wahner.
