= Boxing at the 2019 Pan American Games – Women's 57 kg =

Women's Bantamweight at the 2019 Pan American Games
- Venue: Miguel Grau Coliseum
- Dates: July 27 – August 1, 2019
- Competitors: 8 from 8 nations

Medalists
Gold medal	Leonela Sánchez	Argentina
Silver medal	Jucielen Romeu	Brazil
Bronze medal	Yeni Arias	Colombia
Bronze medal	Yarisel Ramirez	United States

The women's featherweight competition of the boxing events at the 2019 Pan American Games in Lima, Peru, was held between the 27 of July and the 1 of August 2019 at the Miguel Grau Coliseum.

Like all Pan American boxing events, the competition is a straight single-elimination tournament. Both semifinal losers are awarded bronze medals, so no boxers compete again after their first loss. Bouts consist of a 3 rounds "10-point must" scoring system used in the pro game, where the winner of each round must be awarded 10 points and the loser a lesser amount, and the elimination of the padded headgear. Five judges scored each bout. The winner will be the boxer who scored the most at the end of the match.

== Results ==
=== Bracket ===
Quarterfinals; July 27, 2019
Yeni Arias (COL)	3
Sabrina Aubin (CAN)	2
Leonela Sánchez (ARG)	5
Fiorela Goicochea (PER)	0
Yarisel Ramirez (USA)	5
Yamileth Solórzano (ESA)	0
Keyling Reyes (NCA)
Jucielen Romeu (BRA)	RSC

Semifinals; July 30, 2019
Yeni Arias (COL)	0
Leonela Sánchez (ARG)	5
Yarisel Ramirez (USA)	0
Jucielen Romeu (BRA)	5

Final; August 1, 2019
Leonela Sánchez (ARG)	4
Jucielen Romeu (BRA)	1
