= 2016 AIBA Women's World Boxing Championships – Featherweight =

Boxing competitions

Featherweight at the 2016 AIBA Women's World Boxing Championships
- Dates: 20–27 May
- Competitors: 26 from 26 nations

Medalists
| gold medal | Alessia Mesiano | Italy |
| silver medal | Sonia Lather | India |
| bronze medal | Denitsa Eliseeva | Bulgaria |
| bronze medal | Aizhan Khojabekova | Kazakhstan |

The Featherweight (57 kg) competition at the 2016 AIBA Women's World Boxing Championships was held from 20 to 27 May 2016.

== Draw ==
Round of 32
20 May
(Chinese Taipei) Huang Hsiao-wen | 1
(United States) Stalacia Leggett | 2
20 May
(Russia) Viktoriia Kuleshova | 3
(South Korea) Choi Jin-sun | 0
20 May
(Australia) Anja Stridsman | TKO
(Croatia) Sara Beram
20 May
(Uzbekistan) Muhayyohon Esonboyeva | 0
(Canada) Sabrina Aubin | 3
20 May
(Panama) Karol Hibbert | 0
(Japan) Misuzu Hayashi | 3
20 May
(Ukraine) Maryna Malovana | 3
(Hungary) Vivien Csombor | 0
20 May
(Belarus) Yuliya Apanasovich | 0
(China) Gao Meiling | 3
20 May
(Germany) Nomin Deutsch | 3
(Montenegro) Tamara Radunović | 0
20 May
(Mongolia) Myagmaryn Gündegmaa | 0
(India) Sonia Lather | 3
20 May
(Turkey) Satı Burcu | 2
(Republic of Ireland) Moira McElligott | 1

Round of 16
22 May
(Italy) Alessia Mesiano | 3
(United States) Stalacia Leggett | 0
22 May
(Russia) Viktoriia Kuleshova | 3
(Australia) Anja Stridsman | 0
22 May
(Azerbaijan) Mahsati Hamzayeva | 2
(Canada) Sabrina Aubin | 0
22 May
(Japan) Misuzu Hayashi | 0
(Bulgaria) Denitsa Eliseeva | 3
22 May
(Kazakhstan) Aizhan Khojabekova | 2
(Ukraine) Maryna Malovana | 0
22 May
(China) Gao Meiling | 3
(Argentina) Florencia Juárez | 0
22 May
(Germany) Nomin Deutsch | 0
(India) Sonia Lather | 3
22 May
(Turkey) Satı Burcu | 1
(Poland) Aneta Rygielska | 2

Quarterfinals
24 May
(Italy) Alessia Mesiano | 2
(Russia) Viktoriia Kuleshova | 0
24 May
(Azerbaijan) Mahsati Hamzayeva | 0
(Bulgaria) Denitsa Eliseeva | 3
24 May
(Kazakhstan) Aizhan Khojabekova | 3
(China) Gao Meiling | 0
24 May
(India) Sonia Lather | 3
(Poland) Aneta Rygielska | 0

Semifinals
26 May
(Italy) Alessia Mesiano | 3
(Bulgaria) Denitsa Eliseeva | 0
26 May
(Kazakhstan) Aizhan Khojabekova | 0
(India) Sonia Lather | 3

Final
27 May
(Italy) Alessia Mesiano | 2
(India) Sonia Lather | 1
