= Boxing at the 2018 Commonwealth Games – Women's lightweight =

Boxing competitions

Boxing – Women's lightweight at the 2018 Commonwealth Games
- Venue: Oxenford Studios
- Dates: 7 – 14 April 2018
- Competitors: 10 from 10 nations

Medalists
gold medal	Anja Stridsman	Australia
silver medal	Paige Murney	England
bronze medal	Troy Garton	New Zealand
bronze medal	Yetunde Odunuga	Nigeria

The women's lightweight boxing competitions at the 2018 Commonwealth Games in Gold Coast, Australia took place between 7 and 14 April at Oxenford Studios. Women lightweights were limited to those boxers weighing less than 60 kilograms.

Like all Commonwealth boxing events, the competition was a straight single-elimination tournament. Both semifinal losers were awarded bronze medals, so no boxers competed again after their first loss. Bouts consisted of three rounds of three minutes each, with one-minute breaks between rounds. Beginning this year, the competition was scored using the "must-ten" scoring system.

== Schedule ==
The schedule is as follows:

All times are Australian Eastern Standard Time (UTC+10)

Date	Time	Round
Saturday 7 April 2018	20:32	Round of 16
Wednesday 11 April 2018	13:22	Quarter-finals
Friday 13 April 2018	15:02	Semi-finals
Saturday 14 April 2018	13:47	Final

== Results ==
The draw is as follows:

Round of 16
Kimberley Gittens (BAR)	0
Sarita Devi (IND)	5
Laizani Soma (PNG)	0
Paige Murney (ENG)	5

Quarterfinals
Anja Stridsman (AUS)	5
Sarita Devi (IND)	0
Aratwa Kasemang (BOT)	0
Troy Garton (NZL)	5
Caroline Veyre (CAN)
Yetunde Odunuga (NGR)	RSC
Paige Murney (ENG)	5
Alanna Nihell (NIR)	0

Semifinals
Anja Stridsman (AUS)	5
Troy Garton (NZL)	0
Yetunde Odunuga (NGR)	1
Paige Murney (ENG)	4

Final
Anja Stridsman (AUS)	5
Paige Murney (ENG)	0
