= 2014 AIBA Women's World Boxing Championships – Featherweight =

Boxing competitions

The Featherweight (57 kg) competition at the 2014 AIBA Women's World Boxing Championships was held from 16–24 November 2014.

== Medalists ==
Gold	Zinaida Dobrynina (RUS)
Silver	Nesthy Petecio (PHI)
Bronze	Tiara Brown (USA)
Bronze	Alessia Mesiano (ITA)

== Draw ==
=== Preliminaries ===
	Result	
Nesthy Petecio (Philippines)	3–0	(Sweden) Linnea Strandell

=== Top half ===
First Round
(Algeria) Manel Meharzi	0
(Philippines) Nesthy Petecio	3
(Ukraine) Maryna Malovana	2
(Argentina) Florencia Romero	1
(Mongolia) Ouyn Nergui	3
(Lithuania) Ana Starovoitova	0
(Republic of Ireland) Joanne Lambe	0
(China) Lu Qiong	3
(Chinese Taipei) Chen Wen-ling	3
(Hungary) Kornélia Nagy	0
(Sri Lanka) Keshani Kasthuri	3
(Indonesia) Christina Jembay	0
(Uganda) Dianah Atwiine
(Bulgaria) Svetlana Staneva	TKO
(United States) Tiara Brown	2
(Poland) Aneta Rygielska	1

Second Round
(Philippines) Nesthy Petecio	3
(Ukraine) Maryna Malovana	0
(Mongolia) Ouyn Nergui	0
(China) Lu Qiong	3
(Chinese Taipei) Chen Wen-ling	2
(Sri Lanka) Keshani Kasthuri	1
(Bulgaria) Svetlana Staneva	0
(United States) Tiara Brown	3

Quarterfinals
(Philippines) Nesthy Petecio	3
(China) Lu Qiong	0
(Chinese Taipei) Chen Wen-ling	1
(United States) Tiara Brown	2

Semifinals
(Philippines) Nesthy Petecio	3
(United States) Tiara Brown	0

=== Bottom half ===
First Round
(Italy) Alessia Mesiano	TKO
(Zambia) Jane Mulenga
(Morocco) Laila Marzaq	0
(Turkey) Satı Burcu	3
(Lesotho) Nthabeleng Mathaha
(Romania) Lăcrămioara Perijoc	TKO
(India) Pwilao Basumatary	3
(Costa Rica) Katherine Arauz	0
(Brazil) Taynna Santos	1
(Germany) Nina Meinke	2
(Thailand) Peamwilai Laopeam	0
(Russia) Zinaida Dobrynina	2
(Azerbaijan) Mahsati Hamzayeva	0
(Mexico) Melissa Esquivel	3
(South Korea) Oh Yeon-ji	3
(Kazakhstan) Oxana Koroleva	0

Second Round
(Italy) Alessia Mesiano	3
(Turkey) Satı Burcu	0
(Romania) Lăcrămioara Perijoc	3
(India) Pwilao Basumatary	0
(Germany) Nina Meinke	0
(Russia) Zinaida Dobrynina	3
(Mexico) Melissa Esquivel	0
(South Korea) Oh Yeon-ji	3

Quarterfinals
(Italy) Alessia Mesiano	2
(Romania) Lăcrămioara Perijoc	1
(Russia) Zinaida Dobrynina	2
(South Korea) Oh Yeon-ji	1

Semifinals
(Italy) Alessia Mesiano	1
(Russia) Zinaida Dobrynina	2

=== Final ===
Final
(Philippines) Nesthy Petecio	0
(Russia) Zinaida Dobrynina	2
