= Yetunde Odunuga =

Nigerian boxer (born 1997)

Personal information
- Nationality: Nigerian
- Born: 19 October 1997 (age 28) Nigeria
- Weight: Lightweight

Boxing career
Medal record
Women's amateur boxing
Representing Nigeria
Commonwealth Games
Bronze medal – third place	2018 Gold Coast	Lightweight

Yetunde Odunuga (born 19 November 1997) is a Nigerian amateur boxer who won a bronze medal at the 2018 Commonwealth Games.

== Career ==
Yetunde competed at the 2018 Commonwealth Games. She won a bronze medal in the middleweight event against Caroline Veyre.

In 2017, Yetunde Odunuga, a Nigerian Army officer, won gold in the women’s lightweight category in the African Amateur Boxing Championships, Brazzaville, Congo.
