= Esra Yıldız =

Turkish boxer (born 1997)

Personal information
- Other names: Esra Yıldız Kahraman
- Born: 4 July 1997 (age 29) Nevşehir, Turkey
- Height: 167 cm (5 ft 6 in)

Boxing career
- Weight class: Lightweight
Medal record
Women's amateur boxing
Representing Turkey
Olympic Games
Bronze medal – third place	2024 Paris	Featherweight
IBA World Championships
Bronze medal – third place	2025 Niš	Featherweight
EUBC European Championships
Bronze medal – third place	2016 Sofia	Lightweight
EB European Championships
Bronze medal – third place	2026 Sofia	57 kg

Esra Yıldız Kahraman (born 4 July 1997) is a Turkish amateur boxer who won a bronze medal in the lightweight divisions at the 2016 European Championships. She was named as a competitor for Turkey at the 2024 Summer Olympics.

2026 European Boxing Championships

== Personal life ==
Esra Yıldız was born in Nevşehir, Turkey on 4 July 1997. After completing her high school education at Altınyıldız College in Nevşehir in 2015, she entered Nevşehir Hacı Bektaş Veli University to study Physical Education and Sport, graduating in 2019.

== Amateur boxing career ==
Yıldız started boxing at Nevşehir Gençlik Sports Club in 2010. In 2012, she participated in Turkey's Championships held in Kayseri. She became champion in the 57 kg division, and was named the "Most Hyped Boxer" (Turkish: en dövüşken sporcu). Following her victory she was admitted to Turkey's national team.

She debuted internationally at the 2012 European Cadets and Juniors Boxing Championships in Władysławowo, Poland, and won the bronze medal n the -57 kg division. In June 2013, she took part at the VII EUBC European Union Women Elite Youth and Junior Boxing Championships 2013 in Keszthely, Hungary, and captured the gold medal in the junior 60 kg division. The same year, she took the silver medal in the junior 60 kg event at the AIBA Women's Junior/Youth World Boxing Championships held in Albena, Bulgaria.

Yıldız participated at the 2014 Summer Youth Olympics in Nanjing, China. She won the silver medal in the youth lightweight event at the 2014 AIBA Youth World Boxing Championships in Sofia in Bulgaria. She took part at the 2016 AIBA Women's World Boxing Championships in Astana, Kazakhstan. At the 2016 EUBC Women's Boxing Championships in Sofia, Bulgaria, she won the bronze medal. She competed in the featherweight (54–57 kg) division at the 2018 AIBA Women's World Boxing Championships in New Delhi, India. In 2019, she was a finalist at the Balkan Boxing Championships. Yıldız won the bronze medal at the 2020 European Boxing Olympic Qualification Tournament in London. She was named as a competitor for the 2020 Summer Olympics.

Yıldız is a member of Fenerbahçe Boxing, where she is coached by Nedim Baba.

== 2024 Summer Olympics controversy ==
In 2024, Yildiz, representing Turkey in the women's featherweight (57 kg) boxing competition at the 2024 Summer Olympics in Paris, lost to Lin Yu-ting of Taiwan (Republic of China) with a score of 0:5 in the semifinals, securing a bronze medal. After the match, Kahraman sparked controversy by making an X gesture with her index finger. This gesture was likely related to a previous incident where Lin had been stripped of a bronze medal at a championship organized by the Russian-led International Boxing Association (IBA) due to alleged testing irregularities. The controversy occurred during ongoing debates about gender eligibility in boxing though the IBA did not disclose the testing methodology, stating that the "specifics remain confidential".

The Washington Post reported that the specifics of the failed tests for both Lin Yu-ting and another boxer, Imane Khelif, remained unclear. In June 2023, the IBA's Olympic status was revoked due to governance issues and perceived judging and refereeing corruption.

The International Olympic Committee (IOC) and its Paris Boxing Unit had previously criticized similar disqualifications as "sudden and arbitrary" and taken "without any due process".
