= Fatima Zahra =

Pakistani amateur boxer (born 2004)

Personal information
- Born: 2 July 2004 (age 22) Sargodha, Punjab, Pakistan
- Height: 1.7 m (5 ft 7 in)

Sport
- Sport: Amateur boxing
- Weight class: 60 kg
Medal record
Women's amateur boxing
Representing Pakistan
Commonwealth Games
Bronze medal – third place	2026 Glasgow	60 kg
Islamic Solidarity Games
Bronze medal – third place	2025 Riyadh	60 kg

Fatima Zahra (born 2 July 2004) is a Pakistani amateur boxer. She has won bronze medals at the 2026 Commonwealth Games and the 2025 Islamic Solidarity Games.

== Early life ==
Fatima was born on 2 July 2004 in Sargodha, Punjab, Pakistan. She took up boxing after being inspired by Indian Olympic medalist boxer Mary Kom and the biographical film based on her life. Her family initially opposed her boxing career and prevented her from attending training. After being persuaded by her childhood coach, they became supportive of her boxing career. Her two sisters and younger brother are also involved in the sport.

== Career ==
Fatima's international breakthrough came at the 2022 Asian Games in Hangzhou, where she was Pakistan's only female boxer at the tournament.

At the 2025 Islamic Solidarity Games in Riyadh, she competed in the 60 kg. She defeated Algeria's Hamda Melissa (5–0) in the quarterfinals and was then narrowly beaten (3–2) by Odinakhon Ismoilova of Uzbekistan in the semifinals to win the bronze medal, becoming the first Pakistani woman to claim an international multi-sport boxing medal.

At the 2026 Commonwealth Games in Glasgow, she was Pakistan's baton bearer at the opening ceremony. In the 60 kg event, she defeated Lesotho's Realboha Segoeta in the opening round via RSC and New Zealand's Jordan Wilson (5–0) in the quarterfinals. She was then defeated in the semifinals by Canada's Marie Al-Ahmadieh via RSC, finishing with the bronze medal. She became Pakistan's first female Commonwealth Games medalist and the first Pakistani woman to win a boxing medal at the Commonwealth Games. She also served as the country's flag bearer at the closing ceremony. At the 2026 Asian Games in Nagoya, she lost 5–0 to Tajikistan's Mijgona Samadova in the Round of 16 of the 60 kg event.
