= Boxing at the 2019 Pan American Games – Women's 60 kg =

Women's Lightweight at the 2019 Pan American Games
- Venue: Miguel Grau Coliseum
- Dates: July 29 – August 2, 2019
- Competitors: 8 from 8 nations

Medalists
Gold medal	Beatriz Ferreira	Brazil
Silver medal	Dayana Sánchez	Argentina
Bronze medal	Rashida Ellis	United States
Bronze medal	Esmeralda Falcón	Mexico

The Women's lightweight competition of the boxing events at the 2019 Pan American Games in Lima, Peru, was held between the 29 of July and the 2 of August 2019 at the Miguel Grau Coliseum.

Like all Pan American boxing events, the competition is a straight single-elimination tournament. Both semifinal losers are awarded bronze medals, so no boxers compete again after their first loss. Bouts consist of a 3 rounds "10-point must" scoring system used in the pro game, where the winner of each round must be awarded 10 points and the loser a lesser amount, and the elimination of the padded headgear. Five judges scored each bout. The winner will be the boxer who scored the most at the end of the match.

== Results ==
=== Bracket ===
Quarterfinals; July 29, 2019
Beatriz Ferreira (BRA)	5
Esperanza Míñope (PER)	0
Krisandy Rios (VEN)	2
Rashida Ellis (USA)	3
Esmeralda Falcón (MEX)	5
Scarleth Ojeda (NCA)	0
Irene Fiolek (CAN)	2
Dayana Sánchez (ARG)	3

Semifinals; July 30, 2019
Beatriz Ferreira (BRA)	3
Rashida Ellis (USA)	2
Esmeralda Falcón (MEX)	1
Dayana Sánchez (ARG)	4

Final; August 2, 2019
Beatriz Ferreira (BRA)	5
Dayana Sánchez (ARG)	0
