= Boxing at the 2026 Commonwealth Games – Women's 60 kg =

Boxing competitions

Boxing – Women's 60 kg at the 2026 Commonwealth Games
- Venue: SEC Centre
- Dates: July 24 – 1 August 2026
- Competitors: 10 from 10 nations

Medalists
gold medal	Priya Ghanghas	India
silver medal	Marie Al-Ahmadieh	Canada
bronze medal	Fatima Zahra	Pakistan
bronze medal	Lucy Kings-Wheatley	England

The Women's 60 kg boxing competitions at the 2026 Commonwealth Games in Glasgow, Scotland took place between July 24 and August 1 at the SEC Centre.

Like all Commonwealth boxing events, the competition was a straight single-elimination tournament. Both semifinal losers were awarded bronze medals, so no boxers competed again after their first loss. Bouts consisted of three rounds of three minutes each, with one-minute breaks between rounds.

== Schedule ==
The schedule was as follows:

Date	Round
Friday 24 July	Preliminaries
Tuesday 28 July	Quarter-finals
Friday 31 July	Semi-finals
Saturday 1 August	Final

== Results ==
The draw was as follows:

=== Bracket ===
Round of 16
24 July
Fatima Zahra (PAK)	RSC
Realeboha Segoete (LES)
24 July
Lucy Kings-Wheatley (ENG)	5
Petronella Nokenoke (PNG)	0

Quarterfinals
28 July
Jordan Wilson (NZL)	0
Fatima Zahra (PAK)	5
28 July
Rosemarion Otieno (KEN)	1
Marie Al-Ahmadieh (CAN)	4
28 July
Priya Ghanghas (IND)	4
Niamh Mitchell (SCO)	1
28 July
Josefien Betist (SLE)	2
Lucy Kings-Wheatley (ENG)	3

Semifinal
31 July
Fatima Zahra (PAK)	0
Marie Al-Ahmadieh (CAN)	RSC
31 July
Priya Ghanghas (IND)	5
Lucy Kings-Wheatley (ENG)	0

Gold medal match
1 August
Marie Al-Ahmadieh (CAN)	1
Priya Ghanghas (IND)	4
