= Marie Al-Ahmadieh =

Canadian boxer (born 2004)

Marie-Bathoul Al-Ahmadieh
Personal information
- Born: 16 October 2004 (age 22) Montreal, Quebec, Canada
- Weight: 60 kg (132 lb)

Boxing career
- Sport: Amateur boxing
- Weight class: 60 kg
- Retired: 2
Medal record
Women's amateur boxing
Representing Canada
Commonwealth Games
Silver medal – second place	2026 Glasgow	Women's 60 kg

Marie-Bathoul Al-Ahmadieh (born October 16, 2004) is a Canadian amateur boxer who won a silver medal at the 2026 Commonwealth Games.

== Career ==
Al-Ahmadieh first represented Canada at a major event, at the 2023 Pan American Games in Santiago, Chile. In the 2024 season, Al-Ahmadieh aimed to qualify for the 2024 Summer Olympics, but had to withdraw from the final qualifier due to health reasons.

In 2026 Al-Ahmadieh was named to Canada's 2026 Commonwealth Games team alongside her brother Keoma. At the games, Al-Ahmadieh would win the silver medal.
