= Paige Murney =

English boxer (born 1995)

Personal information
- Born: 21 January 1995 (age 31) Leicester, England
- Height: 171 cm (5 ft 7 in)
- Weight: Lightweight

Boxing career
- Stance: Orthodox

Boxing record
- Total fights: 5
- Wins: 5
Medal record
Women's amateur boxing
Representing England
Commonwealth Games
Silver medal – second place	2018 Gold Coast	Lightweight
European Union Championships
Bronze medal – third place	2017 Cascia	Light welterweight

Paige Murney (born 21 January 1995) is an English professional boxer. As an amateur, she won a silver medal in the lightweight division at the 2018 Commonwealth Games.

== Amateur career ==
Murney fought out of Leicester Unity Boxing Club. She won a bronze medal at the 2017 European Union Championships.

Representing England, she won a silver medal at the 2018 Commonwealth Games in Australia losing out in the lightweight final to Anja Stridsman of the host nation.

She competed at the 2019 World Championships in Russia where she lost by unanimous decision to Kazakhstan's Rimma Volossenko in the round of 32.

== Professional career ==
In May 2021, Murney turned professional, signing a promotional deal with Dave Coldwell, before making her pro-debut on 12 December that year at Leicester Arena defeating Karina Szmalenberg on points.

An ACL injury which required surgery kept her out of the competitive boxing ring for more than two and a half years from 2 March 2024 until 3 October 2026 when she returned with a points win over Linzi Buczynskyj in a four-round contest at Utilita Arena in Birmingham.

== Professional boxing record ==
5 fights	5 wins	0 losses
By decision	5	0

No.	Result	Record	Opponent	Type	Round, time	Date	Location	Notes
5	Win	5–0	Linzi Buczynskyj	PTS	4	3 Oct 2026	Utilita Arena, Birmingham, England	
4	Win	4–0	Lenka Volejnikova	PTS	6	2 Mar 2024	Leicester Arena, Leicester, England	
3	Win	3–0	Vaida Masiokaite	PTS	6	1 Oct 2023	Athena, Leicester, England	
2	Win	2–0	Halanna Dos Santos	PTS	6	12 May 2023	Maher Centre, Leicester, England	
1	Win	1–0	Karina Szmalenberg	PTS	6	12 Dec 2021	Leicester Arena, Leicester, England	
