= Amy Andrew =

New Zealand boxer (born 1986)

Personal information
- Nationality: New Zealand
- Born: 28 January 1986 (age 40) Belfast, Northern Ireland
- Height: 170 cm (5 ft 7 in)
- Weight: Featherweight

Boxing career
- Stance: Orthodox

Boxing record
- Total fights: 9
- Wins: 9

Amy Andrew (born 28 January 1986) is a New Zealand professional boxer who is a former Commonwealth female featherweight champion.

== Amateur career ==
While working as a journalist for MailOnline, Andrew was inspired to take up boxing after attending the London 2012 Olympics.

She trained at Haringey Gym in London and went on to have an amateur career which included representing New Zealand, the country of her mother's birth, at the Women's World Boxing Championships in New Delhi, India, where she beat Algeria's Khelif Hedjila in her first bout before losing in the round-of-32 to future professional world champion Skye Nicolson from Australia.

Andrew also won the England Boxing National Amateur Championships elite female featherweight title in 2019, defeating number one seed Raven Chapman by unanimous decision in the final held in Manchester.

== Professional career ==
Andrew turned professional in 2021 and made her pro-debut on 21 August that year at York Hall in London where she beat Estonia's Polina Golubeva on points in a six-round contest.

She claimed the vacant Commonwealth female featherweight title with a unanimous decision win over Linzi Buczynskyj on 27 April 2024, in a bout held at Brentwood Centre in Essex.

Andrew is scheduled to face undefeated Shona Whitwell for the vacant WBO European female featherweight title at York Hall in London on 6 December 2026.

== Personal life ==
Andrew is married to fellow professional boxer Numan Hussain.

== Professional boxing record ==
9 fights	9 wins	0 losses
By decision	9	0

No.	Result	Record	Opponent	Type	Round, time	Date	Location	Notes
9	Win	9–0	Eva Cantos	UD	8	23 May 2026	Rival Boxing Gym, Marbella, Spain	
8	Win	8–0	Kira Carter	PTS	6	13 December 2025	Sir James Hawkey Hall, Woodford Green, England	
7	Win	7–0	Linzi Buczynskyj	UD	10	27 April 2024	Brentwood Centre, Brentwood, Essex, England	Won vacant Commonwealth female featherweight title
6	Win	6–0	Vaida Masiokaite	PTS	6	10 February 2024	Brentwood Centre, Brentwood, England	
5	Win	5–0	Angelika Oles	PTS	8	13 October 2023	Corn Exchange, Bedford, England	
4	Win	4–0	Wendellin Cruz	PTS	6	10 June 2023	Planet Ice, Solihull, England	
3	Win	3–0	Cristina Bunsuioc	PTS	4	28 April 2023	York Hall, London, England	
2	Win	2–0	Vanesa Caballero	PTS	6	14 October 2021	Roma, Lazio, Italy	
1	Win	1–0	Polina Golubeva	PTS	6	21 August 2021	York Hall, London, England	
