= Rebecca Nicoli =

Italian boxer (born 1999)

Personal information
- Nationality: Italian
- Born: 29 September 1999 (age 26) Milan, Italy

Sport
- Sport: Boxing
Medal record
Women's amateur boxing
Representing Italy
Mediterranean Games
Bronze medal – third place	2022 Oran	Lightweight

Rebecca Nicoli (born 29 September 1999) is an Italian boxer. She competed in the women's lightweight event at the 2020 Summer Olympics.
