= Ornella Wahner =

German boxer (born 1993)

Personal information
- Nationality: German
- Born: 19 February 1993 (age 33) Dresden, Germany
- Height: 5 ft 4 1/2 in (164 cm)
- Weight: Featherweight

Boxing career
Medal record
Women's amateur boxing
Representing Germany
World Championships
Gold medal – first place	2018 New Delhi	Featherweight
Youth World Championships
Gold medal – first place	2011 Antalya	Featherweight
EU Championships
Silver medal – second place	2013 Keszthely	Featherweight

Ornella Wahner (born 19 February 1993) is a German amateur boxer who won gold medals at the 2011 Youth and Junior World Championships and the 2018 World Championships, defeating Sonia Chahal 4–1 in the final to become the first German amateur world champion boxer. She is coached by Michael Timm.
