= Karina Ibragimova =

Kazakh boxer (born 1996)

Personal information
- Born: 8 July 1996 (age 29) Krasnyi Yar
- Height: 175 cm (5 ft 9 in)

Boxing career
- Weight class: Light-welterweight
Medal record
Women's amateur boxing
Representing Kazakhstan
World Championships
Silver medal – second place	2023 New Delhi	Featherweight
Bronze medal – third place	2018 New Delhi	Lightweight
Bronze medal – third place	2022 Istanbul	Featherweight
Asian Games
Silver medal – second place	2022 Hangzhou	Featherweight
Asian Championships
Gold medal – first place	2022 Amman	Featherweight

Karina Ibragimova (born 8 July 1996) is a Kazakh amateur boxer. She won the silver medal at the 2022 Asian Games.

== Amateur career ==
Ibragimova is a multiple-time medalist at the national championship in the weight category up to 60 kg.

In November 2018, she won a bronze medal in the up to 60 kg weight category at the 10th Women's World Boxing Championship in India, where in the semifinal match she faced the experienced Irish boxer Kellie Anne Harrington and lost to her with a score of 0:5, ending her performance at the world championship.

In October 2023, Ibragimova became a silver medalist at the Asian Games in Hangzhou (China) in the up to 57 kg, weight category and secured a spot for the 2024 Olympic Games. In the quarterfinals, she defeated Mongolian representative Namuun Monkhor by unanimous decision (5:0), then in the semifinals, she defeated Tajik boxer Mijgona Samadova by split decision (3:2), but in the final, she lost to the experienced Taiwanese representative Lin Yu-Ting by unanimous decision with a score of 0:5.

She competed at in the women's 57 kg event at the 2024 Olympics.
