= Esmeralda Falcón =

Mexican boxer (born 1995)

Personal information
- Born: Esmeralda Falcón Reyes; 10 January 1995 (age 31) Mexico City, Mexico

Boxing career
Medal record
Women's amateur boxing
Representing Mexico
Pan American Games
Bronze medal – third place	2019 Lima	Lightweight
Central American and Caribbean Games
Gold medal – first place	2018 Barranquilla	Lightweight

Esmeralda Falcón Reyes (born 10 January 1995), nicknamed La Pantera, is a Mexican boxer. She is the first woman from her country to compete in that discipline in the Olympic Games.

== Personal life ==
Falcón was born in the Iztapalapa borough of Mexico City. Along with her sporting career, she is pursuing a degree in physical education.

== Career ==
At the 2018 Central American and Caribbean Games, Falcón defeated Elisa Williams of Panama in the 60 kilogram division, winning a gold medal. At the 2019 Pan American Games, she won the bronze medal after defeating Scarleth Ojeda of Nicaragua.

For the Tokyo 2020 Olympic Games qualification, Falcón trained at home due to the COVID-19 pandemic. The elimination for the Olympic competition would have been held in Buenos Aires from 23 March to 3 April, but it was cancelled due to the health emergency. On 12 May 2021, the Mexican Boxing Federation announced its selection for the Olympic fair by the Boxing Task Force, becoming the first Mexican woman to compete in boxing in her country's Olympic history.
