= Boxing at the 2015 Pan American Games – Women's lightweight =

Women's lightweight at the 2015 Pan American Games
- Venue: Oshawa Sports Centre
- Dates: July 20–25
- Competitors: 8 from 8 nations

Medalists
| Gold medal | Caroline Veyre | Canada |
| Silver medal | Dayana Sánchez | Argentina |
| Bronze medal | Victoria Torres | Mexico |
| Bronze medal | Mirquin Sena | Dominican Republic |

The women's lightweight competition of the boxing events at the 2015 Pan American Games in Toronto, Ontario, Canada, was held between the 20 and 25 of July at the Oshawa Sports Centre. The defending champion is Kiria Tapia of Puerto Rico. Lightweights is limited to those boxers weighing less than or equal to 60 kilograms.

Like all Pan American boxing events, the competition is a straight single-elimination tournament. Both semifinal losers are awarded bronze medals, so no boxers compete again after their first loss. Bouts consist of a 3 rounds "10-point must" scoring system used in the pro game, where the winner of each round must be awarded 10 points and the loser a lesser amount. AIBA officials are waiting to see how things go in the men's game before making a decision to take headgear off women fighters. Five judges scored each bout. The winner will be the boxer who scored the most at the end of the match.

== Results ==
=== Bracket ===
Quarterfinals; July 20, 2015
Victoria Torres (MEX) | 3
Valerian Spicer (DMA) | 0
Dayana Sánchez (ARG) | 3
Stefani Lopez (PER) | 0
Mirquin Sena (DOM) | 2
Karla Herrera (ESA) | 1
Kiria Tapia (PUR) | 1
Caroline Veyre (CAN) | 2

Semifinals; July 21, 2015
Victoria Torres (MEX) | 0
Dayana Sánchez (ARG) | 3
Mirquin Sena (DOM) | 0
Caroline Veyre (CAN) | 2

Finals; July 25, 2015
Dayana Sánchez (ARG) | 0
Caroline Veyre (CAN) | 2
