= Boxing at the 2022 Mediterranean Games – Women's lightweight =

Boxing competitions

Women's lightweight at the 2022 Mediterranean Games
- Venue: EMEC Hall
- Date: 28 June – 1 July
- Competitors: 7 from 7 nations

Medalists
gold medal	Hadjila Khelif	Algeria
silver medal	Chaymae Rhaddi	Morocco
bronze medal	Amina Zidani	France
bronze medal	Rebecca Nicoli	Italy

The women's lightweight competition of the boxing events at the 2022 Mediterranean Games in Oran, Algeria, was held from 28 June to 1 July at the EMEC Hall.

Like all Mediterranean Games boxing events, the competition was a straight single-elimination tournament. Both semifinal losers were awarded bronze medals, so no boxers competed again after their first loss.

== Results ==
Quarterfinals
Mariam Hussein (EGY)
Amina Zidani (FRA)	ABD
Olga Papadatou (GRE)	0
Rebecca Nicoli (ITA)	3
Chaymae Rhaddi (MAR)	2
Mariem Homrani (TUN)	1

Semifinals
Hadjila Khelif (ALG)	3
Amina Zidani (FRA)	0
Rebecca Nicoli (ITA)	1
Chaymae Rhaddi (MAR)	2

Final
Hadjila Khelif (ALG)	2
Chaymae Rhaddi (MAR)	0
