= Nesthy Petecio =

Filipino boxer (born 1992)

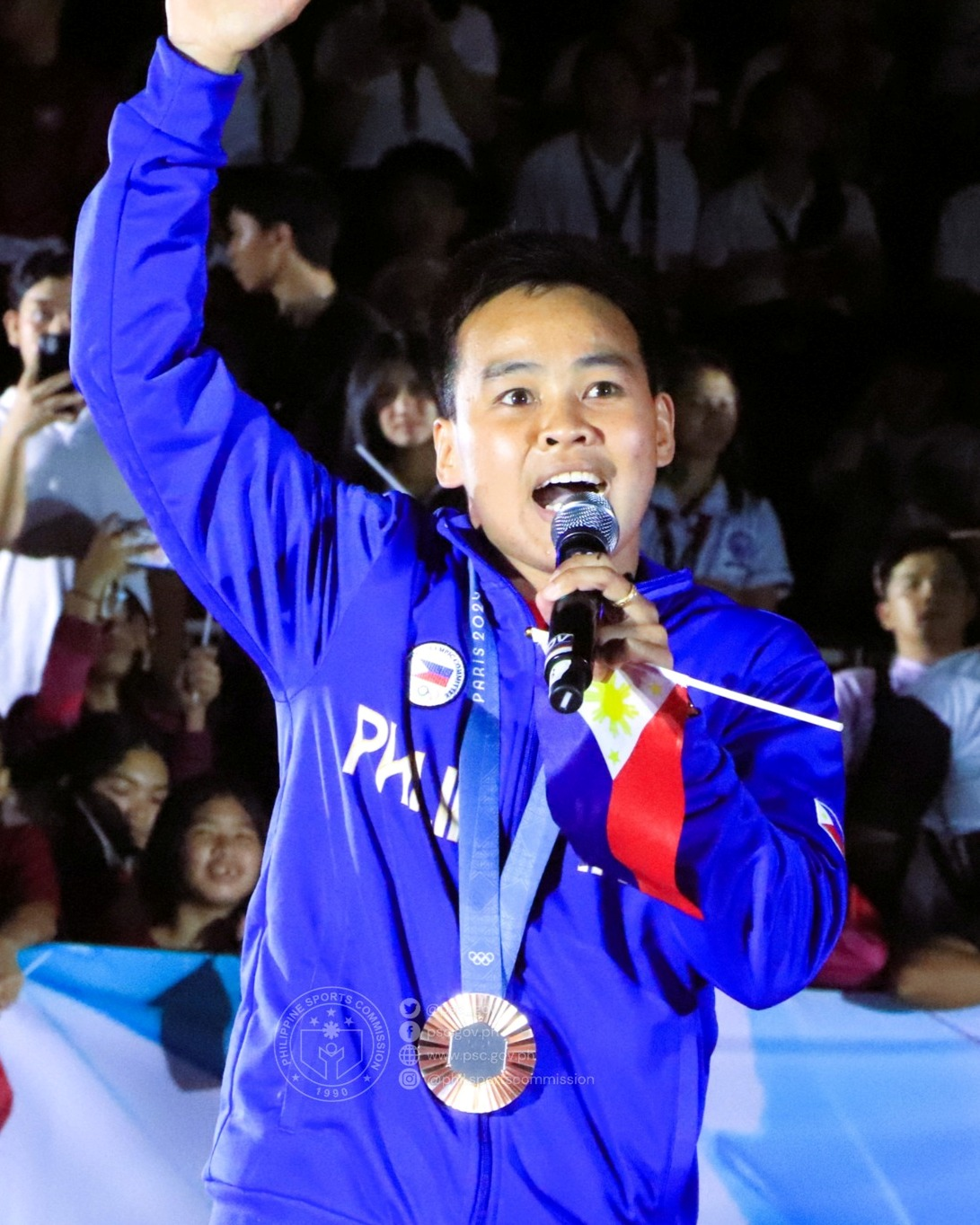
- Petecio in 2024

Personal information
- Nationality: Filipino
- Born: Nesthy Alcayde Petecio; April 11, 1992 (age 34) Santa Cruz, Davao del Sur, Philippines
- Height: 1.58 m (5 ft 2 in)
- Military career
- Allegiance: Philippines
- Branch: Philippine Coast Guard
- Service years: 2024–present
- Unit: Petty Officer

Boxing career
- Weight class: Featherweight
Medal record
Women's boxing
Representing the Philippines
Event	1st	2nd	3rd
Summer Olympic Games	0	1	1
World Championships	1	1	0
Asian Championships	0	1	2
Southeast Asian Games	2	3	2
Total	3	6	5
Olympic Games
Silver medal – second place	2020 Tokyo	Featherweight
Bronze medal – third place	2024 Paris	Featherweight
World Championships
Gold medal – first place	2019 Ulan-Ude	Featherweight
Silver medal – second place	2014 Jeju City	Featherweight
Asian Championships
Silver medal – second place	2015 Wulanchabu	Bantamweight
Bronze medal – third place	2012 Ulaanbaatar	Bantamweight
Bronze medal – third place	2022 Amman	Featherweight
Southeast Asian Games
Gold medal – first place	2019 Philippines	Featherweight
Gold medal – first place	2023 Cambodia	Featherweight
Silver medal – second place	2011 Jakarta	Bantamweight
Silver medal – second place	2013 Naypyidaw	Featherweight
Silver medal – second place	2015 Singapore	Featherweight
Bronze medal – third place	2021 Vietnam	Lightweight
Bronze medal – third place	2025 Thailand	Light welterweight

Nesthy Alcayde Petecio (born April 11, 1992) is a Filipino amateur boxer. She won a silver medal in the inaugural women's featherweight event at the 2020 Summer Olympics, becoming the first Filipino woman to win an Olympic medal in boxing, and won a bronze medal in the women's flyweight event at the 2024 Summer Olympics. She also won a silver medal at the 2014 World Championships and gold at the 2019 edition.

With two Olympic medals, Petecio is the first Filipino boxer to win multiple medals in the Olympic Games.

== Early life and education ==
Petecio was born in Santa Cruz, Davao del Sur to parents Teodoro Petecio and Prescilla Alcayde. Petecio came from a poor family; her father was a farmer while her mother is a housewife. At a young age, Petecio and her siblings had to aid their parents in the farm to earn a living. She recalled selling manure as fertilizer just to earn money. According to Petecio, boxing paved the way for her to attend Rizal Technological University for higher education despite financial problems, and she considers it her "way out of poverty." In 2019, she graduated with an associate degree from the University of Baguio's School of International Hospitality and Tourism Management.

== Amateur career ==
=== Early years ===
Petecio and her siblings were taught boxing as a means of self-defense. Petecio and her siblings went on to join inter-barangay boxing competitions to help their family financially.

Petecio had a big break in her boxing career at age 11, when she joined a boxing match at the Araw ng Davao in Rizal Park, Davao City. Although competitions were usually arranged by gender, Petecio's opponent was male with a bigger build and more experience than herself. However she was able to win the match, which drew the attention of Celestino Rebamonte who in turn endorsed her to the Philippine women's team coach Roel Velasco. She was then able to compete at the 2007 Smart National Youth and Women’s Open Boxing Championships in Cagayan de Oro where she won gold. As a result she earned her a berth in the national boxing team.

=== National team ===
Representing the Philippines, Petecio went on to compete in several international competitions. She clinched silver medals at the 2014 AIBA Women's World Championships and the 2011 and 2013 Southeast Asian Games; a bronze medal in the 2012 Asian Championships; and a gold medal in the 2015 Indonesia President’s Cup

She would also compete in the 2014 Asian Games in Incheon, South Korea, the 2015 and 2017 Asian Championships but fail to make a podium finish. She also failed to qualify for the 2016 Summer Olympics in Rio de Janeiro, Brazil. Failing to medal at the 2018 Asian Games in Jakarta, Indonesia and dealing with the aftermath of ending a relationship with a girlfriend, Petecio experienced a bout of depression.

After a break, Petecio made a comeback by winning a gold at the 2019 Thailand Open International Boxing Championship. At the 2019 AIBA Women's World Boxing Championships in Ulan-Ude, Petecio won gold in the featherweight division after defeating hometown bet Liudmila Vorontsova in the final. She ended the year with another gold medal, this time at the 2019 Southeast Asian Games. It was a sweet victory for Petecio after failing to bring home the top prize in the biennial meet in her three previous attempts.

Petecio was able to qualify for the 2020 Summer Olympics in Tokyo, Japan due to her high ranking, after the world qualifiers was cancelled due to the COVID-19 pandemic. Competing in the women's featherweight event, Petecio's first fight was a 5:0 victory against Marcelat Sakobi Matshu of the Democratic Republic of Congo. In her next bout Petecio defeated Lin Yu-ting of Chinese Taipei (3:2) to advance to the quarterfinals, where she defeated Yeni Arias of Columbia (5:0) to secure at least a bronze medal and become the first woman to win a medal in Olympic boxing. She then defeated Irma Testa of Italy (4:1) in the semifinals to secure her place in the gold medal bout. Facing her amateur rival Sena Irie in the final, Petecio lost by unanimous decision (0:5) to take home the silver medal, the first Olympic boxing medal won by a Filipino boxer in 25 years.

=== Results ===
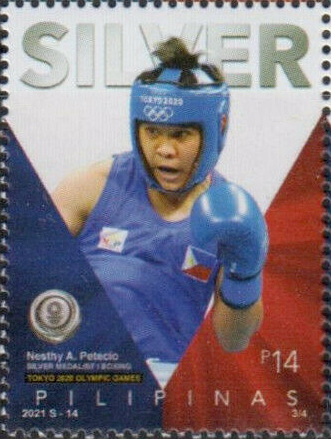
Petecio on a 2021 stamp of the Philippines

2014 Asian Games results

- Defeated Gulzhaina Ubbiniyazova (Kazakhstan) PTS (3–0)
- Loss to Yin Junhua (China) PTS (0–3)

2015 World Championships results

- Defeated Manel Meharzi (Algeria) PTS (3–0)
- Defeated Maryna Malovana (Ukraine) PTS (3–0)
- Defeated Lu Qiong (China) PTS (3–0)
- Defeated Tiara Brown (United States) PTS (3–0)
- Lost to Zinaida Dobrynina (Russia) PTS (0–2)

2019 World Championships results

- Defeated Jucielen Romeu (Brazil) PTS (3–2)
- Defeated Stanimira Petrova (Bulgaria) PTS (3–2)
- Defeated Qiao Jieru (China) PTS (3–2)
- Defeated Sena Irie (Japan) PTS (4–1)
- Defeated Karriss Artingstall (England) PTS (4–1)
- Defeated Liudmila Vorontsova (Russia) PTS (3–2)

2020 Summer Olympics results

- Defeated Marcelat Sakobi Matshu (Congo) PTS (5–0)
- Defeated Lin Yu-ting (Chinese-Taipei) PTS (3–2)
- Defeated Yeni Arias (Colombia) PTS (5–0)
- Defeated Irma Testa (Italy) PTS (4–1)
- Lost to Sena Irie (Japan) PTS (5–0) (claim silver medal)

2024 Summer Olympics results

- Defeated Jaismine Lamboria (India) PTS (5–0)
- Defeated Amina Zidani (France) PTS (4–1)
- Defeated Xu Zichun (China) PTS (5-0)
- Lost to Julia Szeremeta (Poland) MD (4-1) (claim bronze medal)

== Personal life ==
Petecio is openly lesbian. She dedicated her Olympic silver medal to the LGBTQ community.

In August 2024, the Philippine Coast Guard's Ronnie Gil Gavan announced that after claiming her bronze medal, petty officer second class Petecio will be promoted to petty officer first class.

== In popular media ==
In 2020, actress Jane De Leon portrayed Petecio's life story in Maalaala Mo Kaya's episode entitled "Medal" which was aired last January 18, 2020.

In 2021, Petecio made a virtual appearance in Pinoy Big Brother: Kumunity Season 10 when she gave a message to the celebrity housemates, and declaring the Pinoy Big Brother Games 2021 open.

Olympic Games
Preceded by Asa Miller	Flagbearer for Philippines (with Carlo Paalam); Paris 2024	Succeeded by Francis Ceccarelli; Tallulah Proulx
