= Svetlana Staneva =

Bulgarian boxer (born 1990)

Personal information
- Native name: Светлана Каменова Станева
- Full name: Svetlana Kamenova Staneva
- Born: 26 June 1990 (age 36) Dobrich, Bulgaria

Sport
- Country: Bulgaria
- Sport: Boxing
- Weight class: 57 kg
Medal record
Women's boxing
Representing Bulgaria
World Championships
| Bronze medal – third place | 2023 New Delhi | Featherweight |
European Games
| Silver medal – second place | 2023 Kraków-Małopolska | Featherweight |
European Championships
| Gold medal – first place | 2024 Belgrade | Featherweight |
| Silver medal – second place | 2014 Bucharest | Featherweight |
| Silver medal – second place | 2022 Budva | Featherweight |

Svetlana Kamenova Staneva (Bulgarian: Светлана Каменова Станева; born 26 June 1990) is a Bulgarian boxer competing in the featherweight (57 kg) division. She won the silver medal in the women's featherweight event at the 2023 European Games held in Poland. She won the gold medal in her event at the 2024 European Amateur Boxing Championships held in Belgrade, Serbia. Staneva represented Bulgaria at the 2024 Summer Olympics in Paris, France.

== Career ==
In 2012, Staneva competed at the AIBA Women's World Boxing Championships held in Qinhuangdao, China. She won the silver medal in the featherweight event at the 2014 Women's European Amateur Boxing Championships held in Bucharest, Romania. Staneva competed in the featherweight event at the 2014 AIBA Women's World Boxing Championships held in Jeju City, South Korea. She was eliminated in her second match.

Staneva competed at the 2016 European Boxing Olympic Qualification Tournament hoping to qualify for the 2016 Summer Olympics in Rio de Janeiro, Brazil. A month later, she competed in the lightweight event at the 2016 AIBA Women's World Boxing Championships held in Astana, Kazakhstan where she was eliminated in her first match.

Staneva won the silver medal in the featherweight event at the 2022 Women's European Amateur Boxing Championships held in Budva, Montenegro. She won one of the bronze medals in the featherweight event at the 2023 IBA Women's World Boxing Championships held in New Delhi, India. At first, she did not win a medal but she was awarded a bronze medal after Lin Yu-ting of Chinese Taipei was disqualified.

Staneva won the silver medal in the women's featherweight event at the 2023 European Games held in Poland. As a result, she secured a quota place for the 2024 Summer Olympics in Paris, France. In the final, she lost against Amina Zidani of France.

In April 2024, she won the gold medal in her event at the European Amateur Boxing Championships held in Belgrade, Serbia. She defeated Daria Abramova of Russia in her gold medal match. In August 2024, she competed in the women's 57 kg event at the 2024 Summer Olympics held in Paris, France. She was eliminated in her second match by Lin Yu-ting of Chinese Taipei, after getting defeated by her two years earlier in a nullified match; Staneva fuelled the controversy surrounding Lin by making an X gesture after the match.
