= Yamileth Solórzano =

Salvadoran boxer (born 1988)

Personal information
- Born: 29 May 1988 (age 36); San Salvador, El Salvador

Sport
- Sport: Boxing

Yamileth Solórzano (born 29 May 1988) is a Salvadoran boxer. She competed in the women's featherweight event at the 2020 Summer Olympics. She was defeated in the Round of 32 by Japanese boxer Sena Irie.
