= Priya Ghanghas =

Indian boxer

Personal information
- Nationality: Indian
- Born: 3 October 2005 (age 21) Bhiwani district, Haryana, India
- Height: 168 cm (5 ft 6 in) (2026)

Sport
- Sport: Boxing
- Weight class: 60 kg
Medal record
Women's boxing
Representing India
Commonwealth Games
Gold medal – first place	2026 Glasgow	60 kg
Asian Boxing Elite Championships
Gold medal – first place	2026 Ulaanbaatar	60 kg
Asian U22 Boxing Championships
Silver medal – second place	2025 Bangkok	60 kg

Priya Ghanghas (born 3 October 2005) is an Indian boxer who competes in the women's 60 kg weight category. She won the gold medal at the 2026 Asian Boxing Elite Championships in Ulaanbaatar. She won the gold medal in the women's 60 kg event at the 2026 Commonwealth Games in Glasgow.

== Early life ==
Priya Ghanghas hails from Bhiwani district of Haryana. She started boxing at the age of 11 in 2015, and she and her elder brother Neeraj Ghanghas, were initially trained by Ravi Sangwan at Charkhi Dadri. In 2022, she secured admission to the Boxing Academy at the Sports Authority of India Centre at Bhiwani.

== Career ==
Priya Ghanghas won the gold medal in the 57 kg category at the 6th Youth Women's National Boxing Championship held in Bhopal in 2023. In the 8th Elite Women's National Boxing Championship 2025 held in Noida, she won the silver medal in the 57 kg category after losing to Jaismine Lamboria in the finals. In the 2025 Asian U-22 Boxing Championships in Bangkok, she won the silver medal in the 60 kg weight category, after losing to China's Yu Tian in the final.

In the 2026 Asian Elite Boxing Championships held in Ulaanbaatar, Priya Ganghas defeated the 2023 World Championships gold-medalist Yang Chengyu of China in the quarterfinals and Mongolia's Namuun Monkhor in the semifinal. In the final, she defeated North Korea's Won Un-gyong to win the gold medal, and qualified for the 2026 Commonwealth Games and the 2026 Asian Games.

At the Commonwealth Games in Glasgow, she competed in the women's 60 kg event. She defeated Scotland's Niamh Mitchell in the quarter-finals to progress to the semi-finals. In the semi-finals, she defeated Lucy Kings-Wheatley of England to progress to the finals. In the finals, she defeated Marie Al-Ahmadieh of Canada to win the gold medal.
