= Amina Zidani =

French boxer (born 1993)

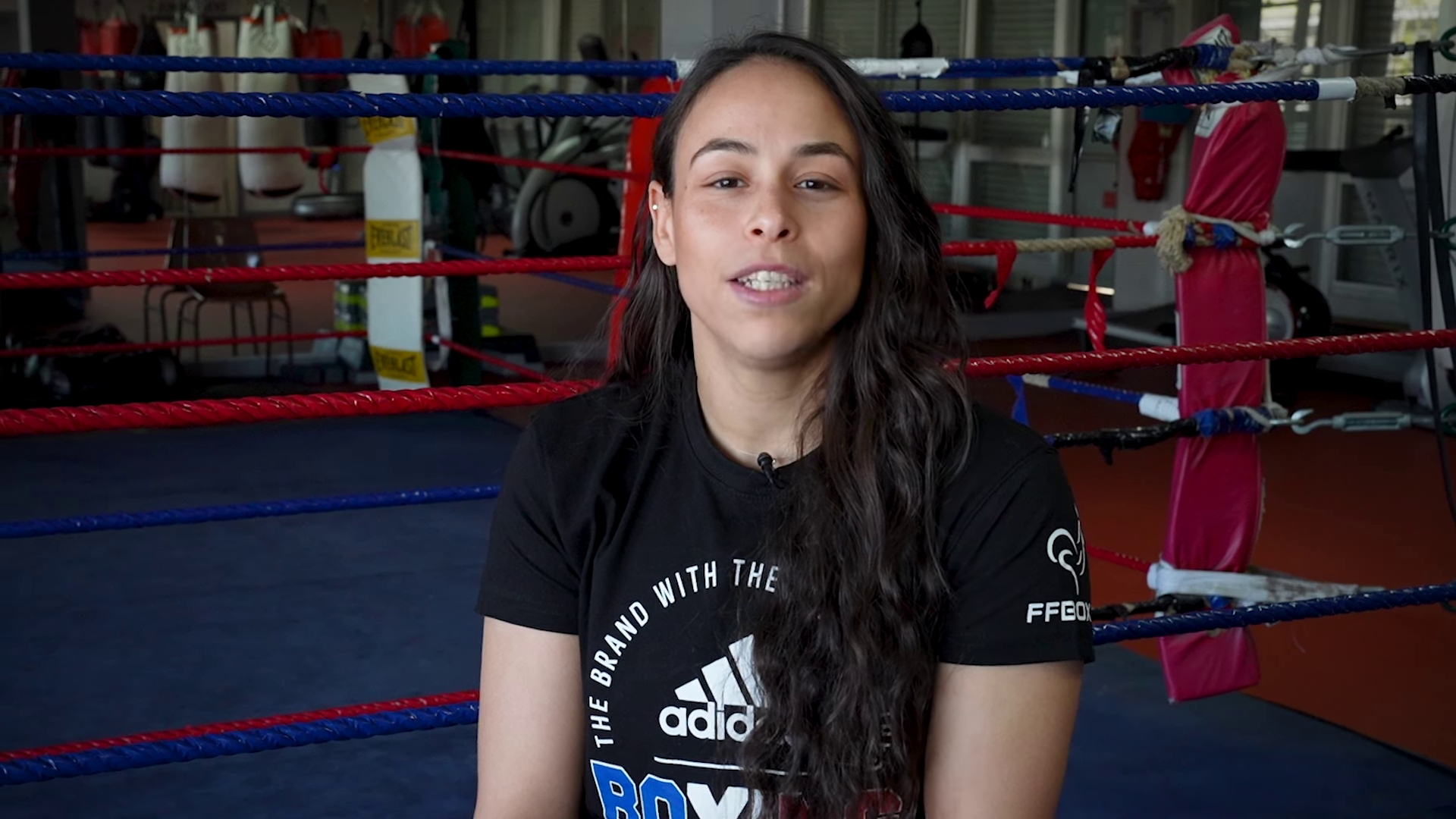
- Zidani in 2024

Personal information
- Born: 23 August 1993 (age 33)

Sport
- Country: France
- Sport: Boxing
- Weight class: 57 kg
Medal record
Women's boxing
Representing France
World Championships
Bronze medal – third place	2023 New Delhi	Featherweight
European Games
Gold medal – first place	2023 Kraków-Małopolska	Featherweight
Mediterranean Games
Silver medal – second place	2026 Taranto	Featherweight
Bronze medal – third place	2022 Oran	Lightweight

Amina Zidani (born 23 August 1993) is a French boxer competing in the featherweight (57 kg) division. She won the gold medal in the women's featherweight event at the 2023 European Games held in Poland. She won one of the bronze medals in the featherweight event at the 2023 IBA Women's World Boxing Championships held in New Delhi, India.

In 2018, Zidani competed in the lightweight event at the AIBA Women's World Boxing Championships held in New Delhi, India where she was eliminated in her first match. She also competed in the lightweight event at the 2019 AIBA Women's World Boxing Championships held in Ulan-Ude, Russia. She was eliminated in her first match.

Zidani won one of the bronze medals in the women's lightweight event at the 2022 Mediterranean Games held in Oran, Algeria. She won her first match and she then lost against eventual gold medalist Hadjila Khelif of Algeria.

Zidani won the gold medal in the women's featherweight event at the 2023 European Games held in Poland. As a result, she secured a quota place for the 2024 Summer Olympics in Paris, France. In the final, she defeated Svetlana Staneva of Bulgaria.

In August 2024, she competed in the women's 57 kg event at the 2024 Summer Olympics held in Paris, France. She was eliminated in her first match by Nesthy Petecio of the Philippines.
