= Dayana Sánchez =

Argentine boxer (born 1992)

Personal information
- Born: 28 August 1992 (age 34) Córdoba, Argentina
- Height: 173 cm (5 ft 8 in)

Boxing career
- Weight class: Lightweight
- Stance: Orthodox
Medal record
Women's amateur boxing
Representing Argentina
Pan American Games
Silver medal – second place	2015 Toronto	Lightweight
Silver medal – second place	2019 Lima	Lightweight

Dayana Erika Jhoanna Sánchez (born 28 August 1992) is an Argentine amateur boxer. She competed at the delayed 2020 Summer Olympics in Tokyo, Japan, becoming the first female boxer from Argentina to fight at an Olympics. Sanchez won silver medals at the 2015 Pan American Games in Toronto, Canada, and at the 2019 Pan American Games in Lima, Peru.

In November 2021, Sánchez and her sister, fellow international boxer Leonela, were both given four-year suspensions from the sport for failing anti-doping tests with the substance involved being furosemide and the bans backdated to 21 November 2019, the date when the failed tests were taken.
