= Anđela Branković =

Serbian boxer

Personal information
- Nationality: Serbia
- Born: 1998 (age 27–28)

Boxing career
Medal record
Women's amateur boxing
Representing Serbia
World Championships
Gold medal – first place	2025 Niš	Featherweight
European Championships
Bronze medal – third place	2024 Belgrade	Featherweight

Anđela Branković (born 1998) is a Serbian boxer. She competed at the 2024 European Amateur Boxing Championships, winning the bronze medal in the featherweight event. She also competed at the 2025 IBA Women's World Boxing Championships, winning the gold medal in the same event.
