= Nikolina Ćaćić =

Croatian boxer (born 2001)

Personal information
- Nationality: Croatian
- Born: 4 January 2001 (age 25) Zagreb, Croatia

Sport
- Sport: Boxing

Nikolina Ćaćić (born 4 January 2001) is a Croatian boxer. She competed in the women's featherweight event at the 2020 Summer Olympics.
