= Pwilao Basumatary =

Indian boxer

Personal information
- Nationality: Indian
- Born: 5 March 1993 (age 33) Chirang district, Assam
- Weight: 64 kg (141 lb)

Boxing career
- Weight class: Featherweight
- Stance: Orthodox
Medal record
Women's amateur boxing
Representing India
Asian Championships
Bronze medal – third place	2015 Wulanchabu	Featherweight

Pwilao Basumatary (born 5 March 1993) is an Indian boxer. She won bronze medal at the International Boxing Association (amateur) Women's Youth & Junior World Championships Antalya 2011. She won bronze medal at the 2nd India Open International Boxing Tournament in Guwahati. She won silver medal at the Cologne Boxing World Cup in Germany. She won bronze medal at the 70th Strandja Memorial Boxing Tournament in Bulgaria.

== Early life ==
Belonging to farmer's family she grew up in a remote village in Chirang district. Though her childhood was spent battling hunger and poverty her family became victims of the 2012 Assam violence. Her sports career began getting a place in the Sports Authority of India Special Area Games Centre in Kokrajhar.
