= Punrawee Ruenros =

Thai amateur boxer (born 1997)

Personal information
- Nickname: Fiaw
- Nationality: Thai
- Born: 31 August 1997 (age 29) Nakhon Si Thammarat, Thailand

Boxing career
- Weight class: Flyweight; Bantamweight
Medal record
Event	1st	2nd	3rd
World Championships	0	2	1
Asian Championships	1	1	0
Southeast Asian Games	1	0	0
Total	2	3	1
Women's amateur boxing
Representing Thailand
World Championships
Silver medal – second place	2022 Istanbul	Flyweight
Silver medal – second place	2025 Niš	Featherweight
Bronze medal – third place	2023 New Delhi	Bantamweight
Asian Championships
Gold medal – first place	2024 Chiang Mai	Featherweight
Silver medal – second place	2022 Amman	Bantamweight
Southeast Asian Games
Gold medal – first place	2023 Cambodia	Bantamweight

Punrawee Ruenros (Thai: ปุญณ์รวี รื่นรส, born 31 August 1997) or formerly Jutamas Jitpong (Thai: จุฑามาศ จิตรพงศ์) is a Thai amateur boxer. She represents Thailand at the 2020 Summer Olympics in Tokyo and the 2024 Summer Olympics in Paris.

In the 2024 Summer Olympics, she competes in the bantamweight division (54 kg), where she defeated Sara Ćirković from Serbia in the round of 32 4–1. In the round of 16, she lost to a Moroccan Widad Bertal in a close match 3–2.

After being eliminated, Ruenros (then Jitipong) gave an interview with tears welled up in her eyes, saying that she felt sorry, but she thought that she had fought her best. She thought that even though it was a close fight, she was able to hit the target and it should be a score, especially the third round. As for whether she will continue boxing in the future, she has not thought about it yet.
