= Sena Irie =

Japanese boxer (born 2000)

Sena Irie 入江 聖奈
Personal information
- Born: 9 October 2000 (age 26) Yonago, Tottori Prefecture, Japan
- Weight: Featherweight

Boxing career
- Stance: Orthodox
Medal record
Women's amateur boxing
Representing Japan
Olympic Games
Gold medal – first place	2020 Tokyo	Featherweight
Asian Championships
Silver medal – second place	2022 Amman	Featherweight

Sena Irie (入江 聖奈, Irie Sena; born 9 October 2000) is a Japanese retired amateur boxer who won a gold medal in the inaugural women's featherweight event at the 2020 Summer Olympics. She became the first Japanese woman to win an Olympic gold medal in boxing.

== Biography ==
Irie was born in Yonago, Japan in 2000. She took up boxing when she was seven years old at a local gym. Irie was inspired to box from the sports manga television series Ganbare Genki, which features a character who wants to become a boxer. She also took her inspiration from frogs.

At the 2020 Summer Olympics in Tokyo, Irie beat Karriss Artingstall of Great Britain in the semi-finals of the women's featherweight, and then went on to beat Nesthy Petecio of the Philippines in the final to win the gold medal. At the time of winning her gold medal, Irie was a university student at Nippon Sport Science University. Irie later stated that she would retire from boxing after graduating, with plans to work for a company making video games.

In September 2022, she announced that she would retire from boxing after her graduation in spring 2023.
