= Troy Garton =

New Zealand boxer (born 1988)

Personal information
- Nationality: New Zealand
- Born: 20 February 1988 (age 38) Auckland
- Height: 1.61 m (5 ft 3 in)

Sport
- Sport: Boxing
- Weight class: Lightweight
Medal record
Women's boxing
Representing New Zealand
Commonwealth Games
Bronze medal – third place	2018 Gold Coast	Lightweight

Troy Garton (born 20 February 1988) is a New Zealand amateur boxer. She won a bronze medal in the women's 60 kg division at the 2018 Commonwealth Games on the Gold Coast.

== Awards and recognitions ==
- 2019 Gladrap Boxing Awards Amateur Boxer of the Year (Nominated)
- 2020 New Zealand Fighter Boxing Awards Amateur female boxer of the year (Won)
