= Leonela Sánchez =

Argentine boxer (born 1994)

Personal information
- Born: 1994 (age 31–32) Córdoba, Argentina
- Height: 5 ft 5 in (165 cm)

Sport
- Sport: Boxing
- Weight class: Featherweight
Medal record
Women's amateur boxing
Representing Argentina
Pan American Games
| Gold medal – first place | 2019 Lima | 57 kg |

Leonela Sánchez (born 1994) is an Argentine boxer. She won the gold medal in the 57kg division at the 2019 Pan American Games, becoming the first female boxer from her country to achieve the feat. In November 2021, Sánchez and her sister, fellow international boxer Dayana, were both given four-year suspensions from the sport for failing anti-doping tests with the substance involved being furosemide and the bans backdated to 21 November 2019, the date when the failed tests were taken. She returned to boxing in June 2024.
