= Manisha Moun =

Indian boxer (born 1997)

Personal information
- Born: 23 December 1997 (age 28) Matour, Kaithal district, Haryana, India

Sport
- Sport: Boxing
- Weight class: Featherweight (57 kg)
Medal record
Women's amateur boxing
Representing India
World Championships
Bronze medal – third place	2022 Istanbul	Featherweight
Asian Championships
Bronze medal – third place	2019 Bangkok	Bantamweight

Manisha Moun (born 23 December 1997) is an Indian boxer who competes in the featherweight weight class. She won bronze at the 2019 Asian Amateur Boxing Championships.

== Early life ==
Moun was born on 23 December 1997 in Matour village at Kaithal district, Haryana. She was the youngest of three children and her father worked as a tractor mechanic, before becoming bedridden after two heart attacks.

Despite being disallowed by her parents from taking part in any sport, Moun would sneak out of the house with her brother to play volleyball. She was soon noticed by a boxing coach and started her training at the age of 12, while keeping it a secret from her father. He discovered her participation two years later when he read a newspaper report of her winning a medal in a district-level competition. Moun states that she used to fight in her locality and "beat up boys a lot" during her childhood.

== Career ==
=== 2018 ===
Moun won her first senior medal, when she came second at the 2018 National Championships. In the 2018 AIBA Women's World Boxing Championships, she made it to the quarterfinals in the bantamweight category; her wins over higher-ranked Christina Cruz and defending champion Dina Zholaman received praise.

=== 2019 ===
She again won a silver medal at the 2019 National Championships before going on to win a bronze medal at the 2019 Asian Amateur Boxing Championships, where she lost to Huang Hsiao-wen in a 2–3 split decision.

After switching to the featherweight category, Moun was not selected for the 2019 AIBA Women's World Boxing Championships.
