= Claudia Nechita =

Romanian boxer (born 1993)

Personal information
- Full name: Maria Claudia Nechita
- Nationality: Romanian
- Born: 15 August 1993 (age 32) Câmpulung

Sport
- Sport: Boxing
Medal record
Women's amateur boxing
Representing Romania
European Championships
Bronze medal – third place	2024 Belgrade	Featherweight

Maria Claudia Nechita (born 15 August 1993) is a Romanian boxer. She competed in the women's featherweight event at the 2020 Summer Olympics. In April 2024, Nechita won a bronze medal in her event at the European Amateur Boxing Championships held in Belgrade, Serbia.
