= Alessia Mesiano =

Italian boxer (born 1991)

Personal information
- Nationality: Italian
- Born: 7 December 1991 (age 34)
- Height: 169 cm (5 ft 7 in)
- Weight: 60 kg (132 lb)

Boxing career
Medal record
Women's amateur boxing
Representing Italy
World Championships
Gold medal – first place	2016 Astana	Featherweight
Bronze medal – third place	2014 Jeju City	Featherweight
Bronze medal – third place	2022 Istanbul	Lightweight
European Championships
Bronze medal – third place	2014 Bucharest	Featherweight

Alessia Mesiano (born 7 December 1991) is an Italian amateur boxer, who was the 2016 AIBA world champion in the 57 kg.

Alessia Meisano is an athlete of Fiamme Oro.
