= Yarisel Ramirez =

American boxer

Personal information
- National team: United States
- Born: 11 December 1999 (age 26) Guantanamo, Cuba

Sport
- Sport: Boxing
Medal record
Women's amateur boxing
Representing United States
Pan American Games
Bronze medal – third place	2019 Lima	Bantamweight

Yarisel Ramirez is an American boxer.She won the bronze medal in the 2019 Pan American Games in Boxing in the Bantamweight category.
