= Caroline Veyre =

Canadian boxer (born 1988)

Personal information
- Nickname: Caro
- Nationality: Canadian
- Born: 4 October 1988 (age 37) Paris, France
- Height: 167 cm (5 ft 6 in)
- Weight: Lightweight, Featherweight, Super-featherweight

Boxing career
- Stance: Orthodox

Boxing record
- Total fights: 13
- Wins: 11
- Win by KO: 0
- Losses: 2
Medal record
Women's amateur boxing
Representing Canada
Pan American Games
Gold medal – first place	2015 Toronto	Lightweight

Caroline Veyre (born 4 October 1988) is a French-born Canadian professional boxer. She held the WBC female super-featherweight title in 2026. As an amateur Veyre won a gold medal in the women's lightweight category at the 2015 Pan American Games and competed at the delayed Tokyo 2020 Summer Olympics.

== Early life ==
Born in Paris, France, Veyre immigrated to Canada in 2003 after visiting the country a few years earlier as her mother underwent cancer treatment in Montreal.

== Amateur career ==
Veyre started boxing at age 18 as a way to stay in shape and learn self-defense. Fighting out of Club Boxe de l'Est in Montreal, she won national titles in 2013 and 2014.

At the 2015 Pan American Games in Toronto, Canada, Veyre won the gold medal in the lightweight category defeating Argentina's Dayana Sánchez by split decision in the final.

In 2016, Veyre suffered a shoulder injury which prevented her from qualifying for the 2016 Summer Olympics in Brazil. Upon her return, she won a silver medal at the 2017 American Boxing Confederation Continental Championships in Tegucigalpa, Honduras, losing in the final to Brazil's Beatriz Ferreira.

She reached the quarter-finals at both the 2018 AIBA Women's World Boxing Championships in New Delhi, India, and the 2018 Commonwealth Games in Glasgow, Scotland.

Veyre switched to the featherweight category for the delayed 2020 Summer Olympics in Tokyo, Japan, reaching the quarter-finals where she lost to Italy's Irma Testa by unanimous decision.

== Professional career ==
Veyre turned professional in 2022, making her pro-debut on 6 August that year with a unanimous decision win over Liliana Marisela Borquez from Mexico in a four-round contest at the Civic Complex, Cornwall, Ontario, Canada.

She faced Licia Boudersa for the vacant WBC Silver female featherweight title at Little Caesars Arena in Detroit, Michigan, USA, on 26 July 2025, as part of the undercard for the Claressa Shields vs Lani Daniels undisputed female heavyweight championship fight. She won by unanimous decision.

Veyre fought Delfine Persoon for the vacant WBC female super-featherweight title at GLC Live at 20 Monroe in Grand Rapids, Michigan, USA, on 10 February 2026. She won by unanimous decision.

In her first defense, Veyre faced undefeated IBO female super-featherweight champion Bernice Ferreira at State Farm Arena in Atlanta, Georgia, USA, on 15 August 2026. She lost when she was disqualified in the eighth round for persistent holding.

== Personal life ==
Veyre has a degree in translation.

== Professional boxing record ==
13 fights	11 wins	2 losses
By decision	11	1
By disqualification	0	1

No.	Result	Record	Opponent	Type	Round, time	Date	Location	Notes
13	Loss	11–2	(South Africa) Bernice Ferreira	DQ	8 (10), 1:04	15 August 2026	(United States) State Farm Arena, Atlanta, Georgia, USA	Lost WBC female super-featherweight title; for IBO female super-featherweight title
12	Win	11–1	(Belgium) Delfine Persoon	UD	10	10 February 2026	(United States) .GLC Live at 20 Monroe in Grand Rapids, Michigan, USA	Won vacant WBC female super-featherweight title
11	Win	10–1	(France) Licia Boudersa	UD	10	26 July 2025	(United States) Little Caesars Arena, Detroit, Michigan, USA	Won vacant WBC Silver female featherweight title
10	Win	9–1	(United States) Carmen Vargas	UD	8	2 February 2025	(United States) Dort Financial Center, Flint, Michigan, USA	
9	Win	8–1	(Uruguay) Gabriela Bouvier	UD	10	12 December 2024	(United States) Dort Financial Center, Flint, Michigan, USA	Won the WBC female featherweight International title
8	Loss	7–1	(Mexico) Joana Chavarria Lopez	UD	10	21 September 2024	(Mexico) Naucalpan, México	
7	Win	7–0	(Argentina) Agustina Marisa Belen Rojas	UD	8	14 March 2024	Montreal Casino, Montreal, Ontario, Canada	
6	Win	6–0	(Italy) Jessica Bellusci	UD	8	7 October 2023	Place Bell, Laval, Quebec, Canada	
5	Win	5–0	(Mexico) Karina Travieso Chavez	UD	8	7 September 2023	Montreal Casino, Montreal, Ontario, Canada	
4	Win	4–0	(France) Emma Gongora	UD	8	12 May 2023	Place Bell, Laval, Quebec, Canada	
3	Win	3–0	(France) Anaëlle Angerville	UD	6	16 March 2023	Place Bell, Laval, Quebec, Canada	
2	Win	2–0	(Mexico) Estefania González Franco	UD	6	13 January 2023	Place Bell, Laval, Quebec, Canada	
1	Win	1–0	(Mexico) Liliana Marisela Borquez	UD	4	6 August 2022	Civic Complex, Cornwall, Ontario, Canada	
