= Anja Stridsman =

Australian boxer

Personal information
- Citizenship: Australia and Sweden
- Born: Örnäset, Luleå, Sweden
- Height

Sport
- Country: Australia
- Sport: Boxing
- Club: Umina PCYC
- Coached by: Joel Keegan

Anja Stridsman is a Swedish-born Australian boxer. She won the women's 60-kilogram class gold medal at the 2018 Commonwealth Games.
