= Yodgoroy Mirzaeva =

Uzbekistani boxer (born 1996)

Personal information
- Nationality: Uzbekistani
- Born: 22 April 1996 (age 30) Kattakurgan, Uzbekistan

Sport
- Sport: Boxing

Yodgoroy Mirzaeva (born 22 April 1996) is an Uzbekistani female boxer.

She competed at the 2016 Summer Olympics in Rio de Janeiro, in the women's flyweight.
