= Liudmila Vorontsova =

Russian boxer (born 1999)

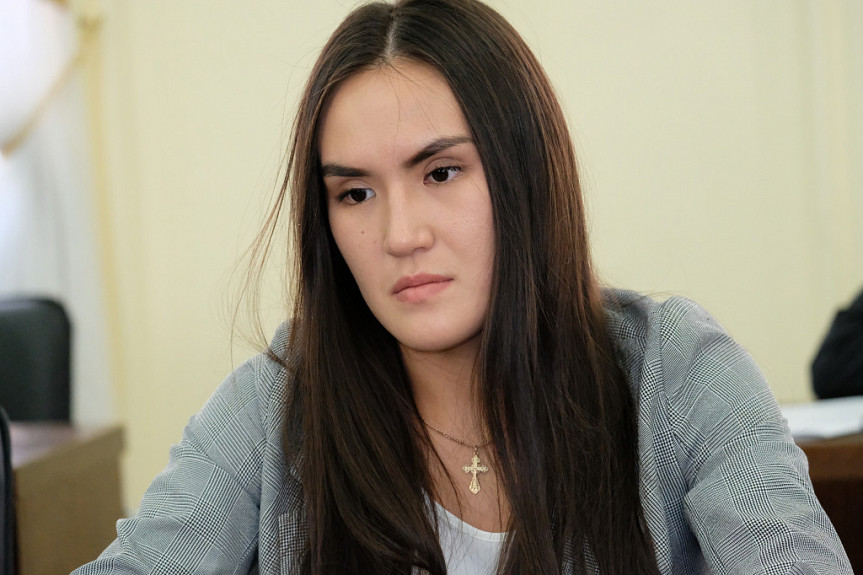
- photo by Petr Sanzhiev, 2019

Personal information
- Nationality: (Russia) Russian
- Born: 22 February 1999 (age 27) Petropavlovka, Dzhidinsky District, Republic of Buryatia, Russia

Boxing career
- Weight class: Featherweight

Boxing record
- Total fights: 5
- Wins: 5
- Win by KO: 0
- Losses: 0
- Draws: 0
- No contests: 0
Medal record
Women's amateur boxing
Representing Russia
IBA World Championships
Silver medal – second place	2019 Ulan-Ude	Featherweight
European Boxing Championships
Silver medal – second place	2026 Sofia	57 kg

Liudmila Sergeyevna Vorontsova (Russian: Людмила Сергеевна Воронцова; born 22 February 1999) is a Russian boxer, a participant of the 2020 Summer Olympics in Tokyo.

She won a medal at the 2019 AIBA Women's World Boxing Championships.

The first coach was Jargal Tsoktoevich Tasarunov.
