= Michaela Walsh (boxer) =

Irish boxer (born 1993)

Personal information
- Born: 5 June 1993 (age 33) Belfast, Northern Ireland
- Height: 168 cm (5 ft 6 in)
- Weight: Flyweight; Featherweight

Boxing career
Medal record
Women's amateur boxing
Representing Ireland
European Games
Silver medal – second place	2019 Minsk	Featherweight
Bronze medal – third place	2023 Kraków-Małopolska	Featherweight
EUBC European Championships
Bronze medal – third place	2018 Sofia	Featherweight
Bronze medal – third place	2022 Budva	Featherweight
European Boxing Championships
Bronze medal – third place	2026 Sofia	57 kg
European Union Championships
Gold medal – first place	2017 Cascia	Bantamweight
Representing Northern Ireland
Commonwealth Games
Silver medal – second place	2026 Glasgow	57kg
Gold medal – first place	2022 Birmingham	Featherweight
Silver medal – second place	2014 Glasgow	Flyweight
Silver medal – second place	2018 Gold Coast	Featherweight

Michaela Walsh (born 5 June 1993) is an amateur boxer from Ireland who fights in the featherweight division (54 – 57 kg). Walsh is an Olympian, who competed at the 2020 Summer Olympics and 2024 Summer Olympics.

In the 2014 Commonwealth Games in Glasgow Walsh won a silver medal in the flyweight division. At the 2018 Commonwealth Games she moved to featherweight and again won silver. In the 2022 Commonwealth games held in Birmingham, Michaela won gold. In the 2026 Commonwealth games in Glasgow, Michaela won silver, losing to Jaismine Lamboria in the final.

Michaela and Aidan her brother, became the first brother and sister to qualify for the Tokyo Olympic Games in boxing, both qualifying in June 2021.

Her brother Aidan is also a boxer who won gold at the 2022 Commonwealth Games and a bronze medal at the Tokyo 2020 Summer Olympics.

She boxes out of Emerald boxing club in Belfast.
