= Irma Testa =

Italian boxer (born 1997)

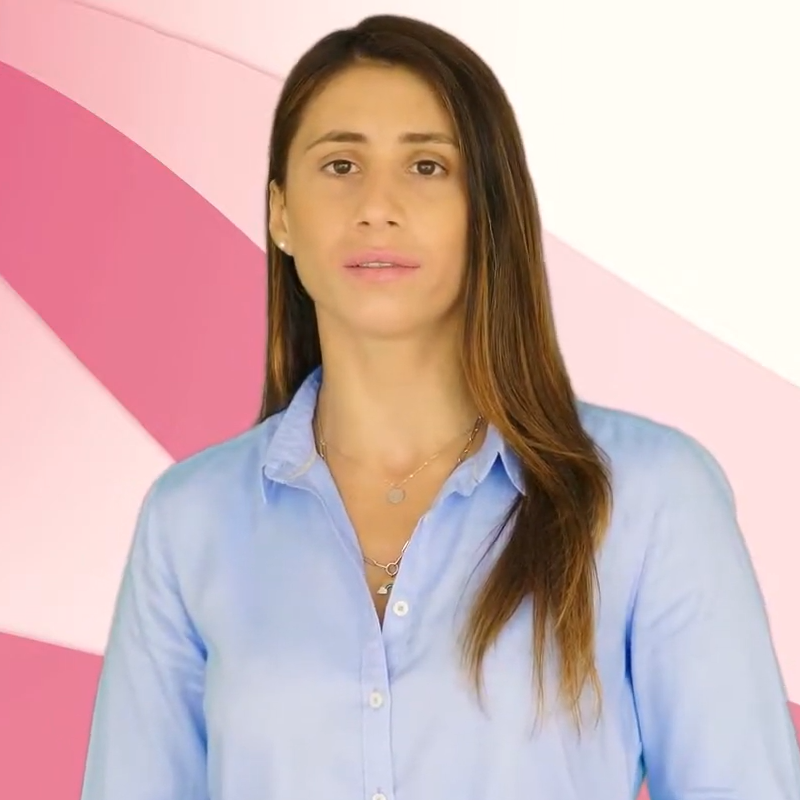
- Irma Testa

Personal information
- Nationality: Italian
- Born: 28 December 1997 (age 28) Torre Annunziata, Italy

Boxing career
Medal record
Women's amateur boxing
Representing Italy
Olympic Games
Bronze medal – third place	2020 Tokyo	Featherweight
World Championships
Gold medal – first place	2023 New Delhi	Featherweight
Silver medal – second place	2022 Istanbul	Featherweight
European Games
Bronze medal – third place	2023 Kraków-Małopolska	Featherweight
European Championships
Gold medal – first place	2019 Alcobendas	Featherweight
Gold medal – first place	2022 Budva	Featherweight
Mediterranean Games
Gold medal – first place	2026 Taranto	Featherweight
Youth Olympic Games
Silver medal – second place	2014 Nanjing	Flyweight

Irma "Butterfly" Testa (born 28 December 1997) is an Italian boxer. She competed at the 2016 Summer Olympics, and won a bronze medal in the women's featherweight event at the 2020 Summer Olympics.

In 2021, she came out as queer.
