= Lin Yu-ting =

Taiwanese boxer (born 1995)

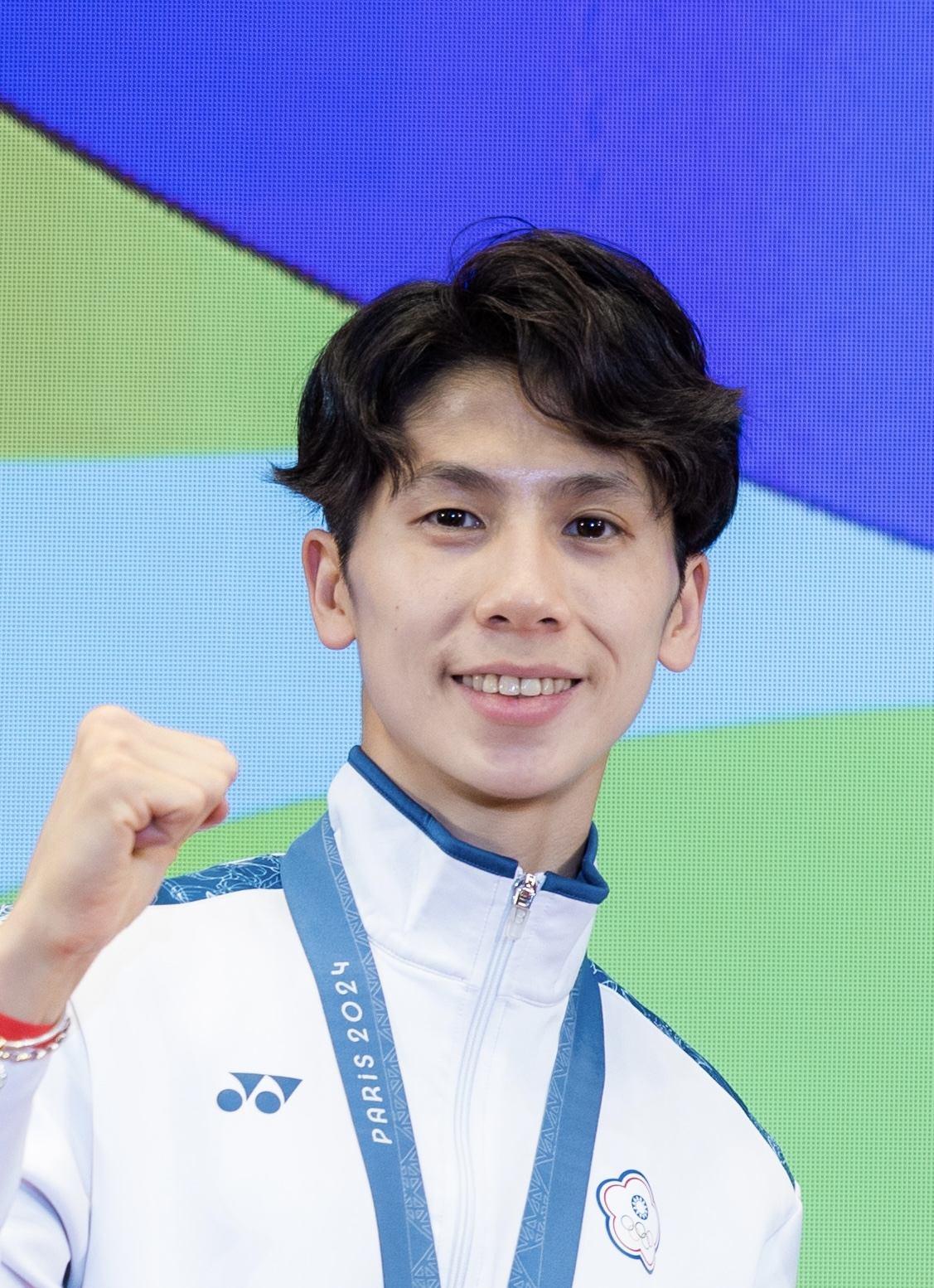
- Lin in 2024

Personal information
- Native name: 林郁婷
- Born: 13 December 1995 (age 30) Taipei County, Taiwan (now New Taipei City, Taiwan)
- Height: 175 cm (5 ft 9 in)

Boxing career
- Weight class: Featherweight
- Stance: Southpaw

Boxing record
- Total fights: 71
- Wins: 52
- Win by KO: 1
- Losses: 16
- Draws: 0
- No contests: 3
Medal record
Women's amateur boxing
Representing Chinese Taipei
Event	1st	2nd	3rd
Olympic Games	1	0	0
World Championships	2	0	1
Asian Games	2	0	1
Asian Championships	2	0	0
Total	7	0	2
Olympic Games
Gold medal – first place	2024 Paris	Featherweight
World Championships
Gold medal – first place	2018 New Delhi	Bantamweight
Gold medal – first place	2022 Istanbul	Featherweight
Bronze medal – third place	2019 Ulan-Ude	Featherweight
Disqualified	2023 New Delhi	Featherweight
Asian Games
Gold medal – first place	2022 Hangzhou	Featherweight
Gold medal – first place	2026 Aichi–Nagoya	60 kg
Bronze medal – third place	2018 Jakarta-Palembang	51 kg
Asian Championships
Gold medal – first place	2017 Ho Chi Minh City	Bantamweight
Gold medal – first place	2019 Bangkok	Featherweight

Lin Yu-ting (Chinese: 林郁婷; pinyin: Lín Yùtíng; born 13 December 1995) is a Taiwanese amateur boxer. She has won two gold medals at the IBA World Boxing Championships, in addition to two gold medals at the Asian Games and one at the Asian Amateur Boxing Championships. She competed for Taiwan at the 2024 Summer Olympics where she defeated Julia Szeremeta of Poland in the final of the women's 57 kg category (featherweight). Lin is the first Taiwanese boxer to win an Olympic gold medal. She had been the subject of controversy following disputed sex verification testing during the 2024 Olympics.

== Background ==
Lin has three siblings; as a child, she and her older brother watched the anime Hajime no Ippo, which inspired her to consider boxing. Lin also learned boxing in an effort to protect her mother from domestic abuse. She began training in her first year of junior high school and was, by her second year, showing talent in the boxing ring and winning boxing competitions in Taiwan.

Lin received her bachelor's and master's degrees from the Chinese Culture University in Taiwan. She is currently a doctoral student at the Graduate Institute of Business Administration at Fu Jen Catholic University. Both universities are famous for their sports disciplines.

== Career ==
Lin won a gold medal at the 2018 AIBA Women's World Boxing Championships as a bantamweight, followed by a medal at the 2019 AIBA Women's World Boxing Championships. She competed in the 2020 Tokyo Olympics but did not win a medal.

Lin was disqualified from the 2023 Women's World Boxing Championships organised by the Russian-led International Boxing Association (IBA) after failing unspecified gender eligibility tests, along with Algerian boxer Imane Khelif. She was stripped of a bronze medal, which was instead awarded to Bulgaria's Svetlana Staneva. The International Olympic Committee (IOC) and its Paris Boxing Unit criticized the disqualification as "sudden and arbitrary" and taken "without any due process". The Washington Post stated, "It remains unclear what standards Khelif and Lin Yu Ting failed [in 2023] to lead to the disqualifications." The IBA did not reveal the testing methodology, stating the "specifics remain confidential". The IBA's Olympic status was revoked in June 2023, due to governance issues and perceived judging and refereeing corruption.

In 2023, she successfully competed at the Hangzhou Asian Games, where the Medical Committee confirmed her eligibility. Lin won Taiwan's first gold medal in boxing at the event, fighting in the 57 kg category.

=== 2024 Summer Olympics ===
The boxing events in Paris for the 2024 Summer Olympics were managed by the IOC's Paris 2024 Boxing Unit. IOC President Thomas Bach defended the participation of Khelif and Lin: "There was never any doubt about them being a woman". Taiwanese President Lai Ching-te and former President Tsai Ing-wen also both expressed support for Lin in August 2024.

Lin won the gold medal after defeating Julia Szeremeta of Poland in the final of the women's 57 kg category (featherweight). With this win, Lin became the first Taiwanese boxer to win an Olympic gold medal.

During the International Boxing Association (IBA) press conference in Paris on 5 August 2024, the position of the organization and its president Umar Kremlev regarding the nature of the conducted tests underwent changes and became contradictory. Initially, the IBA claimed that gender tests were conducted, but at the conference, Secretary General Chris Roberts spoke of "chromosome tests", while Kremlev asserted that the tests were aimed at determining testosterone levels in athletes. The situation was exacerbated by Kremlev's harsh statements; he repeatedly criticized IOC President Thomas Bach, declared his intention to initiate legal proceedings against him and expressed dissatisfaction with the Olympic Games opening ceremony, calling it "humiliating". The IBA claimed to have used laboratories accredited by the World Anti-Doping Agency (WADA) for testing, but WADA denied involvement in gender verification, stating it deals solely with anti-doping matters.

=== Return to boxing ===
After World Boxing assumed control of world boxing competitions, Lin Yu-ting initially refused to undergo testing due to the changing and unclear methodology and lack of communication from World Boxing. Three months later, in September 2025, World Boxing announced Lin Yu-Ting was still disallowed. The Chinese Taipei Boxing Association had said that all test results had been filed, but no response had been given regarding Lin Yu-Ting's eligibility to compete.

In March 2026, the World Boxing Medical Committee had "considered and evaluated the medical documentation presented and determined that the boxer was deemed to be female and eligible to compete in the female category". The Chinese Taipei Boxing Association described the decision as a "tremendous relief" for Lin, and announced her intention to compete at the impending Asian Boxing Championships, held in Mongolia between 29 March and 10 April.
