= Mijgona Samadova =

Tajik boxer

- Миджгона Самадова
- Born: 8 September 1998; Dushanbe
- Occupation: Boxer

Mijgona Samadova, OLY (born 8 September 1998) is a Tajik boxer who represented Tajikistan at 2024 Paris Summer Olympics.

Mijgona Samadova was born on 8 September 1998 in Dushanbe. She made her boxing debut in 2018.

Samadova competed in the Lightweight category at the 2023 IBA Women's World Boxing Championships in March 2023. Samadova won a bronze medal in the Women's 57 kg boxing category at the 2022 Asian Games, held in September and October 2023. Her medal win qualified her to represent Tajikistan at the 2024 Summer Olympics. She also won the Tajikistan president's prize of 50,000 somonis and a one-room apartment in Dushanbe.

Asian Games
Year	Location	Medal	Category
2022	Hangzhou, China	Bronze	57 kg

== Paris 2024 Olympic Results ==
- Defeated via split decision by Allysa Mendoza (3-2)
