= Boxing at the 2020 Summer Olympics – Qualification =

Qualification for the boxing events at the 2020 Summer Olympics is determined by the performances at four Continental Olympic Qualifying Tournaments (Africa, Americas, Asia & Oceania, and Europe) and at the World Olympic Qualification Tournament, all of which were scheduled to take place on two separate phases because of the consequent Olympic delay and the circumstances involved in the COVID-19 crisis: January to March 2020 and April to June 2021. The event is set to return to London in 2021. The World Olympic Qualifying Tournament is currently in contention of being held. The current consensus is in its cancellation, but changes may occur. The 2020 European Boxing Olympic Qualification Tournament may yet again be postponed, this time to June, 2021. AIBA was suspended by the IOC as the Olympic governing body for boxing in 2019. However, AIBA has reiterated its offer to work with the IOC Boxing Task Force to ensure the Olympic qualifying events can still take place. Further negotiations continue. If the 2020 World Olympic Qualifying Tournament is canceled, fifty-three quota places that would have been available at the World Olympic Qualifier will now be assigned based on rankings instead, with the best-ranked boxer per region, per weight category receiving a Tokyo 2020 berth.

== Timeline ==
Event	Date	Venue
2020 African Boxing Olympic Qualification Tournament	20–29 February 2020	(Senegal) Diamniadio
2020 Asia & Oceania Boxing Olympic Qualification Tournament	3–11 March 2020	(Jordan) Amman (Note: Originally scheduled to be held in Wuhan, China from February 3–14, 2020 but was cancelled by local organizers amidst concerns over the COVID-19 pandemic which believed to originate from the city. The qualifiers were moved to Jordan.)
2020 European Boxing Olympic Qualification Tournament	14–16 March 2020 (Day 1–3); 4–8 June 2021 (Day 4–8)	(United Kingdom) London (France) Villebon-sur-Yvette
2021 Pan American Boxing Olympic Qualification Tournament	Cancelled	(Argentina) Buenos Aires (Note: Originally scheduled from March 26–April 3, 2020 due to the COVID-19 pandemic in Argentina, but was then rescheduled for May 10–16, 2021 until it was cancelled due to then-rising virus cases in the city. The highest ranking placements from BTF Americas would directly enter their quota spots instead.)

== Qualification summary ==
NOC	Men								Women					Total
NOC	52	57	63	69	75	81	91	+91	51	57	60	69	75	Total
Algeria	Yes				Yes	Yes	Yes	Yes	Yes		Yes		Yes	8
Antigua and Barbuda			Yes											1
Argentina	Yes	Yes		Yes	Yes						Yes			5
Armenia	Yes		Yes		Yes									3
Australia	Yes		Yes			Yes				Yes			Yes	5
Azerbaijan		Yes	Yes	Yes		Yes		Yes						5
Bahrain								Yes						1
Belarus			Yes	Yes	Yes		Yes							4
Botswana	Yes									Yes				2
Brazil			Yes		Yes	Yes	Yes		Yes	Yes	Yes			7
Bulgaria	Yes								Yes	Yes				3
Burundi									Yes					1
Cameroon				Yes	Yes			Yes						3
Canada				Yes					Yes	Yes		Yes	Yes	5
Cape Verde	Yes													1
China	Yes				Yes	Yes			Yes			Yes	Yes	6
Colombia	Yes	Yes				Yes		Yes	Yes	Yes				6
Croatia						Yes				Yes				2
Cuba	Yes	Yes	Yes	Yes		Yes	Yes	Yes						7
Democratic Republic of the Congo			Yes		Yes					Yes	Yes			4
Dominican Republic	Yes	Yes	Yes	Yes	Yes				Yes			Yes		7
Ecuador		Yes					Yes				Yes		Yes	4
Egypt						Yes		Yes						2
El Salvador										Yes				1
Eswatini				Yes										1
Finland											Yes			1
France	Yes	Yes	Yes	Yes				Yes			Yes			6
Georgia	Yes			Yes	Yes									3
Germany		Yes					Yes					Yes		3
Ghana	Yes	Yes				Yes								3
Great Britain	Yes	Yes	Yes	Yes		Yes	Yes	Yes	Yes	Yes	Yes		Yes	11
Guyana		Yes												1
Haiti					Yes									1
Hungary		Yes												1
India	Yes		Yes	Yes	Yes			Yes	Yes		Yes	Yes	Yes	9
Iran		Yes			Yes									2
Ireland	Yes	Yes		Yes		Yes				Yes	Yes		Yes	7
Italy									Yes	Yes	Yes	Yes		4
Jamaica								Yes						1
Japan	Yes			Yes	Yes				Yes	Yes				5
Jordan		Yes	Yes	Yes		Yes	Yes							5
Kazakhstan	Yes	Yes	Yes	Yes	Yes	Yes	Yes	Yes					Yes	9
Kenya		Yes					Yes		Yes			Yes		4
Kosovo											Yes			1
Mauritius			Yes	Yes										2
Mexico						Yes					Yes	Yes		3
Mongolia		Yes	Yes										Yes	3
Morocco		Yes	Yes			Yes	Yes		Yes			Yes	Yes	7
Mozambique												Yes	Yes	2
Namibia			Yes											1
Netherlands			Yes										Yes	2
New Zealand							Yes							1
Panama													Yes	1
Papua New Guinea			Yes											1
Peru			Yes				Yes							2
Philippines	Yes				Yes				Yes	Yes				4
Poland			Yes						Yes			Yes	Yes	4
Puerto Rico	Yes													1
Romania	Yes									Yes				2
Refugee Olympic Team			Yes		Yes									2
ROC		Yes	Yes	Yes	Yes	Yes	Yes	Yes	Yes	Yes		Yes	Yes	11
Samoa				Yes			Yes							2
Serbia									Yes					1
Slovakia					Yes									1
Somalia										Yes				1
South Korea										Yes	Yes			2
Spain	Yes	Yes				Yes	Yes							4
Sweden					Yes						Yes			2
Chinese Taipei									Yes	Yes	Yes	Yes		4
Tajikistan			Yes			Yes		Yes						3
Thailand	Yes	Yes							Yes		Yes	Yes		5
Trinidad and Tobago					Yes									1
Tunisia										Yes	Yes			2
Turkey	Yes		Yes			Yes			Yes		Yes	Yes		6
Uganda				Yes	Yes				Yes					3
Ukraine		Yes	Yes		Yes			Yes				Yes		5
United States		Yes	Yes	Yes	Yes			Yes	Yes	Yes	Yes	Yes	Yes	10
Uzbekistan	Yes	Yes	Yes	Yes	Yes	Yes	Yes	Yes	Yes		Yes	Yes		11
Venezuela	Yes					Yes			Yes					3
Vietnam		Yes							Yes					2
Zambia	Yes	Yes		Yes										3
Total: 81 NOCs	28	27	29	23	25	22	17	17	26	21	21	18	17	291

== Men's events ==
Olympic qualification system per continent and by weight category. The final list of qualifiers was announced on July 15, 2021.

Weight	Continental Qualifier				World Qualifier	Host Country	TCI Places	Total Quota
Weight	Africa	Americas	AS & OC	Europe	World Qualifier	Host Country	TCI Places	Total Quota
52 kg	3	5	6	8	4	1	1	28
57 kg	3	5	6	8	4	0	1	27
63 kg	3	5	6	8	4	1	1	28
69 kg	3	4	5	6	4	0	1	24
75 kg	3	4	5	6	4	1	1	24
81 kg	3	4	5	6	4	0	0	22
91 kg	2	3	4	4	4	0	0	17
+91 kg	2	3	4	4	4	0	0	17
Total	22	33	41	50	32	0-4	5	186

=== Flyweight (52 kg) ===
Competition	Places	Qualified boxer
Host Country	1	Ryomei Tanaka (JPN)
Olympic Qualifying Event – Africa	3	Mohamed Flissi (ALG); Patrick Chinyemba (ZAM); Sulemanu Tetteh (GHA)
Olympic Qualifying Event – Americas	5	Yosvany Veitía (CUB); Yuberjen Martínez (COL); Yankiel Rivera (PUR); Rodrigo Marte (DOM); Ramón Quiroga (ARG)
Olympic Qualifying Event – Asia/Oceania	6	Hu Jianguan (CHN); Thitisan Panmod (THA); Amit Panghal (IND); Shakhobidin Zoirov (UZB); Alex Winwood (AUS); Saken Bibossinov (KAZ)
Olympic Qualifying Event – Europe	8	Billal Bennama (FRA); Sakhil Alakhverdovi (GEO); Brendan Irvine (IRL); Gabriel Escobar (ESP); Galal Yafai (GBR); Koryun Soghomonyan (ARM); Cosmin Girleanu (ROU); Batuhan Çiftçi (TUR)
World Allocation	4	Rajab Otukile Mahommed (BOT); Carlo Paalam (PHI); Yoel Finol (VEN); Daniel Asenov (BUL)
Tripartite Invitation	1	Daniel Varela de Pina (CPV)
Total	28	

=== Featherweight (57 kg) ===
Competition	Places	Qualified boxer
Host Country	0	—
Olympic Qualifying Event – Africa	3	Everisto Mulenga (ZAM); Nick Okoth (KEN); Samuel Takyi (GHA)
Olympic Qualifying Event – Americas	5	Lázaro Álvarez (CUB); Alexy de la Cruz (DOM); Jean Caicedo (ECU); Ceiber Ávila (COL); Mirko Cuello (ARG)
Olympic Qualifying Event – Asia/Oceania	6	Mirazizbek Mirzakhalilov (UZB); Mohammad Al-Wadi (JOR); Serik Temirzhanov (KAZ); Nguyễn Văn Đương (VIE); Danial Shahbakhsh (IRI); Chatchai Butdee (THA)
Olympic Qualifying Event – Europe	8	Peter McGrail (GBR); Roland Gálos (HUN); Samuel Kistohurry (FRA); Tayfur Aliyev (AZE); Mykola Butsenko (UKR); José Quiles (ESP); Albert Batyrgaziev (ROC); Hamsat Shadalov (GER)
World Allocation	4	Mohamed Hamout (MAR); Erdenebatyn Tsendbaatar (MGL); Duke Ragan (USA); Kurt Walker (IRL)
Tripartite Invitation	1	Keevin Allicock (GUY)
Total	27	

=== Lightweight (63 kg) ===
Competition	Places	Qualified boxer
Host Country	1	Daisuke Narimatsu (JPN)
Olympic Qualifying Event – Africa	3	Jonas Junius (NAM); Richarno Colin (MRI); Abdelhaq Nadir (MAR)
Olympic Qualifying Event – Americas	5	Andy Cruz (CUB); Leonel de los Santos (DOM); Wanderson Oliveira (BRA); Leodan Pezo (PER); Alston Ryan (ANT)
Olympic Qualifying Event – Asia/Oceania	6	Elnur Abduraimov (UZB); Zakir Safiullin (KAZ); Baatarsükhiin Chinzorig (MGL); Obada Al-Kasbeh (JOR); Manish Kaushik (IND); Bakhodur Usmonov (TJK)
Olympic Qualifying Event – Europe	8	Luke McCormack (GBR); Gabil Mamedov (ROC); Damian Durkacz (POL); Enrico Lacruz (NED); Dzmitry Asanau (BLR); Javid Chalabiyev (AZE); Sofiane Oumiha (FRA); Yaroslav Khartsyz (UKR)
World Allocation	4	Fiston Mbaya Mulumba (COD); Harrison Garside (AUS); Keyshawn Davis (USA); Hovhannes Bachkov (ARM)
Tripartite Invitation	1	John Ume (PNG)
Invitational place	1	Wessam Salamana (EOR)
Total	29	

=== Welterweight (69 kg) ===
Competition	Places	Qualified boxer
Olympic Qualifying Event – Africa	3	Stephen Zimba (ZAM); Albert Mengue (CMR); Shadiri Bwogi (UGA)
Olympic Qualifying Event – Americas	4	Roniel Iglesias (CUB); Rohan Polanco (DOM); Delante Johnson (USA); Brian Arregui (ARG)
Olympic Qualifying Event – Asia/Oceania	5	Zeyad Ishaish (JOR); Vikas Krishan Yadav (IND); Bobo-Usmon Baturov (UZB); Ablaikhan Zhussupov (KAZ); Sewon Okazawa (JPN)
Olympic Qualifying Event – Europe	6	Pat McCormack (GBR); Aidan Walsh (IRL); Lorenzo Sotomayor (AZE); Andrey Zamkovoy (ROC); Eskerkhan Madiev (GEO); Aliaksandr Radzionau (BLR)
World Allocation	4	Merven Clair (MRI); Marion Faustino Ah Tong (SAM); Wyatt Sanford (CAN); ~~Yevhenii Barabanov (UKR)~~; Necat Ekinci (TUR)
Tripartite Invitation	1	Thabiso Dlamini (SWZ)
Total	23	

=== Middleweight (75 kg) ===
Competition	Places	Qualified boxer
Host Country	1	Yuito Moriwaki (JPN)
Olympic Qualifying Event – Africa	3	Younes Nemouchi (ALG); David Tshama (COD); Wilfried Ntsengue (CMR)
Olympic Qualifying Event – Americas	4	Hebert Conceição (BRA); Euri Cedeño (DOM); Francisco Verón (ARG); Aaron Prince (TTO)
Olympic Qualifying Event – Asia/Oceania	5	Eumir Marcial (PHI); Abilkhan Amankul (KAZ); Ashish Kumar (IND); Tuohetaerbieke Tanglatihan (CHN); Shahin Mousavi (IRI)
Olympic Qualifying Event – Europe	6	Gleb Bakshi (ROC); Andrej Csemez (SVK); Arman Darchinyan (ARM); Oleksandr Khyzhniak (UKR); Vitali Bandarenka (BLR); Giorgi Kharabadze (GEO)
World Allocation	4	Kavuma David Ssemujju (UGA); Fanat Kakhramonov (UZB); Troy Isley (USA); Adam Chartoi (SWE)
Tripartite Invitation	1	Darrelle Valsaint (HAI)
Invitational place	1	Eldric Sella (EOR)
Total	25	

=== Light heavyweight (81 kg) ===
Competition	Places	Qualified boxer
Host Country	0	—
Olympic Qualifying Event – Africa	3	Abdelrahman Oraby (EGY); Mohammed Houmri (ALG); Mohamed Assaghir (MAR)
Olympic Qualifying Event – Americas	4	Arlen López (CUB); Keno Machado (BRA); Nalek Korbaj (VEN); Jorge Vivas (COL)
Olympic Qualifying Event – Asia/Oceania	5	Bekzad Nurdauletov (KAZ); Paulo Aokuso (AUS); Odai Al-Hindawi (JOR); Chen Daxiang (CHN); Shabbos Negmatulloev (TJK)
Olympic Qualifying Event – Europe	6	Benjamin Whittaker (GBR); Gazimagomed Jalidov (ESP); Luka Plantić (CRO); Loren Alfonso (AZE); Emmett Brennan (IRL); Imam Khataev (ROC)
World Allocation	4	Shakul Samed (GHA); Dilshodbek Ruzmetov (UZB); Rogelio Romero (MEX); Bayram Malkan (TUR)
Total	22	

=== Heavyweight (91 kg) ===
Competition	Places	Qualified boxer
Olympic Qualifying Event – Africa	2	Abdelhafid Benchabla (ALG); Youness Baalla (MAR)
Olympic Qualifying Event – Americas	3	Julio Castillo (ECU); Julio César La Cruz (CUB); Abner Teixeira (BRA)
Olympic Qualifying Event – Asia/Oceania	4	Vassiliy Levit (KAZ); David Nyika (NZL); Hussein Ishaish (JOR); Sanjar Tursunov (UZB)
Olympic Qualifying Event – Europe	4	Muslim Gadzhimagomedov (ROC); Cheavon Clarke (GBR); Ammar Abduljabbar (GER); Emmanuel Reyes (ESP)
World Allocation	4	Elly Ajowi Ochola (KEN); Ato Plodzicki-Faoagali (SAM); José María Lúcar (PER); Uladzislau Smiahlikau (BLR)
Total	17	

=== Super heavyweight (+91 kg) ===
Competition	Places	Qualified boxer
Olympic Qualifying Event – Africa	2	Maxime Yegnong (CMR); Chouaib Bouloudinat (ALG)
Olympic Qualifying Event – Americas	3	Dainier Peró (CUB); Richard Torrez (USA); Cristian Salcedo (COL)
Olympic Qualifying Event – Asia/Oceania	4	Bakhodir Jalolov (UZB); ~~Justis Huni (AUS)~~; ~~Leuila Mau'u (NZL)~~; Siyovush Zukhurov (TJK); Satish Kumar (IND); Kamshybek Kunkabayev (KAZ)
Olympic Qualifying Event – Europe	4	Ivan Veriasov (ROC); Mahammad Abdullayev (AZE); Frazer Clarke (GBR); Mourad Aliev (FRA)
World Allocation	4	Yousry Hafez (EGY); Danis Latypov (BRN); Ricardo Brown (JAM); Tsotne Rogava (UKR)
Total	17	

== Women's events ==
Olympic qualification system per continent and by weight category. The final list of qualifiers was announced on July 15, 2021.

Weight	Continental Qualifier				World Qualifier	Host Country**	TCI Places	Total Quota
Weight	Africa	Americas	AS & OC	Europe	World Qualifier	Host Country**	TCI Places	Total Quota
51 kg	3	4	6	6	5	0	1	25
57 kg	2	3	4	6	4	0	1	20
60 kg	2	3	4	6	4	0	1	20
69 kg	2	3	4	5	4	0	0	18
75 kg	2	3	4	4	4	0	0	17
Total	11	16	22	27	21	0	3	100

**Japan earned two quota places at the Asia/Oceania Olympic Qualifying Event, so the two Host Country quota places were reallocated to the World Ranking

=== Flyweight (51 kg) ===
Competition	Places	Qualified boxer
Olympic Qualifying Event – Africa	3	Roumaysa Boualam (ALG); Rabab Cheddar (MAR); Christine Ongare (KEN)
Olympic Qualifying Event – Americas	4	Ingrit Valencia (COL); Graziele Jesus (BRA); Virginia Fuchs (USA); Irismar Cardozo (VEN)
Olympic Qualifying Event – Asia/Oceania	6	Chang Yuan (CHN); Tsukimi Namiki (JPN); Mary Kom (IND); Huang Hsiao-wen (TPE); Irish Magno (PHI); Tursunoy Rakhimova (UZB)
Olympic Qualifying Event – Europe	6	Buse Naz Çakıroğlu (TUR); Charley Davison (GBR); Stoyka Krasteva (BUL); Giordana Sorrentino (ITA); Svetlana Soluianova (ROC); Sandra Drabik (POL)
World Allocation	5	Catherine Nanziri (UGA); ~~Chol Mi Pang (PRK)~~; Jutamas Jitpong (THA); Miguelina Hernández (DOM); Nina Radovanović (SRB); Nguyễn Thị Tâm (VIE)
Tripartite Invitation	1	Ornella Havyarimana (BDI)
CAS appeal	1	Mandy Bujold (CAN)
Total	26	

=== Featherweight (57 kg) ===
Competition	Places	Qualified boxer
Olympic Qualifying Event – Africa	2	Khouloud Hlimi (TUN); Keamogetse Kenosi (BOT)
Olympic Qualifying Event – Americas	3	Caroline Veyre (CAN); Yeni Arias (COL); Jucielen Romeu (BRA)
Olympic Qualifying Event – Asia/Oceania	4	Lin Yu-ting (TPE); Sena Irie (JPN); Skye Nicolson (AUS); Im Ae-ji (KOR)
Olympic Qualifying Event – Europe	6	Irma Testa (ITA); Stanimira Petrova (BUL); Michaela Walsh (IRL); Maria Nechita (ROU); Nikolina Ćaćić (CRO); Karriss Artingstall (GBR)
World Allocation	4	Marcelat Sakobi Matshu (COD); Nesthy Petecio (PHI); ~~Leonela Sánchez (ARG)~~; ~~Julianna Rodriguez (CRC)~~; Yamileth Solorzano (ESA); Liudmila Vorontsova (ROC)
Tripartite Invitation	1	Ramla Ali (SOM)
	1	Yarisel Ramirez (USA)
Total	21	

=== Lightweight (60 kg) ===
Competition	Places	Qualified boxer
Host Country	0	—
Olympic Qualifying Event – Africa	2	Imane Khelif (ALG); Mariem Homrani (TUN)
Olympic Qualifying Event – Americas	3	Beatriz Ferreira (BRA); Rashida Ellis (USA); Esmeralda Falcón (MEX)
Olympic Qualifying Event – Asia/Oceania	4	Oh Yeon-ji (KOR); Simranjit Kaur (IND); Sudaporn Seesondee (THA); Wu Shih-yi (TPE)
Olympic Qualifying Event – Europe	6	Caroline Dubois (GBR); Esra Yıldız (TUR); Agnes Alexiusson (SWE); Kellie Harrington (IRL); Rebecca Nicoli (ITA); Maïva Hamadouche (FRA)
World Allocation	4	Naomie Yumba (COD); Raykhona Kodirova (UZB); María José Palacios (ECU); Mira Potkonen (FIN)
Tripartite Invitation	1	Donjeta Sadiku (KOS)
	1	Dayana Sánchez (ARG)
Total	21	

=== Welterweight (69 kg) ===
Competition	Places	Qualified boxer
Host Country	0	—
Olympic Qualifying Event – Africa	2	Oumayma Bel Ahbib (MAR); Acinda Panguana (MOZ)
Olympic Qualifying Event – Americas	3	Oshae Jones (USA); Myriam da Silva (CAN); María Moronta (DOM)
Olympic Qualifying Event - Europe	5	Busenaz Sürmeneli (TUR); Angela Carini (ITA); Anna Lysenko (UKR); Nadine Apetz (GER); Saadat Dalgatova (ROC)
Olympic Qualifying Event – Asia/Oceania	4	Gu Hong (CHN); Chen Nien-chin (TPE); Lovlina Borgohain (IND); Baison Manikon (THA)
World Allocation	4	Elizabeth Akinyi (KEN); ~~Maftunakhton Melieva (UZB)~~; Shakhnoza Yunusova (UZB); Brianda Cruz (MEX); Karolina Koszewska (POL)
Total	18	

=== Middleweight (75 kg) ===
Competition	Places	Qualified boxer
Olympic Qualifying Event – Africa	2	Khadija El-Mardi (MAR); Rady Gramane (MOZ)
Olympic Qualifying Event – Americas	3	Tammara Thibeault (CAN); Naomi Graham (USA); Atheyna Bylon (PAN)
Olympic Qualifying Event – Asia/Oceania	4	Li Qian (CHN); Caitlin Parker (AUS); Pooja Rani (IND); Nadezhda Ryabets (KAZ)
Olympic Qualifying Event – Europe	4	Lauren Price (GBR); Zemfira Magomedalieva (ROC); Aoife O'Rourke (IRL); Nouchka Fontijn (NED)
World Allocation	4	Ichrak Chaib (ALG); Mönkhbatyn Myagmarjargal (MGL); Erika Pachito (ECU); Elżbieta Wójcik (POL)
Total	17	

Notes: Qualification System – EN (06 May 2021) - 4 quota places per category, 1 for each category per continent (in women's 51kg - 5 places).
