= 2020 Asia & Oceania Boxing Olympic Qualification Tournament =

Boxing competitions

- Venue: Prince Hamzah Sport Hall
- Location: Amman, Jordan
- Dates: 3–11 March
- Competitors: 221 from 35 nations

The 2020 Asia & Oceania Boxing Olympic Qualification Tournament for boxing at the 2020 Summer Olympics in Tokyo, Japan, were held from 3 to 11 March 2020 at the Prince Hamzah Sport Hall in Amman, Jordan.

The tournament was originally scheduled to be held in Wuhan, China from February 3–14, 2020 but was cancelled by local organizers amidst concerns over the COVID-19 pandemic, believed to have originated from the city. The qualifiers were moved to Jordan.

== Medalists ==
=== Men ===
Event	Gold	Silver	Bronze
−52 kg	Hu Jianguan (CHN)	Thitisan Panmot (THA)	Amit Panghal (IND)
−52 kg	Hu Jianguan (CHN)	Thitisan Panmot (THA)	Shakhobidin Zoirov (UZB)
−57 kg	Mirazizbek Mirzakhalilov (UZB)	Mohammad Al-Wadi (JOR)	Serik Temirzhanov (KAZ)
−57 kg	Mirazizbek Mirzakhalilov (UZB)	Mohammad Al-Wadi (JOR)	Nguyễn Văn Đương (VIE)
−63 kg	Elnur Abduraimov (UZB)	Zakir Safiullin (KAZ)	Baatarsükhiin Chinzorig (MGL)
−63 kg	Elnur Abduraimov (UZB)	Zakir Safiullin (KAZ)	Obada Al-Kasbeh (JOR)
−69 kg	Zeyad Ishaish (JOR)	Vikas Krishan Yadav (IND)	Bobo-Usmon Baturov (UZB)
−69 kg	Zeyad Ishaish (JOR)	Vikas Krishan Yadav (IND)	Ablaikhan Zhussupov (KAZ)
−75 kg	Eumir Marcial (PHI)	Abilkhan Amankul (KAZ)	Ashish Kumar (IND)
−75 kg	Eumir Marcial (PHI)	Abilkhan Amankul (KAZ)	Tuohetaerbieke Tanglatihan (CHN)
−81 kg	Bekzad Nurdauletov (KAZ)	Paulo Aokuso (AUS)	Odai Al-Hindawi (JOR)
−81 kg	Bekzad Nurdauletov (KAZ)	Paulo Aokuso (AUS)	Chen Daxiang (CHN)
−91 kg	Vassiliy Levit (KAZ)	David Nyika (NZL)	Hussein Ishaish (JOR)
−91 kg	Vassiliy Levit (KAZ)	David Nyika (NZL)	Sanjar Tursunov (UZB)
+91 kg	Bakhodir Jalolov (UZB)	Justis Huni (AUS)	Satish Kumar (IND)
+91 kg	Bakhodir Jalolov (UZB)	Justis Huni (AUS)	Kamshybek Kunkabayev (KAZ)

=== Women ===
Event	Gold	Silver	Bronze
−51 kg	Chang Yuan (CHN)	Tsukimi Namiki (JPN)	Mary Kom (IND)
−51 kg	Chang Yuan (CHN)	Tsukimi Namiki (JPN)	Huang Hsiao-wen (TPE)
−57 kg	Lin Yu-ting (TPE)	Sena Irie (JPN)	Skye Nicolson (AUS)
−57 kg	Lin Yu-ting (TPE)	Sena Irie (JPN)	Im Ae-ji (KOR)
−60 kg	Oh Yeon-ji (KOR)	Simranjit Kaur (IND)	Sudaporn Seesondee (THA)
−60 kg	Oh Yeon-ji (KOR)	Simranjit Kaur (IND)	Wu Shih-yi (TPE)
−69 kg	Gu Hong (CHN)	Chen Nien-chin (TPE)	Lovlina Borgohain (IND)
−69 kg	Gu Hong (CHN)	Chen Nien-chin (TPE)	Baison Manikon (THA)
−75 kg	Li Qian (CHN)	Caitlin Parker (AUS)	Pooja Rani (IND)
−75 kg	Li Qian (CHN)	Caitlin Parker (AUS)	Nadezhda Ryabets (KAZ)

== Qualification summary ==
NOC	Men								Women					Total
NOC	52	57	63	69	75	81	91	+91	51	57	60	69	75	Total
Australia	X					X		X		X			X	5
China	X				X	X			X			X	X	6
India	X		X	X	X			X	X		X	X	X	9
Iran		X			X									2
Japan				X					X	X				3
Jordan		X	X	X		X	X							5
Kazakhstan	X	X	X	X	X	X	X	X					X	9
Mongolia			X											1
New Zealand							X							1
Philippines					X				X					2
South Korea										X	X			2
Chinese Taipei									X	X	X	X		4
Tajikistan			X			X								2
Thailand	X	X									X	X		4
Uzbekistan	X	X	X	X			X	X	X					7
Vietnam		X												1
Total: 16 NOCs	6	6	6	5	5	5	4	4	6	4	4	4	4	63

== Results ==
=== Men ===
==== Flyweight (52 kg) ====
Seeds

1. (India) Amit Panghal (semifinals)
2. (Uzbekistan) Shakhobidin Zoirov (semifinals)
3. (South Korea) Kim In-kyu (round of 16)
4. (Kazakhstan) Saken Bibossinov (quarterfinals)

Preliminaries
	Score	
Kharkhüügiin Enkhmandakh (MGL)	RSC	Shukhrat Sabzaliev (TJK)
Ryomei Tanaka (JPN)	1–4	Azat Usenaliev (KGZ)
Tashi Wangdi (BHU)	0–5	Thitisan Panmot (THA)
Syed Muhammad Asif (PAK)	0–5	Aldoms Suguro (INA)

Round of 16
Amit Panghal (IND)	3
Kharkhüügiin Enkhmandakh (MGL)	2
Carlo Paalam (PHI)	5
Ramish Rahmani (AFG)	0
Hu Jianguan (CHN)	3
Tu Po-wei (TPE)	2
Azat Usenaliev (KGZ)	0
Saken Bibossinov (KAZ)	5
Kim In-kyu (KOR)	2
Thitisan Panmot (THA)	3
Alex Winwood (AUS)	5
Kanneth Tam (HKG)	0
Murtadha Al-Sudani (IRQ)	0
Omid Ahmadi Safa (IRI)	5
Aldoms Suguro (INA)	0
Shakhobidin Zoirov (UZB)	5

Quarterfinals
Amit Panghal (IND)	4
Carlo Paalam (PHI)	1
Hu Jianguan (CHN)	5
Saken Bibossinov (KAZ)	0
Thitisan Panmot (THA)	5
Alex Winwood (AUS)	0
Omid Ahmadi Safa (IRI)	0
Shakhobidin Zoirov (UZB)	5

Semifinals
Amit Panghal (IND)	2
Hu Jianguan (CHN)	3
Thitisan Panmot (THA)	4
Shakhobidin Zoirov (UZB)	1

Final
Hu Jianguan (CHN)	RSC
Thitisan Panmot (THA)

Olympic box-off
Carlo Paalam (PHI)	1
Saken Bibossinov (KAZ)	4
Alex Winwood (AUS)	3
Omid Ahmadi Safa (IRI)	2

==== Featherweight (57 kg) ====
Seeds

1. (Uzbekistan) Mirazizbek Mirzakhalilov (winner)
2. (Mongolia) Erdenebatyn Tsendbaatar (round of 16)
3. (Thailand) Chatchai-decha Butdee (quarterfinals)
4. (Papua New Guinea) Jamie Tumun Chang (round of 16)

Preliminaries
	Score	
Akylbek Esenbek Uulu (KGZ)	0–5	Gaurav Solanki (IND)
Danial Shahbakhsh (IRI)	5–0	Chen Po-yi (TPE)
Ian Clark Bautista (PHI)	3–2	Hayato Tsutsumi (JPN)
Chang Yong (CHN)	0–5	Ham Sang-myeong (KOR)

Round of 16
Mirazizbek Mirzakhalilov (UZB)	4
Gaurav Solanki (IND)	1
Bakhtovar Sagizov (TJK)	2
Rex Tso (HKG)	3
Serik Temirzhanov (KAZ)	5
Jaafar Al-Sudani (IRQ)	0
Danial Shahbakhsh (IRI)	RSC
Jamie Tumun Chang (PNG)
Chatchai-decha Butdee (THA)	5
Ian Clark Bautista (PHI)	0
Charlie Senior (AUS)
Nguyễn Văn Đương (VIE)	RSC
Mohammad Al-Wadi (JOR)	5
Lucky Mira Agusto Hari (INA)	0
Ham Sang-myeong (KOR)	4
Erdenebatyn Tsendbaatar (MGL)	1

Quarterfinals
Mirazizbek Mirzakhalilov (UZB)	5
Rex Tso (HKG)	0
Serik Temirzhanov (KAZ)	ABD
Danial Shahbakhsh (IRI)
Chatchai-decha Butdee (THA)
Nguyễn Văn Đương (VIE)	RSC
Mohammad Al-Wadi (JOR)	5
Ham Sang-myeong (KOR)	0

Semifinals
Mirazizbek Mirzakhalilov (UZB)	5
Serik Temirzhanov (KAZ)	0
Nguyễn Văn Đương (VIE)	2
Mohammad Al-Wadi (JOR)	3

Final
Mirazizbek Mirzakhalilov (UZB)	5
Mohammad Al-Wadi (JOR)	0

Olympic box-off
Rex Tso (HKG)	0
Danial Shahbakhsh (IRI)	5
Chatchai-decha Butdee (THA)	5
Ham Sang-myeong (KOR)	0

==== Lightweight (63 kg) ====
Seeds

1. (Tajikistan) Bakhodur Usmonov (quarterfinals)
2. (Australia) Harrison Garside (quarterfinals)
3. (Mongolia) Baatarsükhiin Chinzorig (semifinals)
4. (Kazakhstan) Zakir Safiullin (second place)

Preliminaries
	Score	
Argen Kadyrbek Uulu (KGZ)	0–5	Sanil Shahi (NEP)
Waheed Abdul-Ridha (IRQ)	RSC	Shan Jun (CHN)
John Ume (PNG)	RSC	Nassim Saddiq (KSA)
Jone Koroilagilagi Davule (FIJ)	0–5	Atichai Phoemsap (THA)

Round of 16
Bakhodur Usmonov (TJK)	5
Sanil Shahi (NEP)	0
Obada Al-Kasbeh (JOR)	4
Daisuke Narimatsu (JPN)	1
Lee Jong-seung (KOR)	1
Ashkan Rezaei (IRI)	4
Shan Jun (CHN)	1
Zakir Safiullin (KAZ)	4
Baatarsükhiin Chinzorig (MGL)	5
John Ume (PNG)	0
Manish Kaushik (IND)	5
Lai Chu-en (TPE)	0
James Palicte (PHI)	0
Elnur Abduraimov (UZB)	5
Atichai Phoemsap (THA)	1
Harrison Garside (AUS)	4

Quarterfinals
Bakhodur Usmonov (TJK)	0
Obada Al-Kasbeh (JOR)	5
Ashkan Rezaei (IRI)	0
Zakir Safiullin (KAZ)	5
Baatarsükhiin Chinzorig (MGL)	3
Manish Kaushik (IND)	2
Elnur Abduraimov (UZB)	4
Harrison Garside (AUS)	1

Semifinals
Obada Al-Kasbeh (JOR)	2
Zakir Safiullin (KAZ)	3
Baatarsükhiin Chinzorig (MGL)	2
Elnur Abduraimov (UZB)	3

Final
Zakir Safiullin (KAZ)	2
Elnur Abduraimov (UZB)	3

Olympic box-off
Bakhodur Usmonov (TJK)	5
Ashkan Rezaei (IRI)	0
Manish Kaushik (IND)	4
Harrison Garside (AUS)	1

==== Welterweight (69 kg) ====
Seeds

1. (Uzbekistan) Bobo-Usmon Baturov (semifinals)
2. (Kazakhstan) Ablaikhan Zhussupov (semifinals)
3. (Japan) Sewon Okazawa (quarterfinals)
4. (Jordan) Zeyad Ishaish (winner)

Preliminaries
	Score	
Ka Wa Chan (HKG)	0–5	Dominic Roe (NZL)
Marion Faustino Ah Tong (SAM)	5–0	Winston Hill (FIJ)
Sahm Kadhim Karrar Al-Ezairej (IRQ)	2–3	Jason Mallia (AUS)
Pan Hung-ming (TPE)	5–0	Dinesh Pathirage Maduranga (SRI)
Nursultan Mamataly (KGZ)	RSC-I	Sherali Mamadaliev (TJK)
Lim Hyun-chul (KOR)	0–5	Wuttichai Masuk (THA)
Battömöriin Misheelt (MGL)	5–0	Thulasimmaran Tharumalingam (QAT)

Round of 16
Bobo-Usmon Baturov (UZB)	5
Dominic Roe (NZL)	0
Gul Zaib (PAK)	0
Maimaitituersun Qiong (CHN)	5
Sajjad Kazemzadeh (IRI)	2
Marion Faustino Ah Tong (SAM)	3
Jason Mallia (AUS)	0
Zeyad Ishaish (JOR)	5
Sewon Okazawa (JPN)	5
Pan Hung-ming (TPE)	0
Nursultan Mamataly (KGZ)	0
Vikas Krishan Yadav (IND)	5
Abdulla Hemrat (BHR)
Wuttichai Masuk (THA)	ABD
Battömöriin Misheelt (MGL)	0
Ablaikhan Zhussupov (KAZ)	5

Quarterfinals
Bobo-Usmon Baturov (UZB)	5
Maimaitituersun Qiong (CHN)	0
Marion Faustino Ah Tong (SAM)	0
Zeyad Ishaish (JOR)	5
Sewon Okazawa (JPN)	0
Vikas Krishan Yadav (IND)	5
Wuttichai Masuk (THA)	0
Ablaikhan Zhussupov (KAZ)	5

Semifinals
Bobo-Usmon Baturov (UZB)	2
Zeyad Ishaish (JOR)	3
Vikas Krishan Yadav (IND)	3
Ablaikhan Zhussupov (KAZ)	2

Final
Zeyad Ishaish (JOR)	WO
Vikas Krishan Yadav (IND)

Semifinals		Olympic box-off
Maimaitituersun Qiong (CHN)	5
Marion Faustino Ah Tong (SAM)	0	Maimaitituersun Qiong (CHN)	0
Sewon Okazawa (JPN)	4	Sewon Okazawa (JPN)	5
Wuttichai Masuk (THA)	1

==== Middleweight (75 kg) ====
Seeds

1. (Philippines) Eumir Marcial (winner)
2. (Iran) Shahin Mousavi (quarterfinals)
3. (Samoa) Jancen Poutoa (round of 16)
4. (Kyrgyzstan) Omurbek Bekzhigit Uulu (round of 16)

Preliminaries
	Score	
Kirra Ruston (AUS)	RSC	Kan Leong Tai (HKG)
Ahmad Ghossoun (SYR)	5–0	Wanni Arachchige Rumesh Sandakelum (SRI)
Maikhel Roberrd Muskita (INA)	5–0	Siaosi George Tanoa (ASA)
Kan Chia-wei (TPE)	0–5	Ashish Kumar (IND)
Hisham Simreen (JOR)	0–5	Fanat Kakhramonov (UZB)
Kim Jin-jea (KOR)	4–1	Bakhtiyor Mirzomuhammad (TJK)
Tuohetaerbieke Tanglatihan (CHN)	5–0	Mahmood-ul Hassan (PAK)
Muntadher Al-Farttoosi (IRQ)	0–5	Yuito Moriwaki (JPN)

Round of 16
Eumir Marcial (PHI)	5
Kirra Ruston (AUS)	0
Ahmad Ghossoun (SYR)	0
Otgonbaataryn Byamba-Erdene (MGL)	5
Ryan Scaife (NZL)	2
Maikhel Roberrd Muskita (INA)	3
Ashish Kumar (IND)	5
Omurbek Bekzhigit Uulu (KGZ)	0
Jancen Poutoa (SAM)	0
Fanat Kakhramonov (UZB)	5
Kim Jin-jea (KOR)	0
Abilkhan Amankul (KAZ)	5
Weerapon Jongjoho (THA)
Tuohetaerbieke Tanglatihan (CHN)	KO
Yuito Moriwaki (JPN)	0
Shahin Mousavi (IRI)	5

Quarterfinals
Eumir Marcial (PHI)	RSC
Otgonbaataryn Byamba-Erdene (MGL)
Maikhael Roberrd Muskita (INA)	0
Ashish Kumar (IND)	5
Fanat Kakhramonov (UZB)	0
Abilkhan Amankul (KAZ)	5
Tuohetaerbieke Tanglatihan (CHN)	3
Shahin Mousavi (IRI)	2

Semifinals
Eumir Marcial (PHI)	4
Ashish Kumar (IND)	1
Abilkhan Amankul (KAZ)	3
Tuohetaerbieke Tanglatihan (CHN)	2

Final
Eumir Marcial (PHI)	3
Abilkhan Amankul (KAZ)	2

Semifinals		Olympic box-off
Otgonbaataryn Byamba-Erdene (MGL)	5
Maikhael Roberrd Muskita (INA)	0	Otgonbaataryn Byamba-Erdene (MGL)	1
Fanat Kakhramonov (UZB)	1	Shahin Mousavi (IRI)	4
Shahin Mousavi (IRI)	4

==== Light heavyweight (81 kg) ====
Seeds

1. (Kazakhstan) Bekzad Nurdauletov (winner)
2. (Uzbekistan) Dilshodbek Ruzmetov (round of 16)
3. (Kyrgyzstan) Erkin Adylbek Uulu (round of 16)
4. (American Samoa) Jolando Taala (round of 16)

Preliminaries
	Score	
Jerome Pampellone (NZL)	4–1	Ren Umemura (JPN)
Chen Daxiang (CHN)	5–0	Ehsan Rouzbahani (IRI)
Navosa Ioata (TUV)	0–5	Paulo Aokuso (AUS)

Round of 16
Bekzad Nurdauletov (KAZ)	5
Jerome Pampellone (NZL)	0
Faizullah Aryubi (AFG)	0
Shabbos Negmatulloev (TJK)	5
Jakkapong Yomkhot (THA)	4
Hong In-gi (KOR)	1
Odai Al-Hindawi (JOR)	5
Jolando Taala (ASA)	0
Erkin Adylbek Uulu (KGZ)	0
Chen Daxiang (CHN)	5
Dee Ioapo (SAM)	0
Sachin Kumar (IND)	5
Narmandakhyn Shinebayar (MGL)	1
Nguyễn Mạnh Cường (VIE)	4
Paulo Aokuso (AUS)	3
Dilshodbek Ruzmetov (UZB)	2

Quarterfinals
Bekzad Nurdauletov (KAZ)	5
Shabbos Negmatulloev (TJK)	0
Jakkapong Yomkhot (THA)	0
Odai Al-Hindawi (JOR)	5
Chen Daxiang (CHN)	3
Sachin Kumar (IND)	2
Nguyễn Mạnh Cường (VIE)	0
Paulo Aokuso (AUS)	5

Semifinals
Bekzad Nurdauletov (KAZ)	5
Odai Al-Hindawi (JOR)	0
Chen Daxiang (CHN)	0
Paulo Aokuso (AUS)	5

Final
Bekzad Nurdauletov (KAZ)	5
Paulo Aokuso (AUS)	0

Semifinals		Olympic box-off
Shabbos Negmatulloev (TJK)	5
Jakkapong Yomkhot (THA)	0	Shabbos Negmatulloev (TJK)	5
Sachin Kumar (IND)	4	Sachin Kumar (IND)	0
Nguyễn Mạnh Cường (VIE)	1

==== Heavyweight (91 kg) ====
Seeds

1. (Kazakhstan) Vassiliy Levit (winner)
2. (New Zealand) David Nyika (second place)
3. (Uzbekistan) Sanjar Tursunov (semifinals)
4. (Jordan) Hussein Ishaish (semifinals)

Round of 16
Davlat Boltaev (TJK)	5
Sandagsürengiin Erdenebayar (MGL)	0
Brandon Rees (AUS)	1
Ato Plodzicki-Faoagali (SAM)	4
Kim Hyeong-kyu (KOR)	0
Hussein Ishaish (JOR)	5
Sanjar Tursunov (UZB)	5
Saadi Rabeah (IRQ)	0
Han Xuezhen (CHN)	1
Toufan Sharifi (IRI)	4
Naman Tanwar (IND)	0
Alaa Aldin Ghousoon (SYR)	5

Quarterfinals
Vassiliy Levit (KAZ)	5
Davlat Boltaev (TJK)	0
Ato Plodzicki-Faoagali (SAM)
Hussein Ishaish (JOR)	RSC
Sanjar Tursunov (UZB)	5
Toufan Sharifi (IRI)	0
Alaa Aldin Ghousoon (SYR)	0
David Nyika (NZL)	5

Semifinals
Vassiliy Levit (KAZ)	4
Hussein Ishaish (JOR)	1
Sanjar Tursunov (UZB)	0
David Nyika (NZL)	5

Final
Vassiliy Levit (KAZ)	4
David Nyika (NZL)	1

==== Super heavyweight (+91 kg) ====
Seeds

1. (Uzbekistan) Bakhodir Jalolov (winner)
2. (Kazakhstan) Kamshybek Kunkabayev (semifinals)
3. (Australia) Justis Huni (second place)
4. (India) Satish Kumar (semifinals)

Round of 16
Danis Latypov (BHR)	RSC
Song Hwa-pyeong (KOR)
Siyovush Zukhurov (TJK)	0
Leuila Mau'u (NZL)	5
Iman Ramezanpour (IRI)	0
Aihemaiti Maimaiti (CHN)	5

Quarterfinals
Bakhodir Jalolov (UZB)	5
Danis Latypov (BHR)	0
Daiviin Otgonbayar (MGL)	0
Satish Kumar (IND)	5
Justis Huni (AUS)	5
Leuila Mau'u (NZL)	0
Aihemaiti Maimaiti (CHN)	0
Kamshybek Kunkabayev (KAZ)	5

Semifinals
Bakhodir Jalolov (UZB)	5
Satish Kumar (IND)	0
Justis Huni (AUS)	WO
Kamshybek Kunkabayev (KAZ)

Final
Bakhodir Jalolov (UZB)	5
Justis Huni (AUS)	0

=== Women ===
==== Flyweight (51 kg) ====
Seeds

1. (Chinese Taipei) Huang Hsiao-wen (semifinals)
2. (India) Mary Kom (semifinals)
3. (Vietnam) Nguyễn Thị Tâm (round of 16)
4. (Japan) Tsukimi Namiki (second place)

Round of 16
Huang Hsiao-wen (TPE)	5
Kristy Harris (AUS)	0
Jung Joo-hyung (KOR)	0
Tursunoy Rakhimova (UZB)	5
Angelina Lukas (KAZ)	1
Jutamas Jitpong (THA)	4
Lutsaikhany Altantsetseg (MGL)	0
Tsukimi Namiki (JPN)	5
Nguyễn Thị Tâm (VIE)	0
Chang Yuan (CHN)	4
Sumaiya Qosimova (TJK)	5
Reem Al-Mriheel (JOR)	0
Winnie Au (HKG)
Irish Magno (PHI)	RSC
Tasmyn Benny (NZL)	0
Mary Kom (IND)	5

Quarterfinals
Huang Hsiao-wen (TPE)	4
Tursunoy Rakhimova (UZB)	1
Jutamas Jitpong (THA)	0
Tsukimi Namiki (JPN)	5
Chang Yuan (CHN)	5
Sumaiya Qosimova (TJK)	0
Irish Magno (PHI)	0
Mary Kom (IND)	5

Semifinals
Huang Hsiao-wen (TPE)
Tsukimi Namiki (JPN)	ABD
Chang Yuan (CHN)	5
Mary Kom (IND)	0

Final
Tsukimi Namiki (JPN)	2
Chang Yuan (CHN)	3

Olympic box-off
Tursunoy Rakhimova (UZB)	4
Jutamas Jitpong (THA)	1
Sumaiya Qosimova (TJK)	0
Irish Magno (PHI)	5

==== Featherweight (57 kg) ====
Seeds

1. (Philippines) Nesthy Petecio (quarterfinals)
2. (Chinese Taipei) Lin Yu-ting (winner)
3. (Australia) Skye Nicolson (semifinals)
4. (Thailand) Nilawan Techasuep (round of 16)

Preliminaries
	Score	
Krismi Lankapurayalage (SRI)	4–1	Silpa Lau Ratu (INA)
Yodgoroy Mirzaeva (UZB)	5–0	Jennifer Chieng (FSM)

Round of 16
Nesthy Petecio (PHI)	5
Krismi Lankapurayalage (SRI)	0
Amy Andrew (NZL)	0
Sena Irie (JPN)	5
Im Ae-ji (KOR)	5
Minu Gurung (NPL)	0
Sakshi Chaudhary (IND)	4
Nilawan Techasuep (THA)	1
Skye Nicolson (AUS)	5
Mijgona Samadova (TJK)	0
Tömörkhuyagiin Bolortuul (MGL)	RSC
Flora Kilasa Loga (PNG)
Yin Junhua (CHN)	5
Dametken Kelimbet (KAZ)	0
Yodgoroy Mirzaeva (UZB)	0
Lin Yu-ting (TPE)	5

Quarterfinals
Nesthy Petecio (PHI)	1
Sena Irie (JPN)	4
Im Ae-ji (KOR)	5
Sakshi Chaudhary (IND)	0
Skye Nicolson (AUS)	5
Tömörkhuyagiin Bolortuul (MGL)	0
Yin Junhua (CHN)	0
Lin Yu-ting (TPE)	5

Semifinals
Sena Irie (JPN)	5
Im Ae-ji (KOR)	0
Skye Nicolson (AUS)	0
Lin Yu-ting (TPE)	5

Final
Sena Irie (JPN)	0
Lin Yu-ting (TPE)	5

==== Lightweight (60 kg) ====
Seeds

1. (Australia) Anja Stridsman (quarterfinals)
2. (Mongolia) Monkhoryn Namuun (quarterfinals)
3. (Chinese Taipei) Wu Shih-yi (semifinals)
4. (China) Yang Wenlu (round of 16)

Round of 16
Oh Yeon-ji (KOR)	5
Shoira Zulkaynarova (TJK)	0
Troy Garton (NZL)	2
Raykhona Kodirova (UZB)	3
Sudaporn Seesondee (THA)	3
Yang Wenlu (CHN)	2
Saya Hamamoto (JPN)	2
Riza Pasuit (PHI)	3
Rimma Volossenko (KAZ)	0
Simranjit Kaur (IND)	5

Quarterfinals
Anja Stridsman (AUS)	0
Oh Yeon-ji (KOR)	5
Raykhona Kodirova (UZB)	0
Sudaporn Seesondee (THA)	5
Wu Shih-yi (TPE)	5
Riza Pasuit (PHI)	0
Simranjit Kaur (IND)	5
Monkhoryn Namuun (MGL)	0

Semifinals
Oh Yeon-ji (KOR)	5
Sudaporn Seesondee (THA)	0
Wu Shih-yi (TPE)	2
Simranjit Kaur (IND)	3

Final
Oh Yeon-ji (KOR)	5
Simranjit Kaur (IND)	0

==== Welterweight (69 kg) ====
Seeds

1. (Chinese Taipei) Chen Nien-chin (second place)
2. (India) Lovlina Borgohain (semifinals)
3. (China) Gu Hong (winner)
4. (Australia) Kaye Scott (quarterfinals)

Round of 16
Uranbilegiin Shinetsetseg (MGL)	3
Ariane Nicholson (NZL)	2
Baison Manikon (THA)	5
Nilufar Boboyorova (TJK)	0
Valentina Khalzova (KAZ)	5
Choi Su-yeon (KOR)	0
Mai Kito (JPN)	1
Maftunakhon Melieva (UZB)	4

Quarterfinals
Chen Nien-chin (TPE)	5
Uranbilegiin Shinetsetseg (MGL)	0
Baison Manikon (THA)	3
Kaye Scott (AUS)	2
Gu Hong (CHN)	5
Valentina Khalzova (KAZ)	0
Maftunakhon Melieva (UZB)	0
Lovlina Borgohain (IND)	5

Semifinals
Chen Nien-chin (TPE)	5
Baison Manikon (THA)	0
Gu Hong (CHN)	5
Lovlina Borgohain (IND)	0

Final
Chen Nien-chin (TPE)	2
Gu Hong (CHN)	3

==== Middleweight (75 kg) ====
Seeds

1. (China) Li Qian (winner)
2. (Australia) Caitlin Parker (second place)
3. (Vietnam) Nguyễn Thị Hương (quarterfinals)
4. (India) Pooja Rani (semifinals)

Round of 16
Wu Pei-yi (TPE)	0
Mönkhbatyn Myagmarjargal (MGL)	5
Nadezhda Ryabets (KAZ)	3
Navbakhor Khamidova (UZB)	2
Arisa Tsubata (JPN)	0
Seong Su-yeon (KOR)	5

Quarterfinals
Li Qian (CHN)	5
Mönkhbatyn Myagmarjargal (MGL)	0
Pornnipa Chutee (THA)	0
Pooja Rani (IND)	5
Nguyễn Thị Hương (VIE)	0
Nadezhda Ryabets (KAZ)	5
Seong Su-yeon (KOR)	0
Caitlin Parker (AUS)	5

Semifinals
Li Qian (CHN)	5
Pooja Rani (IND)	0
Nadezhda Ryabets (KAZ)	0
Caitlin Parker (AUS)	5

Final
Li Qian (CHN)	5
Caitlin Parker (AUS)	0
