= 2019 AIBA World Boxing Championships – Welterweight =

Welterweight at the 2019 AIBA World Boxing Championships
- Venue: Ekaterinburg Expo
- Location: Yekaterinburg, Russia
- Dates: 13–21 September
- Competitors: 51 from 51 nations

Medalists
gold medal	Andrey Zamkovoy	Russia
silver medal	Pat McCormack	England
bronze medal	Ablaikhan Zhussupov	Kazakhstan
bronze medal	Bobo-Usmon Baturov	Uzbekistan

The Welterweight competition at the 2019 AIBA World Boxing Championships was held from 13 to 21 September 2019.

== Schedule ==
The schedule was as follows:

Date	Time	Round
Friday 13 September 2019	15:00	First round
Monday 16 September 2019	15:00	Second round
Tuesday 17 September 2019	20:00	Third round
Wednesday 18 September 2019	19:30	Quarterfinals
Friday 20 September 2019	19:30	Semifinals
Saturday 21 September 2019	19:15	Final

All times are Yekaterinburg Time (UTC+5)

== Results ==
=== Finals ===
Semi-finals
(Russia) Andrey Zamkovoy	5
(Kazakhstan) Ablaikhan Zhussupov	0
(Uzbekistan) Bobo-Usmon Baturov	0
(England) Pat McCormack	5

Final
(Russia) Andrey Zamkovoy	4
(England) Pat McCormack	0

=== Top half ===
==== Section 1 ====
First round
(Egypt) Mohamed Hikal	0
(China) Maimaitituersun Qiong	5
(Turkmenistan) Serdar Amangeldiýew	1
(Netherlands) Delano James	4
(Iraq) Karrar Aal-Ezirej	0
(Turkey) Necat Ekinci	5
(Canada) Wyatt Sanford	5
(Moldova) Nicolae Bucșa	0
(Belgium) Nabil Messaoudi	5
(Democratic Republic of the Congo) Idriss Kapenga	0

Second round
(Cuba) Roniel Iglesias	5
(China) Maimaitituersun Qiong	0
(Netherlands) Delano James	0
(Turkey) Necat Ekinci	5
(Hungary) László Kozák	2
(Canada) Wyatt Sanford	3
(Belgium) Nabil Messaoudi
(Russia) Andrey Zamkovoy	KO

Third round
(Cuba) Roniel Iglesias	5
(Turkey) Necat Ekinci	0
(Canada) Wyatt Sanford	0
(Russia) Andrey Zamkovoy	5

Quarterfinals
(Cuba) Roniel Iglesias	1
(Russia) Andrey Zamkovoy	4

==== Section 2 ====
First round
(Morocco) Zine El Abidine	RSC
(Sudan) Ahmed Abdelrahman
(Qatar) Thulasi Tharumalingam	1
(South Korea) Lim Hyun-chul	4
(Trinidad and Tobago) Tyron Thomas	0
(Germany) Nick Bier	5
(Thailand) Wuttichai Masuk	4
(Belarus) Yauheni Dauhaliavets	1

Second round
(Dominican Republic) Rohan Polanco	4
(Morocco) Zine El Abidine	1
(South Korea) Lim Hyun-chul	0
(Poland) Filip Wąchała	5
(Sweden) Billy Liljeqvist	0
(Germany) Nick Bier	4
(Thailand) Wuttichai Masuk	0
(Kazakhstan) Ablaikhan Zhussupov	5

Third round
(Dominican Republic) Rohan Polanco	5
(Poland) Filip Wąchała	0
(Germany) Nick Bier	0
(Kazakhstan) Ablaikhan Zhussupov	5

Quarterfinals
(Dominican Republic) Rohan Polanco	0
(Kazakhstan) Ablaikhan Zhussupov	5

=== Bottom half ===
==== Section 3 ====
First round
(Argentina) Brian Arregui	5
(Monaco) Hugo Micallef	0
(Italy) Gianluigi Malanga	4
(Estonia) Pavel Kamanin	0
(United States) Delante Johnson	3
(Brazil) Luiz Da Silva	2
(Ukraine) Mger Oganisian	2
(Chinese Taipei) Pan Hung-ming	3
(Armenia) Koryun Astoyan	1
(India) Duryodhan Negi	4

Second round
(Uzbekistan) Bobo-Usmon Baturov	5
(Argentina) Brian Arregui	0
(Italy) Gianluigi Malanga
(United States) Delante Johnson	w/o
(Mongolia) Ganbaataryn Bayarkhüü	5
(Chinese Taipei) Pan Hung-ming	0
(India) Duryodhan Negi	1
(Jordan) Zeyad Eashash	4

Third round
(Uzbekistan) Bobo-Usmon Baturov	5
(United States) Delante Johnson	0
(Mongolia) Ganbaataryn Bayarkhüü	0
(Jordan) Zeyad Eashash	5

Quarterfinals
(Uzbekistan) Bobo-Usmon Baturov	5
(Jordan) Zeyad Eashash	0

==== Section 4 ====
First round
(Croatia) Marko Zeljko	0
(France) Wahid Hambli	5
(Azerbaijan) Lorenzo Sotomayor	3
(Australia) Jason Mallia	2
(Iran) Sajjad Kazemzadeh	0
(Georgia (country)) Lasha Guruli	5
(Serbia) Milan Vranković	1
(Kyrgyzstan) Abdurakhman Abdurakhmanov	4
(Israel) Miroslav Kapuler	1
(Republic of Ireland) Aidan Walsh	4

Second round
(Japan) Sewon Okazawa	4
(France) Wahid Hambli	1
(Azerbaijan) Lorenzo Sotomayor	2
(Algeria) Chemseddine Kramou	3
(Georgia (country)) Lasha Guruli	5
(Kyrgyzstan) Abdurakhman Abdurakhmanov	0
(Republic of Ireland) Aidan Walsh	2
(England) Pat McCormack	3

Third round
(Japan) Sewon Okazawa	5
(Algeria) Chemseddine Kramou	0
(Georgia (country)) Lasha Guruli	0
(England) Pat McCormack	5

Quarterfinals
(Japan) Sewon Okazawa	2
(England) Pat McCormack	3
