= Boxing at the 2020 Summer Olympics – Men's light heavyweight =

Men's light heavyweight at the Games of the XXXII Olympiad
- Boxing pictogram
- Venue: Ryōgoku Kokugikan
- Dates: 25 July 2021; 4 August 2021
- Competitors: 22 from 22 nations

Medalists
1st place, gold medalist(s)		Arlen López	Cuba
2nd place, silver medalist(s)		Benjamin Whittaker	Great Britain
3rd place, bronze medalist(s)		Imam Khataev	ROC
3rd place, bronze medalist(s)		Loren Alfonso	Azerbaijan

The men's light heavyweight boxing event at the 2020 Summer Olympics took place between 25 July and 4 August 2021 at the Ryōgoku Kokugikan. 22 boxers from 22 nations competed.

== Background ==
This was the 24th appearance of the men's light heavyweight event. The event was not held in 1904 or 1908, but has been on the Olympic programme at every Summer Games since being introduced in 1920 (that is, excluding 1912) since. The light heavyweight class is the class with the longest history at one weight range; it has been at the 75–81 kg range since the 1952 Games.

Reigning World Champion Bekzad Nurdauletov of Kazakhstan had qualified for the Games. The 2016 Olympic champion, Julio César La Cruz, had moved up to the heavyweight class for the 2020 Games. The 2016 Olympic champion in middleweight, Arlen López (also of Cuba), had moved up to light heavyweight and was competing in Tokyo.

== Qualification ==
A National Olympic Committee (NOC) could enter only 1 qualified boxer in the weight class. There were 22 quota places available for the men's light heavyweight, allocated as follows:

- 3 places at the 2020 African Boxing Olympic Qualification Tournament.
- 5 places at the 2020 Asia & Oceania Boxing Olympic Qualification Tournament.
- 6 places at the 2020 European Boxing Olympic Qualification Tournament.
- 4 places that were intended to be awarded at the 2021 Pan American Boxing Olympic Qualification Tournament, which was cancelled. These places were instead awarded through the world ranking list to the top boxers from the Americas who had been registered for the qualification tournament.
- 4 places that were intended to be awarded at a World Olympic Qualifying Tournament, which was cancelled. These places were instead awarded through the world ranking list, with one place for each continental zone (Africa, Asia & Oceania, Europe, Americas).

No host places or Tripartite Commission invitation places were reserved for the men's light heavyweight.

== Competition format ==
Like all Olympic boxing events, the competition is a straight single-elimination tournament. The competition begins with a preliminary round, where the number of competitors is reduced to 16, and concludes with a final. As there are fewer than 32 boxers in the competition, a number of boxers will receive a bye through the preliminary round. Both semifinal losers are awarded bronze medals.

Bouts consist of three three-minute rounds with a one-minute break between rounds. A boxer may win by knockout or by points. Scoring is on the "10-point-must" system, with 5 judges scoring each round. Judges consider "number of blows landed on the target areas, domination of the bout, technique and tactical superiority and competitiveness." Each judge determines a winner for each round, who receives 10 points for the round, and assigns the round's loser a number of points between 7 and 9 based on performance. The judge's scores for each round are added to give a total score for that judge. The boxer with the higher score from a majority of the judges is the winner.

== Schedule ==
The light heavyweight starts with the round of 32 on 25 July. There are two rest days before the round of 16 on 28 July. For the next two rounds, there is only one rest for each, with the quarterfinals on 30 July and the semifinals on 1 August. The finalists get two rest days before competing on 4 August.

Legend

R32	Round of 32	R16	Round of 16	QF	Quarterfinals	SF	Semifinals	F	Final

Date	Jul 24		Jul 25		Jul 26		Jul 27		Jul 28		Jul 29		Jul 30		Jul 31		Aug 1		Aug 2		Aug 3		Aug 4		Aug 5		Aug 6		Aug 7		Aug 8	
Event	A	E	A	E	A	E	A	E	A	E	A	E	A	E	A	E	A	E	A	E	A	E	A	E	A	E	A	E	A	E	A	E
Men's light heavyweight			R32						R16				QF				SF						F									

== Results ==
=== Finals ===
Final
Benjamin Whittaker (GBR)	1
Arlen López (CUB)	4

=== Top half ===
Round of 32
Mohamed Assaghir (MAR)
Imam Khataev (ROC)	RSC
Shabbos Negmatulloev (TJK)	0
Chen Daxiang (CHN)	4
Jorge Vivas (COL)	1
Benjamin Whittaker (GBR)	4

Round of 16
Bekzad Nurdauletov (KAZ)	1
Imam Khataev (ROC)	4
Gazimagomed Jalidov (ESP)	3
Paulo Aokuso (AUS)	2
Keno Machado (BRA)	5
Chen Daxiang (CHN)	0
Benjamin Whittaker (GBR)	5
Abdelrahman Oraby (EGY)	0

Quarterfinals
Imam Khataev (ROC)	KO
Gazimagomed Jalidov (ESP)
Keno Machado (BRA)	2
Benjamin Whittaker (GBR)	3

Semifinals
Imam Khataev (ROC)	1
Benjamin Whittaker (GBR)	4

=== Bottom half ===
Round of 32
Mohammed Houmri (ALG)	3
Nalek Korbaj (VEN)	2
Luka Plantić (CRO)	3
Odai Al-Hindawi (JOR)	2
Emmett Brennan (IRL)	0
Dilshodbek Ruzmetov (UZB)	5

Round of 16
Arlen López (CUB)	5
Mohammed Houmri (ALG)	0
Luka Plantić (CRO)	1
Rogelio Romero (MEX)	4
Shakul Samed (GHA)
Bayram Malkan (TUR)	RSC
Dilshodbek Ruzmetov (UZB)	1
Loren Alfonso (AZE)	4

Quarterfinals
Arlen López (CUB)	5
Rogelio Romero (MEX)	0
Bayram Malkan (TUR)	0
Loren Alfonso (AZE)	5

Semifinals
Arlen López (CUB)	5
Loren Alfonso (AZE)	0
