= Kazakhstan at the 2020 Summer Olympics =

- IOC code: KAZ
- NOC: National Olympic Committee of the Republic of Kazakhstan
- Website: www.olympic.kz (in Kazakh, Russian, and English)

in Tokyo, Japan July 23, 2021 – August 8, 2021
- Competitors: 94 in 20 sports
- Flag bearers (opening): Kamshybek Kunkabayev; Olga Rypakova
- Flag bearer (closing): Kamshybek Kunkabayev
- Medals Ranked 83rd: Gold 0 Silver 0 Bronze 8 Total 8

Summer Olympics appearances (overview)
- 1996; 2000; 2004; 2008; 2012; 2016; 2020; 2024

Other related appearances
- Russian Empire (1900–1912); Soviet Union (1952–1988); Unified Team (1992)

Kazakhstan competed at the 2020 Summer Olympics in Tokyo. Originally scheduled to take place from 24 July to 9 August 2020, the Games were postponed to 23 July to 8 August 2021, because of the COVID-19 pandemic. It was the nation's seventh consecutive appearance at the Summer Olympics in the post-Soviet era, and it was the nation's least successful Olympic Games.

== Medalists ==
Medal	Name	Sport	Event	Date
Bronze	Yeldos Smetov	Judo	Men's 60 kg	24 July
Bronze	Igor Son	Weightlifting	Men's 61 kg	25 July
Bronze	Zulfiya Chinshanlo	Weightlifting	Women's 55 kg	26 July
Bronze	Kamshybek Kunkabayev	Boxing	Men's super heavyweight	4 August
Bronze	Saken Bibossinov	Boxing	Men's flyweight	5 August
Bronze	Nurislam Sanayev	Wrestling	Men's freestyle 57 kg	5 August
Bronze	Darkhan Assadilov	Karate	Men's kumite 67 kg	5 August
Bronze	Sofya Berultseva	Karate	Women's kumite +61 kg	7 August

== Competitors ==
The following is the list of number of competitors participating in the Games:

Sport	Men	Women	Total
Archery	3	0	3
Artistic swimming	—N/a	2	2
Athletics	2	7	9
Boxing	8	1	9
Canoeing	3	4	7
Cycling	5	0	5
Fencing	1	0	1
Gymnastics	1	1	2
Judo	5	1	6
Karate	3	2	5
Modern pentathlon	1	1	2
Rowing	1	0	1
Shooting	1	2	3
Sport climbing	1	0	1
Swimming	1	0	1
Table tennis	1	1	2
Taekwondo	1	1	2
Tennis	3	4	7
Water polo	13	0	13
Weightlifting	1	1	2
Wrestling	8	3	11
Total	63	31	94

== Archery ==
Three Kazakh archers qualified for the men's events by reaching the quarterfinal stage of the men's team recurve at the 2019 World Archery Championships in 's-Hertogenbosch, Netherlands.

Athlete	Event	Ranking round		Round of 64	Round of 32	Round of 16	Quarterfinals	Semifinals	Final / BM	
Athlete	Event	Score	Seed	Opposition Score	Opposition Score	Opposition Score	Opposition Score	Opposition Score	Opposition Score	Rank
Ilfat Abdullin	Men's individual	657	27	Woodgate (GBR); W 7–3	Wijler (NED); W 6–4	Li Jl (CHN); L 5–6	Did not advance			
Denis Gankin	Men's individual	669	9	Tolba (EGY); W 6–4	Nespoli (ITA); L 2–6	Did not advance				
Sanzhar Mussayev	Men's individual	647	52	Wang Dp (CHN); L 4–6	Did not advance					
Ilfat Abdullin; Denis Gankin; Sanzhar Mussayev	Men's team	1973	8	—N/a		India; L 2–6	Did not advance			

== Artistic swimming ==
Kazakhstan fielded a squad of two artistic swimmers to compete in the women's duet event, by securing an outright berth as the next highest-ranked pair vying for qualification from the Asian zone at the 2019 FINA World Championships in Gwangju, South Korea.

Athlete	Event	Technical routine		Free routine (preliminary)			Free routine (final)		
Athlete	Event	Points	Rank	Points	Total (technical + free)	Rank	Points	Total (technical + free)	Rank
Alexandra Nemich; Yekaterina Nemich	Duet	83.2338	17	83.8667	167.1005	16	Did not advance		

== Athletics ==
Kazakh athletes further achieved the entry standards, either by qualifying time or by world ranking, in the following track and field events (up to a maximum of 3 athletes in each event):

Key

- Note–Ranks given for track events are within the athlete's heat only
- Q = Qualified for the next round
- q = Qualified for the next round as a fastest loser or, in field events, by position without achieving the qualifying target
- NR = National record
- N/A = Round not applicable for the event
- Bye = Athlete not required to compete in round

Track & road events

Athlete	Event	Heat		Semifinal		Final	
Athlete	Event	Result	Rank	Result	Rank	Result	Rank
Mikhail Litvin	Men's 400 m	47.15	7	Did not advance			
Georgiy Sheiko	Men's 20 km walk	—N/a				1:28:38	39
Olga Safronova	Women's 200 m	23.64	6	Did not advance			
Zhanna Mamazhanova	Women's marathon	—N/a				2:37:42	46
Ayman Ratova	Women's 20 km walk	—N/a				1:40:02	42

Field events

Athlete	Event	Qualification		Final	
Athlete	Event	Distance	Position	Distance	Position
Irina Ektova	Women's triple jump	12.90	31	Did not advance	
Mariya Ovchinnikova	Women's triple jump	13.34	26	Did not advance	
Olga Rypakova	Women's triple jump	13.69	24	Did not advance	
Nadezhda Dubovitskaya	Women's high jump	1.86	28	Did not advance	
Kristina Ovchinnikova	Women's high jump	1.86	28	Did not advance	

== Boxing ==
Kazakhstan entered nine boxers (eight men and one woman) into the Olympic tournament. Rio 2016 Olympians Ablaikhan Zhussupov (men's welterweight) and silver medalist Vassiliy Levit (men's heavyweight), along with seven rookies (Bibossinov, Temirzhanov, Safiullin, Amankul, Nurdauletov, Kunkabayev, and Ryabets), secured the spots on the Kazakh squad in their respective weight divisions, either by advancing to the semifinal match or by scoring a box-off triumph, at the 2020 Asia & Oceania Qualification Tournament in Amman, Jordan.

Men

Athlete	Event	Round of 32	Round of 16	Quarterfinals	Semifinals	Final	
Athlete	Event	Opposition Result	Opposition Result	Opposition Result	Opposition Result	Opposition Result	Rank
Saken Bibossinov	Flyweight	Rivera (PUR); W 4–1	Bennama (FRA); W 5–0	Escobar (ESP); W 3–2	Yafai (GBR); L 2–3	Did not advance	3rd place, bronze medalist(s)
Serik Temirzhanov	Featherweight	Gálos (HUN); W 5–0	Ragan (USA); L 0–5	Did not advance			
Zakir Safiullin	Lightweight	Pezo (PER); W 5–0	Narimatsu (JPN); W WO	Garside (AUS); L 2–3	Did not advance		
Ablaikhan Zhussupov	Welterweight	—N/a	Johnson (USA); L 1–4	Did not advance			
Abilkhan Amankul	Middleweight	—N/a	Kakhramonov (UZB); W 5–0	Conceição (BRA); L 2–3	Did not advance		
Bekzad Nurdauletov	Light heavyweight	—N/a	Khataev (ROC); L 1–4	Did not advance			
Vassiliy Levit	Heavyweight	—N/a	Reyes (ESP); L KO	Did not advance			
Kamshybek Kunkabayev	Super heavyweight	—N/a	Hafez (EGY); W 5–0	Veriasov (ROC); W 4–1	Torrez (USA); L RSC	Did not advance	3rd place, bronze medalist(s)

Women

Athlete	Event	Round of 16	Quarterfinals	Semifinals	Final	
Athlete	Event	Opposition Result	Opposition Result	Opposition Result	Opposition Result	Rank
Nadezhda Ryabets	Middleweight	Thibeault (CAN); L 1–4	Did not advance			

== Canoeing ==
=== Slalom ===
Kazakh canoeists qualified one boat for each of the following classes through the 2021 Asian Canoe Slalom Championships in Pattaya, Thailand.

Athlete	Event	Preliminary						Semifinal		Final	
Athlete	Event	Run 1	Rank	Run 2	Rank	Best	Rank	Time	Rank	Time	Rank
Alexandr Kulikov	Men's C-1	109.95	13	107.43	14	107.43	15 Q	110.23	12	Did not advance	
Yekaterina Smirnova	Women's K-1	180.46	25	135.25	23	135.25	25	Did not advance			

=== Sprint ===
Kazakh canoeists qualified three boats in each of the following distances for the Games through the 2021 Asian Canoe Sprint Championships in Pattaya, Thailand.

Athlete	Event	Heats		Quarterfinals		Semifinals		Final	
Athlete	Event	Time	Rank	Time	Rank	Time	Rank	Time	Rank
Sergey Yemelyanov	Men's C-1 1000 m	4:16.039	5 QF	4:21.734	4	Did not advance			
Sergey Yemelyanov; Timofey Yemelyanov	Men's C-2 1000 m	3:49.079	4 QF	3:55.157	4 FB	Bye		3:32.873	12
Natalya Sergeyeva	Women's K-1 200 m	46.657	6 QF	46.736	7	Did not advance			
Natalya Sergeyeva	Women's K-1 500 m	2:01.374	7 QF	1:55.776	6	Did not advance			
Margarita Torlopova	Women's C-1 200 m	49.721	6QF	49.051	7	Did not advance			
Svetlana Ussova; Margarita Torlopova	Women's C-2 500 m	2:09.024	5 QF	2:06.179	4 FB	Bye		2:04.859	12

Qualification Legend: FA = Qualify to final (medal); FB = Qualify to final B (non-medal)

== Cycling ==
=== Road ===
Kazakhstan entered three riders to compete in the men's Olympic road race, by virtue of their top 50 national finish (for men) in the UCI World Ranking.

Athlete	Event	Time	Rank
Dmitriy Gruzdev	Men's road race	Did not finish	
Alexey Lutsenko	Men's road race	6:11:46	21
Alexey Lutsenko	Men's time trial	1:02:21	32
Vadim Pronskiy	Men's road race	Did not finish	

=== Track ===
Following the completion of the 2020 UCI Track Cycling World Championships, Kazakhstan entered two riders to compete each in the men's sprint, keirin, and omnium, based on their final individual UCI Olympic rankings.

Sprint

Athlete	Event	Qualification		Round 1	Repechage 1	Round 2	Repechage 2	Round 3	Repechage 3	Quarterfinals	Semifinals	Final	
Athlete	Event	Time Speed (km/h)	Rank	Opposition Time Speed (km/h)	Opposition Time Speed (km/h)	Opposition Time Speed (km/h)	Opposition Time Speed (km/h)	Opposition Time Speed (km/h)	Opposition Time Speed (km/h)	Opposition Time Speed (km/h)	Opposition Time Speed (km/h)	Opposition Time Speed (km/h)	Rank
Sergey Ponomaryov	Men's sprint	9.932; 72.493	29	Did not advance									

Keirin

Athlete	Event	1st Round	Repechage	2nd Round	3rd Round	Final
Athlete	Event	Rank	Rank	Rank	Rank	Rank
Sergey Ponomaryov	Men's keirin	DNF R	3	Did not advance		

Omnium

Athlete	Event	Scratch race		Tempo race		Elimination race		Points race		Total points	Rank
Athlete	Event	Rank	Points	Rank	Points	Rank	Points	Rank	Points	Total points	Rank
Artyom Zakharov	Men's omnium	4	34	15	12	13	16	15	0	62	14

== Fencing ==
Kazakhstan entered one fencer into the Olympic competition. 2013 Summer Universiade bronze medalist Ruslan Kurbanov claimed a spot in the men's épée as one of the highest-ranked fencers vying for qualification from Asia and Oceania in the FIE Adjusted Official Rankings.

Athlete	Event	Round of 64	Round of 32	Round of 16	Quarterfinal	Semifinal	Final / BM	
Athlete	Event	Opposition Score	Opposition Score	Opposition Score	Opposition Score	Opposition Score	Opposition Score	Rank
Ruslan Kurbanov	Men's épée	Bye	Fichera (ITA); W 15–7	Yamada (JPN); L 8–15	Did not advance			

== Gymnastics ==
=== Artistic ===
Kazakhstan entered one artistic gymnast into the Olympic competition. Milad Karimi booked a spot in the men's individual all-around and apparatus events, by finishing fourth out of the twelve gymnasts eligible for qualification at the 2019 World Championships in Stuttgart, Germany.

Men

Athlete	Event	Qualification								Final							
Athlete	Event	Apparatus						Total	Rank	Apparatus						Total	Rank
Athlete	Event	F	PH	R	V	PB	HB	Total	Rank	F	PH	R	V	PB	HB	Total	Rank
Milad Karimi	All-around	14.766 Q	11.900	13.300	14.433	13.400	14.766 Q	82.565	25 Q	15.033	13.266	12.866	14.066	13.966	13.333	82.530	14
Milad Karimi	Floor	14.766	—N/a					14.766	8 Q	14.133	—N/a					14.133	5
Milad Karimi	Horizontal bar	—N/a					14.766	14.766	2 Q	—N/a					11.266	11.266	8

=== Rhythmic ===
Kazakhstan qualified one rhythmic gymnast for the individual all-around by winning the gold medal at the 2021 Asian Championships in Tashkent, Uzbekistan.

Athlete	Event	Qualification						Final					
Athlete	Event	Hoop	Ball	Clubs	Ribbon	Total	Rank	Hoop	Ball	Clubs	Ribbon	Total	Rank
Alina Adilkhanova	Individual	20.550	22.450	22.200	18.600	83.800	21	Did not advance					

== Judo ==
Kazakhstan entered six judoka (five men and one woman) into the Olympic tournament based on the International Judo Federation Olympics Individual Ranking.

Athlete	Event	Round of 64	Round of 32	Round of 16	Quarterfinals	Semifinals	Repechage	Final / BM	
Athlete	Event	Opposition Result	Opposition Result	Opposition Result	Opposition Result	Opposition Result	Opposition Result	Opposition Result	Rank
Yeldos Smetov	Men's −60 kg	—N/a	Bye	Akkuş (TUR); W 10–00	Kim W-j (KOR); W 10–00	Takato (JPN); L 00–01	Bye	Tsjakadoea (NED); W 01–00	3rd place, bronze medalist(s)
Yerlan Serikzhanov	Men's −66 kg	—N/a	Safarov (AZE); W 01–00	Lombardo (ITA); L 00–01	Did not advance				
Zhansay Smagulov	Men's −73 kg	Bye	Karapetian (ARM); W 01–00	Margelidon (CAN); L 01–10	Did not advance				
Didar Khamza	Men's −81 kg	Bye	Mollaei (MGL); L 00–10	Did not advance					
Islam Bozbayev	Men's −90 kg	Macedo (BRA); W 10–00	Mehdiyev (AZE); L 00–01	Did not advance					
Galbadrakhyn Otgontsetseg	Women's −48 kg	—N/a	Li Yn (CHN); L 00–10	Did not advance					

== Karate ==
Kazakhstan entered five karateka into the inaugural Olympic tournament. 2018 world bronze medalist Darkhan Assadilov qualified directly for the men's kumite 67-kg category by finishing among the top four karateka at the end of the combined WKF Olympic Rankings. Nurkanat Azhikanov (men's 75 kg) and Moldir Zhangbyrbay (women's 55 kg) finished among the top three in the final pool round to secure places on the Kazakh squad in their respective kumite categories at the World Olympic Qualification Tournament in Paris, France, with Daniyar Yuldashev (men's +75 kg) and Sofya Berultseva (women's +61 kg) topping the field of karateka vying for qualification from the Asian zone based on the WKD Olympic Rankings.

Kumite

Athlete	Event	Round robin					Semifinals	Final	
Athlete	Event	Opposition Result	Opposition Result	Opposition Result	Opposition Result	Rank	Opposition Result	Opposition Result	Rank
Darkhan Assadilov	Men's −67 kg	Şamdan (TUR); W 6–2	Farzaliyev (AZE); W 6–2	Sago (JPN); W 3–0	El-Sawy (EGY); W 3–1	1 Q	Da Costa (FRA); L 2–5	Did not advance	3rd place, bronze medalist(s)
Nurkanat Azhikanov	Men's −75 kg	Yahiro (AUS); W 6–3	Bitsch (GER); L 3–3	Busà (ITA); W 2–0	Aghayev (AZE); L 2–3	4	Did not advance		
Daniyar Yuldashev	Men's +75 kg	Araga (JPN); L 2–4	Aktaş (TUR); L 3–11	Horne (GER); Withdrawn	Arkania (GEO); L 1–3	4	Did not advance		
Moldir Zhangbyrbay	Women's −55 kg	Sayed (EGY); W 7–2	Plank (AUT); L 3–4	Terliuga (UKR); D 4–4	Miyahara (JPN); L 2–11	4	Did not advance		
Sofya Berultseva	Women's +61 kg	Hocaoğlu (TUR); D 5–5	Semeraro (ITA); W 5–1	Zaretska (AZE); W 5–4	Uekusa (JPN); L 1–5	2 q	Abdelaziz (EGY); L 4–5	Did not advance	3rd place, bronze medalist(s)

== Modern pentathlon ==
Kazakh athletes qualified for the following spots to compete in modern pentathlon. Two-time Olympian Pavel Ilyashenko and Rio 2016 Olympian Yelena Potapenko confirmed places each in the men's and women's event, respectively, with the former finishing third and the latter fifth among those eligible for Olympic qualification at the 2019 Asia & Oceania Championships in Kunming, China.

Athlete	Event	Fencing (épée one touch)				Swimming (200 m freestyle)			Riding (show jumping)			Combined: shooting/running (10 m air pistol)/(3200 m)			Total points	Final rank
Athlete	Event	RR	BR	Rank	MP points	Time	Rank	MP points	Penalties	Rank	MP points	Time	Rank	MP points	Total points	Final rank
Pavel Ilyashenko	Men's	15–20	1	28	191	2:06.99	31	297	30	28	270	12:10.28	35	570	1328	29
Yelena Potapenko	Women's	22–15	2	6	222	2:13.99	14	283	11	16	289	12:52.37	21	528	1322	13

== Rowing ==
Kazakhstan qualified one boat in the men's single sculls for the Games by winning the bronze medal and securing the third of five berths available at the 2021 FISA Asia & Oceania Olympic Qualification Regatta in Tokyo, Japan.

Athlete	Event	Heats		Repechage		Quarterfinals		Semifinals		Final	
Athlete	Event	Time	Rank	Time	Rank	Time	Rank	Time	Rank	Time	Rank
Vladislav Yakovlev	Men's single sculls	7:10.08	3 QF	Bye		7:30.47	6 SC/D	7:03.53	5 FD	7:03.37	19

Qualification Legend: FA=Final A (medal); FB=Final B (non-medal); FC=Final C (non-medal); FD=Final D (non-medal); FE=Final E (non-medal); FF=Final F (non-medal); SA/B=Semifinals A/B; SC/D=Semifinals C/D; SE/F=Semifinals E/F; QF=Quarterfinals; R=Repechage

== Shooting ==
Kazakh shooters achieved quota places for the following events by virtue of their best finishes at the 2018 ISSF World Championships, the 2019 ISSF World Cup series, and Asian Championships, as long as they obtained a minimum qualifying score (MQS) by May 31, 2020.

Meanwhile, Zoya Kravchenko earned a direct place in the women's skeet for the rescheduled Games as the highest-ranked shooter vying for qualification in the ISSF World Olympic Rankings of 6 June 2021.

Athlete	Event	Qualification		Final	
Athlete	Event	Points	Rank	Points	Rank
Yuriy Yurkov	Men's 10 m air rifle	621.9	36	Did not advance	
Yuriy Yurkov	Men's 50 m rifle 3 positions	1172	14	Did not advance	
Zoya Kravchenko	Women's skeet	113	22	Did not advance	
Assem Orynbay	Women's skeet	111	26	Did not advance	

== Sport climbing ==
Kazakhstan entered one sport climber into the Olympic tournament. Rishat Khaibullin qualified directly for the men's combined event, by advancing to the final and securing one of the seven provisional berths at the 2019 IFSC World Championships in Hachioji, Japan.

Athlete	Event	Qualification									Final								
Athlete	Event	Speed		Boulder		Lead			Total	Rank	Speed		Boulder		Lead			Total	Rank
Athlete	Event	Best	Place	Result	Place	Hold	Time	Place	Total	Rank	Best	Place	Result	Place	Hold	Time	Place	Total	Rank
Rishat Khaibullin	Men's	6.19	4	0T1z 0 3	17	28+	3:09	13	884.00	11	Did not advance								

== Swimming ==
Kazakh swimmers further achieved qualifying standards in the following events (up to a maximum of 2 swimmers in each event at the Olympic Qualifying Time (OQT), and potentially 1 at the Olympic Selection Time (OST)):

Athlete	Event	Heat		Semifinal		Final	
Athlete	Event	Time	Rank	Time	Rank	Time	Rank
Dmitriy Balandin	Men's 100 m breaststroke	59.75	17	Did not advance			
Dmitriy Balandin	Men's 200 m breaststroke	2:08.99	7 Q	2:09.22	11	Did not advance	
Diana Nazarova	Women's 100 m backstroke	1:06.99	40	Did not advance			

== Table tennis ==
Kazakhstan entered two athlete into the table tennis competition at the Games. Anastassiya Lavrova scored a zonal-match triumph for Central Asia to book a women's singles spot at the Asian Qualification Tournament in Doha, Qatar. Meanwhile, Rio 2016 Olympian Kirill Gerassimenko was automatically selected among the top ten table tennis players vying for qualification in the men's singles based on the ITTF Olympic Rankings of June 1, 2021.

Athlete	Event	Preliminary	Round 1	Round 2	Round 3	Round of 16	Quarterfinals	Semifinals	Final / BM	
Athlete	Event	Opposition Result	Opposition Result	Opposition Result	Opposition Result	Opposition Result	Opposition Result	Opposition Result	Opposition Result	Rank
Kirill Gerassimenko	Men's singles	Bye		Jančařík (CZE); W 4–3	Boll (GER); L 1–4	Did not advance				
Anastassiya Lavrova	Women's singles	Bye	Xiao (ESP); L 1–4	Did not advance						

== Taekwondo ==
Kazakhstan entered two athletes into the taekwondo competition at the Games. Rio 2016 Olympians Ruslan Zhaparov (men's +80 kg) and Cansel Deniz (women's +67 kg) secured the spots on the Kazakh taekwondo squad with a top two finish each in their respective weight classes at the 2021 Asian Qualification Tournament in Amman, Jordan.

Athlete	Event	Round of 16	Quarterfinals	Semifinals	Repechage	Final / BM	
Athlete	Event	Opposition Result	Opposition Result	Opposition Result	Opposition Result	Opposition Result	Rank
Ruslan Zhaparov	Men's +80 kg	Bachmann (GER); W 11–7	In K-d (KOR); L 2–10	Did not advance			
Cansel Deniz	Women's +67 kg	Osipova (UZB); W 10–9	Walkden (GBR); L 7–17	Did not advance			

== Tennis ==
Kazakhstan entered seven tennis players (three male and four female).

Men

Athlete	Event	Round of 64	Round of 32	Round of 16	Quarterfinals	Semifinals	Final / BM	
Athlete	Event	Opposition Score	Opposition Score	Opposition Score	Opposition Score	Opposition Score	Opposition Score	Rank
Alexander Bublik	Singles	Medvedev (ROC); L 4–6, 6–7^{(8–10)}	Did not advance					
Mikhail Kukushkin	Singles	Coria (ARG); W 7–6^{(7–4)}, 7–5	Ivashka (BLR); L 7–6^{(7–4)}, 3–6, 3–6	Did not advance				
Alexander Bublik; Andrey Golubev	Doubles	—N/a	Chardy / Monfils (FRA); L 7–6^{(7–4)}, 6–7^{(3–7)}, [8–10]	Did not advance				

Women

Athlete	Event	Round of 64	Round of 32	Round of 16	Quarterfinals	Semifinals	Final / BM	
Athlete	Event	Opposition Score	Opposition Score	Opposition Score	Opposition Score	Opposition Score	Opposition Score	Rank
Zarina Diyas	Singles	Krejčíková (CZE); L 2–5, ret	Did not advance					
Yulia Putintseva	Singles	Podoroska (ARG); L 6–7^{(4–7)}, 3–1, ret	Did not advance					
Elena Rybakina	Singles	Stosur (AUS); W 6–4, 6–2	Peterson (SWE); W 6–2, 6–3	Vekić (CRO); W 7–6^{(7–3)}, 6–4	Muguruza (ESP); W 7–5, 6–1	Bencic (SUI); L 6–7^{(2–7)}, 6–4, 3–6	Svitolina (UKR); L 6–1, 6–7^{(5–7)}, 4–6	4
Yaroslava Shvedova	Singles	Tomljanović (AUS); L 5–7, 2–3, ret	Did not advance					

Mixed

Athlete	Event	Round of 16	Quarterfinals	Semifinals	Final / BM	
Athlete	Event	Opposition Score	Opposition Score	Opposition Score	Opposition Score	Rank
Yaroslava Shvedova; Andrey Golubev	Doubles	Shibahara / McLachlan (JPN); L 3–6, 6–7^{(3–7)}	Did not advance			

== Water polo ==
Summary

Key:
- FT – After full time.
- P – Match decided by penalty-shootout.

Team	Event	Group stage						Quarterfinal	Semifinal	Final / BM	
Team	Event	Opposition Score	Opposition Score	Opposition Score	Opposition Score	Opposition Score	Rank	Opposition Score	Opposition Score	Opposition Score	Rank
Kazakhstan men's	Men's tournament	Croatia; L 7–23	Serbia; L 5–19	Spain; L 4–16	Montenegro; L 12–19	Australia; L 7–15	6	Did not advance			

=== Men's tournament ===
Kazakhstan men's national water polo team qualified for the Olympics by winning the gold medal and securing an outright berth at the 2018 Asian Games in Jakarta, Indonesia, marking the country's recurrence to the sport for the first time since London 2012.

Team roster

Head coach: (Montenegro) Nemanja Knežević

No.	Player	Pos.	L/R	Height	Weight	Date of birth (age)	Apps	OG/ Goals	Club	Ref
1	Madikhan Makhmetov	GK	R	1.83 m (6 ft 0 in)	82 kg (181 lb)	3 March 1993 (aged 28)	120	0/0	(Kazakhstan) Astana	
2	Yevgeniy Medvedev	D	R	1.86 m (6 ft 1 in)	90 kg (198 lb)	9 August 1985 (aged 35)	150	0/0	(Kazakhstan) Astana	
3	Miras Aubakirov	D	R	1.83 m (6 ft 0 in)	83 kg (183 lb)	20 October 1996 (aged 24)	170	0/0	(Kazakhstan) Astana	
4	Dušan Marković	CB	R	1.92 m (6 ft 4 in)	103 kg (227 lb)	3 May 1990 (aged 31)	6	0/0	(Serbia) Crvena zvezda	
5	Alexey Shmider	D	R	1.83 m (6 ft 0 in)	83 kg (183 lb)	19 March 1990 (aged 31)	180	1/2	(Kazakhstan) Astana	
6	Danil Artyukh	CB	R	1.93 m (6 ft 4 in)	95 kg (209 lb)	2 June 2003 (aged 18)	6	0/0	(Kazakhstan) Astana	
7	Murat Shakenov (C)	D	R	1.83 m (6 ft 0 in)	80 kg (176 lb)	23 September 1990 (aged 30)	200	1/1	(Kazakhstan) Astana	
8	Srđan Vuksanović	D	R	2.02 m (6 ft 8 in)	85 kg (187 lb)	5 July 1992 (aged 29)	6	0/0	(Serbia) Šabac	
9	Rustam Ukumanov	D	R	1.92 m (6 ft 4 in)	103 kg (227 lb)	22 March 1986 (aged 35)	327	1/3	(Kazakhstan) Astana	
10	Mikhail Ruday	CF	R	1.92 m (6 ft 4 in)	110 kg (243 lb)	4 May 1988 (aged 33)	180	1/0	(Russia) Spartak Volgograd	
11	Altay Altayev	CF	R	1.94 m (6 ft 4 in)	100 kg (220 lb)	14 February 1996 (aged 25)	150	0/0	(Kazakhstan) Astana	
12	Stanislav Shvedov	CB	R	1.83 m (6 ft 0 in)	83 kg (183 lb)	24 November 1998 (aged 22)	100	0/0	(Kazakhstan) Astana	
13	Pavel Lipilin	GK	R	1.97 m (6 ft 6 in)	77 kg (170 lb)	11 July 1999 (aged 22)	36	0/0	(Kazakhstan) Astana	
Average				1.89 m (6 ft 2 in)	90 kg (198 lb)	28 years, 123 days	125			

Note: Age as of 23 July 2021
Source: Kazakhstan Men | Tokyo 2020 Olympics Archived 2021-07-22 at the Wayback Machine

Group play

Pos	Team	Pld	W	D	L	GF	GA	GD	Pts	Qualification
1	Spain	5	5	0	0	61	31	+30	10	Quarterfinals
2	Croatia	5	3	0	2	62	46	+16	6 (Note: Croatia 14–12 Serbia)	Quarterfinals
3	Serbia	5	3	0	2	70	46	+24	6	Quarterfinals
4	Montenegro	5	2	0	3	54	56	−2	4 (Note: Australia 10–15 Montenegro)	Quarterfinals
5	Australia	5	2	0	3	49	60	−11	4	
6	Kazakhstan	5	0	0	5	35	92	−57	0	

Source: Tokyo 2020 and FINA
Rules for classification: 1) Points; 2) Head-to-head points; 3) Head-to-head goal difference; 4) Head-to-head goals scored; 5) Goal difference.
Notes:

25 July 2021; 19:50 v	Report	Croatia	23–7	Kazakhstan	Tokyo Tatsumi International Swimming Center; Referees: Dion Willis (RSA), Frank Ohme (GER)
25 July 2021; 19:50 v	Report	Score by quarters: 4–1, 6–3, 8–1, 5–2			Tokyo Tatsumi International Swimming Center; Referees: Dion Willis (RSA), Frank Ohme (GER)
25 July 2021; 19:50 v	Report	Joković 5	Goals	Vuksanović 3	Tokyo Tatsumi International Swimming Center; Referees: Dion Willis (RSA), Frank Ohme (GER)

27 July 2021; 14:00 v	Report	Kazakhstan	5–19	Serbia	Tokyo Tatsumi International Swimming Center; Referees: Adrian Alexandrescu (ROU), György Kun (HUN)
27 July 2021; 14:00 v	Report	Score by quarters: 2–4, 1–3, 2–6, 0–6			Tokyo Tatsumi International Swimming Center; Referees: Adrian Alexandrescu (ROU), György Kun (HUN)
27 July 2021; 14:00 v	Report	Medvedev, Vuksanović 2	Goals	Pijetlović 4	Tokyo Tatsumi International Swimming Center; Referees: Adrian Alexandrescu (ROU), György Kun (HUN)

29 July 2021; 11:30 v	Report	Spain	16–4	Kazakhstan	Tokyo Tatsumi International Swimming Center; Referees: Michael Goldenberg (USA), Dion Willis (RSA)
29 July 2021; 11:30 v	Report	Score by quarters: 3–0, 3–0, 5–2, 5–2			Tokyo Tatsumi International Swimming Center; Referees: Michael Goldenberg (USA), Dion Willis (RSA)
29 July 2021; 11:30 v	Report	Granados 5	Goals	Vuksanović 2	Tokyo Tatsumi International Swimming Center; Referees: Michael Goldenberg (USA), Dion Willis (RSA)

31 July 2021; 10:00 v	Report	Montenegro	19–12	Kazakhstan	Tokyo Tatsumi International Swimming Center; Referees: Frank Ohme (GER), Georgios Stavridis (GRE)
31 July 2021; 10:00 v	Report	Score by quarters: 5–3, 6–3, 3–3, 5–3			Tokyo Tatsumi International Swimming Center; Referees: Frank Ohme (GER), Georgios Stavridis (GRE)
31 July 2021; 10:00 v	Report	three players 4	Goals	Ruday 3	Tokyo Tatsumi International Swimming Center; Referees: Frank Ohme (GER), Georgios Stavridis (GRE)

2 August 2021; 19:50 v	Report	Australia	15–7	Kazakhstan	Tokyo Tatsumi International Swimming Center; Referees: Germán Moller (ARG), Michael Goldenberg (USA)
2 August 2021; 19:50 v	Report	Score by quarters: 4–1, 3–0, 5–2, 3–4			Tokyo Tatsumi International Swimming Center; Referees: Germán Moller (ARG), Michael Goldenberg (USA)
2 August 2021; 19:50 v	Report	Howden 5	Goals	Shakenov, Ukumanov 2	Tokyo Tatsumi International Swimming Center; Referees: Germán Moller (ARG), Michael Goldenberg (USA)

== Weightlifting ==
Kazakhstan entered two weightlifters into the Olympic competition. London 2012 Olympian Zulfiya Chinshanlo (women's 55 kg) finished fourth of the eight highest-ranked weightlifters in the women's 55 kg category based on the IWF Absolute World Rankings, with Igor Son topping the field of weightlifters from the Asian zone in the men's 61 kg category based on the IWF Absolute Continental Rankings.

Athlete	Event	Snatch		Clean & Jerk		Total	Rank
Athlete	Event	Result	Rank	Result	Rank	Total	Rank
Igor Son	Men's −61 kg	131	4	163	3	294	3rd place, bronze medalist(s)
Zulfiya Chinshanlo	Women's −55 kg	90	7	123	3	213	3rd place, bronze medalist(s)

== Wrestling ==
Kazakhstan qualified eleven wrestlers for each of the following classes into the Olympic competition. Eight of them finished among the top six to book Olympic spots in the men's freestyle (57, 65, 74, and 97 kg), men's Greco-Roman (60 and 77 kg), and women's freestyle (50 and 76 kg) at the 2019 World Championships, while three additional licenses were awarded to the Kazakh wrestler, who progressed to the top two finals of their respective weight categories at the 2021 Asian Qualification Tournament in Almaty.

Key:

- VT (ranking points: 5–0 or 0–5) – Victory by fall.
- VB (ranking points: 5–0 or 0–5) – Victory by injury (VF for forfeit, VA for withdrawal or disqualification)
- PP (ranking points: 3–1 or 1–3) – Decision by points – the loser with technical points.
- PO (ranking points: 3–0 or 0–3) – Decision by points – the loser without technical points.
- ST (ranking points: 4–0 or 0–4) – Great superiority – the loser without technical points and a margin of victory of at least 8 (Greco-Roman) or 10 (freestyle) points.
- SP (ranking points: 4–1 or 1–4) – Technical superiority – the loser with technical points and a margin of victory of at least 8 (Greco-Roman) or 10 (freestyle) points.

Freestyle

Athlete	Event	Round of 16	Quarterfinal	Semifinal	Repechage	Final / BM	
Athlete	Event	Opposition Result	Opposition Result	Opposition Result	Opposition Result	Opposition Result	Rank
Nurislam Sanayev	Men's −57 kg	Fafé (GBS); W 3–0 ^{PO}	Takahashi (JPN); W 3–1 ^{PP}	Dahiya (IND); L 0–5 ^{VT}	Bye	Vangelov (BUL); W 3–1 ^{PP}	3rd place, bronze medalist(s)
Daulet Niyazbekov	Men's −65 kg	Valdés (CUB); W 3–1 ^{PP}	Aliyev (AZE); L 1–3 ^{PP}	Did not advance	Diatta (SEN); W 4–0 ^{ST}	Punia (IND); L 0–3 ^{PO}	5
Daniyar Kaisanov	Men's −74 kg	Otoguro (JPN); W 5–0 ^{VT}	Hussen (EGY); W 3–1 ^{PP}	Sidakov (ROC); L 0–4 ^{ST}	Bye	Abdurakhmonov (UZB); L 1–4 ^{SP}	5
Alisher Yergali	Men's −97 kg	Fardj (ALG); W 5–0 ^{VA}	Karadeniz (TUR); L 1–3 ^{PP}	Did not advance			7
Yusup Batirmurzaev	Men's −125 kg	Cudinovic (GER); L 0–5 ^{VT}	Did not advance				12
Valentina Islamova	Women's −50 kg	Yépez (ECU); L 1–3 ^{PP}	Did not advance				11
Tatyana Amanzhol	Women's −53 kg	Zasina (POL); L 1–3 ^{PP}	Did not advance				12
Elmira Syzdykova	Women's −76 kg	Medet Kyzy (KGZ); L 1–3 ^{PP}	Did not advance				13

Greco-Roman

Athlete	Event	Round of 16	Quarterfinal	Semifinal	Repechage	Final / BM	
Athlete	Event	Opposition Result	Opposition Result	Opposition Result	Opposition Result	Opposition Result	Rank
Mirambek Ainagulov	Men's −60 kg	Sharshenbekov (KGZ); L 0–4 ^{ST}	Did not advance				16
Demeu Zhadrayev	Men's −77 kg	Yabiku (JPN); L 1–3 ^{PP}	Did not advance				9
Nursultan Tursynov	Men's −87 kg	Kudla (GER); L 1–3 ^{PP}	Did not advance				14

== See also ==
- Kazakhstan at the 2020 Summer Paralympics
