= 2021 AIBA World Boxing Championships – Welterweight =

Boxing competition

Welterweight at the 2021 AIBA World Boxing Championships
- Venue: Štark Arena
- Location: Belgrade, Serbia
- Dates: 25 October – 5 November
- Competitors: 49 from 49 nations

Medalists
gold medal	Sewon Okazawa	Japan
silver medal	Omari Jones	United States
bronze medal	Ablaikhan Zhussupov	Kazakhstan
bronze medal	Lasha Guruli	Georgia

The Welterweight competition at the 2021 AIBA World Boxing Championships was held from 25 October to 5 November 2021.

== Results ==
=== Finals ===
Semifinals
(Japan) Sewon Okazawa	4
(Kazakhstan) Ablaikhan Zhussupov	1
(Georgia (country)) Lasha Guruli
(United States) Omari Jones	w/o

Final
(Japan) Sewon Okazawa	3
(United States) Omari Jones	2

=== Top half ===
==== Section 1 ====
First round
(Republic of Ireland) Eugene McKeever	0
(Uzbekistan) Asadkhuja Muydinkhujaev	5
(Moldova) Dmitri Galagoț	5
Sultan Mohammad Naeemi	0
(Japan) Sewon Okazawa	3
(Ecuador) Miguel Ferrín	2
(Nepal) Sanil Shahi	w/o
(Iraq) Isam Al-Ogaidi
(Kyrgyzstan) Zhakshylyk Talaibekov	RSC
(Cameroon) Jean Marie Onana Ngah

Second round
(Palestine) Ahmed Harara	0
(Uzbekistan) Asadkhuja Muydinkhujaev	5
(Moldova) Dmitri Galagoț	0
(Japan) Sewon Okazawa	5
(Serbia) Vakhid Abbasov	5
(Nepal) Sanil Shahi	0
(Kyrgyzstan) Zhakshylyk Talaibekov	4
(Jordan) Obada Al-Kasbeh	1

Third round
(Uzbekistan) Asadkhuja Muydinkhujaev	0
(Japan) Sewon Okazawa	5
(Serbia) Vakhid Abbasov	5
(Kyrgyzstan) Zhakshylyk Talaibekov	0

Quarterfinals
(Japan) Sewon Okazawa	4
(Serbia) Vakhid Abbasov	1

==== Section 2 ====
First round
(Chinese Taipei) Lin Yu	0
(Kazakhstan) Ablaikhan Zhussupov	5
(Slovenia) Aljaž Šircelj	0
(Armenia) Gurgen Madoyan	5
(Hungary) Milán Fodor	0
(Mexico) Marco Hernández	5
(Guatemala) Carlos Tobar	1
(Mongolia) Baatarsükhiin Chinzorig	4

Second round
(Venezuela) Christiann Palacio	0
(Kazakhstan) Ablaikhan Zhussupov	5
(Armenia) Gurgen Madoyan	1
(Poland) Damian Durkacz	4
(Kenya) Joseph Shigali	0
(Mexico) Marco Hernández	5
(Mongolia) Baatarsükhiin Chinzorig	5
(Italy) Vincenzo Mangiacapre	0

Third round
(Kazakhstan) Ablaikhan Zhussupov	5
(Poland) Damian Durkacz	0
(Mexico) Marco Hernández	0
(Mongolia) Baatarsükhiin Chinzorig	5

Quarterfinals
(Kazakhstan) Ablaikhan Zhussupov	5
(Mongolia) Baatarsükhiin Chinzorig	0

=== Bottom half ===
==== Section 3 ====
First round
(Puerto Rico) Bryan Pérez	2
(South Korea) Lee Sang-min	3
(Georgia (country)) Lasha Guruli	5
(The Bahamas) Rashield Williams	0
(Jamaica) Joshua Frazer
(Cuba) Kevin Brown	w/o
(Turkey) Adem Furkan Avcı	0
(India) Akash Sangwan	5

Second round
(Iran) Moslem Maghsoudi	5
(South Korea) Lee Sang-min	0
(Georgia (country)) Lasha Guruli	5
(Slovakia) Michal Takács	0
(Seychelles) Shain Boniface	0
(Cuba) Kevin Brown	5
(India) Akash Sangwan	4
(Germany) Deniel Krotter	1

Third round
(Iran) Moslem Maghsoudi	0
(Georgia (country)) Lasha Guruli	5
(Cuba) Kevin Brown	5
(India) Akash Sangwan	0

Quarterfinals
(Georgia (country)) Lasha Guruli	4
(Cuba) Kevin Brown	1

==== Section 4 ====
First round
(Democratic Republic of the Congo) Djo Kayala Engulu
(United States) Omari Jones	w/o
(Bulgaria) Vensan Kirkorov	0
(Norway) Martin Skogheim	5
Evgenii Kool	4
(England) Harvey Lambert	1
(Brazil) Wanderson de Oliveira	RSC
Atichai Phoemsap

Second round
(Scotland) Tyler Jolly	0
(United States) Omari Jones	5
(Norway) Martin Skogheim	3
(Tajikistan) Saidikrom Amonov	2
(Ukraine) Viktor Petrov	5
Evgenii Kool	0
(Brazil) Wanderson de Oliveira	RSC
(Croatia) Antonio Tkalčić

Third round
(United States) Omari Jones	5
(Norway) Martin Skogheim	0
(Ukraine) Viktor Petrov	0
(Brazil) Wanderson de Oliveira	5

Quarterfinals
(United States) Omari Jones	5
(Brazil) Wanderson de Oliveira	0
