= Boxing at the 2022 Commonwealth Games – Men's super heavyweight =

Boxing competitions

Boxing – Men's super heavyweight at the 2022 Commonwealth Games
- Venue: National Exhibition Centre Hall 4
- Dates: July 31 – 7 August 2022
- Competitors: 10 from 10 nations

Medalists
gold medal	Delicious Orie	England
silver medal	Sagar Ahlawat	India
bronze medal	Ifeanyi Onyekwere	Nigeria
bronze medal	Leuila Mau'u	New Zealand

The men's super heavyweight boxing competitions at the 2022 Commonwealth Games in Birmingham, England took place between July 31 and August 7 at National Exhibition Centre Hall 4. Super heavyweights were limited to those boxers weighing over 92 kilograms.

Like all Commonwealth boxing events, the competition was a straight single-elimination tournament. Both semifinal losers were awarded bronze medals, so no boxers competed again after their first loss. Bouts consisted of three rounds of three minutes each, with one-minute breaks between rounds.

== Schedule ==
The schedule is as follows:

Date	Round
Sunday 31 July	Preliminaries
Thursday 4 August	Quarter-finals
Saturday 6 August	Semi-finals
Sunday 7 August 2022	Final

== Results ==
The draw is as follows:

=== Bracket ===
Round of 16
Maxime Yegnong Njieyo (CMR)	0
Sagar Ahlawat (IND)	5
Nigel Paul (TTO)	RSC
Jean Otendy (MRI)

Quarterfinals
Keddy Agnes (SEY)	0
Sagar Ahlawat (IND)	5
Jerome Feujio (CAN)	0
Ifeanyi Onyekwere (NGR)	5
Leran Regis (LCA)
Leuila Mau'u (NZL)	KO
Nigel Paul (TTO)	0
Delicious Orie (ENG)	5

Semifinals
Sagar Ahlawat (IND)	5
Ifeanyi Onyekwere (NGR)	0
Leuila Mau'u (NZL)	0
Delicious Orie (ENG)	5

Final
Sagar Ahlawat (IND)	0
Delicious Orie (ENG)	5
