= Ashish Kumar Chaudhary =

Indian amateur boxer (born 1994)

Personal information
- Nationality: Indian
- Born: 18 July 1994 (age 32) Dhanotu, Mandi district, Himachal Pradesh, India
- Height: 1.85 m (6 ft 1 in)
- Weight: 75 kg (165 lb)

Boxing career
- Stance: Orthodox
Medal record
Men's amateur boxing
Representing India
National Games
Gold medal – first place	2015 Kerala	Middleweight
Asian Championships
Silver medal – second place	2019 Bangkok	Middleweight
Asia/Oceania Olympics Qualifier
Bronze medal – third place	2020 Jordan	Middleweight

Ashish Kumar Chaudhary (born 18 July 1994) is an Indian amateur boxer who competes in the middleweight category. He won a silver medal at the 2019 Asian Championships and a gold medal at 2019 Thailand Open International Boxing Tournament held in Bangkok. He also won bronze medal at 2020 Asia/Oceania Olympics Qualifier and represented India in middleweight category at 2020 Olympics held in Tokyo, Japan.

== Early and personal life ==
Ashish Kumar Chaudhary was born on 18 July 1994 in Dhanotu, Mandi district, Himachal Pradesh to Bhagat Ram Dogra and Durga Devi. His father was a farmer and played kabaddi at the national level. Kumar was inspired to take up boxing by his brothers and cousins who have competed at national and international levels in Boxing, Wrestling and Wushu.

Kumar's father died a month before Kumar competed at the 2020 Olympic Qualification Tournament in Amman, Jordan. He went on to reach semifinals of the event and won a bronze medal and therefore qualified for the 2020 Olympic Games in Tokyo.

== Career ==
Kumar won his first National Games Gold medal in 2015 in Kerala. He won his debut international medal as a silver medalist at the 2019 Asian Amateur Boxing Championships in Bangkok in the middleweight category. He won gold medal in 2019 at Thailand Open International Boxing Tournament held in Bangkok. He played in middleweight category for Gujarat Giants in maiden Big Bout Indian Boxing League held in 2019. Gujarat Giants won the league and Ashish Kumar was declared Player of the Tie in the final match. In March 2020, Kumar reached the semifinals of the 2020 Asia & Oceania Boxing Olympic Qualification Tournament in Amman, Jordan and qualified for the 2020 Summer Olympics. He is the first boxer ever from Himachal Pradesh to qualify for Olympics.

== Awards and recognition ==
- Parshuram Award (2019): Parshuram Award is the highest award in the field of sports given by Himachal Pradesh Government. It was presented to Ashish Kumar by the Chief Minister of Himachal Pradesh on the occasion of 49th statehood day.
