= Omari Jones =

American boxer (born 2002)

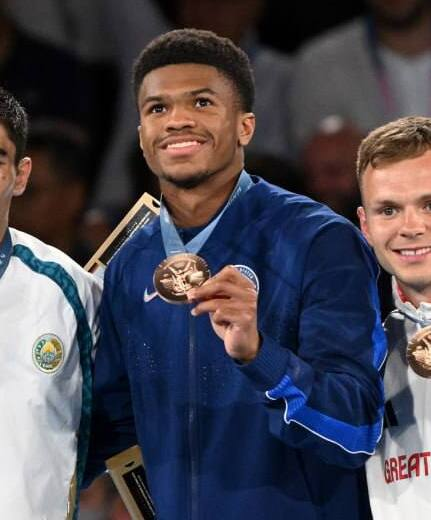
- Olympic medal ceremony 2024

Personal information
- Nickname: Banger
- Nationality: United States
- Born: Omari Lamon Jones; November 7, 2002 (age 23) Orlando, Florida, U.S.
- Height: 6 ft 2 in (1.88 m)
- Weight: Welterweight; Light middleweight

Boxing career
- Reach: 70 in (178 cm)
- Stance: Orthodox

Boxing record
- Total fights: 8
- Wins: 8
- Win by KO: 5
- Losses: 0
- No contests: 0
Medal record
Men's amateur boxing
Representing United States
Olympic Games
Bronze medal – third place	2024 Paris	Welterweight
IBA World Championships
Silver medal – second place	2021 Belgrade	Welterweight

Omari 'The Banger' Jones (/oʊˈmɑːriː/ oh-MAR-ee; born November 7, 2002) is an American professional boxer.

As an amateur, he won a silver medal in the welterweight division at the 2021 AIBA World Boxing Championships. At the 2024 Paris Olympics, Jones won a bronze medal in the welterweight division. He turned professional in January 2025, signing a promotional contract with Matchroom Boxing.

== Background ==
Jones has competed in combat sports for a majority of his life. He started with karate lessons at age four and transitioned to boxing at age eight. Jones currently trains professionally with coach Jason Galarza in Orlando, Florida.

In December 2024, Jones graduated from Valencia College, Orlando with an associate degree.

== Professional career ==
Jones signed a promotional deal with Eddie Hearn and Matchroom on January 21, 2025, five months after winning a bronze medal in the welterweight division at the 2024 Paris Olympics games. Jones explained his decision saying, “I chose Eddie because he came to meet with me in Paris after my last fight in the Olympics and I understood how serious he was about my making a superstar and global star. I also want to stay busy, and I feel that Matchroom and Eddie Hearn is the perfect fit for that.” He continued to train with Jason Galarza in his home city of Orlando.

Jones made his professional boxing debut on March 15, 2025 at Caribe Royale Orlando in Orlando, Florida. His opponent was revealed as Alessio Mastronunzi, in a scheduled 6-round bout, which would take place just above the welterweight limit. Jones would go on to win that fight via TKO in the second round. Jones threw 116 total punches, landing 40 (34.5%). Mastronunzi landed two punches, which came in round 1. After the bout, Hearn announced Jones would next feature on the Jaron Ennis vs. Eimantis Stanionis undercard in Atlantic City on April 12, 2025. Jones stopped 36 year old William Jackson in the opening round. The stoppage came after only 1 minute and 47 seconds to remain undefeated. Jones was looking to get rounds in against Jackson, but was unable to, after Jackson made little attempt to get up following the knockdown.

His next bout was expected to take place on the Richardson Hitchins vs. George Kambosos undercard in New York, on June 14. Instead, he next fought on July 12 at Ford Center in Frisco, Texas against Alfredo Blanco. Jones dropped him twice, stopping him at the end of the third round.

Jones' next fight was scheduled to take place on November 1, 2025 at the Caribe Royale Orlando. His opponent was Yusuph Metu (12-2, 9 KOs) in a six-round contest. On the fight, he said, “I started training a week or so after my fight [against Blanco], so it's been a long time coming.” Jones regarded this as his toughest test to date. Jones scored a third-round TKO victory over Metu, maintaining his perfect stoppage record. He became the first fighter to defeat Metu by stoppage. A check hook resulted in Metu being dropped at the end of the first round. Jones delivered powerful counter punches that affected Metu's performance. The fight concluded when Jones landed a right hand, followed by a left hook, causing Metu to take a knee and remain down for the full count. After the fight, Eddie Hearn announced that Jones' next fight would be in January 2026 in Las Vegas.

The event was scheduled for January 24, on the Raymond Muratalla vs. Andy Cruz undercard. Jones' opponent was Jerome Baxter (7–0, 3 KOs) in a six-round bout. Jones went the distance for the first time as a professional, dropping Baxter and winning a unanimous decision. A left hook buzzed Baxter within a minute of the opening bell, and with 50 seconds to go of the first, Jones dropped him with a jab. Baxter recovered but was outmatched throughout the remainder of the fight. All three judges scored the same 60–53 for Jones.

His next fight took take place on March 21 at the Caribe Royale Resort, where he made his debut nearly a year prior. He fought Christian Gomez, who was on a 2-fight losing streak. He put on a commanding performance by outboxing Gomez, winning via unanimous decision. He used his advantages in height, speed, and reach from the opening bell. His stiff jab helped keep Gomez at a distance. All three judges scored the fight 80–72 in favor of Jones. He described the fight as the best performance of his career.

On May 30, Jones fought at the Fertitta Center in Houston, defeating 30 year old Diego Zuniga by unanimous decision. All three scorecards read 80–71 in his favor. He scored a knockdown in the first, following a right–left combination; however, after the knockdown, Jones chose to box patiently rather than press for the stoppage. He outboxed Zuniga comfortably. After the fight, his promoters, Matchroom Boxing, planned for two more fight in 2026.

Jones faced Alan Sanchez in the main event of Project Series 2 on October 2, 2026, at Caribe Royale Orlando in Orlando, Florida. He won by technical knockout in the second round when the referee halted the bout as Jones delivered a series of unanswered punches with his opponent backed up against the ropes.

== Professional boxing record ==
8 fights	8 wins	0 losses
By knockout	5	0
By decision	3	0

No.	Result	Record	Opponent	Type	Round, time	Date	Location	Notes
8	Win	8–0	Alan Sanchez	TKO	2 (8), 0:49	Oct 2, 2026	Caribe Royale, Orlando, Florida, U.S.	
7	Win	7–0	Diego Zuniga	UD	8	May 30, 2026	Fertitta Center, Houston, Texas, U.S.	
6	Win	6–0	Christian Gomez	UD	8	Mar 21, 2026	Caribe Royale, Orlando, Florida, U.S.	
5	Win	5–0	Jerome Baxter	UD	6	Jan 24, 2026	Fontainebleau, Winchester, Nevada, U.S.	
4	Win	4–0	Yusuph Metu	TKO	3 (6), 1:31	Nov 1, 2025	Caribe Royale, Orlando, Florida, U.S.	
3	Win	3–0	Alfredo Rodolfo Blanco	KO	3 (6) 2:35	Jul 19, 2025	Ford Center at the Star, Frisco, Texas, U.S.	
2	Win	2–0	William Jackson	KO	1 (6) 1:47	Apr 12, 2025	Boardwalk Hall, Atlantic City, New Jersey, U.S.	
1	Win	1–0	Alessio Mastronunzio	TKO	2 (6), 0:22	Mar 15, 2025	Caribe Royale, Orlando, Florida, U.S.	
