= Sagar Ahlawat =

Indian boxer (born 1998)

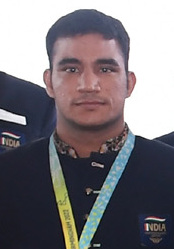
- Ahlawat in August 2022

Personal information
- Born: 30 October 1998 (age 27)
- Height: 188 cm (6 ft 2 in)

Sport
- Sport: Boxing
- Weight class: Super Heavyweight (92 kg)
Medal record
Boxing
Representing India
Commonwealth Games
Silver medal – second place	2022 Birmingham	Men's super heavyweight

Sagar Ahlawat (born 30 October 1998) is an Indian boxer who competes in Super Heavyweight category. He participated in the 2022 Commonwealth Games, being awarded the silver medal in the boxing competition. The score was 5–0.
