= Tuana'i =

- Village
- Location in Samoa
- Coordinates: 13°48′S 171°52′W
- Country: Samoa
- District: Tuamasaga
- Electoral Constituency: Sagaga Le Usoga

Population (2016)
  - Total: 1,407

Tuana'i is a small village on the central north coast of Upolu island in Samoa. It is situated to the west of Apia, the country's capital. The population is 1407.

Tuana'i village is part of Sagaga Le Usoga Electoral Constituency (Faipule District) which forms part of the larger political district of Tuamasaga.
