= Ato Plodzicki-Faoagali =

Samoan boxer (born 1999)

Personal information
- Nationality: Samoan
- Born: 18 February 1999 (age 27)
- Height: 1.85 m (6 ft 1 in)
- Weight: 81 kg (179 lb)

Boxing career

Boxing record
- Total fights: 2
- Wins: 2
- Win by KO: 1
- Losses: 0
- Draws: 0
Medal record
Men's amateur boxing
Representing Samoa
Commonwealth Games
Silver medal – second place	2022 Birmingham	Men's heavyweight
Silver medal – second place	2018 Gold Coast	Light heavyweight
Pacific Games
Gold medal – first place	2023 Honiara	Heavyweight
Gold medal – first place	2019 Apia	Light heavyweight

Tupuola Seua'i Ato Leau Plodzicki-Faoagali (born 18 February 1999) is a Samoan professional boxer. As an amateur, he represented Samoa at the Pacific Games, Commonwealth Games and the 2020 Summer Olympics.

== Amateur career ==
He competed at the 2019 Pacific Games, where he won gold in the light heavyweight division. The COVID-19 pandemic meant that he was not able to compete in any international tournaments in the leadup to the 2020 Olympics, but was able to train in Australia alongside fello Samoan boxer Marion Ah Tong. At the Olympics he was defeated by Belarusian Uladzislau Smiahlikau in his first fight. Following the 2020 Olympics he focused on selection for the 2022 Commonwealth Games in Birmingham. On 14 July 2022 he was selected as part of Samoa's team for the games. He reached the final in the heavyweight competition but was defeated by Lewis Williams and was awarded the silver medal.

== Professional boxing career ==
Plodzicki-Faoagali made his professional boxing debut on the 25th of November 2022 at Faleata Sports Complex in Apia, Samoa. Marion Faustino Ah Tong was also making his professional debut as the main undercard. Plodzicki-Faoagali took on Fijian boxer Apisai Naciqa. Plodzicki-Faoagali won the fight by TKO.

== Professional boxing record ==
2 fights	2 wins	0 losses
By knockout	1	0
By decision	1	0

No.	Result	Record	Opponent	Type	Round, time	Date	Location	Notes
2	Win	2–0	Jobe Ubitau	UD	4	23 Jun 2023	Tuana'imato Sports Complex, Apia, Samoa	
1	Win	1–0	Apisai Naciqa	TKO	3 (4)	25 Nov 2022	Faleata Sports Complex, Apia, Samoa	

== Personal life ==
Plodzicki-Faoagali was born in Sydney, Australia. He holds two matai titles: Tupuola from Sa'aga, Siumu and Seua'i from Tuana'i. He was born to a Samoan father and Polish mother.
