= Uila Mau'u =

New Zealand boxer (born 1992)

Leuila Mau'u
Personal information
- Full name: Leuila Mau'u
- Born: 10 January 1992 (age 34) South Auckland, Otara, New Zealand
- Height: 186 cm (6 ft 1 in) (76")
- Weight: 121 kg (267 lb)

Sport
- Country: New Zealand
- Sport: Boxing
- Weight class: Super heavyweight - Amateur Boxing
Medal record
Men's boxing
Representing New Zealand
Commonwealth Games
Bronze medal – third place	2022 Birmingham	Super heavyweight

Leuila Mau'u (born 10 January 1992) is a New Zealand amateur boxer. He won a bronze medal in the super heavyweight division at the 2022 Commonwealth Games in Birmingham. Mau'u also competed at the 2020 Asia & Oceania Boxing Olympic Qualification Tournament.

== Amateur titles ==
- Boxing NZ
  - 2019 Super Heavyweight New Zealand National Amateur Championships
- 2022 Commonwealth Games
  - Bronze Medal Boxing at the 2022 Commonwealth Games – Men's super heavyweight

== Boxing awards ==
- New Zealand Boxing Awards
  - 2022 Amateur Boxer of the year
