= Nalek Korbaj =

Venezuelan boxer (born 1995)

Personal information
- Born: 8 October 1995 (age 30) Mérida, Venezuela

Sport
- Sport: Boxing
Medal record
Representing Venezuela
Pan American Games
Bronze medal – third place	2019 Lima	Light heavyweight

Nalek Korbaj (born 8 October 1995) is a Venezuelan boxer. He competed in the men's light heavyweight event at the 2020 Summer Olympics.
