= Lasha Guruli =

Georgian boxer (born 1996)

Personal information
- Nationality: Georgian
- Born: 27 August 1996 (age 29) Rustavi, Georgia
- Height: 1.78 m (5 ft 10 in)

Boxing career
- Stance: Orthodox

Boxing record
- Total fights: 4
- Wins: 4
- Win by KO: 1
Medal record
Men's amateur boxing
Representing Georgia
Olympic Games
Bronze medal – third place	2024 Paris	63.5 kg
IBA World Championships
Bronze medal – third place	2021 Belgrade	65 kg
Bronze medal – third place	2023 Tashkent	65 kg
Bronze medal – third place	2025 Liverpool	65 kg
European Games
Silver medal – second place	2023 Kraków-Małopolska	63.5 kg
European Championships
Silver medal – second place	2022 Yerevan	65 kg
Silver medal – second place	2024 Belgrade	65 kg

Lasha Guruli (born 27 August 1996) is a Georgian boxer. He competed at the 2021 AIBA World Boxing Championships, winning the bronze medal in the welterweight event. He also competed at the 2022 European Amateur Boxing Championships, winning the silver medal in the welterweight event.

At the 2024 Summer Olympics, he won the bronze medal in the men's 63.5 kg event.

== Professional boxing career ==
His first fight as a professional took place on the 15th of March 2025 against Bernard Abbey in Georgia. Lasha won the fight on a unanimous decision after six rounds.

This was followed by a fight against James Francis at Wembley Stadium on 19 July 2025. Guruli won the fight by knocking his English opponent out in the fifth round.

== Professional boxing record ==
4 fights	4 wins	0 losses
By knockout	1	0
By decision	3	0

No.	Result	Record	Opponent	Type	Round, time	Date	Location	Notes
4	Win	4–0	(England) Liam Dillon	PTS	8	20 Jun 2026	St Mary's Stadium, Southampton, England	
3	Win	3-0	(Mexico) Benito Sanchez Garcia	UD	6	28 Feb 2026	Vaillant Live, Derby, England	
2	Win	2–0	(England) James Francis	RTD	5 (6), 0:02	19 Jul 2025	Wembley Stadium, London, England	
1	Win	1–0	(Ghana) Bernard Abbey	UD	6	15 Mar 2025	(Georgia (country)) Rustavi Sports Palace, Rustavi, Georgia	
