= Nguyễn Văn Đương =

Vietnamese boxer (born 1996)

Personal information
- Born: 2 October 1996 (age 29) Hoàng Thanh, Vietnam
- Height: 1.65 m (5 ft 5 in)
- Weight: Bantamweight; Featherweight

Boxing career
- Stance: Orthodox
Medal record
Men's amateur boxing
Representing Vietnam
Southeast Asian Games
Silver medal – second place	2019 Philippines	Bantamweight
Silver medal – second place	2025 Thailand	Featherweight

Nguyễn Văn Đương (born 2 October 1996) is a Vietnamese amateur boxer. He won a silver medal at the 2019 Southeast Asian Games and later qualified for the 2020 Summer Olympics.

== Early years ==
Đương was born in the village of Hoàng Thanh in northern Vietnam in 1996. At the age of 13, he accompanied his cousin to Hanoi, where he had been training at the People's Public Security boxing club. Đương was initially rejected because of his weight – he weighed only 32 kg at the time – but was allowed to join after two months of strength training. He competed in his first youth national championships in 2010, winning a gold medal.

== Career ==
In October 2019, Đương knocked out the previously undefeated Jenel Lausa on the main undercard of the Victory 8: Legends of Hoan Kiem event in Hanoi.

Đương won a silver medal in the bantamweight event at the 2019 Southeast Asian Games, defeating Nanthavong Simphavong of Laos and Naing Latt of Myanmar before losing to Thai legend Chatchai-decha Butdee in the final.

Three months later, Đương competed in the 2020 Asia & Oceania Olympic Qualification Tournament in Jordan. In his opening bout, he stopped Charlie Senior of Australia. In the quarterfinals, he shocked Chatchai-decha Butdee, beating him in only 47 seconds after scoring two quick knockdowns. Although Đương lost his semifinal matchup against Mohammad Al-Wadi by split decision, his two previous victories secured his spot at the 2020 Summer Olympics, making him the first-ever Vietnamese boxer to earn direct qualification to the competition (as opposed to a wild-card berth).

Đương also won back-to-back national championships in 2019 and 2020. He came in second place in a vote for Vietnam's "Most Valuable Athlete" of 2020, ranked only behind footballer Nguyễn Văn Quyết.
