= Sanil Shahi =

Sanil Shahi is a Nepali professional boxer from Ohmbahal, Kathmandu. He represented Nepal and won a Gold Medal at 2019 South Asian Games held in Nepal. He also represented Nepal Police Club.
