= Yuito Moriwaki =

Japanese boxer (born 1996)

Personal information
- Full name: 森脇唯人
- Nationality: Japanese
- Born: 8 August 1996 (age 30) Tokyo, Japan

Sport
- Sport: Boxing

Yuito Moriwaki (森脇唯人, born 8 August 1996) is a Japanese boxer. He competed in the men's middleweight event at the 2020 Summer Olympics.

== Professional boxing record ==
1 fight	1 win	0 losses
By decision	1	0

No.	Result	Record	Opponent	Type	Round, time	Date	Location	Notes
1	Win	1–0	Ha So Baek	UD	8	19 Jun 2025	Ota City General Gymnasium, Tokyo, Japan	
