= Chen Daxiang =

Chinese boxer (born 1996)

Personal information
- Nationality: Chinese
- Born: 27 January 1996 (age 29); Xuzhou, China

Sport
- Sport: Boxing

Chen Daxiang (born 27 January 1996) is a Chinese boxer. He competed in the men's light heavyweight event at the 2020 Summer Olympics.
