= Raykhona Kodirova =

Uzbek boxer

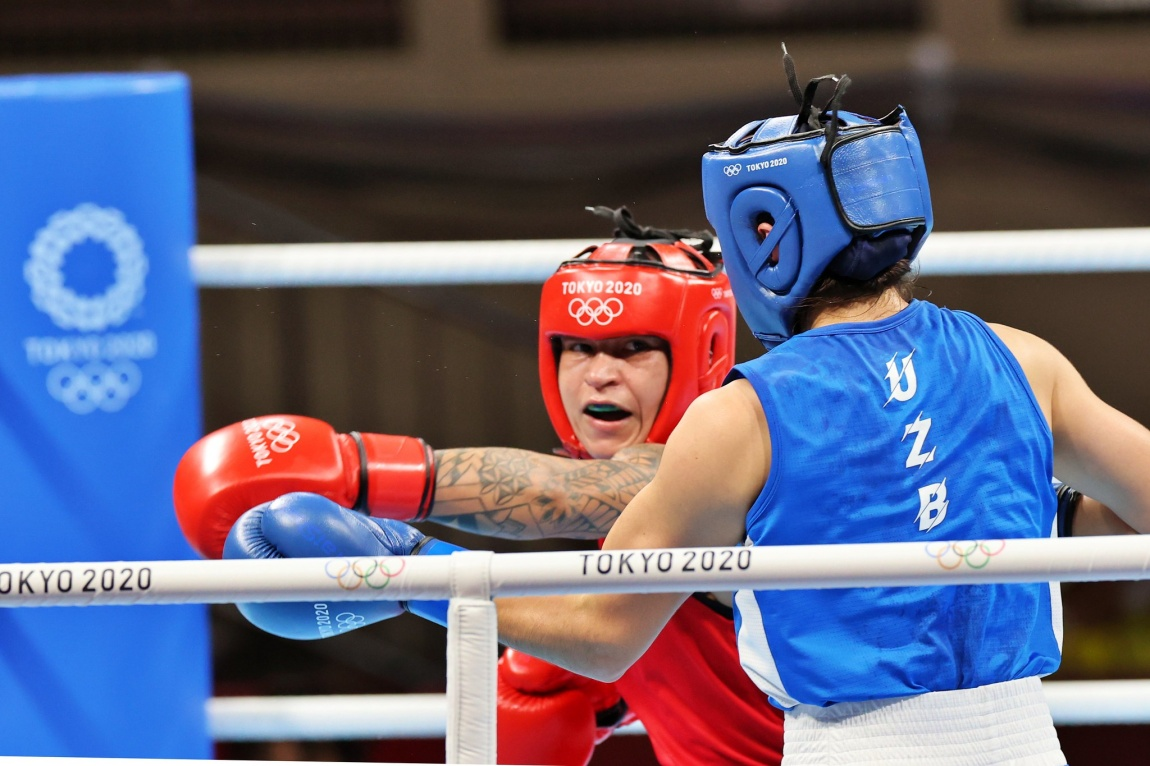
- Raykhona Kodirova (in blue) vs. Beatriz Ferreira at the 2020 Olympics

Personal information
- Nationality: Uzbek
- Born: 10 November 1993 (age 32) Tashkent, Uzbekistan

Boxing career
Medal record
Women's amateur boxing
World Military Boxing Championships
Bronze medal – third place	2021 Moscow	Lightweight

Raykhona Kodirova is an Uzbek boxer. She represented Uzbekistan at the 2020 Summer Olympics in Tokyo.

In 2018, Kodirova won a silver medal at an international tournament in Kyrgyzstan. In 2019, she was successful in the first round of the Women World Boxing Championships (under 60 kg) in Ulan-Ude with a 5–0 victory over Ana Starovoitova.
