= Paulo Aokuso =

Australian boxer

Personal information
- Nickname: Sweet P
- Nationality: Australian
- Born: 20 May 1997 (age 29) Sydney, Australia
- Height: 5 ft 11 in (180 cm)
- Weight: Light Heavyweight

Sport
- Sport: Boxing

Paulo Aokuso (born 20 May 1997) is an Australian boxer who competes in the light heavyweight division.

== Early life ==
Aokuso was born in Sydney, Australia to parents from Samoa and spent the early years of his life growing up in the western Sydney suburb of Mount Druitt. At the age of 12, he moved to Goodna, Queensland on the outskirts of Brisbane and attended St Peter Claver College throughout his teenage years. Aokuso initially played rugby league and dreamt of playing professionally before quitting the sport and trying boxing for the first time at the age of 17. He showed promising early signs as a boxer and joined the Queensland Academy of Sport's of boxing development program in 2014.

Aokuso's sister, Filoi, competed at the 2014 IAAF World Junior Championships finishing 7th in the discus throw and his younger brother, Austin, is also a professional boxer who competes in the cruiserweight division with a perfect 12-0 record as of November 2026. His nephew is professional rugby union player Joseph Sua'ali'i.

== Professional career ==
Following a successful amateur career that included an appearance at the 2020 Olympics in the light heavyweight division. where he lost narrowly on points to Spain's Gazimagomed Jalidov, Aokuso began his professional boxing career in April 2022 when he defeated Michael Van Nimwegen via fifth round knockout to claim the vacant Australian light-heavyweight championship. In November 2026, he recorded his 13th straight victory as a professional boxer to claim the IBF Inter-Continental Light Heavyweight championship and following his victory it was announced that Aokuso would be making his international debut on the Devin Haney vs Liam Paro undercard in San Francisco on December 19, 2026.

== Professional boxing record ==
| 13 fights | 13 wins | 0 losses |
|---|---|---|
| By knockout | 8 | 0 |
| By decision | 5 | 0 |

| No. | Result | Record | Opponent | Type | Round, time | Date | Location | Notes |
|---|---|---|---|---|---|---|---|---|
| 13 | Win | 13–0 | Mobin Khahrazeh | KO | 2 (10), 1:59 | Nov 6, 2026 | TikTok Entertainment Centre, Sydney, Australia | Retained IBF Inter-Continental light-heavyweight title |
| 12 | Win | 12–0 | Dou Wang | KO | 4 (10), 1:34 | Sep 2, 2026 | William Inglis Hotel, Sydney, Australia | |
| 11 | Win | 11–0 | Luis Antonio Tejeda | KO | 10 (10), 0:21 | Jul 26, 2026 | Afterpay Arena, Sydney, Australia | Won vacant IBF Inter-Continental light-heavyweight title |
| 10 | Win | 10–0 | Kittipong Jian Hao Ho | TKO | 1 (10), 2:20 | Apr 5, 2026 | WIN Entertainment Centre, Wollongong, Australia | Won vacant IBF Pan Pacific light-heavyweight title |
| 9 | Win | 9–0 | Shukhrat Abdullaev | UD | 6 | Dec 17, 2025 | TikTok Entertainment Centre, Sydney, Australia | |
| 8 | Win | 8–0 | Clay Waterman | MD | 10 | Nov 20, 2024 | Panthers Rugby League Club, Sydney, Australia | Won inaugural WBC Australasia light-heavyweight title |
| 7 | Win | 7–0 | Emmanuel Danso | TKO | 1 (10), 1:48 | Mar 23, 2024 | JBS Basketball Arena, Ipswich, Australia | |
| 6 | Win | 6–0 | Gabriel Omar Diaz | MD | 10 | Oct 7, 2023 | Townsville Entertainment and Convention Centre, Townsville, Australia | IBO Inter-Continental light-heavyweight title at stake only for Diaz as Aokuso missed weight |
| 5 | Win | 5–0 | Renold Quinlan | UD | 8 | Jul 19, 2023 | Hoops Capital, Sydney, Australia | |
| 4 | Win | 4–0 | Yunieski Gonzalez | UD | 10 | Mar 12, 2023 | Qudos Bank Arena, Sydney, Australia | Won vacant IBO Inter-Continental light-heavyweight title |
| 3 | Win | 3–0 | David Zegarra | TKO | 2 (10), 1:48 | Nov 23, 2022 | Aware Super Theatre, Sydney, Australia | |
| 2 | Win | 2–0 | Robert Berridge | TKO | 2 (10), 1:09 | Jun 29, 2022 | Convention & Exhibition Centre, Brisbane, Australia | Retained Australian light-heavyweight title |
| 1 | Win | 1–0 | Michael Van Nimwegen | TKO | 5 (8), 3:00 | Apr 6, 2022 | Hordern Pavilion, Sydney, Australia | Won vacant Australian light-heavyweight title |
