= Mönkhbatyn Myagmarjargal =

Mongolian boxer (born 1992)

Personal information
- Nationality: Mongolian
- Born: 3 March 1992 (age 33); Arvaikheer, Mongolia

Sport
- Sport: Boxing

Mönkhbatyn Myagmarjargal (Mongolian: Мөнхбатын Мягмаржаргал; born 3 March 1992) is a Mongolian boxer. She competed in the women's middleweight event at the 2020 Summer Olympics.
