= Danis Latypov =

Russian-born Bahraini boxer

Personal information
- Nationality: Bahrain
- Born: 28 September 1990 (age 34); Ishimbay, Russia

Sport
- Sport: Boxing

Danis Mansurovich Latypov (Russian: Данис Мансурович Латыпов, born 28 September 1990) is a Russian-born Bahraini boxer. He competed in the 2020 Summer Olympics. Latypov is of Tatar descent.
