= Siyovush Zukhurov =

Tajikistani boxer (born 1993)

Personal information
- Nationality: Tajikistani
- Born: 5 June 1993 (age 32); Dushanbe, Tajikistan

Sport
- Sport: Boxing

Siyovush Zukhurov (born 5 June 1993) is a Tajikistani boxer. He competed in the men's super heavyweight event at the 2020 Summer Olympics.
