= Imam Khataev =

Russian boxer (born 1994)

Personal information
- Full name: Imam Abdulayevich Khataev
- Nationality: Russia
- Born: 31 August 1994 (age 32) Kulary, Chechnya, Russia
- Height: 179 cm (5 ft 10 in)
- Weight: Light-heavyweight

Boxing career
- Sport: Boxing
- Stance: Orthodox

Boxing record
- Total fights: 14
- Wins: 13
- Win by KO: 12
- Losses: 1
Medal record
Men's Amateur Boxing
Representing (Russia) ROC
Olympic Games
| Bronze medal – third place | 2020 Tokyo | Light-heavyweight |
Representing Russia
World Championships
| Bronze medal – third place | 2023 Tashkent | Light heavyweight |

Imam Abdulayevich Khataev (Russian: Имам Абдулаевич Хатаев, IPA: [ɪˈmam xɐˈta(ɪ̯)ɪf]; born 31 August 1994) is a Russian boxer. He competed in the men's light heavyweight event at the 2020 Summer Olympics, where he was defeated by Briton Benjamin Whittaker by a score of 4–1 in the semifinals.

== Biography and career ==
Imam Khataev was born on August 31, 1994 in Kulary village, Chechen Republic. His first professional trainer was Shamil Batsagov.

In 2015 he participated in the Russian Championship in Samara.

In 2017 he received the title of Master of Sports of international class.

He turned pro in 2021, but continued to compete in the amateur ranks alongside his pro career until 2023, when he won the bronze medal at the World Boxing Championships in Uzbekistan. Since then, he has fought exclusively as a professional. He moved to Canada via Australia (unlike other Russian professional boxers who chose to base themselves in Germany) just before Russia's 2022 invasion of Ukraine.

Khataev won all of his first ten professional fights, including nine by KO. He eventually faced David Morrell on July 12, 2025, in New York City. A former WBA super-middleweight and light-heavyweight Regular champion, Morrell was considered a major step-up in class for Khataev. On July 8, the International Testing Agency, under the auspicies of the IBA, revealed that Khataev had tested positive for clomifene in April of that year. While Khataev was suspended for two years by the IBA, the bout was allowed to continue, evidently due to the IBA's limited jurisdiction.

Despite knocking Morrell down in the fifth round (the first knockdown of Morrell's career), Khataev lost a controversial 10-round split decision, handing him his first defeat.

Khataev is currently scheduled to face former world-title challenger Adam Deines on December 11, 2025, at the Lac Leamy Casino in Gatineau, Canada. Previously, he had been scheduled to face Richard Rivera, who dropped out due to an unspecified injury.

== Professional boxing record ==
| 14 fights | 13 wins | 1 loss |
|---|---|---|
| By knockout | 12 | 0 |
| By decision | 1 | 1 |

| No. | Result | Record | Opponent | Type | Round, time | Date | Location | Notes |
|---|---|---|---|---|---|---|---|---|
| 14 | Win | 13–1 | Padraig McCrory | KO | 1 (10), 1:09 | 8 Oct 2026 | Capitole de Quebec, Quebec City, Canada | Retained NABF light-heavyweight title |
| 13 | Win | 12–1 | Mickael Diallo | TKO | 1 (10), 3:00 | 4 Jun 2026 | Montreal Casino, Montreal, Canada | Retained NABF light-heavyweight title |
| 12 | Win | 11–1 | Adam Deines | TKO | 3 (10), 0:25 | 11 Dec 2025 | Lac Leamy Casino, Gatineau, Canada | Retained NABF light-heavyweight title |
| 11 | Loss | 10–1 | David Morrell Jr. | SD | 10 | 12 Jul 2025 | Louis Armstrong Stadium, New York City, New York, U.S. | |
| 10 | Win | 10–0 | Druval Palacios | UD | 10 | 22 Mar 2025 | Qudos Bank Arena, Sydney, Australia | |
| 9 | Win | 9–0 | Yunior Menendez | TKO | 3 (10) 1:30 | 7 Dec 2024 | SC Coliseum, Grozny, Russia | |
| 8 | Win | 8–0 | Ezequiel Maderna | TKO | 7 (10) 0:45 | 5 Sep 2024 | Montreal Casino, Montreal, Canada | Retained NABF light-heavyweight title |
| 7 | Win | 7–0 | Ričards Bolotņiks | TKO | 6 (10) 1:34 | 11 May 2024 | RAC Arena, Perth, Australia | |
| 6 | Win | 6–0 | Michał Ludwiczak | TKO | 2 (10) 2:17 | 13 Jan 2024 | Videotron Centre, Quebec City, Canada | Won vacant NABF light-heavyweight title |
| 5 | Win | 5–0 | Fernando Galvan | TKO | 2 (8) 0:44 | 14 Nov 2023 | Montreal Casino, Montreal, Canada | |
| 4 | Win | 4–0 | David Benitez | TKO | 3 (8) 2:30 | 11 Oct 2023 | Montreal Casino, Montreal, Canada | |
| 3 | Win | 3–0 | Gi Sung Gwak | TKO | 2 (8) 0:28 | 12 Mar 2023 | Qudos Bank Arena, Sydney, Australia | |
| 2 | Win | 2–0 | Adam Trenado | KO | 1 (8) 1:50 | 16 Jul 2022 | Lebane Square, Lebane, Serbia | |
| 1 | Win | 1–0 | Ismat Eynullayev | TKO | 1 (4) 2:03 | 3 Nov 2021 | Grozny, Russia | |
