= Shabbos Negmatulloev =

Tajikistani boxer (born 1997)

Personal information
- Nationality: Tajikistani
- Born: 21 September 1997 (age 28) Dushanbe, Tajikistan
- Height: 178 cm (5 ft 10 in)
- Weight: Light-heavyweight

Boxing career
- Stance: Orthodox
Medal record
Men's amateur boxing
Representing Tajikistan
Asian Championships
Bronze medal – third place	2021 Dubai	Light heavyweight

Shabbos Negmatulloev (born 21 September 1997) is a Tajikistani boxer. He competed in the men's light heavyweight event at the 2020 Summer Olympics.
