= Marion Faustino Ah Tong =

Samoan boxer

Personal information
- Nationality: Samoan
- Born: Marion Faustino Ah Tong; April 1, 2000 (age 26) Apia, Samoa
- Height: 168 cm (5 ft 6 in)
- Weight: Super Welterweight

Boxing career

Boxing record
- Total fights: 1
- Wins: 1
- Losses: 0
- Draws: 0

Marion Faustino Ah Tong (born 1 April 2000) is a Samoan boxing. He competed in the men's welterweight event at the 2020 Summer Olympics, but was eliminated on points by Zambian boxer Stephen Zimba.

== Amateur boxing ==
Ah Tong lives in Australia. The COVID-19 pandemic meant that he was not able to compete in any international tournaments in the leadup to the 2020 Olympics. On 14 July 2022 he was selected as part of Samoa's team for the 2022 Commonwealth Games in Birmingham.

== Professional boxing career ==
Ah Tong made his professional boxing debut on the 25th of November 2022 at Faleata Sports Complex in Apia, Samoa. Ato Plodzicki-Faoagali was also making his professional debut as the Main Event. Ah Tong took on Fijian boxer Ratu Rakuro also known as Rakuro Daunivavana. Ah Tong won the fight by Unanimous Decision.

== Professional boxing record ==
3 fights	3 wins	0 losses
By knockout	2	0
By decision	1	0

No.	Result	Record	Opponent	Type	Round, time	Date	Location	Notes
1	Win	1–0	Rakuro Daunivavana	UD	4	25 Nov 2022	Faleata Sports Complex, Apia, Samoa	
