= Tursunoy Rakhimova =

Uzbekistani boxer

Personal information
- Nationality: Uzbekistani
- Born: 5 June 1997 (age 28)

Sport
- Sport: Boxing

Tursunoy Rakhimova (born 5 June 1997) is an Uzbekistani boxer. She competed in the women's flyweight event at the 2020 Summer Olympics.
