= Ablaikhan Zhussupov =

Kazakhstani boxer (born 1997)

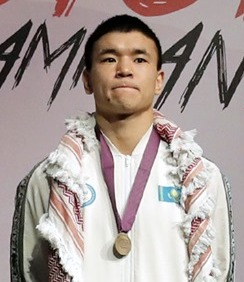
- Zhussupov in 2020

Personal information
- Nationality: Kazakhstani
- Born: 10 January 1997 (age 29) Abay, Kazakhstan
- Height: 1.79 m (5 ft 10 in)
- Weight: 69 kg (152 lb)

Boxing career

Boxing record
- Total fights: 73
- Wins: 62
- Win by KO: 0
- Losses: 11
- Draws: 0
- No contests: 0
Medal record
Men's amateur boxing
Representing Kazakhstan
IBA World Championships
Gold medal – first place	2025 Dubai	Light middleweight
Bronze medal – third place	2017 Hamburg	Welterweight
Bronze medal – third place	2019 Yekaterinburg	Welterweight
Bronze medal – third place	2021 Belgrade	Welterweight
Asian Championships
Silver medal – second place	2017 Tashkent	Welterweight
Silver medal – second place	2021 Dubai	Welterweight
Gold medal – first place	2024 Chiang Mai	Light middleweight
Youth World Championships
Gold medal – first place	2014 Sofia	Lightweight
Summer Youth Olympics
Gold medal – first place	2014 Nanjing	Lightweight

Ablaykhan Kayratovich Zhusupov (Kazakh: Абылайхан Қайратұлы Жүсіпов, romanized: Abylaihan Qairatūly Jüsıpov; born 10 January 1997) is a Kazakhstani boxer. He competed for Kazakhstan at the 2016 Summer Olympics in the men's light welterweight event. Zhusupov also represented Kazakhstan at the 2020 Summer Olympics in the men's welterweight event.
