= Sewon Okazawa =

Japanese boxer (born 1995)

Personal information
- Full name: Sewonrets Quincy Mensah Okazawa
- Nationality: Japanese
- Born: 21 December 1995 (age 30) Yamagata, Japan
- Height: 1.79 m (5 ft 10 in)

Sport
- Sport: Boxing
Medal record
Men's amateur boxing
Representing Japan
World Championships
Silver medal – second place	2025 Liverpool	70 kg
IBA World Championships
Gold medal – first place	2021 Belgrade	Welterweight
Asian Games
Gold medal – first place	2022 Hangzhou	Light middleweight
Asian Championships
Silver medal – second place	2019 Bangkok	Welterweight

Sewon Okazawa (岡澤 セオン) (born 21 December 1995) is a Japanese boxer. He competed in the men's welterweight event at the 2020 Summer Olympics.

== Personal life ==
He was born in Yamagata, Japan to a Ghanaian father and a Japanese mother.
