= Harry Garside =

Australian boxer (born 1997)

Personal information
- Nationality: Australian
- Born: Harrison Garside; 22 July 1997 (age 29) Ferntree Gully, Victoria, Australia
- Height: 1.76 m (5 ft 9 in)
- Weight: Lightweight

Boxing career
- Stance: Southpaw

Boxing record
- Total fights: 4
- Wins: 4
- Win by KO: 3
- Losses: 0
Medal record
Men's amateur boxing
Representing Australia
Olympic Games
Bronze medal – third place	2020 Tokyo	Lightweight
Commonwealth Games
Gold medal – first place	2018 Gold Coast	Lightweight
Pacific Games
Gold medal – first place	2023 Honiara	Light welterweight

Harrison Garside (born 22 July 1997) is an Australian boxer. He competed in the men's lightweight event at the 2020 Summer Olympics where he won the bronze medal. He also won the Gold Medal at the Gold Coast 2018 Commonwealth Games. This marked the first time in more than three decades that an Australian medaled in boxing at the Olympics.

== Early life ==
Garside lived in Lilydale, a suburb of Melbourne, Victoria, and began boxing at age 9. He was the youngest of three boys and was closest to his mother. He was inspired by the Olympic Spirit from a young age, having photos of Cathy Freeman and Ian Thorpe on his bedroom ceiling to inspire him.

Garside joined the Lilydale Youth Club which became his second home. He was at first to be an easy target and lost 10 of his first 18 fights. Garside harnessed an underdog mentality and he was motivated to train harder.

== Career ==
In 2015, Garside won his first of six Australian National Championships. In 2018 he competed at the 2018 Commonwealth Games where he won the gold medal in the men's 60 kg division.

As of 2021, Garside had won seven Australian national boxing championships.

After winning Bronze at the 2020 Summer Olympics, Garside turned professional, winning three fights, before returning to amateur boxing, aiming to compete at the 2024 Summer Olympics in Paris. He booked his place in the games after winning Gold at the 2023 Pacific Games in Honiara.

Garside competed in the 63.5kg class at the 2024 Summer Olympics, losing on points in the Round of 16 against Hungarian Richárd Kovács.

== Professional boxing record ==
4 fights	4 wins	0 losses
By knockout	3	0
By decision	1	0

No.	Result	Record	Opponent	Type	Round, time	Date	Location	Notes
4	Win	4–0	Charlie Bell	TKO	5 (6), 3:00	15 May 2025	Hordern Pavilion, Sydney, Australia	
3	Win	3–0	Layton McFerran	TKO	7 (10), 2:07	11 May 2022	Entertainment Centre, Newcastle, Australia	Retained Australian lightweight title
2	Win	2–0	Maneur Matet	UD	10	6 Apr 2022	Hordern Pavilion, Sydney, Australia	Won vacant Australian lightweight title
1	Win	1–0	Sachin Mudaliar	TKO	1 (6), 2:08	22 Dec 2021	The Star Event Centre, Sydney, Australia	

== Personal life ==
Garside is employed as a plumber. He wore nail polish during the 2020 Summer Olympics, citing his desire to defy gender stereotypes.

Garside is also known for challenging gender norms, often wearing skirts and dresses to awards shows and ceremonies. Though he has received a lot of backlash over this, Garside has stated that he hopes he is being a good advocate for the LGBTQIA+ community.

In 2022, Harry was the runner-up of the ninth season of the reality show I'm a Celebrity...Get Me Out of Here!, losing to netball player Liz Ellis.

In 2024, Garside published an autobiography called The Good Fight.
