= 2020 African Boxing Olympic Qualification Tournament =

Boxing competitions

- Venue: Dakar Arena
- Location: Diamniadio, Senegal
- Dates: 20–29 February
- Competitors: 198 from 38 nations

The 2020 African Boxing Olympic Qualification Tournament for the boxing tournament at the 2020 Summer Olympics in Tokyo, Japan was held in Diamniadio, Senegal from 20 to 29 February 2020.

== Medalists ==
=== Men ===
| Event | Gold | Silver | Bronze |
|---|---|---|---|
| −52 kg | Mohamed Flissi (ALG) | Patrick Chinyemba (ZAM) | Sulemanu Tetteh (GHA) |
| −57 kg | Everisto Mulenga (ZAM) | Nick Okoth (KEN) | Samuel Takyi (GHA) |
| −63 kg | Jonas Junias Jonas (NAM) | Richarno Colin (MRI) | Abdelhaq Nadir (MAR) |
| −69 kg | Albert Mengue (CMR) | Stephen Zimba (ZAM) | Shadiri Bwogi (UGA) |
| −75 kg | Younes Nemouchi (ALG) | David Tshama (COD) | Wilfried Ntsengue (CMR) |
| −81 kg | Abdelrahman Oraby (EGY) | Mohamed Houmri (ALG) | Mohamed Assaghir (MAR) |
| −91 kg | Youness Baalla (MAR) | Abdelhafid Benchabla (ALG) | Elly Ochola (KEN) |
| −91 kg | Youness Baalla (MAR) | Abdelhafid Benchabla (ALG) | Youssef Ali Karar (EGY) |
| +91 kg | Maxime Yegnong (CMR) | Chouaib Bouloudinat (ALG) | Bourous Ahmed (MAR) |
| +91 kg | Maxime Yegnong (CMR) | Chouaib Bouloudinat (ALG) | Agnes Keddy Evans (SEY) |

=== Women ===
| Event | Gold | Silver | Bronze |
|---|---|---|---|
| −51 kg | Rabab Cheddar (MAR) | Roumaysa Boualam (ALG) | Christine Ongare (KEN) |
| −57 kg | Khouloud Hlimi (TUN) | Keamogetse Kenosi (BOT) | Marcelat Sakobi Matshu (COD) |
| −57 kg | Khouloud Hlimi (TUN) | Keamogetse Kenosi (BOT) | Widad Bertal (MAR) |
| −60 kg | Imane Khelif (ALG) | Mariem Homrani (TUN) | Mariam Sidibé (CIV) |
| −60 kg | Imane Khelif (ALG) | Mariem Homrani (TUN) | Thérèse Naomie Yumba (COD) |
| −69 kg | Oumayma Bel Ahbib (MAR) | Acinda Panguana (MOZ) | Elizabeth Akinyi (KEN) |
| −69 kg | Oumayma Bel Ahbib (MAR) | Acinda Panguana (MOZ) | Emily Nakalema (UGA) |
| −75 kg | Khadija El-Mardi (MAR) | Rady Adosinda Gramane (MOZ) | Ichrak Chaib (ALG) |
| −75 kg | Khadija El-Mardi (MAR) | Rady Adosinda Gramane (MOZ) | Ornella Sathoud (GHA) |

== Qualification summary ==
| NOC | Men | | | | | | | | Women | | | | | Total |
| NOC | 52 | 57 | 63 | 69 | 75 | 81 | 91 | +91 | 51 | 57 | 60 | 69 | 75 | Total |
|---|---|---|---|---|---|---|---|---|---|---|---|---|---|---|
| Algeria | X | | | | X | X | X | X | X | | X | | | 7 |
| Botswana | | | | | | | | | | X | | | | 1 |
| Cameroon | | | | X | X | | | X | | | | | | 3 |
| Democratic Republic of the Congo | | | | | X | | | | | | | | | 1 |
| Egypt | | | | | | X | | | | | | | | 1 |
| Ghana | X | X | | | | | | | | | | | | 2 |
| Kenya | | X | | | | | | | X | | | | | 2 |
| Mauritius | | | X | | | | | | | | | | | 1 |
| Morocco | | | X | | | X | X | | X | | | X | X | 6 |
| Mozambique | | | | | | | | | | | | X | X | 2 |
| Namibia | | | X | | | | | | | | | | | 1 |
| Tunisia | | | | | | | | | | X | X | | | 2 |
| Uganda | | | | X | | | | | | | | | | 1 |
| Zambia | X | X | | X | | | | | | | | | | 3 |
| Total: 14 NOCs | 3 | 3 | 3 | 3 | 3 | 3 | 2 | 2 | 3 | 2 | 2 | 2 | 2 | 33 |

== Results ==
=== Men ===
==== Flyweight (52 kg) ====
Seeds

1. (Botswana) Rajab Mahommed (quarterfinals)
2. (Algeria) Mohamed Flissi (winner)
3. (Kenya) Shaffi Hassan (round of 16)
4. (Ethiopia) Dawit Bekele Wibshet (quarterfinals)

Preliminaries
| | Score | |
|---|---|---|
| Said Mortaji (MAR) | 5–0 | Muayid Abdulhakim Okashah (LBA) |
| Disan Mubiru (UGA) | 0–5 | Patrick Chinyemba (ZAM) |
| Tlholohelo Mokhesi (LES) | 0–5 | Junior Mikamou (GAB) |
| Sulemanu Tetteh (GHA) | RSC-I | Mostafa Galal (EGY) |
| Doudou Ilunga (COD) | 5–0 | Marco Jérôme Andrianarivelo (MAD) |

Round of 16
Rajab Mahommed (BOT) | 5
Said Mortaji (MAR) | 0
Juliano Máquina (MOZ) | 5
Bilel Boughanmi (TUN) | 0
Daniel De Pina (CPV) | 2
Patrick Chinyemba (ZAM) | 3
Junior Mikamou (GAB) | 0
Dawit Bekele Wibshet (ETH) | 5
Shaffi Hassan (KEN) | 2
Sulemanu Tetteh (GHA) | 3
Omar Jumale (SOM) | 0
Ndabezinhle Phiri (ZIM) | 5
Miguel Kembo (ANG) | 0
Nestor Thomas (NAM) | 5
Doudou Ilunga (COD) | 0
Mohamed Flissi (ALG) | 4

Quarterfinals
Rajab Mahommed (BOT) | 2
Juliano Máquina (MOZ) | 3
Patrick Chinyemba (ZAM) | 5
Dawit Bekele Wibshet (ETH) | 0
Sulemanu Tetteh (GHA) | 5
Ndabezinhle Phiri (ZIM) | 0
Nestor Thomas (NAM) | 0
Mohamed Flissi (ALG) | 5

Semifinals
Juliano Máquina (MOZ) | 1
Patrick Chinyemba (ZAM) | 4
Sulemanu Tetteh (GHA) | 0
Mohamed Flissi (ALG) | 5

Final
Patrick Chinyemba (ZAM) | 2
Mohamed Flissi (ALG) | 3
Third place
Juliano Máquina (MOZ) | 1
Sulemanu Tetteh (GHA) | 4

==== Featherweight (57 kg) ====
Seeds

1. (Morocco) Mohamed Hamout (quarterfinals)
2. (Uganda) Isaac Masembe (fourth place)
3. (Algeria) Oussama Mordjane (round of 16)
4. (Zambia) Everisto Mulenga (winner)

Preliminaries
| | Score | |
|---|---|---|
| Nathan Lunata (COD) | 5–0 | Zweli Dlamini (SWZ) |
| Ignas Aristide Tchouta Mbianda (CMR) | 0–5 | Musa Cham (GAM) |
| Moroke Mokhotho (LES) | 3–2 | Bilel Mhamdi (TUN) |
| Boniphace Kaji Malingwa (TAN) | 0–5 | Pedro Manuel Gomes (ANG) |
| Nick Okoth (KEN) | 4–1 | Wilson Carlos Semedo (CPV) |
| Franck Mombey (GAM) | RSC-I | Morning Ndevelo (NAM) |

Round of 16
Mohamed Hamout (MAR) | 5
Nathan Lunata (COD) | 0
Samuel Takyi (GHA) | 5
Yamikani Mtambo (MAW) | 0
Fikremariyam Yadesa Leta (ETH) | 4
Musa Cham (GAM) | 1
Moroke Mokhotho (LES) | 0
Everisto Mulenga (ZAM) | 5
Oussama Mordjane (ALG) | 0
Pedro Manuel Gomes (ANG) | 5
Nick Okoth (KEN) | 4
Mostafa Mohamed Fahmy Komsan (EGY) | 1
Felix Mendes Junior (GBS)
Kesaotshepa Maitewa (BOT) | RSC
Morning Ndevelo (NAM) | 2
Isaac Masembe (UGA) | 3

Quarterfinals
Mohamed Hamout (MAR) | 0
Samuel Takyi (GHA) | 5
Fikremariyam Yadesa Leta (ETH) | 0
Everisto Mulenga (ZAM) | 5
Pedro Manuel Gomes (ANG) | 0
Nick Okoth (KEN) | 5
Kesaotshepa Maitewa (BOT) | 0
Isaac Masembe (UGA) | 5

Semifinals
Samuel Takyi (GHA) | 1
Everisto Mulenga (ZAM) | 4
Nick Okoth (KEN) | 4
Isaac Masembe (UGA) | 1

Final
Everisto Mulenga (ZAM) | 4
Nick Okoth (KEN) | 1
Third place
Samuel Takyi (GHA) | 5
Isaac Masembe (UGA) | 0

==== Lightweight (63 kg) ====
Seeds

1. (Morocco) Abdelhaq Nadir (third place)
2. (Mauritius) Richarno Colin (second place)
3. (Democratic Republic of the Congo) Fiston Mbaya (fourth place)
4. (Namibia) Jonas Junias Jonas (winner)

Preliminaries
| | Score | |
|---|---|---|
| Abrham Alem Gebremariam (ETH) | RSC-I | Yasin Adnan (UGA) |
| Clinton Ndjinga (GAB) | 5–0 | Sabry Gamal Kamel Merdash (EGY) |
| Jorgito Ca (GBS) | 0–5 | Qhobosheane Mohlerepe (LES) |
| Abdul Omar (GHA) | 5–0 | Joseph Shigali (KEN) |
| Alex Isendi (TAN) | 5–0 | Almnsori Mahamed Hafith Farhat (LBA) |
| Ibrahima Diallo (GUI) | 5–0 | Diosdado Evita (GEQ) |
| Zakaria Diarra (MLI) | 0–5 | Brendon Denes (ZIM) |
| Matar Sambou (SEN) | 0–5 | Yahia Abdelli (ALG) |
| Akrem Ben Haj Aouina (TUN) | 5–0 | Steve Nsa'amang (CMR) |

Round of 16
Abdelhaq Nadir (MAR) | 5
Yasin Adnan (UGA) | 0
Clinton Ndjinga (GAB) | 0
Qhobosheane Mohlerepe (LES) | 5
Carlos Muçamba (MOZ) | 0
Abdul Omar (GHA) | 5
Alex Isendi (TAN) | 0
Jonas Junias Jonas (NAM) | 5
Fiston Mbaya (COD) | 5
Ibrahima Diallo (GUI) | 0
Brendon Denes (ZIM) | 5
Harvey Mkacha (MAW) | 0
Kabo Seitshiro (BOT) | 0
Yahia Abdelli (ALG) | 5
Akrem Ben Haj Aouina (TUN) | 0
Richarno Colin (MRI) | 5

Quarterfinals
Abdelhaq Nadir (MAR) | 5
Qhobosheane Mohlerepe (LES) | 0
Abdul Omar (GHA) | 0
Jonas Junias Jonas (NAM) | 5
Fiston Mbaya (COD) | 4
Brendon Denes (ZIM) | 1
Yahia Abdelli (ALG) | 0
Richarno Colin (MRI) | 5

Semifinals
Abdelhaq Nadir (MAR) | 2
Jonas Junias Jonas (NAM) | 3
Fiston Mbaya (COD) | 1
Richarno Colin (MRI) | 4

Final
Jonas Junias Jonas (NAM) | 4
Richarno Colin (MRI) | 1
Third place
Abdelhaq Nadir (MAR) | 4
Fiston Mbaya (COD) | 1

==== Welterweight (69 kg) ====
Seeds

1. (Mauritius) Merven Clair (quarterfinals)
2. (Democratic Republic of the Congo) Idriss Kapenga Nsaka (round of 16)
3. (Kenya) Boniface Mogunde Maina (round of 16)
4. (Algeria) Chemseddine Kramou (round of 16)

Preliminaries
| | Score | |
|---|---|---|
| Mmusi Tswiige (BOT) | 5–0 | Yannick Mitoumba (GAB) |
| Snowden Munyanje (MAW) | 0–5 | Stephen Zimba (ZAM) |
| Omar Elsayed Ragab (EGY) | 5–0 | Ahmed Mejri (TUN) |
| Nestor Nduwarugira (BDI) | 0–5 | Freeman Mabvongwe (ZIM) |
| Mohamed Aboubacar (COM) | 0–5 | Jessie Lartey (GHA) |
| Albert Mengue (CMR) | 5–0 | Zinelabiddine Amroug (MAR) |
| Madala Tounkara (MLI) | 0–5 | Thabiso Dlamini (SWZ) |
| Mesfin Keralah (ETH) | 5–0 | Brice Bassole (BUR) |
| Dawku Asim Salih Amhimmid (LBA) | RSC | Nafital Goma (ANG) |

Round of 16
Merven Clair (MRI) | 5
Mmusi Tswiige (BOT) | 0
Stephen Zimba (ZAM) | 5
Omar Elsayed Ragab (EGY) | 0
Mokhachane Moshoeshoe (LES) | 5
Freeman Mabvongwe (ZIM) | 0
Jessie Lartey (GHA) | 4
Chemseddine Kramou (ALG) | 1
Boniface Mogunde Maina (KEN)
Albert Mengue (CMR) | RSC
Thabiso Dlamini (SWZ) | 4
Mohamed Konaté (GUI) | 1
Shadir Musa Bwogi (UGA) | 4
Mesfin Keralah (ETH) | 1
Nafital Goma (ANG) | 5
Idriss Kapenga Nsaka (COD) | 0

Quarterfinals
Merven Clair (MRI)
Stephen Zimba (ZAM) | RSC
Mokhachane Moshoeshoe (LES) | 0
Jessie Lartey (GHA) | 5
Albert Mengue (CMR) | 5
Thabiso Dlamini (SWZ) | 0
Shadir Musa Bwogi (UGA) | 5
Nafital Goma (ANG) | 0

Semifinals
Stephen Zimba (ZAM) | 5
Jessie Lartey (GHA) | 0
Albert Mengue (CMR) | 5
Shadir Musa Bwogi (UGA) | 0

Final
Stephen Zimba (ZAM) | 1
Albert Mengue (CMR) | 4
Third place
Jessie Lartey (GHA) | 0
Shadir Musa Bwogi (UGA) | 5

==== Middleweight (75 kg) ====
Seeds

1. (Uganda) Kawuma Ssemujju (fourth place)
2. (Egypt) Hossam Aly (round of 16)
3. (Equatorial Guinea) Raul Abaga (quarterfinals)
4. (Algeria) Younes Nemouchi (winner)

Preliminaries
| | Score | |
|---|---|---|
| Rayton Okwiri (KEN) | 5–0 | Salem Elmagasbi Emhemed (LBA) |
| Pape Mamadou Ndiaye (SEN) | 0–5 | Eduardo Daniel (ANG) |
| Abubakari Quartey (GHA) | 5–0 | Adan Ahmed Mohamed (SOM) |
| Mohammed Diaby (MLI) | 0–5 | David Tshama (COD) |

Round of 16
Kawuma Ssemujju (UGA) | 3
Rayton Okwiri (KEN) | 2
Anas Amrani Ezzerrifi (MAR) | RSC
Temesgen Mitiku (ETH)
Jean-Luc Rosalba (MRI) | WO
Foday Badjie (GAM)
Eduardo Daniel (ANG) | 0
Younes Nemouchi (ALG) | 5
Raul Abaga (GEQ) | 3
Abubakari Quartey (GHA) | 2
Wilfried Ntsengue (CMR) | 5
Bruno Menie Nzue Ndong (GAB) | 0
Arena Pakela (LES) | 5
Mdahoma Mohamed (COM) | 0
David Tshama (COD) | 3
Hossam Aly (EGY) | 2

Quarterfinals
Kawuma Ssemujju (UGA) | ABD
Anas Amrani Ezzerrifi (MAR)
Jean-Luc Rosalba (MRI)
Younes Nemouchi (ALG) | RSC
Raul Abaga (GEQ) | 0
Wilfried Ntsengue (CMR) | 5
Arena Pakela (LES) | 0
David Tshama (COD) | 5

Semifinals
Kawuma Ssemujju (UGA) | 1
Younes Nemouchi (ALG) | 4
Wilfried Ntsengue (CMR) | 0
David Tshama (COD) | 5

Final
Younes Nemouchi (ALG) | 4
David Tshama (COD) | 1
Third place
Kawuma Ssemujju (UGA) | 2
Wilfried Ntsengue (CMR) | 3

==== Light heavyweight (81 kg) ====
Seeds

1. (Egypt) Abdelrahman Oraby (winner)
2. (Algeria) Mohamed Houmri (second place)
3. (Democratic Republic of the Congo) Peter Pita (quarterfinals)
4. (Ghana) Shakul Samed (fourth place)

Round of 16
Seyfe Kebede Kasto (ETH) | 4
Mohamadou Gory (MLI) | 0
Yusuf Changalawe (TAN) | 5
Mauricio Paulo Martins (ANG) | 0
Souleymane Sy (SEN) | 0
Shakul Samed (GHA) | 5
Humphrey Ochieng (KEN) | 1
Mohamed Assaghir (MAR) | 4
Joshua Arthur Male (UGA) | 0
Pedro Cuca (ANG) | 5

Quarterfinals
Abdelrahman Oraby (EGY) | 5
Seyfe Kebede Kasto (ETH) | 0
Yusuf Changalawe (TAN) | 0
Shakul Samed (GHA) | 5
Pita Kabeji (COD) | 2
Mohamed Assaghir (MAR) | 3
Pedro Cuca (ANG) | 0
Mohamed Houmri (ALG) | 5

Semifinals
Abdelrahman Oraby (EGY) | 3
Shakul Samed (GHA) | 2
Mohamed Assaghir (MAR) | 0
Mohamed Houmri (ALG) | 5

Final
Abdelrahman Oraby (EGY) | WO
Mohamed Houmri (ALG)
Third place
Shakul Samed (GHA) | 0
Mohamed Assaghir (MAR) | 5

==== Heavyweight (91 kg) ====
Seeds

1. (Algeria) Abdelhafid Benchabla (second place)
2. (Morocco) Youness Baalla (winner)
3. (Kenya) Elly Ochola (semifinals)
4. (Egypt) Youssef Ali Karar (semifinals)

Round of 16
Ibrahima Barry (GUI) | 3
David Bawah Akankolim (GHA) | 2
Maroy Sadiki (COD) | RSC
Sandy Sam Sanyang (GAM)
Luvumbo Kiala Junior (ANG) | 2
Alexander Bwambale (UGA) | 3

Quarterfinals
Abdelhafid Benchabla (ALG) | 5
Ibrahima Barry (GUI) | 0
Karamba Kebe (SEN) | 0
Youssef Ali Karar (EGY) | 5
Elly Ochola (KEN) | 3
Maroy Sadiki (COD) | 2
Alexander Bwambale (UGA) | 1
Youness Baalla (MAR) | 4

Semifinals
Abdelhafid Benchabla (ALG) | 5
Youssef Ali Karar (EGY) | 0
Elly Ochola (KEN) | 1
Youness Baalla (MAR) | 4

Final
Abdelhafid Benchabla (ALG)
Youness Baalla (MAR) | WO

==== Super heavyweight (+91 kg) ====
Seeds

1. (Egypt) Yousry Hafez (quarterfinals)
2. (Algeria) Chouaib Bouloudinat (second place)
3. (Democratic Republic of the Congo) Jeamie Tshikeva (quarterfinals)
4. (Kenya) Fredrick Ramogi (quarterfinals)

Round of 16
Solomon Geko Kozaala (UGA) | 0
Maxime Yegnong (CMR) | 5
Keddy Evans (SEY) | 5
Davilson Morais (CPV) | 0
Anani Kutsuke (GHA) | 5
Haruna Mhando Swanga (TAN) | 0

Quarterfinals
Yousry Hafez (EGY) | 2
Maxime Yegnong (CMR) | 3
Ahmed Bourous (MAR) | 5
Fredrick Ramogi (KEN) | 0
Jeamie Tshikeva (COD) | 2
Keddy Agnes (SEY) | 3
Anani Kutsuke (GHA) | 1
Chouaib Bouloudinat (ALG) | 4

Semifinals
Maxime Yegnong (CMR) | 5
Ahmed Bourous (MAR) | 0
Keddy Agnes (SEY) | 0
Chouaib Bouloudinat (ALG) | 5

Final
Maxime Yegnong (CMR) | 4
Chouaib Bouloudinat (ALG) | 1

=== Women ===
==== Flyweight (51 kg) ====
Seeds

1. (Algeria) Roumaysa Boualam (second place)
2. (Democratic Republic of the Congo) Modestine Munga Zalia (quarterfinals)
3. (Morocco) Rabab Cheddar (winner)

Round of 16
Amel Chebbi (TUN) | 0
Lethabo Modukanele (BOT) | 5
Macringue Benilde Regina Fernando (MOZ) | 4
Agerie Emagnu Bayew (ETH) | 1
Christine Ongare (KEN) | 5
Ornella Havyarimana (BDI) | 0

Quarterfinals
Roumaysa Boualam (ALG) | 5
Lethabo Modukanele (BOT) | 0
Khadidja Timera (SEN) | 2
Catherine Nanziri (UGA) | 3
Rabab Cheddar (MAR) | 5
Macringue Benilde Regina Fernando (MOZ) | 0
Christine Ongare (KEN) | 5
Modestine Munga Zalia (COD) | 0

Semifinals
Roumaysa Boualam (ALG) | RSC
Catherine Nanziri (UGA)
Rabab Cheddar (MAR) | 5
Christine Ongare (KEN) | 0

Final
Roumaysa Boualam (ALG) | 0
Rabab Cheddar (MAR) | 5
Third place
Catherine Nanziri (UGA) | 0
Christine Ongare (KEN) | 5

==== Featherweight (57 kg) ====
Seeds

1. (Botswana) Keamogetse Kenosi (final)
2. (Tunisia) Khouloud Hlimi (winner)
3. (Mali) Marine Fatoumata Camara (quarterfinals)
4. (Cameroon) Dorine Stéphane Mambou (quarterfinals)

Round of 16
Fatima Zahra Senouci (ALG) | RSC
Marie Madeleine Rasoarinoro (MAD)
Marcelat Sakobi Matshu (COD) | 5
Suzan Akello (UGA) | 0
Beatrice Akoth (KEN) | 0
Ramla Ali (SOM) | 5

Quarterfinals
Keamogetse Kenosi (BOT) | 5
Fatima Zahra Senouci (ALG) | 0
Widad Bertal (MAR) | 3
Dorine Stéphane Mambou (CMR) | 0
Marine Fatoumata Camara (MLI) | 1
Marcelat Sakobi Matshu (COD) | 4
Ramla Ali (SOM) | 1
Khouloud Hlimi (TUN) | 4

Semifinals
Keamogetse Kenosi (BOT) | 5
Widad Bertal (MAR) | 0
Marcelat Sakobi Matshu (COD) | 0
Khouloud Hlimi (TUN) | 5

Final
Keamogetse Kenosi (BOT) | 0
Khouloud Hlimi (TUN) | 5

==== Lightweight (60 kg) ====
Seeds

1. (Botswana) Aratwa Kasemang (quarterfinals)
2. (Democratic Republic of the Congo) Thérèse Naomie Yumba (semifinals)
3. (Sierra Leone) Deedra Arvella Chestnut (quarterfinals)

Round of 16
Imane Khelif (ALG) | 5
Israel Rebecca Among (UGA) | 0
Marie Noël Diarra (MLI)
Chaymae Rhaddi (MAR) | RSC

Quarterfinals
Aratwa Kasemang (BOT) | 0
Imane Khelif (ALG) | 5
Mariam Sidibé (CIV) | 5
Everline Oloo (KEN) | 0
Deedra Arvella Chestnut (SLE)
Mariem Homrani (TUN) | RSC
Chaymae Rhaddi (MAR) | 2
Thérèse Naomie Yumba (COD) | 3

Semifinals
Imane Khelif (ALG) | 5
Mariam Sidibé (CIV) | 0
Mariem Homrani (TUN) | RSC
Thérèse Naomie Yumba (COD)

Final
Imane Khelif (ALG) | 5
Mariem Homrani (TUN) | 0

==== Welterweight (69 kg) ====
Seeds

1. (Morocco) Oumayma Bel Ahbib (winner)
2. (Mozambique) Acinda Panguana (final)
3. (Cape Verde) Ivanusa Moreira (quarterfinals)

Round of 16
Bernadette Keuye (CMR) | 4
Jorbelle Malewu (COD) | 0
Sedja Sanogo (CIV) | 3
Sarra Kali (ALG) | 2

Quarterfinals
Oumayma Bel Ahbib (MAR) | 5
Bernadette Keuye (CMR) | 0
Faruza Osuman (GHA) | 0
Elizabeth Akinyi (KEN) | 5
Ivanusa Moreira (CPV) | 0
Emily Nakalema (UGA) | 5
Sedja Sanogo (CIV) | 0
Acinda Panguana (MOZ) | 5

Semifinals
Oumayma Bel Ahbib (MAR) | 5
Elizabeth Akinyi (KEN) | 0
Emily Nakalema (UGA) | 0
Acinda Panguana (MOZ) | 5

Final
Oumayma Bel Ahbib (MAR) | 4
Acinda Panguana (MOZ) | 1

==== Middleweight (75 kg) ====
Seeds

1. (Morocco) Khadija El-Mardi (winner)
2. (Mozambique) Rady Adosinda Gramane (second place)

| Quarterfinals | | Semifinals | | Final |
| Khadija El-Mardi (MAR) | 5 |
| Clotilde Essiane (CMR) | 0 | Khadija El-Mardi (MAR) | 5 |
| Ichrak Chaib (ALG) | 5 | Ichrak Chaib (ALG) | 0 |
| Marie Joël Mwika (COD) | 0 | | | Khadija El-Mardi (MAR) | 5 |
| Ornella Sathoud (GHA) | RSC | | | Rady Adosinda Gramane (MOZ) | 0 |
| Doreen Nassali (UGA) | | Ornella Sathoud (GHA) | 0 |
| Elizabeth Andiego (KEN) | 2 | Rady Adosinda Gramane (MOZ) | 5 |
| Rady Adosinda Gramane (MOZ) | 3 |
