= 2022 African Amateur Boxing Championships =

Boxing event in Maputo, Mozambique

- Venue: Pavilhäo de Académica
- Location: Maputo, Mozambique
- Dates: 12–17 September 2022
- Competitors: 211 from 24 nations

The 2022 African Amateur Boxing Championships was 20th men's edition and 5th women's edition African Amateur Boxing Championships. It took place in Maputo, Mozambique from 12 to 17 September 2022.

The competition saw the application of a new system for counting points, namely the scoring-machine, which counts all the medals won by teams, by granting each medal a certain number of points, Algeria became champions by teams with 41 pts.

== Participating nations ==
- Algeria (18)
- Botswana (9)
- Burundi (7)
- Cameroon (15)
- Cape Verde (2)
- Central African Republic (2)
- Democratic Republic of the Congo (14)
- Egypt (8)
- Equatorial Guinea (2)
- Eswatini (7)
- Guinea (5)
- Kenya (8)
- Mali (4)
- Mauritius (3)
- Morocco (9)
- Mozambique (21)
- Senegal (1)
- Seychelles (5)
- Sierra Leone (1)
- Somalia (14)
- South Africa (17)
- Sudan (4)
- Uganda (7)
- Zambia (12)

== Medal table ==
* – Host nation (Mozambique)

Rank	Nation	Gold	Silver	Bronze	Total	Pts
1	Algeria	4	5	6	15	41
2	Mozambique*	5	0	2	7	30
3	Zambia	4	0	3	7	28
4	Morocco	2	5	2	9	
5	Cameroon	2	3	4	9	
5	DR Congo	2	3	4	9	
7	Botswana	1	2	3	6	
8	South Africa	1	0	9	10	
9	Mauritius	1	1	0	2	
10	Egypt	1	0	3	4	
11	Sierra Leone	1	0	0	1	
12	Kenya	0	3	1	4	
13	Cape Verde	0	1	1	2	
14	Burundi	0	1	0	1	
15	Guinea	0	0	2	2	
15	Uganda	0	0	2	2	
17	Senegal	0	0	1	1	
17	Seychelles	0	0	1	1	
Total		11	11	22	44	

== Medalists ==
Event	Gold	Silver	Bronze
Men
M48 kg	Yassine Issufo (MOZ)	Marcial Wouang (CMR)	Lubabalo Lusizi (RSA); Kobamelo Molatlhegi (BOT)
M51 kg	Patrick Chinyemba (ZAM)	Said Mortaji (MAR)	Sinovuyo Mtintelwa (RSA); Mohammed Moziane (ALG)
M54 kg	Tiisetso Matikinca (RSA)	George Molwantwa (BOT)	David Pina (CPV); Hichem Maouch (ALG)
M57 kg	Armando Sigaúque (MOZ)	Samuel Wairimu (KEN)	Ben Banda (ZAM); Jonathan Kyobe (UGA)
M60 kg	Andrew Chilata (ZAM)	Nicholas Okoth (KEN)	Walid Tarzout (ALG); Sanele Sogcwayi (RSA)
M63.5 kg	Louis Colin (MRI)	Yahia Abdelli (ALG)	Alseny Conté (GUI); Abdelhaq Nadir (MAR)
M67 kg	Jugurtha Ait baka (ALG)	Patrick Ngueumaleu (CMR)	Paulo Britos (MOZ); Omar Elsayed (EGY)
M71 kg	Hamza El Barbari (MAR)	Merven Clair (MRI)	Boniface Mogunde (KEN); Youcef Yaiche (ALG)
M75 kg	David Tshama (COD)	Driss Gharroumi (MAR)	Yusuf Nkobeza (UGA); Simnikiwe Bongco (RSA)
M80 kg	Pita Kabeji (COD)	Mohamed Assaghir (MAR)	Abdelrahman Salah (EGY); Junior Fotouo (CMR)
M86 kg	Albino Gabriel (MOZ)	Arouna Ntosengeh (CMR)	Landry Matete (COD); Bonginkosi Nhlapho (RSA)
M92 kg	Paul Donatien (CMR)	Chapiteau Dimuntu (COD)	Ali Elsalamony (EGY); Ibrahima Sory (GUI)
M92+ kg	Yousry Hafez (EGY)	Mourad Kadi (ALG)	Serge Nvogo (CMR); Diarga Baldé (SEN)
Women
W48 kg	Margret Tembo (ZAM)	Fatiha Mansouri (ALG)	Christine Akoa (CMR); Lethabo Modukanele (BOT)
W50 kg	Roumaysa Boualam (ALG)	Rabab Cheddar (MAR)	Helena Bagâo (MOZ); Elizabeth Phiri (ZAM)
W52 kg	Reine Ngoune (CMR)	Ornella Havyarimana (BDI)	Souha Miloudi (ALG)
W54 kg	Sara Haghighat-Joo (SLE)	Fatma Abdelkader (ALG)	Widad Bertal (MAR); Phekie Bele (BOT)
W57 kg	Keamogetse Kenosi (BOT)	Marcelat Sakobi (COD)	Phiwokuhle Mnguni (RSA); Juliana Kasonka (ZAM)
W60 kg	Felistars Nkandu (ZAM)	Chaymae Rhaddi (MAR)	Hadjila Khelif (ALG)
W63 kg	Imane Khelif (ALG)	Aratwa Kasemang (BOT)	Naomie Yumba (COD); Pamela Mayoli (RSA)
W66 kg	Ichrak Chaib (ALG)	Ivanusa Gomes (CPV)	Not awarded
W70 kg	Alcinda Panguana (MOZ)	Brigitte Mbabi (COD)	Clotilde Essiane (CMR); Ariana Memee (SEY)
W75 kg	Rady Gramane (MOZ)	Djouher Benan (ALG)	Jorbelle Malewu (COD); Geanne Dicks (RSA)
W81+ kg	Khadija Mardi (MAR)	Elizabeth Andiego (KEN)	Mkateko Sithole (RSA); Kanjinga Kambala (COD)

== Draw sheets ==
=== M48 kg ===
Semifinals		Final
Marcial Wouang (CMR)	RSC
Lubabalo Lusizi (RSA)		Marcial Wouang (CMR)	0
Yassine Issufo (MOZ)	3	Yassine Issufo (MOZ)	5
Kobamelo Molatlhegi (BOT)	2

=== M51 kg ===
First round
Sinovuyo Mtintelwa (RSA)	5
David Karanja (KEN)	0
Mohammed Moziane (ALG)	4
Otukile Mahomed (BOT)	1

Quarterfinals
Sabelo Lukhele (SWZ)	1
Sinovuyo Mtintelwa (RSA)	4
Said Mortaji (MAR)	4
Mouhaman Issouhou (CMR)	1
Patrick Chinyemba (ZAM)	RSC
Alváro António (MOZ)
Mohammed Moziane (ALG)	5
Moussa Nimubona (BDI)	0

Semifinals
Sinovuyo Mtintelwa (RSA)	0
Said Mortaji (MAR)	3
Patrick Chinyemba (ZAM)	5
Mohammed Moziane (ALG)	0

Final
Said Mortaji (MAR)
Patrick Chinyemba (ZAM)	WO

=== M54 kg ===
First round
Kelvin Hachilala (ZAM)	1
David Pina (CPV)	4
Muntu Simelane (SWZ)	WO
Marcel Muntu (COD)
George Molwantwa (BOT)	RSC
Romano Moustache (SEY)

Quarterfinals
Ivo Nhaguiombe (MOZ)	0
David Pina (CPV)	4
Tiisetso Matikinca (RSA)	5
Ahmed Ismail (EGY)	0
Hichem Maouch (ALG)	RSC
Muntu Simelane (SWZ)
George Molwantwa (BOT)	4
Shaffi Hassan (KEN)	1

Semifinals
David Pina (CPV)	0
Tiisetso Matikinca (RSA)	5
Hichem Maouch (ALG)	0
George Molwantwa (BOT)	4

Final
Tiisetso Matikinca (RSA)	5
George Molwantwa (BOT)	0

=== M57 kg ===
Quarterfinals
Samuel Wairimu (KEN)	RSC
Aly Doumbouya (GUI)
Zwel Dlamini (SWZ)	0
Ben Banda (ZAM)	5
Omar Abozaid (EGY)
Armando Sigaúque (MOZ)	KO
Ignas Tchouta (CMR)	1
Jonathan Kyobe (UGA)	4

Semifinals
Samuel Wairimu (KEN)	RSC
Ben Banda (ZAM)
Armando Sigaúque (MOZ)	3
Jonathan Kyobe (UGA)	2

Final
Samuel Wairimu (KEN)	2
Armando Sigaúque (MOZ)	3

=== M60 kg ===
First round
Alpha Sow (GUI)	2
Rosalindo Okon (GEQ)	3
Jean Agathe (MRI)	5
Naimo Cumbane (MOZ)	0
Wadah Mahmoud (SUD)
Nicholas Okoth (KEN)	WO
Alain Sangue (CMR)	0
Andrew Chilata (ZAM)	5
Lesego Lere (BOT)
Abdoul Bathily (MLI)	RSC
Djafari Nshimirima (BDI)	0
Chawe Gamedze (SWZ)	5

Quarterfinals
Walid Tarzout (ALG)	WO
Rosalindo Okon (GEQ)
Jean Agathe (MRI)	1
Nicholas Okoth (KEN)	4
Andrew Chilata (ZAM)	5
Abdoul Bathily (MLI)	0
Chawe Gamedze (SWZ)
Sanele Sogcwayi (RSA)	RSC

Semifinals
Walid Tarzout (ALG)
Nicholas Okoth (KEN)	RSC
Andrew Chilata (ZAM)	RSC
Sanele Sogcwayi (RSA)

Final
Nicholas Okoth (KEN)	2
Andrew Chilata (ZAM)	3

=== M63.5 kg ===
First round
John Masamba (RSA)	WO
Boniface Zengala (COD)
Joshua Tukamuhebwa (UGA)	RSC
Come Horonfei (CAF)
Mohanad Jaber (SUD)
Louis Colin (MRI)	WO
Yahia Abdelli (ALG)	5
Mohamed Oumarou (CMR)	0
Daouda Sidibé (MLI)
Abdelhaq Nadir (MAR)	RSC

Quarterfinals
Alseny Conté (GUI)	KO
John Masamba (RSA)
Joshua Tukamuhebwa (UGA)	0
Louis Colin (MRI)	5
Eric Mahatane (BDI)	0
Yahia Abdelli (ALG)	5
Abdelhaq Nadir (MAR)	3
Emmanuel Katema (ZAM)	2

Semifinals
Alseny Conté (GUI)
Louis Colin (MRI)	KO
Yahia Abdelli (ALG)	RSC
Abdelhaq Nadir (MAR)

Final
Louis Colin (MRI)	RSC
Yahia Abdelli (ALG)

=== M67 kg ===
First round
Baudoin Dassinou (CAF)	0
Thabiso Dlamini (SWZ)	5
Shain Boniface (SEY)	0
Shaft Mwandwe (ZAM)	5
Owen Kibira (UGA)	WO
Fiston Mbaya (COD)

Quarterfinals
Paulo Britos (MOZ)	RSC
Thabiso Dlamini (SWZ)
Patrick Ngueumaleu (CMR)	RSC
Rally Irakoze (BDI)
Jugurtha Ait (ALG)	5
Shaft Mwandwe (ZAM)	0
Owen Kibira (UGA)	0
Omar Elsayed (EGY)	5

Semifinals
Paulo Britos (MOZ)	2
Patrick Ngueumaleu (CMR)	3
Jugurtha Ait (ALG)	WO
Omar Elsayed (EGY)

Final
Patrick Ngueumaleu (CMR)	1
Jugurtha Ait (ALG)	4

=== M71 kg ===
First round
Raúl Abaga (GEQ)	0
Boniface Mogunde (KEN)	5
Mohamed Abdullahi (SOM)	WO
Modather Khalil (SUD)
Mandisile Xayimpi (RSA)	0
Mmusi Tswiige (BOT)	5
Hamza El Barbari (MAR)	5
Albert Mengue (CMR)	0
Mayibongwe Mdluli (SWZ)
Nestor Nduwarugi (BDI)	RSC
Tiago Muxanga (MOZ)	2
Youcef Yaiche (ALG)	3
Isaac Ssenyange (UGA)	0
Merven Clair (MRI)	5
Steve Kulengulika (COD)
Stephen Zimba (ZAM)	WO

Quarterfinals
Boniface Mogunde (KEN)	RSC
Mohamed Abdullahi (SOM)
Mmusi Tswiige (BOT)
Hamza El Barbari (MAR)	RSC
Nestor Nduwarugi (BDI)	0
Youcef Yaiche (ALG)	5
Merven Clair (MRI)	3
Stephen Zimba (ZAM)	2

Semifinals
Boniface Mogunde (KEN)	0
Hamza El Barbari (MAR)	5
Youcef Yaiche (ALG)	1
Merven Clair (MRI)	4

Final
Hamza El Barbari (MAR)	5
Merven Clair (MRI)	0

=== M75 kg ===
Quarterfinals		Semifinals		Final
Yusuf Nkobeza (UGA)	RSC
Joshua Cousin (SEY)		Yusuf Nkobeza (UGA)	2
Driss Gharroumi (MAR)	5	Driss Gharroumi (MAR)	3
Kadafi Nsangou (CMR)	0			Driss Gharroumi (MAR)	0
Younes Nemouchi (ALG)	2			David Tshama (COD)	3
David Tshama (COD)	3	David Tshama (COD)	5
Simnikiwe Bongco (RSA)	5	Simnikiwe Bongco (RSA)	0
Abdul Machele (MOZ)	0

=== M80 kg ===
First round
Octavio Dudevitir (MOZ)	5
Aboubacar Traoré (MLI)	0
Alton Gabuza (RSA)	1
Dasheil Fanchette (SEY)	4

Quarterfinals
Pita Kabeji (COD)	KO
Octavio Dudevitir (MOZ)
Mukiibi Idris (UGA)	0
Abdelrahman Salah (EGY)	5
Ouahab Chikhaoui (ALG)
Junior Fotouo (CMR)	ABD
Dasheil Fanchette (SEY)
Mohamed Assaghir (MAR)	RSC

Semifinals
Pita Kabeji (COD)	4
Abdelrahman Salah (EGY)	0
Junior Fotouo (CMR)	1
Mohamed Assaghir (MAR)	4

Final
Pita Kabeji (COD)	5
Mohamed Assaghir (MAR)	0

=== M86 kg ===
Quarterfinals		Semifinals		Final
		Landry Matete (COD)	0
Arouna Ntosengeh (CMR)	KO	Arouna Ntosengeh (CMR)	3
Tarek Tariket (ALG)				Arouna Ntosengeh (CMR)	0
				Albino Gabriel (MOZ)	5
		Albino Gabriel (MOZ)	RSC
		Bonginkosi Nhlapho (RSA)

=== M92 kg ===
Quarterfinals		Semifinals		Final
		Chapiteau Dimuntu (COD)	3
Miguel Microsse (MOZ)		Ali Elsalamony (EGY)	2
Ali Elsalamony (EGY)	RSC			Chapiteau Dimuntu (COD)	0
				Paul Donatien (CMR)	5
		Paul Donatien (CMR)	3
		Ibrahima Sory (GUI)	2

=== M92+ kg ===
Quarterfinals		Semifinals		Final
		Serge Nvogo (CMR)	0
Jorge Dias (MOZ)		Mourad Kadi (ALG)	5
Mourad Kadi (ALG)	RSC			Mourad Kadi (ALG)	0
Diarga Baldé (SEN)	WO			Yousry Hafez (EGY)	5
Abdulrhman Mansor (SUD)		Diarga Baldé (SEN)
		Yousry Hafez (EGY)	RSC

=== W48 kg ===
Quarterfinals		Semifinals		Final
		Fatiha Mansouri (ALG)	5
Fidelica Cumbe (MOZ)	2	Christine Akoa (CMR)	0
Christine Akoa (CMR)	3			Fatiha Mansouri (ALG)	0
Vuyolwethu Dila (RSA)	0			Margret Tembo (ZAM)	5
Lethabo Modukanele (BOT)	5	Lethabo Modukanele (BOT)	0
Margret Tembo (ZAM)	5	Margret Tembo (ZAM)	5
Christine Ongare (KEN)	0

=== W50 kg ===
Quarterfinals
Teddy Nakimuli (UGA)
Helena Bagâo (MOZ)	RSC
Elizabeth Phiri (ZAM)	3
Eman Mohamed (EGY)	1
Thandolwethu Mathiba (RSA)	0
Roumaysa Boualam (ALG)	5

Semifinals
Rabab Cheddar (MAR)	3
Helena Bagâo (MOZ)	2
Elizabeth Phiri (ZAM)	1
Roumaysa Boualam (ALG)	4

Final
Rabab Cheddar (MAR)	0
Roumaysa Boualam (ALG)	5

=== W52 kg ===
Semifinals		Final
		Reine Ngoune (CMR)	5
Ornella Havyarimana (BDI)	4	Ornella Havyarimana (BDI)	0
Souha Miloudi (ALG)	1

=== W54 kg ===
First round
Yomna Ayyad (EGY)	RSC
Amina Faki (KEN)
Telma Mathule (MOZ)	0
Akezakimana Johari (BDI)	5
Fatma Abdelkader (ALG)	WO
Carine Nkelani (COD)

Quarterfinals
Widad Bertal (MAR)	3
Yomna Ayyad (EGY)	1
Lethokuhle Sibisi (RSA)	0
Sara Haghighat-Joo (SLE)	5
Phekie Bele (BOT)	WO
Akezakimana Johari (BDI)
Fatma Abdelkader (ALG)	4
Hildah Ngandwe (ZAM)	1

Semifinals
Widad Bertal (MAR)	2
Sara Haghighat-Joo (SLE)	3
Phekie Bele (BOT)	1
Fatma Abdelkader (ALG)	4

Final
Sara Haghighat-Joo (SLE)	5
Fatma Abdelkader (ALG)	0

=== W57 kg ===
Quarterfinals		Semifinals		Final
		Phiwokuhle Mnguni (RSA)	1
Marine Camara (MLI)	0	Keamogetse Kenosi (BOT)	4
Keamogetse Kenosi (BOT)	5			Keamogetse Kenosi (BOT)	4
Marcelat Sakobi (COD)	5			Marcelat Sakobi (COD)	1
Benilde Macanringue (MOZ)	0	Marcelat Sakobi (COD)	5
		Juliana Kasonka (ZAM)	0

=== W60 kg ===
Semifinals		Final
		Chaymae Rhaddi (MAR)	1
Hadjila Khelif (ALG)	1	Felistars Nkandu (ZAM)	4
Felistars Nkandu (ZAM)	4

=== W63 kg ===
Semifinals		Final
Naomie Yumba (COD)	0
Imane Khelif (ALG)	5	Imane Khelif (ALG)	RSC
Aratwa Kasemang (BOT)	RSC	Aratwa Kasemang (BOT)
Pamela Mayoli (RSA)

=== W66 kg ===
Final
Ivanusa Gomes (CPV)	1
Ichrak Chaib (ALG)	4

=== W70 kg ===
Quarterfinals
Alcinda Panguana (MOZ)	RSC
Anele Ndlovu (RSA)
Aissatou Keïta (GUI)
Brigitte Mbabi (COD)	RSC
Ariana Memee (SEY)	3
Temnotfo Dlamini (SWZ)	1

Semifinals
Clotilde Essiane (CMR)	0
Alcinda Panguana (MOZ)	4
Brigitte Mbabi (COD)	RSC
Ariana Memee (SEY)

Final
Alcinda Panguana (MOZ)	5
Brigitte Mbabi (COD)	0

=== W75 kg ===
Semifinals		Final
Djouher Benan (ALG)	WO
Jorbelle Malewu (COD)		Djouher Benan (ALG)
Rady Gramane (MOZ)	ABD	Rady Gramane (MOZ)	RSC
Geanne Dicks (RSA)

=== W81+ kg ===
Semifinals		Final
Mkateko Sithole (RSA)
Elizabeth Andiego (KEN)	RSC	Elizabeth Andiego (KEN)
Khadija Mardi (MAR)	RSC	Khadija Mardi (MAR)	RSC
Kanjinga Kambala (COD)
