= Boxing at the 2019 African Games =

- Venue: Al Amal Indoor Sports Center
- Location: Rabat, Morocco
- Dates: 20–29 August

Boxing at the 2019 African Games was held from 20 to 29 August 2019 at the Al Amal Indoor Sports Center in Rabat, Morocco.

== Participating nations ==
- Algeria
- Angola
- Botswana
- Cameroon
- Cape Verde
- Central African Republic
- Chad
- Democratic Republic of the Congo
- Egypt
- Equatorial Guinea
- Ethiopia
- Gabon
- Ghana
- Kenya
- Lesotho
- Libya
- Mali
- Mauritius
- Morocco
- Mozambique
- Namibia
- Niger
- Nigeria
- Senegal
- Seychelles
- Sierra Leone
- Somalia
- Togo
- Tunisia
- Uganda
- Zambia

== Results ==
=== Men's events ===
Event	Gold	Silver	Bronze
Flyweight (52kg)	Mohamed Otukile; Botswana	Hassan Shaffi Bakari; Kenya	Mohamed Flissi; Algeria Dawit Wibshet; Ethiopia
Featherweight (57kg)	Mohamed Hamout; Morocco	Isaac Masembe; Uganda	Everisto Mulenga; Zambia Oussama Mordjane; Algeria
Super lightweight (63kg)	Abdelhaq Nadir; Morocco	Richarno Colin; Mauritius	Jonas Junias Jonas; Namibia Gildas Bangana; Central African Republic
Welterweight (69kg)	Merven Clair; Mauritius	Abdulafeez Osoba; Nigeria	Idriss Kapenga; Democratic Republic of the Congo Boniface Mogunde; Kenya
Middleweight (75kg)	Tarik Allali; Morocco	David Ssemujju; Uganda	George Ouma; Kenya Ahmed Abdelmoneim; Egypt
Light heavyweight (81kg)	Abdelrahman Oraby; Egypt	Peter Mpita Kabeji; Democratic Republic of the Congo	Mohamed Houmri; Algeria Shakul Samed; Ghana
Heavyweight (91kg)	Abdelhafid Benchabla; Algeria	Youness Baalla; Morocco	Youssef Moussa; Egypt Elly Ochola; Kenya
Super heavyweight (+91kg)	Yousry Hafez; Egypt	Jeamie Tshikeva; Democratic Republic of the Congo	Solomon Adebayo; Nigeria Fredrick Ramogi; Kenya

=== Women's events ===
Event	Gold	Silver	Bronze
Flyweight (51kg)	Roumaysa Boualam; Algeria	Yasmine Mouttaki; Morocco	Ayisat Morenikeji Oriyomi; Nigeria
Flyweight (51kg)	Roumaysa Boualam; Algeria	Yasmine Mouttaki; Morocco	Modestine Munga Zalia; Democratic Republic of the Congo
Featherweight (57kg)	Keamogetse Kenosi; Botswana	Marine Camara; Mali	Elizabeth Temitayo Oshoba; Nigeria
Featherweight (57kg)	Keamogetse Kenosi; Botswana	Marine Camara; Mali	Dorine Stéphane Mambou; Cameroon
Lightweight (60kg)	Khouloud Hlimi; Tunisia	Aratwa Kasemang; Botswana	Fadilat Tijani; Nigeria
Lightweight (60kg)	Khouloud Hlimi; Tunisia	Aratwa Kasemang; Botswana	Thérèse Naomie Yumba; Democratic Republic of the Congo
Welterweight (69kg)	Bolanle Shogbamu; Nigeria	Alcinda Panguane; Mozambique	Ivanusa Moreira; Cape Verde
Welterweight (69kg)	Bolanle Shogbamu; Nigeria	Alcinda Panguane; Mozambique	Oumayma Bel Ahbib; Morocco
Middleweight (75kg)	Khadija El-Mardi; Morocco	Rady Gramane; Mozambique	Hellen Baleke; Uganda
Middleweight (75kg)	Khadija El-Mardi; Morocco	Rady Gramane; Mozambique	Toyin Adejumola; Nigeria

== Medal table ==
* Host nation (Morocco)

Rank	Nation	Gold	Silver	Bronze	Total
1	Morocco (MAR)*	4	2	1	7
2	Botswana (BOT)	2	1	0	3
3	Algeria (ALG)	2	0	3	5
4	Egypt (EGY)	2	0	2	4
5	Nigeria (NGR)	1	1	5	7
6	Mauritius (MRI)	1	1	0	2
7	Tunisia (TUN)	1	0	0	1
8	Democratic Republic of the Congo (COD)	0	2	3	5
9	Uganda (UGA)	0	2	1	3
10	Mozambique (MOZ)	0	2	0	2
11	Kenya (KEN)	0	1	4	5
12	Mali (MLI)	0	1	0	1
13	Cameroon (CMR)	0	0	1	1
13	Cape Verde (CPV)	0	0	1	1
13	Central African Republic (CAF)	0	0	1	1
13	Ethiopia (ETH)	0	0	1	1
13	Ghana (GHA)	0	0	1	1
13	Namibia (NAM)	0	0	1	1
13	Zambia (ZAM)	0	0	1	1
Totals (19 entries)		13	13	26	52
