= Shadir Musa Bwogi =

Ugandan boxer (born 1996)

Personal information
- Nationality: Ugandan
- Born: 25 October 1996 (age 29) Naguru, Kampala, Uganda
- Weight: Welterweight

Boxing career
- Stance: Southpaw

Boxing record
- Wins: 10
- Win by KO: 5
- Losses: 1
- Draws: 0

Shadir Musa Bwogi (born 25 October 1996) is a Ugandan boxer and current captain of the Bombers, Uganda's national boxing team. He competes in the welterweight division and is a southpaw. He competed in the men's welterweight event at the 2020 Summer Olympics.

== Background and education ==
Bwogi was born in Naguru to Musa Kimera, a former boxer, and Jamirah Mbabazi Ayikoru.

== Boxing career ==
Bwogi stated that he started boxing in 2009 when he joined the East Coast Boxing Club under his father's guidance, where he trained under Hassan Waswa Kalili and Hussain Kato Kalili. His maiden national team appearance was in 2014 in the light welterweight division, where he represented Uganda in Tanzania's Nyerere Cup.

Bwogi has since represented Uganda at the 2017 African Championships in Congo-Brazzaville where he lost in the preliminaries to Namibia's Jonas Junias. He was part of the Ugandan squad at the 2019 African Games in Rabat, Morocco where he was defeated by Zimbabwe's Silungwe Nkungu.

Locally, he belongs to and represents Kampala City Council Authority (KCCA) Boxing Club and is coached by Vincent Byarugaba, a former national coach. Bwogi is also the winner of the inaugural edition of the Shadow Boxing Challenge organized by the Uganda Boxing Federation (UBF).

=== Commonwealth Games ===
At the 2018 Commonwealth Games held in Gold Coast, Australia, he defeated Merven Clair of Mauritius to qualify for the men's 69 kg quarterfinals and then lost to England's Pat McCormack.

Ahead of the 2022 Commonwealth Games in Birmingham, England, he was a baton bearer for the Queen's Baton Relay, which came to his nation in November 2021.

=== Olympic Games ===
In February 2020, Bwogi qualified for the 2020 Summer Olympics in Tokyo after defeating Ghana's Jesse Lartey in the welterweight box-off on the last day of the 2020 African Boxing Olympic Qualification Tournament that were held in Diamniadio, Senegal. At the Games, he lost 3–1 to Eskerkhan Madiev of Georgia.

== See also ==
- Uganda at the 2020 Summer Olympics
- 2020 African Boxing Olympic Qualification Tournament
- Uganda at the 2018 Commonwealth Games
- Uganda at the 2019 African Games

Olympic Games
Preceded by Joshua Tibatemwa	Flag bearer for Uganda; Tokyo 2020 with Kirabo Namutebi	Succeeded by Charles Kagimu; Gloria Muzito
