= Cameroon at the 2020 Summer Olympics =

- IOC code: CMR
- NOC: Cameroon Olympic and Sports Committee
- Website: www.cnosc.org (in French)

in Tokyo, Japan July 23, 2021 – August 8, 2021
- Competitors: 12 in 7 sports
- Flag bearers (opening): Joseph Essombe; Albert Mengue Ayissi
- Flag bearer (closing): N/A
- Medals: Gold 0 Silver 0 Bronze 0 Total 0

Summer Olympics appearances (overview)
- 1964; 1968; 1972; 1976; 1980; 1984; 1988; 1992; 1996; 2000; 2004; 2008; 2012; 2016; 2020; 2024

Cameroon competed at the 2020 Summer Olympics in Tokyo. Originally scheduled to take place from 24 July to 9 August 2020, the Games were postponed to 23 July to 8 August 2021, because of the COVID-19 pandemic. It was the nation's fifteenth consecutive appearance at the Summer Olympics.

== Competitors ==
The following is the list of number of competitors in the Games.

Sport	Men	Women	Total
Athletics	1	0	1
Boxing	3	0	3
Judo	0	2	2
Swimming	1	1	2
Table tennis	0	1	1
Weightlifting	0	2	2
Wrestling	0	1	1
Total	5	7	12

== Athletics ==
Cameroon received a universality slot from the World Athletics to send a male athlete to the Olympics.

Key

- Note–Ranks given for track events are within the athlete's heat only
- Q = Qualified for the next round
- q = Qualified for the next round as a fastest loser or, in field events, by position without achieving the qualifying target
- NR = National record
- N/A = Round not applicable for the event
- Bye = Athlete not required to compete in round

Track & road events

Athlete	Event	Heat		Semifinal		Final	
Athlete	Event	Result	Rank	Result	Rank	Result	Rank
Emmanuel Eseme	Men's 200 m	20.65	4	Did not advance			

== Boxing ==
Cameroon entered three male boxers into the Olympic tournament. Rio 2016 Olympian Wilfried Ntsengue (men's middleweight), along with rookies Albert Mengue (men's welterweight) and Maxime Yegnong (men's super heavyweight), secured their spots by advancing to the final match of their respective weight divisions at the 2020 African Qualification Tournament in Diamniadio, Senegal.

Athlete	Event	Round of 32	Round of 16	Quarterfinals	Semifinals	Final	
Athlete	Event	Opposition Result	Opposition Result	Opposition Result	Opposition Result	Opposition Result	Rank
Albert Mengue	Men's welterweight	Dlamini (SWZ); W RSC	Walsh (IRL); L 0–5	Did not advance			
Wilfried Ntsengue	Men's middleweight	Tshama (COD); L 2–3	Did not advance				
Maxime Yegnong	Men's super heavyweight	Bye	Veriasov (ROC); L 0–5	Did not advance			

== Judo ==
Cameroon qualified two female judoka for each of the following weight classes at the Games. Rio 2016 Olympian Hortence Atangana was selected among the top 18 judoka of the women's heavyweight (+78 kg) category based on the IJF World Ranking List of June 28, 2021, while 2019 African Games bronze medalist Ayuk Otay Arrey Sophina (women's middleweight, 70 kg) accepted a continental berth from Africa as the nation's top-ranked judoka outside of direct qualifying position.

Athlete	Event	Round of 32	Round of 16	Quarterfinals	Semifinals	Repechage	Final / BM	
Athlete	Event	Opposition Result	Opposition Result	Opposition Result	Opposition Result	Opposition Result	Opposition Result	Rank
Ayuk Otay Arrey Sophina	Women's –70 kg	Kim S-y (KOR); L 00–10	Did not advance					
Hortence Atangana	Women's +78 kg	Sayit (TUR); L 00–01	Did not advance					

== Swimming ==
Cameroon received a universality invitation from FINA to send two top-ranked swimmers (one per gender) in their respective individual events to the Olympics, based on the FINA Points System of June 28, 2021.

Athlete	Event	Heat		Semifinal		Final	
Athlete	Event	Time	Rank	Time	Rank	Time	Rank
Charly Ndjoume	Men's 50 m freestyle	27.22	64	Did not advance			
Norah Elisabeth Milanesi	Women's 50 m freestyle	26.41	44	Did not advance			

== Table tennis ==
Cameroon entered one athlete into the table tennis competition at the Games for the first time in eight years. London 2012 Olympian Sarah Hanffou scored a semifinal victory to occupy one of the four available spots in the women's singles at the 2020 African Olympic Qualification Tournament in Tunis, Tunisia.

Athlete	Event	Preliminary	Round 1	Round 2	Round 3	Round of 16	Quarterfinals	Semifinals	Final / BM	
Athlete	Event	Opposition Result	Opposition Result	Opposition Result	Opposition Result	Opposition Result	Opposition Result	Opposition Result	Opposition Result	Rank
Sarah Hanffou	Women's singles	Trifonova (BUL); L 1–4	Did not advance							

== Weightlifting ==
Cameroon entered two female weightlifters into the Olympic competition. Jeanne Gaëlle Eyenga (women's 76 kg) and Clementine Meukeugni (women's 87 kg) topped the list of weightlifters from Africa in their respective weight categories based on the IWF Absolute Continental Rankings.

Athlete	Event	Snatch		Clean & Jerk		Total	Rank
Athlete	Event	Result	Rank	Result	Rank	Total	Rank
Jeanne Gaëlle Eyenga	Women's –76 kg	91	12	111	11	202	11
Clementine Meukeugni	Women's –87 kg	99	12	125	10	224	11

== Wrestling ==
Cameroon qualified one wrestler for the women's freestyle 53 kg into the Olympic competition, by progressing to the top two finals at the 2021 African & Oceania Qualification Tournament in Hammamet, Tunisia.

Key:

- VT (ranking points: 5–0 or 0–5) – Victory by fall.
- VB (ranking points: 5–0 or 0–5) – Victory by injury (VF for forfeit, VA for withdrawal or disqualification)
- PP (ranking points: 3–1 or 1–3) – Decision by points – the loser with technical points.
- PO (ranking points: 3–0 or 0–3) – Decision by points – the loser without technical points.
- ST (ranking points: 4–0 or 0–4) – Great superiority – the loser without technical points and a margin of victory of at least 8 (Greco-Roman) or 10 (freestyle) points.
- SP (ranking points: 4–1 or 1–4) – Technical superiority – the loser with technical points and a margin of victory of at least 8 (Greco-Roman) or 10 (freestyle) points.

Freestyle

Athlete	Event	Round of 16	Quarterfinal	Semifinal	Repechage	Final / BM	
Athlete	Event	Opposition Result	Opposition Result	Opposition Result	Opposition Result	Opposition Result	Rank
Joseph Essombe	Women's –53 kg	Mukaida (JPN); L 0–4 ^{ST}	Did not advance		Zasina (POL); W 3–1 ^{PP}	Bat-Ochir (MGL); L 1–4 ^{ST}	5
