= Boxing at the 2014 African Youth Games =

2014 African Youth Games in Gaborone was held between 28 and 31 May at the Botswana National Stadium. The competition served as the qualification for the 2014 Summer Youth Olympics which took place in August in Nanjing, China.

== Finals ==
Boxing Final Results – 28 May 2014
Bout	Weight	Medal	Athlete	Country
50	Light Fly (46–49 kg)	Gold	Mohamed Otukile	(Botswana)
50	Light Fly (46–49 kg)	Silver	Feysel Mohamed Zrgaw	(Ethiopia)
50	Light Fly (46–49 kg)	Bronze	Muyideen Ojo Oyokojo	(Nigeria)
50	Light Fly (46–49 kg)	Bronze	Edwin Tshabalala	(South Africa)
51	Fly (52 kg)	Gold	Jughurta Ait Bekka	(Algeria)
51	Fly (52 kg)	Silver	Jose Azarias Balate	(Mozambique)
51	Fly (52 kg)	Bronze	Kutlwano Ogaketse	(Botswana)
51	Fly (52 kg)	Bronze	Zefenyas Shewarega	(Ethiopia)
52	Bantam (56 kg)	Gold	Mekki Ben Said	(Tunisia)
52	Bantam (56 kg)	Silver	David Tshama	RDC
52	Bantam (56 kg)	Bronze	Hasen Seid Elil	(Ethiopia)
52	Bantam (56 kg)	Bronze	Said Baguani	(Kenya)
53	Light (60 kg)	Gold	Azinga Fuzile	(South Africa)
53	Light (60 kg)	Silver	Walid El Kehal	(Morocco)
53	Light (60 kg)	Bronze	Jean Pierre Cyiza	(Rwanda)
53	Light (60 kg)	Bronze	Mulaja Mulaj	RDC
54	Light Welter (64 kg)	Gold	Semchedine Kramou	(Algeria)
54	Light Welter (64 kg)	Silver	Titus Kaluwapa	(Namibia)
54	Light Welter (64 kg)	Bronze	Geremi Guillame Pavillou	(Mauritius)
54	Light Welter (64 kg)	Bronze	Joao Tavares	(Cape Verde)
55	Welter (69 kg)	Gold	Mohamed Hikal	(Egypt)
55	Welter (69 kg)	Silver	Max Ipinye Lauleni	(Namibia)
55	Welter (69 kg)	Bronze	Goderey Mohapeloa	(Lesotho)
55	Welter (69 kg)	Bronze	Laurenzo Lecerf	(Mauritius)
56	Middle (75 kg)	Gold	Mohamed Hadi Mabrouk	(Tunisia)
56	Middle (75 kg)	Silver	John Christopher Albert	(Mauritius)
56	Middle (75 kg)	Bronze	Bill Konah	(Lebanon)
57	Heavy (91 kg)	Gold	Keven Jorcy Kilindo	(Seychelles)
57	Heavy (91 kg)	Silver	Kazeen Isiaka	(Nigeria)
58	Super Heavy (+91 kg)	Gold	Ammar Ourzedine	(Algeria)
58	Super Heavy (+91 kg)	Silver	Reda Ibrahim El Khalifa	(Egypt)
59	Women's Fly (48–51 kg)	Gold	Chahra Bouarour	(Algeria)
59	Women's Fly (48–51 kg)	Silver	Juliana Kassouka	(Zambia)
59	Women's Fly (48–51 kg)	Bronze	Eman Farrag Hussein Mohamed	(Egypt)
59	Women's Fly (48–51 kg)	Bronze	Dipouiso Koketso	(Botswana)
60	Women's Light (57–60 kg)	Gold	Keamogetse Kenosi	(Botswana)
60	Women's Light (57–60 kg)	Silver	Chahira Selmouni	(Algeria)
60	Women's Light (57–60 kg)	Bronze	Linah Kasweka	(Zambia)
60	Women's Light (57–60 kg)	Bronze	Aissatou Keita	(Guinea)
61	Women's Middle (69–75 kg)	Gold	Celina Ezinde Agwu	(Nigeria)
61	Women's Middle (69–75 kg)	Silver	Bassant Mohamed Abderahman	(Egypt)
61	Women's Middle (69–75 kg)	Bronze	Katlego Olatotse	(Botswana)
