= Boxing at the 2020 Summer Olympics – Women's flyweight =

Olympic boxing event

Women's flyweight at the Games of the XXXII Olympiad
- Boxing pictogram
- Venue: Ryōgoku Kokugikan
- Dates: 25 July 2021; 7 August 2021
- Competitors: 26 from 26 nations

Medalists
1st place, gold medalist(s)		Stoyka Krasteva	Bulgaria
2nd place, silver medalist(s)		Buse Naz Çakıroğlu	Turkey
3rd place, bronze medalist(s)		Huang Hsiao-wen	Chinese Taipei
3rd place, bronze medalist(s)		Tsukimi Namiki	Japan

The women's flyweight boxing event at the 2020 Summer Olympics took place between 25 July and 7 August 2021 at the Ryōgoku Kokugikan. 26 boxers from 26 nations competed.

== Background ==
This was the 3rd appearance of the women's flyweight event. The event has been held every Summer Games since the introduction of women's boxing in 2012. It has been at the 48–51 kg range each appearance.

Reigning World Champion Liliya Aetbaeva of Russia had not qualified for the Games, but bantamweight World Champion Huang Hsiao-wen had dropped down to this weight class and qualified for the Games. The 2016 Olympic champion, Nicola Adams of Great Britain, turned professional and did not attempt to qualify.

== Qualification ==
A National Olympic Committee (NOC) could enter only 1 qualified boxer in the weight class. There were 25 quota places available for the women's flyweight, allocated as follows:

- 3 places at the 2020 African Boxing Olympic Qualification Tournament.
- 6 places at the 2020 Asia & Oceania Boxing Olympic Qualification Tournament.
- 6 places at the 2020 European Boxing Olympic Qualification Tournament.
- 4 places that were intended to be awarded at the 2021 Pan American Boxing Olympic Qualification Tournament, which was cancelled. These places were instead awarded through the world ranking list to the top boxers from the Americas who had been registered for the qualification tournament.
- 5 places that were intended to be awarded at a World Olympic Qualifying Tournament, which was cancelled. These places were instead awarded through the world ranking list, with one place for each continental zone (Africa, Asia & Oceania, Europe, Americas). One final place was awarded to the best remaining boxer regardless of continent.
- 1 place for a Tripartite Commission invitation.

The host nation, Japan, was guaranteed a minimum of two places across the five women's boxing events; because Japan qualified boxers in the flyweight and featherweight through the Asia & Oceania tournament, no host places were used in any women's weight class.

== Competition format ==
Like all Olympic boxing events, the competition is a straight single-elimination tournament. The competition begins with a preliminary round, where the number of competitors is reduced to 16, and concludes with a final. As there are fewer than 32 boxers in the competition, a number of boxers will receive a bye through the preliminary round. Both semifinal losers are awarded bronze medals.

Bouts consist of three three-minute rounds with a one-minute break between rounds. A boxer may win by knockout or by points. Scoring is on the "10-point-must" system, with 5 judges scoring each round. Judges consider "number of blows landed on the target areas, domination of the bout, technique and tactical superiority and competitiveness." Each judge determines a winner for each round, who receives 10 points for the round, and assigns the round's loser a number of points between 7 and 9 based on performance. The judge's scores for each round are added to give a total score for that judge. The boxer with the higher score from a majority of the judges is the winner.

== Schedule ==
The flyweight starts with the round of 32 on 25 July. There are three rest days before the round of 16 on 28 July, two more before the quarterfinals on 1 August, two more before the semifinals on 4 August, and two more before the final on 7 August.

Legend

R32	Round of 32	R16	Round of 16	QF	Quarterfinals	SF	Semifinals	F	Final

Date	Jul 24		Jul 25		Jul 26		Jul 27		Jul 28		Jul 29		Jul 30		Jul 31		Aug 1		Aug 2		Aug 3		Aug 4		Aug 5		Aug 6		Aug 7		Aug 8	
Event	A	E	A	E	A	E	A	E	A	E	A	E	A	E	A	E	A	E	A	E	A	E	A	E	A	E	A	E	A	E	A	E
Women's flyweight			R32								R16						QF						SF						F			

== Results ==
=== Finals ===
Final
Buse Naz Çakıroğlu (TUR)	0
Stoyka Krasteva (BUL)	5

=== Top half ===
First round
Sandra Drabik (POL)	1
Tursunoy Rakhimova (UZB)	4
Irish Magno (PHI)	5
Christine Ongare (KEN)	0
Roumaysa Boualam (ALG)	0
Jutamas Jitpong (THA)	5
Mandy Bujold (CAN)	0
Nina Radovanović (SRB)	5
Giordana Sorrentino (ITA)	5
Irismar Cardozo (VEN)	0

Second round
Buse Naz Çakıroğlu (TUR)	3
Tursunoy Rakhimova (UZB)	2
Irish Magno (PHI)	0
Jutamas Jitpong (THA)	5
Ornella Havyarimana (BDI)	0
Nina Radovanović (SRB)	5
Giordana Sorrentino (ITA)	0
Huang Hsiao-wen (TPE)	5

Quarterfinals
Buse Naz Çakıroğlu (TUR)	5
Jutamas Jitpong (THA)	0
Nina Radovanović (SRB)	0
Huang Hsiao-wen (TPE)	5

Semifinals
Buse Naz Çakıroğlu (TUR)	5
Huang Hsiao-wen (TPE)	0

=== Bottom half ===
First round
Mary Kom (IND)	4
Miguelina Hernández (DOM)	1
Tsukimi Namiki (JPN)	5
Catherine Nanziri (UGA)	0
Svetlana Soluianova (ROC)	2
Virginia Fuchs (USA)	3
Stoyka Krasteva (BUL)	3
Nguyễn Thị Tâm (VIE)	2
Rabab Cheddar (MAR)	0
Charley Davison (GBR)	5

Second round
Ingrit Valencia (COL)	3
Mary Kom (IND)	2
Tsukimi Namiki (JPN)	5
Graziele Jesus (BRA)	0
Virginia Fuchs (USA)	0
Stoyka Krasteva (BUL)	5
Charley Davison (GBR)	0
Chang Yuan (CHN)	5

Quarterfinals
Ingrit Valencia (COL)	0
Tsukimi Namiki (JPN)	5
Stoyka Krasteva (BUL)	4
Chang Yuan (CHN)	1

Semifinals
Tsukimi Namiki (JPN)	0
Stoyka Krasteva (BUL)	5
