= Elizabeth Oshoba =

Nigerian boxer (born 1999)

Personal information
- Nationality: Nigerian
- Born: Elizabeth Temitayo Oshoba; 23 December 1999 (age 26) Lagos State, Nigeria

Boxing career
- Stance: Orthodox

Boxing record
- Total fights: 10
- Wins: 10
- Win by KO: 6
- Losses: 0
Medal record
Women's amateur boxing
Representing Nigeria
Commonwealth Games
Silver medal – second place	2022 Birmingham	Featherweight (-57 kg)
African Games
Bronze medal – third place	2019 Rabat	Featherweight (-57 kg)

Elizabeth Temitayo Oshoba (born 23 December 1999) is a Nigerian professional boxer. She competes in the featherweight and super-featherweight divisions and has held the International Boxing Organization (IBO) female super-featherweight title and the World Boxing Council (WBC) Silver Featherweight title.

She participated in the 2022 Commonwealth Games in the Featherweight division and won a silver medal.

As of 2026, Oshoba has a professional record of 10 wins and no losses, with six victories coming by knockout.

== Early life ==
Elizabeth Temitayo Oshoba was born on 23 December 1999 in Agbado, Lagos State, Nigeria. She is one of four children and has two sisters and a brother. Oshoba attended nursery and primary school in Lagos before relocating with her family to Ogun State, where she completed her secondary education at Ilogbo-Asowo Community High School in Ilogbo-Ota.

Oshoba developed an interest in boxing while still in school. She faced criticism at an early stage and was bullied for choosing boxing.

"The guys in school did not want to accept that a lady could be doing this"

— Elizabeth Temitayo Oshoba,

But she continued training and competing, gradually establishing herself in amateur boxing.

== Career ==
=== Amateur career ===
Oshoba began her amateur boxing career in Nigeria, where she competed in domestic competitions and won multiple national titles. She was a regular participant in national championships and became a six-time Nigerian amateur champion.

In 2019, she represented Nigeria at the African Games held in Rabat, Morocco, where she won a bronze medal in the women’s Featherweight division and lost to Keamogetse Kenosi in the semifinals. The result marked her first appearance for the national team at a major continental event.

She continued to compete in domestic competitions, winning a gold medal at the 2021 National Sports Festival in Edo State. She was also named Best Female Boxer at the National Boxing Championships.

She later relocated to the UK to launch her professional career in 2022. Where she tested positive for COVID-19 in the lead-up to the Commonwealth Games, which affected her preparations for the tournament. In August 2022, Oshoba competed for Nigeria in amateur boxing at the Commonwealth Games, where she became the first Nigerian boxer to reach a major international tournament final since Adura Olalehin in 2006. She won a silver medal in the women’s Featherweight division at the 2022 Commonwealth Games at the National Exhibition Centre Hall 4 in Birmingham.

=== Professional career ===
In November 2023, she won the IBO female super-featherweight title after defeating Martina Righi by decision. In January 2024, she defeated Michela Braga to win the WBC Silver featherweight title.

On 5 April 2026, Oshoba faced Chelsey Arnell at Olympia in London. She won the fight by technical knockout in the third round, with the referee stopping the contest after a series of unanswered punches.
