= List of flag bearers for Cameroon at the Olympics =

Cameroon at the Olympics
- IOC code: CMR
- NOC: Cameroon Olympic and Sports Committee
- Website: www.cnosc.com (in French)
- Medals: Gold 3 Silver 1 Bronze 2 Total 6

Summer appearances
- 1964; 1968; 1972; 1976; 1980; 1984; 1988; 1992; 1996; 2000; 2004; 2008; 2012; 2016; 2020; 2024

Winter appearances
- 2002; 2006–2026

This is a list of flag bearers who have represented Cameroon at the Olympics.

Flag bearers carry the national flag of their country at the opening ceremony of the Olympic Games.

#	Event year	Season	Flag bearer	Sport
1	1964	Summer		
2	1968	Summer		
3	1972	Summer	Gaston Malam	Athletics
4	1976	Summer		
5	1980	Summer		
6	1984	Summer	Issa Hayatou	Official
7	1988	Summer	Frédéric Ebong-Salle	Athletics
8	1992	Summer		
9	1996	Summer	Georgette N'Koma	Athletics
10	2000	Summer	Cécile Ngambi	Athletics (did not compete)
11	2002	Winter	Isaac Menyoli	Cross-country skiing
12	2004	Summer	Vencelas Dabaya	Weightlifting
13	2008	Summer	Franck Moussima	Judo
14	2012	Summer	Annabelle Ali	Wrestling
15	2016	Summer	Wilfried Seyi	Boxing
16	2020	Summer	Joseph Essombe	Wrestling
16	2020	Summer	Albert Mengue	Boxing
17	2024	Summer	Emmanuel Eseme	Athletics
17	2024	Summer	Richelle Anita Soppi Mbella	Judo

== See also ==
- Cameroon at the Olympics
