= Boxing at the 2020 Summer Olympics – Men's heavyweight =

Olympic boxing event

Men's heavyweight at the Games of the XXXII Olympiad
- Boxing pictogram
- Venue: Ryōgoku Kokugikan
- Dates: 24 July 2021; 6 August 2021
- Competitors: 17 from 17 nations
- Winning time: 5:0

Medalists
1st place, gold medalist(s)		Julio César La Cruz; Cuba
2nd place, silver medalist(s)		Muslim Gadzhimagomedov; ROC
3rd place, bronze medalist(s)		David Nyika; New Zealand
3rd place, bronze medalist(s)		Abner Teixeira; Brazil

The men's heavyweight boxing event at the 2020 Summer Olympics is scheduled to take place between 24 July and 6 August 2021 at the Ryōgoku Kokugikan. 17 boxers from 17 nations are expected to compete.

The medals for the competition were presented by His Royal Highness Prince Faisal bin Hussein, IOC Executive Board Member, Jordan, and the medalists' bouquets were presented by William Frederick Blick, BTF Member; Uganda.

== Background ==
This will be the 26th appearance of the men's heavyweight event. The event has been held at every Olympic boxing tournament (boxing was not held in 1896, 1900, and 1912). Heavyweight was the unlimited weight class from 1904 to 1980, but since 1984 has been limited to 81–91 kg (which remains unchanged in 2020) with the introduction of the super heavyweight class.

Reigning World Champion Muslim Gadzhimagomedov of Russia has qualified for the Games. The 2016 Olympic champion, Evgeny Tishchenko also of Russia, turned professional and did not attempt to qualify. The 2016 light heavyweight gold medalist, Julio César La Cruz of Cuba, has moved up to the heavyweight class for the 2020 Games.

== Qualification ==
A National Olympic Committee (NOC) could enter only 1 qualified boxer in the weight class. There were 17 quota places available for the men's heavyweight, allocated as follows:

- 2 places at the 2020 African Boxing Olympic Qualification Tournament.
- 3 places at the 2020 Asia & Oceania Boxing Olympic Qualification Tournament.
- 4 places at the 2020 European Boxing Olympic Qualification Tournament.
- 4 places that were intended to be awarded at the 2021 Pan American Boxing Olympic Qualification Tournament, which was cancelled. These places were instead awarded through the world ranking list to the top boxers from the Americas who had been registered for the qualification tournament.
- 4 places that were intended to be awarded at a World Olympic Qualifying Tournament, which was cancelled. These places were instead awarded through the world ranking list, with one place for each continental zone (Africa, Asia & Oceania, Europe, Americas).

No host places or Tripartite Commission invitation places were reserved for the men's heavyweight.

== Competition format ==
Like all Olympic boxing events, the competition is a straight single-elimination tournament. The competition begins with a preliminary round, where the number of competitors is reduced to 16, and concludes with a final. As there are fewer than 32 boxers in the competition, a number of boxers will receive a bye through the preliminary round. Both semifinal losers are awarded bronze medals.

Bouts consist of three three-minute rounds with a one-minute break between rounds. A boxer may win by knockout or by points. Scoring is on the "10-point-must" system, with 5 judges scoring each round. Judges consider "number of blows landed on the target areas, domination of the bout, technique and tactical superiority and competitiveness." Each judge determines a winner for each round, who receives 10 points for the round, and assigns the round's loser a number of points between 7 and 9 based on performance. The judge's scores for each round are added to give a total score for that judge. The boxer with the higher score from a majority of the judges is the winner.

== Schedule ==
The heavyweight starts with the round of 32 on 24 July. There are two rest days before the round of 16 on 27 July, two more before the quarterfinals on 30 July, three more before the semifinals on 3 August, and two more before the final on 6 August.

Legend

R32	Round of 32	R16	Round of 16	QF	Quarterfinals	SF	Semifinals	F	Final

Date	Jul 24		Jul 25		Jul 26		Jul 27		Jul 28		Jul 29		Jul 30		Jul 31		Aug 1		Aug 2		Aug 3		Aug 4		Aug 5		Aug 6		Aug 7		Aug 8	
Event	A	E	A	E	A	E	A	E	A	E	A	E	A	E	A	E	A	E	A	E	A	E	A	E	A	E	A	E	A	E	A	E
Men's heavyweight	R32						R16						QF								SF						F					

== Results ==
=== Finals ===
Final
Muslim Gadzhimagomedov (ROC)	0
Julio César La Cruz (CUB)	5

=== Top half ===
Round of 32
Sanjar Tursunov (UZB)	1
Abdelhafid Benchabla (ALG)	4

Round of 16
Muslim Gadzhimagomedov (ROC)	5
Abdelhafid Benchabla (ALG)	0
Ammar Abduljabbar (GER)	5
José María Lúcar (PER)	0
Ato Plodzicki-Faoagali (SAM)	1
Uladzislau Smiahlikau (BLR)	4
Youness Baalla (MAR)	0
David Nyika (NZL)	5

Quarterfinals
Muslim Gadzhimagomedov (ROC)	5
Ammar Abduljabbar (GER)	0
Uladzislau Smiahlikau (BLR)	0
David Nyika (NZL)	5

Semifinals
Muslim Gadzhimagomedov (ROC)	4
David Nyika (NZL)	1

=== Bottom half ===
Round of 16
Julio Castillo (ECU)	0
Hussein Ishaish (JOR)	4
Abner Teixeira (BRA)	4
Cheavon Clarke (GBR)	1
Elly Ochola (KEN)	0
Julio César La Cruz (CUB)	5
Enmanuel Reyes (ESP)	KO
Vassiliy Levit (KAZ)

Quarterfinals
Hussein Ishaish (JOR)	1
Abner Teixeira (BRA)	4
Julio César La Cruz (CUB)	4
Emmanuel Reyes (ESP)	1

Semifinals
Abner Teixeira (BRA)	1
Julio César La Cruz (CUB)	4
