= Boxing at the 2018 Commonwealth Games – Men's welterweight =

Boxing competitions

Boxing – Men's welterweight at the 2018 Commonwealth Games
- Venue: Oxenford Studios
- Dates: 5 – 14 April 2018
- Competitors: 23 from 23 nations

Medalists
gold medal	Pat McCormack	England
silver medal	Aidan Walsh	Northern Ireland
bronze medal	Winston Hill	Fiji
bronze medal	Manoj Kumar	India

The men's welterweight boxing competitions at the 2018 Commonwealth Games in Gold Coast, Australia took place between 5 and 14 April at Oxenford Studios. Welterweights were limited to those boxers weighing less than 69 kilograms.

Like all Commonwealth boxing events, the competition was a straight single-elimination tournament. Both semifinal losers were awarded bronze medals, so no boxers competed again after their first loss. Bouts consisted of three rounds of three minutes each, with one-minute breaks between rounds. Beginning this year, the competition was scored using the "must-ten" scoring system.

== Schedule ==
The schedule is as follows:

All times are Australian Eastern Standard Time (UTC+10)

Date	Time	Round
Thursday 5 April 2018	12:02 & 18:32	Round of 32
Saturday 7 April 2018	12:02 & 18:32	Round of 16
Tuesday 10 April 2018	18:32	Quarter-finals
Friday 13 April 2018	18:32	Semi-finals
Saturday 14 April 2018	18:47	Final

== Results ==
The draw is as follows:

Round of 32
Stephen Newns (SCO)	4
John Moleni (TGA)	1
Billy Le Poullain (GUE)	2
Gul Zaib (PAK)	3
Leroy Hindley (NZL)	5
Abu Bakarr Katta (SLE)	0
Terry Nickolas (AUS)	5
Carl Hield (BAH)	0
Osita Umeh (NGR)	0
Manoj Kumar (IND)	5
Jonathan Francois (GRN)	5
Shain Boniface (SEY)	0
Merven Clair (MRI)	5
Abubakari Quartey (GHA)	0

Round of 16
Curlun Richardson (AIA)	0
Stephen Newns (SCO)	5
Winston Hill (FIJ)	3
Lyndel Marcellin (LCA)	2
Aidan Walsh (NIR)	5
Gul Zaib (PAK)	0
Leroy Hindley (NZL)	4
Mokhachane Moshoeshoe (LES)	1
Thabiso Dlamini (SWZ)	0
Terry Nickolas (AUS)	5
Manoj Kumar (IND)	5
Kassim Mbundwike (TAN)	0
Pat McCormack (ENG)	KO
Jonathan Francois (GRN)
Merven Clair (MRI)	2
Musa Bwogi (UGA)	3

Quarterfinals
Stephen Newns (SCO)	0
Winston Hill (FIJ)	5
Aidan Walsh (NIR)	5
Leroy Hindley (NZL)	0
Terry Nickolas (AUS)	1
Manoj Kumar (IND)	4
Pat McCormack (ENG)	5
Musa Bwogi (UGA)	0

Semifinals
Winston Hill (FIJ)	0
Aidan Walsh (NIR)	5
Manoj Kumar (IND)	0
Pat McCormack (ENG)	5

Final
Aidan Walsh (NIR)	0
Pat McCormack (ENG)	5
