= Widad Bertal =

Moroccan boxer (born 1999)

Personal information
- Born: 31 August 1999 (age 27)

Sport
- Country: Morocco
- Sport: Boxing
- Weight class: 54 kg
Medal record
Women's boxing
Representing Morocco
World Championships
Gold medal – first place	2025 Niš	Bantamweight
African Games
Gold medal – first place	2023 Accra	54 kg
Mediterranean Games
Silver medal – second place	2026 Taranto	Bantamweight
Arab Games
Gold medal – first place	2023 Algiers	54 kg
African Championships
Gold medal – first place	2023 Yaoundé	54 kg
Gold medal – first place	2024 Kinshasa	54 kg
Bronze medal – third place	2022 Maputo	54 kg

Widad Bertal (born 31 August 1999) is a Moroccan boxer competing in the bantamweight (54 kg) division. She won the gold medal in the women's 54 kg event at the 2023 African Games held in Accra, Ghana. She also won the gold medal in her event at the 2025 World Championships held in Niš, Serbia.

== Career ==
In 2020, Bertal competed at the African Boxing Olympic Qualification Tournament held in Diamniadio, Senegal hoping to qualify for the 2020 Summer Olympics in Tokyo, Japan. She was eliminated by Keamogetse Kenosi of Botswana and she did not qualify for the Olympics. A few months later, she competed in the featherweight event at the 2022 IBA Women's World Boxing Championships held in Istanbul, Turkey. She was eliminated by Esra Özyol of Turkey in her first match.

Bertal represented Morocco at the 2022 Mediterranean Games held in Oran, Algeria. She competed in the women's bantamweight event where she was eliminated in her second match. In that same year, she won one of the bronze medals at the 2022 African Amateur Boxing Championships held in Maputo, Mozambique.

In 2023, Bertal competed in the bantamweight event at the IBA Women's World Boxing Championships held in New Delhi, India. In August 2023, she won the gold medal in her event at the African Amateur Boxing Championships held in Yaoundé, Cameroon. In September 2023, Bertal competed at the African Boxing Olympic Qualification Tournament held in Dakar, Senegal and she qualified for the 2024 Summer Olympics in Paris, France.
