= Boxing at the 2022 Commonwealth Games – Women's minimumweight =

Boxing competitions

Boxing – Women's minimumweight at the 2022 Commonwealth Games
- Venue: National Exhibition Centre Hall 4
- Dates: 3–7 August 2022
- Competitors: 8 from 8 nations

Medalists
gold medal	Nitu Ghanghas	India
silver medal	Demie-Jade Resztan	England
bronze medal	Priyanka Dhillon	Canada
bronze medal	Lethabo Modukanele	Botswana

The women's minimumweight boxing competitions at the 2022 Commonwealth Games in Birmingham, England took place between July 29 and August 7 at National Exhibition Centre Hall 4. Minimumweights were limited to those boxers weighing between 45 kg but less than 48 kilograms.

Like all Commonwealth boxing events, the competition was a straight single-elimination tournament. Both semifinal losers were awarded bronze medals, so no boxers competed again after their first loss. Bouts consisted of three rounds of three minutes each, with one-minute breaks between rounds.

== Schedule ==
The schedule is as follows:

Date	Round
Wednesday 3 August	Quarter-finals
Saturday 6 August	Semi-finals
Sunday 7 August 2022	Final

== Results ==
The draw is as follows:

=== Bracket ===
Quarterfinals
Christine Ongare (KEN)	1
Priyanka Dhillon (CAN)	4
Nitu Ghanghas (IND)	ABD
Nicole Clyde (NIR)
Lethabo Modukanele (BOT)	4
Nadeeka Pushpakumari (SRI)	0
Margret Tembo (ZAM)	0
Demie-Jade Resztan (ENG)	5

Semifinals
Priyanka Dhillon (CAN)
Nitu Ghanghas (IND)	RSC
Lethabo Modukanele (BOT)	0
Demie-Jade Resztan (ENG)	5

Finals
Nitu Ghanghas (IND)	5
Demie-Jade Resztan (ENG)	0
