= Boxing at the 2022 Mediterranean Games – Men's light heavyweight =

Boxing competitions

Men's light heavyweight boxing at the 2022 Mediterranean Games
- Venue: EMEC Hall
- Date: 27 June – 1 July
- Competitors: 12 from 12 nations

Medalists
gold medal	Vladimir Mironchikov	Serbia
silver medal	Mohammed Houmri	Algeria
bronze medal	Petar Marčić	Montenegro
bronze medal	Gazimagomed Jalidov	Spain

The men's light heavyweight (81 kg) competition of the boxing events at the 2022 Mediterranean Games in Oran, Algeria, was held from 27 June to 1 July at the EMEC Hall.

Like all Mediterranean Games boxing events, the competition was a straight single-elimination tournament. Both semifinal losers were awarded bronze medals, so no boxers competed again after their first loss.

== Results ==
Round of 16
Mohamed Assaghir (MAR)	3
Cheikhmar Koné (FRA)	0
Damir Plantić (CRO)	0
Abdelrahman Oraby (EGY)	3
Abd Al Hameed Youssef (SYR)
Kaan Aykutsun (TUR)	RSC-I
Alfred Commey (ITA)	1
Gazimagomed Jalidov (ESP)	2

Quarterfinals
Mohammed Houmri (ALG)	3
Mohamed Assaghir (MAR)	0
Abdelrahman Oraby (EGY)	0
Petar Marčić (MNE)	3
Vladimir Mironchikov (SRB)	3
Kaan Aykutsun (TUR)	0
Gazimagomed Jalidov (ESP)	RSC
Ahmed Đananović (BIH)

Semifinals
Mohammed Houmri (ALG)	3
Petar Marčić (MNE)	0
Vladimir Mironchikov (SRB)	3
Gazimagomed Jalidov (ESP)	0

Final
Mohammed Houmri (ALG)	1
Vladimir Mironchikov (SRB)	2
