= Boxing at the 2020 Summer Olympics – Men's welterweight =

Olympic boxing competition

Men's welterweight at the Games of the XXXII Olympiad
- Boxing pictogram
- Venue: Ryōgoku Kokugikan
- Dates: 24 July 2021; 3 August 2021
- Competitors: 23 from 23 nations

Medalists
1st place, gold medalist(s)		Roniel Iglesias	Cuba
2nd place, silver medalist(s)		Pat McCormack	Great Britain
3rd place, bronze medalist(s)		Aidan Walsh	Ireland
3rd place, bronze medalist(s)		Andrey Zamkovoy	ROC

The men's welterweight boxing event at the 2020 Summer Olympics took place between 24 July and 3 August 2021 at the Ryōgoku Kokugikan. 23 boxers from 23 nations are expected to compete.

== Background ==
This will be the 25th appearance of the men's welterweight event. The event appeared at the first Olympic boxing tournament in 1904, was not held in 1908, and has been held at every Games with boxing (that is, excluding 1912) since, beginning with 1920. The maximum weight for the welterweight class has been 69 kg since 2004 and remains there for 2020; the removal of the light-welterweight class moves the lower bound of welterweight from 64 kg to 63 kg.

Three-time Olympian, 2012 bronze medalist and reigning World Champion Andrey Zamkovoy of Russia has qualified for the Games. The 2016 Olympic champion, Daniyar Yeleussinov of Kazakhstan, turned professional and did not attempt to qualify.

== Qualification ==
A National Olympic Committee (NOC) could enter only 1 qualified boxer in the weight class. There were 23 quota places available for the men's welterweight, allocated as follows:

- 3 places at the 2020 African Boxing Olympic Qualification Tournament.
- 5 places at the 2020 Asia & Oceania Boxing Olympic Qualification Tournament.
- 6 places at the 2020 European Boxing Olympic Qualification Tournament.
- 4 places that were intended to be awarded at the 2021 Pan American Boxing Olympic Qualification Tournament, which was cancelled. These places were instead awarded through the world ranking list to the top boxers from the Americas who had been registered for the qualification tournament.
- 4 places that were intended to be awarded at a World Olympic Qualifying Tournament, which was cancelled. These places were instead awarded through the world ranking list, with one place for each continental zone (Africa, Asia & Oceania, Europe, Americas).
- 1 place for a Tripartite Commission invitation.

No places were reserved for the host nation in the men's welterweight class.

== Competition format ==
Like all Olympic boxing events, the competition is a straight single-elimination tournament. The competition begins with a preliminary round, where the number of competitors is reduced to 16, and concludes with a final. As there are fewer than 32 boxers in the competition, a number of boxers will receive a bye through the preliminary round. Both semifinal losers are awarded bronze medals.

Bouts consist of three three-minute rounds with a one-minute break between rounds. A boxer may win by knockout or by points. Scoring is on the "10-point-must" system, with 5 judges scoring each round. Judges consider "number of blows landed on the target areas, domination of the bout, technique and tactical superiority and competitiveness." Each judge determines a winner for each round, who receives 10 points for the round, and assigns the round's loser a number of points between 7 and 9 based on performance. The judge's scores for each round are added to give a total score for that judge. The boxer with the higher score from a majority of the judges is the winner.

== Schedule ==
The welterweight starts with the round of 32 on 24 July. There are two rest days before the round of 16 on 27 July, then two more rest days before the quarterfinals on 30 July. After that, there is only one rest day between rounds, with the semifinals on 1 August and the final on 3 August.

Legend

R32	Round of 32	R16	Round of 16	QF	Quarterfinals	SF	Semifinals	F	Final

Date	Jul 24		Jul 25		Jul 26		Jul 27		Jul 28		Jul 29		Jul 30		Jul 31		Aug 1		Aug 2		Aug 3		Aug 4		Aug 5		Aug 6		Aug 7		Aug 8	
Event	A	E	A	E	A	E	A	E	A	E	A	E	A	E	A	E	A	E	A	E	A	E	A	E	A	E	A	E	A	E	A	E
Men's welterweight	R32						R16						QF				SF					F										

== Results ==
=== Finals ===
Final
Pat McCormack (GBR)	0
Roniel Iglesias (CUB)	5

=== Top half ===
First round
Necat Ekinci (TUR)	2
Aliaksandr Radzionau (BLR)	3
Albert Mengue (CMR)	RSC
Thabiso Dlamini (SWZ)
Merven Clair (MRI)	5
Wyatt Sanford (CAN)	0

Second round
Pat McCormack (GBR)	5
Aliaksandr Radzionau (BLR)	0
Rohan Polanco (DOM)	0
Bobo-Usmon Baturov (UZB)	4
Aidan Walsh (IRL)	5
Albert Mengue (CMR)	0
Merven Clair (MRI)	3
Zeyad Ishaish (JOR)	2

Quarterfinals
Pat McCormack (GBR)	4
Bobo-Usmon Baturov (UZB)	1
Aidan Walsh (IRL)	4
Merven Clair (MRI)	1

Semifinals
Pat McCormack (GBR)	WO
Aidan Walsh (IRL)

=== Bottom half ===
First round
Sewon Okazawa (JPN)	5
Vikas Krishan Yadav (IND)	0
Delante Johnson (USA)	3
Brian Arregui (ARG)	2
Lorenzo Sotomayor (AZE)
Eskerkhan Madiev (GEO)	RSC-I
Marion Faustino Ah Tong (SAM)	0
Stephen Zimba (ZAM)	5

Second round
Roniel Iglesias (CUB)	3
Sewon Okazawa (JPN)	2
Delante Johnson (USA)	4
Ablaikhan Zhussupov (KAZ)	1
Shadiri Bwogi (UGA)	1
Eskerkhan Madiev (GEO)	3
Stephen Zimba (ZAM)	1
Andrey Zamkovoy (ROC)	4

Quarterfinals
Roniel Iglesias (CUB)	5
Delante Johnson (USA)	0
Eskerkhan Madiev (GEO)	0
Andrey Zamkovoy (ROC)	5

Semifinals
Roniel Iglesias (CUB)	5
Andrey Zamkovoy (ROC)	0
