= Boxing at the 2022 Commonwealth Games – Women's featherweight =

Boxing competitions

Boxing – Women's featherweight at the 2022 Commonwealth Games
- Venue: National Exhibition Centre Hall 4
- Dates: 2–7 August 2022
- Competitors: 12 from 12 nations

Medalists
gold medal	Michaela Walsh	Northern Ireland
silver medal	Elizabeth Oshoba	Nigeria
bronze medal	Phiwokuhle Mnguni	South Africa
bronze medal	Tina Rahimi	Australia

The Women's featherweight boxing competitions at the 2022 Commonwealth Games in Birmingham, England took place between August 2 and 7th at National Exhibition Centre Hall 4. featherweights were limited to those boxers weighing between 54 and 57 kilograms.

Like all Commonwealth boxing events, the competition was a straight single-elimination tournament. Both semifinal losers were awarded bronze medals, so no boxers competed again after their first loss. Bouts consisted of three rounds of three minutes each, with one-minute breaks between rounds.

== Schedule ==
The schedule is as follows:

Date	Round
Tuesday 2 August	Preliminaries
Thursday 4 August	Quarter-finals
Saturday 6 August	Semi-finals
Sunday 7 August 2022	Final

== Results ==
The draw is as follows:

=== Bracket ===
Preliminaries
Mehreen (PAK)	0
Sajeewani Coorey (SRI)	5
Keamogetse Kenosi (BOT)	5
Natasha Maya (MAW)	0
Elizabeth Oshoba (NGR)	5
Erin Walsh (NZL)	0
Sameenah Toussaint (ENG)	4
Zoe Andrews (WAL)	1

Quarterfinals
Phiwokuhle Mnguni (RSA)	RSC
Sajeewani Coorey (SRI)
Keamogetse Kenosi (BOT)	0
Michaela Walsh (NIR)	5
Tianna Guy (TTO)	2
Elizabeth Oshoba (NGR)	3
Sameenah Toussaint (ENG)	0
Tina Rahimi (AUS)	5

Semifinals
Phiwokuhle Mnguni (RSA)	0
Michaela Walsh (NIR)	5
Elizabeth Oshoba (NGR)	4
Tina Rahimi (AUS)	1

Final
Michaela Walsh (NIR)	5
Elizabeth Oshoba (NGR)	0
