= Ornella Sathoud =

Ghanaian boxer (born 1987)

Ornella Sathoud (born 12 October 1987) is a Ghanaian amateur boxer. She is competing in the women's middleweight division in the 2022 Commonwealth Games.

== Early life and education ==
Sathoud was born to a Congolese father and Ghanaian mother. She holds a Doctor of Philosophy degree in Analytical Chemistry from the University of Delaware where she completed in 2018. Her thesis was titled ''Fabrication of a surface plasmon resonance platform for the development of an electrokintic surface plasmon resonance (EK-SPR) biosensor''.

== Boxing career ==
Sathoud represented Ghana at the 2019 African Games in Morocco. She was eliminated by eventual gold medallist Khadija El-Mardi in the round of 16 of the women's middleweight division.

In February 2020, Sathoud represented Ghana at the 2020 African Boxing Olympic Qualification Tournament in Dakar, Senegal in her quest to qualify for the 2020 Summer Olympics in Tokyo. In her first bout at the tournament, she defeated Doreen Nissali of Uganda after overpowering her opponent and forcing the referee to step in and stop the fight to hand her the victory. She won bronze in the women's middleweight division during after she lost 5–0 to Gramane Rady Adosinda of Mozambique in the semi-finals. The loss prevented her from earning an automatic qualification for the 2020 Summer Olympics. The bronze medal made her the first female Ghanaian boxer at an international tournament.

Sathoud became the first female boxer to represent Ghana at the Commonwealth Games during the 2022 Commonwealth Games in Birmingham, United Kingdom, when she fought against British boxer Kerry Davis Round of 16 bout of the women's middleweight division. She lost to the British boxer with the judges ruling 4–0 at the end of the three rounds. At the time of games she was ranked 10th in the World and 3rd in Africa.
