= Hellen Baleke =

Ugandan boxer (born 1987)

Personal information
- Nickname: Nnalongo
- Nationality: Ugandan
- Born: Hellen Baleke; May 3, 1987 (age 39) Kayunga District, Uganda
- Weight: Middleweight

Boxing career
Medal record
Women's boxing
Representing Uganda
African Games
Bronze medal – third place	2019 Rabat	Middleweight

Hellen Baleke (born 3 May 1987) is a Ugandan amateur boxer notable for being the first Ugandan woman to win a bronze medal in boxing at the 2019 All Africa Games.

== Boxing career ==
Hellen Baleke took up boxing in 2005 as a trainee with Rhino Club before moving to KCCA Boxing Club in 2008. She competes in the middleweight division. She has also represented Uganda internationally with the She Bombers and is coached by Mercy Mukankusi.

She has represented Uganda at the 2014 AIBA Women's World Boxing Championships in Jeju, South Korea, where she lost to eventual Gold medal winner, Claressa Shields. She also participated in the 2019 African Games, where she fought Khadija El-Mardi en route to winning the bronze medal.

== Personal life ==
Hellen Baleke was born to Sarah Bagoole in Kayunga District.

Hellen Baleke is a mother of two and is the elder sister of She Bombers boxer, Diana Tulyanabo.
