= Emily Nakalema =

Ugandan female boxer (born 1994)

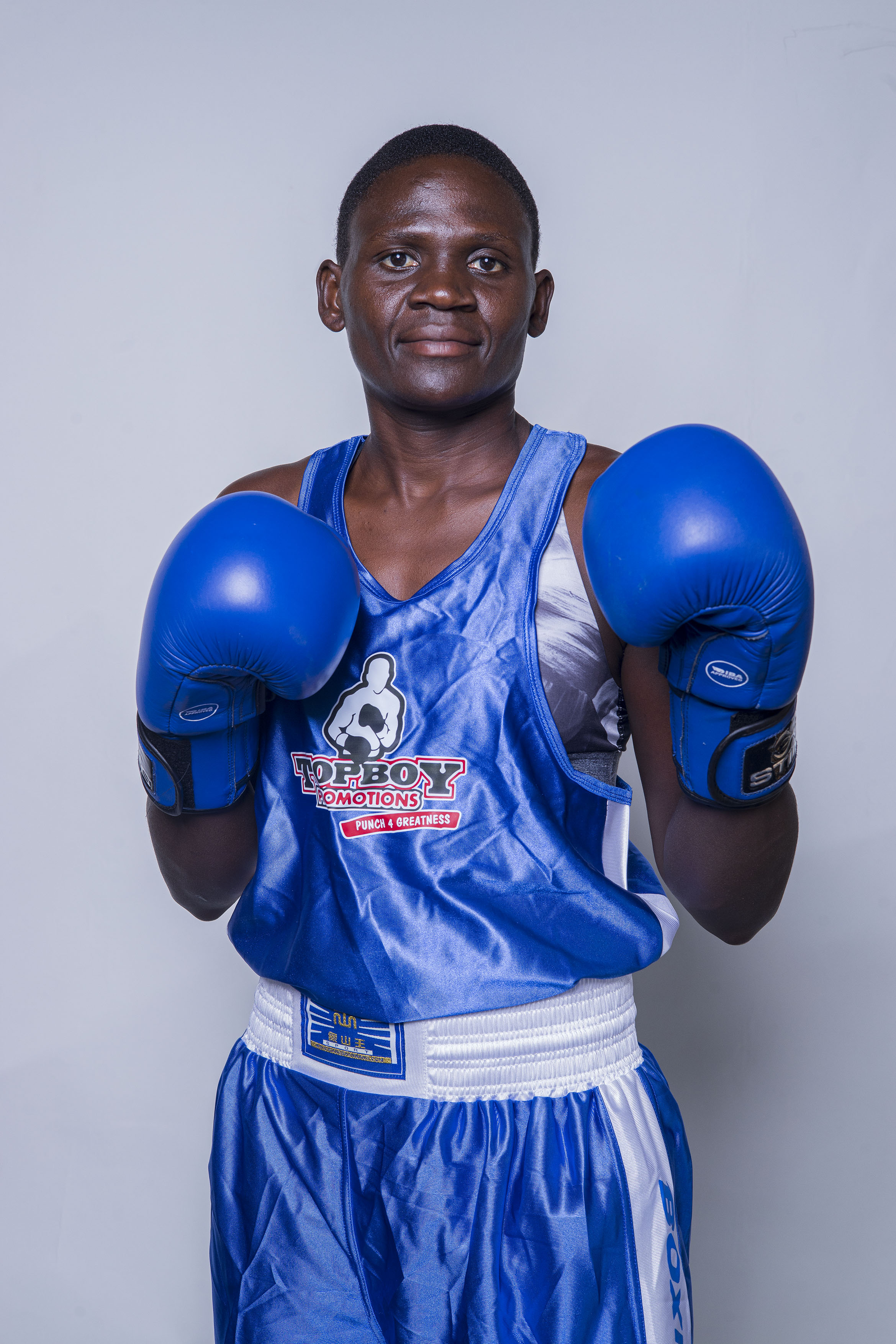

Personal information
- Nickname: Golola
- Nationality: Ugandan
- Born: Emily Kyomugisha; January 20, 1994 (age 32) Mbarara District, Uganda
- Weight: Welterweight

Boxing career
Medal record
Women's boxing
Representing Uganda
2018 East Africa Games
Gold medal – first place	2018 Burundi	Welterweight
2020 African Boxing Olympic Qualification Tournament
Bronze medal – third place	2020 Dakar, Senegal	Welterweight

Emily Nakalema (born Emily Kyomugisha, January 20, 1994) is a Ugandan female boxer competing in the welterweight division. As of July 2019, she was the captain of Uganda's national female boxers team, the She Bombers. She is also a bronze medal winner at the 2020 African Boxing Olympic Qualification Tournament.

== Background and education ==
Emily Nakalema was born Emily Kyomugisha to Samuel and Teopista Kyomugisha in Mbarara and is the third born in a family of five. She attended Kulumba Primary School after which she joined Allied Secondary School for her first year of secondary school. She was later admitted to Citizen High School, Mbarara on a sports bursary after which she dropped out of school in 2016 and moved to Kampala city.

== Involvement in sports ==
Emily Nakalema started out playing football and featured for Mbarara United FC in regional tours before moving to Kampala and eventually taking up boxing in 2018.

She boxes under a local club, Katwe Boxing Club and has also represented Uganda at regional and continental level.

== Honors ==
- Gold medal – 2018 East African Community Games
- Bronze medal – 2020 African Boxing Olympic Qualification Tournament
