= Priyanka Dhillon =

Canadian boxer (born 1993)

Personal information
- Born: January 24, 1993 (age 33) Winnipeg, Manitoba, Canada
- Height: 169 cm (5 ft 7 in)
- Weight: 48 kg (106 lb)

Boxing career
- Weight class: Minimumweight
Medal record
Women's amateur boxing
Representing Canada
Commonwealth Games
Bronze medal – third place	2022 Birmingham	Minimumweight

Priyanka Dhillon (born January 24, 1993) is a Canadian minimum weight boxer. She competed at the 2022 Commonwealth Games, in the Minimum weight division, winning a bronze medal.

== Life ==
During her high school years, Dhillon was a track athlete at Sisler High School.

Dhillon was the first boxer from Manitoba to compete at the IBA World Championships.
