= Jorge Dias =

Jorge Dias may refer to:

- Jorge Dias (ethnologist) (1907-1953), Portuguese ethnologist
- Jorge Dias (engineer) (fl. 2000-present), Portuguese electrical engineer, author, and academic
