= Fatiha Mansouri =

Algerian boxer (born 1997)

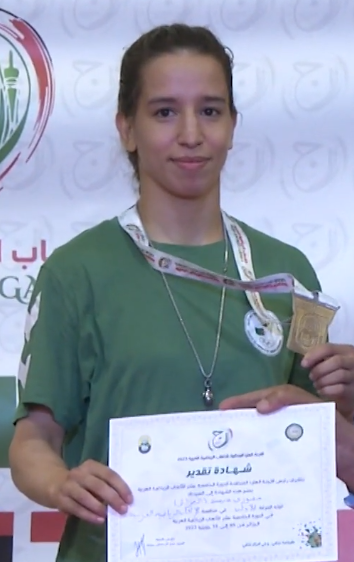
- Mansouri in 2023 Arab Games

Personal information
- Born: 23 March 1997 (age 29) Mascara, Algeria

Sport
- Country: Algeria
- Sport: Boxing
- Weight class: 48 kg
Medal record
Women's boxing
Representing Algeria
African Games
Gold medal – first place	2023 Accra	48 kg
Mediterranean Games
Silver medal – second place	2026 Taranto	51 kg
Islamic Solidarity Games
Bronze medal – third place	2025 Riyadh	51 kg
Arab Games
Gold medal – first place	2023 Algiers	48 kg
African Championships
Silver medal – second place	2022 Maputo	48 kg
Silver medal – second place	2023 Yaoundé	48 kg

Fatiha Mansouri (Arabic: فتيحة منصوري, born 23 March 1997) is an Algerian boxer competing in the minimumweight (48 kg) division. She won the gold medal in the women's 48 kg event at the 2023 African Games held in Accra, Ghana. She also won the gold medal in her event at the 2023 Arab Games held in Algiers, Algeria.

== Career ==
In 2019, Mansouri competed in the light flyweight event at the AIBA Women's World Boxing Championships held in Ulan-Ude, Russia. She also competed in the minimumweight event at the 2022 IBA Women's World Boxing Championships held in Istanbul, Turkey. She was eliminated in her first match in both events.

Mansouri represented Algeria at the 2022 Mediterranean Games held in Oran, Algeria. She competed in the women's light flyweight event where she was eliminated in her first match. In the same year, Mansouri won the silver medal in her event at the African Amateur Boxing Championships held in Maputo, Mozambique. In the final, she lost against Margret Tembo of Zambia.

In 2023, Mansouri competed in the minimumweight event at the IBA Women's World Boxing Championships held in New Delhi, India. A few months later, she won the gold medal in the women's 48 kg event at the 2023 Arab Games held in Algiers, Algeria. In August 2023, Mansouri won the silver medal in her event at the African Amateur Boxing Championships held in Yaoundé, Cameroon.

In 2024, Mansouri won the gold medal in the women's 48 kg event at the 2023 African Games held in Accra, Ghana. She defeated Wafa Hafsi of Tunisia in her gold medal match.
