= Nina Radovanović =

Serbian boxer (born 1991)

Personal information
- Nationality: Serbian
- Born: 19 December 1991 (age 34) Belgrade, SFR Yugoslavia (present day Serbia)
- Height: 1.62 m (5 ft 4 in)
- Weight: Light-flyweight; Flyweight

Boxing career
Medal record
Women's amateur boxing
Representing Serbia
European Championships
Bronze medal – third place	2024 Belgrade	Light flyweight

Nina Radovanović (Serbian Cyrillic: Нина Радовановић; born 19 December 1991) is a Serbian boxer.

She was the first female boxer to represent Serbia in the Olympics when she competed in the flyweight division at the delayed 2020 Tokyo Games. In the professional boxing ranks, Radovanović won the IBO female flyweight World title in 2018. She won her second world title in 2024, claiming the IBO light-flyweight belt.
