= Winston Hill (boxer) =

Fijian boxer (born 1993)

Personal information
- Born: 17 September 1993 (age 32)
- Height: 1.72 m (5 ft 7 1/2 in)
- Weight: Welterweight

Boxing career

Boxing record
- Total fights: 2
- Wins: 0
- Win by KO: 2
- Losses: 0
- Draws: 0
- No contests: 0
Medal record
Men's amateur boxing
Representing Fiji
Commonwealth Games
Bronze medal – third place	2018 Gold Coast	Welterweight
Pacific Games
Silver medal – second place	2015 Port Moresby	Welterweight

Winston Hill MOF (born 17 September 1993) is a Fijian boxer. He competed in the men's welterweight event at the 2016 Summer Olympics, where he lost to Vladimir Margaryan in the first round.

Hill is of Rotuman descent. He won a silver medal at the 2015 Pacific Games in the Men's Welterweight division.
