= Joseph Essombe =

Cameroonian wrestler (born 1988)

Personal information
- Full name: Joseph Émilienne Essombe Tiako
- Nationality: Cameroonian
- Born: 22 March 1988 (age 38) Yaoundé, Cameroon

Sport
- Country: Cameroon
- Sport: Wrestling
- Weight class: 53 kg / 57 kg
- Event: Freestyle
Medal record
Women's freestyle wrestling
Representing Cameroon
African Championships
Gold medal – first place	2022 El Jadida	57 kg

Joseph Émilienne Essombe Tiako (born 22 March 1988) is a Cameroonian wrestler. She competed in the women's freestyle 53 kg event at the 2016 Summer Olympics, in which she was eliminated in the round of 16 by Betzabeth Argüello.

In March 2019, she won the silver medal in the women's freestyle 57 kg event at the 2019 African Wrestling Championships. In 2019, she also represented Cameroon at the 2019 African Games and she won the gold medal in the women's freestyle 53 kg event.

In 2020, she won the gold medal in the women's freestyle 53 kg event at the 2020 African Wrestling Championships. She qualified at the 2021 African & Oceania Wrestling Olympic Qualification Tournament to represent Cameroon at the 2020 Summer Olympics in Tokyo, Japan. She lost her bronze medal match in the women's 53 kg event.

She won the gold medal in her event at the 2022 African Wrestling Championships held in El Jadida, Morocco.

Olympic Games
Preceded by Wilfried Ntsengue	Flag bearer for Cameroon; 2020 Tokyo with Albert Mengue	Succeeded by Emmanuel Eseme; Richelle Anita Soppi Mbella
