= Roumaysa Boualam =

Algerian boxer (born 1994)

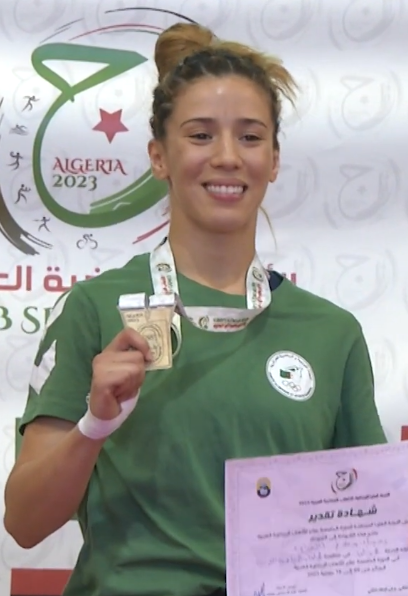
- Boualam in 2023

Personal information
- Nationality: Algerian
- Born: October 10, 1994 (age 31) Oran, Algeria
- Height: 1.60 m (5 ft 3 in)

Boxing career
- Stance: Orthodox

Boxing record
- Total fights: 47
- Wins: 28
- Win by KO: 2
- Losses: 19
- Draws: 0
- No contests: 0
Medal record
Women's boxing
Representing Algeria
African Games
Gold medal – first place	2019 Rabat	Flyweight
Gold medal – first place	2023 Accra	Light flyweight
African Championships
Gold medal – first place	2022 Maputo	Flyweight
Gold medal – first place	2023 Yaoundé	Light flyweight
Silver medal – second place	2014 Yaoundé	Flyweight
Silver medal – second place	2017 Brazzaville	Flyweight
Mediterranean Games
Gold medal – first place	2022 Oran	Minimumweight
Arab Games
Gold medal – first place	2023 Algiers	Flyweight

Roumaysa Boualam (Arabic: رميسة بوعلام; born 10 October 1994) is an Algerian amateur boxer. She won the gold medal in the women's minimumweight event at the 2022 Mediterranean Games held in Oran, Algeria. She is also a two-time gold medalist at the African Games. She competed at several editions of the IBA Women's World Boxing Championships.

== Career ==
In 2019, Boualam won the gold medal in the women's flyweight event at the African Games held in Rabat, Morocco. She defeated Yasmine Moutaqui of Morocco in her gold medal match.

In 2020, Boualam qualified at the African Olympic Qualification Tournament held in Diamniadio, Senegal to compete at the 2020 Summer Olympics in Tokyo, Japan. She is the first female boxer from Algeria to represent her country at the Summer Olympics. She competed in the women's flyweight event.

Boualam won the gold medal in her event at the 2022 African Amateur Boxing Championships held in Maputo, Mozambique.

In 2024, Boualam won the gold medal in the women's 50 kg event at the 2023 African Games held in Accra, Ghana.
