= Merven Clair =

Mauritian boxer (born 1993)

Personal information
- National team: Mauritius
- Born: 2 July 1993 (age 33) Beau Bassin-Rose Hill, Mauritius
- Height: 178 cm (5 ft 10 in)
- Weight: 75 kg (165 lb)

Sport
- Sport: Boxing
- Weight class: Welterweight
Medal record
Men's amateur boxing
Representing Mauritius
Commonwealth Games
Bronze medal – third place	2026 Glasgow	70 kg
African Games
Gold medal – first place	2019 Rabat	Welterweight
African Championships
Silver medal – second place	2017 Brazzaville	Welterweight
Indian Ocean Island Games
Gold medal – first place	2019 Mauritius	Welterweight
Gold medal – first place	2015 Réunion	Middleweight

Merven Clair (born 2 July 1993) is a Mauritian boxer. He competed at the 2016 Summer Olympics in the men's middleweight event, in which he was eliminated in the first round by Hosam Bakr Abdin. He also competed at the 2014 Commonwealth Games in the welterweight class where he was also eliminated in the first round, that time by Kenya's Rayton Okwiri. At the 68th edition of the Strandja Memorial in February 2017, he placed third after a defeat in the semifinals to eventual tournament winner Pat McCormack. At the 2017 African Boxing Championships in Brazzaville, Clair secured a silver medal in the 69 kg weight class, suffering his only defeat of the tournament in the final against Muzamiru Kakande from Uganda. He won the gold medal at the 2019 African Games in Rabat, Morocco in the welterweight class by defeating the Nigerian boxer Abdulafeez Osoba in the final. At the 2020 African Boxing Olympic Qualification Tournament, he was defeated in the quarterfinals by Stephen Zimba by referee stoppage in the second round.

He qualified to represent Mauritius at the 2020 Summer Olympics and competed in the men's welterweight event.

At the 2026 Commonwealth Games Clair won the bronze medal in the men's 70 kg event.

== Honours ==
Mauritius Sportsman of the Year 2019
