= Junior Mikamou =

Gabonese boxer

Personal information
- Full name: Mick "Junior" Mikamou Mayelet
- Nationality: Gabonese
- Born: 26 August 1989 (age 36)
- Height: 157 cm (5 ft 2 in)

Sport
- Sport: Boxing
- Club: Ogooue Maritime
Medal record
Men's Boxing
Representing Gabon
All-Africa Games / African Games
Bronze medal – third place	2007 Algiers	Light Flyweight (-48 kg)
Bronze medal – third place	2015 Brazzaville	Flyweight (-52 kg)

Mick "Junior" Mikamou Mayelet (born 26 August 1989), known as Junior Mikamou, is a Gabonese amateur boxer. Mikamou won a bronze medal at the 2007 All-Africa Games, losing to Manyo Plange of Ghana.
