= Phiwokuhle Mnguni =

South African boxer (born 2001)

Personal information
- Nationality: South African
- Born: Phiwokuhle Sbusisiwe Mnguni; 13 February 2001 (age 25)

Boxing career
Medal record
Women's amateur boxing
Representing South Africa
Commonwealth Games
Bronze medal – third place	2022 Birmingham	Featherweight

Phiwokuhle Sbusisiwe Mnguni (born 13 February 2001) is a South African featherweight boxer. She participated in the 2022 Commonwealth Games and secured South Africa's first women's boxing medal at the Commonwealth Games.
