= Eskerkhan Madiev =

Georgian boxer (born 1998)

Personal information
- Nationality: Georgian
- Born: 12 February 1998 (age 28) Achkhoy-Martan, Russia

Sport
- Sport: Boxing
Medal record
Men's amateur boxing
Representing Georgia
European Championships
Silver medal – second place	2024 Belgrade	Light middleweight

Eskerkhan Madiev (born 12 February 1998) is a Russian-born Georgian boxer of Chechen descent. He competed in the men's welterweight event at the 2020 Summer Olympics, representing Georgia.
