= Jorge Dias (engineer) =

- Born: Jorge Manuel Miranda Dias
- Occupations: Electrical engineer, author, and academic

Academic background
- Education: University of Coimbra: BEng, Electrical Engineering (Computer); PhD, Electrical Engineering; D.Sc., (Habilitation)

Academic work
- Institutions: Khalifa University
- Website: jorgedias.eu

Jorge Manuel Miranda Dias is an electrical engineer, author, and academic. He is a professor and deputy director at Khalifa University, where he also leads the Centre for Autonomous Robotic Systems (KUCARS). His research has focused on artificial perception, specifically in the fields of computer vision and robotics.

== Education ==
From the University of Coimbra (UC), Dias earned a degree in Electrical Engineering with a specialization in computers in 1984. He completed a PhD in Electrical Engineering at the same institution in 1994, followed by a D.Sc. (Habilitation) degree in 2011.

== Career ==
In 2000, Dias joined the UC as an associate professor. Since 2011, he is a professor at Khalifa University, where he holds the position of deputy director and leads the Centre for Autonomous Robotic Systems (KUCARS).

Alongside his academic appointments, Dias was the founding director of the Laboratory of Systems and Automation at the Instituto Pedro Nunes (IPN), a technology transfer institution associated with the UC, and served as IPN vice president from June 2008 to June 2011. In 2024, he was general chair of the IEEE/RSJ International Conference on Intelligent Robots and Systems (IROS) held in Abu Dhabi.

Dias coordinated the European project GrowMeUp on social robots for elderly care. He participated in the Seventh Framework Programme project SocialRobot, which ran from 2011 to 2015, and worked on ECOBOTICS.SEA, an EU-funded project on underwater robotics and marine ecosystem monitoring. He is a specialty chief editor of Robot Vision and Artificial Perception at Frontiers in Robotics and AI.
