= Catherine Nanziri =

Ugandan boxer

Personal information
- Nationality: Ugandan
- Born: 13 September 1999 (age 27) Kampala, Uganda

Sport
- Sport: Boxing

Catherine Nanziri (born 13 September 1999) is a Ugandan boxer. She competed in the women's flyweight event at the 2020 Summer Olympics.

== Boxing career ==
Nanziri began her boxing career in 2015 at Agrrey Memorial school having been inspired by players who used to train at the school. She dropped out of the sport to concentrate on her studies in order to finish her O level examinations. She however bounced back in 2018 after attending a certain competition where she saw her fellow girls excelling.

Nanziri started her road to the Olympics with domestic qualifiers aimed at selecting a team that would travel for the Olympic qualifiers in Dakar Senegal in 2020.

At the Olympics, Nanziri lost to Japanese Tsukimi Namiki but this did not put her down, it was the beginning of her confidence in the game.

== Personal life ==
Nanziri was born in Lweza to Vincent Lukyamuzi and Dorothy Nakitende and is the second born in family of five children.
