= Ichrak Chaib =

Algerian boxer (born 2001)

Personal information
- Nationality: Algerian
- Born: 16 January 2001 (age 25)

Boxing career
Medal record
Women's amateur boxing
Representing Algeria
World Championships
Bronze medal – third place	2022 Istanbul	Welterweight
African Games
Gold medal – first place	2023 Accra	Light-Welterweight
African Championships
Gold medal – first place	2023 Yaoundé	Light-Welterweight
Gold medal – first place	2022 Maputo	Welterweight
Mediterranean Games
Silver medal – second place	2022 Oran	Welterweight
Islamic Solidarity Games
Gold medal – first place	2025 Riyadh	65 kg

Ichrak Chaib (born 16 January 2001) is an Algerian boxer. She competed in the women's middleweight event at the 2020 Summer Olympics.
