= Khouloud Hlimi =

Tunisian boxer (born 1990)

Personal information
- Full name: Khouloud Hlimi Ep Moulahi
- Nationality: Tunisian
- Born: 5 February 1990 (age 36)

Sport
- Sport: Boxing
Medal record
Women's amateur boxing
Representing Tunisia
African Games
Gold medal – first place	2019 Rabat	Lightweight
Silver medal – second place	2015 Brazzaville	Lightweight
Bronze medal – third place	2023 Accra	Featherweight
African Championships
Silver medal – second place	2023 Yaoundé	Featherweight

Khouloud Hlimi (Arabic: خلود الحليمي, born 5 February 1990) is a Tunisian boxer. She competed in the women's featherweight event at the 2020 Summer Olympics.
