= Patrick Chinyemba =

Zambian boxer (born 2001)

Personal information
- Nickname: Bado
- Born: 3 January 2001 (age 25) Lusaka, Zambia
- Height: 160 cm (5 ft 3 in)

Sport
- Sport: Boxing
- Weight class: Flyweight
Medal record
Men's amateur boxing
Representing Zambia
IBA World Championships
Bronze medal – third place	2025 Dubai	Flyweight
Commonwealth Games
Bronze medal – third place	2022 Birmingham	Flyweight (-51 kg)
African Games
Gold medal – first place	2023 Accra	Flyweight (-51 kg)
African Championships
Gold medal – first place	2022 Maputo	Flyweight (-51 kg)

Patrick Chinyemba (born 3 January 2001) is a Zambian boxer. He competed in the men's flyweight event at the 2020 and 2024 Summer Olympics.

Chinyemba was selected to be part of Team Zambia for the Birmingham 2022 Commonwealth Games to compete under the flyweight boxing category.
