= Mohammed Houmri =

Algerian boxer (born 1993)

Personal information
- Nationality: Algerian
- Born: 13 March 1993 (age 33)

Sport
- Sport: Boxing
Medal record
Men's amateur boxing
Representing Algeria
Mediterranean Games
Silver medal – second place	2022 Oran	Light heavyweight
Bronze medal – third place	2018 Tarragona	Light heavyweight
African Games
Silver medal – second place	2023 Accra	Light heavyweight
Bronze medal – third place	2019 Rabat	Light heavyweight

Mohammed Houmri (born 13 March 1993) is an Algerian boxer. He competed in the men's light heavyweight event at the 2020 Summer Olympics.
