= Lethabo Modukanele =

Motswana boxer

Personal information
- Full name: Lethabo Bokamoso Modukanele
- Nationality: Botswana
- Born: 25 August 1996 (age 29)
- Height: 155 cm (5 ft 1 in)

Boxing career
- Weight class: 48–51 kg (106–112 lb)
Medal record
Women's amateur boxing
Representing Botswana
Commonwealth Games
Bronze medal – third place	2022 Birmingham	Minimumweight (−48 kg)
African Championships
Bronze medal – third place	2022 Maputo	−48 kg

Lethabo Bokamoso Modukanele (born 25 August 1996) is a Motswana boxer. She competed at the 2022 Commonwealth Games, winning the bronze medal in the women's minimumweight event.
