= Fiston Mbaya Mulumba =

Congolese boxer (born 1996)

Personal information
- Nationality: Congolese
- Born: 27 January 1996 (age 29)

Sport
- Sport: Boxing

Fiston Mbaya Mulumba (born 27 January 1996) is a Congolese boxer. He competed in the men's lightweight event at the 2020 Summer Olympics.
