= Wilfried Ntsengue =

Cameroonian boxer (born 1998)

Dieudonne Wilfred Seyi Ntsengue
Personal information
- Nationality: Cameroonian
- Born: 23 January 1998 (age 28) Yaoundé, Cameroon
- Height: 1.83 m (6 ft 0 in)
- Weight: Light-heavyweight

Boxing career
- Reach: 178 cm (70 in)
- Stance: Orthodox

Boxing record
- Total fights: 8
- Wins: 8
- Win by KO: 4
- Losses: 0
Medal record
Men's amateur boxing
Representing Cameroon
Commonwealth Games
Silver medal – second place	2018 Gold Coast	Middleweight
African Games
Gold medal – first place	2015 Brazzaville	Middleweight

Dieudonne Wilfred Seyi Ntsengue (born 23 January 1998) is a Cameroonian professional boxer. As an amateur he competed in the men's middleweight event at the 2016 Summer Olympics. He was defeated by Egypt's Hosam Bakr Abdin in the round of 16. He was the flag bearer for Cameroon for both the Parade of Nations during the opening ceremony and the closing ceremony.

He competed at the 2020 Summer Olympics in the men's middleweight event.

== Professional boxing record ==
10 fights	10 wins	0 losses
By knockout	4	0
By decision	6	0

No.	Result	Record	Opponent	Type	Round, time	Date	Location	Notes
10	Win	10-0	(Argentina) David Benitez	UD	8	Jun 02, 2022	Montreal Casino, Montreal, Canada	
9	Win	9-0	(Cameroon) Alexandre Jacques Mboudo Eloumou	UD	6	Feb 6, 2021	INJS Gymnasium, Yaounde, Cameroon	
8	Win	8-0	(Canada) Devin Tomko	TKO	8 (8) 2:56	Nov 23, 2019	Centre Videotron, Quebec City, Canada	
7	Win	7-0	(Mexico) Jair Sena	UD	6	Sep 20, 2019	Pierre-Charbonneau Centre, Montreal, Canada	
6	Win	6-0	(Mexico) Bryam Galvez	UD	6	Jun 28, 2019	Montreal Casino, Montreal, Canada	
5	Win	5–0	(Poland) Bartosz Barczynski	TKO	3 (4), 2:24	Jun 8, 2019	Montreal Casino, Montreal, Canada	
4	Win	4–0	(Mexico) Ismael Molina Moreno	UD	4	Mar 23, 2019	Montreal Casino, Montreal, Canada	
3	Win	3–0	(Mexico) Marco Antonio Morales	KO	1 (4)	Feb 16, 2019	Montreal Casino, Montreal, Canada	
2	Win	2–0	(Mexico) Fernando Galvan	TKO	3 (4), 2:35	Dec 01, 2018	Centre Videotron, Quebec City, Canada	
1	Win	1–0	(Gabon) Chanel Tessa Tonda	UD	4	Jun 10, 2017	Camp de l'Unite, Yaounde, Cameroon	

Olympic Games
Preceded by Annabelle Ali	Flagbearer for Cameroon; 2016 Rio de Janeiro	Succeeded by Joseph Essombe; Albert Mengue
