= Pat McCormack (boxer, born 1995) =

English boxer (born 1995)

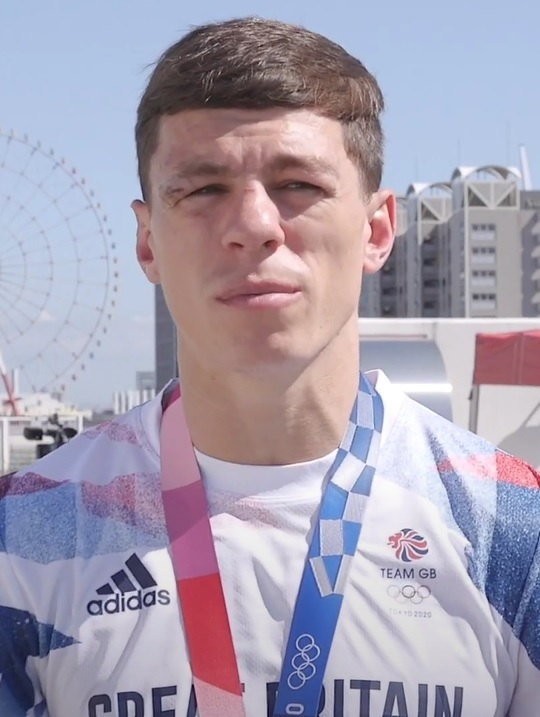
- McCormack in 2021

Personal information
- Nationality: English
- Born: 8 June 1995 (age 31) Sunderland, Tyne and Wear, England
- Height: 1.73 m (5 ft 8 in)

Boxing career
- Weight class: Light welterweight, Welterweight
- Stance: Orthodox

Boxing record
- Total fights: 9
- Wins: 8
- Win by KO: 6
- Losses: 1
Medal record
Men's amateur boxing
Representing Great Britain
Olympic Games
Silver medal – second place	2020 Tokyo	Welterweight
European Games
Gold medal – first place	2019 Minsk	Welterweight
European Championships
Silver medal – second place	2015 Samokov	Light welterweight
Representing England
World Championships
Silver medal – second place	2019 Yekaterinburg	Welterweight
European Championships
Silver medal – second place	2017 Kharkiv	Welterweight
EU Championships
Gold medal – first place	2018 Valladolid	Welterweight
Commonwealth Games
Gold medal – first place	2018 Gold Coast	Welterweight

Pat McCormack (born 8 June 1995) is an English professional boxer. As an amateur he won a silver medal at the delayed 2020 Summer Olympics and gold at both the 2018 Commonwealth Games and 2019 European Games.

== Amateur career ==
McCormack fought for Great Britain in the light welterweight category at the 2016 Rio Olympics, defeating Ablaikhan Zhussupov from Kazakhstan in his opening bout before losing via split decision in the round-of-16 to Cuban boxer Yasniel Toledo.

Representing England, McCormack won a gold medal in the welterweight division at the 2018 Commonwealth Games, with a win over Northern Ireland’s Aidan Walsh in the final.

A year later he took welterweight gold at the European Games in Minsk, Belarus, winning in the final against Russia’s Khariton Agrba by unanimous decision. At that year's World Championships in Yekaterinburg, Russia, he won the silver medal after losing 4:0 to Russian boxer Andrey Zamkovoy in the welterweight final which was stopped in the second round due to a cut suffered by McCormack following an accidental clash of heads.

In 2021, McCormack claimed a silver medal at the delayed Tokyo Olympics, losing to 2012 gold medallist Roniel Iglesias from Cuba in the welterweight final.

== Professional career ==
McCormack made his professional boxing debut on 25 March 2022, stopping Justin Menzie in round one at Newcastle Arena.

In October 2022, he signed a promotional contract with Eddie Hearn's Matchroom Boxing. McCormack won his first fight under the Matchroom banner on points against Christian Nicolas Andino at Wembley Arena on 26 November 2022.

Undefeated after five fights, he secured a unanimous decision win over Williams Andres Herrera in a 10 round contest at the Co-op Live Arena in Manchester on 26 October 2024.

At the same venue on 15 February 2025, McCormack defeated Robbie Davies Jr, knocking his opponent to the canvas three times during the contest which was halted by corner retirement at the end of round six.

McCormack faced Miguel Parra in an eliminator for a shot at the WBA welterweight title at Rainton Meadows Arena in Houghton-le-Spring on 6 September 2025, winning the contest when his opponent retired on his stool at the ninth round.

He fought Conah Walker for the vacant IBF Intercontinental and WBA International welterweight titles at Salle des Étoiles in Monte Carlo on 6 December 2025. McCormack lost by knockout in the final round when a barrage of punches from his opponent sent him tumbling through the ropes and unable to beat the referee's 10 count.

== Personal life ==
McCormack has a twin brother called Luke who is also a professional boxer.

== Professional boxing record ==
9 fights	8 wins	1 loss
By knockout	6	1
By decision	2	0

No.	Result	Record	Opponent	Type	Round, time	Date	Location	Notes
9	Loss	8–1	Conah Walker	KO	12 (12), 2:16	6 Dec 2025	Salle des Étoiles, Monte Carlo, Monaco	For vacant IBF Intercontinental and WBA International welterweight titles
8	Win	8–0	Miguel Parra	RTD	9 (10), 3:00	6 Sep 2025	Rainton Meadows Arena, Houghton-le-Spring, England	Eliminator for a shot at the WBA welterweight title
7	Win	7–0	Robbie Davies Jr	RTD	6 (10) 3:00	15 Feb 2025	Co-op Live Arena, Manchester, England	
6	Win	6–0	Williams Andres Herrera	UD	10	26 Oct 2024	Co-op Live Arena, Manchester, England	
5	Win	5–0	Tony Dixon	RTD	4 (10) 3:00	1 Jul 2023	Sheffield Arena, Sheffield, England	
4	Win	4–0	Dario Socci	TKO	8 (8) 2:12	18 Mar 2023	Newcastle Arena, Newcastle, England	
3	Win	3–0	Christian Nicolas Andino	PTS	6	26 Nov 2022	Wembley Arena, London, England	
2	Win	2–0	Dimitri Trenel	TKO	1 (6) 1:26	30 Jul 2022	Vertu Motors Arena, Newcastle, England	
1	Win	1–0	Justin Menzie	TKO	1 (6) 1:38	25 Mar 2022	Newcastle Arena, Newcastle, England	
