= David Ssemujju =

Ugandan boxer (born 1992)

Personal information
- Nickname: De Animal
- Nationality: Ugandan
- Born: David Kavuma Ssemujju; 11 November 1992 (age 33) Kampala, Uganda
- Height: 5 ft 9 in (175 cm)
- Weight: Welterweight

Boxing career
- Reach: 71 in (180 cm)
- Stance: Orthodox

Boxing record
- Total fights: 12
- Wins: 9
- Win by KO: 5
- Losses: 2
- Draws: 1

Kavuma David Ssemujju also known as (De Animal) was born on 11 November 1992, and is a Ugandan boxer. He competed in the men's middleweight event at the 2020 Summer Olympics where he lost to the Algerian boxer Nemouchi Younes while competing in the men's middle weight category (69–75 kg)

== Professional boxing record ==
12 fights	9 wins	2 losses
By knockout	5	1
By decision	4	1
Draws	1	

No.	Result	Record	Opponent	Type	Round, time	Date	Location	Notes
12	Loss	9–2–1	Jin Sasaki	KO	6 (10), 0:58	21 Sep 2026	Tokyo Tama Mirai Messe, Hachioji, Japan	Lost WBO Asia Pacific and Japanese welterweight titles; For OPBF welterweight title
11	Draw	9–1–1	Masayuki Urashima	MD	10	24 Mar 2026	Korakuen Hall, Tokyo, Japan	Retained WBO Asia Pacific and Japanese welterweight titles
10	Win	9–1	Kosei Nogami	TKO	8 (10), 2:58	21 Aug 2025	Korakuen Hall, Tokyo, Japan	Retained Japanese welterweight title; Won vacant WBO Asia Pacific welterweight title
9	Win	8–1	Naoki Minagawa	UD	10	23 Mar 2025	Act City, Hamamatsu, Japan	Retained Japanese welterweight title
8	Win	7–1	Takeru Kobata	UD	10	12 Dec 2024	Korakuen Hall, Tokyo, Japan	Retained Japanese welterweight title
7	Win	6–1	Aso Ishiwaki	TKO	7 (10), 1:55	27 Aug 2024	Korakuen Hall, Tokyo, Japan	Won vacant Japanese welterweight title
6	Loss	5–1	Kamronbek Eshmatov	SD	8	8 Jun 2024	Foshan, China	
5	Win	5–0	Hiroya Nojima	UD	8	31 Mar 2024	Aioi Hall, Kariya, Japan	
4	Win	4–0	Kenedy Ayoo	TKO	5 (8), 2:01	29 Jul 2023	Club Obligato, Kampala, Uganda	Won vacant Ugandan middleweight title
3	Win	3–0	Herbert Mugarura	KO	3 (8)	15 Oct 2022	MTN Arena Lugogo, Kampala, Uganda	
2	Win	2–0	Samali Ntambi	TKO	1 (6)	23 Jul 2022	MTN Arena Lugogo, Kampala, Uganda	
1	Win	1–0	Hamza Latigo	UD	6	1 Apr 2022	Phillip Omondi Stadium, Kampala, Uganda	
