= Marcelat Sakobi Matshu =

Congolese boxer (born 1996)

Personal information
- Nationality: Democratic Republic of the Congo
- Born: 29 March 1996 (age 29)

Sport
- Sport: Boxing

Marcelat Sakobi Matshu (born 29 March 1996) is a boxer from the Democratic Republic of the Congo. She competed in the 2020 Summer Olympics.

Olympic Games
Preceded by Rosa Keleku	Flag bearer for Democratic Republic of the Congo; 2020 Tokyo with David Tshama	Succeeded by Brigitte Mbabi; Dominique Lasconi Mulamba
