= Youness Baalla =

Moroccan boxer (born 1999)

Personal information
- Nationality: Moroccan
- Born: Youness Baalla; 25 April 1999 (age 27) Casablanca, Morocco
- Weight: Heavyweight

Boxing career

Boxing record
- Total fights: 5
- Wins: 2
- Win by KO: 2
- Losses: 1
- Draws: 1
- No contests: 1

Youness Baalla (born 25 April 1999) is a Moroccan boxer. He competed in the men's heavyweight event at the 2020 Summer Olympics.

== Career ==
Baalla won the silver medal at the 2019 All-African Games in Rabat in the heavyweight category. He qualified for the 2020 Tokyo Olympics via the African Olympic Qualification Tournament in Dakar in March 2020.

Baalla was disqualified at the 2020 Summer Olympics in Tokyo after trying to bite his opponent David Nyika's ear in round 16 of the -91 kg event.

== Professional boxing record ==
5 fights	2 wins	1 loss
By knockout	2	0
By decision	0	1
Draws	1	
No contests	1	

No.	Result	Record	Opponent	Type	Round	Date	Location	Notes
5	Loss	2–1–1 (1)	Dante Stone	UD	6	13 Aug 2025	Kingdom Arena, Riyadh, Saudi Arabia	WBC Grand Prix Heavyweight Quarterfinals
4	NC	2–0–1 (1)	Lazizbek Mullojonov	NC	6	21 Jun 2025	Cool Arena, Riyadh, Saudi Arabia	WBC Grand Prix Heavyweight Round of 16; Originally UD win for Mullojonov, changed to NC after Mullojonov failed drug test
3	Draw	2–0–1	Morten Givskov	UD	6	20 Apr 2025	Global Theater Boulevard Riyadh City, Riyadh, Saudi Arabia	WBC Grand Prix Heavyweight Round of 32
2	Win	2–0	Ramazi Gogichashvili	RTD	2 (6), 0:45	18 May 2024	Oost Campus, Oostkamp, West-Vlaanderen, Belgium	
1	Win	1–0	Ferenc Zsalek	KO	1 (6), 1:39	23 Dec 2023	Bouwhuis, Mechelen, Antwerpen, Belgium	
