= Elly Ochola =

Kenyan boxer

Personal information
- Nationality: Kenyan
- Born: 10 May 1983 (age 43)

Sport
- Sport: Boxing

Elly Ochola (born 10 May 1983) is a Kenyan boxer. He competed in the men's heavyweight event at the 2020 Summer Olympics.
