= Jessie Lartey =

Ghanaian boxer

Personal information
- Born: 18 January 1993 (age 33)

Sport
- Sport: Boxing
Medal record
Men's amateur boxing
Representing Ghana
Commonwealth Games
Bronze medal – third place	2018 Gold Coast	Light welterweight

Jessie Lartey (born 18 January 1993) is a Ghanaian boxer. He represented Ghana at the 2018 Commonwealth Games, where he won a bronze medal.
