= Nick Okoth =

Kenyan boxer (born 1983)

Personal information
- Full name: Nicholas Okoth
- Nickname: "Nick"
- Nationality: Kenya
- Born: 3 March 1983 (age 43) Nairobi, Kenya
- Height: 1.63 m (5 ft 4 in)
- Weight: 57 kg (126 lb)

Sport
- Sport: Boxing
- Weight class: Featherweight
Medal record
Men's Boxing
Representing Kenya
Commonwealth Games
Bronze medal – third place	2010 Delhi	Bantamweight
African Games
Bronze medal – third place	2015 Brazzaville	Lightweight
African Championships
Gold medal – first place	2017 Brazzaville	Lightweight
African Military Championships
Bronze medal – third place	2015 Tunis	Lightweight

Nicholas Okongo Okoth (born 3 March 1983) is a Kenyan amateur boxer. He fought at the 2008 Olympics as a featherweight after winning the 2nd AIBA African 2008 Olympic Qualifying Tournament.

In Beijing he lost his debut to Arturo Santos Reyes.

Okoth grew up in the Mathare slums of Nairobi with three brothers who would also become boxers. The four of them, along with a cousin, trained at Undugu Amateur Boxing Club.

He qualified to represent Kenya at the 2020 Summer Olympics.
