= Rabab Cheddar =

Moroccan boxer (born 1991)

Personal information
- Nationality: Moroccan
- Born: 7 March 1991 (age 35)

Sport
- Sport: Boxing
Medal record
Women's amateur boxing
Representing Morocco
African Games
Silver medal – second place	2023 Accra	Flyweight

Rabab Cheddar (born 7 March 1991) is a Moroccan boxer who has represented her country at international events. She competed in the women's flyweight event at the 2020 Summer Olympics.
