= Maxime Yegnong =

Cameroonian boxer (born 1994)

Personal information
- Nationality: Cameroonian
- Born: 13 January 1994 (age 31)

Sport
- Sport: Boxing

Maxime Yegnong Njieyo (born 13 January 1994) is a Cameroonian boxer. He competed in the men's super heavyweight event at the 2020 Summer Olympics.
