= Elizabeth Andiego =

Kenyan boxer (born 1986)

Elizabeth Adhiambo Andiego (born 21 August 1986 in Nairobi) is a Kenyan female boxer. At the 2012 Summer Olympics, she competed in the Women's middleweight competition, but was defeated in the first round. She also competed at the 2014 Commonwealth Games, again losing in the first round.

She originally participated in taekwondo, but switched to boxing in 2007. She coaches at BoxGirls Nairobi, being the head coach of a programme to interest women of all ages in boxing.

At the Olympic qualification event in Beijing, she lost to Lien Lotte of Norway, and therefore did not qualify for the 2012 Olympics. However, AIBA overturned the decision allowing Andiego to compete at the Olympics.
