= Shakul Samed =

Ghanaian boxer (born 1999)

Shakul Samed (born 17 March 1999) is a Ghanaian boxer. He is competing in the men's light heavyweight division in the 2020 Summer Olympics.

He comes from a family of boxers, with his brothers Bastir Samir and Issah Samir representing Ghana also at the Olympics.
