= Christine Ongare =

Kenyan boxer (born 1993)

Christine Ongare (born 26 November 1993) is a Kenyan boxer competing in the featherweight division. She represented Kenya at the 2018 Commonwealth Games in Gold Coast, Australia winning a bronze medal thus making her the first Kenyan woman to win a Commonwealth Games medal in boxing.

== Career ==
Christine Ongare participated in football and acrobatics before taking up boxing in 2011 in Kenya's Kariobangi Estate

Christine Ongare competed at the 2018 Commonwealth Games in Gold Coast, Australia. She was seeded for the featherweight tournament and lost to Northern Ireland's Carly McNaul. As of February 2020, she had qualified to represent Kenya at the since postponed 2020 Summer Olympics after beating Uganda's Catherine Nanziri at the 2020 African Boxing Olympic Qualification Tournament in Dakar, Senegal.

== Personal life ==
Born to a single mother in Eastlands, Nairobi, Ongare herself became a mother at 12 years of age.

== Appearances and honours ==
- 2012 AIBA Women's World Boxing Championships
- 2014 Commonwealth Games, Glasgow, Scotland
- 2018 Commonwealth Games, Gold Coast, Australia
- 2019 Africa Games, Morocco
- 2020 African Boxing Olympic Qualification Tournament, Dakar, Senegal
