= Stephen Zimba =

Zambian boxer (born 2001)

Personal information
- Nationality: Zambian
- Born: 10 January 2001 (age 25)

Sport
- Sport: Boxing
Medal record
Men's amateur boxing
Representing Zambia
Commonwealth Games
Silver medal – second place	2022 Birmingham	Men's welterweight

Stephen Zimba (born 10 January 2001) is a Zambian boxer. He competed in the men's welterweight event at the 2020 Summer Olympics.
