= Albert Mengue =

Cameroonian boxer (born 1999)

Personal information
- Nationality: Cameroonian
- Born: 18 April 1999 (age 27)

Sport
- Sport: Boxing

Albert Mengue (born 18 April 1999) is a Cameroonian boxer. He competed in the men's welterweight event at the 2020 Summer Olympics.

Olympic Games
| Preceded by Wilfried Ntsengue | Flag bearer for Cameroon; 2020 Tokyo with Joseph Essombe | Succeeded by Emmanuel Eseme; Richelle Anita Soppi Mbella |
