= Mohamed Assaghir =

Moroccan boxer (born 1993)

Personal information
- Nationality: Moroccan
- Born: 27 May 1993 (age 32); Agadir, Morocco

Sport
- Sport: Boxing

Mohamed Assaghir (also spelled Mohammed, born 27 May 1993) is a Moroccan boxer. He competed in the men's light heavyweight event at the 2020 Summer Olympics, and lost in the Round of 32 to the eventual bronze medalist Imam Khataev.
