= Naomie Yumba =

Congolese boxer (born 1999)

Personal information
- Nationality: Congolese
- Born: 26 June 1999 (age 27)

Sport
- Sport: Boxing

Naomie Yumba (born 26 June 1999) is a Congolese boxer. She competed in the women's lightweight event at the 2020 Summer Olympics.
