= David Tshama =

Congolese boxer (born 1996)

Personal information
- Full name: David Tshama Mwenekabwe
- Nationality: Congolese
- Born: 12 December 1996 (age 29) Lubumbashi, DR Congo

Boxing career
- Weight class: Middleweight
- Stance: Orthodox

Boxing record
- Total fights: 2
- Wins: 2
- Losses: 0

David Tshama Mwenekabwe (born 12 December 1996) is a Congolese professional boxer who has held the African middleweight title since 2020. As an amateur, he competed in the men's middleweight event at the 2020 Summer Olympics.

== Professional boxing record ==
2 fights	2 wins	0 losses
By decision	2	0

No.	Result	Record	Opponent	Type	Round, time	Date	Location	Notes
2	Win	2–0	(Republic of the Congo) Giresse Wingui	UD	6	10 Dec 2021	(Democratic Republic of the Congo) Au village Chez TEMBA, Kinshasa, DR Congo	
1	Win	1–0	(Democratic Republic of the Congo) Augustin Matata	PTS	12	19 Dec 2020	(Democratic Republic of the Congo) Studio Mama Angebi, Kinshasa, DR Congo	Won vacant African middleweight title

Olympic Games
Preceded by Rosa Keleku	Flag bearer for Democratic Republic of the Congo; 2020 Tokyo with Marcelat Sakobi Matshu	Succeeded by Brigitte Mbabi; Dominique Lasconi Mulamba
