= Keamogetse Kenosi =

Botswana boxer (born 1997)

Personal information
- Full name: Keamogetse Sadie Kenosi
- Nationality: Botswana
- Born: 17 January 1997 (age 29) Francistown, Botswana
- Height: 1.79 m (5 ft 10 in)

Sport
- Sport: Boxing
Medal record
Women's amateur boxing
Representing Botswana
African Youth Games
Gold medal – first place	2014 Gaborone	Lightweight (-60 kg)
African Games
Gold medal – first place	2019 Rabat	Featherweight (-57 kg)
Bronze medal – third place	2023 Accra	Featherweight (-57 kg)
African Championships
Gold medal – first place	2022 Maputo	Featherweight (-57 kg)

Keamogetse Sadie Kenosi (born 17 January 1997) is a Botswana boxer. She competed in the women's featherweight event at the 2020 Summer Olympics. She lost to Karriss Artingstall of Great Britain in the first round. Originally a netball player, Kenosi began boxing in 2015. She competed at the 2019 World Championships and won a gold medal at the 2019 African Games.
