= Rajab Mahommed =

Botswana boxer (born 1997)

Personal information
- Nationality: Botswana
- Born: 28 June 1997 (age 29)

Sport
- Sport: Boxing

Rajab Otukile Mahommed (born 28 June 1997) is a Botswana boxer. He competed in the men's flyweight event at the 2020 Summer Olympics. He lost to Yuberjen Martínez of Colombia in the first round.

Olympic Games
Preceded by Nijel Amos	Flag bearer for Botswana; 2020 Tokyo with Amantle Montsho	Succeeded by Letsile Tebogo; Maxine Egner
