= Loren Alfonso =

Azerbaijani boxer (born 1995)

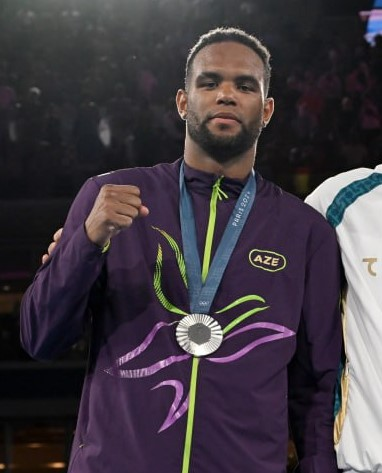
- Alfonso at the 2024 Summer Olympics

Personal information
- Nationality: Azerbaijani, Cuban
- Born: Loren Berto Alfonso Domínguez; 28 July 1995 (age 31) Havana, Cuba

Boxing career
Medal record
Men's amateur boxing
Representing Azerbaijan
Olympic Games
Silver medal – second place	2024 Paris	Heavyweight
Bronze medal – third place	2020 Tokyo	Light heavyweight
World Championships
Bronze medal – third place	2025 Liverpool	Heavyweight
IBA World Championships
Gold medal – first place	2021 Belgrade	Cruiserweight
Silver medal – second place	2023 Tashkent	Cruiserweight
Bronze medal – third place	2025 Dubai	Heavyweight
European Games
Gold medal – first place	2019 Minsk	Light heavyweight
European Championships
Bronze medal – third place	2024 Belgrade	Heavyweight

Loren Berto Alfonso Domínguez (born 28 July 1995) is a boxer who has competed in the light heavyweight, cruiserweight and heavyweight divisions. Born in Cuba, he represents Azerbaijan internationally. As an amateur, he is a gold medalist at the 2019 European Games, three-time medalist at the IBA World Championships, and a two-time Olympic Games medalist. He is also a bronze medalist at the 2024 European Championships and 2025 World Boxing Championships.

== Amateur career ==
=== Early career ===
Alfonso finished third in the middleweight division at the Cuban Championships in 2017 and third in 2018 and second in 2019 at the Azerbaijani Light Heavyweight Championships.

=== 2019 European Games and 2020 Summer Olympics ===
Alfonso won the gold medal at the 2019 European Games, defeating Stepan Hrekul, Mikhail Dauhaliavets, Ziad El Mohor, Simone Fiori and Benjamin Whittaker. With this success, he qualified for the 2019 World Championships in Yekaterinburg, where he reached the quarterfinals with victories against Gazimagomed Jalidov and Umar Jambekov, before he narrowly lost to Dilshodbek Ruzmetov in the quarterfinals.

At the European Olympic qualification in March 2020 in London, which was interrupted due to the COVID-19 pandemic and continued in June 2021 in Paris, Alfonso won the tournament with victories against Stepan Hrekul and Imam Khataev, as well as advancing without a fight due to the non-appearance of opponents Gazimagomed Jalidov and Benjamin Whittaker, thus qualifying him for the Summer Olympics in Tokyo. Competing in the men's light heavyweight event, he defeated Dilshodbek Ruzmetov in the round of 16 and Bayram Malkan in the quarterfinals, before being eliminated in the semifinals by Arlen López, winning a bronze medal.

=== 2021 and 2023 World Championships ===
At the 2021 World Championships in Belgrade, Alfonso won the gold medal in the newly created cruiserweight division. He defeated Tawfiqullah Sulaimani of the Fair Chance Team, Andrei Arădoaie from Romania, Sharabutdin Ataev from Russia, Herich Ruiz from Cuba and Keno Machado from Brazil. He won another World Championship medal in 2023 in Tashkent, after losing to Ataev in the final fight and thus winning silver.

=== 2024 European Championships and Summer Olympics ===
At the 2024 European Championships in Belgrade, Alfonso won a bronze medal. At the 2nd Olympic Qualification Tournament in June 2024 in Bangkok, he defeated Jonathan Tetteh from Ghana, Marko Ćalić from Croatia, Sanjeet Sanjeet from India and Erkin Adylbek Uulu from Kyrgyzstan, thus qualifying for the 2024 Summer Olympics.

Alfonso began his Olympic campaign by defeating the Cubas' Julio César La Cruz in the round of 16, before defeating Kazakhstan's Aibek Oralbay in the quarter-finals, both by split decision. He then defeated Spain's Enmanuel Reyes in the semifinal before losing to Lazizbek Mullojonov in the gold medal match.

=== 2025 World Boxing Championships and IBA Men's World Boxing Championships ===
At the 2025 World Boxing Championships, he won two fights, reaching the semi-finals and securing a medal. He lost to Isaías Ribeiro in the semifinals and finished the competition with a bronze medal.

At the 2025 IBA Men's World Boxing Championships in Dubai, Alfonso competed in the heavyweight division and won the silver medal. He began his campaign with a knockout victory over Argentina's Matías Verón, then defeated Moldova's Andrei Zaplitni by unanimous decision before losing to Uzbekistan's Turabek Khabibullaev by unanimous decision, the latter in whom won the silver medal.

== Professional career ==
Alfonso faced Sharabutdin Ataev for the IBA Pro World Cruiserweight Championship on 16 February 2024, at IBA Champions' Night held in Dushanbe, Tajikistan. After ten rounds, he lost the bout by unanimous decision.

== Personal life ==
In October 2021, Alfonso married an Azerbaijani woman named Nigar, who works as a banker in Baku.

== Professional boxing record ==
2 fights	1 win	1 loss
By decision	1	1

No.	Result	Record	Opponent	Type	Round, time	Date	Location	Notes
2	Loss	1–1	Sharabutdin Ataev	UD	10	16 February 2024	Tennis Palace and Water Sports Complex, Dushanbe, Tajikistan	For the IBA cruiserweight title.
1	Win	1–0	Aliaksei Alfiorau	SD	6	9 December 2023	The Agenda, Dubai, United Arab Emirates	
