= 2021 AIBA World Boxing Championships – Cruiserweight =

Cruiserweight at the 2021 AIBA World Boxing Championships
- Venue: Štark Arena
- Location: Belgrade, Serbia
- Dates: 27 October – 5 November
- Competitors: 32 from 32 nations

Medalists
gold medal	Loren Alfonso	Azerbaijan
silver medal	Keno Machado	Brazil
bronze medal	Victor Schelstraete	Belgium
bronze medal	Herich Ruiz	Cuba

The Cruiserweight competition at the 2021 AIBA World Boxing Championships was held between 27 October and 5 November.

== Results ==
=== Finals ===
Semifinals
(Belgium) Victor Schelstraete	0
(Brazil) Keno Machado	5
(Cuba) Herich Ruiz	1
(Azerbaijan) Loren Alfonso	4

Final
(Brazil) Keno Machado	2
(Azerbaijan) Loren Alfonso	3

=== Top half ===
==== Section 1 ====
First round
(Georgia (country)) Artyom Yordanyan	0
(Croatia) Damir Plantić	5
(Uzbekistan) Shokhjakhon Abdullaev
(Belgium) Victor Schelstraete	KO
(England) Conner Tudsbury	5
(Israel) Yan Zak	0
(Mexico) Rogelio Romero	3 (Note: The original decision was 3:2 in favour of Strnisko. Upon appeal by the Mexican Boxing Federation, a bout review jury reviewed the third round and overturned said decision.)
(Slovakia) Matúš Strnisko	2

Second round
(Croatia) Damir Plantić	0
(Belgium) Victor Schelstraete	5
(England) Conner Tudsbury	5
(Mexico) Rogelio Romero	0

Quarterfinals
(Belgium) Victor Schelstraete	3
(England) Conner Tudsbury	2

==== Section 2 ====
First round
(Brazil) Keno Machado	5
(Kazakhstan) Bek Nurmaganbet	0
(India) Lakshya Chahar
(South Korea) Kim Hyeong-kyu	RSC-I
(Poland) Sebastian Wiktorzak	5
(Moldova) Dmitri Cosciug	0
(Democratic Republic of the Congo) Christopher Luteke	4
(Venezuela) Nalek Korbaj	1

Second round
(Brazil) Keno Machado	5
(South Korea) Kim Hyeong-kyu	0
(Poland) Sebastian Wiktorzak	5
(Democratic Republic of the Congo) Christopher Luteke	0

Quarterfinals
(Brazil) Keno Machado	5
(Poland) Sebastian Wiktorzak	0

=== Bottom half ===
==== Section 3 ====
First round
(Hungary) Ádám Hámori	1
(Turkey) Burak Aksin	4
(Somalia) Ahmed Mohamed Adan	0
(Germany) Alexander Okafor	5
(Cuba) Herich Ruiz	ABD
(Serbia) Slobodan Jovanović
(Kenya) Hezron Maganga Sabat	0
(Jordan) Odai Al-Hindawi	5

Second round
(Turkey) Burak Aksin	5
(Germany) Alexander Okafor	0
(Cuba) Herich Ruiz	4
(Jordan) Odai Al-Hindawi	0

Quarterfinals
(Turkey) Burak Aksin	0
(Cuba) Herich Ruiz	5

==== Section 4 ====
First round
(Ukraine) Serhii Horskov	0
(Kyrgyzstan) Erkin Adylbek Uulu	5
(Lithuania) Tadas Tamašauskas
Sharabutdin Ataev	KO
(Romania) Paul Arădoaie	RSC
(Iran) Ali Jamali
Tawfiqullah Sulaimani	0
(Azerbaijan) Loren Alfonso	5

Second round
(Kyrgyzstan) Erkin Adylbek Uulu	1
Sharabutdin Ataev	4
(Romania) Paul Arădoaie	0
(Azerbaijan) Loren Alfonso	5

Quarterfinals
Sharabutdin Ataev	1
(Azerbaijan) Loren Alfonso	4
