= 2019 AIBA World Boxing Championships – Light heavyweight =

Light heavyweight at the 2019 AIBA World Boxing Championships
- Venue: Ekaterinburg Expo
- Location: Yekaterinburg, Russia
- Dates: 10–21 September
- Competitors: 49 from 49 nations

Medalists
gold medal	Bekzad Nurdauletov	Kazakhstan
silver medal	Dilshodbek Ruzmetov	Uzbekistan
bronze medal	Julio César La Cruz	Cuba
bronze medal	Benjamin Whittaker	England

The Light heavyweight competition at the 2019 AIBA World Boxing Championships was held from 10 to 21 September 2019.

== Schedule ==
The schedule was as follows:

Date	Time	Round
Tuesday 10 September 2019	15:00	First round
Sunday 15 September 2019	19:00	Second round
Tuesday 17 September 2019	21:00	Third round
Wednesday 18 September 2019	20:00	Quarterfinals
Friday 20 September 2019	20:00	Semifinals
Saturday 21 September 2019	20:30	Final

All times are Yekaterinburg Time (UTC+5)

== Results ==
=== Finals ===
Semi-finals
(Cuba) Julio César La Cruz	1
(Kazakhstan) Bekzad Nurdauletov	4
(England) Benjamin Whittaker	0
(Uzbekistan) Dilshodbek Ruzmetov	5

Final
(Kazakhstan) Bekzad Nurdauletov	5
(Uzbekistan) Dilshodbek Ruzmetov	0

=== Top half ===
==== Section 1 ====
First round
(Saudi Arabia) Salman Hamadah
(Algeria) Mohamed Houmri	RSC
(Lithuania) Paulius Zujevas	1
(Philippines) John Marvin	4
(Croatia) Matej Uremović	0
(France) Gaëtan Ntambwe	5
(Estonia) Stiven Aas
(Belarus) Mikhail Dauhaliavets	RSC
(Wales) Sammy Lee	5
(Jordan) Odai Al-Hindawi	0

Second round
(Cuba) Julio César La Cruz	5
(Algeria) Mohamed Houmri	0
(Philippines) John Marvin
(France) Gaëtan Ntambwe	w/o
(Moldova) Andrei Chiriacov	0
(Belarus) Mikhail Dauhaliavets	5
(Wales) Sammy Lee	1
(Russia) Georgy Kushitashvili	4

Third round
(Cuba) Julio César La Cruz	5
(France) Gaëtan Ntambwe	0
(Belarus) Mikhail Dauhaliavets	0
(Russia) Georgy Kushitashvili	5

Quarterfinals
(Cuba) Julio César La Cruz	5
(Russia) Georgy Kushitashvili	0

==== Section 2 ====
First round
(Republic of Ireland) Kane Tucker	0
(Kyrgyzstan) Erkin Adylbek Uulu	5
(Kazakhstan) Bekzad Nurdauletov	5
(South Korea) Hong In-gi	0
(Poland) Mateusz Goiński	0
(India) Brijesh Yadav	5
(Colombia) Diego Motoa	0
(Switzerland) Uke Smajli	5

Second round
(Brazil) Keno Machado	5
(Kyrgyzstan) Erkin Adylbek Uulu	0
(Kazakhstan) Bekzad Nurdauletov	5
(Venezuela) Nalek Korbaj	0
(Turkey) Bayram Malkan	4
(India) Brijesh Yadav	1
(Switzerland) Uke Smajli	1
(Germany) Ibragim Bazuev	4

Third round
(Brazil) Keno Machado	1
(Kazakhstan) Bekzad Nurdauletov	4
(Turkey) Bayram Malkan	3
(Germany) Ibragim Bazuev	2

Quarterfinals
(Kazakhstan) Bekzad Nurdauletov	4
(Turkey) Bayram Malkan	0

=== Bottom half ===
==== Section 3 ====
First round
(Sweden) Liridon Nuha	1
(Tajikistan) Shabbos Negmatulloev	4
(New Zealand) Jerome Pampellone	5
(Hungary) Pál Kovács	0
(Australia) Jack Bowen	5
(China) Zhang Jilei	0
(Slovakia) Matúš Strnisko	1
(Iran) Ehsan Rouzbahani	4

Second round
(Egypt) Abdelrahman Oraby	4
(Tajikistan) Shabbos Negmatulloev	1
(New Zealand) Jerome Pampellone	5
(Belgium) Ziad El Mohor	0
(Turkmenistan) Nurýagdy Nurýagdyýew	3
(Australia) Jack Bowen	2
(Iran) Ehsan Rouzbahani	2
(England) Benjamin Whittaker	3

Third round
(Egypt) Abdelrahman Oraby	0
(New Zealand) Jerome Pampellone	5
(Turkmenistan) Nurýagdy Nurýagdyýew	0
(England) Benjamin Whittaker	5

Quarterfinals
(New Zealand) Jerome Pampellone	1
(England) Benjamin Whittaker	4

==== Section 4 ====
First round
(Uzbekistan) Dilshodbek Ruzmetov	5
(Mongolia) Narmandakhyn Shinebayar	0
(Netherlands) Artjom Kasparian	4
(Armenia) Artush Hovhhanisyan	1
(Austria) Umar Dzambekov	5
(Japan) Ren Umemura	0
(Spain) Gazimagomed Jalidov	RSC
(Serbia) Aleksa Marković

Second round
(Democratic Republic of the Congo) Pita Kabeji	0
(Uzbekistan) Dilshodbek Ruzmetov	5
(Netherlands) Artjom Kasparian	2
(Romania) Paul Arădoaie	3
(United States) Atif Oberlton	2
(Austria) Umar Dzambekov	3
(Spain) Gazimagomed Jalidov	2
(Azerbaijan) Loren Alfonso	3

Third round
(Uzbekistan) Dilshodbek Ruzmetov	5
(Romania) Paul Arădoaie	0
(Austria) Umar Dzambekov	1
(Azerbaijan) Loren Alfonso	4

Quarterfinals
(Uzbekistan) Dilshodbek Ruzmetov	3
(Azerbaijan) Loren Alfonso	2
