= Bek Nurmaganbet =

Kazakhstani boxer (born 1998)

Personal information
- Born: 13 February 1998 (age 28) Shymkent, Kazakhstan
- Height: 6 ft 1 in (1.85 m)
- Weight: Super middleweight

Boxing career
- Stance: Southpaw

Boxing record
- Total fights: 17
- Wins: 17
- Win by KO: 15

Bek Nurmaganbet (born 13 February 1998) is a Kazakhstani professional boxer who competes in the super middleweight division.

== Professional career ==
On the undercard of Aidos Yerbossynuly vs Lennox Allen, Nurmaganbet defeated Bruno Sandoval to win his first professional belt, the WBA International title. He fought Joshua Conley on the undercard of Canelo Álvarez vs Édgar Álvarez on September 14, 2024, and won by stoppage in the second round.

Nurmaganbet was scheduled to face Steven Sumpter in Las Vegas on September 10, 2025. He won when his opponent retired at the end of the third round. Nurmaganbet knocked out Marcos Vazquez in the first round at Kingdom Arena in Riyadh, Saudi Arabia, on October 31, 2026.

== Professional boxing record ==
17 fights	17 wins	0 losses
By knockout	15	0
By decision	2	0

No.	Result	Record	Opponent	Type	Round, time	Date	Location	Notes
17	Win	17–0	Marcos Vazquez	KO	1 (10), 2:57	31 Oct 2026	Kingdom Arena, Riyadh, Saudi Arabia	
16	Win	16–0	Artysh Lopsan	TKO	5 (8), 2:26	25 Jul 2026	Baluan Sholak Sports Palace, Almaty, Kazakhstan	
15	Win	15–0	Steven Sumpter	RTD	3 (10), 3:00	10 Sep 2025	Fontainebleau Las Vegas, Winchester, Nevada, U.S.	
14	Win	14–0	Encarnacion Diaz	TKO	1 (6), 2:23	5 Apr 2025	2300 Arena, Philadelphia, Pennsylvania, U.S.	
13	Win	13–0	Joaquin Murrieta Lucio	KO	2 (8), 2:25	25 Oct 2024	Soboda Casino, San Jacinto, California, U.S.	
12	Win	12–0	Joshua Conley	TKO	2 (6), 2:24	14 Sep 2024	T-Mobile Arena, Las Vegas, Nevada, U.S.	
11	Win	11–0	Abimbola Osundairo	TKO	3 (6), 1:40	30 Sep 2023	T-Mobile Arena, Las Vegas, Nevada, U.S.	
10	Win	10–0	Argenis Espana	TKO	2 (8), 1:06	6 May 2023	Estadio Akron, Zapopan, Jalisco, Mexico	
9	Win	9–0	Heber Rondon	KO	1 (8), 2:30	15 Apr 2023	The Derby Room Pomona at Fairplex, Pomona, California, U.S.	
8	Win	8–0	Luciano Chaparro Araujo	TKO	3 (8), 0:34	22 Oct 2022	Plaza de Toros Mexico, Mexico City, Mexico	
7	Win	7–0	Khainell Wheeler	TKO	2 (6), 1:18	4 Jun 2022	The Armory, Minneapolis, Minnesota, U.S	
6	Win	6–0	Jose Miguel Torres	KO	1 (8), 2:17	24 Dec 2021	USC Soviet Wings, Russia	
5	Win	5–0	Bruno Sandoval	TKO	1 (10), 2:18	20 Nov 2021	Jekpe-Jek Arena, Astana, Kazakhstan	
4	Win	4–0	Twahu Kassimu	UD	8	May 20, 2021	Locomotiv Arena, Novosibirsk, Russia	
3	Win	3–0	Emmanuel Danso	TKO	6 (6), 2:40	Dec 16 2020	Jekpe-Jek Arena, Astana, Kazakhstan	
2	Win	2–0	Dulla Mbabe	UD	6	31 Oct 2020	Atyrau, Kazakhstan	
1	Win	1–0	Tamas Laska	KO	1 (6), 2:24	26 Jul 2020	DiaMond, Minsk, Belarus	
