= Jerkic =

Jerkic or Jerkić is a surname. Notable people with the surname include:

- Rocky Jerkic (born 1989), Australian boxer
- Željko Jerkić, Bosnian–Herzegovinian diplomat
- Edward Jerkic (born 1974), United States, US Army Soldier

== See also ==
- Jeric
