= Victor Schelstraete =

Belgian boxer

Personal information
- Nationality: Belgium
- Born: January 14, 1996 (age 30) Ostend, Belgium
- Height: 1.90 m (6 ft 3 in)

Boxing career
Medal record
Men's amateur boxing
Representing Belgium
IBA World Championships
Bronze medal – third place	2021 Belgrade	Cruiserweight

Victor Schelstraete (born 14 January 1996) is a Belgian boxer. He competed at the 2021 AIBA World Boxing Championships, winning the bronze medal in the cruiserweight event. Schelstraete secured a quota place for the 2024 Summer Olympics in Paris, France at the last qualifier event on the Boxing Road to Paris, the 2024 World Boxing Olympic Qualification Tournament 2 held at the Indoor Stadium Huamark in Bangkok, Thailand. At the Olympics, he reached the quarter-finals where he lost to the Spanish boxer Enmanuel Reyes.
