= Rafayel Hovhannisyan =

Armenian boxer (born 2001)

Personal information
- Nationality: Armenian
- Born: 16 June 2001 (age 25) Yerevan, Armenia
- Weight: Cruiserweight; Light heavyweight

Boxing career

Boxing record
- Total fights: 1
- Wins: 1
Medal record
Men's amateur boxing
Representing Armenia
IBA World Championships
Bronze medal – third place	2025 Dubai	Cruiserweight
European Championships
Silver medal – second place	2022 Yerevan	Cruiserweight

Rafayel Hovhannisyan (born 16 June 2001) is an Armenian professional boxer. As an amateur, he is a silver medalist at the European Amateur Boxing Championships and bronze medalist at the IBA Men's World Boxing Championships.

== Amateur career ==
In May 2022, Hovhannisyan was named to the Armenian squad for the 2022 European Amateur Boxing Championships. Competing in the cruiserweight division, he reached the finals, where he lost to Georgii Kushitashvili in the gold medal match.

Hovhannisyan also competed at the 2023 IBA Men's World Boxing Championships, once again in the cruiserweight category, where he lost to Kushitashvili in the quarterfinals.

In 2024, Hovhannisyan competed in the light heavyweight division at the 2024 World Boxing Olympic Qualification Tournament 1 and 2.

Hovhannisyan competed in the cruiserweight category at the 2025 IBA Men's World Boxing Championships in Dubai, United Arab Emirates. He defeated Yan Zak in the round of 16 and Marlo Delgado in the quarterfinals. In the semi-final, Hovhannisyan lost to Aliaksei Alfiorau by knockout, winning a bronze medal.

== Professional career ==
In his professional debut, Hovhannisyan faced Otari Gogoberishvili at the Karen Demirchyan Sports Complex in Yerevan, Armenia on 26 October 2024. After six rounds, he won the bout by unanimous decision.

== Professional boxing record ==
1 fight	1 win	0 losses
By decision	1	0

No.	Result	Record	Opponent	Type	Round, time	Date	Location	Notes
1	Win	1–0	Otari Gogoberishvili	UD	6	26 October 2024	Karen Demirchyan Sports Complex, Yerevan, Armenia	
