= Boxing at the 2023 Pan American Games – Men's 92 kg =

Men's 92 kg at the 2023 Pan American Games
- Venue: Olympic Training Center
- Start date: October 20, 2023
- End date: October 27, 2023
- Competitors: 11 from 11 nations

Medalists
Gold medal	Julio César La Cruz	Cuba
Silver medal	Keno Machado	Brazil
Bronze medal	Bryan Colwell	Canada
Bronze medal	Julio Castillo	Ecuador

The Men's 92 kg competition of the boxing events at the 2023 Pan American Games in Santiago, Chile, was held between October 20 and 27 at the Olympic Training Center. A total of 11 boxers from 11 NOC's competed.

The two finalists will qualify for the 2024 Summer Olympics in Paris, France.

== Qualification ==
There was a quota of 130 boxers to compete at the games (ten per event). The host nation (Chile) received automatic qualification spots for all events. The remainder of the spots were awarded through various qualifying tournaments. However, the International Olympic Committee later decided the competition was an open registration event, meaning any NOC could enter a boxer into the event.

== Competition format ==
Like all Pan American boxing events, the competition is a straight single-elimination tournament. Both semifinal losers are awarded bronze medals, so no boxers compete again after their first loss. Bouts consist of 3 rounds "10-point must" scoring system used, where the winner of each round must be awarded 10 points and the loser a lesser amount, and the elimination of the padded headgear. Five judges scored each bout. The winner will be the boxer who scored the most at the end of the match.

== Results ==
Round of 16 (October 20)
Jamar Talley (USA)	0
Julio César La Cruz (CUB)	5
Marlon Hurtado (COL)	5
Daniel Guzmán (DOM)	0
Yakita Aska (ANT)	4
Emmanuel Pompey (GUY)	1

Quarterfinals
Andrews Salgado (CHI)	0
Julio César La Cruz (CUB)	5
Julio Castillo (ECU)	5
Rogelio Romero (MEX)
Keno Machado (BRA)	5
Marlon Hurtado (COL)	0
Yakita Aska (ANT)	2
Bryan Colwell (CAN)	3

Semifinals
Julio César La Cruz (CUB)	4
Julio Castillo (ECU)	1
Keno Machado (BRA)	WO
Bryan Colwell (CAN)

Final
Julio César La Cruz (CUB)	4
Keno Machado (BRA)	1
