= Myriam Da Silva =

Canadian sprint boxer

Personal information
- Full name: Myriam Da Silva Rondeau
- Born: April 15, 1984 (age 42) Chambly, Quebec, Canada
- Height: 173 cm (5 ft 8 in)
- Weight: 69 kg (152 lb)

Sport
- Sport: Boxing
- Weight class: Welterweight
Medal record
Women's boxing welterweight
Representing Canada
Pan American Games
Silver medal – second place	2019 Lima	Welterweight

Myriam Da Silva (born April 15, 1984) is a Canadian boxer. Da Silva competes in the 69 kg (welterweight category).

== Career ==
Da Silva has competed at four editions of the AIBA Women's World Boxing Championships, finishing in the top 16 in 2012 and 2014, and then followed by a quarterfinals position in 2018 and again a top 16 in 2019.

In 2019, Da Silva competed at the 2019 Pan American Games in Lima, Peru. Da Silva won the silver medal after losing to Oshae Jones in the final.

In May 2021, Da Silva was named to Canada's 2020 Olympic team.
