= Boxing at the 2019 Pan American Games – Men's 81 kg =

Men's Light heavyweight at the 2019 Pan American Games
- Venue: Miguel Grau Coliseum
- Dates: July 27– August 1, 2019
- Competitors: 6 from 6 nations

Medalists
Gold medal	Julio César La Cruz	Cuba
Silver medal	Keno Machado	Brazil
Bronze medal	Nalek Korbaj	Venezuela
Bronze medal	Rogelio Romero	Mexico

The Men's light heavyweight competition of the boxing events at the 2019 Pan American Games in Lima, Peru, was held between the 27 of July and the 1 of August 2019 at the Miguel Grau Coliseum.

Like all Pan American boxing events, the competition is a straight single-elimination tournament. Both semifinal losers are awarded bronze medals, so no boxers compete again after their first loss. Bouts consist of a 3 rounds "10-point must" scoring system used in the pro game, where the winner of each round must be awarded 10 points and the loser a lesser amount, and the elimination of the padded headgear. Five judges scored each bout. The winner will be the boxer who scored the most at the end of the match.

== Results ==
=== Bracket ===
Quarterfinals; July 27, 2019		Semifinals; July 30, 2019		Finals; August 1, 2019
		Julio César La Cruz (CUB)	5
Nalek Korbaj (VEN)	RSC	Nalek Korbaj (VEN)	0
Luis Georges (DOM)				Julio César La Cruz (CUB)	5
Keno Machado (BRA)	5			Keno Machado (BRA)	0
Harley O'Reilly (CAN)	0	Keno Machado (BRA)	5
		Rogelio Romero (MEX)	0
