= Aidos Yerbossynuly =

Kazakhstani boxer (born 1991)

Aidos Yerbossynuly Айдос Ербосынулы
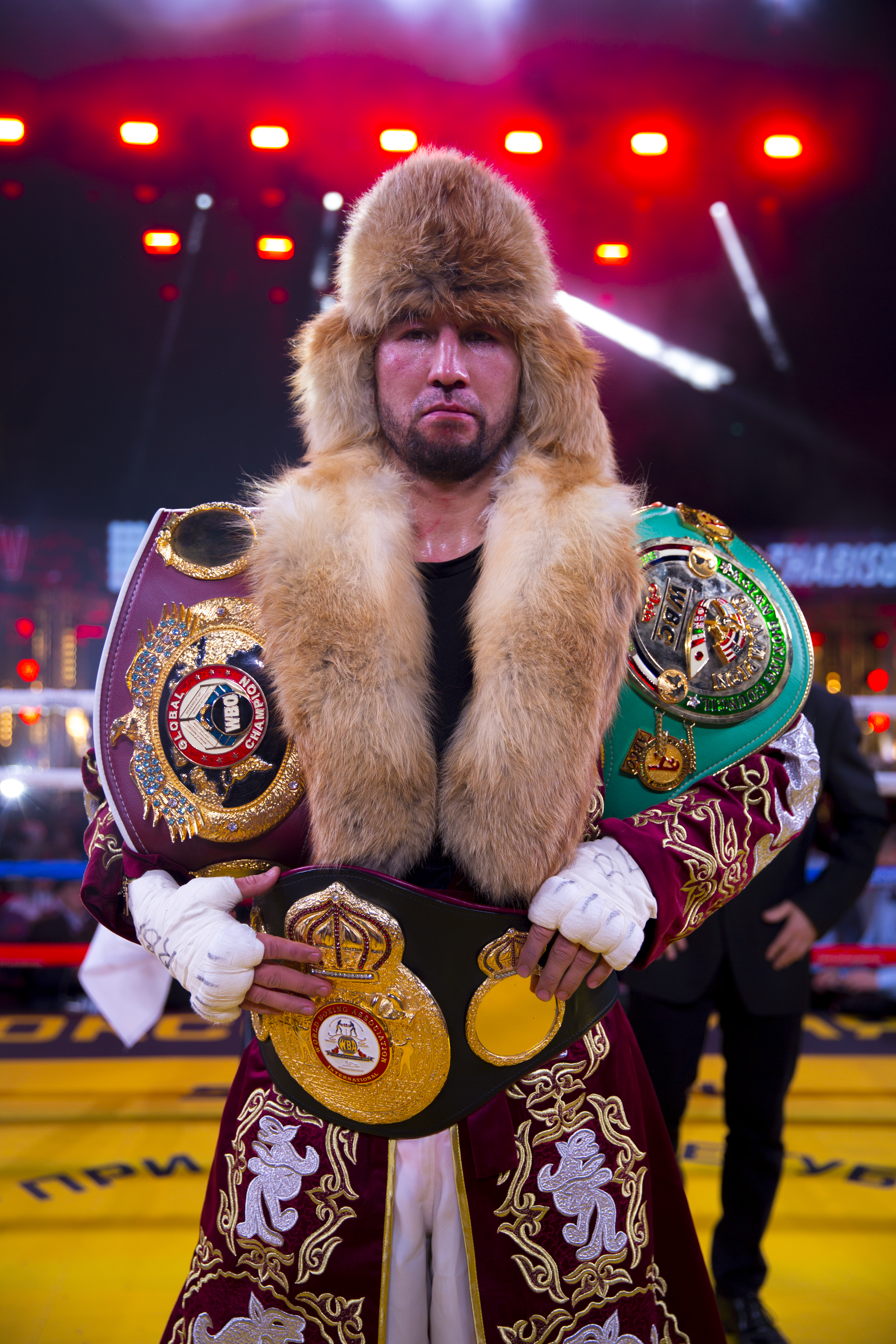

Personal information
- Born: 14 November 1991 (age 34) Zharkent, Almaty Region, Kazakhstan
- Height: 5 ft 11 1/2 in (182 cm)
- Weight: Super-middleweight

Boxing career
- Stance: Orthodox

Boxing record
- Total fights: 17
- Wins: 16
- Win by KO: 11
- Losses: 1

Aidos Yerbossynuly (Cyrillic: Айдос Ербосынулы; born 14 November 1991) is a Kazakhstani professional boxer.

== Professional career ==
Yerbossynuly made his professional debut on 2 October 2015, scoring a first-round technical knockout (TKO) victory over Sergei Dologzhiev at the Circus in Lviv, Ukraine.

After compiling a record of 8–0 (7 KOs), he defeated Aliaksandr Sushchyts on 15 September 2018 at the Konys in Aktobe, Kazakhstan, capturing the vacant WBC-ABC Continental super-middleweight title by unanimous decision (UD) with the scorecards reading 100–90, 100–91 and 99–91. He captured the vacant WBO Global super-middleweight title in his next fight, defeating Ilias Achergui by fourth-round corner retirement (RTD) on 23 December 2018 at the Soviet Wings Sport Palace in Moscow, Russia. Yerbossynuly retained his WBC and WBO regional titles via UD against Lukas Ndafoluma on 24 March 2019, while also capturing the vacant WBA International super-middleweight title at the Almaty Arena in Almaty, Kazakhstan. He successfully defended his regional titles twice more in 2019; a UD over Rocky Jerkic in August and an eighth-round TKO against Omar Garcia in December.

Yerbossynuly faced David Morrell for the WBA (Regular) super-middleweight title on 5 November 2022. Both fighters were undefeated at the time. After losing the bout by knockout in the 12th round, Yerbossynuly was hospitalized and put into an induced coma due to a subdural hematoma, bleeding on the brain. The doctors successfully reduced the swelling to his brain via surgery, and by November 17, Yerbossynuly had awoken from his coma. By December, Yerbossynuly had been released from the hospital and returned to Kazakhstan.

Despite the severe nature of his injury, Yerbossynuly indicated that he intended to return to the ring by 2024, though this has not yet come to pass as of 2025.

== Professional boxing record ==
17 fights	16 wins	1 loss
By knockout	11	1
By decision	5	0

No.	Result	Record	Opponent	Type	Round, time	Date	Location	Notes
17	Loss	16–1	David Morrell	KO	12 (12), 2:34	5 Nov 2022	Minneapolis Armory, Minneapolis, Minnesota, US	For WBA (Regular) super-middleweight title
16	Win	16–0	Lennox Allen	TKO	10 (12), 2:59	12 Sep 2021	Jekpe-Jek Arena, Nur-Sultan, Kazakhstan	
15	Win	15–0	Issah Samir	TKO	3 (12), 0:46	16 Dec 2020	Nur-Sultan, Kazakhstan	Retained WBA International, WBC-ABC, and WBO Global super-middleweight titles
14	Win	14–0	Nuhu Lawal	UD	10	26 Jul 2020	DiaMond, Minsk, Belarus	Retained WBA International, WBC-ABC, and WBO Global super-middleweight titles
13	Win	13–0	Omar Garcia	TKO	8 (10), 1:19	21 Dec 2019	Ivan Yarygin Sports Palace, Krasnoyarsk, Russia	Retained WBA International and WBO Global super-middleweight titles; Won vacant WBC-ABC super-middleweight title
12	Win	12–0	Rocky Jerkic	UD	10	14 Aug 2019	ICC Sydney, Sydney, Australia	Retained WBA International and WBC-ABC Continental super-middleweight titles
11	Win	11–0	Lukas Ndafoluma	UD	10	24 Mar 2019	Almaty Arena, Almaty, Kazakhstan	Retained WBC-ABC Continental and WBO Global super-middleweight titles; Won vacant WBA International super-middleweight title
10	Win	10–0	Ilius Achergui	RTD	4 (10), 3:00	23 Dec 2018	Soviet Wings Sport Palace, Moscow, Russia	Won vacant WBO Global super-middleweight title
9	Win	9–0	Aliaksandr Sushchyts	UD	10	15 Sep 2018	Konys, Aktobe, Kazakhstan	Won vacant WBC-ABC Continental super-middleweight title
8	Win	8–0	Ismat Eynullayev	RTD	1 (10), 3:00	7 Jul 2018	Barys Arena, Astana, Kazakhstan	
7	Win	7–0	Jonathan Geromino Barbadillo	TKO	1 (8), 2:34	9 Sep 2017	Saryarka Velodrome, Astana, Kazakhstan	
6	Win	6–0	Devin Butcher	UD	6	17 Jun 2017	Du Burns Arena, Baltimore, Maryland, US	
5	Win	5–0	Riarus Dudley	TKO	2 (6), 0:39	23 Mar 2017	The Skylands, Randolph, New Jersey, US	
4	Win	4–0	Lasha Gurguliani	TKO	5 (6), 2:26	14 May 2016	Korme Exhibition Centre, Astana, Kazakhstan	
3	Win	3–0	Dmitriy Antipov	KO	1 (6), 1:56	30 Jan 2016	Royal Tulip Hotel, Almaty, Kazakhstan	
2	Win	2–0	Denys Pidnebesnyy	TKO	4 (6), 1:47	31 Oct 2015	Circus, Kryvyi Rih, Ukraine	
1	Win	1–0	Andrei Dologzhiev	TKO	1 (6), 1:13	2 Oct 2015	Circus, Lviv, Ukraine	

Sporting positions
Regional boxing titles
Vacant Title last held by Sakio Bika	WBC-ABC super-middleweight champion 15 September 2018 – present	Incumbent
Vacant Title last held by Fedor Chudinov	WBA International super-middleweight champion 24 March 2019 – present	Incumbent
Minor world boxing titles
Inaugural champion	WBO Global super-middleweight champion 23 December 2018 – present	Incumbent
