= 2023 IBA World Boxing Championships – Cruiserweight =

Cruiserweight at the 2023 IBA World Boxing Championships
- Venue: Humo Arena
- Location: Tashkent, Uzbekistan
- Dates: 2–14 May
- Competitors: 30 from 30 nations

Medalists
gold medal	Sharabutdin Ataev	Russia
silver medal	Loren Alfonso	Azerbaijan
bronze medal	Georgii Kushitashvili	Georgia
bronze medal	Rogelio Romero	Mexico

The Cruiserweight competition at the 2023 IBA Men's World Boxing Championships was held between 2 and 14 May 2023.

== Results ==
=== Finals ===
Semifinals
(Azerbaijan) Loren Alfonso	5
(Georgia (country)) Georgii Kushitashvili	0
(Russia) Sharabutdin Ataev	5
(Mexico) Rogelio Romero	0

Final
(Azerbaijan) Loren Alfonso	1
(Russia) Sharabutdin Ataev	4

=== Top half ===
==== Section 1 ====
Round of 32
(India) Harsh Choudhary	0
(Australia) Billy McAllister	5
(Kazakhstan) Sagyndyk Togambay	RSC
(Democratic Republic of the Congo) Nathan Mbeli
(Uzbekistan) Shokhjakhon Abdullaev	5
(Kyrgyzstan) Erkin Adylbek Uulu	0

Round of 16
(Azerbaijan) Loren Alfonso	5
(Australia) Billy McAllister	0
(Kazakhstan) Sagyndyk Togambay	0
(Uzbekistan) Shokhjakhon Abdullaev	5

Quarterfinals
(Azerbaijan) Loren Alfonso	5
(Uzbekistan) Shokhjakhon Abdullaev	2

==== Section 2 ====
Round of 32
(Georgia (country)) Georgii Kushitashvili	5
(Spain) Andy Tamayo	0
(Trinidad and Tobago) Jeremiah Thomas	0
(Angola) Adriano Kiana	5
(Turkey) Hakan Koç	RSC
(Haiti) David Sauveur
(Israel) Yan Zak	1
(Armenia) Rafayel Hovhannisyan	4

Round of 16
(Georgia (country)) Georgii Kushitashvili	5
(Angola) Adriano Kiana	0
(Turkey) Hakan Koç
(Armenia) Rafayel Hovhannisyan	RSC

Quarterfinals
(Georgia (country)) Georgii Kushitashvili	5
(Armenia) Rafayel Hovhannisyan	0

=== Bottom half ===
==== Section 3 ====
Round of 32
(Russia) Sharabutdin Ataev	4
(Serbia) Milosav Savić	0
(Kenya) Hezron Maganga	5
(French Polynesia) Henere Tetoofa	0
(Paraguay) Isidro Ranoni	0
(France) Gaëtan Ntambwe	5
(Montenegro) Petar Liješević	0
(Jordan) Odai Al-Hindawi	5

Round of 16
(Russia) Sharabutdin Ataev	RSC
(Kenya) Hezron Maganga
(France) Gaëtan Ntambwe	0
(Jordan) Odai Al-Hindawi	5

Quarterfinals
(Russia) Sharabutdin Ataev	5
(Jordan) Odai Al-Hindawi	0

==== Section 4 ====
Round of 32
(Mozambique) Albino Gabriel	5
(Turkmenistan) Taganmyrat Gurbanow	0
(Cuba) Nelson Williams	5
(Dominican Republic) Daniel Guzmán	0
(Iran) Amin Majnouni	0
(Tajikistan) Parviz Karimov	5

Round of 16
(Mozambique) Albino Gabriel	0
(Cuba) Nelson Williams	5
(Tajikistan) Parviz Karimov	0
(Mexico) Rogelio Romero	5

Quarterfinals
(Cuba) Nelson Williams	0
(Mexico) Rogelio Romero	5
