= Isaías Ribeiro =

Brazilian boxer (born 2002)

Personal information
- Full name: Isaías Santos Ribeiro Filho
- Nickname: Samurai
- National team: Brazil
- Born: 17 March 2002 (age 24) Salvador, Bahia, Brazil

Sport
- Country: Brazil
- Sport: Boxing
Medal record
Men's amateur boxing
Representing Brazil
World Championships
Silver medal – second place	2025 Liverpool	90 kg

Isaías Santos Ribeiro Filho (born 17 March 2002) is a Brazilian boxer. His nickname is "Samurai".

== Career ==
At the 2021 AIBA Youth World Boxing Championships, he even won a medal for Brazil by defeating Ukrainian Illia Tohobytskyi in the quarterfinals. He won by a 3-2 decision and qualified for the semifinals. But the European country appealed the result, and it was upheld by the International Amateur Boxing Association (Aiba), which eliminated the Brazilian.

At the adult 2021 AIBA World Boxing Championships, held in Belgrade, Serbia, in October 2021, he fell in the opening round of the competition.

In 2024, he was already a four-time Brazilian boxing champion in the 92 kg category.

At the 2025 World Boxing Championships, he won three fights, reaching the semi-finals and securing a medal. He also defeated Olympic medalist Loren Alfonso in the semifinals, and finished the competition with the silver medal.
