= 2025 IBA World Boxing Championships – Cruiserweight =

Cruiserweight at the 2025 IBA World Boxing Championships
- Venue: Dubai Duty Free Tennis Stadium
- Location: Dubai, United Arab Emirates
- Dates: 5–13 December
- Competitors: 27

Medalists
gold medal	Sharabutdin Ataev	Russia
silver medal	Aliaksei Alfiorau	Belarus
bronze medal	Georgii Kushitashvili	Georgia
bronze medal	Rafayel Hovhannisyan	Armenia

The Cruiserweight competition at the 2025 IBA Men's World Boxing Championships was held from 5 to 13 December 2025.

== Results ==
=== Finals ===
Semifinals
(Russia) Sharabutdin Ataev	5
(Georgia (country)) Georgii Kushitashvili	0
(Armenia) Rafayel Hovhannisyan
(Belarus) Aliaksei Alfiorau	KO

Final
(Russia) Sharabutdin Ataev	5
(Belarus) Aliaksei Alfiorau	0

=== Top half ===
==== Section 1 ====
Round of 32
(Kenya) Chrispine Hongo	0
(Moldova) Andrei Chiriacov	5
(Scotland) Robert McNulty	0
(Uzbekistan) Akmaljon Isroilov	5
(Kazakhstan) Daulet Tulemissov	5
(Brazil) Ramon Batagello	0

Round of 16
(Russia) Sharabutdin Ataev	5
(Moldova) Andrei Chiriacov	0
(Uzbekistan) Akmaljon Isroilov	5
(Kazakhstan) Daulet Tulemissov	0

Quarterfinals
(Russia) Sharabutdin Ataev	5
(Uzbekistan) Akmaljon Isroilov	0

==== Section 2 ====
Round of 32
(Angola) Adriano Kiana	KO
(India) Harpal Singh
(French Polynesia) Iriatai Raiheui	0
(Kyrgyzstan) Erkin Adylbek Uulu	5

Round of 16
(Comoros) Nassur Ali	1
(Angola) Adriano Kiana	4
(Kyrgyzstan) Erkin Adylbek Uulu
(Georgia (country)) Georgii Kushitashvili	RSC-H

Quarterfinals
(Angola) Adriano Kiana	0
(Georgia (country)) Georgii Kushitashvili	5

=== Bottom half ===
==== Section 3 ====
Round of 32
(Israel) Yan Zak	5
(Portugal) António Rodrigues	0
(Ecuador) Marlo Delgado	5
(Turkey) Birol Aygün	0

Round of 16
(Armenia) Rafayel Hovhannisyan	5
(Israel) Yan Zak	0
(Ecuador) Marlo Delgado	5
(Cameroon) Guillaume Yebi	0

Quarterfinals
(Armenia) Rafayel Hovhannisyan	4
(Ecuador) Marlo Delgado	1

==== Section 4 ====
Round of 32
(Spain) Adrián Fresneda	RSC
(Cape Verde) Israel Nzewi
(Tajikistan) Parviz Karimov	5
(Niger) Abdoul Kader Kimba Issaka	0

Round of 16
(Democratic Republic of the Congo) Peter Pita	4
(Spain) Adrián Fresneda	3
(Tajikistan) Parviz Karimov	0
(Belarus) Aliaksei Alfiorau	5

Quarterfinals
(Democratic Republic of the Congo) Peter Pita	0
(Belarus) Aliaksei Alfiorau	5
