= Bekzad Nurdauletov =

Kazakhstani boxer (born 1998)

Bekzad Nurdauletov Бекзад Жалгасбаевич Нурдаулетов
Personal information
- Nationality: Kazakh
- Born: 10 April 1998 (age 28) Zhanaozen, Kazakhstan
- Height: 1.88 m (6 ft 2 in)
- Weight: Light heavyweight

Boxing career
- Stance: Orthodox

Boxing record
- Total fights: 4
- Wins: 4
- Win by KO: 2
- Losses: 0
Medal record
Men's amateur boxing
Representing Kazakhstan
World Championships
Gold medal – first place	2019 Yekaterinburg	Light heavyweight
Asian Championships
Gold medal – first place	2024 Chiang Mai	Cruiserweight
Junior World Championships
Bronze medal – third place	2016 St. Petersburg	Light heavyweight

Bekzad Nurdauletov (Бекзад Нурдаулетов, born 10 April 1998) is a Kazakhstani professional boxer. As an amateur, he won the gold medal at the 2019 AIBA World Boxing Championships.

== Amateur boxing career ==
Nurdauletov competed in the light heavyweight category of the 2019 AIBA World Boxing Championships, which took place between 9 and 21 September 2019. He won the gold medal, most notably beating Julio César La Cruz by decision in the semifinals and Dilshodbek Ruzmetov by decision in the finals.

Nurdauletov took part in the 2020 Olympic Qualifying Tournament for the Asia and Oceania regions, which took place at the Prince Hamza Hall in Amman, in March 2020. He earned his place at the 2020 Summer Olympics by beating Shabbos Negmatulloev by unanimous decision in the quarterfinals, Odai Al Hindawi by unanimous decision in the semifinals and Paulo Aokuso by unanimous decision in the finals.

Eight months later, in November 2020, Nurdauletov participated in the Kazakhstan national boxing tournament. He beat Amandyk Manashev in the quarterfinals, Bekbolat Abdikerim in the semifinals and Nurbek Oralbay in the finals in the same manner - by unanimous decision. It was the first national boxing title of his amateur career.

Nurdauletov competed in one more major amateur tournament before the Summer Olympics, the 2021 Governors Cup, which took place in Saint Petersburg in April 2021. He beat his final three opponents (Dilshodbek Ruzmetov, Andrey Kosenkov and Imam Khataev) by unanimous decision. He would face Imam Khataev in the round of 16 of the Summer Olympics three months later, and suffered an upset split decision loss.

== Professional boxing career ==
Nurdauletov made his professional debut against Ibrahim Maokola on 31 October 2021. He won the fight by a second-round technical knockout. Nurdauletov was next scheduled to face Kabiru Towolawi on 16 December 2020. He won the fight by unanimous decision, with all three judges scoring the fight 60–54 in his favor. Nurdauletov faced Farrukh Juraev in his third professional appearance on 6 November 2021. He won the fight by unanimous decision, with scores of 80–70, 80–71 and 80–71.

Nurdauletov was booked to face the undefeated Chico Kwasi for the vacant WBO Youth light heavyweight title on 5 February 2022. He captured his first professional title by a ninth-round technical knockout.

== Professional boxing record ==
4 fights	4 wins	0 losses
By knockout	2	0
By decision	2	0

No.	Result	Record	Opponent	Type	Round, time	Date	Location	Notes
4	Win	4–0	(Netherlands) Chico Kwasi	TKO	9 (10), 1:00	5 Feb 2022	Rixos Water World Aktau, Aktau, Kazakhstan	Won vacant WBO Youth light heavyweight title
3	Win	3–0	(Uzbekistan) Farrukh Juraev	UD	8	6 Nov 2021	Halyk Arena Sport Complex, Aktau, Kazakhstan	
2	Win	2–0	(Nigeria) Kabiru Towolawi	UD	6	16 Dec 2020	Jekpe-Jek Arena, Nur-Sultan, Kazakhstan	
1	Win	1–0	(Tanzania) Ibrahim Maokola	TKO	2 (6), 2:27	31 Oct 2020	Atyrau, Kazakhstan	
