= Farrukh Kilichev =

Uzbekistani boxing trainer (born 1985)

Farukh Kilichev
Personal information
- Born: 15 September 1985 (age 40) Jizzakh, Uzbekistan
- Height: 190 cm (6 ft 3 in)
- Weight: Middleweight, Light heavyweight

Boxing career

Farrukh Kilichev (ру: Киличев, Фаррух Комилович, uzb: Farruh Qilichev: born September 15, 1985), is an Uzbekistani former amateur boxer and currently boxing trainer of the Uzbekistan National Team, who trains Dilshodbek Ruzmetov, olympic gold medalist Bakhodir Jalolov, and youth Olympic medalist Jakhongir Rakhmonov.

== Biography ==
Farrukh was born on September 15, 1985, in Jizzakh, Uzbekistan. Since 1995, he started boxing in Jizzakh, from 2005 competed in the Middleweight, light heavyweight category, multiple champion of Uzbekistan. He graduated from Uzbek State University of Physical Culture and Sport in 2008 year.

From 2000 until 2011, he competed in light heavyweight and in heavyweight categories as an amateur boxer.

In 2009, he won the Misra International Tournament (Chandigarh, India)

Silver medalist of International Tournament - Ufa, Russia - December 2–6, 2008

Bronze medalist of Shokyr Boltekuly Memorial Tournament - Aktau, Kazakhstan - October 26–30, 2011

In 2011, due to injury he finished his fighter career and started his career as a boxing coach.

Since 2011, he has been engaged in boxing coaching at the Chirchik College of the Olympic Reserve (since 2018 Chirchik Specialized boarding school of the Olympic Reserve). In 2016, he became the senior boxing coach.

== Awards ==
He was awarded in 2019 after IBA World Championships with the medal of Shukhrat (Medal of Glory) and in 2021 after Tokyo Olympic games with the Honored Coach of the Republic of Uzbekistan by the President of the Republic of Uzbekistan

== Personal life ==
Kilichev is married and has three children.
