= David Morrell (boxer) =

Cuban boxer (born 1998)

David Morrell Jr.
Personal information
- Born: Osvary David Morrell Gutierrez; Jr. January 18, 1998 (age 28) Santa Clara, Cuba
- Height: 6 ft 1 in (185 cm)
- Weight: Super-middleweight; Light-heavyweight

Boxing career
- Reach: 77 in (196 cm)
- Stance: Southpaw

Boxing record
- Total fights: 15
- Wins: 13
- Win by KO: 10
- Losses: 2
Medal record
Men's Amateur boxing
Representing Cuba
Youth World Championships
| Gold medal – first place | 2016 St. Petersburg | Light heavyweight |
Representing Camagüey
Cuban National Championships
| Gold medal – first place | 2017 Havana | Light heavyweight |

Osvary David Morrell Gutierrez Jr. (born January 18, 1998) is a Cuban professional boxer. He held the World Boxing Association (Regular version) light-heavyweight title from 2024 to 2025 and previously the WBA (Regular version) super-middleweight title from 2021 to 2024. As an amateur, he won gold medals at the 2016 Youth World Championships and the 2017 Cuban National Championships.

== Amateur career ==
During an amateur career in which Morrell compiled a record of 130–5, he won gold medals at the 2016 Youth World Championships—where he was named "Best Boxer of the Tournament"—the 2017 Cuban National Championships, and the 2018 India Open International Boxing Tournament.

== Professional career ==
Morrell made his professional debut on August 28, 2019, scoring a first-round knockout (KO) victory over Yendris Rodriguez Valdez at the Minneapolis Armory in Minneapolis, Minnesota.

He scored a second-round KO victory against Quinton Rankin in November before facing Lennox Allen for the vacant WBA interim super middleweight title on August 8, 2020, at the Microsoft Theater in Los Angeles, California. The bout featured on the undercard of the interim welterweight title fight between Thomas Dulorme and Jamal James. The event was originally scheduled to take place on April 11 but was postponed due to the COVID-19 pandemic. In what was described as a dominant performance, Morrell captured the WBA interim title via twelve-round unanimous decision (UD) with the judges' scorecards reading 120–108, 119–109, and 118–110.

He was set to make the first defense of his title against Mike Gavronski on December 26 at the Shine Exposition Hall in Los Angeles. After Morrell failed to weigh within the super middleweight limit, reports claimed that he had been stripped of his title. However, it was later revealed that a clause in the fight contract allowed for the fight to continue as a non-title contest. Morrell defeated Gavronski via third-round KO.

The following month, Morrell was elevated from interim champion to Regular champion. The first defense of his Regular title came against Mario Cazares on June 27, 2021, at the Minneapolis Armory. Morrell Retained his title via first-round KO.

After defending his title on November 5, 2022, against Aidos Yerbossynuly, knocking him out in the 12th round, Yerbossynuly was hospitalized and put into an induced coma due to a subdural hematoma.

=== Morrell vs. Kalajdzic ===
Morrell was scheduled to face Radivoje Kalajdzic at BMO Stadium in Los Angeles on August 3, 2024. Morrell defeated Kalajdzic by unanimous decision and won the vacant WBA "Regular" light heavyweight title.

=== Morrell vs. Benavidez ===
On October 8, 2024, it was announced that Morrell would face David Benavidez, who at that time held the WBC interim light heavyweight title. On February 1, 2025, the two met at the T-Mobile Arena in Nevada, engaging in a highly competitive fight that saw both fighters throwing at a high volume. While Benavidez controlled most of the fight, Morrell scored a flash knockdown over Benavidez towards the end of the 11th, the second of Benavidez's career. However, following a furious exchange at the end of the round, Morrell threw a shot after the bell that connected on Benavidez, which prompted Thomas Taylor to deduct a point from Morrell. After a similarly high-paced 12th round, Morrell lost via a unanimous decision, losing by scores of 118–108 and 115–111 twice, with Benavidez taking his WBA title in the process. CompuBox stats revealed that Morrell and Benavidez threw 601 and 553 punches respectively, yet Benavidez out-landed Morrell 224 to 165, connecting at a more accurate rate of 40.5% compared to Morrell's 27.5%. This was the first loss of Morrell's career.

=== Morrell vs. Khataev ===
On July 12, 2025, Morrell faced unbeaten prospect Imam Khataev, who was coming into the bout 10–0 with 9 KOs. On July 8, the International Testing Agency, under the auspicies of the IBA, revealed that Khataev had tested positive for clomifene in April of that year, handing Khataev a two-year suspension. Despite this, Morrell insisted on pursuing the bout as scheduled, and given the IBA's apparently limited jurisdiction, the bout was allowed to continue.

Despite suffering the first knockdown of his career in the fifth round, Morrell bounced back in the second half of the fight and won a controversial 10-round split decision, handing Khataev his first defeat.

=== Morrell vs. Smith ===
Morrell was scheduled to challenge Callum Smith for his interim WBO light heavyweight title at the M&S Bank Arena in Liverpool, England, on April 18, 2026. On April 6, 2026, it was announced the fight had been cancelled after Smith suffered an injury during training camp.

=== Morrell vs. Chelli ===
Morrell faced Zak Chelli at Co-op Live in Manchester, England, on May 9, 2026. In a massive upset, he lost by technical knockout in the tenth and final round, despite having controlled most of the fight beforehand.

== Professional boxing record ==
| 15 fights | 13 wins | 2 losses |
|---|---|---|
| By knockout | 10 | 1 |
| By decision | 3 | 1 |

| No. | Result | Record | Opponent | Type | Round, time | Date | Location | Notes |
|---|---|---|---|---|---|---|---|---|
| 15 | Win | 13–2 | Julio De Jesus Rodriguez | TKO | 1 (10) | Nov 21, 2026 | Coliseo Carlos 'Teo' Cruz, Santo Domingo, Dominican Republic | |
| 14 | Loss | 12–2 | Zak Chelli | TKO | 10 (10), 2:24 | May 9, 2026 | Co-op Live Arena, Manchester, England | |
| 13 | Win | 12–1 | Imam Khataev | SD | 10 | Jul 12, 2025 | Louis Armstrong Stadium, New York City, New York, U.S. | |
| 12 | Loss | 11–1 | David Benavidez | UD | 12 | Feb 1, 2025 | T-Mobile Arena, Paradise, Nevada, U.S. | Lost WBA (Regular) light-heavyweight title; For WBC interim light-heavyweight title |
| 11 | Win | 11–0 | Radivoje Kalajdzic | UD | 12 | Aug 3, 2024 | BMO Stadium, Los Angeles, California, U.S. | Won vacant WBA (Regular) light-heavyweight title |
| 10 | Win | 10–0 | Sena Agbeko | TKO | 2 (12), 1:43 | Dec 16, 2023 | Minneapolis Armory, Minneapolis, Minnesota, U.S. | Retained WBA (Regular) super-middleweight title |
| 9 | Win | 9–0 | Yamaguchi Falcão | KO | 1 (12), 2:22 | Apr 22, 2023 | T-Mobile Arena, Paradise, Nevada, U.S. | Retained WBA (Regular) super-middleweight title |
| 8 | Win | 8–0 | Aidos Yerbossynuly | KO | 12 (12) 2:34 | Nov 5, 2022 | Minneapolis Armory, Minneapolis, Minnesota, U.S. | Retained WBA (Regular) super-middleweight title |
| 7 | Win | 7–0 | Kalvin Henderson | TKO | 4 (12), 2:35 | Jun 4, 2022 | Minneapolis Armory, Minneapolis, Minnesota, U.S. | Retained WBA (Regular) super-middleweight title |
| 6 | Win | 6–0 | Alantez Fox | TKO | 4 (12), 2:06 | Dec 18, 2021 | Minneapolis Armory, Minneapolis, Minnesota, U.S. | Retained WBA (Regular) super-middleweight title |
| 5 | Win | 5–0 | Mario Abel Cazares | KO | 1 (12), 2:32 | Jun 27, 2021 | Minneapolis Armory, Minneapolis, Minnesota, U.S. | Retained WBA (Regular) super-middleweight title |
| 4 | Win | 4–0 | Mike Gavronski | KO | 3 (10), 2:45 | Dec 26, 2020 | Shrine Auditorium, Los Angeles, California, U.S. | |
| 3 | Win | 3–0 | Lennox Allen | UD | 12 | Aug 8, 2020 | Microsoft Theater, Los Angeles, California, U.S. | Won vacant WBA interim super-middleweight title |
| 2 | Win | 2–0 | Quinton Rankin | KO | 2 (8), 1:01 | Nov 2, 2019 | MGM National Harbor, Oxon Hill, Maryland, U.S. | |
| 1 | Win | 1–0 | Yendris Rodriguez Valdez | KO | 1 (4), 1:05 | Aug 31, 2019 | Minneapolis Armory, Minneapolis, Minnesota, U.S. | |

== See also ==
- List of male boxers
- List of southpaw stance boxers
- List of world super-middleweight boxing champions
- List of world light-heavyweight boxing champions

Sporting positions
World boxing titles
| Vacant Title last held by John Ryder | WBA super-middleweight champion Interim title August 8, 2020 – January 19, 2021 promoted to Regular champion | Vacant Title next held by Caleb Plant |
| Vacant Title last held by Canelo Álvarez | WBA super-middleweight champion Regular title January 19, 2021 – August 30, 2024; Vacated | Title discontinued |
| Vacant Title last held by Jean Pascal | WBA light-heavyweight champion Regular title August 3, 2024 – February 1, 2025 | Succeeded by David Benavidez |
