= SugarHill Steward =

American boxing trainer

Personal information
- Nickname: Sugar
- Nationality: United States
- Born: Javan Hill; 1975 (age 50–51) Detroit, Michigan, U.S.
- Occupation: Boxing trainer

SugarHill Steward (formerly known as Javan "Sugar" Hill) is an American professional boxing trainer, best known as the trainer of Tyson Fury.

He changed his name in 2019 to honor his uncle, boxing trainer Emanuel Steward, explaining that he was like a father to him.

== Career ==
=== Kronk Gym ===
Steward worked at his uncle's Kronk Gym, where he first met Tyson Fury in 2010. After Emanuel Steward died in 2012, SugarHill worked with some of his uncle's former fighters, including Adonis Stevenson, Anthony Dirrell and Charles Martin.

=== Tyson Fury ===
After Fury parted ways with former trainer Ben Davison in December 2019, Steward was appointed as Fury's head trainer, despite having been in conversations with Fury to join the team in a different role. At the time, Steward's existing clients were less prominent fighters such as Shohjahon Ergashev and Apti Davtaev.

After Fury's victory in a rematch against Deontay Wilder in February 2020, Steward paid tribute to his uncle, saying: "Emanuel Steward is smiling down from heaven. He knew Tyson Fury would become a champion way back then."

In September 2020, Steward arrived in the U.K. to prepare Fury for a planned trilogy fight with Deontay Wilder, despite hinting he would retire as a professional trainer after the second Wilder fight.

Following on from Fury's knockout win over Wilder in the second fight, Fury retained Steward as his head coach for a trilogy fight between the two heavyweights. The trilogy fight ended in a knockout win for Tyson Fury culminating in the end of a three-year rivalry and resulting in Steward getting his first heavyweight title defense as a head coach.

=== Benjamin Whittaker ===
In 2022 SugarHill Steward became Benjamin Whittaker's trainer, as Whittaker had signed a professional deal with Boxxer.
