= 2026 European Boxing Championships – Men's 90 kg =

Men's 90 kg at the 2026 European Boxing Championships
- Venue: Asics Arena
- Location: Sofia, Bulgaria
- Dates: 17–25 September
- Competitors: 20 from 20 nations

Medalists
gold medal	Emrah Yaşar	Turkey
silver medal	Enmanuel Reyes	Spain
bronze medal	Georgii Kushitashvili	Georgia
bronze medal	Kevin Lebowski	Germany

The men's 90 kg competition at the 2026 European Boxing Championships was held from 17 to 25 September 2026.

== Results ==
=== Final ===
Final; 25 September
(Spain) Enmanuel Reyes	0
(Turkey) Emrah Yaşar	5

=== Top half ===
Round of 32; 17 September
(Russia) Ramazan Dadaev	4
(Italy) Dean Nwokedi Chime	0
Aryan Saed Panah	4
(Croatia) Petar Leskur	1

Round of 16; 20 September
(Spain) Enmanuel Reyes	3
(Russia) Ramazan Dadaev	2
(Slovakia) Joseph Kostúr
(Bulgaria) Roselin Bachevski	w/o
(France) Soheb Bouafia	0
(Georgia (country)) Georgii Kushitashvili	5
Aryan Saed Panah	2
(Republic of Ireland) Jack Marley	3

Quarterfinals; 22 September
(Spain) Enmanuel Reyes	5
(Bulgaria) Roselin Bachevski	0
(Georgia (country)) Georgii Kushitashvili	4
(Republic of Ireland) Jack Marley	1

Semifinals; 23 September
(Spain) Enmanuel Reyes	3
(Georgia (country)) Georgii Kushitashvili	2

=== Bottom half ===
Round of 32; 17 September
(Armenia) Narek Manasyan	5
(Hungary) Levente Kiss	0
(Ukraine) Bogdan Tolmachov	0
(Poland) Alexey Sevostyanov	5

Round of 16; 20 September
(Turkey) Emrah Yaşar	5
(Armenia) Narek Manasyan	0
(North Macedonia) Ilcho Kostovski	0
(Moldova) Andrei Zaplitnîi	5
(Azerbaijan) Rauf Rahimov	1
(Germany) Kevin Lebowski	4
(Poland) Alexey Sevostyanov	0
(England) Isaac Okoh	5

Quarterfinals; 22 September
(Turkey) Emrah Yaşar	5
(Moldova) Andrei Zaplitnîi	0
(Germany) Kevin Lebowski	3
(England) Isaac Okoh	0

Semifinals; 23 September
(Turkey) Emrah Yaşar	5
(Germany) Kevin Lebowski	0
