= 2025 World Boxing Championships – Men's 90 kg =

Competition at amateur boxing tournament

Men's 90 kg at the 2025 World Boxing Championships
- Venue: Liverpool Arena
- Location: Liverpool, England
- Dates: 4–14 September
- Competitors: 25 from 25 nations

Medalists
gold medal	Turabek Khabibullaev	Uzbekistan
silver medal	Isaías Ribeiro	Brazil
bronze medal	Loren Alfonso	Azerbaijan
bronze medal	Enmanuel Reyes	Spain

The Men's 90 kg competition at the 2025 World Boxing Championships was held from 4 to 14 September 2025.

== Results ==
=== Final ===
Final; 14 September
Isaías Ribeiro (BRA)	0
Turabek Khabibullaev (UZB)	5

=== Top half ===
Preliminaries; 4 September
Yasse Cisse (GER)	3
Jonas Jazevičius (LTU)	2
Emrah Yaşar (TUR)	4
Nelson Williams (CUB)	1
Xie Lifeng (CHN)	RSC
Jesús Talamantes (MEX)
Malachi Georges (USA)	5
Stiven Aas (EST)	0
Bogdan Tolmachov (UKR)	0
Soheb Bouafia (FRA)	5

Round of 16; 8 September
Loren Alfonso (AZE)	5
Yasse Cisse (GER)	0
Emrah Yaşar (TUR)	5
Xie Lifeng (CHN)	0
Levente Kiss (HUN)
Malachi Georges (USA)	KO
Soheb Bouafia (FRA)	0
Isaías Ribeiro (BRA)	5

Quarter-finals; 10 September
Loren Alfonso (AZE)	3
Emrah Yaşar (TUR)	2
Malachi Georges (USA)	0
Isaías Ribeiro (BRA)	5

Semi-finals; 12 September
Loren Alfonso (AZE)	2
Isaías Ribeiro (BRA)	3

=== Bottom half ===
Preliminaries; 4 September
Sagyndyk Togambay (KAZ)	3
Isaac Okoh (ENG)	2
Vagkan Nanitzanian (GRE)	5
Jung Han-eul (KOR)	0
Harsh Choudhary (IND)
Adam Tutak (POL)	RSC
Zvonimir Rebolj (CRO)	4
Giorgi Tchigladze (GEO)	1

Round of 16; 8 September
Jack Marley (IRL)	1
Sagyndyk Togambay (KAZ)	4
Vagkan Nanitzanian (GRE)	0
Turabek Khabibullaev (UZB)	5
Amirreza Malekkhatabi (IRI)	0
Adam Tutak (POL)	5
Zvonimir Rebolj (CRO)	0
Enmanuel Reyes (ESP)	5

Quarter-finals; 10 September
Sagyndyk Togambay (KAZ)	0
Turabek Khabibullaev (UZB)	5
Adam Tutak (POL)	0
Enmanuel Reyes (ESP)	5

Semi-finals; 12 September
Turabek Khabibullaev (UZB)	4
Enmanuel Reyes (ESP)	1
