= 2025 IBA World Boxing Championships – Heavyweight =

Heavyweight at the 2025 IBA World Boxing Championships
- Venue: Dubai Duty Free Tennis Stadium
- Location: Dubai, United Arab Emirates
- Dates: 4–13 December
- Competitors: 27

Medalists
gold medal	Muslim Gadzhimagomedov	Russia
silver medal	Turabek Khabibullaev	Uzbekistan
bronze medal	Loren Alfonso	Azerbaijan
bronze medal	Enmanuel Reyes	Spain

The Heavyweight competition at the 2025 IBA Men's World Boxing Championships was held from 4 to 13 December 2025.

== Results ==
=== Finals ===
Semifinals
(Azerbaijan) Loren Alfonso	0
(Uzbekistan) Turabek Khabibullaev	5
(Spain) Enmanuel Reyes	0
(Russia) Muslim Gadzhimagomedov	5

Final
(Uzbekistan) Turabek Khabibullaev	0
(Russia) Muslim Gadzhimagomedov	5

=== Top half ===
==== Section 1 ====
Round of 32
(India) Akash Kachari	0
(Argentina) Matías Verón	5
(Kyrgyzstan) Bakyt Toktosun Uulu	4
(Kenya) Peter Abuti Alwanga	1
(Moldova) Andrei Zaplitni	WO
(Poland) Aleksey Sevastyanov

Round of 16
(Azerbaijan) Loren Alfonso	KO
(Argentina) Matías Verón
(Kyrgyzstan) Bakyt Toktosun Uulu
(Moldova) Andrei Zaplitni	KO

Quarterfinals
(Azerbaijan) Loren Alfonso	5
(Moldova) Andrei Zaplitni	0

==== Section 2 ====
Round of 32
(Brazil) Kalil Paiva	4
(Georgia (country)) Giorgi Tchigladze	1
(Senegal) Karamba Kebe	5
(Cameroon) Andre Tiodah Tchoupa	0

Round of 16
(Uzbekistan) Turabek Khabibullaev	RSC-I
(Brazil) Kalil Paiva
(Senegal) Karamba Kebe	0
(Cuba) Julio César La Cruz	5

Quarterfinals
(Uzbekistan) Turabek Khabibullaev	4
(Cuba) Julio César La Cruz	1

=== Bottom half ===
==== Section 3 ====
Round of 32
(Kazakhstan) Nurmagamed Yussupov	KO
(Tajikistan) Navruz Jafoev
(Zimbabwe) Mzobanzi Moyo
(Australia) Leo Nicolson	KO
(Cook Islands) Michael Schuster
(Armenia) Narek Manasyan	WO

Round of 16
(Spain) Enmanuel Reyes	4
(Kazakhstan) Nurmagamed Yussupov	1
(Australia) Leo Nicolson
(Armenia) Narek Manasyan	RSC

Quarterfinals
(Spain) Enmanuel Reyes	5
(Armenia) Narek Manasyan	2

==== Section 4 ====
Round of 32
(Greece) Vagkan Nanitzanian	5
(Germany) Daniel Lokstein	0
(Lebanon) Abdullah Antonio Bou
(Tonga) Unaloto Havea	RSC
(Cambodia) Abdulla Rajapov	WO
(Gabon) Njinnou Mouandat Simphorien

Round of 16
(Greece) Vagkan Nanitzanian	RSC
(Tonga) Unaloto Havea
(Cambodia) Abdulla Rajapov	0
(Russia) Muslim Gadzhimagomedov	5

Quarterfinals
(Greece) Vagkan Nanitzanian	0
(Russia) Muslim Gadzhimagomedov	5
