= María Moronta =

Dominican boxer (born 1996)

Personal information
- Full name: María Altagracia Moronta Hernández
- Nationality: Dominican
- Born: 6 July 1996 (age 29)

Sport
- Sport: Boxing
Medal record
Women's amateur boxing
Representing Dominican Republic
Pan American Games
Bronze medal – third place	2019 Lima	Welterweight
Central American and Caribbean Games
Bronze medal – third place	2018 Barranquilla	Welterweight
Bolivarian Games
Silver medal – second place	2022 Valledupar	Welterweight

María Altagracia Moronta Hernández (born 6 July 1996) is a Dominican boxer. She competed in the women's welterweight event at the 2020 Summer Olympics.
