= Elia Carranza =

American boxer (born 1990)

Personal information
- Born: 17 October 1990 (age 35) Miami, Florida, U.S
- Height: 5 ft 7 in (170 cm)
- Weight: Super-welterweight

Boxing career

Boxing record
- Total fights: 14
- Wins: 11
- Win by KO: 3
- Losses: 2
- Draws: 1

Elia Carranza (born 17 October 1990) is an American professional boxer. She challenged unbeaten champion Oshae Jones for the IBF and IBO female super-welterweight titles at The Tabernacle in Atlanta, Georgia, on 25 July 2025, losing on a split decision with the judges' scorecards reading 100–90, 92–98 and 94–96. A rematch between Carranza and Jones took place at Caribe Royale Resort in Orlando, Florida on 13 June 2026. The fight ended in a split draw with one judge scoring it 96–94 in her favour, one having it 94–96 for her opponent and the third ruling it a 95–95 tie. Away from boxing, Carranza is a police officer with the Broward County Sheriff's Office in Florida.
