= Boxing at the 2019 Pan American Games – Women's 69 kg =

Women's Welterweight at the 2019 Pan American Games
- Venue: Miguel Grau Coliseum
- Dates: July 27 – August 1, 2019
- Competitors: 7 from 7 nations

Medalists
Gold medal	Oshae Jones	United States
Silver medal	Myriam Da Silva	Canada
Bronze medal	Brianda Cruz	Mexico
Bronze medal	María Moronta	Dominican Republic

The Women's welterweight competition of the boxing events at the 2019 Pan American Games in Lima, Peru, was held between the 27 of July and the 1 of August 2019 at the Miguel Grau Coliseum.

Like all Pan American boxing events, the competition is a straight single-elimination tournament. Both semifinal losers are awarded bronze medals, so no boxers compete again after their first loss. Bouts consist of a 3 round "10-point must" scoring system used in the pro game, where the winner of each round must be awarded 10 points and the loser a lesser amount, and the elimination of the padded headgear. Five judges scored each bout. The winner will be the boxer who scored the most at the end of the match.

== Results ==
=== Bracket ===
Quarterfinals; July 27, 2019		Semifinals; July 30, 2019		Final; August 1, 2019
		Myriam Da Silva (CAN)	4
Brianda Cruz (MEX)	5	Brianda Cruz (MEX)	1
Keyling Osejo (NCA)	0			Myriam Da Silva (CAN)	0
María Moronta (DOM)	5			Oshae Jones (USA)	5
Paola Calderon (COL)	0	María Moronta (DOM)	1
Oshae Jones (USA)	3	Oshae Jones (USA)	4
Atheyna Bylon (PAN)	2
