= Dilshodbek Ruzmetov =

Uzbek boxer (born 1999)

Personal information
- Nationality: Uzbek
- Born: 12 March 1999 (age 27) Urgench, Uzbekistan
- Weight: Light-heavyweight

Boxing career
- Stance: Southpaw

Boxing record
- Total fights: 3
- Wins: 3
- Win by KO: 1
Medal record
Men's amateur boxing
Representing Uzbekistan
World Championships
Silver medal – second place	2019 Yekaterinburg	Light heavyweight
Asian Championships
Gold medal – first place	2021 Dubai	Light heavyweight

Dilshodbek Ruzmetov (born 12 March 1999) is an Uzbek professional boxer. As an amateur, Ruzmetov won a gold medal at the 2021 Asian Championships and a silver medal at the 2019 World Championships. Ruzmetov also competed at the 2020 Summer Olympics. He trains under Farrukh Kilichev.

== Amateur career ==
=== Olympic result ===
Tokyo 2020

- Round of 32: Defeated Emmett Brennan (Republic of Ireland) 5–0
- Round of 16: Defeated by Loren Alfonso (Azerbaijan) 4–1

=== World Championships result ===
Yekaterinburg 2019

- First round: Defeated Shinebayar Narmandakh (Mongolia) 5–0
- Second round: Defeated Peter Pita (Democratic Republic of the Congo) 5–0
- Third round: Defeated Andrei Aradoaie (Romania) 5–0
- Quarter-finals: Defeated Loren Alfonso (Azerbaijan) 3–2
- Semi-finals: Defeated Benjamin Whittaker (England) 5–0
- Final: Defeated by Bekzad Nurdauletov (Kazakhstan) 5–0

== Professional boxing record ==
2 fights	2 wins	0 losses
By knockout	0	0
By decision	2	0

No.	Result	Record	Opponent	Type	Round, time	Date	Location	Notes
2	Win	2–0	Jesus Moroyoqui Palomares	UD	6	4 Mar 2023	Polideportivo Juan S. Millan, Culiacan, Mexico	
1	Win	1–0	Maxim Smirnov	UD	6	17 Dec 2021	Hotel Renaissance, Tashkent, Uzbekistan	
