= Turabek Khabibullaev =

Uzbekistani boxer (born 2004)

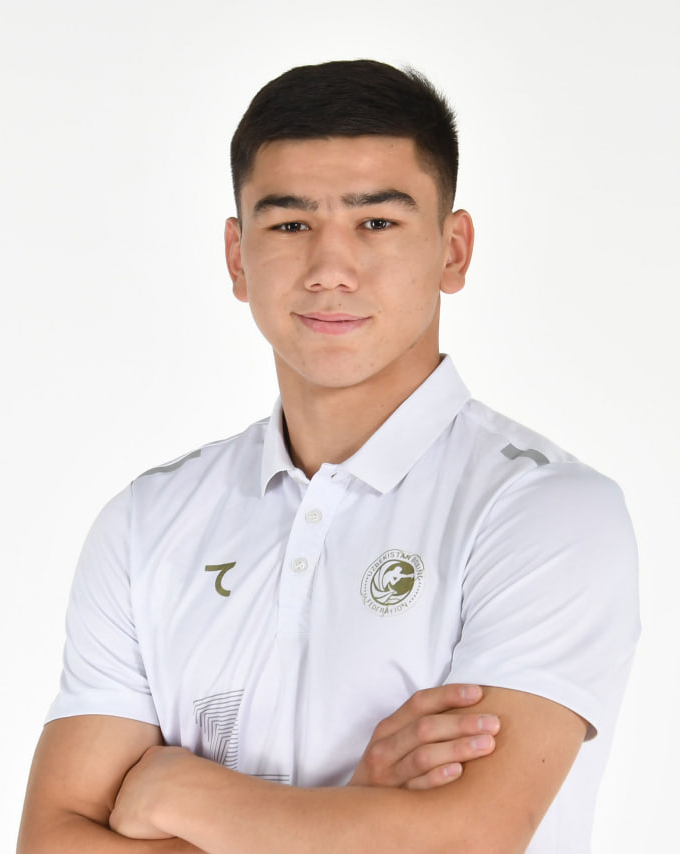

Personal information
- Born: 9 April 2004 (age 22) Chinoz, Uzbekistan
- Height: 1.90 m (6 ft 3 in)
- Weight: Heavyweight

Boxing career
- Stance: Orthodox
Medal record
Men's amateur boxer
Representing Uzbekistan
World Championships
Gold medal – first place	2025 Liverpool	90 kg
IBA World Championships
Silver medal – second place	2025 Dubai	Heavyweight
Asian Games
Gold medal – first place	2026 Nagoya	90 kg
Bronze medal – third place	2022 Hangzhou	80 kg
Asian Championships
Gold medal – first place	2024 Chiang Mai	Light heavyweight
Youth World Championships
Gold medal – first place	2022 La Nucia	Middleweight

Turabek Khabibullaev (Uzbek: To'rabek Habibullayev Shukrilla o‘g‘li; born 9 April 2004) is an Uzbekistani amateur boxer who won a gold medal at the Youth World Championships and men's 90 kg event at the 2025 World Boxing Championships in Liverpool. He has been selected by Uzbekistan for the 2024 Summer Olympics.

== Career ==
Khabibullaev began his career by winning the middleweight gold medal at the 2022 IBA Youth World Boxing Championships in La Nucía. Later he moved into the elite senior ranks and won a bronze medal for Uzbekistan in the men’s 80 kg event at the 2022 Asian Games, held in Hangzhou in 2023. He secured qualification for the 2024 Summer Olympics through the first world qualification tournament in Busto Arsizio, where he earned one of the available quota places in the 80 kg division.

=== Olympic Games ===
Khabibullaev represented Uzbekistan in the men's 80 kg event at the 2024 Summer Olympics in Paris, where he defeated the Philippines' Eumir Marcial by unanimous decision in the round of 16 before losing to Cuba's Arlen López in the quarter-finals.

=== 2024 Asian Amateur Boxing Championships ===
Khabibullaev competed in the men's 80 kg event at the 2024 Asian Amateur Boxing Championships in Chiang Mai, where he won the gold medal. He defeated Abdumalik Boltaev of Tajikistan in the opening round, stopped Ahmad Samir Dawrahi of Afghanistan in the quarter-finals, beat Kazakhstan's Yerassyl Zhakpekov in the semi-finals, and overcame China's Wang Jinxiang by a 4–1 decision in the final.

2025 World Boxing Championships

Khabibullaev contested in the men's 90 kg event at the 2025 World Boxing Championships in Liverpool, where he won the gold medal. He defeated Greece's Vangelis Nanitzanian and Kazakhstan's Sagyndyk Togambay by unanimous decision, then overcame Spain's Enmanuel Reyes Pla by split decision in the semi-finals before beating Brazil's Isaias Filho by unanimous decision in the final.

=== 2025 IBA Men's World Boxing Championships ===
At the 2025 IBA Men's World Boxing Championships in Dubai, Khabibullaev competed in the heavyweight division and won the silver medal. He began his campaign with a referee-stopped victory over Brazil's Kalil Paiva, then defeated Cuba's Julio César La Cruz by split decision and Azerbaijan's Loren Alfonso by unanimous decision to advance to the final, where he lost to Russia's Muslim Gadzhimagomedov by unanimous decision.
