= Kalvin Henderson =

American boxer

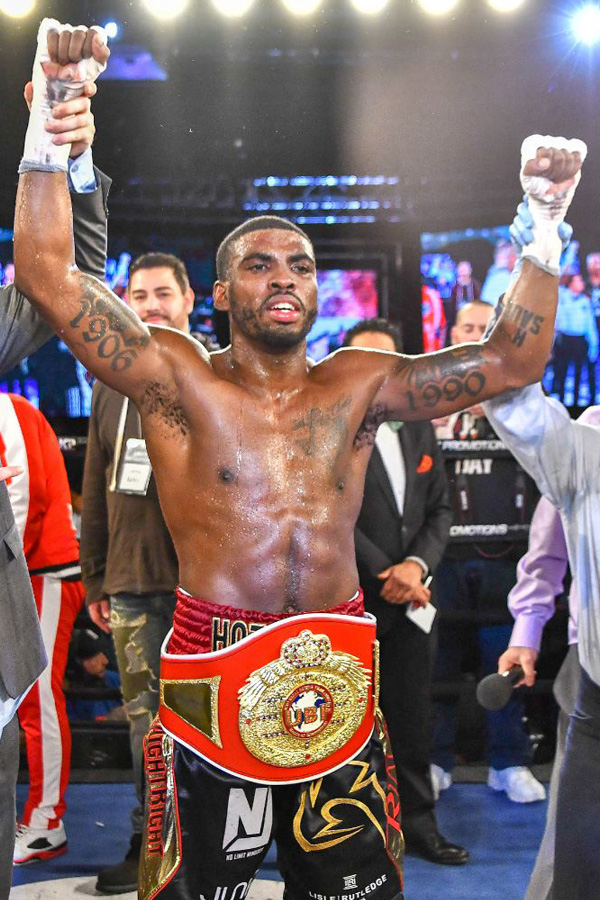

Personal information
- Nickname: Hot Sauce
- Born: June 24, 1990 (age 36) Fort Worth, Texas, U.S.
- Height: 6 ft (183 cm)
- Weight: Super-middleweight; Light-heavyweight

Boxing career
- Reach: 70 in (178 cm)
- Stance: orthodox

Boxing record
- Total fights: 22
- Wins: 19
- Win by KO: 13
- Losses: 2
- Draws: 1

Kalvin "Hot Sauce" Henderson (born June 24, 1990) is an American professional boxer. He has held the Universal Boxing Federation intercontinental super-middleweight title and competed for the World Boxing Association Super-middleweight title. As an amateur boxer, he was a four-time Arkansas state champion.

== Personal life ==
Henderson began boxing at the age of 15 while living in Fort Worth, Texas. While having an aptitude in early life for other sports including track and field, football, and basketball, it was boxing that would become his career.

Henderson moved to Fayetteville, Arkansas in 2007 to attend school at the University of Arkansas, where he earned a bachelor's degree in music education while also playing as a percussionist for the university's marching band.

After graduating college, Henderson began training with his current coach Kevin Lightburn at Straightright Boxing in Springdale, Arkansas. Along with Lightburn, Henderson also coaches young fighters and is part of the Arkansas Boxing Foundation, a non-profit organization focused on using boxing as a sport to support positive outcomes for youths in Arkansas.

Henderson is married and the father of five children.

== "Lost in the Sauce" Documentary ==
Henderson is the subject of a 2021 documentary Lost in the Sauce: The Kalvin Henderson Story directed by Bernard Oliver. The documentary chronicles the journey and struggles of Henderson as a successful prize fighter.

The documentary has screened at numerous film festivals including Cannes Shorts festival and the Tokyo Film Awards, and garnered awards at the Fayetteville Film Fest and Rogers Short Film Festival.

== Amateur career ==
During his time as an amateur, Henderson competed in over 70 bouts, earning a number of accolades including:

- 2010 Texas Games Gold Medalist
- 2011 Texas Games Silver Medalist
- 4x Arkansas State Golden Gloves Champion
- 2011 Ft. Worth Regional Golden Gloves Champion
- 2013 Mid South Regional Golden Gloves Champion
- 2015 Team USA middleweight representative for the World Series of Boxing (WSB)
- Ranked #4 in middleweight in the United States, ranked #25 worldwide

== Professional career ==
As a professional boxer, Henderson has ranked as high as #10 in the world in the WBA super-middleweight boxing rankings and has fought on a number of televised boxing promotions for Showtime and Fox Sports 1.

After his amateur career, Henderson made his professional debut on April 30, 2016, scoring a first-round technical knockout (TKO) over Tiriik Johnson at the Fisher Armory in Little Rock, Arkansas.

Henderson would then go on to win nine more fights between August 2016 and September 2018, bringing his record to 10 wins and 0 losses, including five TKO victories, before facing Brandon Robinson for the vacant Universal Boxing Federation inter continental super-middleweight title on December 7, 2018, at the 2300 Arena in Philadelphia. He would win the fight in the seventh round, knocking Robinson to the canvas twice, first with uppercut, and again with an overhand right before the referee stopped the fight, declaring a TKO victory for Henderson. The title victory for Henderson, which was considered an upset by commentators, earned him the Bennie Briscoe Philly Fight of the Year award.

In 2019, Henderson would compete in two fights, beating Antowyan Aikens by TKO and earning a majority draw in a bout against Genc Pllana. In 2021, Henderson would fight four times, winning three of the four bouts by KO or TKO. During a fight against Isaiah Steen on July 23, 2021, Henderson tore his rotator cuff. Despite making the fight competitive, Henderson would lose to Steen via majority decision. Shortly after on October 30, 2021, Henderson would defeat Robert Burwell by TKO.

On June 4, 2022, now with a record of 15 wins, 1 draw, and 1 loss, Henderson faced WBA super-middleweight champion Davild Morrell for the title at the Minneapolis Armory in Minnesota, broadcast on Showtime. In the anticipated title fight, which broke attendance records at the Minneapolis Armory, Morrell would win via fourth-round TKO stoppage despite some counterpunching attempts from Henderson. Since his title fight against Morrell in 2022, Henderson has fought four times, earning victories in all four bouts, two by TKO and two by decision.

In January 2025, Henderson went viral on social media after photos of a bloodied boxer/influencer Jake Paul began circulating on several boxing websites. During Jake Paul's training camp for his 2023 fight against Tommy Fury, Henderson was hired as a sparring partner, but after giving Paul a bloody nose during a rough sparring session, Henderson was dismissed from Paul's camp.

== Professional boxing record ==
22 fights	19 wins	2 losses
By knockout	13	1
By decision	6	1
Draws	1	

No.	Result	Record	Opponent	Type	Round, Time	Date	Location	Notes
22	Win	19-2-1	(United States) Cleotis Pendarvis	UD	8	Oct 11, 2024	(United States) Little Rock, Arkansas, U.S.	
21	Win	18-2-1	(United States) Nafys Anas Garner	TKO	6 (8) 2:59	Mar 02, 2024	(United States) Springdale Civic Center, Springdale, Arkansas, U.S.	
20	Win	17-2-1	(United States) Antonio Louis Hernandez	TKO	4 (8) 2:48	Dec 16, 2023	(United States) Springdale Civic Center, Springdale, Arkansas, U.S.	
19	Win	16-2-1	(United States) Twon Smith	UD	6	Jan 21, 2023	(United States) Buffalo Run Casino, Miami, US	
18	Loss	15-2-1	(Cuba) David Morrell	TKO	4 (12) 2:35	Jun 4, 2022	(United States) Minneapolis Armory, Minneapolis, Minnesota, U.S.	For WBA (Regular) super-middleweight title
17	Win	15-1-1	(United States) Robert Burwell	TKO	2 (8) 1:57	Oct 30, 2021	(United States) Metro Plex Event Center, Rogers, Arkansas, US	
16	Loss	14-1-1	(United States) Isaiah Steen	UD	10	Jul 23, 2021	(United States) Heartland Events Center, Grand Island, Nebraska, US	
15	Win	14-0-1	(United States) Tevin Anderson	KO	4 (6) 3:00	Jun 5, 2021	(United States) Springdale Civic Center, Springdale, Arkansas, US	
14	Win	13-0-1	(United States) Justin Baesman	KO	2 (6) 1:15	Mar 27, 2021	(United States) Heartland Events Center, Grand Island, Nebraska, US	
13	Draw	12-0-1	(Kosovo) Genc Pllana	MD	8	Dec 6, 2019	(United States) 2300 Arena, Philadelphia, US	
12	Win	12-0	(United States) Antowyan Aikens	TKO	3 (8) 2:14	May 10, 2019	(United States) 2300 Arena, Philadelphia, US	
11	Win	11-0	(United States) Brandon Robinson	TKO	7 (10) 2:08	Dec 7, 2018	(United States) 2300 Arena, Philadelphia, US	Won vacant UBF inter continental super-middleweight title
10	Win	10-0	(United States) Billy Cunningham	TKO	5 (6) 1:35	Sep 15, 2018	(United States) Clear Channel Metroplex Event Center, Little Rock, Arkansas, US	
9	Win	9-0	(United States) Vance Garvey	RTD	5 (8)	Mar 31, 2018	(United States) Clear Channel Metroplex Event Center, Little Rock, Arkansas, US	
8	Win	8-0	(United States) Taronze Washington	UD	6	November 18, 2017	(United States) Clear Channel Metroplex Event Center, Little Rock, Arkansas, US	
7	Win	7-0	(United States) Engelberto Valenzuela	TKO	1 (6) 0:25	Jul 18, 2017	(United States) Rapides Parish Coliseum, Alexandria, Louisiana, US	
6	Win	6-0	(United States) Bobby Taylor	SD	4	Apr 15, 2017	(United States) Clear Channel Metroplex Event Center, Little Rock, Arkansas, US	
5	Win	5-0	(United States) Carlos Dixon	UD	4	Feb 18, 2017	(United States) Metro Plex Event Center, Rogers, Arkansas, US	
4	Win	4-0	(United States) Henry Mercer	TKO	1 (4) 0:44	Dec 10, 2016	(United States) Minges Coliseum, Greenville, North Carolina, US	
3	Win	3-0	(United States) Joe Bradshaw	TKO	1 (4) 2:33	Nov 5, 2016	(United States) Brock Gymnasium, Okmulgee, Oklahoma, US	
2	Win	2-0	(United States) Cameron Burroughs	UD	4	Aug 20, 2016	(United States) Clear Channel Metroplex Event Center, Little Rock, Arkansas, US	
1	Win	1-0	(United States) Tiriik Johnson	TKO	1 (4) 0:23	Apr 30, 2016	(United States) Fisher Armory, North Little Rock, Arkansas, US	Professional debut.
