= Brianda Cruz =

Mexican boxer (born 1998)

Personal information
- Born: Brianda Tamara Cruz Sandoval; 21 December 1998 (age 27) Mazatlán, Sinaloa, Mexico

Boxing career
Medal record
Women's amateur boxing
Representing Mexico
Pan American Games
Bronze medal – third place	2019 Lima	Welterweight

Brianda Tamara Cruz Sandoval (born 21 December 1998) is a Mexican boxer. She won the bronze medal in the women's welterweight class at the 2019 Pan American Games in Lima. She also qualified for the 2020 Summer Olympics.

It was the first time that two national female boxers competed in an Olympic Games.
