= Eworitse Ezra Arenyeka =

Nigerian-born UK-based professional boxer

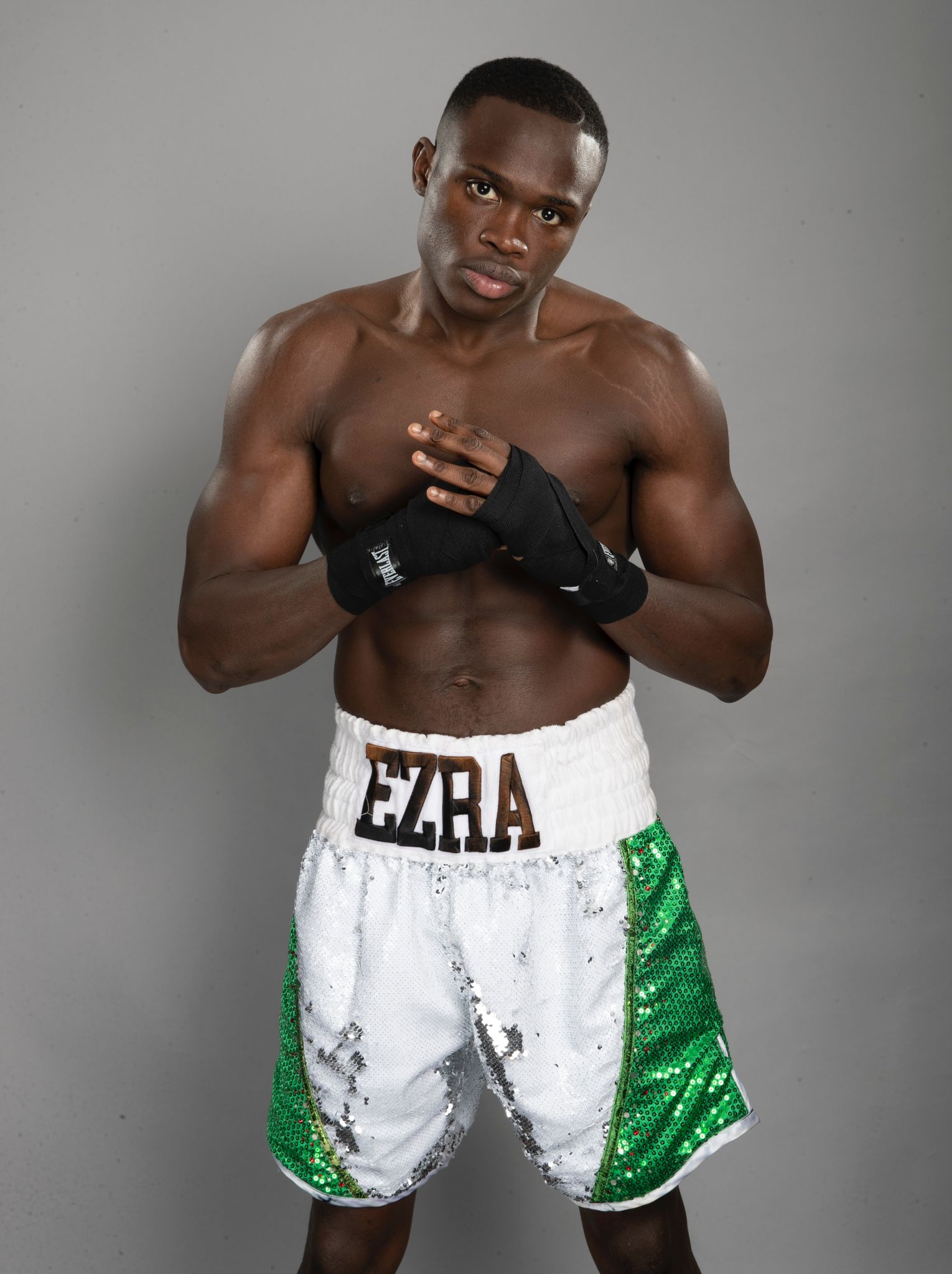
Arenyeka in 2024

Eworitse Ezra Arenyeka (born 16 August 1995) is a Nigerian-born UK-based professional boxer. He currently competes in the light-heavyweight division. In 2019, he won the ABA's Elite Cruiserweight Eastern Counties Championships and in 2022, he won the Nigerian Super Middleweight Title.

== Early life ==
Arenyeka was born on 16 August 1995 in Warri, Delta State, Nigeria. He left for the United States at the age of 14 for better educational opportunities. He lived and studied in Atlanta, Georgia, for three years before moving to the UK at 17.

== Education ==
Arenyeka left Nigeria at the age of 14 in pursuit of better educational opportunities. He lived and studied in Atlanta, Georgia, for three years before moving to the UK at 17, where he attended Newcastle University for a year. He obtained a B.Sc. in business and financial management from the University of Salford in 2016, and later obtained an M.Sc. from the University of East Anglia in 2018. He is expected to complete his PhD from the University of East Anglia in 2025.

== Amateur career ==
Arenyeka started boxing in 2016 through White Collar Fighter based in Manchester, primarily to raise funds for charity, as a philanthropist. Arenyeka's amateur boxing career kicked off in 2017, and two years into his amateur career, he won the ABA Elite Cruiserweight Eastern Counties Championships, which marked a milestone in his amateur boxing career.

== Professional career ==
Arenyeka began his professional boxing career in 2022 and in the first year of his professional boxing career, he had 10 wins (8 knockouts) and 0 losses, up until June 15, 2024, when he lost his first professional boxing match to Benjamin Whittaker with scores of 100-89, 99-90, 99-90.

== Philanthropy movement ==
Arenyeka has always been interested in using his success in his boxing career to also engage in philanthropy through his foundation, The Ezra Arenyeka Foundation which was created in 2019. In 2020, Arenyeka raised a total of £1,000 through running 10 miles daily for 10 days and donated it directly to charity for the St Martin homeless charity in Norwich. In 2022, The Ezra Arenyeka Foundation donated funds for people in need of kidney dialysis treatments in Warri.
