= Bruno Sandoval =

Mexican boxer (born 1991)

Personal information
- Nickname: El Tiburón
- Born: Bruno Sandoval Núñez; April 15, 1991 (age 35) Mexico City, Mexico
- Height: 1.88 m (6 ft 2 in)
- Weight: Super Middleweight; Middleweight

Boxing career
- Reach: 1.92 m (76 in)
- Stance: Orthodox

Boxing record
- Total fights: 22
- Wins: 19
- Win by KO: 15
- Losses: 2
- Draws: 1
- No contests: 0

Bruno Sandoval Núñez (born April 15, 1991) is a Mexican professional boxer Sandoval is promoted by current WBC Champion, Mexican Saúl Álvarez' company Canelo Promotions.

== Professional career ==
On November 3, 2012, Sandoval knocked out Eduardo Tercero to win the WBC USNBC Super Middleweight Championship. This bout was held at the Unidad Deportiva "El Chamizal" in Zamora, Michoacán, Mexico.

In April 2013 Bruno was named the prospect of the year by Mexico City's Boxing Commission.
