= Jeric =

Jeric is a given name. Notable people with the name include:

- Jeric Fortuna (born 1991), Filipino basketball player
- Jeric Gonzales (born 1992), Filipino TV personality
- Jeric T (born 1986), Singaporean singer-songwriter
- Jeric Teng (born 1991), Filipino basketball player

== See also ==
- Jeri
