= Oshae Jones =

American welterweight boxer (born 1998)

Personal information
- Nationality: American
- Born: March 1, 1998 (age 28) Toledo, Ohio

Boxing career
- Weight class: Welterweight, Super-welterweight

Boxing record
- Total fights: 10
- Wins: 9
- Win by KO: 3
- Losses: 0
- Draws: 1
- No contests: 0
Medal record
Women's amateur boxing
Representing United States
Olympic Games
Bronze medal – third place	2020 Tokyo	Welterweight
Pan American Games
Gold medal – first place	2019 Lima	Welterweight

Oshae Jones (born March 1, 1998) is an American professional boxer. She has held the IBF and IBO female super-welterweight titles since November 2024. As an amateur, Jones won the bronze medal in the women's welterweight event at the 2020 Summer Olympics

== Professional career ==
Jones won the IBF and IBO female super-welterweight titles by defeating defending champion Femke Hermans by split decision in Atlanta on 22 November 2024.

She made the first defense of her titles against Elia Carranza at The Tabernacle in Atlanta, Georgia, on 25 July 2025, winning by split decision.

In January 2026, Jones signed with Most Valuable Promotions (MVP).

Jones faced a rematch against Elia Carranza at Caribe Royale Resort in Orlando, Florida, on 13 June 2026. The fight ended in a split draw with one judge scoring it 96–94 in her favour, one having it 94–96 for her opponent and the third ruling it a 95–95 tie.

== Arrest and lawsuit ==
In July 31, 2022, Jones was arrested near her home in Toledo, Ohio around 4 AM. The police claimed that they broke up "a large scene of people participating in a course of disorderly conduct", and that Jones had failed to obey their orders; during the arrest, one of the officers, Ashlyn Pluff, punched Jones in the back of the head while Jones was being held by other officers with her hands held behind her back. Jones was charged with resisting arrest, obstructing official business and failure to disperse, pleading not guilty to all charges.

Jones claimed that she had nothing to do with the initial disorderly conduct for which the police was called, and was asleep in her home when she was woken up by an officer trying to kick her door open. She further claims that after answering the door, she asked to know the officer's badge number, after which she was arrested and punched. She later asked for a formal apology and the dismissal of the charges against her; she changed her plea to a no contest in February 2023, resulting in her case being dismissed in exchange for Jones having to complete a safety and justice class. Officers' body camera footage shows Jones asking officers' badge numbers, her arrest, and the strike she receives from Pluff. After an internal investigation, the Toledo Police Department ruled in January 2023 that the strike by Pluff was a justified use of force.

In August 2023, Jones filed a lawsuit against the city of Toledo, Pluff, and another police officer, Samantha Kill, on seven counts relating to Jones' 2022 arrest. The lawsuit alleged that the police was responsible for an "unjustified and excessive use of force" and that Jones' constitutional rights were violated through excessive use of force and racial discrimination.

== Personal life ==
Her younger brother, Otha Jones III, is also a boxer.

== Professional boxing record ==
10 fights	9 wins	0 losses
By knockout	3	0
By decision	6	0
Draws	1	

No.	Result	Record	Opponent	Type	Round, time	Date	Location	Notes
10	Draw	9-0-1	(United States) Elia Carranza	SD	10	13 Jun 2026	(United States) Caribe Royale Resort, Orlando, Florida, U.S.	Retained the IBF and IBO female super-welterweight titles
9	Win	9-0	(United States) Elia Carranza	SD	10	25 Jul 2025	(United States) The Tabernacle, Atlanta, U.S.	Retained the IBF and IBO female super-welterweight titles
8	Win	8-0	(Belgium) Femke Hermans	SD	10	22 Nov 2024	(United States) Corey Studios at Corey Tower, Atlanta, U.S.	Won the IBF and IBO female super-welterweight titles
7	Win	7-0	(Brazil) Simone Aparecida da Silva	TKO	5 (8) 1:54	12 Jul 2024	(United States) Overtime Elite Arena, Atlanta, Georgia, U.S.	
6	Win	6-0	(United States) Sonya Dreiling	TKO	5 (10) 1:06	29 Mar 2024	(United States) Overtime Elite Arena, Atlanta, Georgia, U.S.	
5	Win	5-0	(United States) Samantha Pill	TKO	1 (8) 1:39	10 Nov 2023	(United States) 2300 Arena, Philadelphia, Pennsylvania, U.S.	Won NABF female super welterweight title
4	Win	4-0	(United States) Miranda Barber	UD	8	4 Aug 2023	(United States) Overtime Elite Arena, Atlanta, Georgia, U.S.	
3	Win	3-0	(Brazil) Simone Aparecida da Silva	MD	6	31 Mar 2023	(The Bahamas) Kendal G. L. Isaacs National Gymnasium, Nassau, Bahamas	
2	Win	2-0	(Dominican Republic) Dahianna Santana	UD	6	11 Mar 2023	(United States) 2300 Arena, Philadelphia, Pennsylvania, U.S.	
1	Win	1-0	(United States) Sonya Dreiling	UD	6	10 Jun 2022	(United States) Turning Stone Resort Casino, Verona, New York, U.S.	
