= Conner Tudsbury =

English boxer

Personal information
- Nationality: English
- Born: 3 March 2000 (age 26) Manchester, England
- Weight: Middleweight

Boxing career
Medal record
Men's amateur boxing
Representing England
Youth World Championships
| Bronze medal – third place | 2018 Budapest | Middleweight |
European Youth Championships
| Bronze medal – third place | 2018 Roseto | Middleweight |

Conner Tudsbury (born 3 March 2000) is an English amateur boxer who won bronze medals at the 2018 Youth World Championships and 2018 European Youth Championships.
