= Georgii Kushitashvili =

Russian-Georgian boxer

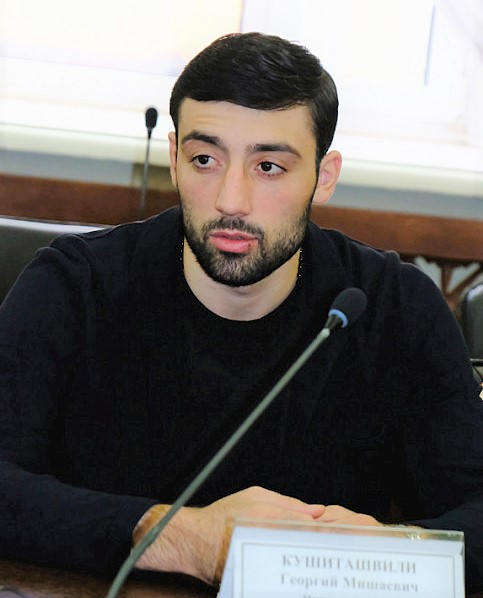
- Kushitashvili in 2018

Personal information
- Other names: Giorgi Kushitashvili; Georgy Kushitashvili
- Nationality: Russia; Georgia
- Born: 1994 or 1995 (age 30–31)

Boxing career
Medal record
Men's amateur boxing
Representing Georgia
IBA World Championships
Bronze medal – third place	2023 Tashkent	Cruiserweight
Bronze medal – third place	2025 Dubai	Cruiserweight
EUBC European Championships
Gold medal – first place	2022 Yerevan	Cruiserweight
EB European Championships
Bronze medal – third place	2026 Sofia	90 kg

Georgii Kushitashvili (born 1994/1995) is a Russian-Georgian boxer. He competed at the 2022 European Amateur Boxing Championships, winning the gold medal in the cruiserweight event. He also competed at the 2023 IBA Men's World Boxing Championships, winning the bronze medal in the same event.
