= Kane Tucker =

Irish boxer (born 2000)

Personal information
- Born: March 12, 2000 (age 26) Newry, County Down, Northern Ireland
- Height: 6 ft 2 in (188 cm)
- Weight: Light-Heavyweight

Boxing career
- Reach: 78 in (198 cm)
- Stance: Orthodox
Medal record
Representing Ireland
European Schoolboy Championships
Bronze medal – third place	2014 Hungary	Light-Welterweight
Representing Northern Ireland
Commonwealth Youth Games
Silver medal – second place	2017 Bahamas	Middle-Weight

Kane Tucker (born 12 March 2000) is an Irish amateur boxer. He competes at Light-Heavyweight (81 kg). Tucker trains at Emerald ABC Belfast, under Harry Hawkins.

== Amateur career ==
=== National Titles ===
Kane Tucker has an impressive underage record with successfully obtaining ten consecutive Irish amateur titles.

=== 2014 European Schoolboys Championships ===
Tucker won his first major international medal, a 63 kg bronze, at the 2014 European Schoolboys Championships in Keszthely, Hungary in 2014.

Results:
Light Welterweight (63 kg)
GOLD: TCAMBOV Edgard (RUS)
SILVER: SIMONOVIC Nikola (SRB)
BRONZE: TUCKER Kane (IRL)
BRONZE: ZAK Yan (ISR)

=== 2017 Commonwealth Youth Games ===
Tucker found his second success internationally in 2017, representing Northern Ireland in the Commonwealth Youth Games in Nassau, Bahamas. He was awarded a silver medal following a narrow defeat to England in the final bout of the contest.

Results:
Middleweight (75 kg)
GOLD: Aaron Patrick BowenEngland (ENG)
SILVER: Kane TuckerNorthern Ireland (NIR)
BRONZE: Kyle Ting ChenNew Zealand (NZL)
BRONZE: Satwinder ThindCanada (CAN)
