= Lennox Allen =

Guyanese boxer

Personal information
- Nickname: 2 Sharpe
- Born: Lennox Alleyne; 1 July 1985 (age 41) Georgetown, Guyana
- Height: 6 ft 1 in (185 cm)
- Weight: Super-middleweight

Boxing career
- Reach: 78 in (198 cm)
- Stance: Southpaw

Boxing record
- Total fights: 25
- Wins: 22
- Win by KO: 14
- Losses: 2
- Draws: 1

Lennox Alleyne (born 1 July 1985), better known as Lennox Allen, is a Guyanese professional boxer who challenged for the WBA interim super-middleweight title in 2020.

== Professional career ==
Allen made his professional debut on 16 April 2004, scoring a second-round technical knockout (TKO) victory against Troy Lewis at the Cliff Anderson Sports Hall in Georgetown, Guyana.

After compiling a record of 9–0 (5 KOs) he faced Leon Gilkes for the Guyanese super-middleweight title on 27 June 2009 at the Cliff Anderson Sports Hall. Allen dropped his opponent to the canvas in the first round with a left hand but was unable to capitalise on the success, allowing Gilkes to make it through the remainder of the round. 30 seconds into the second round, Allen landed another left hand to put Gilkes down for the second and final time. Gilkes was unable to recover in time, prompting the referee to call a halt to the contest, awarding Allen the Guyanese title via second-round TKO.

After two more wins in non-title fights – a six-round unanimous decision (UD) against Amador Acevedo in March 2010 followed by a sixth-round TKO against Victor Paz in July – he faced Darnell Boone on 7 August at the Aviator Sports and Events Center in New York City, fighting to a majority draw over eight rounds.

His next fight came against Nick Brinson for the vacant New York State super-middleweight title on 13 November 2010 at the Washington Avenue Armory in Albany, New York. Allen captured his captured his second professional title, defeating Brinson via seventh-round TKO.

After scoring another nine wins, six by stoppage, he faced rising prospect David Morrell (2–0, 2 KOs) for the vacant WBA interim super-middleweight title on 8 August 2020 at the Microsoft Theater in Los Angeles, California. Lennox suffered the first defeat of his career, losing by a wide UD with the judges' scorecards reading 118–110, 119–109, and 120–108.

== Professional boxing record ==
25 fights	22 wins	2 losses
By knockout	14	1
By decision	8	1
Draws	1	

No.	Result	Record	Opponent	Type	Round, time	Date	Location	Notes
25	Loss	22–2–1	Aidos Yerbossynuly	TKO	10 (12), 2:59	12 Sep 2021	Jekpe-Jek Arena, Nur-Sultan, Kazakhstan	
24	Loss	22–1–1	David Morrell Jr.	UD	12	8 Aug 2020	Microsoft Theater, Los Angeles, California, US	For vacant WBA interim super-middleweight title
23	Win	22–0–1	Derrick Webster	UD	10	15 Feb 2019	Grand Casino, Hinckley, Minnesota, US	
22	Win	21–0–1	Willis Lockett	TKO	3 (6), 3:00	21 Jul 2018	Foxwoods Resort Casino, Ledyard, Connecticut, US	
21	Win	20–0–1	Istvan Zeller	TKO	2 (10), 1:31	17 Oct 2015	EagleBank Arena, Fairfax, Virginia, US	
20	Win	19–0–1	Paul Gonsalves	KO	7 (8), 1:45	17 Apr 2015	Mohegan Sun Arena, Uncasville, Connecticut, US	
19	Win	18–0–1	Kojo Issah	KO	2 (6), 0:51	29 Jan 2015	BB King Blues Club & Grill, New York City, New York, US	
18	Win	17–0–1	Michael Gbenga	UD	6	14 Aug 2013	BB King Blues Club & Grill, New York City, New York, US	
17	Win	16–0–1	Michael Walker	RTD	4 (6), 3:00	14 Jul 2012	Rivers Casino, Pittsburgh, Pennsylvania, US	
16	Win	15–0–1	Kwesi Jones	UD	12	28 May 2011	Cliff Anderson Sports Hall, Georgetown, Guyana	
15	Win	14–0–1	Jesse Orta	TKO	2 (8), 0:37	12 Sep 2009	Yonkers Armory, Yonkers, New York, US	
14	Win	13–0–1	Nick Brinson	TKO	7 (8), 2:59	13 Nov 2010	Washington Avenue Armory, Albany, New York, US	
13	Draw	12–0–1	Darnell Boone	MD	8	7 Aug 2010	Aviator Sports and Events Center, New York City, New York, US	
12	Win	12–0	Victor Paz	TKO	6 (6), 0:16	10 Jul 2010	Mid-Hudson Civic Center, Poughkeepsie, New York, US	
11	Win	11–0	Amador Acevedo	UD	6	27 Mar 2010	Mid-Hudson Civic Center, Poughkeepsie, New York, US	
10	Win	10–0	Leon Gilkes	TKO	2 (12), 0:50	27 Jun 2009	Cliff Anderson Sports Hall, Georgetown, Guyana	Won Guyanese super-middleweight title
9	Win	9–0	Jonathan Nelson	TKO	1 2:09	16 Nov 2007	Beausejour Cricket Ground, Gros Islet, Saint Lucia	
8	Win	8–0	Rafael Romero	TKO	1 (8), 0:50	9 Dec 2006	Thirst Park, Georgetown, Guyana	
7	Win	7–0	Winston Pompey	PTS	8	7 Apr 2007	National Park, Georgetown, Guyana	
6	Win	6–0	Ade Alfons	UD	8	4 Mar 2006	Karang Melenu Sports Hall, Tenggarong, Indonesia	
5	Win	5–0	Joe Lopez	KO	1 (4), 0:42	5 Mar 2005	Hellenic Community Centre, Perth, Australia	
4	Win	4–0	Eak Ubol Por Muangubol	UD	6	24 Feb 2005	Hellenic Community Centre, Perth, Australia	
3	Win	3–0	Rhyan Foster	TKO	1 (6)	26 Dec 2004	Cliff Anderson Sports Hall, Georgetown, Guyana	
2	Win	2–0	Wayne Briggs	UD	4	29 May 2004	National Park, Georgetown, Guyana	
1	Win	1–0	Troy Lewis	TKO	2	16 Apr 2004	Cliff Anderson Sports Hall, Georgetown, Guyana	
