= Benjamin Whittaker =

British boxer (born 1997)

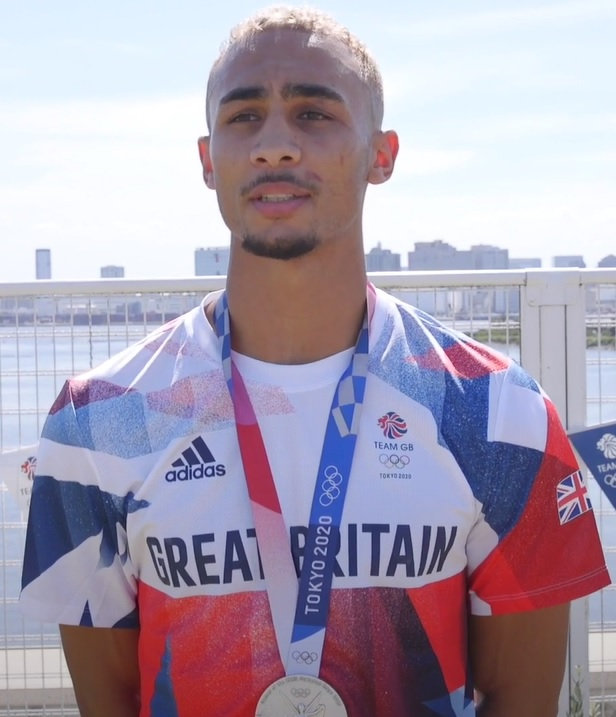
- Ben Whittaker in 2021

Personal information
- Born: 6 June 1997 (age 29) Bilston, Wolverhampton, England
- Height: 6 ft 3 in (191 cm)
- Weight: Light-heavyweight

Boxing career
- Reach: 75 in (191 cm)
- Stance: Orthodox

Boxing record
- Total fights: 14
- Wins: 13
- Win by KO: 9
- Draws: 1
Medal record
Men's Amateur boxing
Representing Great Britain
Olympic Games
Silver medal – second place	2020 Tokyo	Light-heavyweight
European Games
Silver medal – second place	2019 Minsk (Note: Also designated as the 2019 men's European Championships)	Light-heavyweight
Representing England
World Championships
Bronze medal – third place	2019 Yekaterinburg	Light-heavyweight
EU Championships
Gold medal – first place	2018 Valladolid	Light-heavyweight

Benjamin G. Whittaker (born 6 June 1997) is a British professional boxer who has held the IBF International light-heavyweight title since June 2024. As an amateur, he won a silver medal at the delayed 2020 Summer Olympics. He turned professional in 2022.

== Early life ==
Whittaker was born to an English-Austrian mother and a Jamaican father.

== Amateur career ==
In 2018, he was picked to represent England in the 2018 Commonwealth Games, which took place in Australia's Gold Coast.

In 2019, he was selected to compete at the World Championships in Yekaterinburg, Russia, where he won the bronze medal after losing by unanimous decision to Dilshodbek Ruzmetov in the semi-finals.

In 2021, at the men's light-heavyweight category at the 2020 Tokyo Olympics, Whittaker won the silver medal against Arlen Lopez, who won gold.

His amateur record stood at 53–13.

== Professional career ==
In 2022 he signed a professional deal with Boxxer, training with SugarHill Steward.

On 3 February 2024 at Wembley Arena in London, Whittaker defeated Khalid Graidia via fifth round technical knockout.

On 31 March 2024, Whittaker fought at The O2 Arena in London on the undercard of a British heavyweight title fight between Fabio Wardley and Frazer Clarke, defeating Leon Willings via unanimous decision.

On 15 June 2024, Whittaker won the IBF International light-heavyweight title after defeating 12–0 Ezra Arenyeka by unanimous decision.

On 12 October 2024, Whittaker made his first defence of his IBF International light-heavyweight title against Liam Cameron on the undercard of Artur Beterbiev vs. Dmitry Bivol. During the bout, both boxers became entangled as Whittaker pulled Cameron towards the ropes, resulting in their tumbling out of the ring, and Whittaker being forced to withdraw due to an injury. The fight subsequently went to the judges' scorecards, as per the rules of the British Boxing Board of Control, with both boxers receiving a 58–57 score respectively as well as a 58–58 score, resulting in a split decision technical draw.

Whittaker faced Cameron in a rematch in Birmingham on 20 April 2025. He won by stoppage in the second round.

In October 2025, he signed a long-term contract with Eddie Hearn led Matchroom Boxing. A month later on 29 November, Whittaker stopped Benjamin Gavazi in the first round of their fight at the National Exhibition Centre in Birmingham to win the vacant WBC Silver light-heavyweight title.

Whittaker knocked out Braian Suarez in round one at Liverpool Arena in Liverpool on 18 April 2026.

He made his United States debut against Richard Rivera at the Barclays Center in New York City on 27 June 2026. Whittaker sent his opponent to the canvas at the end of the first round and knocked him down again early in the second round, prompting the referee to stop the fight and award him the win by technical knockout.

On 3 October 2026, he faced Conor Wallace in a final eliminator for a shot at the IBF light-heavyweight title at Utilita Arena in Birmingham, winning by unanimous decision.

== Public image ==
Whittaker has attracted attention for his flamboyant in-ring style which often includes exaggerated feints and taunting gestures. His approach has divided opinion among boxing fans and commentators, with some describing it as entertaining and others viewing it as disrespectful to opponents and the sport. In 2023, ITV News reported that Whittaker had been criticised by some boxing fans for “making a mockery of the sport” and that others had said he “needs humbling”. Whittaker rejected the suggestion that his style was disrespectful, saying that boxing was “show business” and that he wanted to entertain paying spectators.

Some of Whittaker’s opponents have also criticised his over-the-top showmanship. Before their 2024 bout, Ezra Arenyeka said that Whittaker had “always showboated and acted silly in the ring” and argued that the behaviour made him appear arrogant, although Whittaker went on to defeat Arenyeka by unanimous decision. Ahead of their scheduled 2026 bout, Whittaker's opponent Richard Rivera said he was "not convinced" by Whittaker and claimed that Whittaker had "the boxing world fooled".

== Professional boxing record ==
14 fights	13 wins	0 losses
By knockout	9	0
By decision	4	0
Draws	1	

No.	Result	Record	Opponent	Type	Round, time	Date	Location	Notes
14	Win	13–0–1	Conor Wallace	UD	12	3 Oct 2026	Utilita Arena, Birmingham, England	Retained WBC Silver light-heavyweight title
13	Win	12–0–1	Richard Rivera	TKO	2 (10), 0:27	27 Jun 2026	Barclays Center, New York City, New York, U.S.	Retained WBC Silver light-heavyweight title
12	Win	11–0–1	Braian Nahuel Suarez	KO	1 (10), 2:24	18 Apr 2026	M&S Bank Arena, Liverpool, England	
11	Win	10–0–1	Benjamin Gavazi	KO	1 (10), 2:15	29 Nov 2025	National Exhibition Centre, Birmingham, England	Won vacant WBC Silver light-heavyweight title
10	Win	9–0–1	Liam Cameron	TKO	2 (10), 1:53	20 Apr 2025	bp pulse LIVE, Birmingham, England	Retained IBF International light-heavyweight title
9	Draw	8–0–1	Liam Cameron	TD	5 (10), 3:00	12 Oct 2024	Kingdom Arena, Riyadh, Saudi Arabia	Retained IBF International light-heavyweight title; For vacant WBO Global light-heavyweight title
8	Win	8–0	Eworitse Ezra Arenyeka	UD	10	15 Jun 2024	Selhurst Park, London, England	Won vacant IBF International light-heavyweight title
7	Win	7–0	Leon Willings	PTS	8	31 Mar 2024	The O2 Arena, London, England	
6	Win	6–0	Khalid Graidia	TKO	5 (8), 1:57	3 Feb 2024	OVO Arena, London, England	
5	Win	5–0	Stiven Dredhaj	KO	4 (8), 0:54	10 Dec 2023	Bournemouth International Centre, Bournemouth, England	
4	Win	4–0	Vladimir Belujsky	TKO	8 (8), 1:49	1 July 2023	Manchester Arena, Manchester, England	
3	Win	3–0	Jordan Grant	TKO	3 (6), 0:13	6 May 2023	Resorts World Arena, Birmingham, England	
2	Win	2–0	Petar Nosic	UD	6	20 Aug 2022	Jeddah Superdome, Jeddah, Saudi Arabia	
1	Win	1–0	Greg O'Neil	KO	2 (6), 0:21	30 Jul 2022	Bournemouth International Centre, Bournemouth, England	

== Anime influence ==
Whittaker has spoken publicly about his interest in Japanese Anime, which has influenced both his personal style and body art. A fan of series such as One Piece, he has incorporated this interest into multiple tattoos, including large designs inspired by its characters, and has travelled to Japan to have some of the artwork completed. He started getting his anime tattoos in Japan after he won his silver medal at the 2020 Summer Olympics in Tokyo. He has stated that his tattoos reflect his personality and individuality, and that his appreciation for anime is a significant part of his identity outside the ring.
