= Herich Ruiz =

Cuban boxer

Personal information
- Nationality: Cuba

Boxing career
Medal record
Men's amateur boxing
Representing Cuba
IBA World Championships
Bronze medal – third place	2021 Belgrade	Cruiserweight

Herich Ruiz is a Cuban boxer. He competed at the 2021 AIBA World Boxing Championships, winning the bronze medal in the cruiserweight event.

In 2022, Ruiz emigrated to the United States.
