= Rocky Jerkic =

Australian boxer

Personal information
- Nationality: Australian
- Born: 1 March 1988 (age 38) Darwin Northern Territory, Australia
- Height: 183 cm (6 ft 0 in)
- Weight: Super Welterweight / Jr. Middleweight

Boxing career
- Stance: Orthodox

Boxing record
- Total fights: 12
- Wins: 12
- Win by KO: 9
- Losses: 0
- Draws: 0

Rocky Jerkic (born 1 March 1988) is an Australian professional boxer. He is currently one of top propects in the Jr. Middleweight division in Australia he holds the Australian super welterweight and IBO Inter-Continental super welterweight titles.

== Early life ==
Born in Darwin, Northern Territory Queensland Australia to an Indigenous Australian mother and Croatian father. Jerkic was raised by his father, his mother left when he was two months old. In 2015 he made contact with his Aboriginal mother for the first time since her departure.

=== Amateur career ===
Jerkic, started boxing in Fred Brophy's boxing tent when he was 9, has won 98 of his 104 amateur fights.

== Professional career ==
In 2015 he has won the WBA Asia Pacific super welterweight title with a 3rd round stoppage of Adrian Campbell, vacant IBO Asia Pacific super welterweight title with a 3rd round stoppage of Wiraphot Phaennarong, the vacant IBO Inter-Continental super welterweight title with a Unanimous Decision over Arnel Tinampay and Australia National super welterweight title with an 8th round stoppage over Quade Cooper's trainer Shannon King on the Footy Show Fight Night.

== Professional boxing record ==
12 wins (12 knockouts, 3 decision), 0 loss, 0 draws
Res.	Record	Opponent	Type	Round	Date	Location	Notes
Win	12–0	Shannon King	TKO	8 (10)	2015-11-28	Mansfield Tavern, Mansfield, Queensland, Australia	Australian super welterweight title
Win	11–0	Arnel Tinampay	UD	10 (10)	2015-07-04	Civic Centre, Singleton, New South Wales, Australia	vacant International Boxing Organization Inter-Continental super welterweight title
Win	10–0	Wiraphot Phaennarong	TKO	3 (12)	2015-05-23	Whitlam Leisure Centre, Liverpool, New South Wales, Australia	vacant International Boxing Organization Asia Pacific super welterweight title
Win	9–0	Adrian Campbell	TKO	3 (10)	2015-04-24	Panthers Newcastle, Newcastle West, New South Wales, Australia	
Win	8–0	Alex Ah Tong	TKO	4 (6)	2014-11-14	Panthers Newcastle, Newcastle West, New South Wales, Australia	
Win	7–0	Joe Rea	TKO	1 (4)	2014-04-25	Entertainment Centre, Hurstville, New South Wales, Australia	
Win	6–0	Jody Allen	TKO	1 (4)	2013-11-16	Royal International Convention Centre, Brisbane, Queensland, Australia	
Win	5–0	Daniel Roy Maxwell	TKO	1 (6)	2012-06-02	Orange Function Centre, Orange, New South Wales, Australia	
Win	4–0	Aswin Cabuy	TD	4 (6)	2012-03-31	Croatian Club, Punchbowl, New South Wales, Australia	
Win	3–0	Dinesh Kanth	KO	1 (6)	2012-02-24	The Melbourne Pavilion, Flemington, Victoria, Australia	
Win	2–0	Dickey Peirera	TKO	1 (4)	2012-02-08	Claudelands Arena, Hamilton, New Zealand	
Win	1–0	Stavros Karanicolas	UD	4 (4)	2011-10-19	Entertainment Centre, Newcastle, New South Wales, Australia	

Preceded by Shannon King	Australian Super Welterweight Champion; 2015	Succeeded by
Preceded by Nick Klappert	IBO Inter-Continental Super Welterweight Champion; 2015	Succeeded by
Preceded by Ryan Waters	IBO Asia Pacific super welterweight Champion; 2015	Succeeded by
