= Sharabutdin Ataev =

Russian boxer

Personal information
- Nationality: Russia
- Born: 10 June 1999 (age 27) Dorgeli, Dagestan, Russia

Boxing career
Medal record
Men's amateur boxing
Representing Russia
IBA World Championships
Gold medal – first place	2023 Tashkent	Cruiserweight
Gold medal – first place	2025 Dubai	Cruiserweight
European Championships
Gold medal – first place	2024 Belgrade	Cruiserweight

Sharabutdin Zairbekovich Ataev (Russian: Шарабутдин Заирбекович Атаев; born 10 June 1999) is a Russian boxer. He competed at the 2023 IBA Men's World Boxing Championships, winning the gold medal in the cruiserweight event. He also competed at the 2024 European Amateur Boxing Championships, winning the gold medal in the same event.
