= Rogelio Romero =

Mexican boxer (born 1995)

Personal information
- Born: Rogelio Romero Torres; 23 February 1995 (age 31) Ciudad Juárez, Mexico

Boxing career
Medal record
Men's amateur boxing
Representing Mexico
World Championships
Bronze medal – third place	2023 Tashkent	Cruiserweight
Pan American Games
Bronze medal – third place	2015 Toronto	Light heavyweight
Bronze medal – third place	2019 Lima	Light heavyweight
Central American and Caribbean Games
Silver medal – second place	2018 Barranquilla	Light heavyweight
Bronze medal – third place	2014 Veracruz	Light heavyweight

Rogelio Romero Torres (born 23 February 1995) is a Mexican boxer in the light heavyweight (-81 kg) discipline.

Romero won the bronze medal at the 2014 and 2018 Central American and Caribbean Games as well as the 2015 and 2019 Pan American Games. He obtained a quota for the 2020 Summer Olympics.
