= Enmanuel Reyes =

Cuban-Spanish boxer (born 1992)

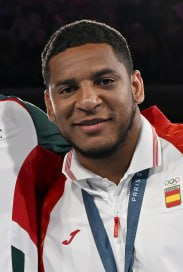
- Reyes at the 2024 Paris Olympics

Personal information
- Full name: Enmanuel Reyes Pla
- Nationality: Spanish, Cuban
- Born: 14 December 1992 (age 33) Havana, Cuba
- Height: 191 cm (6 ft 3 in)
- Weight: 92 kg (203 lb)

Sport
- Sport: Boxing
- Weight class: Heavyweight
Medal record
Men's amateur boxing
Representing Spain
Olympic Games
Bronze medal – third place	2024 Paris	Heavyweight
World Championships
Bronze medal – third place	2025 Liverpool	Heavyweight
IBA World Championships
Bronze medal – third place	2021 Belgrade	Heavyweight
Bronze medal – third place	2025 Dubai	Heavyweight
European Games
Bronze medal – third place	2023 Kraków-Małopolska	Heavyweight
European Boxing Championships
Silver medal – second place	2026 Sofia	90 kg
European Championships
Silver medal – second place	2022 Yerevan	Heavyweight
Mediterranean Games
Gold medal – first place	2026 Taranto	Heavyweight

Enmanuel Reyes Pla (born 14 December 1992) is a Spanish amateur boxer. Born in Cuba, he represents Spain internationally. He arrived in Spain in 2017 and became a naturalized citizen in 2020. He won a bronze medal in the men's heavyweight event at the 2020 Paris Olympics.
