= Keno Machado =

Brazilian boxer (born 2000)

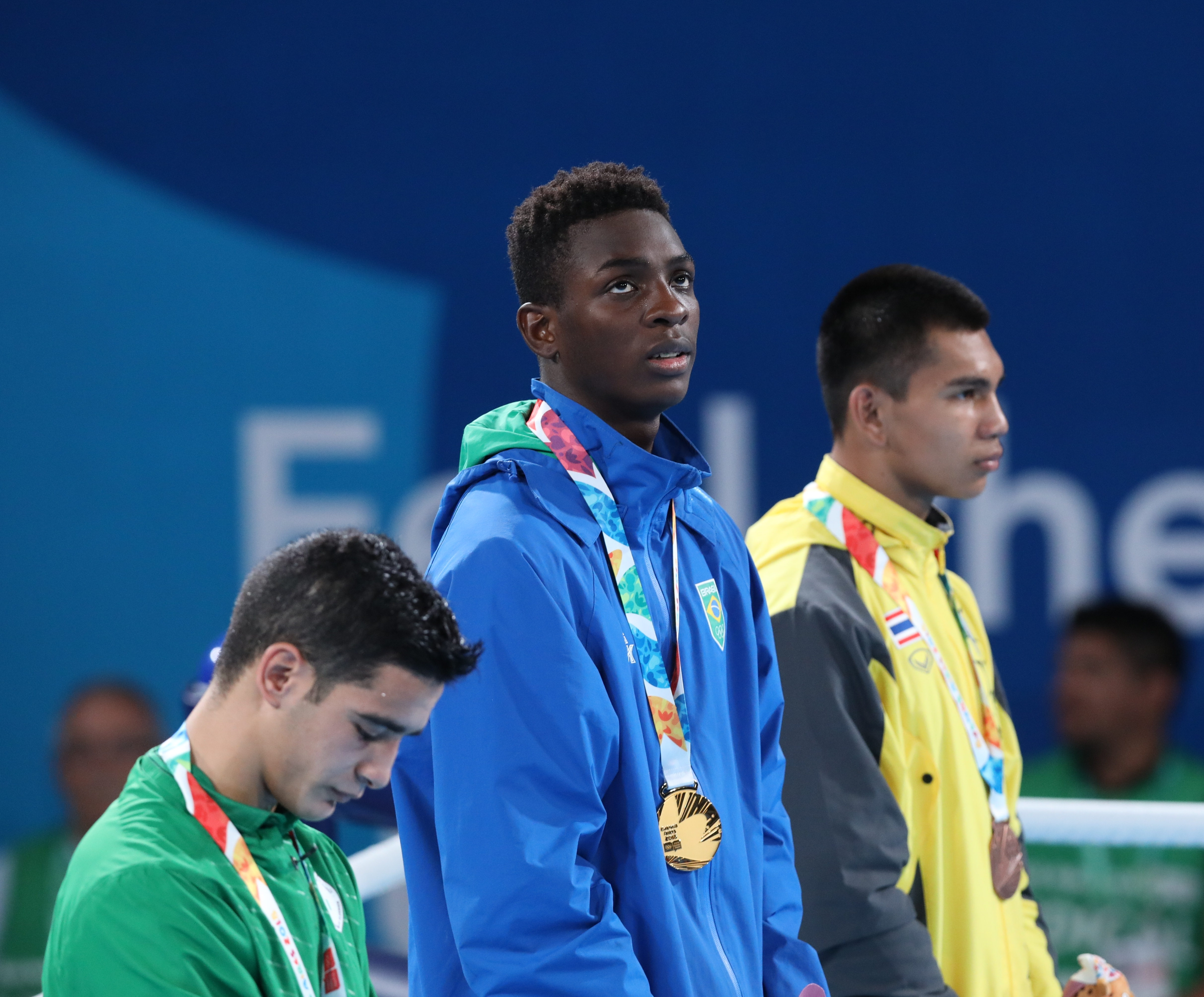
- Machado with the gold medal at the 2018 Summer Youth Olympics

Personal information
- Nickname: Keno Marley
- National team: Brazil
- Born: 11 July 2000 (age 25) Sapeaçu, Bahia, Brazil
- Height: 1.91 m (6 ft 3 in)

Sport
- Country: Brazil
- Sport: Boxing
Medal record
Men's amateur boxing
Representing Brazil
World Championships
Silver medal – second place	2021 Belgrade	Cruiserweight
Pan American Games
Silver medal – second place	2019 Lima	Light heavyweight
Silver medal – second place	2023 Santiago	Heavyweight
South American Games
Silver medal – second place	2022 Asunción	Heavyweight
Youth Olympic Games
Gold medal – first place	2018 Buenos Aires	Middleweight

Keno Marley Machado (born 11 July 2000) is a Brazilian boxer. He competed in the men's light heavyweight event at the 2020 Summer Olympics. He also represented Brazil at the 2024 Summer Olympics, finishing in joint fifth place.

== Professional career ==
In April 2025, it was announced that Machado had signed with Most Valuable Promotions.

He made his professional debut against Diarra Davis Jr at the Kaseya Center in Miami, Florida, USA, on the undercard of the Jake Paul vs. Anthony Joshua fight on December 19, 2025. Machado won the four-round bout via Unanimous Decision.

== Professional boxing record ==
1 fight	1 win	0 losses
By knockout	0	0
By decision	1	0

No.	Result	Record	Opponent	Type	Round, time	Date	Location	Notes
1	Win	1–0	Diarra Davis Jr.	UD	4	Dec 19, 2025	Kaseya Center, Miami, Florida, U.S.	
