= Triathlon at the 2023 European Games =

- Venue: Nowa Huta Lake, Kraków (start)
- Dates: 27 June – 1 July
- Competitors: 120 from tbc nations

The triathlon competitions at the 2023 European Games, in Kraków, were held on 27 and 28 June, and 1 July 2023. A total of 120 athletes, 60 men and 60 women, competed. This was the second appearance of triathlon in the European Games program after 2015, and the first appearance of the mixed medley relay.

== Schedule ==
OC	Opening ceremony	M	Men's Event	W	Women's Event	MR	Mixed Relay	CC	Closing ceremony

June/July	20th Tue	21st Wed	22nd Thu	23rd Fri	24th Sat	25th Sun	26th Mon	27th Tue	28th Wed	29th Thu	30th Fri	1st Sat	2nd Sun	Total events
Ceremonies		OC											CC	
Triathlon								W	M			MR		3

== Qualification ==
The fifty-four highest ranked athletes per sex on the Europe Triathlon Ranking as of 3 May 2023 are allocated one quota place for their NOC, respecting the maximum quota allocation of three per NOC per event. In case the NOC already obtained the quotas, they will not be allocated these quota places. Any nation which qualifies two men and two women will be eligible for the team event.

== Paris 2024 qualification ==
Triathlon is one of the events where performance in the 2023 Games impacts indirectly on Olympic qualification, by way of ranking points. The events will therefore be held over the 'Olympic' distances; a 'standard' triathlon consisting of a 1500 metre swim, a 40 km bike ride and a 10 km run for the individual events, and a mixed 'super-sprint' relay consisting of 4 legs of a 350 metre swim, 10 km bike and 2000 metre run.

== Medalists ==
Event	Gold	Silver	Bronze
Men's individual	Vetle Bergsvik Thorn; Norway	Shachar Sagiv; Israel	Adrien Briffod; Switzerland
Women's individual	Solveig Løvseth; Norway	Julia Hauser; Austria	Jolien Vermeylen; Belgium
Mixed relay	Norway; Vetle Bergsvik Thorn; Lotte Miller; Casper Stornes; Solveig Løvseth	Great Britain; Barclay Izzard; Sophie Alden; Connor Bentley; Sian Rainsley	Hungary; Gergely Kiss; Zsanett Bragmayer; Gergő Dobi; Márta Kropkó

== Medal table ==
* Host nation (Poland)

Rank	Nation	Gold	Silver	Bronze	Total
1	Norway	3	0	0	3
2	Austria	0	1	0	1
2	Great Britain	0	1	0	1
2	Israel	0	1	0	1
5	Belgium	0	0	1	1
5	Hungary	0	0	1	1
5	Switzerland	0	0	1	1
Totals (7 entries)		3	3	3	9
