= Triathlon at the 2023 European Games – Women's individual =

Women's individual at the 2023 European Games
- Venue: Nowa Huta Lake
- Date: 27 June
- Competitors: 48 from 23 nations
- Winning time: 1:57:05

Medalists
gold medal	Solveig Løvseth	Norway
silver medal	Julia Hauser	Austria
bronze medal	Jolien Vermeylen	Belgium

The triathlon individual race for women at the 2023 European Games, in Kraków, was held on 27 June 2023. A total of 60 women will compete over the 'standard' or 'Olympic' distance. This will be the second appearance of triathlon in the European Games program after 2015. Reigning champion, Nicola Spirig does not start, but newly crowned European champion Jeanne Lehair will start for Luxembourg.

== Schedule ==
Date	Event	Time (local)
27 June 2023	Women's individual	10:00 a.m.
27 June 2023	Medal ceremony	12:20 p.m.

== Current champions ==
This will be the second European Games women's individual event. The current Olympic, World, Continental and European Games champions are as follows:

Event	Current champion	Venue	Year
Olympic Games	Flora Duffy (BER)	(Japan) Tokyo	2020
World Triathlon Championships	Flora Duffy (BER)	Various	2022
European Games	Nicola Spirig (SUI)	(Azerbaijan) Baku	2015
European Triathlon Championships	Jeanne Lehair (LUX)	(Spain) Málaga	2023

== Qualification ==
The fifty-four highest ranked athletes per sex on the Europe Triathlon Ranking as of 3 May 2023 are allocated one quota place for their NOC, respecting the maximum quota allocation of three per NOC per event. In case the NOC already obtained the quotas, they will not be allocated these quota places. Any nation which qualifies two men and two women will be eligible for the team event.

== Paris 2024 qualification ==
Triathlon is one of the events where performance in the 2023 Games impacts indirectly on Olympic qualification, by way of ranking points. The event will therefore be held over the Olympic distance; a 1500-metre swim, a 40 km bike ride and a 10 km run.

== Results ==
Triathlon Europe confirmed the following athletes for the event on 7 June 2023.

Rank	#	Triathlete	Nation	Swimming	T1	Cycling	T2	Running	Total	Difference
1st place, gold medalist(s)	27	Solveig Løvseth	Norway	20:43	1:00	1:00:17	0:30	34:38	1:57:05	
2nd place, silver medalist(s)	5	Julia Hauser	Austria	20:38	0:57	1:00:30	0:31	34:41	1:57:15	+0:10
3rd place, bronze medalist(s)	22	Jolien Vermeylen	Belgium	19:35	0:57	1:01:43	0:26	34:38	1:57:17	+0:12
4	15	Selina Klamt	Germany	19:43	0:57	1:01:21	0:30	34:58	1:57:27	+0:22
5	3	Audrey Merle	France	20:45	0:58	1:00:20	0:31	34:56	1:57:28	+0:23
6	55	Jule Behrens	Germany	20:42	0:58	1:00:26	0:33	34:53	1:57:30	+0:25
7	1	Verena Steinhauser	Italy	19:46	0:59	1:01:15	0:33	34:59	1:57:30	+0:25
8	10	Mathilde Gautier	France	19:20	0:56	1:01:47	0:29	35:05	1:57:35	+0:30
9	46	Alice Betto	Italy	19:41	0:58	1:01:27	0:29	35:03	1:57:36	+0:31
10	18	Alissa König	Switzerland	20:44	0:54	1:00:23	0:29	35:15	1:57:43	+0:38
11	7	Sian Rainsley	Great Britain	19:47	0:56	1:01:18	0:30	35:42	1:58:12	+1:07
12	23	Zuzana Michaličková	Slovakia	19:44	0:54	1:01:28	0:32	35:40	1:58:16	+1:11
13	16	Barbara de Koning	Netherlands	19:42	0:59	1:01:34	0:30	35:40	1:58:23	+1:18
14	19	Nora Gmür	Switzerland	20:38	0:55	1:00:27	0:29	36:40	1:59:07	+2:02
15	39	Márta Kropkó	Hungary	19:35	0:57	1:01:41	0:34	36:31	1:59:16	+2:11
16	31	Sara Guerrero	Spain	19:39	1:00	1:01:37	0:30	36:42	1:59:27	+2:22
17	52	Tjaša Vrtačič	Slovenia	20:42	0:58	1:00:22	0:27	37:10	1:59:36	+2:31
18	30	Sophie Alden	Great Britain	19:19	0:58	1:01:48	0:30	37:54	2:00:27	+3:22
19	28	Cecilia Santamaría	Spain	19:40	0:58	1:01:26	0:31	38:01	2:00:33	+3:28 1P
20	45	Magdalena Sudak	Poland	20:43	0:56	1:00:24	0:29	38:10	2:00:40	+3:35
21	2	Alberte Kjær Pedersen	Denmark	20:44	0:55	1:03:40	0:27	35:36	2:01:20	+4:15
22	24	Anna Godoy	Spain	19:42	0:54	1:05:40	0:32	35:25	2:02:11	+5:06 1P
23	26	Angelica Prestia	Italy	20:39	0:59	1:03:46	0:48	36:09	2:02:19	+5:14
24	43	Julia Bröcker	Germany	20:59	0:56	1:04:15	0:30	35:45	2:02:22	+5:17
25	12	Petra Kuříková	Czech Republic	20:40	1:01	1:03:40	0:29	36:55	2:02:44	+5:39
26	56	Józefina Młynarska	Poland	20:50	0:54	1:03:38	0:33	36:58	2:02:51	+5:46
27	42	Erin McConnell	Ireland	19:40	1:00	1:03:22	0:33	38:33	2:03:06	+6:01
28	57	Hollie Elliott	Great Britain	20:43	0:59	1:03:39	0:30	37:29	2:03:18	+6:13
29	47	Kaidi Kivioja	Estonia	21:38	0:57	1:03:38	0:32	36:55	2:03:37	+6:32
30	11	Ivana Kuriačková	Slovakia	20:41	0:59	1:04:34	0:32	37:07	2:03:50	+6:45
31	33	Noémi Sárszegi	Hungary	21:39	0:58	1:03:35	0:31	37:18	2:03:58	+6:53
32	17	Paulina Klimas	Poland	20:48	1:04	1:04:31	0:36	37:05	2:04:02	+6:57
33	21	Tereza Zimovjanová	Czech Republic	20:54	1:02	1:04:20	0:28	37:31	2:04:13	+7:08
34	49	Alžběta Hrušková	Czech Republic	21:04	0:56	1:04:15	0:33	37:40	2:04:25	+7:20
35	41	Sofiya Pryyma	Ukraine	21:36	1:00	1:03:34	0:30	38:07	2:04:45	+7:40
36	25	Romana Gajdošová	Slovakia	20:56	0:55	1:04:19	0:31	38:16	2:04:55	+7:50
37	14	Xisca Tous	Turkey	20:36	0:58	1:04:52	0:31	38:15	2:05:11	+8:06
38	48	Rebecca Beti	Switzerland	21:41	0:56	1:03:36	0:33	39:04	2:05:49	+8:44 2P
39	32	Maryna Kyryk	Ukraine	20:24	0:59	1:04:55	0:31	39:21	2:06:09	+9:04
40	34	Sara Vilic	Austria	19:46	0:57	1:05:31	0:32	40:00	2:06:43	+9:38
41	36	Marit van den Berg	Netherlands	21:45	1:01	1:07:52	0:28	40:00	2:11:05	+14:00
	38	Lotte Miller	Norway	20:41	1:01	1:00:24	0:42	Did not finish		
	35	Anna Holm Baumeister	Denmark	19:43	0:58	1:01:26	0:38	Did not finish		
	9	Sandra Dodet	France	20:34	Did not finish					
	29	Antoanela Manac	Romania	21:46	1:01	Lapped				
	37	Kseniia Levkovska	Ukraine	21:47	1:02	Lapped				
	53	Baiba Medne	Latvia	24:14	1:05	Lapped				
	54	Unė Narkūnaitė	Lithuania	24:58	1:00	Lapped				
	51	Carolyn Hayes	Ireland	Did not start						
