= Triathlon at the 2023 European Games – Mixed relay =

Mixed relay at the 2023 European Games
- Venue: Nowa Huta Lake
- Date: 1 July
- Competitors: 60 from 15 nations
- Teams: 15
- Winning time: 1:07:29

Medalists
gold medal	Vetle Bergsvik Thorn; Lotte Miller; Casper Stornes; Solveig Løvseth	Norway
silver medal	Barclay Izzard; Sophie Alden; Connor Bentley; Sian Rainsley	Great Britain
bronze medal	Gergely Kiss; Zsanett Bragmayer; Gergő Dobi; Márta Kropkó	Hungary

The triathlon mixed at the 2023 European Games, in Kraków, was held on 1 July 2023. A total of 16 teams of four athletes each, two men and two women running in the male - female - male - female format will compete over the super-sprint relay distance. This will be the first appearance of triathlon mixed relay in the European Games program. Both the reigning Olympic and World Champions at mixed relay, Great Britain and France, are set to start : both have already qualified for the event in Paris 2024.

== Schedule ==
Date	Event	Time (local)
1 July 2023	Mixed relay	10:00 a.m.
1 July 2023	Medal ceremony	12:20 p.m.

== Current champions ==
This will be the first European Games mixed relay event. The current Olympic, World and Continental champions are as follows:

Event	Current champion	Venue	Year
Olympic Games Mixed relay (F - M - F - M)	Great Britain; Jess Learmonth; Jonathan Brownlee; Georgia Taylor-Brown; Alex Yee	Tokyo, Japan	2020
World Triathlon Mixed Relay Championships (M - F - M - F)	FRA; Pierre Le Corre; Emma Lombardi; Vincent Luis; Cassandre Beaugrand	Montréal, Canada	2022
European Triathlon Mixed Relay Championships (M - F - M - F)	FRA; Léo Bergere; Emma Lombardi; Dorian Coninx; Cassandre Beaugrand	Munich, Germany	2022

== Qualification ==
The fifty-four highest ranked athletes per sex on the Europe Triathlon Ranking as of 3 May 2023 are allocated one quota place for their NOC, respecting the maximum quota allocation of three per NOC per event. In case the NOC already obtained the quotas, they will not be allocated these quota places. Any nation which qualifies two men and two women will be eligible for the team event.

Following the individual qualification, any team with two men and two women in individual events qualifies for the mixed relay. In this case, 16 teams so qualified.

== Paris 2024 qualification ==
Triathlon is one of the events where performance in the 2023 Games impacts indirectly on Olympic qualification, by way of ranking points.

== Results ==
Triathlon Europe confirmed the following teams for the event on 7 June 2023. Full lineups will be announced on the day of the race.

Rank	Team	#	Triathlete	Swimming	T1	Cycling	T2	Running	Leg time	Total time	Difference
1st place, gold medalist(s)	Norway	11/A	Vetle Bergsvik Thorn	3:44	0:30	7:02	0:23	4:08	15:45	1:07:29	
1st place, gold medalist(s)	Norway	11/B	Lotte Miller	4:11	0:32	7:41	0:28	4:47	17:47	1:07:29	
1st place, gold medalist(s)	Norway	11/C	Casper Stornes	3:48	0:30	6:54	0:28	4:08	15:57	1:07:29	
1st place, gold medalist(s)	Norway	11/D	Solveig Løvseth	4:24	0:32	7:22	0:29	5:08	18:03	1:07:29	
2nd place, silver medalist(s)	Great Britain	1/A	Barclay Izzard	3:52	0:26	7:01	0:29	4:17	16:04	1:07:33	+0:04
2nd place, silver medalist(s)	Great Britain	1/B	Sophie Alden	3:59	0:31	7:36	0:29	4:59	17:41	1:07:33	+0:04
2nd place, silver medalist(s)	Great Britain	1/C	Connor Bentley	3:39	0:31	6:59	0:27	4:11	15:56	1:07:33	+0:04
2nd place, silver medalist(s)	Great Britain	1/D	Sian Rainsley	4:06	0:30	7:30	0:29	5:10	17:54	1:07:33	+0:04
3rd place, bronze medalist(s)	Hungary	8/A	Gergely Kiss	3:36	0:30	7:13	0:27	4:16	15:59	1:07:40	+0:11
3rd place, bronze medalist(s)	Hungary	8/B	Zsanett Bragmayer	4:00	0:30	7:39	0:25	4:42	17:24	1:07:40	+0:11
3rd place, bronze medalist(s)	Hungary	8/C	Gergő Dobi	3:44	0:29	7:20	0:24	4:14	16:20	1:07:40	+0:11
3rd place, bronze medalist(s)	Hungary	8/D	Márta Kropkó	4:06	0:32	7:32	0:26	5:15	17:59	1:07:40	+0:11
4	Switzerland	4/A	Adrien Briffod	3:52	0:26	7:00	0:23	4:04	15:42	1:07:47	+0:18 1P
4	Switzerland	4/B	Alissa König	4:16	0:30	7:53	0:26	4:51	18:05	1:07:47	+0:18 1P
4	Switzerland	4/C	Sylvain Fridelance	3:43	0:28	6:56	0:27	4:17	16:00	1:07:47	+0:18 1P
4	Switzerland	4/D	Nora Gmür	4:04	0:30	7:30	0:25	5:23	18:02	1:07:47	+0:18 1P
5	Spain	7/A	David Cantero	3:54	0:29	7:12	0:25	4:10	16:09	1:07:54	+0:25 1P
5	Spain	7/B	Sara Guerrero	4:01	0:32	7:42	0:28	4:48	17:40	1:07:54	+0:25 1P
5	Spain	7/C	Alberto González	3:44	0:28	6:51	0:24	4:12	15:48	1:07:54	+0:25 1P
5	Spain	7/D	Cecilia Santamaría	4:06	0:31	7:39	0:29	5:25	18:19	1:07:54	+0:25 1P
6	Italy	5/A	Michele Sarzilla	3:39	0:30	7:09	0:28	4:17	16:00	1:08:01	+0:32
6	Italy	5/B	Angelica Prestia	4:08	0:37	7:30	0:28	4:39	17:30	1:08:01	+0:32
6	Italy	5/C	Gianluca Pozzatti	3:40	0:28	7:06	0:27	4:18	16:08	1:08:01	+0:32
6	Italy	5/D	Verena Steinhauser	4:14	0:30	7:32	0:31	5:30	18:24	1:08:01	+0:32
7	Denmark	6/A	Emil Holm	3:54	0:28	7:03	0:26	4:26	16:15	1:08:34	+1:05 1P
7	Denmark	6/B	Alberte Kjær Pedersen	4:06	0:27	7:33	0:25	4:34	17:13	1:08:34	+1:05 1P
7	Denmark	6/C	Oscar Gladney Rundqvist	3:50	0:26	7:09	0:26	4:11	16:12	1:08:34	+1:05 1P
7	Denmark	6/D	Anna Holm Baumeister	4:10	0:30	7:33	0:37	5:57	18:56	1:08:34	+1:05 1P
8	France	2/A	Yanis Seguin	3:54	0:26	7:14	0:24	4:17	16:13	1:08:47	+1:18
8	France	2/B	Mathilde Gautier	3:52	0:31	7:46	0:30	4:46	17:34	1:08:47	+1:18
8	France	2/C	Valentin Morlec	3:34	0:28	7:06	0:29	4:49	16:35	1:08:47	+1:18
8	France	2/D	Audrey Merle	4:12	0:33	7:55	0:28	5:09	18:27	1:08:47	+1:18
9	Austria	12/A	Lukas Pertl	3:54	0:30	7:11	0:24	4:22	16:19	1:09:18	+1:49
9	Austria	12/B	Julia Hauser	4:08	0:31	8:10	0:31	4:48	18:17	1:09:18	+1:49
9	Austria	12/C	Alois Knabl	3:40	0:31	7:01	0:26	4:20	16:06	1:09:18	+1:49
9	Austria	12/D	Sara Vilic	4:13	0:28	8:12	0:25	5:11	18:38	1:09:18	+1:49
10	Slovakia	16/A	Peter Rojtáš	3:47	0:28	7:03	0:27	4:35	16:18	1:09:19	+1:50
10	Slovakia	16/B	Margaréta Vráblová	4:07	0:30	8:15	0:29	4:46	18:14	1:09:19	+1:50
10	Slovakia	16/C	Richard Varga	3:42	0:30	7:11	0:28	4:22	16:21	1:09:19	+1:50
10	Slovakia	16/D	Zuzana Michaličková	4:03	0:30	8:08	0:26	5:12	18:27	1:09:19	+1:50
11	Luxembourg	15/A	Gregor Payet	3:48	0:28	7:01	0:24	4:22	16:01	1:09:21	+1:52
11	Luxembourg	15/B	Jeanne Lehair	4:00	0:30	7:45	0:26	4:30	17:20	1:09:21	+1:52
11	Luxembourg	15/C	Lucas Cambresy	3:52	0:27	7:42	0:29	4:43	17:20	1:09:21	+1:52
11	Luxembourg	15/D	Eva Daniëls	4:17	0:35	8:01	0:27	5:12	18:42	1:09:21	+1:52
12	Poland	14/A	Michał Oliwa	3:40	0:28	7:10	0:26	4:17	15:59	1:09:26	+1:57
12	Poland	14/B	Magdalena Sudak	4:14	0:29	7:51	0:31	4:57	18:08	1:09:26	+1:57
12	Poland	14/C	Maciej Bruździak	3:47	0:27	7:20	0:26	4:24	16:33	1:09:26	+1:57
12	Poland	14/D	Józefina Młynarska	4:23	0:31	8:02	0:30	5:14	18:48	1:09:26	+1:57
13	Germany	3/A	Jonas Osterholt	3:45	0:28	7:04	0:25	4:11	15:51	1:09:52	+2:23
13	Germany	3/B	Selina Klamt	4:08	0:30	8:39	0:29	4:53	18:47	1:09:52	+2:23
13	Germany	3/C	Simon Henseleit	3:40	0:27	7:01	0:25	4:07	15:48	1:09:52	+2:23
13	Germany	3/D	Jule Behrens	4:25	0:33	8:13	0:30	5:38	19:27	1:09:52	+2:23
14	Ireland	17/A	James Edgar	3:45	0:28	7:06	0:25	4:07	15:50	1:10:57	+3:28
14	Ireland	17/B	Erin McConnell	4:07	0:34	7:46	0:28	4:57	18:01	1:10:57	+3:28
14	Ireland	17/C	Luke McCarron	3:45	0:34	7:40	0:29	4:28	17:05	1:10:57	+3:28
14	Ireland	17/D	Carolyn Hayes	4:29	0:31	8:40	0:25	5:49	20:02	1:10:57	+3:28
15	Czech Republic	10/A	Tomáš Zikmund	3:45	0:29	7:05	0:26	4:21	16:05	1:11:12	+3:43
15	Czech Republic	10/B	Alžběta Hrušková	4:08	0:33	8:10	0:27	5:16	18:42	1:11:12	+3:43
15	Czech Republic	10/C	Tomáš Kříž	3:55	0:32	7:38	0:28	4:30	17:11	1:11:12	+3:43
15	Czech Republic	10/D	Tereza Zimovjanová	4:35	0:32	8:03	0:25	5:31	19:16	1:11:12	+3:43
	Netherlands	9/A	Mitch Kolkman	Did not start							
	Netherlands	9/B	Barbara de Koning	Did not start							
	Netherlands	9/C	Donald Hillebregt	Did not start							
	Netherlands	9/D	Marit van den Berg	Did not start							
