= Triathlon at the 2023 European Games – Men's individual =

Men's individual at the 2023 European Games
- Venue: Nowa Huta Lake
- Date: 28 June
- Competitors: 58 from 27 nations
- Winning time: 1:46:50

Medalists
gold medal	Vetle Bergsvik Thorn	Norway
silver medal	Shachar Sagiv	Israel
bronze medal	Adrien Briffod	Switzerland

The triathlon individual race for men at the 2023 European Games, in Kraków, was held on 28 June 2023. A total of 60 men competed over the 'standard' or 'Olympic' distance. This was the second appearance of triathlon in the European Games program after 2015. Neither the reigning champion, Gordon Benson of Great Britain, nor reigning European champion, David Castro Fajardo, started.

== Schedule ==
Date	Event	Time (local)
28 June 2003	Men's individual	10:00 a.m.
28 June 2003	Medal ceremony	12:20 p.m.

== Current champions ==
This will be the second European Games men's individual event. The current Olympic, World, Continental and European Games champions are as follows:

Event	Current champion	Venue	Year
Olympic Games	Kristian Blummenfelt (NOR)	(Japan) Tokyo	2020
World Triathlon Championships	Léo Bergere (FRA)	Various	2022
European Games	Gordon Benson (GBR)	(Azerbaijan) Baku	2015
European Triathlon Championships	David Castro (ESP)	(Spain) Madrid	2023

== Qualification ==
The fifty-four highest ranked athletes per sex on the Europe Triathlon Ranking as of 3 May 2023 are allocated one quota place for their NOC, respecting the maximum quota allocation of three per NOC per event. In case the NOC already obtained the quotas, they will not be allocated these quota places. Any nation which qualifies two men and two women will be eligible for the team event.

== Paris 2024 qualification ==
Triathlon is one of the events where performance in the 2023 Games impacts indirectly on Olympic qualification, by way of ranking points. The event will therefore be held over the Olympic distance; a 1500-metre swim, a 40 km bike ride and a 10 km run.

== Results ==
Triathlon Europe confirmed the following athletes for the event on 7 June 2023.

Rank	#	Triathlete	Nation	Swimming	T1	Cycling	T2	Running	Total	Difference
1st place, gold medalist(s)	8	Vetle Bergsvik Thorn	Norway	18:30	0:52	56:37	0:26	30:27	1:46:50	
2nd place, silver medalist(s)	6	Shachar Sagiv	Israel	19:02	0:54	56:03	0:26	30:27	1:46:51	+0:01
3rd place, bronze medalist(s)	2	Adrien Briffod	Switzerland	18:31	0:50	56:39	0:23	30:31	1:46:52	+0:02
4	22	Yanis Seguin	France	19:33	0:51	55:35	0:30	30:27	1:46:54	+0:04
5	53	Panagiotis Bitados	Greece	18:27	0:52	56:40	0:28	30:33	1:46:57	+0:07
6	9	Rostislav Pevtsov	Azerbaijan	18:41	0:53	56:29	0:28	30:29	1:46:58	+0:08
7	20	Simon Henseleit	Germany	18:24	0:49	56:44	0:24	30:42	1:47:02	+0:12
8	4	Gianluca Pozzatti	Italy	18:16	0:53	56:51	0:26	30:43	1:47:08	+0:18
9	7	Barclay Izzard	Great Britain	19:04	0:49	56:08	0:23	30:58	1:47:21	+0:31
10	1	Michele Sarzilla	Italy	18:33	0:52	56:33	0:25	31:04	1:47:25	+0:35
11	44	David Cantero	Spain	19:25	0:55	55:43	0:26	31:12	1:47:37	+0:47
12	26	Valentin Morlec	France	18:32	0:52	56:35	0:24	31:20	1:47:41	+0:51
13	48	Sergiy Polikarpenko	Italy	19:05	0:52	56:06	0:32	31:11	1:47:44	+0:54
14	10	Alberto González	Spain	18:23	0:53	56:57	0:26	31:08	1:47:45	+0:55
15	19	Emil Holm	Denmark	19:32	0:50	55:39	0:27	31:21	1:47:47	+0:57
16	15	Noah Servais	Belgium	18:28	0:52	56:42	0:27	31:23	1:47:50	+1:00
17	12	Paul Georgenthum	France	18:44	0:52	56:22	0:24	31:37	1:47:56	+1:06
18	62	Jonas Osterholt	Germany	18:35	0:52	56:33	0:29	31:56	1:48:23	+1:33
19	29	Cedric Osterholt	Germany	18:21	0:55	56:44	0:27	32:00	1:48:25	+1:35
20	27	Arnaud Mengal	Belgium	19:27	0:55	55:47	0:26	32:04	1:48:37	+1:47
21	40	Casper Stornes	Norway	18:37	0:56	56:28	0:25	32:20	1:48:44	+1:54
22	30	Lukas Pertl	Austria	19:22	0:50	56:17	0:27	31:53	1:48:48	+1:58
23	28	Gergely Kiss	Hungary	18:17	0:52	57:17	0:28	32:06	1:48:58	+2:08
24	57	Gergő Dobi	Hungary	18:18	0:51	57:06	0:26	32:27	1:49:06	+2:16
25	16	Leon Pauger	Austria	18:40	0:52	56:26	0:25	32:52	1:49:13	+2:23
26	23	Gregor Payet	Luxembourg	19:25	0:57	55:40	0:34	32:51	1:49:24	+2:34
27	32	Mitch Kolkman	Netherlands	18:15	0:51	57:43	0:29	32:22	1:49:38	+2:48
28	33	Michał Oliwa	Poland	18:23	0:54	56:48	0:27	33:13	1:49:44	+2:54
29	55	Sebastian Wernersen	Norway	19:04	0:53	56:02	0:24	33:26	1:49:47	+2:57
30	11	Alois Knabl	Austria	18:20	0:53	57:42	0:29	32:36	1:49:59	+3:09 1P
31	46	Henry Räppo	Estonia	18:32	0:52	56:39	0:27	33:43	1:50:11	+3:21
32	37	Connor Bentley	Great Britain	18:21	0:55	56:42	0:26	34:01	1:50:22	+3:32
33	18	Vitalii Vorontsov	Ukraine	19:34	0:52	57:07	0:26	32:29	1:50:26	+3:36
34	51	Johannes Sikk	Estonia	19:31	0:53	55:38	0:29	34:07	1:50:36	+3:46
35	45	Tomáš Zikmund	Czech Republic	19:03	0:58	56:14	0:29	33:59	1:50:40	+3:50
36	59	Ognjen Stojanović	Serbia	19:01	0:59	57:33	0:31	32:43	1:50:44	+3:54
37	41	Oscar Gladney Rundqvist	Denmark	19:34	0:53	56:08	0:26	33:59	1:50:59	+4:09
38	35	Hamish Reilly	Great Britain	18:28	0:51	58:13	0:29	33:07	1:51:06	+4:16
39	38	Jan Volár	Czech Republic	19:07	0:56	56:44	0:34	33:51	1:51:10	+4:20
40	3	Sylvain Fridelance	Switzerland	18:31	0:55	56:35	0:27	34:46	1:51:11	+4:21
41	21	James Edgar	Ireland	18:36	0:53	59:55	0:33	31:32	1:51:27	+4:37
42	56	Tomáš Kříž	Czech Republic	18:53	0:55	56:15	0:31	35:30	1:52:02	+5:12
43	31	Maciej Bruździak	Poland	18:40	0:52	56:47	0:29	35:49	1:52:35	+5:45
44	52	Artūrs Liepa	Latvia	19:02	0:52	57:38	0:28	34:43	1:52:42	+5:52
45	63	Kamil Kulik	Poland	19:45	0:53	1:00:08	0:27	32:09	1:53:20	+6:30
46	36	Mario Mola	Spain	19:35	0:52	1:00:22	0:29	32:04	1:53:21	+6:31
47	54	Luke McCarron	Ireland	19:29	0:56	1:00:25	0:30	32:21	1:53:38	+6:48
48	42	Gültigin Er	Turkey	18:39	0:55	57:24	0:40	36:22	1:53:57	+7:07
49	47	Itamar Levanon	Israel	20:03	0:53	59:52	0:31	33:31	1:54:48	+7:58
50	34	Donald Hillebregt	Netherlands	19:05	0:56	57:38	0:33	36:51	1:55:00	+8:10
51	49	Peter Rojtáš	Slovakia	18:26	0:50	1:00:02	0:39	35:45	1:55:41	+8:51
52	14	Felix Duchampt	Romania	19:29	0:52	1:00:30	0:30	40:14	2:01:33	+14:43
	24	Richard Varga	Slovakia	18:39	0:55	56:30	0:38	Did not finish		
	17	Bob Haller	Luxembourg	19:05	0:52	58:27	Did not finish			
	39	Zsombor Dévay	Hungary	18:33	0:53	Did not finish				
	61	Igor Kozlovskij	Lithuania	19:06	1:02	Lapped				
	43	Itamar Eshed	Israel	19:28	0:56	Lapped				
	58	Lukas Prokopavičius	Lithuania	22:12	0:52	Lapped				
