= Norway at the 2024 Summer Olympics =

- IOC code: NOR
- NOC: Norwegian Olympic Committee and Confederation of Sports
- Website: www.idrett.no (in Norwegian)

in Paris, France 26 July 2024 – 11 August 2024
- Competitors: 107 (56 men and 51 women) in 18 sports
- Flag bearers: Christian Sørum & Katrine Lunde
- Medals Ranked 18th: Gold 4 Silver 1 Bronze 3 Total 8

Summer Olympics appearances (overview)
- 1900; ~~1904~~; 1908; 1912; 1920; 1924; 1928; 1932; 1936; 1948; 1952; 1956; 1960; 1964; 1968; 1972; 1976; 1980; 1984; 1988; 1992; 1996; 2000; 2004; 2008; 2012; 2016; 2020; 2024; 2028

Other related appearances
- 1906 Intercalated Games

Norway competed at the 2024 Summer Olympics in Paris from 26 July to 11 August 2024. Norwegian athletes have appeared in every edition of the Summer Olympic Games, except for the 1980 Summer Olympics in Moscow because of the country's support for the United States-led boycott.

== Medalists ==
| Medal | Name | Sport | Event | Date |
|---|---|---|---|---|
| Gold | Markus Rooth | Athletics | Men's decathlon | 3 August |
| Gold | Norway women's national handball team: Kristine Breistøl; Kari Brattset Dale; Thale Rushfeldt Deila; Camilla Herrem; Vilde Ingstad; Marit Røsberg Jacobsen; Veronica Kristiansen; Katrine Lunde; Nora Mørk; Stine Bredal Oftedal; Henny Reistad; Stine Skogrand; Sanna Solberg-Isaksen; Silje Solberg-Østhassel; Maren Nyland Aardahl | Handball | Women's tournament | 10 August |
| Gold | Solfrid Koanda | Weightlifting | Women's 81 kg | 10 August |
| Gold | Jakob Ingebrigtsen | Athletics | Men's 5000 m | 10 August |
| Silver | Karsten Warholm | Athletics | Men's 400 m hurdles | 9 August |
| Bronze | Line Flem Høst | Sailing | ILCA 6 | 7 August |
| Bronze | Anders Mol; Christian Sørum | Volleyball | Men's Beach | 10 August |
| Bronze | Grace Bullen | Wrestling | Women's freestyle 62 kg | 10 August |

== Competitors ==
The following is the list of number of competitors in the Games.

| Sport | Men | Women | Total |
|---|---|---|---|
| Athletics | 15 | 11 | 26 |
| Boxing | 1 | 1 | 2 |
| Canoeing | 0 | 4 | 4 |
| Cycling | 3 | 3 | 6 |
| Diving | 0 | 1 | 1 |
| Equestrian | 0 | 2 | 2 |
| Golf | 2 | 2 | 4 |
| Handball | 14 | 15 | 29 |
| Rowing | 8 | 2 | 10 |
| Sailing | 1 | 4 | 5 |
| Shooting | 3 | 3 | 6 |
| Swimming | 3 | 0 | 3 |
| Taekwondo | 1 | 0 | 1 |
| Tennis | 1 | 0 | 1 |
| Triathlon | 2 | 2 | 4 |
| Volleyball | 2 | 0 | 2 |
| Weightlifting | 0 | 1 | 1 |
| Wrestling | 0 | 1 | 1 |
| Total | 56 | 51 | 107 |

== Athletics ==
Norwegian track and field athletes achieved the entry standards for Paris 2024, either by passing the direct qualifying mark (or time for track and road races) or by world ranking, in the following events (a maximum of 3 athletes each):

Key

- Note–Ranks given for track events are within the athlete's heat only
- Q = Qualified for the next round
- q = Qualified for the next round as a fastest loser or, in field events, by position without achieving the qualifying target
- NR = National record
- N/A = Round not applicable for the event
- Bye = Athlete not required to compete in round

Track and road events

| Athlete | Event | Heat | | Repechage | | Semifinal | | Final | |
| Athlete | Event | Result | Rank | Result | Rank | Result | Rank | Result | Rank |
|---|---|---|---|---|---|---|---|---|---|
| Håvard Bentdal Ingvaldsen | Men's 400 m | 45.46 | 3 Q | Bye | | 45.60 | 7 | Did not advance | |
| Tobias Grønstad | Men's 800 m | 1:46.85 | 6 R | 1:44.57 | 3 q | 1:46.37 | 7 | Did not advance | |
| Narve Gilje Nordås | Men's 1500 m | 3:36.41 | 3 Q | Bye | | 3:32.34 | 6 Q | 3:30.46 SB | 7 |
| Jakob Ingebrigtsen | Men's 1500 m | 3:37.04 | 3 Q | Bye | | 3:32.38 | 1 Q | 3:28.24 | 4 |
| Jakob Ingebrigtsen | Men's 5000 m | 13:51.59 | 1 Q | —N/a | | | | 13:13.66 SB | 1st place, gold medalist(s) |
| Narve Gilje Nordås | Men's 5000 m | 14:08.16 | 1 Q | —N/a | | | | 13:31.34 | 17 |
| Karsten Warholm | Men's 400 m hurdles | 47.57 | 1 Q | Bye | | 47.67 | 1 Q | 47.06 | 2nd place, silver medalist(s) |
| Zerei Kbrom Mezngi | Men's marathon | —N/a | | | | | | 2:14:14 | 52 |
| Sondre Nordstad Moen | Men's marathon | —N/a | | | | | | 2:11:39 SB | 32 |
| Henriette Jæger | Women's 400 m | 50.39 | 3 Q | Bye | | 50.17 | 3 q | 49.96 | 8 |
| Amalie Iuel | Women's 400 m hurdles | 54.82 | 3 Q | Bye | | 54.88 | 5 | Did not advance | |
| Line Kloster | Women's 400 m hurdles | 57.69 | 7 R | 56.73 | 5 | Did not advance | | | |
| Karoline Bjerkeli Grøvdal | Women's 5000 m | 15:01.14 | 4 Q | —N/a | | | | 14:43.21 | 8 |
| Josefine Tomine Eriksen; Lakeri Ertzgaard; Amalie Iuel; Henriette Jæger; Elisabeth Slettum | Women's 4 × 400 m relay | 3:28.61 | 6 | —N/a | | | | Did not advance | |

Field events

| Athlete | Event | Qualification | | Final | |
| Athlete | Event | Distance | Position | Distance | Position |
|---|---|---|---|---|---|
| Sondre Guttormsen | Men's pole vault | 5.75 | 1 Q | 5.80 | 8 |
| Simen Guttormsen | Men's pole vault | 5.60 | 15 | Did not advance | |
| Pål Haugen Lillefosse | Men's pole vault | DNS | | Did not advance | |
| Marcus Thomsen | Men's shot put | 20.81 | 12 q | 20.67 | 9 |
| Eivind Henriksen | Men's hammer throw | 77.14 SB | 5 Q | 79.18 SB | 4 |
| Thomas Mardal | Men's hammer throw | 76.78 | 8 q | 74.25 | 11 |
| Lene Onsrud Retzius | Women's pole vault | 4.40 | 12 q | 4.40 | 18 |
| Beatrice Nedberge Llano | Women's hammer throw | 66.92 | 27 | Did not advance | |
| Marie-Therese Obst | Women's javelin throw | 61.82 | 10 q | 61.14 | 11 |

Combined events – Men's decathlon

| Athlete | Event | 100 m | LJ | SP | HJ | 400 m | 110H | DT | PV | JT | 1500 m | Final | Rank |
|---|---|---|---|---|---|---|---|---|---|---|---|---|---|
| Markus Rooth | Result | 10.71 | 7.80 | 15.25 | 1.99 | 47.69 | 14.25 | 49.80 | 5.30 | 66.87 | 4:39.56 | 8796 | 1st place, gold medalist(s) |
| Markus Rooth | Points | 926 | 1010 | 805 | 794 | 924 | 942 | 866 | 1004 | 842 | 683 | 8796 | 1st place, gold medalist(s) |
| Sander Skotheim | Result | 10.78 | 8.03 | 14.31 | 2.11 | 47.02 | 14.15 | 45.77 | NM | 59.79 | 4:37.49 | 7757 | 18 |
| Sander Skotheim | Points | 910 | 1068 | 747 | 906 | 957 | 955 | 783 | 0 | 735 | 696 | 7757 | 18 |

== Boxing ==
Norway entered two boxer into the Olympic tournament. Omar Shiha (men's super heavyweight) and Sunniva Hofstad (women's middleweight) qualified themself to Paris 2024, by winning the quota bouts round, in their respective division, at the 2024 World Olympic Qualification Tournament 1 in Busto Arsizio, Italy.

| Athlete | Event | Round of 16 | Quarterfinals | Semifinals | Final | |
| Athlete | Event | Opposition Result | Opposition Result | Opposition Result | Opposition Result | Rank |
|---|---|---|---|---|---|---|
| Omar Shiha | Men's +92 kg | Jalolov (UZB); L 0–5 | Did not advance | | | 9 |
| Sunniva Hofstad | Women's 75 kg | Borgohain (IND); L 0–5 | Did not advance | | | 9 |

== Canoeing ==
=== Sprint ===
Norwegian canoeists qualified one boats in the following distances for the Games through the 2023 ICF Canoe Sprint World Championships in Duisburg, Germany.

| Athlete | Event | Heats | | Quarterfinals | | Semifinals | | Final | |
| Athlete | Event | Time | Rank | Time | Rank | Time | Rank | Time | Rank |
|---|---|---|---|---|---|---|---|---|---|
| Kristine Strand Amundsen; Hedda Øritsland; Anna Margrete Sletsjøe; Maria Virik | Women's K-4 500 m | 1:34.28 | 4 SF | —N/a | | 1:34.77 | 2 FA | 1:35.02 | 7 |

Qualification Legend: FA = Qualify to final (medal); FB = Qualify to final B (non-medal)

== Cycling ==
=== Road ===
Norway entered four road cyclists (two male and two female). Norway qualified two male and two female through the UCI Nation Ranking and 2023 World Championships in Glasgow, Great Britain.

Men

| Athlete | Event | Time | Rank |
|---|---|---|---|
| Søren Wærenskjold | Road race | 6:39:27 | 63 |
| Tobias Foss | Road race | 6:41:17 | 74 |
| Tobias Foss | Time trial | 37:57.28 | 13 |
| Søren Wærenskjold | Time trial | Did not finish | |

Women

| Athlete | Event | Time | Rank |
|---|---|---|---|
| Marte Berg Edseth | Road race | 4:04:23 | 30 |
| Ingvild Gaskjenn | Road race | 4:04:23 | 21 |

=== Track ===
Norway entered one rider to compete in the women's omnium events, based on the nations performances, through the final UCI Olympic rankings.

Omnium

| Athlete | Event | Scratch race | | Tempo race | | Elimination race | | Points race | | Total | |
| Athlete | Event | Rank | Points | Rank | Points | Rank | Points | Rank | Points | Rank | Points |
|---|---|---|---|---|---|---|---|---|---|---|---|
| Anita Stenberg | Women's omnium | 8 | 26 | 12 | 18 | 5 | 32 | 8 | 26 | 8 | 102 |

=== Mountain biking ===
Norwegian mountain bikers secured one men quota place for the Olympic through the release of the final Olympic mountain biking rankings.

| Athlete | Event | Time | Rank |
|---|---|---|---|
| Knut Røhme | Men's cross-country | 1:30:55 | 20 |

== Diving ==
Norway entered one diver, Helle Tuxen, into the Olympic competition.

| Athlete | Event | Preliminary | | Semifinal | | Final | |
| Athlete | Event | Points | Rank | Points | Rank | Points | Rank |
|---|---|---|---|---|---|---|---|
| Helle Tuxen | Women's 3 m springboard | 257.10 | 23 | Did not advance | | | |

== Equestrian ==
Norway entered two riders, each in the dressage and jumping events, through the establishments of final olympics ranking for Group A (North Western Europe).

=== Dressage ===
| Athlete | Horse | Event | Grand Prix | | Grand Prix Freestyle | | Overall | |
| Athlete | Horse | Event | Score | Rank | Technical | Artistic | Score | Rank |
|---|---|---|---|---|---|---|---|---|
| Isabel Freese | Total Hope OLD | Individual | 76.817 | 9 | 76.071 | 90.029 | 83.050 | 10 |

Qualification Legend: Q = Qualified for the final based on position in group; q = Qualified for the final based on overall position

=== Jumping ===
| Athlete | Horse | Event | Qualification | | Final | | |
| Athlete | Horse | Event | Penalties | Rank | Penalties | Time | Rank |
|---|---|---|---|---|---|---|---|
| Victoria Gulliksen | Mistral van de Vogelzang | Individual | 0.00 | 1 Q | 13.00 | 84.83 | 24 |

== Golf ==
Norway entered four golfers into the Olympic tournament. All of them qualified directly for the games, based on their respective world ranking performances, on the IGF World Rankings.

| Athlete | Event | Round 1 | Round 2 | Round 3 | Round 4 | Total | | |
| Athlete | Event | Score | Score | Score | Score | Score | Par | Rank |
|---|---|---|---|---|---|---|---|---|
| Viktor Hovland | Men's | 70 | 75 | 67 | 68 | 280 | −4 | T30 |
| Kristoffer Ventura | Men's | 71 | 68 | 76 | 69 | 284 | E | T43 |
| Celine Borge | Women's | 71 | 73 | 75 | 71 | 290 | +2 | T29 |
| Madelene Stavnar | Women's | 76 | 73 | 76 | 75 | 300 | +12 | T44 |

== Handball ==
Summary

Key:

- ET: After extra time
- P – Match decided by penalty-shootout.

| Team | Event | Group Stage | | | | | | Quarterfinal | Semifinal | Final / BM | |
| Team | Event | Opposition Score | Opposition Score | Opposition Score | Opposition Score | Opposition Score | Rank | Opposition Score | Opposition Score | Opposition Score | Rank |
|---|---|---|---|---|---|---|---|---|---|---|---|
| Norway men's | Men's tournament | Argentina; W 36–31 | France; W 27–22 | Hungary; W 26–25 | Egypt; L 25–26 | Denmark; L 25–32 | 3 Q | Slovenia; L 28–33 | Did not advance | | 6 |
| Norway women's | Women's tournament | Sweden; L 28–32 | Denmark; W 27–18 | South Korea; W 26–20 | Slovenia; W 29–22 | Germany; W 30–18 | 1 Q | Brazil; W 32–15 | Denmark; W 25–21 | France; W 29–21 | 1st place, gold medalist(s) |

=== Men's tournament ===
Norway men's national handball team qualified for the Olympics by finishing in the top two at the 2024 IHF Men's Olympic Qualification Tournaments in Tatabánya, Hungary.

Team roster

The squad was announced on 3 July 2024.

Head coach: Jonas Wille

| No. | Pos. | Name | Date of birth (age) | Height | App. | Goals | Club |
|---|---|---|---|---|---|---|---|
| 3 | DF | Vetle Eck Aga | 4 October 1993 (aged 30) | 1.90 m | 51 | 4 | (Norway) Kolstad Håndball |
| 5 | CB | Sander Sagosen | 14 September 1995 (aged 28) | 1.95 m | 168 | 839 | (Norway) Kolstad Håndball |
| 6 | LW | Sebastian Barthold | 27 August 1991 (aged 32) | 1.85 m | 85 | 229 | (Denmark) Aalborg Håndbold |
| 11 | P | Petter Øverby | 26 March 1992 (aged 32) | 2.00 m | 138 | 144 | (Germany) THW Kiel |
| 12 | GK | Kristian Sæverås | 22 June 1996 (aged 28) | 1.95 m | 88 | 3 | (Germany) SC DHfK Leipzig |
| 19 | RW | Kristian Bjørnsen | 10 January 1989 (aged 35) | 1.91 m | 198 | 714 | (Denmark) Aalborg Håndbold |
| 21 | P | Magnus Gullerud | 13 November 1991 (aged 32) | 1.94 m | 191 | 291 | (Norway) Kolstad Håndball |
| 22 | CB | Tobias Grøndahl | 22 January 2001 (aged 23) | 1.84 m | 35 | 84 | (Denmark) GOG Håndbold |
| 24 | CB | Christian O'Sullivan | 22 August 1991 (aged 32) | 1.90 m | 192 | 295 | (Germany) SC Magdeburg |
| 27 | RB | Harald Reinkind | 17 August 1992 (aged 31) | 1.97 m | 169 | 363 | (Germany) THW Kiel |
| 30 | GK | Torbjørn Bergerud | 16 July 1994 (aged 30) | 2.00 m | 144 | 0 | (Norway) Kolstad Håndball |
| 42 | RB | Gabriel Setterblom | 22 November 1997 (aged 26) | 1.92 m | 10 | 16 | (Denmark) SønderjyskE |
| 43 | LB | Simen Lyse | 1 February 2000 (aged 24) | 1.95 m | 18 | 44 | (Norway) Kolstad Håndball |
| 71 | LW | Alexander Blonz | 17 April 2000 (aged 24) | 1.89 m | 86 | 221 | (Denmark) GOG Håndbold |

Group play

| Pos | Team | Pld | W | D | L | GF | GA | GD | Pts | Qualification |
|---|---|---|---|---|---|---|---|---|---|---|
| 1 | Denmark | 5 | 5 | 0 | 0 | 165 | 133 | +32 | 10 | Quarterfinals |
| 2 | Egypt | 5 | 3 | 1 | 1 | 148 | 140 | +8 | 7 | Quarterfinals |
| 3 | Norway | 5 | 3 | 0 | 2 | 139 | 136 | +3 | 6 | Quarterfinals |
| 4 | France (H) | 5 | 2 | 1 | 2 | 129 | 131 | −2 | 5 | Quarterfinals |
| 5 | Hungary | 5 | 1 | 0 | 4 | 137 | 138 | −1 | 2 | |
| 6 | Argentina | 5 | 0 | 0 | 5 | 131 | 171 | −40 | 0 | |

Source: Olympics Paris 2024 rankings
Rules for classification: 1) Points; 2) Head-to-head points; 3) Head-to-head goal difference; 4) Head-to-head goals scored; 5) Goal difference; 6) Goals scored; 7) Draw.
(H) Hosts

| 27 July 2024; 16:00 | Norway | 36–31 | Argentina | Paris Expo Porte de Versailles, Paris; Attendance: 5,749; Referees: Horáček, Novotný (CZE) |
| 27 July 2024; 16:00 | Grøndahl 8 | (22–15) | D. Simonet 5 | Paris Expo Porte de Versailles, Paris; Attendance: 5,749; Referees: Horáček, Novotný (CZE) |
| 27 July 2024; 16:00 | 1× (red card) | Report | 3× (suspension) | Paris Expo Porte de Versailles, Paris; Attendance: 5,749; Referees: Horáček, Novotný (CZE) |

| 29 July 2024; 19:00 | France | 22–27 | Norway | Paris Expo Porte de Versailles, Paris; Attendance: 5,602; Referees: García, Marín (ESP) |
| 29 July 2024; 19:00 | Mem 10 | (11–16) | Blonz 7 | Paris Expo Porte de Versailles, Paris; Attendance: 5,602; Referees: García, Marín (ESP) |
| 29 July 2024; 19:00 | 1× (yellow card) 1× (suspension) | Report | 2× (suspension) | Paris Expo Porte de Versailles, Paris; Attendance: 5,602; Referees: García, Marín (ESP) |

| 31 July 2024; 09:00 | Norway | 26–25 | Hungary | Paris Expo Porte de Versailles, Paris; Attendance: 5,774; Referees: Lah, Sok (SLO) |
| 31 July 2024; 09:00 | Blonz 9 | (11–13) | three players 6 | Paris Expo Porte de Versailles, Paris; Attendance: 5,774; Referees: Lah, Sok (SLO) |
| 31 July 2024; 09:00 | 4× (suspension) | Report | 3× (suspension) | Paris Expo Porte de Versailles, Paris; Attendance: 5,774; Referees: Lah, Sok (SLO) |

| 2 August 2024; 21:00 | Norway | 25–26 | Egypt | Paris Expo Porte de Versailles, Paris; Attendance: 5,652; Referees: Schulze, Tönnies (GER) |
| 2 August 2024; 21:00 | Reinkind 7 | (13–14) | Omar 7 | Paris Expo Porte de Versailles, Paris; Attendance: 5,652; Referees: Schulze, Tönnies (GER) |
| 2 August 2024; 21:00 | 2× (suspension) 1× (red card) | Report | 2× (suspension) | Paris Expo Porte de Versailles, Paris; Attendance: 5,652; Referees: Schulze, Tönnies (GER) |

| 4 August 2024; 19:00 | Denmark | 32–25 | Norway | Paris Expo Porte de Versailles, Paris; Attendance: 5,723; Referees: Nachevski, Nikolov (MKD) |
| 4 August 2024; 19:00 | Pytlick 9 | (17–12) | Reinkind 6 | Paris Expo Porte de Versailles, Paris; Attendance: 5,723; Referees: Nachevski, Nikolov (MKD) |
| 4 August 2024; 19:00 | 2× (yellow card) 3× (suspension) | Report | 4× (suspension) | Paris Expo Porte de Versailles, Paris; Attendance: 5,723; Referees: Nachevski, Nikolov (MKD) |

Quarterfinal

| 7 August 2024; 21:30 | Norway | 28–33 | Slovenia | Stade Pierre-Mauroy, Lille; Attendance: 26,406; Referees: García, Marín (ESP) |
| 7 August 2024; 21:30 | Blonz 7 | (12–16) | Vlah 11 | Stade Pierre-Mauroy, Lille; Attendance: 26,406; Referees: García, Marín (ESP) |
| 7 August 2024; 21:30 | 4× (suspension) | Report | 1× (yellow card) 1× (suspension) 1× (red card) | Stade Pierre-Mauroy, Lille; Attendance: 26,406; Referees: García, Marín (ESP) |

=== Women's tournament ===
Norway women's national handball team qualified for the Olympics by winning the gold medal and securing an outright berth at the final match of the 2022 European Championships in Ljubljana, Slovenia.

Team roster

A 15-player squad was announced on 3 July 2024. The final roster was revealed on 24 July. On 29 July, Henny Reistad replaced Thale Rushfeldt Deila and on 31 July, Thale Rushfeldt Deila replaced Nora Mørk.

Head coach: (Iceland) Þórir Hergeirsson

| No. | Pos. | Name | Date of birth (age) | Height | App. | Goals | Club |
|---|---|---|---|---|---|---|---|
| 4 | LB | Veronica Kristiansen | 10 July 1990 (aged 34) | 1.75 m | 179 | 573 | (Hungary) Győri ETO KC |
| 6 | P | Maren Nyland Aardahl | 2 March 1994 (aged 30) | 1.83 m | 52 | 94 | (Denmark) Odense Håndbold |
| 7 | RB | Stine Skogrand | 3 March 1993 (aged 31) | 1.73 m | 146 | 273 | (Denmark) Ikast Håndbold |
| 9 | RB | Nora Mørk | 5 April 1991 (aged 33) | 1.69 m | 185 | 893 | (Denmark) Team Esbjerg |
| 10 | CB | Stine Bredal Oftedal | 25 September 1991 (aged 32) | 1.68 m | 261 | 732 | Unattached |
| 12 | GK | Silje Solberg-Østhassel | 16 June 1990 (aged 34) | 1.78 m | 206 | 9 | (Norway) Vipers Kristiansand |
| 13 | P | Kari Brattset Dale | 15 February 1991 (aged 33) | 1.84 m | 124 | 316 | (Hungary) Győri ETO KC |
| 14 | LB | Kristine Breistøl | 23 August 1993 (aged 30) | 1.91 m | 80 | 120 | (Hungary) Győri ETO KC |
| 15 | P | Vilde Ingstad | 18 December 1994 (aged 29) | 1.80 m | 132 | 202 | (Romania) CSM București |
| 16 | GK | Katrine Lunde | 30 March 1980 (aged 44) | 1.81 m | 355 | 3 | (Norway) Vipers Kristiansand |
| 20 | RW | Marit Røsberg Jacobsen | 25 February 1994 (aged 30) | 1.65 m | 105 | 185 | (Denmark) Team Esbjerg |
| 23 | LW | Camilla Herrem | 8 October 1986 (aged 37) | 1.67 m | 310 | 901 | (Norway) Sola HK |
| 24 | LW | Sanna Solberg-Isaksen | 16 June 1990 (aged 34) | 1.78 m | 205 | 389 | (Denmark) Team Esbjerg |
| 25 | CB | Henny Reistad | 9 February 1999 (aged 25) | 1.81 m | 84 | 344 | (Denmark) Team Esbjerg |
| 33 | LB | Thale Rushfeldt Deila | 15 January 2000 (aged 24) | 1.78 m | 40 | 71 | (Denmark) Odense Håndbold |

Group play

| Pos | Team | Pld | W | D | L | GF | GA | GD | Pts | Qualification |
|---|---|---|---|---|---|---|---|---|---|---|
| 1 | Norway | 5 | 4 | 0 | 1 | 140 | 110 | +30 | 8 (Note: Norway 2 Pts, +5 GD; Sweden 2 Pts, +2 GD; Denmark 2 Pts, −7 GD.) | Quarterfinals |
| 2 | Sweden | 5 | 4 | 0 | 1 | 140 | 125 | +15 | 8 | Quarterfinals |
| 3 | Denmark | 5 | 4 | 0 | 1 | 126 | 116 | +10 | 8 | Quarterfinals |
| 4 | Germany | 5 | 1 | 0 | 4 | 136 | 134 | +2 | 2 (Note: Germany 2 Pts, +18 GD; South Korea 2 Pts, −6 GD; Slovenia 2 Pts, −12 GD.) | Quarterfinals |
| 5 | South Korea | 5 | 1 | 0 | 4 | 107 | 133 | −26 | 2 | |
| 6 | Slovenia | 5 | 1 | 0 | 4 | 116 | 147 | −31 | 2 | |

Source: Olympics Paris 2024 rankings
Rules for classification: 1) Points; 2) Head-to-head points; 3) Head-to-head goal difference; 4) Head-to-head goals scored; 5) Goal difference; 6) Goals scored; 7) Draw.
Notes:

| 25 July 2024; 21:00 | Norway | 28–32 | Sweden | Paris Expo Porte de Versailles, Paris; Attendance: 5,808; Referees: García, Marín (ESP) |
| 25 July 2024; 21:00 | Mørk, Oftedal 7 | (17–15) | Hagman 8 | Paris Expo Porte de Versailles, Paris; Attendance: 5,808; Referees: García, Marín (ESP) |
| 25 July 2024; 21:00 | 1× (yellow card) 3× (suspension) | Report | 1× (yellow card) 5× (suspension) 1× (red card) | Paris Expo Porte de Versailles, Paris; Attendance: 5,808; Referees: García, Marín (ESP) |

| 28 July 2024; 16:00 | Denmark | 18–27 | Norway | Paris Expo Porte de Versailles, Paris; Attendance: 5,815; Referees: C. Bonaventura, J. Bonaventura (FRA) |
| 28 July 2024; 16:00 | Østergaard 5 | (8–14) | Brattset Dale, Kristiansen 6 | Paris Expo Porte de Versailles, Paris; Attendance: 5,815; Referees: C. Bonaventura, J. Bonaventura (FRA) |
| 28 July 2024; 16:00 | 3× (suspension) | Report | 1× (suspension) | Paris Expo Porte de Versailles, Paris; Attendance: 5,815; Referees: C. Bonaventura, J. Bonaventura (FRA) |

| 30 July 2024; 11:00 | Norway | 26–20 | South Korea | Paris Expo Porte de Versailles, Paris; Attendance: 5,852; Referees: Brunner, Salah (SUI) |
| 30 July 2024; 11:00 | Skogrand 5 | (13–11) | Ryu 6 | Paris Expo Porte de Versailles, Paris; Attendance: 5,852; Referees: Brunner, Salah (SUI) |
| 30 July 2024; 11:00 | 1× (yellow card) 2× (suspension) | Report | 1× (suspension) | Paris Expo Porte de Versailles, Paris; Attendance: 5,852; Referees: Brunner, Salah (SUI) |

| 1 August 2024; 21:00 | Slovenia | 22–29 | Norway | Paris Expo Porte de Versailles, Paris; Attendance: 5,722; Referees: Belkhiri, Hamidi (ALG) |
| 1 August 2024; 21:00 | Gros, Mavsar 5 | (10–15) | three players 4 | Paris Expo Porte de Versailles, Paris; Attendance: 5,722; Referees: Belkhiri, Hamidi (ALG) |
| 1 August 2024; 21:00 | 1× (yellow card) 4× (suspension) | Report | 2× (suspension) 1× (red card) | Paris Expo Porte de Versailles, Paris; Attendance: 5,722; Referees: Belkhiri, Hamidi (ALG) |

| 3 August 2024; 19:00 | Norway | 30–18 | Germany | Paris Expo Porte de Versailles, Paris; Attendance: 5,714; Referees: A. Konjičanin, D. Konjičanin (BIH) |
| 3 August 2024; 19:00 | Reistad 8 | (14–8) | three players 3 | Paris Expo Porte de Versailles, Paris; Attendance: 5,714; Referees: A. Konjičanin, D. Konjičanin (BIH) |
| 3 August 2024; 19:00 | 3× (suspension) | Report | 2× (suspension) | Paris Expo Porte de Versailles, Paris; Attendance: 5,714; Referees: A. Konjičanin, D. Konjičanin (BIH) |

Quarterfinal

| 6 August 2024; 21:30 | Norway | 32–15 | Brazil | Stade Pierre-Mauroy, Lille; Attendance: 21,522; Referees: Kuttler, Merz (GER) |
| 6 August 2024; 21:30 | Jacobsen 6 | (16–8) | De Paula, Guarieiro 3 | Stade Pierre-Mauroy, Lille; Attendance: 21,522; Referees: Kuttler, Merz (GER) |
| 6 August 2024; 21:30 | 1× (yellow card) | Report | 1× (yellow card) 2× (suspension) | Stade Pierre-Mauroy, Lille; Attendance: 21,522; Referees: Kuttler, Merz (GER) |

Semifinal

| 8 August 2024; 21:30 | Norway | 25–21 | Denmark | Stade Pierre-Mauroy, Lille; Attendance: 15,975; Referees: Lah, Sok (SLO) |
| 8 August 2024; 21:30 | Brattset Dale 4 | (11–8) | Jørgensen 4 | Stade Pierre-Mauroy, Lille; Attendance: 15,975; Referees: Lah, Sok (SLO) |
| 8 August 2024; 21:30 | 1× (yellow card) 3× (suspension) | Report | 1× (yellow card) 3× (suspension) | Stade Pierre-Mauroy, Lille; Attendance: 15,975; Referees: Lah, Sok (SLO) |

Gold medal game

| 10 August 2024; 15:00 | Norway | 29–21 | France | Stade Pierre-Mauroy, Lille; Attendance: 26,664; Referees: García, Marín (ESP) |
| 10 August 2024; 15:00 | Reistad 8 | (15–13) | Kanor 5 | Stade Pierre-Mauroy, Lille; Attendance: 26,664; Referees: García, Marín (ESP) |
| 10 August 2024; 15:00 | 3× (suspension) | Report | 1× (yellow card) | Stade Pierre-Mauroy, Lille; Attendance: 26,664; Referees: García, Marín (ESP) |

== Rowing ==
Norwegian rowers qualified boats in each of the following classes through the 2023 World Rowing Championships in Belgrade, Serbia and 2024 Final Qualification Regatta in Lucerne, Switzerland.

| Athlete | Event | Heats | | Repechage | | Semifinals | | Final | |
| Athlete | Event | Time | Rank | Time | Rank | Time | Rank | Time | Rank |
|---|---|---|---|---|---|---|---|---|---|
| Martin Helseth; Kjetil Borch | Men's double sculls | 6:22.36 | 2 SA/B | Bye | | 6:20.27 | 6 FB | 6:17.51 | 10 |
| Kristoffer Brun; Jan Oscar Stabe Helvig; Jonas Slettemark Juel; Erik Andre Solbakken | Men's quadruple sculls | 5:50.48 | 4 R | 5:53.13 | 3 FB | —N/a | | 5:51.88 | 8 |
| Lars Martin Benske; Ask Jarl Tjoem | Men's lightweight double sculls | 6:41.77 | 2 SA/B | Bye | | 6:26.62 | 3 FA | 6:20.92 | 5 |
| Thea Helseth; Inger Seim Kavlie | Women's double sculls | 7:00.78 | 4 R | 7:10.39 | 2 SA/B | 6:52.47 | 3 FA | 6:58.41 | 6 |

Qualification Legend: FA=Final A (medal); FB=Final B (non-medal); FC=Final C (non-medal); FD=Final D (non-medal); FE=Final E (non-medal); FF=Final F (non-medal); SA/B=Semifinals A/B; SC/D=Semifinals C/D; SE/F=Semifinals E/F; QF=Quarterfinals; R=Repechage

== Sailing ==
Norwegian sailors qualified one boat in each of the following classes through the 2023 Sailing World Championships, the class-associated Worlds, and the continental regattas.

Elimination events

| Athlete | Event | Opening rounds | | | | | | | | | | | | | | | | Quarterfinal | Semifinal | Final | Final rank |
| Athlete | Event | 1 | 2 | 3 | 4 | 5 | 6 | 7 | 8 | 9 | 10 | 11 | 12 | 13 | 14 | Net points | Rank | Quarterfinal | Semifinal | Final | Final rank |
|---|---|---|---|---|---|---|---|---|---|---|---|---|---|---|---|---|---|---|---|---|---|
| Mina Mobekk | Women's IQFoil | 13 | 16 | 9 | 18 | 2 | 15 | 7 | 18 | 9 | 7 | 7 | 9 | 8 | ~~21~~ | 120 | 11 | Did not advance | | | 11 |

Medal race events

| Athlete | Event | Race | | | | | | | | | | | | | | | | Net points | Final rank |
| Athlete | Event | 1 | 2 | 3 | 4 | 5 | 6 | 7 | 8 | 9 | 10 | 11 | 12 | 13 | 14 | 15 | M* | Net points | Final rank |
|---|---|---|---|---|---|---|---|---|---|---|---|---|---|---|---|---|---|---|---|
| Hermann Tomasgaard | Men's Laser | ~~22~~ | 16 | 2 | 17 | 15 | 19 | 6 | 2 | —N/a | | | | | | | 8 | 85 | 5 |
| Line Høst | Women's Laser Radial | 11 | 3 | ~~19~~ | 19 | 7 | 2 | 12 | 14 | 3 | —N/a | | | | | | 4 | 75 | 3rd place, bronze medalist(s) |
| Helene Næss; Marie Rønningen | Women's 49erFX | 10 | 7 | 13 | ~~21~~; ~~UFD~~ | 5 | 9 | 5 | 5 | 7 | 2 | 5 | 8 | —N/a | | | 16 | 92 | 4 |

M = Medal race; EL = Eliminated – did not advance into the medal race

== Shooting ==
Norwegian shooters achieved quota places for the following events based on their results at the 2022 and 2023 ISSF World Championships, 2022, 2023, and 2024 European Championships, 2023 European Games, and 2024 ISSF World Olympic Qualification Tournament.

Men

| Athlete | Event | Qualification | | Final | |
| Athlete | Event | Points | Rank | Points | Rank |
|---|---|---|---|---|---|
| Jon-Hermann Hegg | 50 m rifle 3 positions | 593-36x | 2 Q | 430.2 | 5 |
| Ole Martin Halvorsen | 50 m rifle 3 positions | 586-32x | 23 | Did not advance | |
| Erik Watndal | Skeet | 117 | 22 | Did not advance | |

Women

| Athlete | Event | Qualification | | Final | |
| Athlete | Event | Points | Rank | Points | Rank |
|---|---|---|---|---|---|
| Jeanette Hegg Duestad | 10 m air rifle | 633.2 Q | 2 | 124.1 | 8 |
| Synnøve Berg | 10 m air rifle | 629.2 | 14 | Did not advance | |
| Jeanette Hegg Duestad | 50 m rifle 3 positions | 589-34x Q | 5 | 442.5 | 4 |
| Jenny Stene | 50 m rifle 3 positions | 585-37x | 15 | Did not advance | |

Mixed

| Athlete | Event | Qualification | | Final | |
| Athlete | Event | Points | Rank | Points | Rank |
|---|---|---|---|---|---|
| Jeanette Hegg Duestad; Jon-Hermann Hegg | 10 m air rifle team | 629.6 | 5 | Did not advance | |
| Synnøve Berg; Ole Martin Halvorsen | 10 m air rifle team | 623.8 | 21 | Did not advance | |

== Swimming ==
Norwegian swimmers achieved the entry standards in the following events for Paris 2024 (a maximum of two swimmers under the Olympic Qualifying Time (OST) and potentially at the Olympic Consideration Time (OCT)):

| Athlete | Event | Heat | | Semifinal | | Final | |
| Athlete | Event | Time | Rank | Time | Rank | Time | Rank |
|---|---|---|---|---|---|---|---|
| Nicholas Lia | Men's 50 m freestyle | 22.51 | 37 | Did not advance | | | |
| Henrik Christiansen | Men's 800 m freestyle | 8:00.55 | 25 | —N/a | | Did not advance | |
| Henrik Christiansen | Men's 1500 m freestyle | 15:14.11 | 20 | —N/a | | Did not advance | |
| Henrik Christiansen | 10km Open Water | —N/a | | | | 2:03:38.2 | 25 |
| Jon Jøntvedt | Men's 800 m freestyle | 7:59.16 | 24 | —N/a | | Did not advance | |

== Taekwondo ==
Norway qualified one athlete to compete at the games. Richard Ordemann qualified for Paris 2024 following the triumph of his victory in the men's over 80 kg semifinal, at the 2024 European Qualification Tournament in Sofia, Bulgaria.

| Athlete | Event | Qualification | Round of 16 | Quarterfinals | Semifinals | Repechage | Final / BM | |
| Athlete | Event | Opposition Result | Opposition Result | Opposition Result | Opposition Result | Opposition Result | Opposition Result | Rank |
|---|---|---|---|---|---|---|---|---|
| Richard Ordemann | Men's +80 kg | —N/a | Divković (SLO); W 2–1 | Šapina (CRO); L 1–2 | Did not advance | | | 9 |

== Tennis ==
Norway entered one tennis player into the Olympic tournament. Casper Ruud qualified directly for the men's singles as two of the top 56 eligible players in the ATP World Rankings as of 10 June 2024.

| Athlete | Event | Round of 64 | Round of 32 | Round of 16 | Quarterfinals | Semifinals | Final / BM | |
| Athlete | Event | Opposition Result | Opposition Result | Opposition Result | Opposition Result | Opposition Result | Opposition Result | Rank |
|---|---|---|---|---|---|---|---|---|
| Casper Ruud | Men's singles | Daniel (JPN); W 7–5, 6–1 | Vavassori (ITA); W 4–6, 6–4, 6–3 | Cerúndolo (ARG); W 6–3, 6–4 | Auger-Aliassime (CAN); L 4–6, 7–6^{(10–8)}, 3–6 | Did not advance | | |

== Triathlon ==
Norway confirmed four quota places (two per gender) in the triathlon events for Paris, by virtue of winning one of two available spots at the 2024 World Triathlon Mixed Relay Qualification Event in Huatulco, Mexico.

Individual

| Athlete | Event | Time | | | | | | Rank |
| Athlete | Event | Swim (1.5 km) | Trans 1 | Bike (40 km) | Trans 2 | Run (10 km) | Total | Rank |
|---|---|---|---|---|---|---|---|---|
| Kristian Blummenfelt | Men's | 21:00 | 0:53 | 51:29 | 0:26 | 30:39 | 1:44:27 | 12 |
| Vetle Bergsvik Thorn | Men's | 20:30 | 0:50 | 52:02 | 0:25 | 31:34 | 1:45:21 | 17 |
| Solveig Løvseth | Women's | 28:00 | 0:58 | 1:00:14 | 0:33 | 36:04 | 2:05:49 | 48 |
| Lotte Miller | Women's | 24:40 | 1:00 | Did not finish | | | | |

Relay

| Athlete | Event | Time | | | | | | Rank |
| Athlete | Event | Swim (300 m) | Trans 1 | Bike (7 km) | Trans 2 | Run (2 km) | Total group | Rank |
|---|---|---|---|---|---|---|---|---|
| Vetle Bergsvik Thorn | Mixed relay | 4:17 | 1:03 | 9:34 | 0:23 | 4:58 | 20:15 | —N/a |
| Lotte Miller | Mixed relay | 5:09 | 1:10 | 10:23 | 0:26 | 5:49 | 22:57 | —N/a |
| Kristian Blummenfelt | Mixed relay | 4:35 | 1:10 | 9:21 | 0:25 | 5:02 | 20:33 | —N/a |
| Solveig Løvseth | Mixed relay | 5:47 | 1:10 | 10:35 | 0:26 | 5:57 | 23:55 | —N/a |
| Total | Mixed relay | —N/a | | | | | 1:27:40 | 11 |

== Volleyball ==
=== Beach ===
Norwegian men's pair qualified for Paris based on the FIVB Beach Volleyball Olympic Ranking.

| Athletes | Event | Preliminary round | | | | Round of 16 | Quarterfinal | Semifinal | Final / BM | |
| Athletes | Event | Opposition Score | Opposition Score | Opposition Score | Rank | Opposition Score | Opposition Score | Opposition Score | Opposition Score | Rank |
|---|---|---|---|---|---|---|---|---|---|---|
| Anders Mol; Christian Sørum | Men's | M. Grimalt / E. Grimalt (CHI); W 2–0 (21–14, 21–16) | Ranghieri / Carambula (ITA); W 2–0 (21–12, 21–15) | Van de Velde / Immers (NED); W 2–0 (21–16, 21–19) | 1 Q | Evans / Budinger (USA); W 2–0 (21–16, 21–14) | Herrera – Gavira (ESP); W 2–0 (21–16, 21–17) | Ehlers – Wickler (GER); L 2–1 (13–21, 21–17, 13–15) | Younousse – Janko (QAT); W 2–0 (21–13, 21–16) | 3rd place, bronze medalist(s) |

== Weightlifting ==
Norway entered one weightlifter into the Olympic competition. Solfrid Koanda (women's 81 kg) secured one of the top ten slots in her weight divisions based on the IWF Olympic Qualification Rankings.

| Athlete | Event | Snatch | | Clean & Jerk | | Total | Rank |
| Athlete | Event | Result | Rank | Result | Rank | Total | Rank |
|---|---|---|---|---|---|---|---|
| Solfrid Koanda | Women's −81 kg | 121 | 2 | 154 OR | 1 | 275 OR | 1st place, gold medalist(s) |

== Wrestling ==
Norway qualified one wrestlers for each of the following classes into the Olympic competition. Grace Bullen qualified for the games by virtue of top five results through the 2023 World Championships in Belgrade, Serbia.

Key:

- VT (ranking points: 5–0 or 0–5) – Victory by fall.
- VB (ranking points: 5–0 or 0–5) – Victory by injury (VF for forfeit, VA for withdrawal or disqualification)
- PP (ranking points: 3–1 or 1–3) – Decision by points – the loser with technical points.
- PO (ranking points: 3–0 or 0–3) – Decision by points – the loser without technical points.
- ST (ranking points: 4–0 or 0–4) – Great superiority – the loser without technical points and a margin of victory of at least 8 (Greco-Roman) or 10 (freestyle) points.
- SP (ranking points: 4–1 or 1–4) – Technical superiority – the loser with technical points and a margin of victory of at least 8 (Greco-Roman) or 10 (freestyle) points.

Freestyle

| Athlete | Event | Round of 16 | Quarterfinal | Semifinal | Repechage | Final / BM | |
| Athlete | Event | Opposition Result | Opposition Result | Opposition Result | Opposition Result | Opposition Result | Rank |
|---|---|---|---|---|---|---|---|
| Grace Bullen | Women's −62 kg | Bousetta (TUN); W 12–2 | Niemesch (GER); W 10–0 | Motoki (JPN); L 7–7^{F} | —N/a | Godinez (CAN); W 11–0 | 3rd place, bronze medalist(s) |

== See also ==
- Norway at the 2024 Winter Youth Olympics
