= Ireland at the 2023 European Games =

- IOC code: IRL
- NOC: Olympic Federation of Ireland
- Website: www.olympic.ie

in Kraków, Poland 21 June 2023 – 2 July 2023
- Competitors: 123
- Flag bearers: Sarah Lavin and Liam Jegou (Opening) (Closing)
- Medals: Gold 4 Silver 4 Bronze 5 Total 13

European Games appearances (overview)
- 2015; 2019; 2023; 2027

Ireland competed at the 2023 European Games, in Kraków, Poland from 21 June to 2 July 2023. This was Ireland's third appearance at the Games.

== Archery ==
Ireland qualified one man and one woman in recurve archery, which also entitled Ireland to a team in the mixed recurve competition.

Men

Athlete	Event	Ranking round		Round of 64	Round of 32	Round of 16	Quarterfinal	Semi-final	Final / BM	
Athlete	Event	Score	Seed	Opposition Score	Opposition Score	Opposition Score	Opposition Score	Opposition Score	Opposition Score	Rank
Oskar Ronan	Individual recurve	601	47	Bye	Hunbin (UKR); L 3–7	Did not advance				

Women

Athlete	Event	Ranking round		Round of 64	Round of 32	Round of 16	Quarterfinal	Semi-final	Final / BM	
Athlete	Event	Score	Seed	Opposition Result	Opposition Result	Opposition Result	Opposition Result	Opposition Result	Opposition Result	Rank
Emma Davis	Individual recurve	587	45	Bye	Straka (AUT); L 0–6	Did not advance				

== Athletics ==
Ireland competed in the Third Division of the 2023 European Athletics Team Championships which is going to be held in Chorzów during, and as part of, the Games. Ireland will compete in the team event, and each athlete will also be eligible for the individual event medals. The team was announced on 7 June 2023.

On 20, 21 and 22 June, Ireland won the third divisional match, with 14 individual event victories, to confirm promotion to the Second Division for 2025.

=== European Athletics Team Championships Third Division ===
Team	Event		Event points																			Total	Rank
Team	Event		100m	200m	400m	800m	1500m	5000m	110m h*	400m h	3000m SC	4x100m	4x400m**	SP	JT	HT	DT	PV	HJ	TJ	LJ	Total	Rank
Ireland see below	Team Championships Third Division	Men	14	15	13	13	14	13	15	15	14	15	15	15	13	15	11	12	15	9	-	494	1
Ireland see below	Team Championships Third Division	Women	13	14	15	15	15	13	15	14	13	14	15	14	11	14	12	15	13	13	15	494	1

key: h: hurdles; SC; Steeplechase: SP; Shot put: JT: Javelin: HT: Hammer: DT: Discus: PV: Pole vault: HJ: High jump: TJ: Triple Jump: LJ: Long Jump

: won the match event

- Women compete at 100 metre hurdles, rather than 110 metre hurdles.
- 4 x 400 metres is held as a single mixed sex event

=== Individual events at the 2023 European Games ===
As a participant in the Team event, each nation, including Ireland, automatically enters one athlete in each of the individual 'events'. Medals are awarded at the conclusion of the First Division program. The 'Match position' table notes where the athlete finished in their division, the 'Overall ranking' where they finished across three divisions; the individual European Games medals will be decided by the overall ranking.

Event	Male Athlete	Score	Match position	Overall ranking	Female athlete	Score	Match position	Overall ranking
100 m	Israel Olatunde	10.37	2	13	Lauren Roy	11.82	3	
200 m	Mark Smyth	20.66	1	6	Phil Healy	23.79	2	
400 m	Jack Raftery	46.76	3	23	Sharlene Mawdsley	51.55	1	
800 m	Rocco Zaman-Browne	1:50.16	3	25	Louise Shanahan	2:03.39	1	
1500 m	Cathal Doyle	3:43.36	2	18	Sophie O'Sullivan	4:27.96	1	
5000 m	Fearghal Curtin	14:17.64	3	27	Aoibhe Richardson	16:45.02	3	
110/100 m h	James Ezeonu	14.31	1	24	Sarah Lavin	12.82	1	3rd place, bronze medalist(s)
400m h	Thomas Barr	49.41	1	5	Kelly McGrory	58.08	2	
3000m SC	Finley Daly	8:51.14	2	16	Ava O'Connor	10:18.10	3	
4x100 m	Israel Olatunde; Mark Smyth; Christopher Sibanda; Joseph Ojewumi	39.57	1		Sarah LeahyMollie O'Reilly; Joan Healy; Adeyemi Talabi	44.80	2	
4x400 m (mixed)	—N/a				Thomas Barr; Jack Raftery; Callum Baird; Phil Healy; Sharlene Mawdsley; Kelly McGrory; Roisin Harrison	3:17.16	1 EL	
Shot put	Eric Favors	20.28	1		Michaela Walsh	15.26	2	
Javelin	Conor Cusack	63.95	3		Grace Casey	42.04	5	
Hammer	Sean Mockler	63.83	1		Nicola Tuthill	67.85 NU23R	2	
Discus	Colin Quirke	52.41	5		Niamh Fogerty	51.24	4	
Pole vault	Michael Bowler	4.30	4	33	Ellie McCartney	4.30	1	
High jump	David Cussen	2.11	1	16	Sommer Lecky	1.74	3	
Triple Jump	Jai Benson	14.84	7	28	Saragh Buggy	13.01	3	
Long Jump	Reece Ademola	NM	-	-	Ruby Millet	6.33	1	

== Badminton ==
Ireland selected a team of six badminton players across five events. The draw was made on 6 June by Badminton Europe and Broadcast on Facebook.

Athlete	Event	Group stage				Round of 16	Quarter-finals	Semi-finals	Final	
Athlete	Event	Opposition Score	Opposition Score	Opposition Score	Rank	Opposition Score	Opposition Score	Opposition Score	Opposition Score	Rank
Nhat Nguyen	Men's singles	Dratva (SVK); W (23–21, 21–19)	Torjussen (GBR); W (21–8, 21–16)	Caljouw (NED); L (16–21, 15–21)	2 Q	Axelsen (DEN); L (8–21, 13–21)	Did not advance			
Rachael Darragh	Women's singles	Švábíková (CZE); L (21–23, 18–21)	Sudimac (SRB); W (13–21, 21–19, 23–21)	Qi (NED); L (18–21, 22–24)	3	Did not advance				
Joshua Magee; Paul Reynolds	Men's doubles	Greco / Salutt (ITA); W (21–17, 21–12)	Lane / Vendy (GBR); L (15–21, 15–21)	Dwicahyo / Qowimuramadhoni (AZE); L (21–19, 14–21, 16–21)	2 Q	—N/a	Astrup / Rasmussen (DEN); L (16–21, 15–21)	Did not advance		
Kate Frost; Moya Ryan	Women's doubles	Lambert / Tran (FRA); L (7–21, 8–21)	M Sjöö / T Sjöö (SWE); L (14–21, 11–21)	Efler / Lohau (GER); L (17–21, 8–21)	4	—N/a	Did not advance			
Joshua Magee; Moya Ryan	Mixed doubles	Bailetti / Corsini (ITA); W (21–14, 21–13)	Dratva / Vargová (SVK); W (~~21–5, 21–15~~)	Gicquel / Delrue (FRA); L (12–21, 17–21)	2 Q	—N/a	Tabeling / Piek (NED); L (8–21, 6–21)	Did not advance		

== Boxing ==
Ireland announced a team of twelve boxers for the European Games. Only in the men's super-heavyweight class are Ireland not represented.

Men

Athlete	Event	Round of 64	Round of 32	Round of 16	Quarterfinal	Semi-final	Final / BM	
Athlete	Event	Opposition Result	Opposition Result	Opposition Result	Opposition Result	Opposition Result	Opposition Result	Rank
Sean Mari	Flyweight	Bye	Molina (ESP); L 0–5	Did not advance				
Jude Gallagher	Featherweight	—N/a	Ibáñez (BUL); L 1–4	Did not advance				
Dean Clancy	Light welterweight	—N/a	Chabyan (AUT); W 0–5	Hasanov (AZE); W 2–3	Malanga (ITA); W 0–5	Oumiha (FRA); L 0–5	Did not advance	3rd place, bronze medalist(s)
Dean Walsh	Light middleweight	Bye	Cavallero (ITA); L 3–2	Did not advance				
Kelyn Cassidy	Light heavyweight	—N/a	Gedminas (NOR); W 5–0	Bevan (GBR); W 0–5	Khyzhniak (UKR); L 0–3	Did not advance		
Jack Marley	Heavyweight	—N/a	Bye	Nanitzanian (GRE); W 1–4	Čalić (CRO); W 1–4	Reyes (ESP); W 4–1	Mouhiidine (ITA); L 0–5	2nd place, silver medalist(s)

Women

Athlete	Event	Round of 32	Round of 16	Quarterfinal	Semi-final	Final	
Athlete	Event	Opposition Result	Opposition Result	Opposition Result	Opposition Result	Opposition Result	Rank
Daina Moorehouse	Light flyweight	Bye	Kob (UKR); W 1–4	Lkhadiri (FRA); L 3–2	Did not advance		
Jennifer Lehane	Bantamweight	Ćirković (SRB); W 2–3	Giannakopoulou (GRE); W 5–0	Petrova (BUL); L 5–0	Did not advance		
Michaela Walsh	Featherweight	Papadatou (GRE); W 0–5	Taşkın (TUR); W 0–5	Mortensen (DEN); W 5–0	Zidani (FRA); L 1–4	Did not advance	3rd place, bronze medalist(s)
Kellie Harrington	Lightweight	Jedináková (SVK); W 4–1	Kocharyan (ARM); W 0–5	Alexiusson (SWE); W 4–1	Mossely (FRA); W 5–0	Shadrina (SRB); W 5–0	1st place, gold medalist(s)
Amy Broadhurst	Welterweight	Matović (SRB); W 5–0	Rozentāle (LAT); W 5–0	Eccles (GBR); W 2–3	Did not advance		
Aoife O'Rourke	Middleweight	Bye	Ngamba (EOR); W 2–3	Holgersson (SWE); W 0–5	Wójcik (POL); W 2–3	Michel (FRA); W 0–5	1st place, gold medalist(s)

== Canoe Sprint ==
Ireland qualified one woman for canoe sprint.

Athlete	Event	Heats		Semi-final		Final	
Athlete	Event	Time	Rank	Time	Rank	Time	Rank
Jennifer Egan	Women's K-1 500 metres	2:05.032	7	2:02.693	9	Did Not Advance	

Qualification legend: SF – Qualify to semifinal; FA – Qualify to medal final; FB – Qualify to non-medal final

== Canoe Slalom ==
Ireland qualified eight slalom canoeists to the Games.

Athlete	Event	Preliminary						Semi-final		Final	
Athlete	Event	Run 1	Rank	Run 2	Rank	Best	Rank	Time	Rank	Time	Rank
Liam Jegou	Men's C1	93.56	11	—		93.56	24	108.25	24	Did Not Advance	
Jake Cochrane	Men's C1	97.34	25	98.93	10	97.34	30	220.67	30	Did Not Advance	
Robert Hendrick	Men's C1	155.65	43	99.64	11	99.64	31	Did Not Advance		Did Not Advance	
Noel Hendrick	Men's K1	89.10	23	—		89.10	25	98.06	28	Did Not Advance	
Alistair McCreery	Men's K1	91.35	34	94.13	14	91.35	44	Did Not Advance		Did Not Advance	
Samuel Curtis	Men's K1	90.20	27	—		90.20	31	102.52	31	Did Not Advance	
Liam Jegou	Men's K1 extreme cross										
Jake Cochrane	Men's K1 extreme cross										
Robert Hendrick	Men's K1 extreme cross										
Liam Jegou; Jake Cochrane; Robert Hendrick	Men's C1 team	—N/a								118.24	10
Michaela Corcoran	Women's C1	128.81	33	117.04	10	117.04	30	181.02	30	Did not advance	
Madison Corcoran	Women's K1	110.42	32	106.72	8	106.72	23	112.06	23	Did not advance	
Madison Corcoran	Women's K-1 extreme cross										

== Cycling ==
Ireland qualified two cyclists, both male, to the 2023 European Games.

=== Mountain Bike ===
Men

Athlete	Event	Time	Rank
Chris Dawson	Men's cross country	1:24.32	39

=== BMX freestyle ===
Men

Athlete	Event	Seeding				Final		
Athlete	Event	Run 1	Run 2	Average	Rank	Run 1	Run 2	Rank
Ryan Henderson	Men's park	61.33	63.00	62.16	22	Did not advance		

== Diving ==
Ireland nominated three divers in five events.

Men

Athlete	Events	Preliminary		Final	
Athlete	Events	Points	Rank	Points	Rank
Jake Passmore	1 metre springboard	326.70	11	327.85	11
Jake Passmore	3-metre springboard	385.05	10	383.70	10

Women

Athlete	Events	Preliminary		Final	
Athlete	Events	Points	Rank	Points	Rank
Clare Cryan	1 metre springboard	187.85	22	Did not advance	
Clare Cryan	3-metre springboard	288.45	4	254.50	10
Ciara McGing	10-metre platform	254.65	11	280.10	6

Mixed

Athlete	Events	Final	
Athlete	Events	Points	Rank
Clare Cryan; Jake Passmore	3-metre springboard synchro	259.95	6

== Fencing ==
Ireland qualified four individuals and one team for the Games.

Athlete	Event	Group stage						Rank	Knockout stage					Final rank
Athlete	Event	Match 1	Match 2	Match 3	Match 4	Match 5	Match 6	Rank	1/16 final	1/8 final	1/4 final	1/2 final	Medal final	Final rank
Giacomo Patrick Pietrobelli	Men's Epeé													
Michalis Kirimlidis	Men's Sabre													
Michael Jacob	Men's Sabre													
Jadryn Dick	Men's Sabre													
Michalis Kirimlidis; Michael Jacob; Jadryn Dick	Men's team sabre													

== Kickboxing ==
Ireland has qualified nine kickboxers for the European Games.

Athlete	Discipline	Event	Quarterfinal	Semi-final	Final	
Athlete	Discipline	Event	Opposition Result	Opposition Result	Opposition Result	Rank
Amy Wall	Full contact	Women's -60 kg				1st place, gold medalist(s)
Eoin Glynn	Full contact	Men's -63 kg				
Peter Carr	Full contact	Men's -75 kg				
Tony Stephenson	Light contact	Men's -69 kg				
Nicole Bannon	Light contact	Women's -60 kg				3rd place, bronze medalist(s)
Nicole Bannon	Pointfighting	Women's -60 kg				
Luke McCann	Pointfighting	Men's -63 kg				
Jodie Browne	Pointfighting	Women's -70 kg				3rd place, bronze medalist(s)
Nathan Tait	Pointfighting	Men's -74 kg				2nd place, silver medalist(s)
Conor McGlinchey	Pointfighting	Men's -84 kg				2nd place, silver medalist(s)

== Modern pentathlon ==
Ireland nominated three athletes, all women, for modern pentathlon.

Athlete	Event	Fencing (épée one touch)				Swimming (200 m freestyle)			Riding (show jumping)			Combined: shooting/running (10 m air pistol)/(3200 m)			Total points	Final rank
Athlete	Event	RR	BR	Rank	MP points	Time	Rank	MP points	Penalties	Rank	MP points	Time	Rank	MP Points	Total points	Final rank
Sive Brassil	Women's individual															
Hannah D'Aughton	Women's individual															
Isobel Radford-Dodd	Women's individual															
Sive Brassil; Hannah D'Aughton; Isobel Radford-Dodd	Women's team															

== Padel ==
Athlete	Event	Round Of 32	Round of 16	Quarter Final	Semi Final	Final
Susan McRann Jennifer Claffey	Women's Doubles	Kurz/Hofer (GER) L 6-0 6-4	Did Not Advance			

== Rugby sevens ==
Ireland qualified both a men's and women's team for the rugby sevens tournament in Kraków. As Ireland have already qualified for the women's tournament at the 2024 Summer Olympics, they will not take part in this tournament. Their place was taken by Norway.

Team	Event	Group stage				Quarterfinals	Semifinals	Final / BM	
Team	Event	Opposition Score	Opposition Score	Opposition Score	Rank	Opposition Score	Opposition Score	Opposition Score	Rank
Ireland men's	Men's tournament	Poland; W 66–0	Italy; W 38–7	Germany; W 19–7	1 Q	Belgium; W 26–12	Portugal; W 24–0	Great Britain; W 26–12	1st place, gold medalist(s)

== Shooting ==
Ireland announced its two shooting athletes on 6 June 2023.

Athlete	Event	Qualification		Final	
Athlete	Event	Points	Rank	Points	Rank
Aoife Gormally	Women's trap	113	18	Did not advance	
Jack Fairclough	Men's skeet	118	29	Did not advance	

== Taekwondo ==
Ireland have qualified two taekwondo-ka.

Athlete	Event	Round of 16	Quarterfinal	Semi-final	Repechage	Final	
Athlete	Event	Opposition Result	Opposition Result	Opposition Result	Opposition Result	Opposition Result	Rank
Jack Woolley	58 kg	Alami (SWE); W 2–0	Nour (GBR); W 2–0	Lomartire (ITA); W 2–0	—N/a	Vicente (ESP); L 1–2	2nd place, silver medalist(s)
Leroy Nsilu Dilandu	74 kg	Kintsurashvili (GEO); L 0–2	Did not advance		Quesada (ESP); L 0–2	Did not advance	

== Triathlon ==
Ireland qualified four triathletes, two men and two women, for the Games. As a result, they have also earned a berth in the mixed relay.

Athlete	Event	Swim (1.5 km)	Trans 1	Bike (40 km)	Trans 2	Run (10 km)	Total time	Rank
James Edgar	Men's triathlon	18:36	0:53	59:55	0:33	31:32	1:51:27	41
Luke McCarron	Men's triathlon	19:29	0:56	1:00:25	0:30	32:21	1:52:38	47
Erin McConnell	Women's triathlon	19:40	1:00	1:03:22	0:33	38:33	2:03:06	27
Carolyn Hayes	Women's triathlon	Did not start						51
James Edgar; Luke McCarron; Carolyn Hayes; Erin McConell	Mixed relay	16:06	2:07	31:12	1:47	19:21	1:10:37	14
