= Slovakia at the 2023 European Games =

- IOC code: SVK
- NOC: Slovak Olympic and Sports Committee
- Website: www.olympic.sk

in Kraków, Poland 21 June 2023 – 2 July 2023
- Competitors: 145 in 20 sports
- Flag bearers: Barbora Balážová; Miroslav Duchoň (opening); Zuzana Michaličková (closing)
- Medals Ranked 33rd: Gold 1 Silver 4 Bronze 3 Total 8

European Games appearances (overview)
- 2015; 2019; 2023; 2027

Slovakia competed at the 2023 European Games, in Kraków, Poland from 21 June to 2 July 2023.

The Slovak Olympic and Sports Committee sent a total of 145 athletes to the Games; 76 men and 69 women, to compete in 20 sports.

== Medalists ==
Medal	Name	Sport	Event	Date
Gold	Jozef Bošanský	Archery	Men's individual compound	29 June
Silver	Kamila Novotná	Shooting	Women's 10 metre air rifle	23 June
Silver	Danka Barteková; Vanesa Hocková; Monika Štibravá	Shooting	Women's team skeet	27 June
Silver	Matej Beňuš; Marko Mirgorodský; Alexander Slafkovský	Canoe slalom	Men's C1 team	30 June
Silver	Adrián Drobný; Marián Kovačócy; Erik Varga	Shooting	Men's team trap	2 July
Bronze	Gabriela Gajanová	Athletics	Women's 800 m	24 June
Bronze	Ján Volko	Athletics	Men's 200 m	25 June
Bronze	Jana Špotáková	Shooting	Women's trap	30 June

== Archery ==
Men

Athlete	Event	Ranking round		Round of 32	Round of 16	Quarterfinals	Semifinals	Final / BM	
Athlete	Event	Score	Seed	Opposition Score	Opposition Score	Opposition Score	Opposition Score	Opposition Score	Rank
Miroslav Duchoň	Individual recurve	634	41	Cerni (CRO); W 6-2	Kozhokar (UKR); W 6-0	Alvariño (ESP); L 5-6	Did not advance		
Jozef Bošanský	Individual compound	709	7	N/A	López (ESP); W 146-144	Jäätma (EST); W 149-145	Haney (TUR); W 147-145	Bruno (ITA); W 146-144	1st place, gold medalist(s)

Women

Athlete	Event	Ranking round		Round of 32	Round of 16	Quarterfinals	Semifinals	Final / BM	
Athlete	Event	Score	Seed	Opposition Score	Opposition Score	Opposition Score	Opposition Score	Opposition Score	Rank
Denisa Baránková	Individual recurve	652	17	N/A	Pitman (GBR); L 4-6	Did not advance			

Mixed

Athlete	Event	Round of 16	Quarterfinals	Semifinals	Final / BM	
Athlete	Event	Opposition Score	Opposition Score	Opposition Score	Opposition Score	Rank
Miroslav Duchoň; Denisa Baránková	Team recurve	Jarno de Smedt (BEL); Charlotte Destrooper (BEL); L 4-5	Did not advance			

== Artistic swimming ==
Athlete	Event	Final	
Athlete	Event	Points	Rank
Chiara Diky; Lea Anna Krajčovičová	Duet technical	193.8233	12

== Athletics ==
=== Men ===
Track events

Athlete	Event	Second division			Final standing
Athlete	Event	Result	Position	Match points	Final standing
Ján Volko	100 metres	10.24 SB	1	16	—
Ján Volko	200 metres	20.53 SB	1	16	3rd place, bronze medalist(s)
Šimon Bujna	400 metres	46.89	9	8	—
Filip Bielek	800 metres	1:50.18 PB	11	6	—
Peter Kováć	1500 metres	3:48.16 SB	10	7	—
Peter Ďurec	5000 metres	13:58.22 PB	4	13	—
Dávid Mazúch	3000 metres steeplechase	9:01.75	9	8	—
Dominik Labuda	110 metres hurdles	15.21 SB	16	1	—
Matej Baluch	400 metres hurdles	49.56 PB	3	14	—
Michal Bačík; Filip Federič; Samuel Beladič; Jakub nemec	4 x 100 metres relay	40.71 SB	12	3	—

Field events

Athlete	Event	Second division			Final standing
Athlete	Event	Result	Position	Match points	Final standing
Lukáš Beer	High jump	1.97	14	3	—
Alan Černý	Pole vault	4.90 PB	7	9.50	—
Michal Bačík	Long jump	NM			—
Matúš Blšták	Triple jump	14.75	12	5	—
Adrián Baran	Shot put	18.02 SB	10	7	—
Samuel Kováč	Discus throw	51.89	12	5	—
Marcel Lomnický	Hammer throw	71.69	6	11	—
Maximilián Slezák	Javelin throw	73.78	7	10	—

=== Women ===
Track events

Athlete	Event	Second division			Final standing
Athlete	Event	Result	Position	Match points	Final standing
Monika Weigertová	100 metres	11.51	5	12	—
Lenka Kovačovicová	200 metres	24.28	15	2	—
Alexandra Bezeková	400 metres	53.85 SB	10	7	—
Gabriela Gajanová	800 metres	1:59.92	3	14	3rd place, bronze medalist(s)
Žofia Naňová	1500 metres	4:20.95 PB	9	8	—
Žofia Naňová	5000 metres	16:31.19 PB	8	9	—
Lucia Keszeghová	3000 metres steeplechase	10:48.83 PB	9	8	—
Stanislava Škvarková	100 metres hurdles	13.13	4	13	—
Daniela Ledecká	400 metres hurdles	57.83 SB	4	13	—
Viktória Forster; Agáta Cellerová; Stanislava Škvarková; Monika Weigertová	4 x 100 metres relay	44.69 SB	6	11	—

Field events

Athlete	Event	Second division			Final standing
Athlete	Event	Result	Position	Match points	Final standing
Terézia Veneková	High jump	1.73 PB	14	3	—
Júlia Havjerová	Pole vault	3.05	11	6	—
Monika Lehenová	Long jump	6.10	8	9	—
Zuzana Ďurkechová	Triple jump	12.62	11	6	—
Monika Marjová	Shot put	13.19	14	3	—
Barbora Jakubcová	Discus throw	44.71	13	4	—
Veronika Kaňuchová	Hammer throw	65.54	5	12	—
Petra Hanuliaková	Javelin throw	46.92	10	7	—

=== Mixed ===
Track events

Athlete	Event	Second division			Final standing
Athlete	Event	Result	Position	Match points	Final standing
Patrik Dömötör; Gabriela Gajanová; Šimon Bujna; Alexandra Bezeková	Mixed 4 x 400 metres relay	3:19.84 SB	7	10	—

== Badminton ==
Athlete	Event	Group stage				Round of 16	Quarter-finals	Semi-finals	Final	
Athlete	Event	Opposition Score	Opposition Score	Opposition Score	Rank	Opposition Score	Opposition Score	Opposition Score	Opposition Score	Rank
Milan Dratva	Men's singles	Nguyen (IRL); L (21–23, 19–21)	Caljouw (NED); L (19–21, 13–21)	Torjussen (GBR); L (20–22, 17–21)	4	Did not advance				
Katarína Vargová	Women's singles	Polikarpova (ISR); L (~~17–21, 17–21~~)	Marín (ESP); L (~~2–13 retired~~)	Stadelmann (SUI) w/o	–	Did not advance				
Milan Dratva; Katarína Vargová	Mixed doubles	Gicquel / Delrue (FRA); L (~~14–21, 11–21~~)	Magee / Ryan (IRL); L (~~5–21, 15–21~~)	Bailetti / Corsini (ITA) w/o	–	—	Did not advance			

== Boxing ==
Men

Athlete	Event	Round of 32	Round of 16	Quarterfinals	Semifinals	Final	
Athlete	Event	Opposition Result	Opposition Result	Opposition Result	Opposition Result	Opposition Result	Rank
Viliam Tankó	63.5kg - lightweight	Kamanin (EST); W 4–1	Guruli (GEO); L 0–5	Did not advance			
Michal Takács	71kg - welterweight	Aliyev (AZE); L 0–5	Did not advance				
Dávid Michálek	+92kg - super heavyweight	Bye	Okafor (GER); L 0–5	Did not advance			

Women

Athlete	Event	Round of 32	Round of 16	Quarterfinals	Semifinals	Final	
Athlete	Event	Opposition Result	Opposition Result	Opposition Result	Opposition Result	Opposition Result	Rank
Nicole Ďuríková	50 kg-Flyweight	Bye	Lkhadiri (FRA); L 0–5	Did not advance			
Miroslava Jedináková	60kg - lightweight	Harrington (IRL); L 1–4	Did not advance				
Jessica Triebeľová	75kg - middleweight	Bye	Gemini (ITA); L 1–4	Did not advance			

== Canoe slalom ==
Men

Athlete	Event	Preliminary				Semifinal		Final	
Athlete	Event	Run 1	Rank	Run 2	Rank	Time	Rank	Time	Rank
Martin Halčin	K-1	90.11	26 Q	—		90.95	6 Q	97.95	9
Jakub Grigar	K-1	87.51	9 Q	—		92.01	9 Q	91.74	6
Adam Gonšenica	K-1	93.39	38	93.14	10 Q	96.60	26	Did not advance	
Martin Halčin	Kayak cross	75.46	38	Did not advance					
Jakub Grigar	Kayak cross	67.67	51	Did not advance					
Ilja Buran	Kayak cross	76.78	40	Did not advance					
Martin Halčin; Jakub Grigar; Adam Gonšenica	K1 team	—						108.96	9
Matej Beňuš	C-1	97.69	26	93.99	3 Q	100.77	12	Did not advance	
Marko Mirgorodský	C-1	94.34	15 Q	—		103.88	18	Did not advance	
Alexander Slafkovský	C-1	93.66	12 Q	—		104.89	20	Did not advance	
Matej Beňuš; Marko Mirgorodský; Alexander Slafkovský	C1 team	—						105.60	2nd place, silver medalist(s)

Women

Athlete	Event	Preliminary				Semifinal		Final	
Athlete	Event	Run 1	Rank	Run 2	Rank	Time	Rank	Time	Rank
Soňa Stanovská	K-1	102.71	23	108.09	10 Q	158.69	29	Did not advance	
Eliška Mintálová	K-1	99.55	15 Q	—		108.21	19	Did not advance	
Michaela Haššová	K-1	115.60	36	118.15	16	Did not advance			
Soňa Stanovská	Kayak cross	72.79	27	Did not advance					
Eliška Mintálová	Kayak cross	68.01	4 Q	1 Q		4		Did not advance	
Zuzana Paňková	Kayak cross	68.86	7 Q	3		Did not advance			
Soňa Stanovská; Eliška Mintálová; Michaela Haššová	K1 team	—						121.24	7
Soňa Stanovská	C-1	107.12	10 Q	—		115.86	11	Did not advance	
Zuzana Paňková	C-1	105.58	6 Q	—		112.45	5 Q	115.41	5
Emanuela Luknárová	C-1	111.11	19 Q	—		117.67	17	Did not advance	
Soňa Stanovská; Zuzana Paňková; Emanuela Luknárová	C1 team	—						132.02	6

== Canoe sprint ==
Men

Athlete	Event	Heats		Semifinals		Finals	
Athlete	Event	Time	Rank	Time	Rank	Time	Rank
Milan Dörner	K1 500 m	1:46.364	5 SF	1:44.373	6 FB	1:43.003	17
Milan Dörner	C1 500 m	3:20.828	9	Did not advance			
Erik Vlček; Ákos Gacsal	K2 500 m	1:33.132	3 FA	bye		1:31.503	8
Eduard Strýček; Peter Kizek	C2 500 m	1:46.741	7 SF	1:46.667	5	Did not advance	
Denis Myšák; Samuel Baláž; Csaba Zalka; Adam Botek	K4 500 m	1:22.510	6 SF	1:23.285	6	Did not advance	

Women

Athlete	Event	Heats		Semifinals		Finals	
Athlete	Event	Time	Rank	Time	Rank	Time	Rank
Bianka Sidová; Katarína Pecsuková; Réka Bugár; Mariana Petrušová	K4 500 m	1:36.142	6 SF	1:37.022	6	Did not advance	

Mixed

Athlete	Event	Heats		Semifinals		Finals	
Athlete	Event	Time	Rank	Time	Rank	Time	Rank
Bianka Sidová; Denis Myšák	K2 200 m	36.332	3 SF	35.158	6 FB	35.536	12

== Cycling ==
=== Mountain Bike ===
Men

Athlete	Event	Time	Rank
Matej Ulík	Men's cross country	1:29:35	54

Women

Athlete	Event	Time	Rank
Martina Krahulcová	Women's cross country	LAP	
Janka Keseg Števková	Women's cross country	LAP	

=== BMX freestyle ===
Men

Athlete	Event	Seeding				Final		
Athlete	Event	Run 1	Run 2	Average	Rank	Run 1	Run 2	Rank
Adrian Miko	Men's park	22.66	N/A	11.33	29	Did not advance		
Tomas Tohol	Men's park	70.00	72.16	71.08	15	Did not advance		

Women

Athlete	Event	Seeding				Final		
Athlete	Event	Run 1	Run 2	Average	Rank	Run 1	Run 2	Rank
Naomi Vojtechovská	Women's park	43.00	45.33	44.16	9 Q	44.66	~~9.33~~	9
Lucia Čajková	Women's park	34.66	17.33	25.99	13	Did not advance		

== Fencing ==
Teams

Athletes	Event	Quarter-final	Semi-final	Final	Rank
Cedrik Serri; Árpád Fazekas; Ákos Pirk	Men's team foil	Croatia; L 45–33	Did not advance		

Individuals

Athlete	Event	Groupe Stage	Round of 64	Round of 32	Round of 16	Quarterfinals	Semifinals	Final / BM
Athlete	Event	Rank	Opposition Result	Opposition Result	Opposition Result	Opposition Result	Opposition Result	Rank
Lukas Jakub Johanides	Men's Epeé	66	Ferot (BEL); L 10–15	Did not advance				
Alex Vladimír Duduc	Men's Epeé	42	Bye	Hauri (SUI); W 15–12	Golobic (SLO); W 15–13	Bargues (ESP); L 11–15	Did not advance	
Cedrik Serri	Men's Foil	36	Mepstead (GBR); L 12–15	Did not advance				
Árpád Fazekas	Men's Foil	59	Did not advance					
Ákos Pirk	Men's Foil	69	Did not advance					
Leopold-Marc Kuchta	Men's Foil	49	Szemes (HUN); L 7–15	Did not advance				
Gaia Cantucciová	Women's Foil	37	Did not advance					

== Karate ==
Athlete	Event	Group stage			Semifinal	Final / BM	
Athlete	Event	Opposition Score	Opposition Score	Opposition Score	Opposition Score	Opposition Score	Rank
Ingrida Bakos Suchánková	Women's kumite 61 kg	Mangiacapra (ITA); L 1-2	Serogina (UKR); L 2-3	Nilsson (SWE); W 4-0	Did not advance		

== Kickboxing ==
Athlete	Event	Quarterfinals	Semifinals	Final	
Athlete	Event	Opposition Result	Opposition Result	Opposition Result	Rank
Filip Barák	Men's full contact -63.5 kg	Aghamoghlanov (AZE); L 0-3	Did not advance		
Sebastián Fapšo	Men's full contact -86 kg	Ivaniadze (GEO); L 0-3	Did not advance		
Michaela Góralczyková	Women's Pointfighting -60 kg	Gulec (TUR); L 18-22	Did not advance		
Barbora Mayerová	Women's full contact -60 kg	Straume (NOR); L 0-3	Did not advance		
Alexandra Filipová	Women's full contact -70 kg	Sodjinou (GER); L 1-2	Did not advance		

== Muaythai ==
Athlete	Event	Quarterfinal	Semi-final	Repechage	Final	
Athlete	Event	Opposition Result	Opposition Result	Opposition Result	Opposition Result	Rank
Monika Chochlíková	Women's 51 kg	Turan (TUR); L 27-30	Did not advance			

== Shooting ==
Men

Athlete	Event	Qualification		Ranking Match		Final	
Athlete	Event	Points	Rank	Points	Rank	Opponent	Rank
Juraj Tužinský	10 m air pistol	568	32	Did not advance			
Patrik Jány	10 m air rifle	627.8	17	Did not advance			
Štefan Šulek	10 m air rifle	625.8	27	Did not advance			
Patrik Jány	50 m air rifle three positions	585	22	Did not advance			
Ondrej Holko	50 m air rifle three positions	582	29	Did not advance			
Erik Varga	Trap	119	20	Did not advance			
Adrián Drobný	Trap	120	15	Did not advance			
Erik Varga; Adrián Drobný; Marián Kovačócy	Team trap	218	2 Q	N/A		Croatia; L 3–7	2nd place, silver medalist(s)

Women

Athlete	Event	Qualification		Ranking Match		Final	
Athlete	Event	Points	Rank	Points	Rank	Opponent	Rank
Lenka Gajanová	25 m pistol	570	24	Did not advance			
Kamila Novotná	10 m air rifle	629.8	6 Q	260.8	1 Q	Christen (SUI); L 13–17	2nd place, silver medalist(s)
Daniela Demjén Pešková	10 m air rifle	624.9	25	Did not advance			
Kamila Novotná	50 m air rifle three positions	586	10	Did not advance			
Daniela Demjén Pešková	50 m air rifle three positions	577	31	Did not advance			
Jana Špotáková	Trap	119	4 Q	22	1 Q	17	3rd place, bronze medalist(s)
Emma Kortišová	Trap	107	26	Did not advance			
Danka Barteková	Skeet	119	9	Did not advance			
Vanesa Hocková	Skeet	118	10	Did not advance			
Danka Barteková; Vanesa Hocková; Monika Štribravá	Team skeet	216	1 Q	N/A		Italy; L 1–7	2nd place, silver medalist(s)

Mixed

Athlete	Event	Qualification		Final	
Athlete	Event	Points	Rank	Points	Rank
Kamila Novotná; Patrik Jány	Team 10 m air rifle	624.9	22	Did not advance	
Daniela Demjén Pešková; Štefan Šulek	Team 10 m air rifle	621.5	29	Did not advance	
Daniela Demjén Pešková; Patrik Jány	Team 50 m rifle three positions	871	13	Did not advance	
Kamila Novotná; Štefan Šulek	Team 50 m rifle three positions	864	23	Did not advance	
Adrián Drobný; Jana Špotáková	Team trap	141	8	Did not advance	

== Ski Jumping ==
Men

- Hektor Kapustík

=== Women ===
Athlete	Event	1st Round		Final Round	
Athlete	Event	Result	Rank	Result	Rank
Tamara Mesíková	Normal hill	61.5	32	Did not advance	

== Sport climbing ==
Lead

Athlete	Event	Semifinal		Final	
Athlete	Event	Time	Rank	Time	Rank
Martin Matúšek	Men's lead	27+	18	Did not advance	
Sára Šimeková	Women's lead	23+	15	Did not advance	

== Table tennis ==
Men

Athlete	Event	Round 1	Round 2	Round of 32	Round of 16	Quarterfinals	Semifinals	Final / BM	
Athlete	Event	Opposition Result	Opposition Result	Opposition Result	Opposition Result	Opposition Result	Opposition Result	Opposition Result	Rank
Ľubomír Pištej	Singles	Bye	Naumi (FIN); W 4–0	Moregaurdh (SWE); L 0–4	Did not advance				
Yang Wang	Singles	Bye		Stoyanov (ITA); L 0–4	Did not advance				
Ľubomír Pištej; Yang Wang; Jakub Zelinka; Alexander Valuch	Team	—			Slovenia; W 3–0	Sweden; L 3–0	Did not advance		

Women

Athlete	Event	Round 1	Round 2	Round of 32	Round of 16	Quarterfinals	Semifinals	Final / BM	
Athlete	Event	Opposition Result	Opposition Result	Opposition Result	Opposition Result	Opposition Result	Opposition Result	Opposition Result	Rank
Tatiana Kukuľková	Singles	Bye		Brateyko (UKR); L 1–4	Did not advance				
Barbora Balážová	Singles	Bye		Malobabić (CRO); L 1–4	Did not advance				
Tatiana Kukuľková; Barbora Balážová; Ema Labošová; Nikoleta Puchovanová	Team	—			Sweden; L 2–3	Did not advance			

Mixed

Athlete	Event	Round 1	Round 2	Round of 32	Round of 16	Quarterfinals	Semifinals	Final / BM	
Athlete	Event	Opposition Result	Opposition Result	Opposition Result	Opposition Result	Opposition Result	Opposition Result	Opposition Result	Rank
Ľubomír Pištej; Barbora Balážová	Doubles	—			Pitchford / Ho (GBR); W 3–1	Ecseki / Madarasz (HUN); L 0–3	Did not advance		

== Taekwondo ==
Women

Athlete	Event	Round of 16	Quarterfinals	Semifinals	Repechage	Bronze medal	Final	
Athlete	Event	Opposition Result	Opposition Result	Opposition Result	Opposition Result	Opposition Result	Opposition Result	Rank
Gabriela Briškárová	53 kg	Hronová (CZE); L 0–2	Did not advance					

== Teqball ==
Athlete	Event	Round 1	Round 2	Round 3	Quarterfinals	Semifinals	Final / BM	
Athlete	Event	Opposition Score	Opposition Score	Opposition Score	Opposition Score	Opposition Score	Opposition Score	Rank
Marián Badár	Men's singles	Pinheiro (POR); L 0-2	Gyoergydeak (ROM); L 0-2	N/A	Did not advance			
Adriana Kecerová	Women's singles	Barabasi (ROM); L 0-2	Couto (POR); L 0-2	Buřvalová (CZE); L 0-2	Did not advance			
Branislav Rodman; Marián Badár	Men's doubles	Sagsyan / Verdanyan (ARM); L 2-0	Gyoergydeak / Ilyes (ROM); L 2-0	N/A	Did not advance			
Karina Zušťáková; Adriana Kecerová	Women's doubles	Julian / Lanche (FRA); L 0-2	Kristensen / Dahlmann (DEN); L 0-2	Hillmann / Gloeckner (GER); L 1-2	Did not advance			
Branislav Rodman; Karina Zušťáková	Mixed doubles	Ilyes / Dako (ROM); W 2-0	Beyer / Lanche (FRA); W 2-0	Pokwap / Bartnicka (POL); L 0-2	Katsz / Vasas (HUN); L 0-2	Did not advance		

== Triathlon ==
Athlete	Event	Swim (1.5 km)	Trans 1	Bike (40 km)	Trans 2	Run (10 km)	Total Time	Rank
Richard Varga	Men's individual	18:39	0:55	56:30	0:38	DNF		
Peter Rojtáš	Men's individual	18:26	0:50	1:00:02	0:39	35:45	1:55:41	51
Romana Gajdošová	Women's individual	20:56	0:55	1:04:19	0:31	38:16	2:04:55	36
Ivana Kuriačková	Women's individual	20:41	0:59	1:04:34	0:32	37:07	2:03:50	30
Zuzana Michaličková	Women's individual	19:44	0:54	1:01:28	0:32	35:40	1:58:16	12
Richard Varga; Peter Rojtáš; Romana Gajdošová; Ivana Kuriačková	Mixed relay	—					1:09:19	10
