= Triathlon at the 2024 Summer Olympics – Qualification =

This article details the qualifying phase for triathlon at the 2024 Summer Olympics. The competition at these Games will comprise a total of 110 athletes coming from their respective National Olympic Committees (NOCs) with a maximum of three per gender. All athletes must undergo a qualifying pathway to earn a spot for the Games through the World Triathlon Mixed Relay Championships (2022 and 2023), the Olympic Qualification Event, the Continental Qualification, and the Olympic Qualification List which began on 27 May 2022 and then concludes two years later on the same date.

== Summary ==
Ten NOCs will each earn four quota spots (two per gender) through the mixed relay qualification pathway. As the host country, France reserves four quota places (two per gender) while the highest-ranked eligible NOC will each obtain two men's and two women's spots at the 2022 and 2023 Mixed Relay World Championships. The six highest-ranked NOCs will be allocated the same number of places based on the World Triathlon mixed relay rankings of 25 March 2024 with the remaining two teams notching the Olympic quota places through the Mixed Relay Olympic Qualification Event to be held between 15 April to 27 May 2024.

The individual rankings of 27 May 2024 will provide 31 athletes in each gender with the coveted quota places. Twenty-six of them will be sequentially allocated to the highest-ranked triathletes, subject to a limit of three per NOC (if all three are placed inside the top 30) or two per NOC (if the third would be placed outside the top 30). Any NOC qualifying through the mixed relay must ignore its two highest-ranked triathletes in each gender. One additional spot per continent will be assigned to the highest-ranked remaining triathlete whose NOC has not yet qualified for any quota places. A team consisting of two individuals in both the men's and women's events will be eligible to join the ten previously qualified teams in the mixed relay event.

The final two spots per gender are awarded to the triathletes under the Tripartite Commission and to those eligible in the top 180 of the World Triathlon individual rankings.

NOC	Men	Women	Mixed	Total
Argentina		1		1
Australia	2	2	Yes	4
Austria	2	2	Yes	4
Azerbaijan	1			1
Barbados	1			1
Belgium	2	2	Yes	4
Bermuda	1	2		3
Brazil	2	2	Yes	4
Canada	2	1		3
Chile	2			2
China		1		1
Colombia		1		1
Czech Republic		1		1
Denmark	1	1		2
Ecuador		1		1
France	3	3	Yes	6
Germany	3	3	Yes	6
Great Britain	2	3	Yes	5
Guam		1		1
Hong Kong	1			1
Hungary	2	1		3
Iceland		1		1
Israel	1			1
Italy	2	3	Yes	5
Japan	2	1		3
Kazakhstan		1		1
Luxembourg		1		1
Mauritius	1			1
Mexico	2	2	Yes	4
Morocco	1			1
Netherlands	2	2	Yes	4
New Zealand	2	2	Yes	4
Norway	2	2	Yes	4
Poland		1		1
Portugal	2	2	Yes	4
Romania	1			1
Spain	3	2	Yes	5
South Africa	2	1		3
Sweden		1		1
Switzerland	2	2	Yes	4
Togo	1			1
United States	2	3	Yes	5
Total: 42 NOCs	54	55	16	110

== Timeline ==
Event	Date	Venue
2022 World Triathlon Mixed Relay Championships	June 26, 2022	(Canada) Montreal
2023 World Triathlon Mixed Relay Championships	July 15–16, 2023	(Germany) Hamburg
Mixed Relay Olympic Qualification Rankings	March 25, 2024	—
2024 World Triathlon Mixed Relay Olympic Qualification Event	May 17, 2024	(Mexico) Huatulco
Individual Olympic Qualification Rankings	May 27, 2024	—

== Men's ==
Event	Places	Qualified NOC	Selected triathlete
Host nation	2	France	Dorian Coninx
Host nation	2	France	Pierre Le Corre
2022 World Triathlon Mixed Relay Championships	2	Great Britain	Alex Yee
2022 World Triathlon Mixed Relay Championships	2	Great Britain	Sam Dickinson
2023 World Triathlon Mixed Relay Championships	2	Germany	Lasse Lührs
2023 World Triathlon Mixed Relay Championships	2	Germany	Tim Hellwig
Mixed Relay Qualification Rankings	12	Australia	Matthew Hauser
Mixed Relay Qualification Rankings	12	Australia	Luke Willian
Mixed Relay Qualification Rankings	12	Italy	Alessio Crociani
Mixed Relay Qualification Rankings	12	Italy	Gianluca Pozzatti
Mixed Relay Qualification Rankings	12	New Zealand	Hayden Wilde
Mixed Relay Qualification Rankings	12	New Zealand	Dylan McCullough
Mixed Relay Qualification Rankings	12	Portugal	Vasco Vilaça
Mixed Relay Qualification Rankings	12	Portugal	Ricardo Batista
Mixed Relay Qualification Rankings	12	Switzerland	Adrien Briffod
Mixed Relay Qualification Rankings	12	Switzerland	Max Studer
Mixed Relay Qualification Rankings	12	United States	Morgan Pearson
Mixed Relay Qualification Rankings	12	United States	Seth Rider
2024 World Triathlon Mixed Relay Qualification Event	4	Norway	Kristian Blummenfelt
2024 World Triathlon Mixed Relay Qualification Event	4	Norway	Vetle Bergsvik Thorn
2024 World Triathlon Mixed Relay Qualification Event	4	Netherlands	Richard Murray
2024 World Triathlon Mixed Relay Qualification Event	4	Netherlands	Mitch Kolkman
Individual Olympic Rankings	26	Hungary	Csongor Lehmann
Individual Olympic Rankings	26	Belgium	Jelle Geens
Individual Olympic Rankings	26	Brazil	Manoel Messias
Individual Olympic Rankings	26	France	Léo Bergère
Individual Olympic Rankings	26	Spain	Antonio Serrat Seoane
Individual Olympic Rankings	26	Brazil	Miguel Hidalgo
Individual Olympic Rankings	26	Japan	Makoto Odakura
Individual Olympic Rankings	26	Germany	Jonas Schomburg
Individual Olympic Rankings	26	Canada	Charles Paquet
Individual Olympic Rankings	26	Spain	Roberto Sánchez Mantecón
Individual Olympic Rankings	26	Canada	Tyler Mislawchuk
Individual Olympic Rankings	26	Belgium	Marten Van Riel
Individual Olympic Rankings	26	Hungary	Bence Bicsák
Individual Olympic Rankings	26	Spain	Alberto González García
Individual Olympic Rankings	26	Morocco	Jawad Abdelmoula
Individual Olympic Rankings	26	Japan	Kenji Nener
Individual Olympic Rankings	26	Chile	Diego Moya
Individual Olympic Rankings	26	Israel	Shachar Sagiv
Individual Olympic Rankings	26	Mexico	Aram Peñaflor
Individual Olympic Rankings	26	Azerbaijan	Rostyslav Pevtsov
Individual Olympic Rankings	26	South Africa	Jamie Riddle
Individual Olympic Rankings	26	Mexico	Crisanto Grajales
Individual Olympic Rankings	26	Austria	Alois Knabl
Individual Olympic Rankings	26	Denmark	Emil Holm
Individual Olympic Rankings	26	South Africa	Henri Schoeman
Individual Olympic Rankings	26	Austria	Tjebbe Kaindl
Individual Olympic Rankings – Africa	1	Mauritius	Jean Gaël Laurent L'Entete
Individual Olympic Rankings – America	1	Barbados	Matthew Wright
Individual Olympic Rankings – Asia	1	Hong Kong	Jason Tai Long Ng
Individual Olympic Rankings – Europe	1	Romania	Felix Duchampt
Individual Olympic Rankings – Oceania	0	—N/a	
Tripartite Commission	2	Bermuda	Tyler Smith
Tripartite Commission	2	Togo	Eloi Adjavon
Re-allocation of unused quota place	1	Chile	Gaspar Riveros
Total	55		

== Women's ==
Event	Places	Qualified NOC	Selected triathlete
Host nation	2	France	Cassandre Beaugrand
Host nation	2	France	Emma Lombardi
2022 World Triathlon Mixed Relay Championships	2	Great Britain	Beth Potter
2022 World Triathlon Mixed Relay Championships	2	Great Britain	Georgia Taylor-Brown
2023 World Triathlon Mixed Relay Championships	2	Germany	Lisa Tertsch
2023 World Triathlon Mixed Relay Championships	2	Germany	Laura Lindemann
Mixed Relay Qualification Rankings	12	Australia	Sophie Linn
Mixed Relay Qualification Rankings	12	Australia	Natalie Van Coevorden
Mixed Relay Qualification Rankings	12	Italy	Bianca Seregni
Mixed Relay Qualification Rankings	12	Italy	Verena Steinhauser
Mixed Relay Qualification Rankings	12	New Zealand	Nicole van der Kaay
Mixed Relay Qualification Rankings	12	New Zealand	Ainsley Thorpe
Mixed Relay Qualification Rankings	12	Portugal	Melanie Santos
Mixed Relay Qualification Rankings	12	Portugal	Maria Tomé
Mixed Relay Qualification Rankings	12	Switzerland	Julie Derron
Mixed Relay Qualification Rankings	12	Switzerland	Cathia Schär
Mixed Relay Qualification Rankings	12	United States	Taylor Knibb
Mixed Relay Qualification Rankings	12	United States	Taylor Spivey
2024 World Triathlon Mixed Relay Qualification Event	4	Norway	Solveig Løvseth
2024 World Triathlon Mixed Relay Qualification Event	4	Norway	Lotte Miller
2024 World Triathlon Mixed Relay Qualification Event	4	Netherlands	Rachel Klamer
2024 World Triathlon Mixed Relay Qualification Event	4	Netherlands	Maya Kingma
Individual Olympic Rankings	26	Great Britain	Kate Waugh
Individual Olympic Rankings	26	Luxembourg	Jeanne Lehair
Individual Olympic Rankings	26	Germany	Nina Eim
Individual Olympic Rankings	26	France	Léonie Périault
Individual Olympic Rankings	26	United States	Kirsten Kasper
Individual Olympic Rankings	26	Mexico	Lizeth Rueda
Individual Olympic Rankings	26	Spain	Miriam Casillas
Individual Olympic Rankings	26	Bermuda	Flora Duffy
Individual Olympic Rankings	26	Japan	Yuko Takahashi
Individual Olympic Rankings	26	Italy	Alice Betto
Individual Olympic Rankings	26	Belgium	Claire Michel
Individual Olympic Rankings	26	Brazil	Vittória Lopes
Individual Olympic Rankings	26	Brazil	Djenyfer Arnold
Individual Olympic Rankings	26	Denmark	Alberte Kjær Pedersen
Individual Olympic Rankings	26	Belgium	Jolien Vermeylen
Individual Olympic Rankings	26	Spain	Anna Godoy Conteras
Individual Olympic Rankings	26	Mexico	Rosa Tapia
Individual Olympic Rankings	26	Canada	Emy Legault
Individual Olympic Rankings	26	China	Lin Xinyu
Individual Olympic Rankings	26	Hungary	Zsanett Bragmayer
Individual Olympic Rankings	26	Sweden	Tilda Månsson
Individual Olympic Rankings	26	Colombia	Carolina Velásquez
Individual Olympic Rankings	26	Austria	Julia Hauser
Individual Olympic Rankings	26	Ecuador	Elizabeth Bravo
Individual Olympic Rankings	26	Austria	Lisa Perterer
Individual Olympic Rankings	26	Czech Republic	Petra Kuříková
Individual Olympic Rankings – Africa	1	South Africa	Vicky van der Merwe
Individual Olympic Rankings – America	1	Argentina	Romina Biagioli
Individual Olympic Rankings – Asia	1	Kazakhstan	Ekaterina Shabalina
Individual Olympic Rankings – Europe	1	Poland	Roksana Słupek
Individual Olympic Rankings – Oceania	1	Guam	Manami Iijima
Tripartite Commission	1	Iceland	Edda Hannesdóttir
Reallocation of unused quota	1	Bermuda	Erica Hawley
Total	55		
