= Vetle Bergsvik Thorn =

Norwegian triathlete (born 1999)

Vetle Thorn
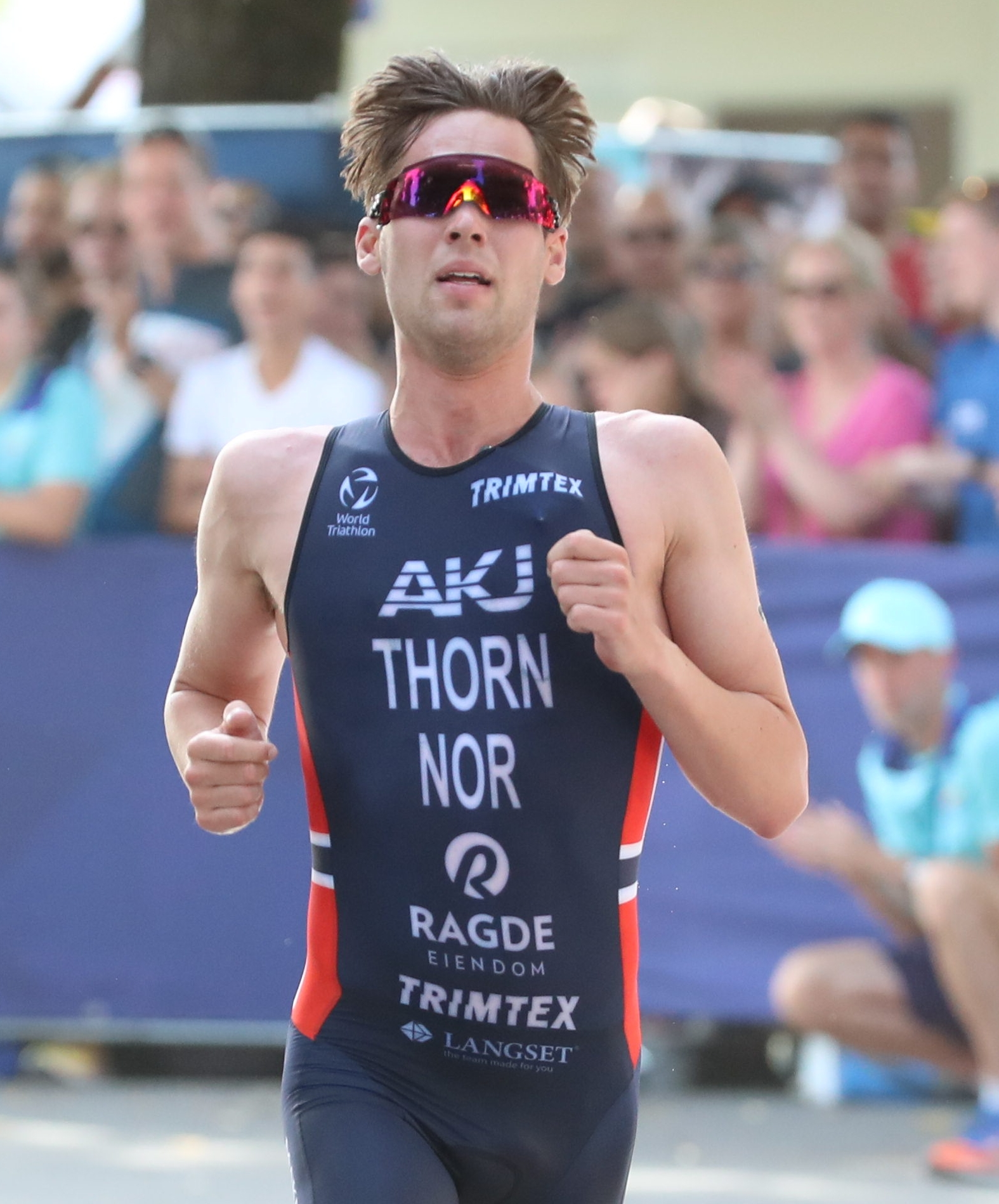
- Thorn in 2022

Personal information
- Full name: Vetle Bergsvik Thorn
- Nationality: Norwegian
- Born: 22 May 1999 (age 27) Bergen, Norway

Sport
- Sport: Triathlon
Medal record
Men's triathlon
Representing Norway
European Games
Gold medal – first place	2023 Kraków-Małopolska	Individual
Gold medal – first place	2023 Kraków-Małopolska	Mixed relay

Vetle Bergsvik Thorn (born 22 May 1999) is a Norwegian triathlete. His achievements include two gold medals at the 2023 European Games, in men's individual competition and in the mixed relay. He also competed for Norway at the 2024 Summer Olympics, finishing 17th in the men's triathlon event.

== Biography ==
Thorn was born in 1999.

He won a gold medal in the men's individual competition at the 2023 European Games in Poland, one second ahead of silver medal winner Israeli Shachar Sagiv. He was also part of the Norwegian winning team in the mixed relay at the 2023 European Games, along with Lotte Miller, Casper Stornes and Solveig Løvseth.
