= Solveig Løvseth =

Norwegian triathlete (born 1999)

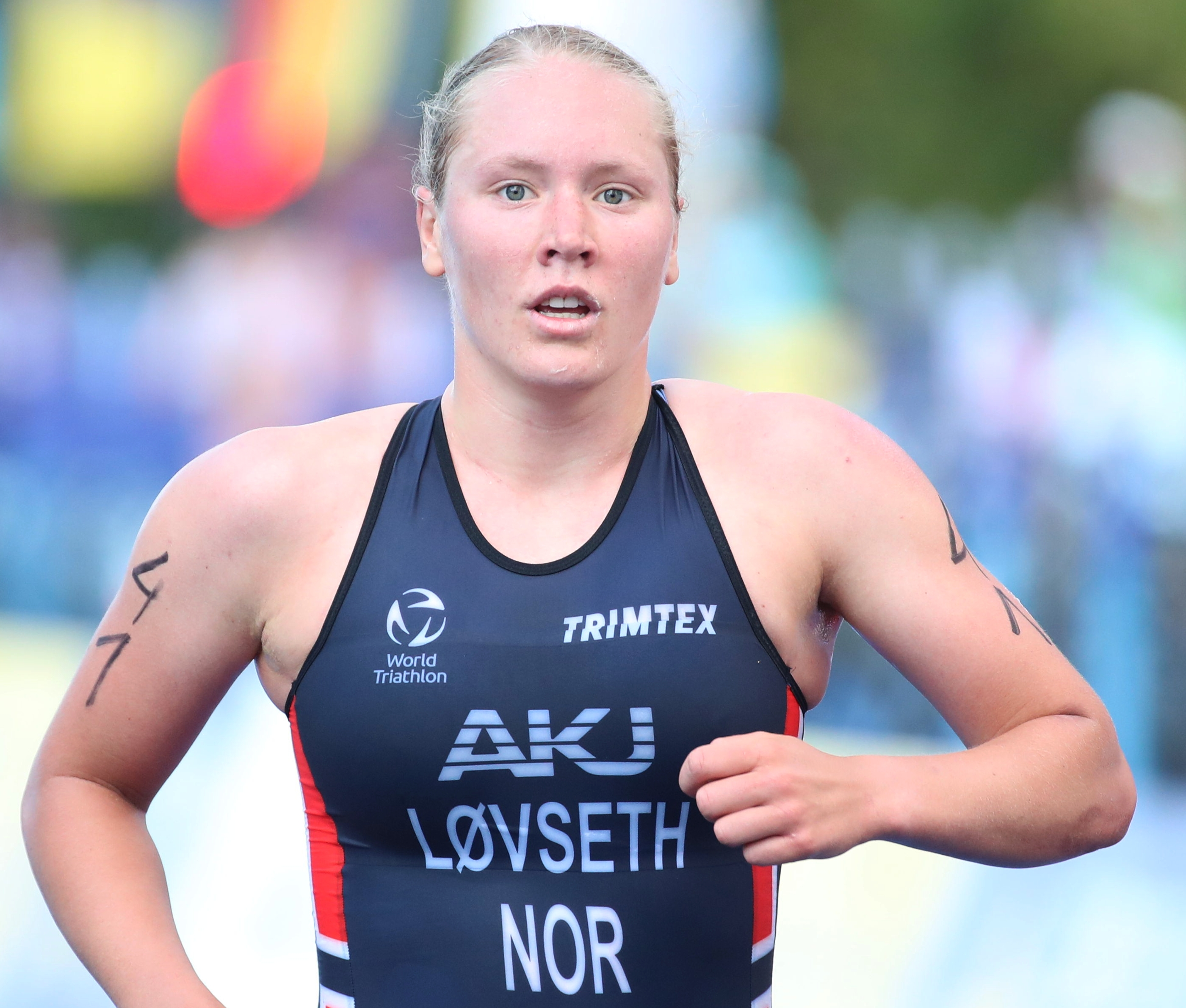

Personal information
- Full name: Solveig Natvig Løvseth
- Nationality: Norwegian
- Born: 14 July 1999 (age 26)

Sport
- Sport: Triathlon
- Club: Trondhjems Svømme- og livredningsklub
Medal record
Women's triathlon
Representing Norway
European Games
Gold medal – first place	2023 Kraków-Małopolska	Individual
Gold medal – first place	2023 Kraków-Małopolska	Mixed relay
Ironman World Championship
Gold medal – first place	2025 Hawaii, USA	Individual

Solveig Natvig Løvseth (born 14 July 1999) is a Norwegian triathlete. Her achievements include 2025 IRONMAN World Champion, two gold medals at the 2023 European Games, in women's individual competition and in the mixed relay. She competed in the women's triathlon at the 2024 Summer Olympics in Paris, France.

== Biography ==
Løvseth was born in 1999, and hails from Trondheim. She competes for the club Trondhjems Svømme- og livredningsklub.

She won a gold medal in the women's individual competition at the 2023 European Games in Poland, ahead of Julia Hauser. She was also part of the Norwegian winning team in the mixed relay at the 2023 European Games, along with Vetle Bergsvik Thorn, Lotte Miller, and Casper Stornes.

She won a gold medal at the 2025 Ironman World Championship in Hawaii. She was awarded the Olavstatuetten trophy in 2025, regarded as the highest sports honour for people from the Trøndelag region.

In June 2026 Løvseth won the European Ironman championship in Hamburg.
