= Audrey Merle =

French triathlete (born 1995)

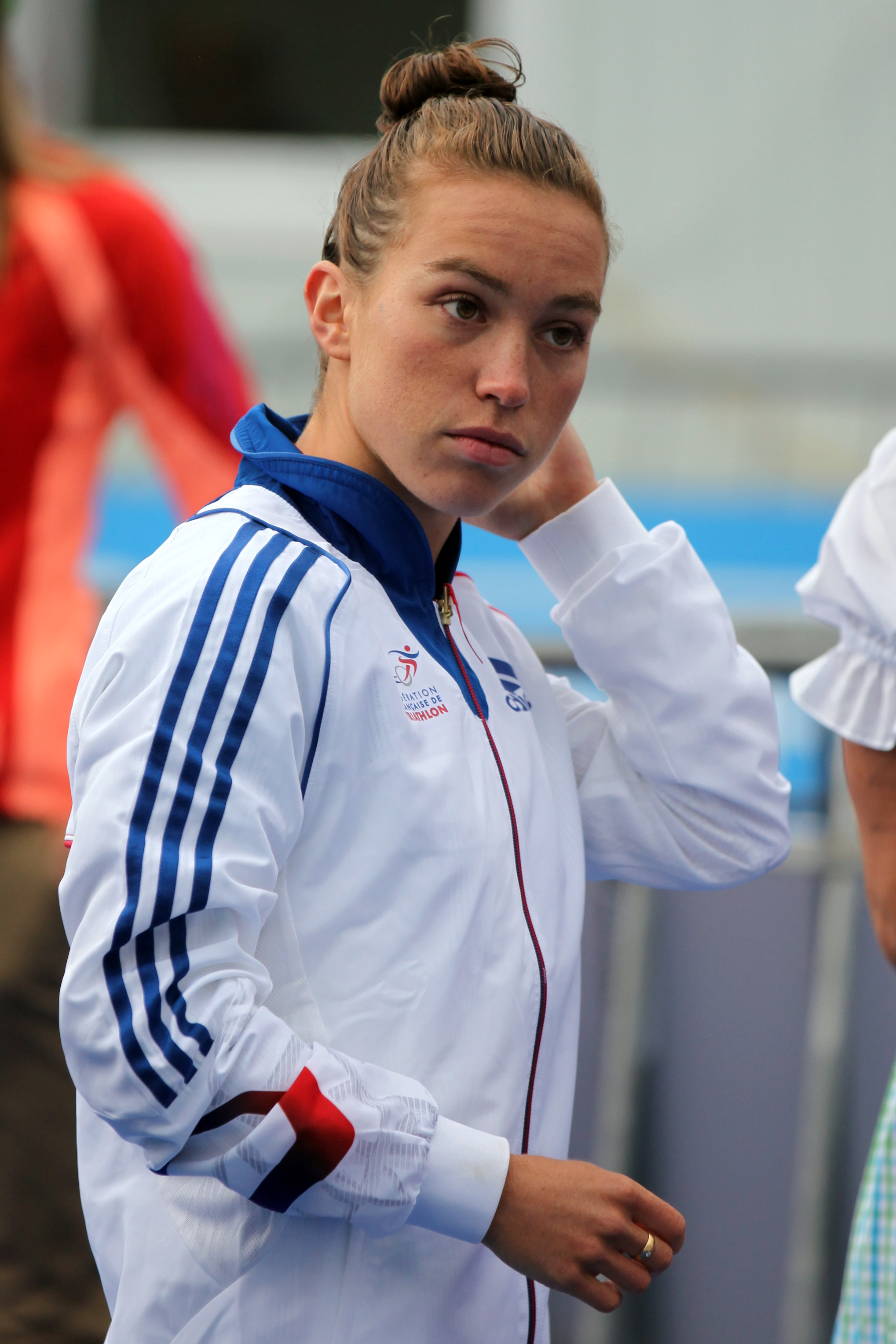
- Audrey Merle in 2014

Personal information
- Born: 19 May 1995 (age 31)

Sport
- Sport: Triathlon

Audrey Merle (born 19 May 1995) is a French triathlete. In 2016, she was named in the French team for the 2016 Summer Olympics.
