= Sian Rainsley =

British triathlete (born 1997)

Personal information
- Born: 19 April 1997 (age 29)
- Home town: Coventry

Sport
- Country: Great Britain
- Sport: Triathlon
Medal record
Women's triathlon
Representing Great Britain
European Games
Silver medal – second place	2023 Kraków-Małopolska	Mixed relay

Sian Rainsley (born 19 April 1997) is a British triathlete.

She competed at the 2014 Youth Olympic Games winning a silver medal, 2021 European Triathlon Championships winning a bronze medal, 2022 World Triathlon Championship Series Leeds finishing 15th, and 2022 World Triathlon Championship Series Hamburg, finishing first.

In the 2024 World Triathlon Cup, where Rainsley was awarded a gold medal, the national anthem of Spain was played instead of the British.

She was named to the 2022 Commonwealth Games, team England. She came 12th in the women's event.

She was diagnosed with Crohn's Disease.
