= Lotte Miller =

Norwegian triathlete (born 1996)

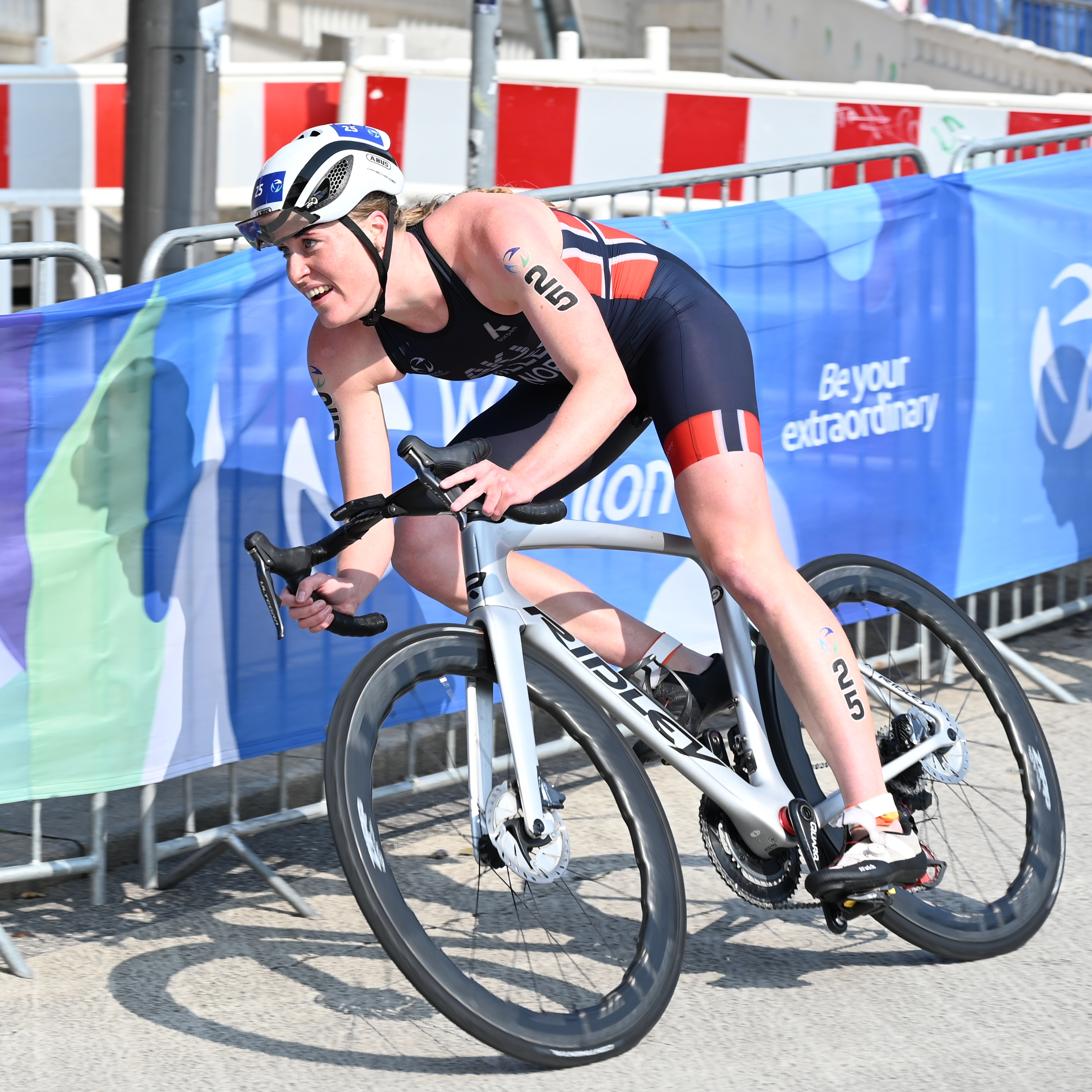

Personal information
- Nationality: Norwegian
- Born: 25 January 1996 (age 30) Stavanger, Norway

Sport
- Sport: Triathlon
- Club: Bryne Triatlonklubb
Medal record
Women's triathlon
Representing Norway
European Games
Gold medal – first place	2023 Kraków-Małopolska	Mixed relay

Lotte Miller (born 25 January 1996) is a Norwegian triathlete,

== Biography ==
Born in Stavanger, Miller represented Norway at the 2020 Summer Olympics in Tokyo 2021, competing in triathlon.

In 2015, she competed in the women's event at the 2015 European Games held in Baku, Azerbaijan. She was part of the winning team in the mixed relay at the 2023 European Games, she had the second leg, following Vetle Bergsvik Thorn on the first leg, followed by Casper Stornes on third leg, and Solveig Løvseth on the last leg.

Miller won national titles in triathlon in 2017 and 2018, both in the normal and sprint distances.

She competed in the women's triathlon at the 2024 Summer Olympics in Paris, France.
