= Carolyn Hayes =

Irish triathlete (born 1988)

Personal information
- Nationality: Irish
- Born: 1 March 1988 (age 37)
- Home town: Newcastlewest, County Limerick

Sport
- Country: Ireland
- Sport: Triathlon

Carolyn Hayes (born 1 March 1988 in Newcastle West) is an Irish triathlete.

She competed in the women's event at the 2020 Summer Olympics, as the only Irish triathlete in the event. Formerly a water polo player, she only began competing in the triathlon in her 20s, putting a medical career on hold to train for the Olympics beginning in 2018. She was inspired to compete in the Olympics by the 2012 performances of British triathletes Alistair Brownlee and Jonny Brownlee. She finished 23rd in the event.
