= Casper Stornes =

Norwegian triathlete (born 1997)

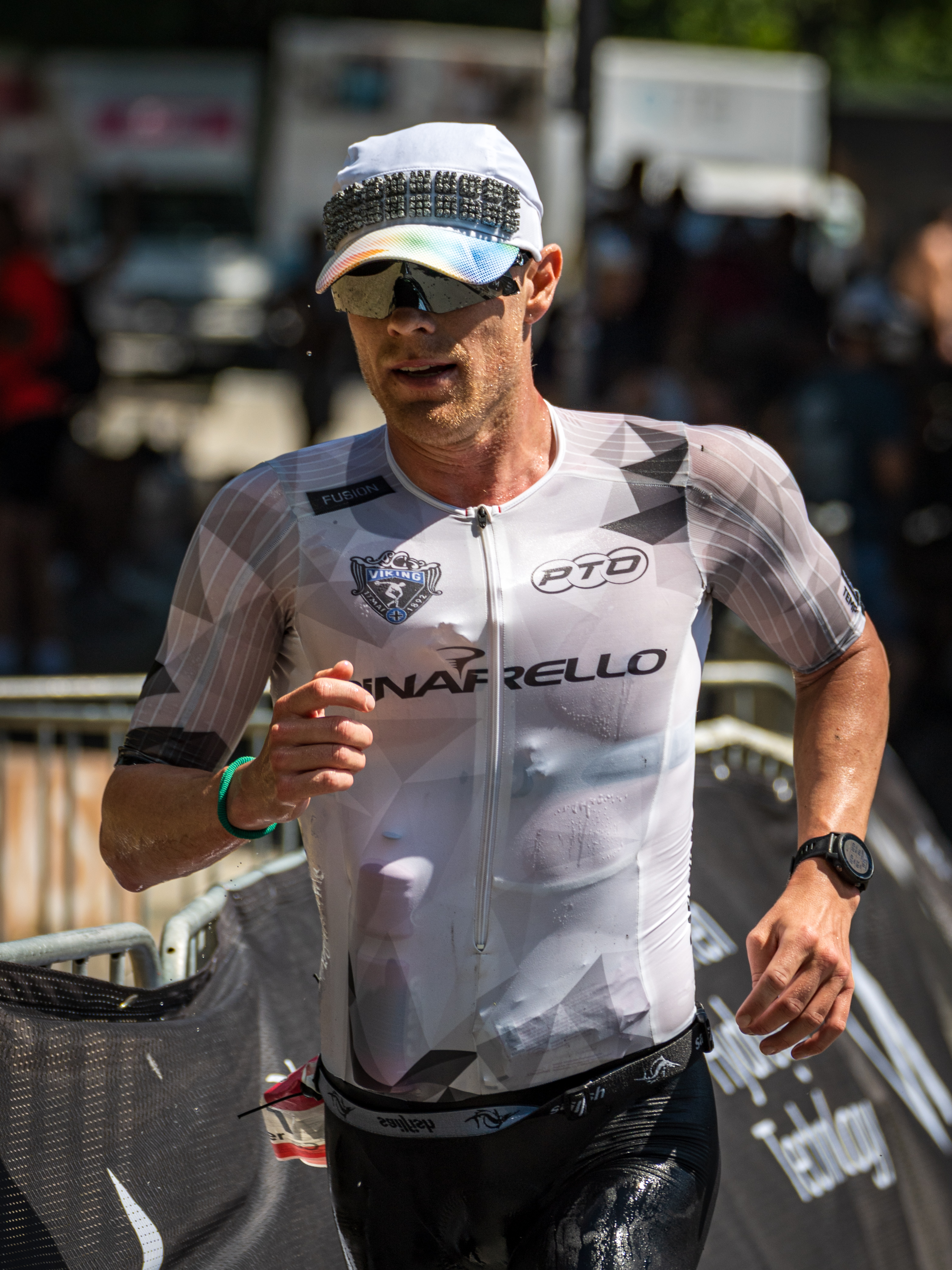
- Casper Stornes in 2025

Personal information
- Nationality: Norwegian
- Born: 6 February 1997 (age 29) Askøy Municipality, Norway

Sport
- Sport: Triathlon
Medal record
Representing Norway
Ironman World Championship
Gold medal – first place	2025	Elite
Ironman 70.3 World Championship
Bronze medal – third place	2025	Elite
World Triathlon Championship Series
Gold medal – first place	2018 Bermuda	Elite
Silver medal – second place	2019 Yokohama	Elite
European Games
Gold medal – first place	2023 Kraków-Małopolska	Mixed relay
European Championships
Bronze medal – third place	2024 Vichy	Elite
Ironman 70.3 Middle East Championship
Bronze medal – third place	2019 Bahrain	Elite
Bronze medal – third place	2018 Bahrain	Elite

Casper Stornes (born 6 February 1997) is a Norwegian triathlete and Ironman World Champion, competing at short course (sprint and standard distance), 70.3 (half-Ironman) and 140.6 (Ironman) distances. He won the Ironman World Championship in 2025, becoming one of the leading Norwegian athletes in long-distance triathlon.

Stornes first rose to prominence after winning the World Triathlon Championship Series race in Bermuda in 2018, finishing ahead of compatriots Kristian Blummenfelt and Gustav Iden. The result marked the first time athletes from a single nation swept the podium in a World Triathlon Series event.

== Career ==
Stornes is part of the successful Norwegian triathlon training group alongside Kristian Blummenfelt and Gustav Iden. He achieved his first major international victory at the 2018 World Triathlon Championship Series race in Bermuda, leading a historic Norwegian 1–2–3 finish.

In 2018, Stornes also finished third at the Ironman 70.3 Middle East Championship in Bahrain. The following year, he repeated this result with another bronze medal at the 2019 edition of the same race.

During this period, Stornes competed regularly on the World Triathlon Championship Series circuit, achieving several top finishes and establishing himself among the leading Norwegian triathletes of his generation.

After the disruption caused by the COVID-19 pandemic in 2020, Stornes continued to compete at both short- and middle-distance events, including World Triathlon races, Super League Triathlon, and Ironman 70.3 competitions.

Stornes won a gold medal in the mixed relay at the 2023 European Games in Kraków-Małopolska.

In 2024, he won a bronze medal at the European Triathlon Championships in Vichy.

In 2025, Stornes achieved the biggest victory of his career by winning the Ironman World Championship in Nice. The victory formed part of a Norwegian podium sweep at the Ironman World Championship, with compatriots Gustav Iden and Kristian Blummenfelt also finishing on the podium, marking a historic achievement for Norway in long-distance triathlon. Later in 2025, Stornes achieved a podium finish at the Ironman 70.3 World Championship, placing third in the elite men's race.
