= 2023 European Athletics Team Championships Third Division =

Below are the full startlists and, when confirmed, results of the 2023 European Athletics Team Championships Third Division on 20–22 June 2023 in Kraków, Poland. This edition marks the first time all divisions of the Championships had been held at a single venue. European Athletics released the full and final startlists on 16 June 2023, one week before the event.

For the first time, medals were also awarded for individual performances across all three divisions, as part of the 2023 European Games. Despite being the lowest of the three divisions in competition, three overall 2023 European Games medals, including one gold medal, were won by third Division athletes; gold for Luiza Gega of Albania in 3000 metre steeplechase, to add to her European Athletics Championships gold of 2022, and bronze for Sarah Lavin of Ireland in 100 metres hurdles, and Victoria Hudson of Austria in Javelin.

== Format ==
The winner of each individual discipline and each relay shall score 15 points, the second will score one fewer, and so on. National teams, athletes or relay teams with no valid performance, disqualified or not finishing shall not score. If two or more athletes tie for a place in any event, the attributable points shall be divided equally between them. The team having the highest aggregate number of points shall be the winner of the match, and win a Championship plaque.

After the conclusion of the athletics program of the European Games 2023, the following relegation and promotion is to be made for the next edition of the European Athletics Team Championships in Malaga in 2025

- the three lowest ranked teams of the First Division are relegated to the Second Division.
- the three highest ranked teams of the Second Division are then promoted to the First Division.

Races below 1500 metres will be raced in two heats, with the results amalgamated to find a final order in the event. There will be no finals in these events. In races from 1500 metres upwards, one heat of 16 will take part. In the field events, each event will be broken into two pools. Both heats and pools will be seeded so that the highest ranked athletes compete together, with the exception of the final relays, which will be seeded by overall standings one hour before the event.

The Third Division represents broadly the weakest teams in European Athletics, though some teams can find themselves in the lower reaches due to relegations for previous rule breaches; Ireland find themselves in that position in 2023, having been relegated following a failure to attend the 2021 event due to coronavirus restrictions, and Scotland and Belarus are expected to begin their return in this division when their current ban is lifted.

In addition, the European 'microstates' - Gibraltar, Monaco and Liechtenstein etc take part under a composite team banner as 'Associated Athletes of Small States of Europe', These states are so listed in the overall standings, but the individual nations of the athletes are represented in the event-by-events results below. Past members such as San Marino and Andorra now compete in their own right.

Finally, as this division has some of the smaller and weaker associations, significant numbers of events, especially the technical events will not have a full field, as one or more member nations opt not to send an athlete, or has no eligible athlete to send in specific events. Such nations receive zero points in that event, whereas they would receive the minimum of a point if athletes attended. Points totals per event are calculated on total teams in the match, not on teams in each event, so that if only nine teams field a high jumper, for example, the high jump winner will still earn 15 points for his or her team.

== Schedule ==
The following is the schedule of events for the First Division match.

DAY 1 AM - 20 June			DAY 2 AM - 21 June			DAY 3 AM - 22 June		
09:50	Shot Put	W	09:40	Long Jump	M	09:40	Javelin Throw	W
10:05	400m	W	09:55	Pole Vault	W	09:55	High Jump A	M
10:10	Discus Throw	W	09:55	Pole Vault	W	09:55	High Jump B	M
10:25	Triple Jump	M	10:05	110m Hurdles	M	10:05	200m	W
10:35	400m	M	10:08	Discus Throw	M	10:25	200m	M
10:50	Shot Put F	W	10:25	100m Hurdles	W	10:28	Shot Put	M
10:55	5000m	W	10:56	Long Jump F	M	10:46	Javelin Throw F	W
11:15	Discus Throw F	W	11:02	800m	W	10:55	Long Jump	W
11:28	800m	M	11:14	Discus Throw F	M	11:05	3000m SC	W
11:35	Pole Vault A	M	11:20	1500m	M	11:28	Shot Put F	M
11:35	Pole Vault B	M	11:40	400m Hurdles	W	11:33	Javelin Throw	M
11:41	Triple Jump F	M	11:45	Triple Jump	W	11:40	5000m	M
11:55	3000m SC	M	12:00	Hammer Throw	M	11:45	High Jump A	W
12:00	Hammer Throw	W	12:05	400m Hurdles	M	11:45	High Jump B	W
12:30	100m	W	12:30	4x100m	W	12:11	Long Jump F	W
12:50	100m	M	12:50	4x100m	M	12:20	1500m	W
13:05	Hammer Throw F	W	13:01	Triple Jump F	W	12:39	Javelin Throw F	M
key: M: Men W: Women X:: Mixed			13:06	Hammer Throw F	M	12:45	4 x 400m Mixed	X

== Overall standings ==
Rank	Nation	Points	Notes
1	Ireland	494	Promoted to Second Division for 2025
2	Austria	473.50	Promoted to Second Division for 2025
3	Israel	434	Promoted to Second Division for 2025
4	Bosnia and Herzegovina	363	
5	Malta	352.50	
6	Georgia	290	
7	Andorra	269	
8	Montenegro	258	
9	Albania	257	
10	Armenia	255	
11	North Macedonia	235	
12	San Marino	192	
13	Azerbaijan	180	
14	Kosovo	150	
15	Liechtenstein	32	

== Men's events ==
Key: WR= world record - ER = European Record - EL = 2023 European lead - CR = Championships record - NR = National record - NU23R = National Under-23 record

=== 100 metres ===
Rank	Heat	Lane	Nation	Athlete	Result	Notes	Match points
1	A	4	Austria	Markus Fuchs	10.36		15
2	A	5	Ireland	Israel Olatunde	10.37		14
3	A	7	San Marino	Francesco Sansovini	10.52		13
4	A	8	Georgia	Mindia Endeladze	10.56	PB	12
5	A	3	North Macedonia	Andreas Trajkovski	10.81		11
6	A	2	Malta	Beppe Grillo	10.82		10
7	A	9	Bosnia and Herzegovina	Edhem Vikalo	10.84	SB	9
8	B	4	Andorra	Guillem Arderiu Vilanova	11.06	NU23R	8
9	B	5	Montenegro	Ognjen Marsenić	11.09	SB	7
10	B	3	Albania	Julian Vila	11.21	SB	6
11	B	6	Azerbaijan	Aleksey Aliakbarov	11.23		5
12	B	8	Kosovo	Leon Thaqi	11.46	SB	4
13	B	7	Armenia	Gor Harutyunyan	11.93	SB	3
-	A	6	Israel	Blessing Akwasi Afrifah	DQ	TR16.8	-
Wind A: +1.2 m/s B: -0.9 m/s		WR: (Jamaica) Usain Bolt - 9.58; ER: (Italy) Marcell Jacobs - 9.80 EL: (United Kingdom) Eugene Amo-Dadzie - 9.93; CR: (France) Christophe Lemaitre - 9.95					

- DNE : AASSE

=== 200 metres ===
Rank	Heat	Lane	Nation	Athlete	Result	Notes	Match points
1	A	6	Ireland	Mark Smyth	20.66		15
2	A	8	Georgia	Mindia Endeladze	20.98	PB	14
3	A	7	Austria	Markus Fuchs	20.99		13
4	A	2	Albania	Franko Burraj	21.19	NR	12
5	A	5	Malta	Beppe Grillo	21.42	PB	11
6	A	3	San Marino	Alessandro Gasperoni	21.57	PB	10
7	A	4	Israel	Aviv Koffler	21.59	SB	9
8	A	9	North Macedonia	Jovan Stojoski	21.66	SB	8
9	B	6	Montenegro	Ognjen Marsenić	22.23	SB	7
10	B	7	Azerbaijan	Aleksey Aliakbarov	22.25		6
11	B	4	Andorra	Guillem Arderiu Vilanova	22.39	PB	5
12	B	8	Bosnia and Herzegovina	Edhem Vikalo	22.54	SB	4
13	B	3	Armenia	Davit Sargsyan	23.11	SB	3
14	B	5	Kosovo	Enis Bytyqi	23.38	PB	2
Wind A: +0.5 m/s B: -1.1 m/s		WR: (Jamaica) Usain Bolt - 19.19; ER: (Italy) Pietro Mennea - 19.72 EL: (United Kingdom) Zharnel Hughes - 20.14; CR: (Turkey) Ramil Guliyev - 20.20					

- DNE : AASSE

=== 400 metres ===
Rank	Heat	Lane	Nation	Athlete	Result	Notes	Match points
1	A	6	Albania	Franko Burraj	46.30	SB	15
2	A	4	Austria	Niklas Strohmayer-Dangl	46.64	PB	14
3	A	5	Ireland	Jack Raftery	46.76		13
4	A	8	Malta	Graham Pellegrini	47.47		12
5	A	9	North Macedonia	Jovan Stojoski	47.82		11
6	A	2	Bosnia and Herzegovina	Abedin Mujezinović	47.85	SB	10
7	A	3	Israel	Eran Siboni	48.16	SB	9
8	B	5	Andorra	Pau Blasi	48.51	PB	8
9	A	7	San Marino	Alessandro Gasperoni	48.68		7
10	B	6	Azerbaijan	Javid Mammadov	49.58	PB	6
11	B	4	Kosovo	Granit Ahmeti	49.92	PB	5
12	B	7	Armenia	Davit Sargsyan	50.15	SB	4
13	B	9	Georgia	Luka Kuphunia	50.59	SB	3
14	B	8	Montenegro	Dragan Pešić	51.98	SB	2
WR: (South Africa) Wayde van Niekerk - 43.03; ER: (East Germany) Thomas Schönlebe - 44.33 EL: (Norway) HåvardIngvaldsen - 44.86; CR: (Belgium) Jonathan Borlée - 44.99

- DNE : AASSE

=== 800 metres ===
Rank	Heat	Lane	Nation	Athlete	Result	Notes	Match points
1	A	4	Bosnia and Herzegovina	Amel Tuka	1:49.25		15
2	A	6	Andorra	Pol Moya	1:49.57		14
3	A	5	Ireland	Rocco Zaman-Browne	1:50.16		13
4	A	8	Austria	Elias Lachkovics	1:52.00		12
5	A	3	Malta	Christian Chetcuti	1:53.03		11
6	B	9	Armenia	Roman Aleksanyan	1:53.92	SB	10
7	B	9	Albania	Eraldo Qerama	1:54.19	SB	9
8	A	7	Israel	Noam Mamu	1:56.05		8
9	B	6	Georgia	Temur Mamedov	1:57.19	SB	7
10	A	9	Kosovo	Astrit Kryeziu	1:57.44		6
11	B	4	North Macedonia	Dimitar Petrovski	1:58.08	SB	5
12	B	3	San Marino	Probo Benvenuti	2:02.52	SB	4
13	B	8	Montenegro	Nemanja Đurišić	2:04.60	PB	3
14	B	7	Azerbaijan	Elman Abishov	2:06.12	PB	2
WR: (Kenya) David Rudisha - 1:40.91; ER: (Denmark) Wilson Kipketer - 1:41.11 EL: (France) Benjamin Robert - 1:43.48; CR: (Italy) Giordano Benedetti - 1:45.11

- DNE : AASSE

=== 1500 metres ===
Rank	Nation	Athlete	Result	Notes	Match points
1	Austria	Raphael Pallitsch	3:42.52		15
2	Ireland	Cathal Doyle	3:43.36		14
3	Armenia	Yervand Mkrtchyan	3:44.11		13
4	Israel	Tadesse Getahon	3:45.92	PB	12
5	Malta	Jordan Gusman	3:46.49	SB	11
6	Andorra	Carles Gómez Lozano	3:48.41	PB	10
7	North Macedonia	Leonid Vandevski	4:00.71		9
8	Bosnia and Herzegovina	Stefan Ćuković	4:07.24	SB	8
9	Georgia	Temur Mamedov	4:13.37	SB	7
10	San Marino	Lorenzo Bugli	4:13.55	SB	6
11	Azerbaijan	Elman Abishov	4:18.19	PB	5
12	Montenegro	Nemanja Đurišić	4:18.43	PB	4
-	Kosovo	Astrit Kryeziu	DNF		-
-	Albania	Bledar Mesi	DNS		-
WR: (Morocco) Hicham El Guerrouj - 3:26.00; ER: (Norway) Jakob Ingebrigtsen - 3:27.95 EL: (Norway) Jakob Ingebrigtsen - 3:27.95; CR: (Czech Republic) Jakub Holuša - 3:37.74

- DNE : AASSE

=== 5000 metres ===
Rank	Nation	Athlete	Result	Notes	Match points
1	Malta	Jordan Gusman	14:16.92		15
2	Austria	Andreas Vojta	14:17.02		14
3	Ireland	Fearghal Curtin	14:17.64	SB	13
4	Israel	Tadesse Getahon	14:19.86		12
5	Armenia	Yervand Mkrtchyan	14:23.92	SB	11
6	North Macedonia	Dario Ivanovski	14:27.66	SB	10
7	Bosnia and Herzegovina	Uroš Gutić	14:59.10	PB	9
8	Georgia	Daviti Kharazishvili	15:00.69	SB	8
9	Andorra	Francesc Carmona Parada	15:40.37	PB	7
10	San Marino	Lorenzo Bugli	16:01.08	PB	6
11	Montenegro	Željko Dabović	16:26.20	SB	5
12	Azerbaijan	Elman Abishov	16:26.70	SB	4
13	Albania	Ilir Këllezi	17:22.79	SB	3
-	Kosovo	Albion Ymeri	DNS		-
WR: (Uganda) Joshua Cheptegei - 12:35.36; ER: (Norway) Jakob Ingebrigtsen - 12:48.45 EL: (Spain) Mohamed Katir - 12:52.09; CR: (Italy) Yermane'e Crippa - 13:17.23

DNE : AASSE

=== 3000 metres steeplechase ===
Rank	Nation	Athlete	Result	Notes	Match points
1	Andorra	Nahuel Carabaña	8:48.79		15
2	Ireland	Finley Daly	8:51.14		14
3	Austria	Tobias Rattinger	8:53.59		13
4	Israel	Tomer Mualem	8:53.87		12
5	Malta	Luke Micallef	9:11.87	PB	11
6	North Macedonia	Leonid Vandevski	9:50.22	SB	10
7	Georgia	Giorgi Lomidze	9:54.95	PB	9
8	Bosnia and Herzegovina	Mlađen Samardžić	10:00.39	PB	8
9	Albania	Bledar Mesi	10:36.99	SB	7
10	Armenia	Sos Harutyunyan	10:55.42	SB	6
11	Montenegro	Miljan Kukulićić	10:55.53	SB	5
12	Kosovo	Genc Isufi	11:41.27	SB	4
13	San Marino	Tommaso Casadei	12:14.01	SB	3
WR: (Ethiopia) Lamecha Girma - 7:52.11; ER: (France) M M-Benabbad - 8:00.09 EL: (Spain) Daniel Arce - 8:10.63; CR: (Spain) Yoann Kowal - 8:25.50

- DNE : AASSE, Azerbaijan

=== 110 metres hurdles ===
Rank	Heat	Lane	Nation	Athlete	Result	Notes	Match points
1	A	5	Ireland	James Ezeonu	14.31		15
2	A	6	Montenegro	Darko Pešić	14.75		14
3	A	8	Austria	Jan Mitsche	15.12	SB	13
4	A	3	Bosnia and Herzegovina	Benjamin Bojanić	15.14	PB	12
5	A	7	Malta	Daniel Saliba	15.32		11
6	A	4	Israel	Dor Hayon	15.40		10
7	B	6	Albania	Milen Caco	15.48	PB	9
8	A	2	Andorra	Pol Herreros	15.70	PB	8
9	B	5	Georgia	Saba Soselia	17.02	PB	7
10	B	4	San Marino	Simone Gorini	19.23	PB	6
-	B	7	Armenia	Aram Aramyan	DQ	TR 22.6.2	-
Wind A: -0.6 m/s B: 0.0 m/s		WR: (United States) Aries Merritt – 12.80; ER: (United Kingdom) Colin Jackson - 12.91 EL: (France) Just Kwaou-Mathey - 13.09; CR: (Russia) Sergey Shubenkov - 13.20					

- DNE : AASSE, Azerbaijan, Kosovo, North Macedonia

=== 400 metres hurdles ===
Rank	Heat	Lane	Nation	Athlete	Result	Notes	Match points
1	A	5	Ireland	Thomas Barr	49.41		15
2	A	6	Austria	Leo Köhldorfer	50.70		14
3	A	7	San Marino	Andrea Ercolani Volta	52.19		13
4	A	8	Israel	Noah Yasky	53.95		12
5	A	9	Andorra	Eloi Vilella Escolano	55.63	SB	11
6	B	5	Azerbaijan	Javid Mammadov	55.76	PB	10
7	A	4	Bosnia and Herzegovina	Rusmir Malkočević	55.93	SB	9
8	A	2	Montenegro	Dragan Pešic	56.02	SB	8
9	B	9	North Macedonia	Ognen Stefanovski	56.30	SB	7
10	B	6	Albania	Durjon Idrizaj	56.33	PB	6
11	B	4	Georgia	Luka Kuphunia	57.08	SB	5
12	B	8	Malta	Steve Camilleri	57.43	SB	4
13	B	7	Armenia	Aram Aramyan	57.84	PB	3
14	B	2	Kosovo	Florian Berisha	1:00.88	SB	2
WR: (Norway) Karsten Warholm - 45.94; ER: (Norway) Karsten Warholm - 45.94 EL: (Norway) Karsten Warholm - 46.42; CR: (Norway) Karsten Warholm - 48.46

- DNE : AASSE

=== High jump ===
Rank	Nation	Athlete	Result	Notes	Match points
1	Ireland	David Cussen	2.11	SB	15
2	Austria	Lionel Afan Strasser	2.11		14
3	Bosnia and Herzegovina	Samir Hodžić	1.90	SB	12.50
3	Israel	Ariel Atias	1.90	SB	12.50
5	Montenegro	Dragan Pešić	1.85		11
6	Albania	Milen Caco	1.75	SB	10
7	Georgia	Saba Soselia	1.70	SB	9
8	North Macedonia	Ognen Stefanovski	1.70	SB	8
9	Malta	Ryan John Zammit	1.70	SB	7
10	Andorra	Nil Graells	1.70		6
-	San Marino	Eugenio Rossi	NM		-
WR: (Cuba) Javier Sotomayor - 2.45; ER: (Sweden) Patrik Sjöberg - 2.42 EL: (Poland) Norbert Kobielski - 2.27; CR: (Ukraine) Dmytro Dem'yanyuk - 2.35

- DNE : AASSE, Armenia, Azerbaijan, Kosovo

=== Pole vault ===
Rank	Nation	Athlete	Result	Notes	Match points
1	Austria	Alexander Auer	5.10	SB	15
2	Israel	Lev Skorish	4.90		14
3	Andorra	Miquel Vilchez Vendrell	4.75		13
4	Ireland	Michael Bowler	4.30		12
5	Malta	Nicolai Bonello	4.00		10.5
5	Bosnia and Herzegovina	Luka Ivičić	4.00		10.5
7	Georgia	Lasha Karkusashvili	3.70	SB	9
-	Montenegro	Miloš Popović	NM		-
-	North Macedonia	Brajan Avia	DNS		-
WR: (Sweden) Armand Duplantis - 6.23; ER: (Sweden) Armand Duplantis - 6.23 EL: (Sweden) Armand Duplantis - 6.23; CR: (France) Renaud Lavillenie - 6.01

DNE : AASSE, Azerbaijan, Armenia, San Marino, Albania, Kosovo

=== Long jump ===
Rank	Nation	Athlete	Result	Notes	Match Points
1	North Macedonia	Andreas Trajkovski	7.73		15
2	Israel	Ishay Ifraimov	7.70	SB	14
3	Albania	Muhamet Cangeli	7.36	SB	13
4	Georgia	Bachana Khorava	7.35		12
5	Austria	Samuel Szihn	7.35		11
6	Bosnia and Herzegovina	Stefan Stanković	7.19	PB	10
7	Malta	Jeremy Zammit	7.18		9
8	Azerbaijan	Kasgin Abbaszade	7.12		8
9	Armenia	Gor Beglaryan	6.91	SB	7
10	Liechtenstein	Matthias Verling	6.37	SB	6
11	Montenegro	Matija Vojvodić	6.14		5
12	Andorra	Miquel Vilchez Vendrell	5.63		4
13	San Marino	Davide Davosi	5.57	SB	3
-	Ireland	Reece Ademola	NM		-
-	Kosovo	Erudit Rysha	DNS		-
WR: (United States) Mike Powell - 8.95; ER: (Soviet Union) Robert Emmiyan - 8.86 EL: (Switzerland) Simon Ehammer - 8.32; CR: (Greece) Miltiadis Tentoglou - 8.38

=== Triple jump ===
Rank	Nation	Athlete	Results	Notes	Match points
1	Armenia	Levon Aghasyan	16.36	SB	15
2	Azerbaijan	Alexis Copello	15.91		14
3	Georgia	Lasha Gulelauri	15.91	SB	13
4	Austria	Endiorass Kingley	15.38		12
5	Albania	Muhamet Cangeli	15.15	SB	11
6	Israel	Guy Margalit	14.87		10
7	Ireland	Jai Benson	14.84	SB	9
8	Bosnia and Herzegovina	Sedin Heco	14.29	SB	8
9	Malta	Armani James	13.78		7
10	Kosovo	Erudit Rysha	13.06	SB	6
11	North Macedonia	Brajan Avia	12.98	SB	5
12	San Marino	Davide Davosi	12.72	SB	4
13	Montenegro	Matija Vojvodić	12.67	SB	3
14	Andorra	Pol Herreros	12.29	SB	2
WR: (United Kingdom) Jonathan Edwards - 18.29; ER: (United Kingdom) Jonathan Edwards - 18.29 EL: (Italy) Andy Diaz Hernandez - 17.75; CR: (Portugal) Nelson Évora - 17.59

DNE : AASSE

=== Shot put ===
Rank	Nation	Athlete	Result	Notes	Match Points
1	Ireland	Eric Favors	20.28		15
2	Bosnia and Herzegovina	Mesud Pezer	20.25		14
3	Kosovo	Muhamet Ramadani	19.07		13
4	Georgia	Giorgi Mujaridze	18.94		12
5	Montenegro	Tomaš Đurović	18.21		11
6	Israel	Menachem Mendel Chen	15.87		10
7	Azerbaijan	Ismail Aliyev	15.84		9
8	Albania	Azgan Zeka	14.72		8
9	Austria	Will Dibo	14.30		7
10	Armenia	Manuk Manukyan	13.77	SB	6
11	North Macedonia	Marjan Nojkovski	13.31	SB	5
12	Malta	Armani James	10.71	SB	4
13	Andorra	Oriol Cerdà Cassi	10.17	SB	3
14	San Marino	Matteo Forcellini	8.94	SB	2
WR: (United States) Ryan Crouser - 23.56; ER: (East Germany) Ulf Timmermann - 23.06 EL: (Italy) Zane Weir - 21.74; CR: (Poland) Michał Haratyk - 21.83

- DNE : AASSE

=== Discus throw ===
Rank	Nation	Athlete	Result	Notes	Match points
1	Austria	Lukas Weißhaidinger	62.12		15
2	Montenegro	Danijel Furtula	57.60		14
3	Georgia	Temuri Abulashvili	54.98	SB	13
4	Bosnia and Herzegovina	Voislav Grubiša	53.64		12
5	Ireland	Colin Quirke	52.41		11
6	Israel	Denis Valiulin	52.14		10
7	Malta	Luke Farrugia	48.04		9
8	Armenia	Manuk Manukyan	45.35	SB	8
9	North Macedonia	Stefan Stefanoski	45.20	SB	7
10	Azerbaijan	Ismail Aliyev	44.83		6
11	Kosovo	Alaudin Suma	44.68	SB	5
12	Albania	Admir Dizdari	38.79	SB	4
13	Andorra	Lander Teixeira Sanchez	24.36	SB	3
12	San Marino	Simone Gorini	20.99	SB	2
WR: (East Germany) Jürgen Schult - 74.08; ER: (East Germany) Jürgen Schult - 74.08 EL: (Slovenia) Kristjan Čeh - 71.86; CR: (Estonia) Gerd Kanter - 68.76

DNE : AASSE

=== Hammer throw ===
Rank	Nation	Athlete	Result	Notes	Match points
1	Ireland	Sean Mockler	63.83		15
2	Georgia	Goga Tchikhvaria	62.81	SB	14
3	Albania	Dorian Çollaku	57.89	SB	13
4	Austria	Kilian Moser	56.42		12
5	Israel	Yahav Adir	54.74	SB	11
6	Malta	Luca Martini	53.28	SB	10
7	Bosnia and Herzegovina	Samir Vilić	50.62	SB	9
8	Montenegro	Danijel Furtula	41.45	SB	8
9	North Macedonia	Marjan Nojkovski	29.56	PB	7
10	Andorra	Oriol Cerdà Cassi	26.51	SB	6
11	Armenia	Vanik Arakelyan	18.63	SB	5
WR: (Soviet Union) Yuriy Sedykh - 86.74; ER: (Soviet Union) Yuriy Sedykh - 86.74 EL: (Poland) Wojciech Nowicki - 81.92; CR: (Poland) Paweł Fajdek - 82.98

DNE : AASSE, Azerbaijan, Kosovo, San Marino

=== Javelin throw ===
Rank	Nation	Athlete	Result	Notes	Match points
1	Bosnia and Herzegovina	Dejan Mileusnić	71.81		15
2	Austria	Matthias Lasch	65.24	SB	14
3	Ireland	Conor Cusack	63.95		13
4	Georgia	Irakli Zhorzholiani	61.25	SB	12
5	Liechtenstein	Matthias Verling	59.40		11
6	Israel	Ariel Atias	57.99		10
7	Montenegro	Amir Papazi	56.56		9
8	Kosovo	Bardhyl Hajdaraj	49.77	SB	8
9	Albania	Ingri Nelaj	48.56	SB	7
10	San Marino	Matteo Forcellini	42.81	SB	6
11	Armenia	Vanik Arakelyan	38.76	SB	5
12	North Macedonia	Stefan Stefanoski	34.04	SB	4
13	Andorra	Lander Teixeira Sanchez	33.47	PB	3
14	Malta	Armani James	30.54	SB	2
WR: (Czech Republic) Jan Železný - 98.48; ER: (Czech Republic) Jan Železný - 98.48 EL: (Czech Republic) Jakub Vadlejch - 89.51; CR: (Germany) Johannes Vetter - 96.29

- DNE : Azerbaijan

=== 4 x 100 metres relay ===
Rank	Heat	Lane	Nation	Members	Result	Notes	Match points
1	A	8	Ireland	Israel Olatunde; Mark Smyth; Christopher Sibanda; Joseph Ojewumi	39.57	SB	15
2	A	6	Israel	Eden Sela; Thomas Dubnov-Raz; Aviv Koffler; Blessing Akwasi Afrifah	39.66	SB	14
3	A	4	Malta	Beppe Grillo; Graham Pellegrini; Luke Bezzinga; Omar el Aida Chaffey	41.11	SB	13
4	A	9	Bosnia and Herzegovina	Edhem Vikalo; Borislav Dragoljević; Abedin Mujezinović; Egon Savić	41.64	SB	12
5	A	3	North Macedonia	Andreas Trajkovski; Ognen Stefanovski; Mihail Petrov; Jovan Stojoski	41.75	NR	11
6	A	5	Georgia	Luka Kuphunia; Mindia Endeladze; Bachana Khorava; Saba Soselia	42.19	SB	10
7	B	8	Azerbaijan	Aleksey Aliakbarov; Ali Abdiyev; Gadir Gurbanov; Kasgin Abbaszade	42.63	SB	9
8	A	2	Andorra	Lander Teixeira Sanchez; Guillem Arderiu Vilanova; Pau Blasi; Miquel Vilchez Vendrell	42.84	SB	8
9	B	6	San Marino	Davide Davosi; Probo Benvenuti; Santos Nicolas Bollini; Matias Francini	42.92	SB	7
10	B	4	Kosovo	Leon Thaqi; Olti Bytyqi; Granit Ahmeti; Enis Bytyqi	43.46	SB	6
11	B	5	Montenegro	Dragan Pešić; Ognjen Marsenić; Darko Pešić; Matija Vojdović	43.88	SB	5
12	B	9	Armenia	Aram Aramyan; Gor Harutyunyan; Roman Aleksanyan; Davit Sargsyan	45.53	SB	4
-	A	7	Austria	Andreas Meyer-Lux; Lukas Pullnig; Stephan Pacher; Noel Waroschitz	DQ	TR 24.7	-
-	B	7	Albania	-	DNS		-
WR: Jamaica - 36.94; ER: (United Kingdom) Great Britain and N.I. - 37.36 EL: France - 38.22; CR: (United Kingdom) Great Britain and N.I. - 38.08

- DNE : AASSE

== Women's events ==
=== 100 metres ===
Rank	Heat	Lane	Nation	Athlete	Result	Notes	Match points
1	A	4	Austria	Magdalena Lindner	11.57		15
2	A	5	San Marino	Alessandra Gasparelli	11.65	NU23R	14
3	A	6	Ireland	Lauren Roy	11.82		13
4	A	3	Israel	Ilana Dorfman	12.01		12
5	B	4	Kosovo	Sara Susuri	12.03	NR	11
6	A	7	Malta	Charlotte Wingfield	12.15		10
7	A	2	Bosnia and Herzegovina	Neira Bosnić	12.23		9
8	B	5	Albania	Elisa Myrtollari	12.34	SB	8
9	B	7	Andorra	Alba Viñals	12.37	NU18B	7
10	B	6	Azerbaijan	Ilaha Guliyeva	12.39	PB	6
11	A	8	Armenia	Marianna Baghyan	12.41	SB	5
12	B	7	Georgia	Lika Kharchilava	12.55	SB	4
13	B	8	North Macedonia	Natura Malo	12.67	SB	3
14	B	2	Montenegro	Andjela Drobnjak	12.81	PB	2
Wind A: -0.8 m/s B: +1.0 m/s		WR: (United States) F Griffith-Joyner - 10.49; ER: (France) Christine Arron - 10.73 EL: (United Kingdom) Daryll Neita - 10.97; CR: (Bulgaria) Ivet Lalova-Collio - 11.11					

- DNE : AASSE

=== 200 metres ===
Rank	Heat	Lane	Nation	Athlete	Result	Notes	Match points
1	A	8	Austria	Susanne Gogl-Walli	23.09	PB	15
2	A	6	Ireland	Phil Healy	23.79		14
3	A	4	San Marino	Alessandra Gasparelli	24.30	NR	13
4	A	3	Armenia	Gayane Chiloyan	24.36	SB	12
5	A	5	Israel	Ilana Dorfman	24.43 (.424)	PB	11
6	A	7	Malta	Charlotte Wingfield	24.43 (.430)		10
7	B	6	Bosnia and Herzegovina	Neira Bosnić	24.87	PB	9
8	A	9	Georgia	Ani Mamatsashvili	24.89	PB	8
9	B	7	Kosovo	Sara Susuri	25.00	PB	7
10	A	2	Azerbaijan	Ilaha Guliyeva	25.33	PB	6
11	B	4	Albania	Iljana Beqiri	25.70	PB	5
12	B	9	North Macedonia	Ana Bozinovska	26.03	PB	4
13	B	5	Montenegro	Maša Bubanja	26.68 (.671)	PB	3
14	B	8	Andorra	Bruna Luque	26.68 (.676)	PB	2
Wind A: +0.2 m/s B: +0.8 m/s		WR: (United States) F Griffith Joyner - 21.34; ER: (Netherlands) Dafne Schippers - 21.63 EL: (United Kingdom) Daryll Neita - 22.23; CR: (Netherlands) Dafne Schippers - 22.45					

DNE : AASSE

=== 400 metres ===
Rank	Heat	Lane	Nation	Athlete	Result	Notes	Match points
1	A	5	Ireland	Sharlene Mawdsley	51.55		15
2	A	6	Malta	Janet Richard	52.37	NR	14
3	A	8	Austria	Anna Mager	54.26	PB	13
4	A	2	Israel	Nitzan Asas	55.21	PB	12
5	A	7	Azerbaijan	Lamiya Valiyeva	55.79		11
6	A	9	Armenia	Gayane Chiloyan	57.47	SB	10
7	B	7	Albania	Iljana Beqiri	57.60	SB	9
8	A	3	Bosnia and Herzegovina	Jelena Gajić	57.94	SB	8
9	B	5	Andorra	Carlota Meritxell Málaga Morán	58.52	PB	7
10	A	4	North Macedonia	Ana Bozinovska	58.70	SB	6
11	B	9	Montenegro	Anabela Mujovi	58.86	PB	5
12	B	6	Georgia	Ana Sokhadze	58.94	PB	4
13	B	3	Kosovo	Emine Jenuzi	59.31	SB	3
14	B	8	Liechtenstein	Nadine Stüber	1:00.29		2
15	B	4	San Marino	Sofia Bucci	1:00.69	SB	1
WR: (East Germany) Marita Koch - 47.60; ER: (East Germany) Marita Koch - 47.60 EL: (Republic of Ireland) Rhasidat Adeleke - 49.20; CR: (Netherlands) Femke Bol - 50.37

=== 800 metres ===
Rank	Heat	Lane	Nation	Athlete	Result	Notes	Match points
1	A	4	Ireland	Louise Shanahan	2:03.39		15
2	A	7	Malta	Gina Mcnamara	2:02.41	PB	14
3	A	5	Austria	Caroline Bredlinger	2:04.78	PB	13
4	A	6	Israel	Sivan Auerbach	2:07.12	SB	12
5	A	8	Kosovo	Gresa Bakraçi	2:07.67	NR	11
6	A	9	Bosnia and Herzegovina	Jelena Gajić	2:11.07	SB	10
7	A	2	Armenia	Ellada Alaverdyan	2:11.17	SB	9
8	B	4	Albania	Relaksa Dauti	2:15.21	SB	8
9	B	5	Andorra	Maria Cristina Martins Patricio	2:17.14	PB	7
10	B	7	Azerbaijan	Anna Yusupova	2:17.33	PB	6
11	B	6	Georgia	Gaiane Ustian	2:23.17	SB	5
12	B	3	North Macedonia	Irma Hajdari	2:24.36	SB	4
13	A	3	Montenegro	Slađana Pejović	2:26.14	SB	3
14	B	8	San Marino	Anita Bernardini	2:52.35	SB	2
WR: (Czechoslovakia) Jarmila Kratochvílová - 1:53.28; ER: (Czechoslovakia) Jarmila Kratochvílová - 1:53.28 EL: (United Kingdom) Keely Hodgkinson - 1:55.77; CR: (Ukraine) Yuliya Krevsun - 1:58.62

DNE : AASSE

=== 1500 metres ===
Rank	Nation	Athlete	Result	Notes	Match points
1	Ireland	Sophie O'Sullivan	4:27.96		15
2	Malta	Gina Mcnamara	4:28.28		14
3	Israel	Sivan Auerbach	4:29.11		13
4	Austria	Sandra Schauer	4:31.96		12
5	Albania	Redia Dauti	4:35.72	SB	11
6	Azerbaijan	Anna Yusupova	4:38.00	PB	10
7	Bosnia and Herzegovina	Glorija Kureš	4:42.55	SB	9
8	Andorra	Aina Cinca Bons	4:43.58	SB	8
9	North Macedonia	Adrijana Pop Arsova	4:48.95	PB	7
10	Montenegro	Slađana Pejović	4:50.62	SB	6
11	Armenia	Mari Sargsyan	4:54.92	SB	5
12	Kosovo	Valentina Kelmendi - Musa	5:02.60	SB	4
13	Georgia	Gaiane Ustian	5:03.51	SB	3
14	Liechtenstein	Sienna Zobel	5:04.54		2
15	San Marino	Anita Bernardini	6:14.60	SB	1
WR: (Kenya) Faith Kipyegon - 3:49.118; ER: (Netherlands) Sifan Hassan - 3:51.95 EL: (United Kingdom) Laura Muir - 3:57.09; CR: (Ukraine) Anna Mishchenko - 4:05.32

=== 5000 metres ===
Rank	Nation	Athlete	Result	Notes	Match points
1	Albania	Luiza Gega	15:32.39	SB	15
2	Israel	Lonah Chemtai Salpeter	15:36.07	SB	14
3	Ireland	Aoibhe Richardson	16:45.02		13
4	Austria	Sandra Schauer	17:28.65	SB	12
5	Azerbaijan	Anna Yusupova	17:37.97	SB	11
6	Malta	Lisa Bezzina	17:38.84		10
7	North Macedonia	Adrijana Pop Arsova	18:05.02	SB	9
8	Andorra	Xènia Mourelo	18:29.67	SB	8
9	Bosnia and Herzegovina	Alma Hrnjić	18:30.94	SB	7
10	Montenegro	Slađana Pejović	18:57.81	SB	6
11	Armenia	Mari Sargsyan	19:14.92	SB	5
12	Kosovo	Shala Ejona	20:03.19	SB	4
13	San Marino	Chiara Guiducci	21:01.00	SB	3
14	Georgia	Asia Charukhchian	22:03.81	SB	2
WR: (Kenya) Faith Kipyegon - 14:05.20; ER: (Netherlands) Sifan Hassan - 14:22.12 EL: (United Kingdom) Laura Muir - 14:48.14; CR: (Turkey) Elvan Abeylegesse - 15:09.31

DNE : AASSE

=== 3000 metres steeplechase ===
Rank	Nation	Athlete	Result	Notes	Match points
1	Albania	Luiza Gega	9:17.31	(gold) ^{1}CR	15
2	Israel	Adva Cohen	9:47.52		14
3	Ireland	Ava O'Connor	10:18.10		13
4	Austria	Katharina Pesendorfer	10:33.55		12
5	Kosovo	Gresa Bakraçi	10:42.39	NR	11
6	Armenia	Ellada Alaverdyan	11:02.54	NR	10
7	Andorra	Xènia Mourelo	11:19.40	SB	9
8	Malta	Rosalie Cauchi	11:36.84	PB	8
9	Bosnia and Herzegovina	Elma Hasanbašić	13:05.80	SB	7
10	Georgia	Asia Charukhchian	13:37.51	SB	6
11	Montenegro	Vesna Pavlicević	14:12.17	SB	5
12	San Marino	Anna Viserbi	15:10.98	NR	4
-	North Macedonia	Irma Hajdari	DNF		-
WR: (Kenya) Beatrice Chepkoech - 8:44.32; ER: (Russia) G Samitova-Galkina - 8:58.81 EL: (France) Alice Finot - 9:10.04; CR: (Russia) Yuliya Zaripova - 9:23.00

1. Gold medal awarded for overall result across all three divisions.

DNE : AASSE, Azerbaijan

=== 100 metres hurdles ===
Rank	Heat	Lane	Nation	Athlete	Result	Notes	Match points
1	A	4	Ireland	Sarah Lavin	12.82	(bronze) ^{1} SB	15
2	A	5	Austria	Karin Strametz	13.25	PB	14
3	A	6	Israel	Linoy Levy	13.88	SB	13
4	A	7	Bosnia and Herzegovina	Maša Garić	14.28	PB	12
5	A	3	Andorra	Alba Viñals	14.68	NR	11
6	A	8	Albania	Melisa Sina	15.09	SB	10
7	A	2	Montenegro	Maša Bubanja	15.50	PB	9
8	A	9	Armenia	Meline Adamyan	15.52	PB	8
9	B	6	North Macedonia	Sara Osmanovska	16.92	SB	7
10	B	5	San Marino	Letizia Casadei Valentini	16.93	PB	6
11	B	4	Malta	Clare Mcnamara	18.41	SB	5
12	B	3	Georgia	Ana Sokhadze	19.08	SB	4
13	B	7	Kosovo	Donika Kryemadhi	20.66	SB	3
Wind A: +0.8 m/s B: -0.2 m/s		WR: (Nigeria) Tobi Amusan - 12.12; ER: (Bulgaria) Yordanka Donkova - 12.21 EL: (Czech Republic) Reetta Hurske - 12.70; CR: (Belarus) Elvira Herman - 12.62					

DNE : AASSE, Azerbaijan

1: Medal is overall European Games medal across.all three divisions

=== 400 metres hurdles ===
Rank	Heat	Lane	Nation	Athlete	Result	Notes	Match points
1	A	5	Austria	Lena Pressler	57.02		15
2	A	6	Ireland	Kelly Mcgrory	58.08		14
3	A	7	Israel	Noah Levy	58.72	PB	13
4	A	9	Bosnia and Herzegovina	Maša Garić	1:00.01	PB	12
5	A	8	Andorra	Duna Viñals	1:00.22	NR	11
6	A	2	Armenia	Allison Halverson	1:02.38		10
7	A	3	Albania	Uibi Ahmet	1:05.28	SB	9
8	B	7	Montenegro	Mia Milašinović	1:05.60	SB	8
9	B	6	Georgia	Ana Sokhadze	1:06.84	SB	7
10	B	5	San Marino	Chiara Casadei	1:13.58		6
11	B	4	Malta	Rosalie Cauchi	1:13.72	SB	5
12	B	8	Kosovo	Florentina Restelica	1:15.10	SB	4
-	A	4	North Macedonia	Drita Islami	DNF		-
WR: (United States) Sydney McLaughlin - 50.68; ER: (Netherlands) Femke Bol - 52.03 EL: (Netherlands) Femke Bol - 52.30; CR: (Bulgaria) Vania Stambolova - 53.70

DNE : AASSE, Azerbaijan

=== High jump ===
Rank	Nation	Athlete	Result	Notes	Match points
1	Montenegro	Marija Vuković	1.87		15
2	Bosnia and Herzegovina	Sara Lučić	1.78	SB	14
3	Ireland	Sommer Lecky	1.74		13
4	Israel	Danielle Frenkel	1.70		11.50
4	Austria	Sarah Lagger	1.70		11.50
6	North Macedonia	Mihaela Lazarovska	1.60	SB	10
7	Georgia	Bela Tchkadua	1.60	PB	9
8	San Marino	Lucia Casali	1.55	SB	8
9	Andorra	Aroa Carballo	1.55	PB	7
10	Albania	Rexhina Berami	1.50		6
11	Malta	Kay Testa	1.45	SB	5
-	Kosovo	Donika Kryemadhi	NM		-
WR: (Bulgaria) Stefka Kostadinova - 2.09; ER: (Bulgaria) Stefka Kostadinova - 2.09 EL: (Ukraine) Yaroslava Mahuchikh - 2.01; CR: (Croatia) Blanka Vlašić - 2.04

DNE : AASSE, Armenia, Azerbaijan

=== Pole vault ===
Rank	Nation	Athlete	Result	Notes	Entry PB
1	Ireland	Ellie Mccartney	4.20		15
2	Austria	Shanna Tureczek	3.60		14
3	Israel	Yarden Mantel	3.60		13
4	Malta	Sana Grillo	3.60	=PB	12
5	San Marino	Martina Muraccini	3.35		11
6	Bosnia and Herzegovina	Neira Hadžiahmetagić	2.80	=NR	10
7	Andorra	Ariadna Argemí Agustí	2.50	2.50	9
8	North Macedonia	Mihaela Lazarovska	2.20	2.20	8
WR: (Russia) Yelena Isinbayeva - 5.06; ER: (Russia) Yelena Isinbayeva - 5.06 EL: (Slovenia) Tina Šutej - 4.76; CR: (Poland) Anna Rogowska - 4.75

DNE : AASSE, Albania, Armenia, Azerbaijan, Georgia, Kosovo, Montenegro

=== Long jump ===
Rank	Nation	Athlete	Result	Notes	Match points
1	Ireland	Ruby Millet	6.33		15
2	Israel	Romi Tamir	6.07	PB	14
3	Armenia	Yana Sargsyan	5.99	SB	13
4	Austria	Ingeborg Grünwald	5.92		12
5	Malta	Claire Azzopardi	5.77		11
6	Montenegro	Ljiljana Matović	5.47	SB	10
7	Bosnia and Herzegovina	Emina Omanović	5.46		9
8	San Marino	Emma Corbelli	5.32	SB	8
9	Azerbaijan	Fakhriyya Taghizade	5.14		7
10	North Macedonia	Kamelija Kajcevski	4.97		6
11	Albania	Figalia Gjati	4.95	SB	5
12	Andorra	Jana Rodriguez	4.83	SB	4
13	Georgia	Natalia Grigoryan	4.69	SB	3
-	Kosovo	Lirije Peci	NM		-
WR: (Soviet Union) Galina Chistyakova - 7.52; ER: (Soviet Union) Galina Chistyakova - 7.52 EL: (United Kingdom) Jazmin Sawyers - 7.00i CR: (Russia) Darya Klishina - 6.95

DNE : AASSE

=== Triple jump ===
Rank	Nation	Athlete	Result	Notes	Match points
1	Azerbaijan	Yekaterina Sariyeva	13.38		15
2	Armenia	Yana Sargsyan	13.06	SB	14
3	Ireland	Saragh Buggy	13.01		13
4	Israel	Romi Tamir	12.67		12
5	Malta	Rebecca Saré	12.42		11
6	Austria	Jana Schnabel	12.42	SB	10
7	Montenegro	Ljiljana Matović	12.13		9
8	Bosnia and Herzegovina	Ana Dorotea Markić	11.88	SB	8
9	Georgia	Natalia Grigoryan	11.01	SB	7
10	Albania	Joana Goli	10.95	SB	6
11	San Marino	Alessia Selva	10.47		5
12	North Macedonia	Sara Osmanovska	10.18	SB	4
13	Andorra	Jana Rodriguez	10.05	SB	3
14	Kosovo	Lirije Peci	9.59	SB	2
WR: (Venezuela) Yulimar Rojas - 15.74; ER: (Ukraine) Inessa Kravets - 15.50 EL: (Ukraine) Maryna Bekh-Romanchuk - 14.75; CR: (Russia) Yekaterina Koneva - 14.87

DNE : AASSE

=== Shot put ===
Rank	Nation	Athlete	Result	Notes	Match Points
1	Georgia	Sopiko Shatirishvili	15.86	=SB	15
2	Ireland	Michaela Walsh	15.26		14
3	Israel	Estel Valeanu	15.21		13
4	Montenegro	Vesna Klajević	14.24		12
5	Austria	Sarah Lagger	13.43		11
6	Bosnia and Herzegovina	Gorana Tešanović	13.05	SB	10
7	Armenia	Allison Halverson	11.79	SB	9
8	Malta	Mireya Cassar	11.44	SB	8
9	Kosovo	Arbesa Shala	9.57	SB	7
10	North Macedonia	Mateja Efremovska	9.31	SB	6
11	San Marino	Giorgia Cesarini	7.65	PB	5
12	Andorra	Maria Morató Cañabate	7.22	PB	4
WR: (Soviet Union) Natalya Lisovskaya - 22.63; ER: (Soviet Union) Natalya Lisovskaya - 22.63 EL: (Portugal) Auriol Dongmo - 19.72; CR: (Germany) Christina Schwanitz - 19.82

DNE : AASSE, Albania, Armenia, Azerbaijan

=== Discus throw ===
Rank	Nation	Athlete	Result	Notes	Matchpoints
1	Israel	Estel Valeanu	57.17		15
2	Austria	Djeneba Touré	53.12	SB	14
3	Montenegro	Kristina Rakočević	51.87		13
4	Ireland	Niamh Fogarty	51.24	SB	12
5	Liechtenstein	Jule Insinna	45.68		11
6	Bosnia and Herzegovina	Dženisa Gusinac	36.63		10
7	Malta	Antonella Chouhal	31.70	SB	9
8	Georgia	Nino Tsikvadze	30.75	SB	8
9	North Macedonia	Tea Aleksovska	29.71	SB	7
10	Kosovo	Medina Kutleshi	26.39	SB	6
11	Armenia	Zhanna Shahnazaryan	26.31	SB	5
12	Andorra	Dolça Fajardo Casanova	23.84	PB	4
13	San Marino	Letizia Casadei Valentini	14.94	SB	3
WR: (East Germany) Gabriele Reinsch - 76.80; ER: (East Germany) Gabriele Reinsch - 76.80 EL: (Netherlands) Jorinde van Klinken - 67.05; CR: (Croatia) Sandra Perković - 68.58

DNE : Albania, Azerbaijan

=== Hammer throw ===
Rank	Nation	Athlete	Result	Notes	Match points
1	Azerbaijan	Hanna Skydan	71.69	SB	15
2	Ireland	Nicola Tuthill	67.85	PB	14
3	Austria	Bettina Weber	59.09		13
4	Israel	Evgenia Zabolotni	54.94		12
5	Georgia	Nino Tsikvadze	53.52	SB	11
6	Bosnia and Herzegovina	Ajla Bašić	53.14		10
7	Malta	Mireya Cassar	50.26		9
8	Armenia	Zhanna Shahnazaryan	48.58	SB	8
9	Montenegro	Ana Bošković	43.67	SB	7
10	North Macedonia	Tea Aleksovska	31.20	SB	6
11	Andorra	Dolça Fajardo Casanova	23.70	SB	5
WR: (Poland) Anita Włodarczyk - 82.98; ER: (Poland) Anita Włodarczyk - 82.98 EL: (Finland) Silja Kosonen - 73.78; CR: (Poland) Anita Włodarczyk - 78.28

DNE : AASSE, Albania, Kosovo, San Marino

=== Javelin throw ===
Rank	Nation	Athlete	Result	Notes	Match points
1	Austria	Victoria Hudson	60.27	3rd place, bronze medalist(s)	15
2	Israel	Margaryta Dorozhon	47.23		14
3	Montenegro	Marija Bogavac	45.15		13
4	Bosnia and Herzegovina	Aleksandra Vidović	43.18	SB	12
5	Ireland	Grace Casey	42.04		11
6	Malta	Clare Mcnamara	36.67	SB	10
7	Armenia	Allison Halverson	36.27	SB	9
8	San Marino	Giorgia Cesarini	29.64	SB	8
9	Andorra	Maria Morató Cañabate	29.60	NR	7
10	North Macedonia	Mateja Efremovska	26.29	PB	6
11	Kosovo	Medina Kutleshi	22.93	SB	5
12	Georgia	Bela Tchkadua	21.99	PB	4
WR: (Czech Republic) Barbora Špotáková - 72.28; ER: (Czech Republic) Barbora Špotáková - 72.28 EL: (Norway) Sigrid Borge - 66.50; CR: (Germany) Christin Hussong - 69.19

DNE : AASSE, Albania, Azerbaijan

=== 4 x 100 metres relay ===
Rank	Heat	Lane	Nation	Members	Result	Notes	Match points
1	A	5	Austria	Karin Strametz; Susanne Gogl-Walli; Isabel Posch; Magdalena Lindner	44.18	NR	15
2	A	6	Ireland	Sarah Leahy; Mollie O'Reilly; Joan Healy; Adeyemi Talabi	44.80	SB	14
3	A	8	Israel	Nitzan Asas; Ilana Dorfman; Alina Drutman; Hileni Mor	45.68	SB	13
4	A	7	Malta	Claire Azzopardi; Janet Richard; Alessia Cristina; Charlotte Wingfield	45.87	SB	12
5	B	8	Albania	Paola Shyle; Alesia Dauti; Joana Bitri; Elisa Myrtollari	48.22	SB	11
6	A	2	Andorra	Jana Rodriguez; Alba Viñals; Duna Viñals; Carlota Meritxell Málaga Morán	48.61	NR	10
7	A	4	Armenia	Marianna Baghyan; Inga Shekoyan; Meline Adamyan; Gayane Chiloyan	48.95	SB	9
8	B	4	Montenegro	Andjela Drobnjak; Mia Milašinović; Maša Dubanja; Anabela Mujovi	50.36	SB	8
9	A	9	Georgia	Ani Mamatsashvili; Natalia Grigoryan; Bela Tchkadua; Lika Kharchilava	50.88	SB	7
10	B	6	Kosovo	Vesa Jusufi; Medina Kutleshi; Florentina Restelica; Emine Jenuzi	51.31	SB	6
11	B	5	North Macedonia	Natura Malo; Ana Bozinovska; Sara Osmanovska; Kamelija Kajcevski	52.01	SB	5
-	A	3	Bosnia and Herzegovina	Ajla Reizbegovic; Emina Omanović; Una Ban; Neira Bosnić	DQ	TR 17.3.1	-
-	B	7	San Marino	Martina Muraccini; Sofia Bucci; Emma Corbelli; Alessandra Gasparelli	DQ	TR 17.3.1	-
WR: United States - 40.82; ER: East Germany - 41.37 EL: Spain - 42.99; CR: Germany - 42.47

DNE : AASSE, Azerbaijan

== Mixed event ==
=== 4 x 400 metres relay ===
Rank	Heat	Lane	Nation	Members	Result	Notes	Match points
1	A	8	Ireland	Nelvin Appiah; Róisín Harrison; Callum Baird; Sharlene Mawdsley	3:17.16	EL	15
2	A	6	Austria	Alessandro Greco; Lena Pressler; Leo Köhldorfer; Susanne Gogl-Walli	3:22.46	SB	14
3	A	5	Israel	Eran Siboni; Shani Zakay; Noam Mamu; Nitzan Asas	3:27.57	SB	13
4	A	4	Andorra	Pau Blasi; Alba Viñals; Pol Moya; Duna Viñals	3:29.54	NR	12
5	B	8	Armenia	Davit Sargsyan; Gayane Chiloyan; Gor Harutyunyan; Allison Halverson	3:29.99	SB	11
6	A	9	Bosnia and Herzegovina	Jovan Rosić; Jelena Gajić; Abedin Mujezinović; Kristina Stojković	3:30.74	SB	10
7	B	7	Azerbaijan	Javid Mammadov; Lamiya Valiyeva; Ali Abdiyev; Ilaha Guliyeva	3:31.55	SB	9
8	A	7	Malta	Steve Camilleri; Kay Testa; Graham Pellegrini; Janet Richard	3:33.91	SB	8
9	A	3	Georgia	Luka Kuphunia; Ani Mamatsashvili; Mindia Endeladze; Ana Sokhadze	3:36.62	SB	7
10	A	2	Albania	Stivi Kereku; Livja Topi; Erkian Manci; Zhuljeta Çejku	3:36.79	SB	6
11	B	4	Kosovo	Leon Thaqi; Emine Jenuzi; Granit Ahmeti; Gresa Bakraçi	3:37.59	SB	5
12	B	5	North Macedonia	Mihail Petrov; Ana Bozinovska; Jovan Stojoski; Sara Osmanovska	3:40.64	SB	4
13	B	9	Montenegro	Dragan Pešić; Mia Milašinović; Nemanja Džaković; Anabela Mujovi	3:42.91	SB	3
14	B	6	San Marino	Andrea Ercolani Volta; Sofia Bucci; Alessandro Gasperoni; Chiara Casadei	3:43.50	SB	2
WR: United States - 3:09.34; ER: Poland - 3:09.87 EL: Belgium - 3:26.24; CR: no record

DNE : AASSE
