= Israel at the 2023 European Games =

Israel's competition at the 2023 European Games

- IOC code: ISR
- NOC: Olympic Committee of Israel
- Website: www.olympicsil.co.il (in Hebrew)

in Kraków and Małopolska, Poland
- Competitors: 120 in 17 sports
- Flag bearers: Opening – Lonah Chemtai Salpeter and Joaquin Szuchman
- Medals Ranked 34th: Gold 1 Silver 1 Bronze 3 Total 5

European Games appearances (overview)
- 2015; 2019; 2023; 2027

Israel competed at the 2023 European Games in Kraków and Małopolska, Poland from 21 June to 2 July 2023.

== Medalists ==
Medal	Name	Sport	Event	Date
Gold	Eden Blecher; Shelly Bobritsky; Maya Dorf; Noy Gazala; Catherine Kunin; Aya Mazor; Nikol Nahshonov; Ariel Nassee; Neta Rubichek; Shani Sharaizin; Shaya Sar Shalom Nechmad	Artistic swimming	Free routine combination	23 June
Silver	Shachar Sagiv	Triathlon	Men's individual	28 June
Bronze	Gili Kuritzky	Fencing	Women's foil	25 June
Bronze	Eden Blecher; Shelly Bobritsky; Maya Dorf; Noy Gazala; Catherine Kunin; Aya Mazor; Nikol Nahshonov; Ariel Nassee; Neta Rubichek; Shani Sharaizin; Shaya Sar Shalom Nechmad	Artistic swimming	Team free routine	25 June
Bronze	Misha Zilberman	Badminton	Men's singles	1 July

== Competitors ==
The Israeli delegation include 32 athletes competing in 10 sports.

Sport	Men	Women	Total
Archery	2	1	3
Artistic swimming	0	11	11
Athletics	17	16	33
Badminton	1	2	3
Basketball	4	4	8
Boxing	5	0	5
Breaking	0	1	1
Canoe sprint	2	3	5
Cycling	3	1	4
Fencing	9	8	17
Judo	5	5	10
Karate	1	0	1
Modern pentathlon	0	1	1
Shooting	1	2	3
Sport climbing	2	1	3
Taekwondo	5	4	9
Triathlon	3	0	3
Total	60	60	120

== Archery ==
Men

Athlete	Event	Ranking round		Round of 64	Round of 32	Round of 16	Quarterfinal	Semi-final	Final / BM	Rank
Athlete	Event	Score	Seed	Opposition Score	Opposition Score	Opposition Score	Opposition Score	Opposition Score	Opposition Score	Rank
Roy Dror	Individual recurve	648	32	Kasprowski (POL); L 4–6	Did not advance					33
Shamai Yamrom	Individual compound	715	5	—N/a		Drakiotis (GRE); W 144–143	Przybylski (POL); L 146–149	Did not advance		6

Women

Athlete	Event	Ranking round		Round of 64	Round of 32	Round of 16	Quarterfinal	Semi-final	Final / BM	Rank
Athlete	Event	Score	Seed	Opposition Score	Opposition Score	Opposition Score	Opposition Score	Opposition Score	Opposition Score	Rank
Mikaella Moshe	Individual recurve	628	31	Čavič (SLO); L 4–6	Did not advance					33

Mixed

Athlete	Event	Ranking round		Round of 32	Round of 16	Quarterfinal	Semi-final	Final / BM	Rank
Athlete	Event	Score	Seed	Opposition Score	Opposition Score	Opposition Score	Opposition Score	Opposition Score	Rank
Roy Dror; Mikaella Moshe	Team recurve	1276	17	Switzerland (SUI); L 3–5	Did not advance				17

== Artistic swimming ==
Athlete	Event	Preliminary		Final	
Athlete	Event	Points	Rank	Points	Rank
Shelly Bobritsky; Ariel Nassee	Duet technical	—N/a		232.6433	6
Shelly Bobritsky; Ariel Nassee	Duet free	217.3688	3 Q	200.9250	4
Shelly Bobritsky; Noy Gazala; Aya Mazor; Ariel Nassee; Maya Dorf; Catherine Kunin; Nikol Nahshonov; Neta Rubichek; Eden Blecher; Shani Sharaizin	Team free	240.9771	4 Q	243.600	3rd place, bronze medalist(s)
Shelly Bobritsky; Noy Gazala; Aya Mazor; Ariel Nassee; Maya Dorf; Catherine Kunin; Nikol Nahshonov; Neta Rubichek; Eden Blecher; Shani Sharaizin	Acrobatic routine	—N/a		179.4000	4
Shelly Bobritsky; Noy Gazala; Aya Mazor; Ariel Nassee; Maya Dorf; Catherine Kunin; Nikol Nahshonov; Neta Rubichek; Eden Blecher; Shani Sharaizin	Free combination routine	—N/a		248.6083	1st place, gold medalist(s)

== Athletics ==
Israel compete in the third division of the 2023 European Athletics Team Championships. Israel finish in the third place and promote to the second division.

=== European Athletics Team Championships Third Division ===
Team	Event		Event points ***																			Total points	Rank
Team	Event		100m	200m	400m	800m	1500m	5000m	100m/110m h*	400m h	3000m SC	4 × 100 m	4 × 400 m**	LJ	TJ	HJ	PV	SP	DT	JT	HT	Total points	Rank
Israel (see below)	Team Championships First Division	Men	0	9	9	8	12	12	10	12	12	14	13	14	10	12.5	14	10	10	10	11	434	3
Israel (see below)	Team Championships First Division	Women	12	11	12	12	13	14	13	13	14	13	13	14	12	11.5	13	13	15	14	12	434	3

key: h: hurdles; SC: Steeplechase; LJ: Long Jump; TJ: Triple Jump; HJ: High jump; PV: Pole vault; SP: Shot put; DT: Discus throw; JT: Javelin throw; HT: Hammer throw

- Women compete at 100 metre hurdles, rather than 110 metre hurdles.
- 4 x 400 metres is held as a single mixed sex event
- Event points indicate placings in the Third Division match. Individual medals are across all three divisions.

=== Individual events at the 2023 European Games ===
As a participant in the Team event, each nation automatically enters one athlete in each of the individual events. Medals are awarded at the conclusion of the First Division program.

Event	Male Athlete	Score	Division rank	Overall rank	Female athlete	Score	Division rank	Overall rank
100 m	Blessing Akwasi Afrifah	DQ	–	–	Ilana Dorfman	12.01	4	35
200 m	Aviv Koffler	21.59 SB	7	37	Ilana Dorfman	24.43 (.424) PB	5	36
400 m	Eran Siboni	48.16 SB	7	36	Nitzan Asas	55.21 PB	4	32
800 m	Noam Mamu	1:56.05	8	40	Sivan Auerbach	2:07.12 SB	4	30
1500 m	Tadesse Getahon	3:45.92 PB	4	26	Sivan Auerbach	4:29.11	3	31
5000 m	Tadesse Getahon	14:19.86	4	29	Lonah Chemtai Salpeter	15:36.07	2	12
110/100 m h	Dor Hayon	15.40	6	37	Linoy Levy	13.88 SB	3	29
400m h	Noah Yasky	53.95	4	32	Noah Levy	58.72 PB	3	22
3000m SC	Tomer Mualem	8:53.87	4	22	Adva Cohen	9:47.52	2	9
4 × 100 m	Eden Sela; Thomas Dubnov-Raz; Aviv Koffler; Blessing Akwasi Afrifah	39.66 SB	2	14	Nitzan Asas; Ilana Dorfman; Alina Drutman; Hileni Mor	45.68 SB	3	23
4 × 400 m (mixed)	Eran Siboni; Shani Zakay; Noam Mamu; Nitzan Asas					3:27.57 SB	3	32
Long Jump	Ishay Ifraimov	7.70 SB	2	10	Romi Tamir	6.07 PB	2	22
Triple Jump	Guy Margalit	14.87	6	27	Romi Tamir	12.67	4	28
High jump	Ariel Atias	1.90 SB	=3	=35	Danielle Frenkel	1.70	=4	=34
Pole vault	Lev Skorish	4.90	2	27	Yarden Mantel	3.60	3	27
Shot put	Menachem Mendel Chen	15.87	6	36	Estel Valeanu	15.21	3	20
Discus throw	Denis Valiulin	52.14	6	31	Estel Valeanu	57.17	1	9
Javelin throw	Ariel Atias	57.99	6	37	Margaryta Dorozhon	47.23	2	26
Hammer throw	Yahav Adir	54.74 SB	5	33	Evgenia Zabolotni	54.94	4	32

== Badminton ==
Athlete	Event	Group stage				Round of 16	Quarterfinal	Semi-final	Final	Rank
Athlete	Event	Opposition Score	Opposition Score	Opposition Score	Rank	Opposition Score	Opposition Score	Opposition Score	Opposition Score	Rank
Misha Zilberman	Men's singles	Pauquet (LUX); W (21–8, 21–14)	Krapež (SLO); W (21–11, 21–10)	Barth (NOR); W (21–17, 21–18)	1 Q	Künzi (SUI); W (21–14, 19–21, 23–21)	Burestedt (SWE); W (17–21, 21–14, 21–19)	C Popov (FRA); L (10–21, 14–21)	Did not advance	3rd place, bronze medalist(s)
Ksenia Polikarpova	Women's singles	Vargová (SVK); ~~W (21–17, 21–17)~~	Stadelmann (SUI); L (10–21, 14–21)	Marín (ESP); L (15–21, 8–21)	3	Did not advance				17
Misha Zilberman; Svetlana Zilberman	Mixed doubles	Tabeling / Piek (NED); ~~L (10–21, 9–21)~~	Śmiłowski / Świerczyńska (POL); ~~L (11–21, 11–21)~~	Stoynov / Popovska (BUL) w/o	RET	—N/a	Did not advance			RET

== Basketball ==
Team	Event	Group stage				Quarterfinals	Semifinals	Final / BM	Rank
Team	Event	Opposition Score	Opposition Score	Opposition Score	Rank	Opposition Score	Opposition Score	Opposition Score	Rank
Ben Altit; Netanel Artzi; Tomer Assayag; Joaquin Szuchman	Men's tournament	France (FRA); W 20–18 (OT)	Czech Republic (CZE); L 16–19	Netherlands (NED); W 22–8	2 Q	Poland (POL); L 13–21	Did not advance		8
Shani Berman; Noor Kayuf; Ofir Kesten Raz; May Nesher	Women's tournament	Spain (ESP); L 12–21	Switzerland (SUI); L 17–20 (OT)	Netherlands (NED); W 20–19	2 Q	Romania (ROU); L 11–21	Did not advance		7

== Boxing ==
Men

Athlete	Event	Round of 64	Round of 32	Round of 16	Quarterfinal	Semi-final	Final	Rank
Athlete	Event	Opposition Result	Opposition Result	Opposition Result	Opposition Result	Opposition Result	Opposition Result	Rank
David Alaverdian	Flyweight (-51 kg)	—N/a	Bernáth (HUN); L 1–4	Did not advance				17
Ahmad Shtiwi	Light welterweight (-63.5 kg)	—N/a	Hovhannisyan (ARM); L 2-3	Did not advance				17
Miroslav Kapuler-Ishchenko	Light middleweight (-71 kg)	Bartl (CZE); W 5–0	Abasov (SRB); L 0–5	Did not advance				17
Daniel Ilyushonok	Light heavyweight (-80 kg)	—N/a	Shala (KOS); W KO	Aas (EST); L DSQ	Did not advance			9
Yan Zak	Heavyweight (-92 kg)	—N/a	Alfonso (AZE); W 4–1	Zaplitnii (MDA); W 4–1	Bereźnicki (POL); L 0–5	Did not advance		5

== Breaking ==
Athlete	Event	Group stage				Quarterfinal	Semifinal	Final / BM	Rank
Athlete	Event	Opposition Score	Opposition Score	Opposition Score	Rank	Opposition Score	Opposition Score	Opposition Score	Rank
Nadezda Gotlib; B-Girl Nadia	B-Girl	Vanessa (POR); D 1–1 (7–11)	Stefani (UKR); L 0–2 (0–18)	Camine (BEL); D 1–1 (9–9)	3	Did not advance			11

== Canoe Sprint ==
Athlete	Event	Heats		Semi-final		Final		Overall rank
Athlete	Event	Time	Rank	Time	Rank	Time	Rank	Overall rank
Stav Mizrahi	Men's K-1 200 m	35.964	6 SF	36.741	7	Did not advance		13
Ilya Podpolnyy	Men's K-1 500 m	1:45.801	4 SF	1:43.799	8 FB	1:42.875	7	16
Netta Malkinson	Women's K-1 200 m	45.337	7 SF	46.248	9	Did not advance		15
Darya Budouskaya	Women's K-1 500 m	2:01.127	7 SF	2:00.993	8	Did not advance		20
Netta Malkinson; Mia Meizeles	Women's K-2 500 m	1:54.775	8	Did not advance				16
Netta Malkinson; Stav Mizrahi	Mixed K-2 200 m	37.500	5 SF	36.098	8 FB	36.622	7	16

Qualification legend: SF – Qualify to semifinal; FA – Qualify to medal final; FB – Qualify to non-medal final

== Cycling ==
=== Mountain Bike ===
Athlete	Event	Time	Diff.	Rank
Gil Gonen	Men's cross country	1:25:27	+5:46	41
Eitan Levi	Men's cross country	-1 LAP		63
Tomer Zaltsman	Men's cross country	1:33:44	+14:03	58
Naama Noyman	Women's cross country	-1 LAP		41

== Fencing ==
Individuals

Athletes	Event	Group stage	Round of 64	Round of 32	Round of 16	Quarterfinals	Semifinals	Final	Rank
Athletes	Event	Group rank (Wins/Bouts)	Opposition Result	Opposition Result	Opposition Result	Opposition Result	Opposition Result	Opposition Result	Rank
Ori Finsterbush	Men's foil	6 (1/6)	Did not advance						60
Raz Goren	Men's foil	2 Q (4/6)	García-Alzórriz (ESP); W 15–11	Kahl (GER); L 12–15	Did not advance				26
Maor Hatoel	Men's foil	5 Q (2/6)	Rządkowski (POL); L 7–15	Did not advance					53
Roey Rosenfeld	Men's foil	5 Q (2/5)	Galuashvili (GEO); L 14–15	Did not advance					51
David Frumgarzts	Men's sabre	5 (2/6)	Kaczkowski (POL); L 14–15	Did not advance					38
Lior Druck	Women's foil	3 Q (4/6)	bye	Tucker (ESP); W 15–9	Beardmore (GBR); W 15–7	Walczyk-Klimaszyk (POL); L 13–15	Did not advance		6
May Kagan Tyagunov	Women's foil	7 (1/6)	Did not advance						47
Lihy Koren	Women's foil	6 (1/6)	Did not advance						45
Gili Kuritzky	Women's foil	3 Q (4/6)	bye	Kontochristopoulou (GRE); W 13–11	Cipressa (ITA); W 15–9	Petrova (UKR); W 15–14	Pásztor (HUN); L 7–15	Did not advance	3rd place, bronze medalist(s)

Teams

Athletes	Event	Round of 32	Round of 16	Quarterfinals	Placement matches			Semifinals	Final / BM	Rank
Athletes	Event	Opposition Result	Opposition Result	Opposition Result	Opposition Result	Opposition Result	Opposition Result	Opposition Result	Opposition Result	Rank
Grigori Beskin; Yonatan Cohen; Yuval Freilich; Ido Harper	Men's épée	bye	Poland (POL); L 42–45	Did not advance	Austria (AUT); W 45–36	Estonia (EST); W 45–41	Germany (GER); W 45–32	Did not advance		9
Ori Finsterbush; Raz Goren; Maor Hatoel; Roey Rosenfeld	Men's foil	bye	Germany (GER); L 32–45	Did not advance	Georgia (GEO); W 45–39	Croatia (CRO); W 45–40	Denmark (DEN); W 45–40	Did not advance		9
Adele Bogdanov; Yana Botvinnik; Nicole Feygin; Sophia Vainberg	Women's épée	bye	Romania (ROU); W 45–37	France (FRA); L 36–45	—N/a	Ukraine (UKR); L 34–45	Poland (POL); L 37–45	Did not advance		8
Lior Druck; May Kagan Tyagunov; Lihy Koren; Gili Kuritzky	Women's foil	—N/a	Germany (GER); L 33–45	Did not advance	bye	Great Britain (GBR); L 30–36	Romania (ROU); W 44–42	Did not advance		11

== Judo ==
Mixed team

Athlete	Category	Round of 32	Round of 16	Quarterfinals	Semifinals	Final	Rank
Athlete	Category	Opposition Result	Opposition Result	Opposition Result	Opposition Result	Opposition Result	Rank
Yehonatan Elbaz; Oron Giner; Roy Sivan; Nadav Zurat; Daniel Bershadsky; Romi Dori; Maya Leopold; Gaya Bar Or; Maya Kogan; Shoshana Kahlon; Yuli Alma Mishiner	Mixed team	bye	Turkey (TUR); L 1–4	Did not advance			9

=== Round of 16 ===
Weight Class	Israel	Result	Turkey	Score
Women –70 kg	Gaya Bar Or	00 – 10	Fidan Ögel	0 – 1
Men –90 kg	Nadav Zurat	00 – 01	Ömer Aydın	0 – 2
Women +70 kg	Yuli Alma Mishiner	11 – 01 (yellow card)	Kübranur Esir	1 – 2
Men +90 kg	Daniel Bershadsky	00 – 02	Münir Ertuğ	1 – 3
Women –57 kg	Maya Leopold	00 – 10	Hasret Bozkurt	1 – 4
Men –73 kg	Yehonatan Elbaz	—	Bayram Kandemir	—
Results

== Karate ==
Men

Athlete	Category	Group stage				Semifinals	Final	Rank
Athlete	Category	Opposition Result	Opposition Result	Opposition Result	Rank	Opposition Result	Opposition Result	Rank
Ronen Gehtbarg	-60 kg	Filipov (UKR); L 0–1	Crescenzo (ITA); D 0–0	Haas (GER); D 2–2	3	Did not advance		5

== Modern pentathlon ==
Athlete	Event	Stage	Group	Show jumping		Fencing				Swimming			Laser run			Points	Rank	Overall rank
Athlete	Event	Stage	Group	Rank	MP points	RR	Points	BR	Points	Time	Rank	MP points	Times	Rank	MP points	Points	Rank	Overall rank
Sharon Tal	Women's individual	Qualification	A	—N/a		11	222	—N/a		02:27.72	26	255	11:43.20	2	597	1074	7 Q	22
Sharon Tal	Women's individual	Semifinal	A	—N/a		11	225	+0	225	02:27.76	17	255	11:21.45	5	619	1099	12 r	22
Sharon Tal	Women's individual	Final	—N/a	Did not advance														22

== Shooting ==
Rifle

Athlete	Event	Qualification		Final	
Athlete	Event	Points	Rank	Points	Rank
Sergey Richter	Men's 10 m air rifle	629.3	7 Q	207.6	5
Olga Tashtchiev	Women's 10 m air rifle	628.9	7 Q	205.6	6
Tal Engler	Women's 10 m air rifle	610.1	37	Did not advance	
Tal Engler	Women's 50 m rifle three positions	580-28x	21	Did not advance	
Olga Tashtchiev; Sergey Richter	Mixed team 10 m air rifle	625.3	20	Did not advance	

== Sport climbing ==
Athlete	Event	Semifinal		Final	
Athlete	Event	Result	Rank	Result	Rank
Ram Levin	Men's boulder	0T3z 0 10	11	Did not advance	
Yuval Shemla	Men's lead	37+	5 Q	38	5
Yael Taub	Women's boulder	0T1z 0 5	14	Did not advance	

== Taekwondo ==
Men

Athlete	Event	Round of 32	Round of 16	Quarterfinal	Semi-final	Repechage	Final / BM	Rank
Athlete	Event	Opposition Result	Opposition Result	Opposition Result	Opposition Result	Opposition Result	Opposition Result	Rank
Tom Pashcovsky	-54 kg	—N/a	Dmitrov (MDA); W 2–0	Conti (ITA); L 0–2	Did not advance			9
Dmitriy Nagaev	-58 kg	—N/a	Vicente (ESP); L 0–2	Did not advance		Magomedov (AZE); L 0–2	Did not advance	7
Egor Rogozhine	-63 kg	—N/a	Alaphilippe (FRA); L 0–2	Did not advance				11
Nimrod Krivishkiy	-68 kg	—N/a	Lucien (FRA); L 0–2	Did not advance				11
Aleksandr Filippov	-80 kg	bye	Piątkowski (POL); L 1–2	Did not advance				11

=== Women ===
Athlete	Event	Round of 16	Quarterfinal	Semi-final	Repechage	Final / BM	Rank
Athlete	Event	Opposition Result	Opposition Result	Opposition Result	Opposition Result	Opposition Result	Rank
Rivka Bayech	-46 kg	Tammila (FIN); W 2–0	Çelik (GER); L 0–2	Did not advance			9
Avishag Semberg	-49 kg	Liñán (AND); W 2–0	Krajewska (POL); W 2–0	Cerezo (ESP); L 0–2	bye	Moore (GBR); L 1–2	5
Biana Lager	-53 kg	Meištininkaitė (LTU); W 2–1	Duvančić (CRO); L 0–2	Did not advance	Coman (ROU); W 2–0	Patakfalvy (HUN); L 0–2	5
Dana Azran	+73 kg	Boyadzhieva (BUL); L 0–2	Did not advance				11

== Triathlon ==
Athlete	Event	Swim (1.5 km)	Trans 1	Bike (40 km)	Trans 2	Run (10 km)	Total time	Rank
Itamar Eshed	Men's	19:28	0:56	Lapped				
Itamar Levanon	Men's	20:03	0:53	59:52	0:31	33:31	1:54:48	49
Shachar Sagiv	Men's	19:02	0:54	56:03	0:26	30:27	1:46:51	2nd place, silver medalist(s)
