= Taekwondo at the 2023 European Games =

Taekwondo competition

- Venue: Krynica-Zdrój Arena
- Location: Krynica-Zdrój, Poland
- Dates: 23–26 June
- Competitors: 246 from 44 nations

Taekwondo competitions at the 2023 European Games were held between 23 and 26 June 2023 at the Krynica-Zdrój Arena in Krynica-Zdrój. Taekwondo returned to the European Games for the second time, after being part of the inaugural edition at Baku 2015, and the G4 grading of the competition meant that ranking points won by athletes counted for the Paris 2024 Olympic Games qualification.

Athletes qualified by one of four routes. Firstly, in each class, the thirteen highest ranked European taekwodo-ka, respecting the limit of one per NOC per class were invited to compete. In addition, Poland as host got one taekwodo-ka in each class.

Athletes not yet selected, and whose NOCs who had not obtained a quota place in that class were able to fight for a spot at the European Games at a qualification tournament in Romania from 8 to 9 April. Finally, there was also a spot in each weight category reserved for a Universality place, which were awarded nearer the Games.

== Medal table ==
* Host nation (Poland)

Rank	Nation	Gold	Silver	Bronze	Total
1	Spain	4	2	3	9
2	Croatia	3	1	3	7
3	Turkey	2	1	3	6
4	Great Britain	2	1	2	5
5	Italy	1	1	2	4
6	Serbia	1	1	1	3
7	Denmark	1	0	1	2
8	Belgium	1	0	0	1
8	Georgia	1	0	0	1
10	Hungary	0	1	2	3
11	Azerbaijan	0	1	1	2
11	Czech Republic	0	1	1	2
13	Bosnia and Herzegovina	0	1	0	1
13	Ireland	0	1	0	1
13	North Macedonia	0	1	0	1
13	Norway	0	1	0	1
13	Poland*	0	1	0	1
13	Slovenia	0	1	0	1
19	France	0	0	5	5
20	Greece	0	0	3	3
21	Germany	0	0	2	2
22	Bulgaria	0	0	1	1
22	Cyprus	0	0	1	1
22	Latvia	0	0	1	1
Totals (24 entries)		16	16	32	64

== Medal summary ==
=== Men ===
Event	Gold	Silver	Bronze
Finweight (−54 kg)	Hugo Arillo; Spain	Sayyad Dadashov; Azerbaijan	Konstantinos Dimitropoulos; Greece
Finweight (−54 kg)	Hugo Arillo; Spain	Sayyad Dadashov; Azerbaijan	Andrea Conti; Italy
Flyweight (−58 kg)	Adrián Vicente; Spain	Jack Woolley; Ireland	Gashim Magomedov; Azerbaijan
Flyweight (−58 kg)	Adrián Vicente; Spain	Jack Woolley; Ireland	Cyrian Ravet; France
Bantamweight (−63 kg)	Dennis Baretta; Italy	Lovre Brečić; Croatia	Joan Jorquera; Spain
Bantamweight (−63 kg)	Dennis Baretta; Italy	Lovre Brečić; Croatia	Souleyman Alaphilippe; France
Featherweight (−68 kg)	Javier Pérez; Spain	Bradly Sinden; Great Britain	Otto Jørgensen; Denmark
Featherweight (−68 kg)	Javier Pérez; Spain	Bradly Sinden; Great Britain	Konstantinos Chamalidis; Greece
Lightweight (−74 kg)	Zurab Kintsurashvili; Georgia	Nedžad Husić; Bosnia and Herzegovina	Stefan Takov; Serbia
Lightweight (−74 kg)	Zurab Kintsurashvili; Georgia	Nedžad Husić; Bosnia and Herzegovina	Daniel Quesada; Spain
Welterweight (−80 kg)	Edi Hrnic; Denmark	Richard Ordemann; Norway	Apostolos Telikostoglou; Greece
Welterweight (−80 kg)	Edi Hrnic; Denmark	Richard Ordemann; Norway	Hüseyin Kartal; Turkey
Middleweight (−87 kg)	Ivan Šapina; Croatia	Patrik Divković; Slovenia	Raúl Martínez; Spain
Middleweight (−87 kg)	Ivan Šapina; Croatia	Patrik Divković; Slovenia	Kelen Bailey; Hungary
Heavyweight (+87 kg)	Caden Cunningham; Great Britain	Dejan Georgievski; North Macedonia	Emre Kutalmış Ateşli; Turkey
Heavyweight (+87 kg)	Caden Cunningham; Great Britain	Dejan Georgievski; North Macedonia	Paško Božić; Croatia

=== Women ===
Event	Gold	Silver	Bronze
Finweight (−46 kg)	Lena Stojković; Croatia	Sofia Zampetti; Italy	Kyriaki Kouttouki; Cyprus
Finweight (−46 kg)	Lena Stojković; Croatia	Sofia Zampetti; Italy	Süheda Nur Çelik; Germany
Flyweight (−49 kg)	Adriana Cerezo; Spain	Merve Dinçel; Turkey	Maddison Moore; Great Britain
Flyweight (−49 kg)	Adriana Cerezo; Spain	Merve Dinçel; Turkey	Supharada Kisskalt; Germany
Bantamweight (−53 kg)	Ivana Duvančić; Croatia	Alma Pérez; Spain	Luca Marta Patakfalvy; Hungary
Bantamweight (−53 kg)	Ivana Duvančić; Croatia	Alma Pérez; Spain	Dominika Hronová; Czech Republic
Featherweight (−57 kg)	Jade Jones; Great Britain	Luana Márton; Hungary	Kristina Tomić; Croatia
Featherweight (−57 kg)	Jade Jones; Great Britain	Luana Márton; Hungary	Hatice Kübra İlgün; Turkey
Lightweight (−62 kg)	Sarah Chaâri; Belgium	Petra Štolbová; Czech Republic	Aaliyah Powell; Great Britain
Lightweight (−62 kg)	Sarah Chaâri; Belgium	Petra Štolbová; Czech Republic	Jolanta Tarvida; Latvia
Welterweight (−67 kg)	Aleksandra Perišić; Serbia	Cecilia Castro; Spain	Natalia D'Angelo; Italy
Welterweight (−67 kg)	Aleksandra Perišić; Serbia	Cecilia Castro; Spain	Magda Wiet-Hénin; France
Middleweight (−73 kg)	Sude Yaren Uzunçavdar; Turkey	Nadica Božanić; Serbia	Nika Klepac; Croatia
Middleweight (−73 kg)	Sude Yaren Uzunçavdar; Turkey	Nadica Božanić; Serbia	Althéa Laurin; France
Heavyweight (+73 kg)	Nafia Kuş; Turkey	Aleksandra Kowalczuk; Poland	Solène Avoulète; France
Heavyweight (+73 kg)	Nafia Kuş; Turkey	Aleksandra Kowalczuk; Poland	Kalina Boyadzhieva; Bulgaria

== Participating nations ==
NOC	Men								Women								Total
NOC	-54 kg	-58 kg	-63 kg	-68 kg	-74 kg	-80 kg	-87 kg	+87 kg	-46 kg	-49 kg	-53 kg	-57 kg	-62 kg	-67 kg	-73 kg	+73 kg	Total
Albania			X														1
Andorra										X							1
Armenia					X												1
Austria						X						X				X	3
Azerbaijan	X	X		X	X		X		X	X				X			8
Belgium					X							X	X				3
Bosnia and Herzegovina					X		X			X							3
Bulgaria	X		X	X	X					X						X	6
Croatia	X		X	X	X	X	X	X	X	X	X	X	X	X	X	X	15
Cyprus			X			X	X	X	X		X				X	X	8
Czech Republic						X					X		X	X			4
Denmark			X	X		X					X						4
EOC Refugee Team						X			X								2
Finland			X						X	X		X	X				5
France		X	X	X	X	X		X	X	X				X	X	X	11
Georgia					X												1
Germany	X	X	X				X	X	X	X	X		X	X	X	X	12
Great Britain	X	X		X				X	X	X	X	X	X	X	X	X	12
Greece	X	X		X		X	X	X				X	X	X	X	X	11
Hungary		X		X			X		X		X	X	X	X	X	X	10
Iceland												X					1
Ireland		X			X												2
Israel	X	X	X	X		X			X	X	X					X	9
Italy	X	X	X			X		X	X	X	X	X	X	X	X		12
Kosovo						X											1
Latvia													X				1
Lithuania											X	X					2
Luxembourg														X			1
Moldova	X	X						X									3
Montenegro				X											X		2
Netherlands	X	X						X				X		X			5
North Macedonia								X					X		X		3
Norway					X	X		X					X	X	X		6
Poland	X	X	X	X	X	X	X	X	X	X	X	X	X	X	X	X	16
Portugal		X				X						X					3
Romania							X				X						2
Serbia			X		X				X		X		X	X	X		7
Slovakia											X						1
Slovenia	X				X		X	X									4
Spain	X	X	X	X	X	X	X	X	X	X	X	X	X	X		X	15
Sweden	X	X		X	X								X				5
Switzerland				X													1
Turkey	X	X	X	X	X	X	X	X	X	X	X	X		X	X	X	15
Ukraine			X	X		X	X	X	X						X	X	8
Total: 44 NOCs	15	16	15	16	16	17	13	16	16	14	16	15	16	16	15	14	246
