= Muaythai at the 2023 European Games – Men's 67 kg =

Muaythai competition

Men's 67 kg at the 2023 European Games
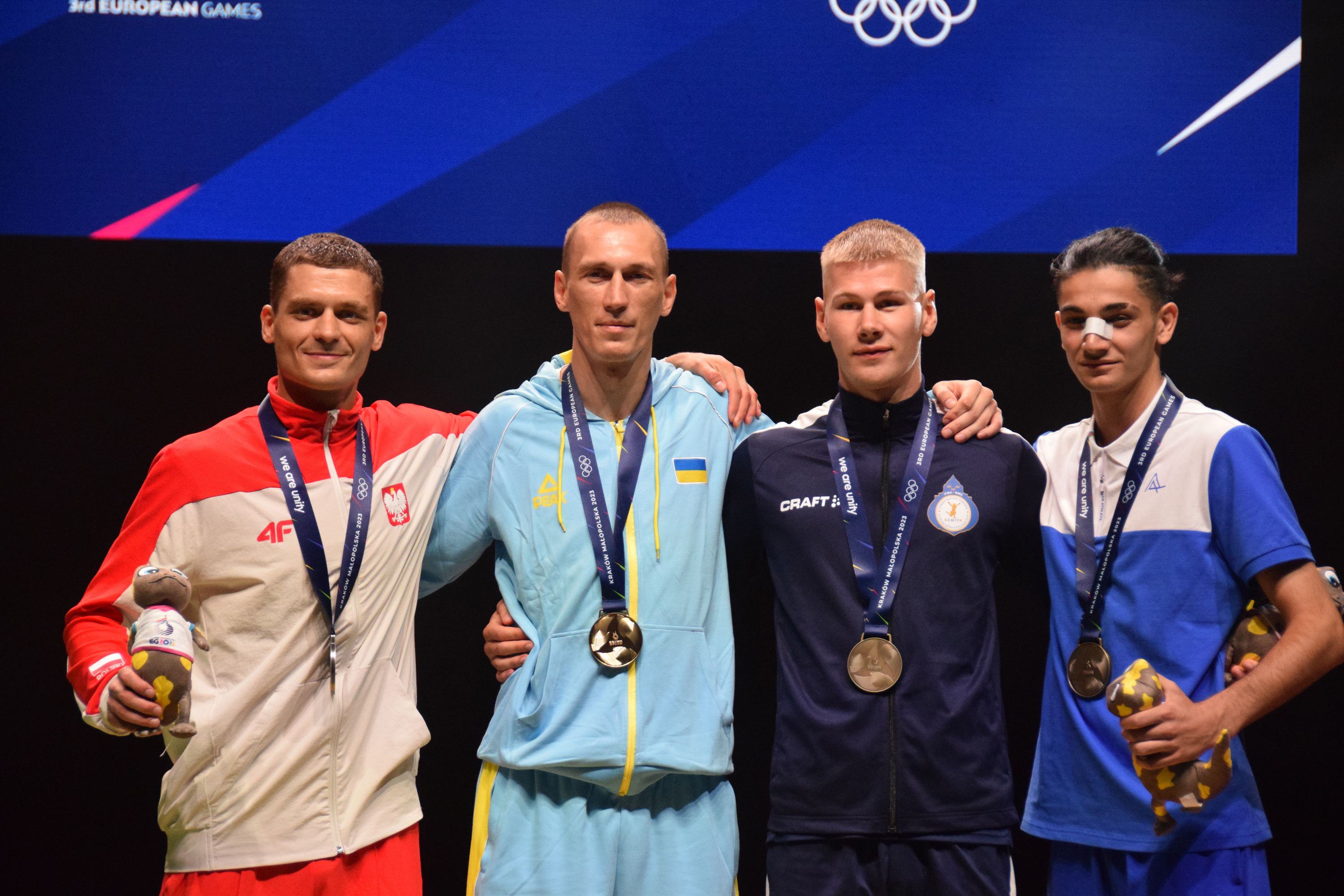
- Venue: Myślenice Arena
- Date: 25–28 June
- Competitors: 8 from 8 nations

Medalists
gold medal	Igor Liubchenko	Ukraine
silver medal	Oskar Siegert	Poland
bronze medal	Khayal Aliyev	Azerbaijan
bronze medal	Sven Linus Bylander	Sweden

Men's 67 kg competition at the Muaythai at the 2023 European Games in Kraków, Poland, took place on 25–28 June at the Myślenice Arena.

== Results ==
Quarterfinals
Gor Sargsyan (ARM)
Oskar Siegert (POL)	RSCS R2
Giorgi Klein (GEO)
Khayal Aliyev (AZE)	RSCI R2
Igor Liubchenko (UKR)	RSCS R3
Dimos Asimakopoulos (GRE)
Javier Segura Saez (ESP)	26
Sven Linus Bylander (SWE)	30

Semifinals
Oskar Siegert (POL)	RSCH R3
Khayal Aliyev (AZE)
Igor Liubchenko (UKR)	30
Sven Linus Bylander (SWE)	27

Final
Oskar Siegert (POL)	28
Igor Liubchenko (UKR)	29
