= Azerbaijan at the 2023 European Games =

- IOC code: AZE
- NOC: National Olympic Committee of the Republic of Azerbaijan
- Website: www.olympic.az

in Kraków and Małopolska, Poland 20 June 2023 – 2 July 2023
- Competitors: 100 in 14 sports
- Flag bearers: Barat Guliyev, Yaylagul Ramazanova – Opening Ceremony
- Medals Ranked 24th: Gold 3 Silver 2 Bronze 6 Total 11

European Games appearances (overview)
- 2015; 2019; 2023; 2027

Azerbaijan participated in the 2023 European Games held in Kraków and Małopolska from 20 June to 2 July 2023. Azerbaijan were represented in 14 sports by a total of 100 competitors across the games.

== Competitors ==
Azerbaijan will be represented by 100 athletes in 14 sports.

Sport	Men	Women	Total
Archery	0	1	1
Athletics	8	6	14
Badminton	2	2	4
Beach soccer	12	0	12
Boxing	7	5	12
Fencing	7	4	11
Judo	6	5	11
Karate	4	4	8
Kickboxing	2	0	2
Muaythai	2	2	4
Padel	0	2	2
Shooting	1	9	10
Taekwondo	5	3	8
Triathlon	1	0	1
Total	57	43	100

== Medalists ==
Medal	Name	Sport	Event	Date
1st place, gold medalist(s)	Tural Aghalarzada	Karate	Men's kumite -67 kg	22 June
1st place, gold medalist(s)	Iryna Zaretska	Karate	Women's kumite -68 kg	23 June
1st place, gold medalist(s)	Farid Aghamoghlanov	Kickboxing	Men's full contact -63.5 kg	2 July
2nd place, silver medalist(s)	Sayyad Dadashov	Taekwonde	Men's -54 kg	23 June
2nd place, silver medalist(s)	Mahammad Abdullayev	Boxing	Men's +92 kg	2 July
3rd place, bronze medalist(s)	Asiman Gurbanli	Karate	Men's kumite +84 kg	23 June
3rd place, bronze medalist(s)	Gashim Magomedov	Taekwondo	Men's -58 kg	23 June
3rd place, bronze medalist(s)	Khayal Aliyev	Muaythai	Men's -67 kg	27 June
3rd place, bronze medalist(s)	Aysu Dhevrishova	Muaythai	Women's -57 kg	27 June
3rd place, bronze medalist(s)	Emili Rzayeva	Muaythai	Women's -63.5 kg	27 June
3rd place, bronze medalist(s)	Murad Allahverdiyev	Boxing	Men's -80 kg	28 June

== Archery ==
Athlete	Event	Ranking round		Round of 32	Round of 16	Quarterfinals	Semifinals	Final / BM	
Athlete	Event	Score	Seed	Opposition Score	Opposition Score	Opposition Score	Opposition Score	Opposition Score	Rank
Yaylagul Ramazanova	Women's individual	645	23	Ramanauskaitė (LTU); L 5-6	Did Not Advance				33

== Athletics ==
Azerbaijan is set to compete in the third division of the 2023 European Athletics Team Championships which is going to be held in Chorzów during the games.

=== European Athletics Team Championships Third Division ===
Team	Event		Event points																			Total	Rank
Team	Event		100m	200m	400m	800m	1500m	5000m	110m h*	400m h	3000m SC	4 × 100 m	4 × 400 m**	SP	JT	HT	DT	PV	HJ	TJ	LJ	Total	Rank
Azerbaijan	Team Championships Third Division	Men	5	6	6	2	5	4	0	10	0	9	9	9	0	0	6	0	0	14	8	180	13
Azerbaijan	Team Championships Third Division	Women	6	6	11	6	10	11	0	0	0	0	9	0	0	15	0	0	0	15	7	180	13

key: h: hurdles; SC; Steeplechase: SP; Shot put: JT: Javelin: HT: Hammer: DT: Discus: PV: Pole vault: HJ: High jump: TJ: Triple Jump: LJ: Long Jump

- Women compete at 100 metre hurdles, rather than 110 metre hurdles.
- 4 x 400 metres is held as a single mixed sex event

=== Individual Events at the 2023 European Games ===
As a participant in the Team event, each nation automatically enters one athlete in each of the individual events.

Event	Male Athlete	Score	Division ranking	Overall ranking	Female athlete	Score	Division ranking	Overall ranking
100m	Aleksey Aliakbarov	11.23	11	43	Ilaha Guliyeva	12.39	1	42
200m	Aleksey Aliakbarov	11.23	10	41	Ilaha Guliyeva	25.33	10	42
400m	Javid Mammadov	48.58	10	42	Lamiya Valiyeva	55.79	5	33
800m	Elman Abishov	2:06.12	14	46	Anna Yusupova	2:17.33	10	40
1500m	Elman Abishov	4:18.19	11	43	Anna Yusupova	4:38.00	6	36
5000m	Elman Abishov	16:26.70	12	43	Anna Yusupova	17:37.97	5	35
110m/100m h	No athlete				No athlete			
400m h	Javid Mammadov	55.76	6	34	No athlete			
3000m SC	No athlete				No athlete			
4 × 100 m	Aleksey Aliakbarov; Ali Abdiyev; Gadir Gurbanov; Kasgin Abbaszade	42.63	7	33	No team			
4 × 400 m (mixed)	—N/a				Javid Mammadov; Lamiya Valiyeva; Ali Abdiyev; Ilaha Guliyeva	3:31.55	7	39
Shot Put	Ismail Aliyev	15.84	7	37	No athlete			
Javelin	No athlete				No athlete			
Hammer	No athlete				Hanna Skydan	71.69	1	4
Discus	Ismail Aliyev	44.83	10	41	No athlete			
Pole Vault	No athlete				No athlete			
High Jump	No athlete				No athlete			
Triple Jump	Alexis Copello	15.91	2	10	Yekaterina Sariyeva	13.38	1	14
Long Jump	Kasgin Abbaszade	7.12	8	34	Fakhriyya Taghizade	5.14	9	40

== Badminton ==
Athlete	Event	Group stage				Round of 16	Quarterfinal	Semifinal	Final	
Athlete	Event	Opposition Score	Opposition Score	Opposition Score	Rank	Opposition Score	Opposition Score	Opposition Score	Opposition Score	Rank
Ade Resky Dwicahyo	Men's singles	Peñalver (ESP); W 2-1	Yanakiev (BUL); W 2-1	Bosniuk (UKR); W 2-0	1 Q	Koljonen (FIN); L 0-2	Did Not Advance			
Keisha Fatimah Azzahra	Women's singles	Golubickaitė (LTU); W 2-0	Ginga (MDA); W 2-0	Li (GER); W 2-1	1 Q	Stadelmann (SUI); L 1-2	Did Not Advance			
Ade Resky Dwicahyo; Azmy Qowimuramadhoni	Men's doubles	Lane/Vendy (GBR); L 0-2	Greco/Salutt (ITA); L 1-2	Magee/Reynolds (IRL); W 2-1	3	—N/a	Did Not Advance			
Keisha Fatimah Azzahra; Era Maftuha	Women's doubles	Azurmendi/Corrales (ESP); L 0-2	Jille/Seinen (NED); L 0-2	Au Yeong/Hochmeir (AUT); W 2-1	3	—N/a	Did Not Advance			

== Beach soccer ==
Team	Event	Group stage				Semifinals / Pl	Final / BM / Pl	
Team	Event	Opposition Score	Opposition Score	Opposition Score	Rank	Opposition Score	Opposition Score	Rank
Azerbaijan	Men's tournament	Poland; L 2-7	Portugal; L 2-5	Spain; L 1-7	4	Ukraine; W 7-6 (a.e.t.)	Moldova; W 4-2	5

== Boxing ==
Athlete	Event	Round of 64	Round of 32	Round of 16	Quarterfinal	Semifinal	Final	
Athlete	Event	Opposition Result	Opposition Result	Opposition Result	Opposition Result	Opposition Result	Opposition Result	Rank
Masud Yusifzada	Men's -51 kg	—N/a	Bye	Bernath (HUN); L 0-5	Did Not Advance			9
Umid Rustamov	Men's -57 kg	—N/a	Veres (HUN); L 0-5	Did Not Advance				17
Malik Hasanov	Men's -63.5 kg	—N/a	Roskowicz (POL); W 5-0	Clancy (IRL); L 2-3	Did Not Advance			9
Sarkhan Aliyev	Men's -71 kg	Bye	Takacs (SVK); W 5-0	Madiev (GEO); W 3-2	Traore (FRA); L 2-3	Did Not Advance		5
Murad Allahverdiyev	Men's -80 kg	—N/a	Schumann (GER); W RSC	Nystedt (FIN); W 4-1	Hakobyan (ARM); W 5-0	Veocic (CRO); L 0-5	Did Not Advance	3rd place, bronze medalist(s)
Loren Berto Alfonso Dominguez	Men's -92 kg	—N/a	Zak (ISR); L 1-4	Did Not Advance				17
Mahammad Abdullayev	Men's +92 kg	—N/a	Aydemir (TUR); W RSC	Begadze (GEO); W 3-1	Roulias (GRE); W 5-0	Tiafack (GER); W 4-1	Orie (GBR); L 0-5	2nd place, silver medalist(s)
Anakhanim Ismayilova	Women's -50 kg	—N/a	Bye	De Pinho Soares (POR); L DSQ	Did Not Advance			9
Zeynab Rahimova	Women's -54 kg	—N/a	Perijoc (ROU); L RSC	Did Not Advance				17
Mahsati Hamzayeva Aghamaliy	Women's -57 kg	—N/a	Bye	Khachatryan (ARM); W 5-0	Zidani (FRA); L 0-5	Did Not Advance		5
Shahla Allahverdiyeva	Women's -66 kg	—N/a	Bye	Derieuw (BEL); L 0-5	Did Not Advance			9
Aynur Rzayeva	Women's -75 kg	—N/a	Bye	Schoenberger (GER); L 0-5	Did Not Advance			9

== Fencing ==
Athlete	Event	Preliminaries	Round of 128	Round of 64	Round of 32	Round of 16	Quarterfinal	Semifinal	Final	
Athlete	Event	W/B	Opposition Result	Opposition Result	Opposition Result	Opposition Result	Opposition Result	Opposition Result	Opposition Result	Rank
Aykhan Khasiyev	Men's individual sabre	1/6	—N/a	Did Not Advance						54
Magsud Huseynli	Men's individual sabre	1/6	—N/a	Did Not Advance						51
Murad Akbarov	Men's individual sabre	2/6	—N/a	Bravo (ESP); L 9-15	Did Not Advance					37
Saleh Mammadov	Men's individual sabre	2/5	—N/a	Szczepanik (POL); L 5-15	Did Not Advance					36
Ruslan Hasanov	Men's individual épée	4/6	Bye	Favre (SUI); L 14-15	Did Not Advance					42
Kanan Aliyev	Men's individual épée	2/6	Eskov (EST); L 13-15	Did Not Advance						70
Barat Guliyev	Men's individual épée	2/6	Did Not Advance							72
Valeriya Bolshakova	Women's individual sabre	3/6	—N/a	Funke (GER); W 15-11	Karimova (AZE); L 12-15	Did Not Advance				28
Anna Bashta	Women's individual sabre	5/6	—N/a	Bye	Kozaczuk (POL); L 11-15	Did Not Advance				17
Sabina Karimova	Women's individual sabre	5/6	—N/a	Bye	Bolshakova (AZE); W 15-12	Katona (HUN); L 12-15	Did Not Advance			11
Palina Kaspiarovich	Women's individual sabre	1/6	—N/a	Did Not Advance						45
Murad Akbarov; Magsud Huseynli; Aykhan Khasiyev; Saleh Mammadov	Men's team sabre	—N/a				Hungary; L 25-45	Turkey; L 31-45	Greece; W 45-43	Ireland; W 45-30	13
Kanan Aliyev; Barat Guliyev; Ruslan Hasanov	Men's team épée	—N/a			Estonia; L 41-43	Did Not Advance				18
Anna Bashta; Valeriya Bolshakova; Sabina Karimova; Palina Kaspiarovich	Women's team sabre	—N/a				Romania; W 45-42	Italy; L 42-45	Greece; W 45-29	Spain; L 42-45	6

== Judo ==
Athlete	Category	Round of 32	Round of 16	Quarterfinals	Semifinals	Final	
Athlete	Category	Opposition Result	Opposition Result	Opposition Result	Opposition Result	Opposition Result	Rank
Sudaba Aghayeva; Fidan Alizada; Narmin Amirli; Dzhamal Gamzatkhanov; Eljan Hajiyev; Gunel Hasanli; Rashid Mammadaliev; Nariman Mirzayev; Nigar Suleymanova; Vugar Talibov; Imran Yusifov	Mixed team	Czech Republic; W 4-1	France; L 0-4	Did Not Advance			9

== Karate ==
Athlete	Event	Group Stage				Semifinal	Final	
Athlete	Event	Opposition Result	Opposition Result	Opposition Result	Rank	Opposition Result	Opposition Result	Rank
Aminagha Guliyev	Men's kumite -60 kg	Xenos (GRE); L 1-2	Şamdan (TUR); L 0-7	Kwasniewski (POL); W 1-0	3	Did Not Advance		5
Tural Aghalarzada	Men's kumite -67 kg	Tadassi (HUN); W 4-0	Pisino (SUI); W 5-3	Xenos (GRE); W 2-0	1 Q	Sabiecki (POL); W 4-3	Xenos (GRE); W 0-0	1st place, gold medalist(s)
Farid Aghayev	Men's kumite -75 kg	Zaplitnyi (UKR); L 1-2	De Vivo (ITA); L 2-5	Goncalves dos Santos (POR); 0-0	3	Did Not Advance		5
Asiman Gurbanli	Men's kumite +84 kg	Seck Sakho (ESP); W 6-4	Arkania (GEO); L 1-2	Bostandzic (BIH); W 9-1	2 Q	Kvesić (CRO); L 3-5	Did Not Advance	3rd place, bronze medalist(s)
Fidan Teymurova	Women's kumite -50 kg	Perfetto (ITA); L 1-5	Hubrich (GER); W 3-1	Ozcelik Arapoglu (TUR); L 1-3	3	Did Not Advance		5
Madina Sadigova	Women's kumite -55 kg	Goranova (BUL); L 1-3	Kerner (POL); W 3-0	Warling (LUX); L 2-3	3	Did Not Advance		5
Iryna Zaretska	Women's kumite -68 kg	Melnyk (UKR); W 5-0	Makyan (ARM); W 8-0	Nieto Mejias (ESP); W 4-3	1 Q	Agier (FRA); W 3-0	Quirici (SUI); W 4-1	1st place, gold medalist(s)
Farida Aliyeva	Women's kumite +68 kg	Torres Garcia (ESP); L 2-4	Ferracuti (ITA); L 2-4	Lesjak (CRO); L 0-4	4	Did Not Advance		7

== Kickboxing ==
Athlete	Category	Quarterfinals	Semifinals	Final/BM	
Athlete	Category	Opposition Result	Opposition Result	Opposition Result	Rank
Farid Aghamoghlanov	Men's full contact -63.5 kg	Barak (SVK); W 3-0	Barrios Galarreta (NOR); W 3-0	Tramontana (ITA); W 3-0	1st place, gold medalist(s)
Elshad Shahbazov	Men's full contact -86 kg	Melnyk (UKR); L 0-3	Did Not Advance		5

== Muaythai ==
Athlete	Event	Quarterfinal	Semifinal	Final	Rank
Athlete	Event	Opposition Result	Opposition Result	Opposition Result	Rank
Khayal Aliyev	Men's -67 kg	Klein (GEO); W RSC	Siegert (POL); L RSC	Did Not Advance	3rd place, bronze medalist(s)
Mahabbat Humbatov	Men's -71 kg	Rajewski (POL); L 28-29	Did Not Advance		5
Aysu Devrishova	Women's -57 kg	Pitesa (CRO); W 30-26	Axling (SWE); L	Did Not Advance	3rd place, bronze medalist(s)
Emili Rzayeva	Women's -63.5 kg	Cornolle (FRA); W w/o	Stechova (CZE); L RSC	Did Not Advance	3rd place, bronze medalist(s)

== Padel ==
Athlete	Event	Round of 32	Round of 16	Quarterfinal	Semifinal	Final	
Athlete	Event	Opposition Result	Opposition Result	Opposition Result	Opposition Result	Opposition Result	Rank
Samira Aliiyeva; Narmina Baghirova	Women's doubles	Pappacena/Sussarello (ITA); L 0-2	Did Not Advance				

== Shooting ==
Athlete	Event	Qualification				Final / BM	
Athlete	Event	Score	Rank	Score	Rank	Score	Rank
Ruslan Lunev	Men's 10m air pistol	577	11	—N/a		Did Not Advance	
Ruslan Lunev	Men's 25m rapid fire pistol	292	6	581	6	9	8
Nigar Nasirova	Women's 10m air pistol	565	25	—N/a		Did Not Advance	
Nigar Nasirova	Women's 25m rapid fire pistol	282	30	568	25	Did Not Advance	
Nazrin Abbasli	Women's 10m air pistol	557	35	—N/a		Did Not Advance	
Rigina Meftakhetdinova	Women's skeet	70	12	115	18	Did Not Advance	
Nurlana Jafarova	Women's skeet	67	20	109	26	Did Not Advance	
Aydan Jamalova	Women's trap	68	19	114	15	Did Not Advance	
Ulviyya Eyvazova	Women's trap	64	27	105	29	Did Not Advance	
Nigar Nasirova; Narmina Samadova; Nazrin Abbasli	Women's team 10m air pistol	826	9	Did Not Advance			
Nurlana Jafarova; Rigina Meftakhetdinova; Sevda Najafova	Women's team skeet	196	4 QB	—N/a		Czech Republic; L 0-6	4
Aydan Jamalova; Ulviyya Eyvazova; Alina Rafikhanova	Women's team trap	187	5	—N/a		Did Not Advance	
Ruslan Lunev; Nigar Nasirova	Mixed team 10m air pistol	572	17	—N/a		Did Not Advance	
Ruslan Lunev; Nigar Nasirova	Mixed team 25m rapid fire pistol	525	9	Did Not Advance			

== Taekwondo ==
Athlete	Events	Round of 16	Quarterfinal	Semifinal/Repechage	Final/BM	
Athlete	Events	Opponent Score	Opponent Score	Opponent Score	Opponent Score	Rank
Sayyad Dadashov	Men's -54 kg	Abdel Halim (GER); W 2-0	Bogdanov (BUL); W 2-0	Marwan (SWE); W 2-0	Arillo Vazquez (ESP); L 1-2	2nd place, silver medalist(s)
Gashim Magomedov	Men's -58 kg	Achnine (NED); W 2-0	Vicente Yunta (ESP); L 0-2	Nagaev (ISR); W 2-0	Lomartire (ITA); W 2-0	3rd place, bronze medalist(s)
Javad Aghayev	Men's -68 kg	Chamalidis (GRE); L 1-2	Did Not Advance			11
Eltaj Gafarov	Men's -74 kg	Cudnoch (POL); W WDR	Takov (SRB); L 0-2	Did Not Advance		9
Taleh Suleymanov	Men's -87 kg	Bachmann (GER); L 1-2	Did Not Advance			11
Minaya Akbarova	Women's -46 kg	Zampetti (ITA); L 0-2	—N/a	Pouryounes (ERT); W 2-0	Kouttouki (CYP); L 0-2	5
Patimat Abakarova	Women's -49 kg	Kisskalt (GER); L 0-2	Did Not Advance			11
Farida Azizova	Women's -67 kg	Mitsopoulou (GRE); L 1-2	Did Not Advance			11

== Triathlon ==
Athlete	Event	Swim		T1		Bike		T2		Total	
Athlete	Event	Time	Rank	Time	Rank	Time	Rank	Time	Rank	Time	Rank
Rostislav Pevtsov	Men's individual	18:41	29	19:33	28	1:16:02	26	1:16:29	23	1:46:58	6
