= Canoe sprint at the 2023 European Games – Men's K-1 500 metres =

Men's K-1 500 metres at the 2023 European Games
- Venue: Kryspinów Waterway
- Date: 23–24 June
- Competitors: 22 from 22 nations
- Winning time: 1:36.212

Medalists
gold medal	Ádám Varga	Hungary
silver medal	Fernando Pimenta	Portugal
bronze medal	Marko Dragosavljević	Serbia

The men's K-1 500 metres canoe sprint competition at the 2023 European Games took place on 23 and 24 June at the Kryspinów Waterway.

== Schedule ==
All times are local (UTC+2).

Date	Time	Round
Friday, 23 June 2023	9:58	Heats
Friday, 23 June 2023	16:58	Semifinals
Saturday, 24 June 2023	12:14	Final B
Saturday, 24 June 2023	12:39	Final A

== Results ==
=== Heats ===
==== Heat 1 ====
Rank	Kayaker	Country	Time	Notes
1	Moritz Florstedt	Germany	1:40.401	QA
2	Martin Nathell	Sweden	1:42.408	QS
3	Andrej Olijnik	Lithuania	1:43.735	QS
4	Roberts Pumpa	Latvia	1:46.075	QS
5	Taha Usta	Turkey	1:46.102	QS
6	Jakub Špicar	Czech Republic	1:50.016	QS
7	Vladimir Maleski	North Macedonia	2:01.370	QS
8	Anže Urankar	Slovenia	2:01.897	

==== Heat 2 ====
Rank	Kayaker	Country	Time	Notes
1	Ádám Varga	Hungary	1:40.110	QA
2	Timon Maurer	Austria	1:41.211	QS
3	Étienne Hubert	France	1:41.267	QS
4	Ilya Podpolnyy	Israel	1:45.801	QS
5	Milan Dörner	Slovakia	1:46.364	QS
6	Giacomo Cinti	Italy	1:47.464	QS
	Kevin Poljans	Estonia	DSQ	

==== Heat 3 ====
Rank	Kayaker	Country	Time	Notes
1	Marko Dragosavljević	Serbia	1:39.783	QA, GB
2	Przemysław Korsak	Poland	1:41.083	QS
3	Fernando Pimenta	Portugal	1:41.950	QS
4	Íñigo Peña	Spain	1:43.100	QS
5	Magnus Sibbersen	Denmark	1:44.327	QS
6	Eetu Kolehmainen	Finland	1:44.560	QS
7	Gunnar Eide	Norway	1:48.794	QS

=== Semifinals ===
==== Semifinal 1 ====
Rank	Kayaker	Country	Time	Notes
1	Jakub Špicar	Czech Republic	1:39.091	QA, GB
2	Gunnar Eide	Norway	1:39.591	QA
3	Przemysław Korsak	Poland	1:39.687	QA
4	Étienne Hubert	France	1:40.331	QB
5	Andrej Olijnik	Lithuania	1:40.367	QB
6	Giacomo Cinti	Italy	1:40.451	QB
7	Íñigo Peña	Spain	1:40.543	QB
8	Ilya Podpolnyy	Israel	1:43.799	qB
9	Taha Usta	Turkey	1:45.664	

==== Semifinal 2 ====
Rank	Kayaker	Country	Time	Notes
1	Fernando Pimenta	Portugal	1:39.514	QA
2	Timon Maurer	Austria	1:39.922	QA
3	Martin Nathell	Sweden	1:41.951	QA
4	Eetu Kolehmainen	Finland	1:43.911	QB
5	Magnus Sibbersen	Denmark	1:43.923	QB
6	Milan Dörner	Slovakia	1:44.373	QB
7	Roberts Pumpa	Latvia	1:55.234	QB
8	Vladimir Maleski	North Macedonia	2:02.604	

=== Finals ===
==== Final B ====
Rank	Kayaker	Country	Time
10	Giacomo Cinti	Italy	1:39.419
11	Íñigo Peña	Spain	1:39.447
12	Étienne Hubert	France	1:39.627
13	Magnus Sibbersen	Denmark	1:39.991
14	Andrej Olijnik	Lithuania	1:40.359
15	Eetu Kolehmainen	Finland	1:41.523
16	Ilya Podpolnyy	Israel	1:42.875
17	Milan Dörner	Slovakia	1:43.003
18	Roberts Pumpa	Latvia	1:57.536

==== Final A ====
Rank	Kayaker	Country	Time
1st place, gold medalist(s)	Ádám Varga	Hungary	1:36.212 GB
2nd place, silver medalist(s)	Fernando Pimenta	Portugal	1:37.358
3rd place, bronze medalist(s)	Marko Dragosavljević	Serbia	1:37.806
4	Przemysław Korsak	Poland	1:38.284
5	Jakub Špicar	Czech Republic	1:38.310
6	Timon Maurer	Austria	1:38.584
7	Moritz Florstedt	Germany	1:38.608
8	Gunnar Eide	Norway	1:39.466
9	Martin Nathell	Sweden	1:41.239
