= Boxing at the 2023 European Games – Men's light welterweight =

Men's light welterweight boxing at the 2023 European Games
- Venue: Nowy Targ Arena
- Location: Nowy Targ, Poland
- Dates: 23 June – 1 July
- Competitors: 31 from 31 nations

Medalists
| gold medal | Sofiane Oumiha | France |
| silver medal | Lasha Guruli | Georgia |
| bronze medal | Dean Clancy | Ireland |
| bronze medal | Richárd Kovács | Hungary |

The men's light welterweight boxing event at the 2023 European Games was held between 23 June and 1 July 2023.

== Results ==
=== Finals ===
Semi-finals
Dean Clancy (IRL) | 0
Sofiane Oumiha (FRA) | 5
Lasha Guruli (GEO) | 5
Richárd Kovács (HUN) | 0

Final
Sofiane Oumiha (FRA) | 4
Lasha Guruli (GEO) | 1

=== Top half ===
==== Section 1 ====
Round of 32
Gianluigi Malanga (ITA) | 5
İlhan Özmen (MKD) | 0
Bartłomiej Rośkowicz (POL) | 0
Malik Hasanov (AZE) | 5
Arsen Chabyan (AUT) | 0
Dean Clancy (IRL) | 5

Round of 16
Petr Novák (CZE) | 1
Gianluigi Malanga (ITA) | 4
Malik Hasanov (AZE) | 2
Dean Clancy (IRL) | 3

Quarterfinals
Gianluigi Malanga (ITA) | 0
Dean Clancy (IRL) | 5

==== Section 2 ====
Round of 32
Assan Hansen (GER) | 4
Yaroslav Khartsyz (UKR) | 1
Sofiane Oumiha (FRA) | 5
Aljaž Šircelj (SLO) | 0
Shpetim Bajoku (KOS) | 4
Mateo Komadina (CRO) | 1
Alexandros Christodoulou (CYP) | 0
Bilge Kağan Kanlı (TUR) | 5

Round of 16
Assan Hansen (GER) | 1
Sofiane Oumiha (FRA) | 4
Shpetim Bajoku (KOS) | 2
Bilge Kağan Kanlı (TUR) | 3

Quarterfinals
Sofiane Oumiha (FRA) | 5
Bilge Kağan Kanlı (TUR) | 0

=== Bottom half ===
==== Section 3 ====
Round of 32
Reese Lynch (GBR) | 5
Mārcis Grundulis (LAT) | 0
Wael Mejri (BIH) | 0
Radoslav Rosenov (BUL) | 4
Semjon Kamanin (EST) | 1
Viliam Tankó (SVK) | 4
Adrián Thiam (ESP) | 2
Lasha Guruli (GEO) | 3

Round of 16
Reese Lynch (GBR) | 0
Radoslav Rosenov (BUL) | 5
Viliam Tankó (SVK) | 0
Lasha Guruli (GEO) | 5

Quarterfinals
Radoslav Rosenov (BUL) | 0
Lasha Guruli (GEO) | 5

==== Section 4 ====
Round of 32
Alexandru Paraschiv (MDA) | 5
Sayed Kazemi (NOR) | 0
Abdallah Abou Arab (DEN) | 0
Aleksej Šendrik (SRB) | 5
Narek Hovhannisyan (ARM) | 3
Ahmad Shtiwi (ISR) | 2
Andriejus Lavrenovas (LTU) | 0
Richárd Kovács (HUN) | 5

Round of 16
Alexandru Paraschiv (MDA) | 2
Aleksej Šendrik (SRB) | 3
Narek Hovhannisyan (ARM) | 1
Richárd Kovács (HUN) | 4

Quarterfinals
Aleksej Šendrik (SRB) | 0
Richárd Kovács (HUN) | 5
