= Albania at the 2023 European Games =

- IOC code: ALB
- NOC: Albanian National Olympic Committee
- Website: nocalbania.org.al

in Kraków and Małopolska, Poland 21 June – 2 July 2023
- Competitors: 40 in 8 sports
- Flag bearer: Alvin Karaqi
- Medals Ranked 37th: Gold 2 Silver 0 Bronze 0 Total 2

European Games appearances (overview)
- 2015; 2019; 2023; 2027

Albania competed at the 2023 European Games, in Kraków and Małopolska, Poland, from 21 June to 2 July 2023.

== Medalists ==
Medal	Name	Sport	Event	Date
1st place, gold medalist(s)	Alvin Karaqi	Karate	Men's 84 kg	23 June
1st place, gold medalist(s)	Luiza Gega	Athletics	Women's 3000 metres steeplechase	25 June

== Competitors ==
Sport	Men	Women	Total
Athletics	14	15	29
Boxing	4	0	4
Fencing	1	0	1
Karate	1	0	1
Padel	2	0	2
Shooting	0	1	1
Taekwondo	1	0	1
Teqball	1	0	1
Total	24	16	40

== Athletics ==
Albania has competed in the third division of the 2023 European Athletics Team Championships which was held in Chorzów during the Games.

=== European Athletics Team Championships Third Division ===
Team	Event		Event points																			Total	Rank
Team	Event		100m	200m	400m	800m	1500m	5000m	110m h*	400m h	3000m SC	4 × 100 m	4 × 400 m**	SP	JT	HT	DT	PV	HJ	TJ	LJ	Total	Rank
Albania	Team Championships Third Division	Men	6	12	15	9	0	3	9	6	7	0	6	8	7	13	4	0	10	11	13	257	9
Albania	Team Championships Third Division	Women	8	5	9	8	11	15	10	9	15	11	6	0	0	0	0	0	6	6	5	257	9

key: h: hurdles; SC; Steeplechase: SP; Shot put: JT: Javelin: HT: Hammer: DT: Discus: PV: Pole vault: HJ: High jump: TJ: Triple Jump: LJ: Long Jump

- Women compete at 100 metre hurdles, rather than 110 metre hurdles.
- 4 x 400 metres is held as a single mixed sex event

=== Individual events at the 2023 European Games ===
As a participant in the Team event, each nation automatically enters one athlete in each of the individual events.

Event	Male Athlete	Score	Division ranking	Overall ranking	Female athlete	Score	Division ranking	Overall ranking
100 m	Julian Vila	11.21	10	42	Elisa Myrtollari	12.34	8	40
200 m	Franko Burraj	21.19	4	=24	Iljana Beqiri	25.70	8	43
400 m	Franko Burraj	46.30	1	19	Iljana Beqiri	57.60	7	37
800 m	Eraldo Qerama	1:54.19	7	38	Relaksa Dauti	2:15.21	8	38
1500 m	Bledar Mesi	Did Not Start			Redia Dauti	4:35.72	5	34
5000 m	Ilir Këllezi	17:22.79	13	44	Luiza Gega	15:32.39	1	5
110/100 m h	Milen Caco	15.48	7	38	Melisa Sina	15.09	6	36
400m h	Durjon Idrizaj	56.33	10	38	Uibi Ahmet	1:05.28	7	37
3000m SC	Bledar Mesi	10:36.99	9	40	Luiza Gega	9:17.31	1	1st place, gold medalist(s)
4 × 100 m	Franko Burraj; Muhamet Cangeli; Durjon Idrizaj; Julian Vila	Did Not Start			Joana Bitri; Alesia Dauti; Elisa Myrtollari; Paola Shyle	48.22	5	27
4 × 400 m (mixed)	—N/a				Zhuljeta Çejku; Stivi Kereku; Erkian Manci; Livja Topi	3:36.79	10	42
High jump	Milen Caco	1.75	6	38	Rexhina Berami	1.50	10	42
Pole vault	No athlete				No athlete			
Long Jump	Muhamet Cangeli	7.36	3	25	Figalia Gjati	4.95	11	42
Triple Jump	Muhamet Cangeli	15.15	5	24	Joana Goli	10.95	10	40
Shot put	Azgan Zeka	14.72	8	40	No athlete			
Discus	Admir Dizdari	38.79	12	43	No athlete			
Hammer	Dorian Çollaku	57.89	3	29	No athlete			
Javelin	Ingri Nelaj	48.56	9	40	No athlete			

== Boxing ==
Athlete	Event	Round of 32	Round of 16	Quarterfinal	Semifinal	Final	
Athlete	Event	Opposition Result	Opposition Result	Opposition Result	Opposition Result	Opposition Result	Rank
Ardit Murja	Men's featherweight	Vacula (MDA); W 3–2	Usturoi (BEL); L 0–5	Did Not Advance			9
Alban Beqiri	Men's light middleweight	Leburic (SLO); W 4–1	Trofimcuk (LTU); W 4–1	Terteryan (DEN); L 0–5	Did Not Advance		5
Redis Karaj	Men's light heavyweight	Cavallaro (ITA); L 0–5	Did Not Advance				17
Gelian Rojku	Men's heavyweight	Okafor (GER); L 0–5	Did Not Advance				17

== Fencing ==
Athlete	Event	Preliminaries	Round of 128	Round of 64	Round of 32	Round of 16	Quarterfinals	Semifinals	Final / BM	
Athlete	Event	V/B	Opposition Score	Opposition Score	Opposition Score	Opposition Score	Opposition Score	Opposition Score	Opposition Score	Rank
Massimo Mari	Men's épée	0/6	Did Not Advance							90

== Karate ==
Athlete	Event	Group Stage				Semifinals	Final	
Athlete	Event	Opposition Result	Opposition Result	Opposition Result	Rank	Opposition Result	Opposition Result	Rank
Alvin Karaqi	Men's kumite 84 kg	Garibović (CRO); W 2–0	Bąbos (POL); L 3–5	Mastrogiannis (GRE); W 1–0	2 Q	Martina (ITA); W 3–2	Timmermans (NED); W 3–2	1st place, gold medalist(s)

== Padel ==
Athlete	Event	Round of 32	Round of 16	Quarterfinals	Semifinals	Final / BM	
Athlete	Event	Opposition Score	Opposition Score	Opposition Score	Opposition Score	Opposition Score	Rank
Fjoralb Curri; Marco Montanaro	Men's Doubles	Neave/McKibbin (IRL); L 0–2	Did Not Advance				17

== Shooting ==
Athlete	Event	Precision Qualification		Rapid Qualification		Final	
Athlete	Event	Score	Rank	Score	Rank	Score	Rank
Manjola Konini	Women's 25m Pistol	271	35	554	35	Did Not Advance	

== Taekwondo ==
Athlete	Event	Round of 16	Quarterfinal	Semifinal/Repechage	Final/BM	
Athlete	Event	Opposition Score	Opposition Score	Opposition Score	Opposition Score	Rank
Juirdo Cani	Men's 63kg	Baretta (ITA); L 1–2	Did Not Advance	Uścimiuk (POL); W 2–1	Alaphilippe (FRA); L 0–2	9

== Teqball ==
Athlete	Event	Group stage			Quarterfinal	Semifinal	Final/BM	
Athlete	Event	Opposition Score	Opposition Score	Rank	Opposition Score	Opposition Score	Opposition Score	Rank
Fransua Shabani	Men's singles	Bubniak (CZE); L 0–2	Marojevic (SRB); L 0–2	3	Did Not Advance			
