= Andorra at the 2023 European Games =

- IOC code: AND
- NOC: Andorran Olympic Committee
- Website: www.coa.ad

in Kraków and Małopolska, Poland 21 June – 2 July 2023
- Competitors: 27 in 3 sports
- Flag bearer: TBD
- Medals: Gold 0 Silver 0 Bronze 0 Total 0

European Games appearances (overview)
- 2015; 2019; 2023; 2027

Andorra competed at the 2023 European Games, in Kraków and Małopolska, Poland, from 21 June to 2 July 2023.

== Competitors ==
| Sport | Men | Women | Total |
|---|---|---|---|
| Athletics | 12 | 12 | 24 |
| Canoe slalom | 0 | 2 | 2 |
| Taekwondo | 0 | 1 | 1 |
| Total | 12 | 15 | 27 |

== Athletics ==
Andorra has competed in the third division of the 2023 European Athletics Team Championships which was held in Chorzów during the Games.

=== European Athletics Team Championships Third Division ===
| Team | Event | | Event points | | | | | | | | | | | | | | | | | | | Total | Rank |
| Team | Event | | 100m | 200m | 400m | 800m | 1500m | 5000m | 110m h* | 400m h | 3000m SC | 4 × 100 m | 4 × 400 m** | SP | JT | HT | DT | PV | HJ | TJ | LJ | Total | Rank |
|---|---|---|---|---|---|---|---|---|---|---|---|---|---|---|---|---|---|---|---|---|---|---|---|
| Andorra | Team Championships Third Division | Men | 8 | 5 | 8 | 14 | 10 | 7 | 8 | 11 | 15 | 8 | 12 | 3 | 3 | 6 | 3 | 13 | 6 | 2 | 4 | 269 | 7 |
| Andorra | Team Championships Third Division | Women | 7 | 2 | 7 | 7 | 8 | 8 | 11 | 11 | 9 | 10 | 12 | 4 | 7 | 5 | 4 | 9 | 7 | 3 | 4 | 269 | 7 |

key: h: hurdles; SC; Steeplechase: SP; Shot put: JT: Javelin: HT: Hammer: DT: Discus: PV: Pole vault: HJ: High jump: TJ: Triple Jump: LJ: Long Jump

- Women compete at 100 metre hurdles, rather than 110 metre hurdles.
- 4 x 400 metres is held as a single mixed sex event

=== Individual events at the 2023 European Games ===
As a participant in the Team event, each nation automatically enters one athlete in each of the individual events.

| Event | Male Athlete | Score | Match points | Overall ranking | Female athlete | Score | Match points | Overall ranking |
|---|---|---|---|---|---|---|---|---|
| 100 m | Guillem Arderiu | 11.06 | 8 | 40 | Alba Viñals | 12.37 | 9 | 41 |
| 200 m | Guillem Arderiu | 22.39 | 11 | 42 | Bruna Luque | 26.68 | 14 | 46 |
| 400 m | Pau Blasi | 48.51 | 8 | 39 | Carlota Málaga Morán | 58.52 | 9 | =39 |
| 800 m | Pol Moya | 1:49.57 | 2 | 24 | Maria Martins Patricio | 2:17.14 | 9 | 39 |
| 1500 m | Carles Gómez | 3:48.41 | 6 | 30 | Aina Cinca Bons | 4:43.58 | 8 | 39 |
| 5000 m | Francesc Carmona | 15:40.37 | 9 | 40 | Xènia Mourelo | 18:29.67 | 8 | 40 |
| 110/100 m h | Pol Herreros | 15.70 | 8 | 39 | Alba Viñals | 14.68 | 5 | 34 |
| 400m h | Eloi Vilella | 55.63 | 5 | 33 | Duna Viñals | 1:00.22 | 5 | 26 |
| 3000m SC | Nahuel Carabaña | 8:48.79 | 1 | 16 | Xènia Mourelo | 11:19.40 | 7 | 36 |
| 4 × 100 m | Guillem Arderiu; Pau Blasi; Lander Teixeira; Miquel Vilchez | 42.84 | 8 | 34 | Carlota Málaga; Jana Rodriguez; Alba Viñals; Duna Viñals | 48.61 | 6 | 28 |
| 4 × 400 m (mixed) | —N/a | | | | Paul Blasi; Pol Moya; Alba Viñals; Duna Viñals | 3:29.54 | 4 | 34 |
| High jump | Nil Graells | 1.70 | 10 | 42 | Aroa Carballo | 1.55 | 9 | 41 |
| Pole vault | Miquel Vilchez | 4.75 | 3 | 28 | Ariadna Argemí | 2.50 | 7 | 35 |
| Long Jump | Miquel Vilchez | 5.63 | 12 | 42 | Jana Rodriguez | 4.83 | 12 | 43 |
| Triple Jump | Pol Herreros | 12.29 | 14 | 46 | Jana Rodriguez | 10.05 | 13 | 43 |
| Shot put | Oriol Cerdà | 10.17 | 13 | 45 | Maria Morató | 7.22 | 12 | 44 |
| Discus | Lander Teixeira | 24.36 | 13 | 44 | Dolça Fajardo | 23.84 | 12 | 44 |
| Hammer | Oriol Cerdà | 26.51 | 10 | 40 | Dolça Fajardo | 23.70 | 11 | 42 |
| Javelin | Lander Teixeira | 33.47 | 13 | 45 | Maria Morató | 29.60 | 9 | 41 |

== Canoe slalom ==
| Athlete | Event | Preliminary | | | | Quarterfinal | | Semifinal | | Final | |
| Athlete | Event | Run 1 | Rank | Run 2 | Rank | Time | Rank | Time | Rank | Time | Rank |
|---|---|---|---|---|---|---|---|---|---|---|---|
| Monica Doria Vilarrubla | Women's kayak | 98.79 | 13 Q | —N/a | | | | 104.94 | 11 | Did Not Advance | |
| Monica Doria Vilarrubla | Women's canoe | 107.41 | 11 Q | —N/a | | | | 110.23 | 2 Q | 158.03 | 10 |
| Monica Doria Vilarrubla | Women's kayak cross | 69.73 | 16 Q | —N/a | | FLT(2) | 3 | Did Not Advance | | | |
| Laura Pellicer Chica | Women's kayak | 114.32 | 34 | 121.12 | 18 | —N/a | | Did Not Advance | | | |
| Laura Pellicer Chica | Women's canoe | 116.67 | 26 | 117.19 | 11 | —N/a | | Did Not Advance | | | |
| Laura Pellicer Chica | Women's kayak cross | 73.89 | 30 | —N/a | | Did Not Advance | | | | | |

== Taekwondo ==
| Athlete | Event | Round of 16 | Quarterfinal | Semifinal | Final | |
| Athlete | Event | Opposition Score | Opposition Score | Opposition Score | Opposition Score | Rank |
|---|---|---|---|---|---|---|
| Naiara Linan Pardo | Women's -49 kg | Semberg (ISR); L 0–2 | Did Not Advance | | | 9 |
