= Taekwondo at the 2023 European Games – Women's 49 kg =

Taekwondo competition

Women's 49 kg at the 2023 European Games
- Venue: Krynica-Zdrój Arena
- Date: 23 June
- Competitors: 14 from 14 nations

Medalists
gold medal	Adriana Cerezo	Spain
silver medal	Merve Dinçel	Turkey
bronze medal	Maddison Moore	Great Britain
bronze medal	Supharada Kisskalt	Germany

The women's 49 kg competition in taekwondo at the 2023 European Games took place on 23 June at the Krynica-Zdrój Arena.

== Schedule ==
All times are Central European Summer Time (UTC+2).

Date	Time	Event
Friday, 23 June 2023	09:24	Round of 16
Friday, 23 June 2023	14:24	Quarterfinals
Friday, 23 June 2023	16:00	Semifinals
Friday, 23 June 2023	19:00	Bronze medal bouts
Friday, 23 June 2023	20:24	Final

== Results ==
Round of 16
Nikolet Kostova (BUL)	1	2
Virginia Maestro (ITA)	3	9
Avishag Semberg (ISR)	9	8
Naiara Liñán (AND)	2	2
Jenna Ylönen (FIN)	5	9	1
Nikola Krajewska (POL)	7	4	3
Bruna Duvančić (CRO)	12	13	27
Ada Avdagić (BIH)	14	1	28
Patimat Abakarova (AZE)	4	1
Supharada Kisskalt (GER)	7	10
Maddison Moore (GBR)	10	8
Maysane Kamkasoumphou (FRA)	3	7

Quarterfinals
Adriana Cerezo (ESP)	14	18
Virginia Maestro (ITA)	2	6
Avishag Semberg (ISR)	7	9
Nikola Krajewska (POL)	1	0
Ada Avdagić (BIH)	4	1
Supharada Kisskalt (GER)	6	3
Maddison Moore (GBR)	4	1
Merve Dinçel (TUR)	9	8

Semifinals
Adriana Cerezo (ESP)	7	15
Avishag Semberg (ISR)	4	1
Supharada Kisskalt (GER)	1	0
Merve Dinçel (TUR)	9	4

Final
Adriana Cerezo (ESP)	3	8	10
Merve Dinçel (TUR)	7	5	9

=== Repechage ===
Repechage

Bronze medal bout
Supharada Kisskalt (GER)	0	2	15
Virginia Maestro (ITA)	3	1	7
Maddison Moore (GBR)	4	11	11
Avishag Semberg (ISR)	6	6	10
