= Kosovo at the 2023 European Games =

- IOC code: KOS
- NOC: Olympic Committee of Kosovo
- Website: www.noc-kosovo.org

in Kraków and Małopolska, Poland 21 June – 2 July 2023
- Competitors: 38 in 8 sports
- Flag bearers: Donjeta Sadiku; Muhamet Ramadani
- Medals: Gold 0 Silver 0 Bronze 0 Total 0

European Games appearances (overview)
- 2015; 2019; 2023; 2027

Kosovo competed at the 2023 European Games, in Kraków and Małopolska, Poland, from 21 June to 2 July 2023.

== Competitors ==
As of 17 June 2023:

Sport	Men	Women	Total
Archery	1	0	1
Athletics	12	11	23
Boxing	6	1	7
Canoe slalom	1	1	2
Cycling	1	0	1
Shooting	1	0	1
Taekwondo	1	0	1
Teqball	2	0	2
Total	25	13	38

== Archery ==
Men

Recurve

Athlete	Event	Ranking round		Round of 64	Round of 32	Round of 16	Quarterfinals	Semifinals	Final / BM	
Athlete	Event	Score	Seed	Opposition Score	Opposition Score	Opposition Score	Opposition Score	Opposition Score	Opposition Score	Rank
Edi Dvorani	Individual	633	42	Habjan Malavašič (SLO); L 0–6	Did not advance					33

== Athletics ==
Kosovo is set to compete in the third division of the 2023 European Athletics Team Championships which is going to be held in Chorzów during the Games.

=== European Athletics Team Championships Third Division ===
Team	Event		Event points																			Total	Rank
Team	Event		100m	200m	400m	800m	1500m	5000m	110m h*	400m h	3000m SC	4x100m	4x400m**	SP	JT	HT	DT	PV	HJ	TJ	LJ	Total	Rank
Kosovo	Team Championships Third Division	Men	4	2	5	6	0	0	4	0	2	0	5	0	0	6	13	5	0	8	6	150	14
Kosovo	Team Championships Third Division	Women	11	7	3	11	4	4	11	3	4	0	5	0	0	2	7	6	0	5	6	150	14

key: h: hurdles; SC; Steeplechase: SP; Shot put: JT: Javelin: HT: Hammer: DT: Discus: PV: Pole vault: HJ: High jump: TJ: Triple Jump: LJ: Long Jump

- Women compete at 100 metre hurdles, rather than 110 metre hurdles.
- 4 x 400 metres is held as a single mixed sex event

=== Individual events at the 2023 European Games ===
As a participant in the Team event, each nation automatically enters one athlete in each of the individual events.

Event	Male Athlete	Score	Rank	Female athlete	Score	Rank
100 m	Leon Thaqi	4	12	Sara Susuri	11	5
200 m	Enis Bytyqi	2	14	Sara Susuri	7	9
400 m	Granit Ahmeti	5	11	Emine Jenuzi		
800 m	Astrit Kryeziu	6	10	Gresa Bakraçi		
1500 m	Astrit Kryeziu	0	0	Valentina Kelmendi-Musa		
5000 m	Albion Ymeri	0	0	Shala Ejona		
110/100 m h	No athlete			Donika Kryemadhi		
400m h	Florian Berisha	2	14	Florentine Restelica		
3000m SC	Genc Isufi	4	12	Gresa Bakraçi		
4x100 m	Granit Ahmeti; Florian Berisha; Enis Bytyqi; Olti Bytyqi; Astrit Kryeziu; Leon Thaqi	6	10	Emine Jenuzi; Vesa Jusufi; Medina Kutleshi; Lirije Peci; Florentina Restelica; Sara Susuri		
4x400 m (mixed)	—			Granit Ahmeti; Gresa Bakraçi; Enis Bytyqi; Emine Jenuzi; Astrit Kryeziu; Sara Susuri		
Shot put	Muhamet Ramadani	13	3	Arbesa Shala		
Javelin	Bardhyl Hajdaraj	8	8	Medina Kutleshi		
Hammer	No athlete			No athlete		
Discus	Alaudin Suma	5	11	Medina Kutleshi		
Pole vault	No athlete			No athlete		
High jump	Erudit Rysha	0	0	Donika Kryemadhi		
Triple Jump	Erudit Rysha	6	10	Lirije Peci		
Long Jump	Erudit Rysha	0	0	Lirije Peci		

== Boxing ==
Men

Athlete	Event	Round of 32	Round of 16	Quarterfinal	Semifinal	Final	
Athlete	Event	Opposition Result	Opposition Result	Opposition Result	Opposition Result	Opposition Result	Rank
Bashkim Bajoku	Men's -51 kg	Bye	Bennama (FRA); L 0-5	Did Not Advance			9
Shpetim Bajoku	Men's -63.5 kg	Komadina (CRO); W 4-1	Kanlı (TUR); L 2-3	Did Not Advance			9
Patriot Behrami	Men's -71 kg	Traoré (FRA); L 0-5	Did Not Advance				17
Altin Shala	Men's -80 kg	Ilyushonok (ISR); L KO	Did Not Advance				17
Taulant Jakupi	Men's -92 kg	Williams (GBR); L ABD	Did Not Advance				17
Shpejtim Shabani	Men's +92 kg	Bye	Jazevičius (LTU); L RSC	Did Not Advance			9

Women

Athlete	Event	Round of 32	Round of 16	Quarterfinal	Semifinal	Final	
Athlete	Event	Opposition Result	Opposition Result	Opposition Result	Opposition Result	Opposition Result	Rank
Donjeta Sadiku	Women's 60 kg	Whitwell (GBR); W 4-1	Jenni (SUI); W 4-1	Mossely (FRA); L 0-5	Did Not Advance		5

== Canoe Slalom ==
Men

Athlete	Event	Preliminary				Quarter-final		Semi-final		Final	
Athlete	Event	Run 1	Rank	Run 2	Rank	Time	Rank	Time	Rank	Time	Rank
Lorand Gjoshi	K-1	88.76	20 Q	—				155.78	40	Did not advance	

Women

Athlete	Event	Preliminary				Quarter-final		Semi-final		Final	
Athlete	Event	Run 1	Rank	Run 2	Rank	Time	Rank	Time	Rank	Time	Rank
Blandine Myriam Xhemajlji	K-1	143.34	41	142.17	22	—		Did not advance			

== Cycling ==
=== Mountain bike ===
Men

Athlete	Event	Time	Rank
Samir Hasani	Men's cross country	did not start	

== Shooting ==
Men

Athlete	Event	Qualification		Final	
Athlete	Event	Points	Rank	Points	Rank
Nexhat Sahiti	10 m air pistol	568	31	did not advance	

== Taekwondo ==
Kosovo qualified 1 athlete in Taekwondo at the games.

Men

Athlete	Event	Round of 16	Quarterfinal	Semi-final	Repechage	Final	
Athlete	Event	Opposition Result	Opposition Result	Opposition Result	Opposition Result	Opposition Result	Rank
Arber Bajra	-80 kg	Telikostoglou (GRE); L 0–2	Did not advance				11

== Teqball ==
Kosovo has qualified two Teqball players for the games.

Men

Team	Event	Group stage				Quarterfinal	Semifinal	Final / BM	
Team	Event	Opposition Score	Opposition Score	Opposition Score	Rank	Opposition Score	Opposition Score	Opposition Score	Rank
Krenar Emini	Men's singles								
Adrien Uka	Men's singles								
Krenar Emini; Adrien Uka	Men's doubles								
