= Ariel Atias (athlete) =

Israeli athlete (born 1999)

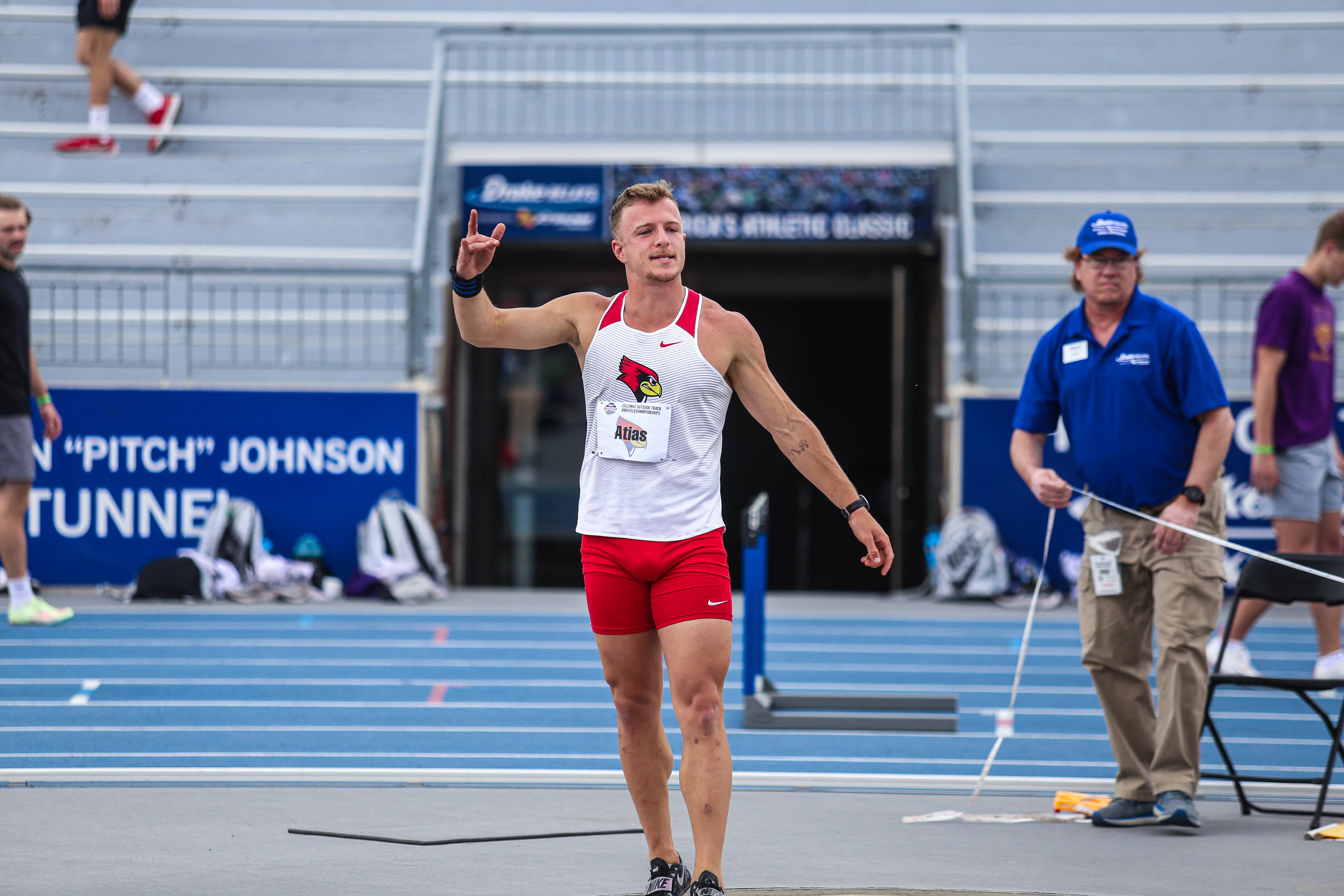

Personal information
- Native name: אריאל אטיאס
- Born: 9 May 1999 (age 27) Haifa, Israel
- Height: 5 ft 11 in (180 cm)

Sport
- Country: Israel
- Sport: Athletics
- Event: Decathlon

Achievements and titles
- Personal best: Stadium: Decathlon: 7343 points (2022)

Ariel Atias (Hebrew: אריאל אטיאס; born May 9, 1999) is an Israeli athlete, the winner of the Israeli championship two times in a row (2019 and 2020) in decathlon, as well as the Israeli national record holder in decathlon, with 7343 points.
