= Khayal Aliyev =

Azerbaijani Muay Thai fighter

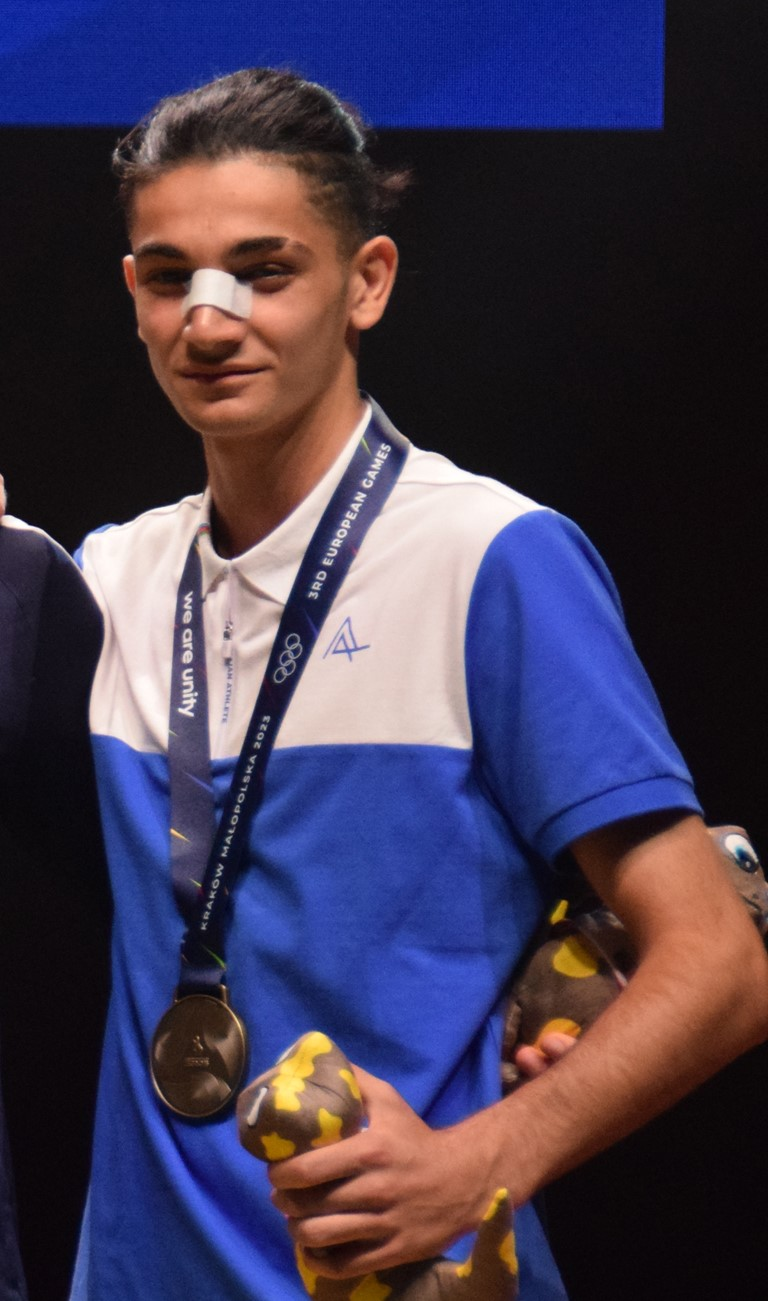
- Khayal Aliyev at the 2023 European Games awarding ceremony

Personal information
- Nationality: Azerbaijan
- Born: 15 March 2006 (age 20)

Sport
- Sport: Muay Thai
- Event: 67 kg
Medal record
Men's Muay Thai
Representing Azerbaijan
European Games
Bronze medal – third place	2023 Kraków-Małopolska	67 kg

Khayal Fakhri oglu Aliyev (Azerbaijani: Xəyal Fəxri oğlu Əliyev, born March 15, 2006) is an Azerbaijani Muay Thai fighter, 2022 World and European youths champion, bronze medalist of 2023 European Games.

== Biography ==
Khayal Fakhri oglu Aliyev was born on March 15, 2006. As a student of the 6th grade of secondary school No. 283 of the Binagadi district of Baku, he won first place in the tournament held by the European Muaythai Federation in the weight category up to 34 kg.

He became the winner of the Youth World Cups in 2016 and 2018, which were held in Turkey. In 2019, he won an international tournament in Iran.

In the end of 2019, Aliyev took third place at the World Youth Championships in Antalya, Turkey.

In February 2022, as a student of the 10th grade of secondary school No. 283, he won a gold medal at the European Youth Championship, which was held in Istanbul, Turkey. In August of the same year, Khayal Aliyev in the capital of Malaysia, Kuala Lumpur, became the world champion among youths in the weight category up to 60 kg.

In June 2023, he took part in the III European Games in Kraków. These Games were the first adult competition in Aliyev's career. In the quarterfinals of the weight category up to 67 kg, he won an early victory over Giorgiy Klein from Georgia, reaching the semifinals. Here he lost to local boxer Oscar Siegert, winning the bronze medal.
