= Maddison Moore =

British taekwondo practitioner (born 2003)

Personal information
- Nationality: British
- Born: 10 April 1995 (age 31)

Sport
- Country: United Kingdom
- Sport: Taekwondo
- Event: 49 kg
Medal record
Women's taekwondo
Representing Great Britain
European Games
Bronze medal – third place	2023 Kraków-Małopolska	49kg
- Updated on 26 June 2023

Maddison Moore (born 10 April 1995) is a British martial arts practitioner. A former junior and senior Karate champion, she won bronze in Taekwondo at the 2023 European Games in the Women's 49 kg category.

== Career ==
=== Karate ===
From Blakedown, near Kidderminster, Moore began Karate aged seven and was coached by her father Bradley. She became a European and World junior Karate champion, winning the World Union Karate-do Federation World Champion in the 15-17 category in 2012 and then winning the European title in London the following year. After attending De Montfort University to study performing arts, she became the British University Champion and in 2015 won the world senior Kumite -55 kg belt in Slovenia.

=== Taekwondo ===
Moore joined the British Taekwondo programme in 2017. Moore won her first Taekwondo medal when she won silver at the Polish Open in 2018. In May 2018 she represented Britain at the 2018 European Taekwondo Championships held in Kazan, Russia. Moore won her first international title at the 2019 Austrian Open. She would later win a European bronze medal in the 49 kg event in Sarajevo, Bosnia in December 2020, which included a 32-30, golden point victory over 2016 European champion Iryna Romoldanova of Ukraine. Moore competed for Britain at the 2023 European Games and won the bronze medal in the Women's 49 kg category, defeating Israel's Avishag Semberg 2-1 in the third-placed bout.
