= North Macedonia at the 2023 European Games =

- IOC code: MKD
- NOC: Olympic Committee of North Macedonia
- Website: www.european-games.org

in Kraków, Poland 21 June – 2 July
- Competitors: 38 in 9 sports
- Flag bearers: Milijana Ristikj & Emil Pavlov (karate)
- Medals Ranked 39th: Gold 0 Silver 1 Bronze 0 Total 1

European Games appearances (overview)
- 2015; 2019; 2023; 2027

North Macedonia competed at the 2023 European Games in Kraków from 21 June to 2 July 2023. North Macedonia was represented by 38 athletes in 9 sports.

== Medalists ==
Medal	Name	Sport	Event	Date	Reference
Silver	Dejan Georgievski	Taekwondo	Men's +87kg	26 June	
