= Igor Liubchenko =

Ukrainian Muay Thai fighter (born 1991)

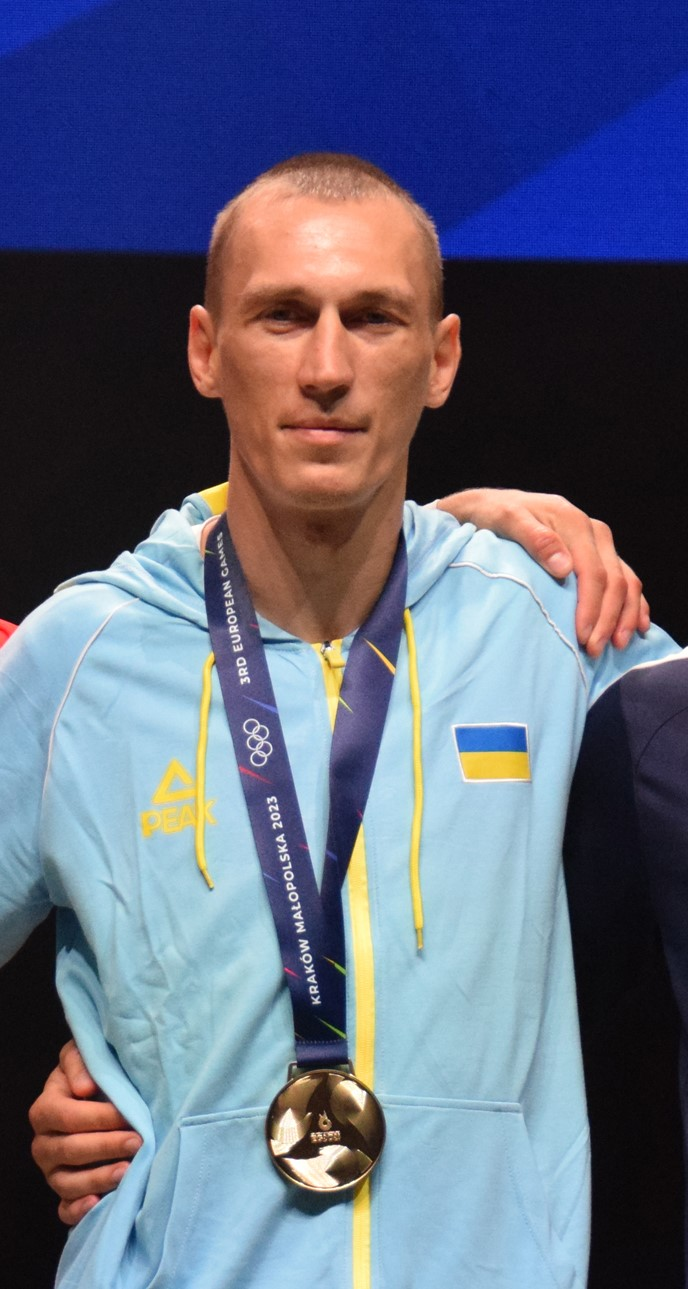
- Born: March 16, 1991 (age 35); Ukrainian SSR, Soviet Union
- Nationality: Ukrainian
- Height: 185 cm (6 ft 1 in)
- Weight: 65 kg (143 lb; 10.2 st)
- Style: Muay Thai
- Fighting out of: Odesa, Ukraine
- Team: Captain Muay Thai

Igor Liubchenko
Medal record

Men's Muay Thai

Representing Ukraine

World Games
| Gold medal – first place | 2017 Wrocław | 63.5 kg |
| Gold medal – first place | 2022 Birmingham | 63.5 kg |

IFMA World Championships
| Gold medal – first place | 2014 Langkawi | 63.5 kg |
| Gold medal – first place | 2015 Bangkok | 63.5 kg |
| Gold medal – first place | 2016 Jönköping | 63.5 kg |
| Gold medal – first place | 2018 Cancún | 63.5 kg |
| Gold medal – first place | 2019 Bangkok | 63.5 kg |
| Silver medal – second place | 2011 Tashkent | 60 kg |
| Silver medal – second place | 2012 Saint Petersburg | 63.5 kg |
| Bronze medal – third place | 2009 Bangkok | 57 kg |
| Bronze medal – third place | 2017 Minsk | 63.5 kg |
| Bronze medal – third place | 2024 Patras | 67 kg |

European Games
| Gold medal – first place | 2023 Myślenice | 67 kg |

European Muaythai Championships
| Gold medal – first place | 2010 Velletri | 57 kg |
| Silver medal – second place | 2011 Antalya | 60 kg |
| Silver medal – second place | 2012 Antalya | 63.5 kg |
| Silver medal – second place | 2014 Kraków | 63.5 kg |
| Bronze medal – third place | 2008 Zgorzelec | 57 kg |
| Bronze medal – third place | 2022 Istanbul | 67 kg |

Igor Liubchenko (born March 16, 1991) is a Ukrainian Muay Thai fighter. He is one of the most successful amateur Muay Thai athletes of all time.

== Biography and career ==
Liubchenko started Muay Thai training at the age of 12, he holds a Master of Sports of Ukraine in Thai boxing.

Igor Liubchenko faced Hiroya at MAX Muay Thai 5: The Final Chapter in Khon Kaen, Thailand on December 10, 2013. He was defeated by second round knockout via high kick.

On April 28, 2017, Liubchenko took part in the EM Legend Kickboxing World Tournament in the 63 kg division. He defeated Meng Kang from China by technical knockout in the semi-final and was defeated by knockout in the final against Anvar Boynazarov.

On September 30, 2017, Liubchenko faced Pakorn P.K. Saenchai Muaythaigym at All-Star Fight 2. He lost the fight by decision.

On May 6, 2018, Liubchenko entered the 8-man Real Hero tournament in Bangkok, Thailand. He defeated three opponents in one night all by knockout to capture the tournament title.

On March 9, 2019, Liubchenko faced Superbank Mor Ratanabandit at All Star Fight: World Soldier. He lost the fight by decision.

On October 16, 2021, Liubchenko travelled to Hungary to face Spéth Norbert. He lost the fight by decision after three rounds.

== Titles and accomplishments ==
=== Professional ===
- 2015 WMC King's Birthday Tournament Runner-up
- 2018 Real Hero Muay Thai 63 kg Tournament Winner

=== Amateur ===
- International Federation of Muaythai Associations
  - 2008 IFMA European Championships −57 kg (gold)
  - 2009 IFMA World Championships −57 kg (bronze)
  - 2010 IFMA European Championships −57 kg (gold)
  - 2011 IFMA World Championships −60 kg (silver)
  - 2011 IFMA European Championships −60 kg (silver)
  - 2012 IFMA European Championships −63.5 kg (silver)
  - 2012 IFMA World Championships −63.5 kg (silver)
  - 2014 IFMA World Championships −63.5 kg (gold)
  - 2014 IFMA European Championships −63.5 kg (silver)
  - 2015 IFMA World Championships −63.5 kg (gold)
  - 2016 IFMA World Championships −63.5 kg (gold)
  - 2017 IFMA World Championships −63.5 kg (bronze)
  - 2018 IFMA World Championships −63.5 kg (gold)
  - 2019 IFMA World Championships −63.5 kg (gold)
  - 2022 IFMA European Championships −67 kg (bronze)
  - 2024 IFMA World Championships −67 kg (bronze)
- World Games
  - 2010 World Games Muay Thai −57 kg (gold)
  - 2013 World Games Muay Thai −63.5 kg (gold)
  - 2017 World Games Muay Thai −63.5 kg (gold)
  - 2022 World Games Muay Thai −63.5 kg (gold)
- European Games
  - 2023 European Games Muay Thai −67 kg (gold)
- Arafura Games
  - 2019 Arafura Games Muay Thai −63.5 kg (gold)

=== Awards ===
- 2015 National Olympic Committee of Ukraine Triumph of the Year

== Fight record ==
Professional Muay Thai record
30 Wins, 7 Losses
| Date | Result | Opponent | Event | Location | Method | Round | Time |
| 2021-10-16 | Loss | (Hungary) Spéth Norbert | Superfight Series | Székesfehérvár, Hungary | Decision | 3 | 3:00 |
| 2019-03-09 | Loss | (Thailand) Superbank Mor Ratanabandit | All Star Fight | Bangkok, Thailand | Decision | 5 | 3:00 |
| 2018-12-01 | Win | (China) Wang Zhiwei | Wu Lin Feng −67kg World Cup 2018–2019 Group D | Zhengzhou, China | Decision | 3 | 3:00 |
| 2018-05-06 | Win | (Thailand) Jarwdjew Singnakonkui | Real Hero Tournament, Final | Bangkok, Thailand | KO | | |
Wins Real Hero Muay Thai lightweight Tournament title.
| 2018-05-06 | Win | (Mongolia) Batjargal Sundui | Real Hero Tournament, Semi-finals | Bangkok, Thailand | KO | | |
| 2018-05-06 | Win | (Thailand) Limpetch CourageFightTeam | Real Hero Tournament, Quarter Finals | Bangkok, Thailand | KO | | |
| 2017-09-30 | Loss | (Thailand) Pakorn P.K. Saenchai Muaythaigym | All-Star Fight 2 | Bangkok, Thailand | Decision | 3 | 3:00 |
| 2017-04-28 | Loss | (Uzbekistan) Anvar Boynazarov | EM Legend, 18 Tournament Final | Chengdu, China | TKO (Punches) | 2 | 0:40 |
For the EM Legend World −65kg Tournament title.
| 2017-04-28 | Win | (China) Meng Kang | EM Legend, 18 Tournament Semi-final | Chengdu, China | TKO | | |
| 2017-04-03 | Win | (Thailand) | SUPER MUAY THAI | Bangkok, Thailand | TKO | 2 | |
| 2016-12-03 | Win | (Thailand) Lakhin | SUPER MUAY THAI | Bangkok, Thailand | Decision | 3 | 3:00 |
| 2016-10-28 | Win | (China) | Wu Fight | China | Decision | 3 | 3:00 |
| 2016-08-28 | Win | (Thailand) Monsiam | SUPER MUAY THAI | Bangkok, Thailand | Decision | 3 | 3:00 |
| 2015-12-12 | Loss | (Thailand) Petchtanong Banchamek | SUPER MUAYTHAI | Bangkok, Thailand | Decision (Unanimous) | 3 | 3:00 |
For the IPCC Muay Thai World −67kg title.
| 2015-12-05 | Loss | (Thailand) Fahmai Ansukhumvit | King's Birthday – WMC 16-man Tournament, Final | Bangkok, Thailand | Decision | 1 | 3:00 |
| 2015-12-05 | Win | (Belarus) Pavel Delenic | King's Birthday – WMC 16-man Tournament, Semi-final | Bangkok, Thailand | Decision | 1 | 3:00 |
| 2015-12-05 | Win | (Sweden) Samuel Bark | King's Birthday – WMC 16-man Tournament, Quarter Final | Bangkok, Thailand | Decision | 1 | 3:00 |
| 2015-12-05 | Win | (Thailand) Thepabutr Dadpong | King's Birthday – WMC 16-man Tournament, First Round | Bangkok, Thailand | Decision | 1 | 3:00 |
| 2015-01-31 | Loss | (China) Deng Zeqi | Wu Lin Feng | China | TKO (Left Hook) | | |
| 2014-09-13 | Win | (Thailand) Yokpetch Petchkasem | Topking World Series | Minsk, Belarus | KO | 3 | |
| 2013-12-10 | Loss | (Japan) Hiroya | MAX Muay Thai 5: The Final Chapter | Khon Kaen, Thailand | KO (High kick) | 2 | |
| 2013-09-28 | Win | (Moldova) Vitalie Matei | KOK World GP 2013 | Chișinău, Moldova | Decision | 3 | 3:00 |
| 2011-07-02 | Win | (Austria) Sasa Jovanovic | X3 League | Austria | Decision | 3 | 3:00 |
| 2009-12-09 | Win | (Thailand) Ponchai Sorruengsawat | | Ko Samui, Thailand | KO (Uppercut) | 1 | |
| 2009-05-09 | Win | (Ukraine) Roman Mailov | | Ivano-Frankivsk, Ukraine | Decision | 3 | 3:00 |
Legend: Win Loss Draw/No contest Notes

Amateur Muay Thai record
| Date | Result | Opponent | Event | Location | Method | Round | Time |
|---|---|---|---|---|---|---|---|
| 2024-06-07 | Loss | (United Arab Emirates) Mohammed Mardi | IFMA 2024 World Championships, Semifinals | Patras, Greece | Decision (29:28) | 3 | 3:00 |
Wins 2024 IFMA World Championships −67 kg Bronze Medal.
| 2024-06-06 | Win | (Morocco) Rachid Hamza | IFMA 2024 World Championships, Quarterfinals | Patras, Greece | Decision (30:27) | 3 | 3:00 |
| 2024-06-04 | Win | (Italy) Francesco Franzosi | IFMA 2024 World Championships, Second Round | Patras, Greece | Decision (30:27) | 3 | 3:00 |
| 2024-06-01 | Win | (Turkey) Sakir Bakirov | IFMA 2024 World Championships, First Round | Patras, Greece | Decision (30:27) | 3 | 3:00 |
| 2023-06-27 | Win | (Poland) Oskar Siegert | IFMA at the 2023 European Games, Final | Kraków, Poland | Decision (29:28) | 3 | 3:00 |
Wins 2023 European Games −67 kg Gold Medal.
| 2023-06-26 | Win | (Sweden) Sven Linus Bylander | IFMA at the 2023 European Games, Semifinal | Kraków, Poland | Decision (30:27) | 3 | 3:00 |
| 2023-06-25 | Win | (Greece) Dimos Asimakopoulos | IFMA at the 2023 European Games, Quarterfinal | Kraków, Poland | RSCS | 3 | |
| 2022-07-17 | Win | (Thailand) Weerasak Tharakhajad | IFMA at the 2022 World Games, Final | Birmingham, Alabama, US | Decision (29:29) | 3 | 3:00 |
Wins 2022 World Games −63.5 kg Gold Medal.
| 2022-07-16 | Win | (United States) Joseph Mueller | IFMA at the 2022 World Games, Semi-finals | Birmingham, Alabama, US | Decision (30:27) | 3 | 3:00 |
| 2022-07-15 | Win | (Kazakhstan) Abil Galiyev | IFMA at the 2022 World Games, Quarter Finals | Birmingham, Alabama, US | Decision (30:26) | 3 | 3:00 |
| 2022-02-19 | Loss | (Belarus) Dmitry Varats | 2022 IFMA European Championships, Semi-final | Istanbul, Turkey | TKO | 3 | |
Wins 2022 IFMA European Championships −63.5 kg Bronze Medal.
| 2021-12-11 | Loss | (Thailand) Weerasak Tharakhajad | 2021 IFMA World Championships, Final | Bangkok, Thailand | Decision (29:28) | 3 | |
Wins 2021 IFMA World Championships −63.5 kg Silver Medal.
| 2021-12-10 | Win | (Kazakhstan) Abil Galiyev | 2021 IFMA World Championships, Semi-finals | Bangkok, Thailand | Decision (30:27) | 3 | |
| 2021-12-09 | Win | (Sweden) Linus Bylander | 2021 IFMA World Championships, Quarter Finals | Bangkok, Thailand | Decision (30:27) | 3 | |
| 2021-12-08 | Win | (Mexico) Jose Luis Saenz | 2021 IFMA World Championships, Round 2 | Bangkok, Thailand | TKO | 2 | |
| 2019-07-28 | Win | (Russia) Abdulmalik Mugidinov | 2019 IFMA World Championships, Final | Bangkok, Thailand | Decision (29–28) | 3 | 3:00 |
Wins 2019 IFMA World Championships −63.5 kg Gold Medal.
| 2019-07-26 | Win | (Thailand) Kittiphop Mueangprom | 2019 IFMA World Championships, Semi-final | Bangkok, Thailand | Decision (29–28) | 3 | 3:00 |
| 2019-07-25 | Win | (Turkey) Serdar Koc | 2019 IFMA World Championships, Quarter Final | Bangkok, Thailand | TKO | 2 | |
| 2019-07-24 | Win | (Slovakia) Lukáš Mandinec | 2019 IFMA World Championships, Second Round | Bangkok, Thailand | TKO | 1 | |
| 2019-05-01 | Win | (France) Lorenzo Sammartino | 2019 Arafura Games, Final | Bangkok, Thailand | TKO | 3 | |
Wins 2019 Arafura Games −63.5 kg Gold Medal.
| 2019-04-30 | Win | (Taipei) Sung-Sen Huang | 2019 Arafura Games, Semi-finals | Bangkok, Thailand | TKO | 1 | |
| 2019-04-29 | Win | (Philippines) Ryan Jakiri | 2019 Arafura Games, Quarter Finals | Bangkok, Thailand | TKO | 2 | |
| 2019-03-16 | Win | (Ukraine) Vladyslav Yarmak | 2019 Ukraine Kickboxing Championship, Final | Odesa, Ukraine | Decision | 3 | 3:00 |
Wins 2019 Ukraine WAKO Kickboxing −67kg title.
| 2018-05-19 | Win | (Russia) Abdulmalik Mugidinov | 2018 IFMA World Championships, Final | Cancún, Mexico | Decision (30:27) | 3 | 3:00 |
Wins 2018 IFMA World Championships −63.5 kg Gold Medal.
| 2018-05-16 | Win | (Sweden) Mathias Jonsson | 2018 IFMA World Championships, Semi-final | Cancún, Mexico | Decision (30:26) | 3 | 3:00 |
| 2018-05-14 | Win | (Brazil) Carlos Henrique Klimacheski | 2018 IFMA World Championships, Quarter Final | Cancún, Mexico | TKO | 2 | |
| 2018-05-12 | Win | (Kazakhstan) Abil Galiyev | 2018 IFMA World Championships, Second Round | Cancún, Mexico | TKO | 1 | |
| 2017-07-30 | Win | (Iran) Ali Zarinfar | 2017 World Games, Final | Wroclaw, Poland | Decision (30–27) | 3 | 3:00 |
Wins 2017 World Games −63.5 kg Gold Medal.
| 2017-07-29 | Win | (Lebanon) Ahmad Ondash | 2017 World Games, Semi-final | Wroclaw, Poland | TKO | | |
| 2017-07-28 | Win | (Kazakhstan) Abil Galiyev | 2017 World Games, Quarter Final | Wroclaw, Poland | TKO | | |
| 2017-05-10 | Loss | (Belarus) Artem Avanesov | 2017 IFMA World Championships, Semi-finals | Minsk, Belarus | Decision (29:28) | 3 | 3:00 |
Wins 2017 IFMA World Championship −63.5 kg Bronze Medal.
| 2017-05-07 | Win | (Poland) Oskar Siegert | 2017 IFMA World Championships, Quarter Finals | Minsk, Belarus | TKO | 3 | |
| 2017-05-05 | Win | (Sweden) Nasim Kazem | 2017 IFMA World Championships, 1/8 Finals | Minsk, Belarus | TKO | 2 | |
| 2016-11-26 | Win | (Russia) Pavel Valteran | IFMA World Cup 2016 in Kazan, Final | Kazan, Russia | Decision | 3 | |
Wins the 2016 IFMA World Cup in Kazan −63.5 kg Gold Medal.
| 2016-11-24 | Win | (Ivory Coast) Youssouf Binate | IFMA World Cup 2016 in Kazan, Semi-final | Kazan, Russia | Decision | 3 | |
| 2016-05-28 | Win | (Russia) Vladimir Kuzmin | 2016 IFMA World Championships, Final | Jönköping, Sweden | Decision (30:27) | 3 | 3:00 |
Wins 2016 IFMA World Championship −63.5 kg Gold Medal.
| 2016-05-26 | Win | (Georgia (country)) Bakaar Gelenidze | 2016 IFMA World Championships, Semi-finals | Jönköping, Sweden | TKO | 1 | |
| 2016-05-24 | Win | (Philippines) Jonathan Polosan | 2016 IFMA World Championships, Quarter Finals | Jönköping, Sweden | Decision (30:27) | 3 | 3:00 |
| 2016-02-07 | Win | (Ukraine) Dmitry Godlevsky | 2016 Ukraine Muay Thai Championship, Final | Odesa, Ukraine | Decision | 3 | 3:00 |
Wins 2016 Ukraine IFMA Muay Thai −63.5 kg title.
| 2015-08- | Win | (Israel) Itay Guyer | 2015 IFMA World Championships, Final | Bangkok, Thailand | Decision | 3 | 3:00 |
Wins 2015 IFMA World Championship −63.5 kg Gold Medal.
| 2015-08- | Win | (Thailand) Kaeosikhao Kriangkai | 2015 IFMA World Championships, Semi-final | Bangkok, Thailand | Decision | 3 | 3:00 |
| 2015-08- | Win | (Belarus) Dzmitry Filipau | 2015 IFMA World Championships, Quarter Final | Bangkok, Thailand | TKO | | |
| 2015-08- | Win | (Belgium) Geerts Dries | 2015 IFMA World Championships, Quarter Final | Bangkok, Thailand | TKO | 3 | |
| 2015-07- | Win | (Ukraine) Andrey Perzhanovsky | 2015 Ukraine Muay Thai Championship, Final | Ukraine | TKO | 2 | |
Wins 2015 Ukraine IFMA Muay Thai −63.5 kg title.
| 2014-09- | Loss | (Belarus) Dmitry Varats | 2014 IFMA European Championships, Final | Kraków, Poland | Decision | 3 | 3:00 |
Wins 2014 IFMA European Championship −63.5 kg Silver Medal.
| 2014-09- | Win | (Israel) Itay Gayer | 2014 IFMA European Championships, Semi-finals | Kraków, Poland | Decision | 3 | 3:00 |
| 2014-09- | Win | (Russia) Andrey Khromov | 2014 IFMA European Championships, Quarter Finals | Kraków, Poland | Decision | 3 | 3:00 |
| 2014-05- | Win | (Belarus) Dmitry Varats | 2014 IFMA World Championships, Final | Langkawi, Malaysia | Decision | 3 | 3:00 |
Wins 2014 IFMA World Championship −63.5 kg Gold Medal.
| 2014-05- | Win | (Philippines) Jonathan Polosan | 2014 IFMA World Championships, Semi-finals | Langkawi, Malaysia | Decision | 3 | 3:00 |
| 2014-05- | Win | (Uzbekistan) Boburjon Tagayev | 2014 IFMA World Championships, Quarter Finals | Langkawi, Malaysia | Decision | 3 | 3:00 |
| 2014-05- | Win | (Thailand) Suranto Virayo | 2014 IFMA World Championships, First Round | Langkawi, Malaysia | Decision | 3 | 3:00 |
| 2013-10-23 | Win | (Thailand) Manop Srirupi | 2013 World Combat Games, Final | Bangkok, Thailand | Decision | 3 | 3:00 |
Wins 2013 World Combat Games Muay Thai −63.5 kg Gold Medal.
| 2013-10-21 | Win | (Belarus) Dmitry Varats | 2013 World Combat Games, Semi-final | Bangkok, Thailand | Decision | 3 | 3:00 |
| 2013-07-24 | Loss | (Belarus) Dmitry Varats | 2013 IFMA European Championship | Lisbon, Portugal | Decision | 3 | 3:00 |
| 2012-09-13 | Loss | (Thailand) Klumya Akephon | 2012 IFMA World Championships, Final | Saint Petersburg, Russia | Decision | 3 | 2:00 |
Wins 2012 IFMA World Championships −63.5 kg Silver Medal.
| 2012-09-11 | Win | (Canada) Hakeem Dawodu | 2012 IFMA World Championships 2012, Semi-finals | Saint Petersburg, Russia | Decision (Split) | 3 | 3:00 |
| 2012-09-10 | Win | (Uzbekistan) Firdavsiy Kholmuratov | 2012 IFMA World Championships, Quarter Finals | Saint Petersburg, Russia | | | |
| 2012-09-08 | Win | (Spain) Jose Maria Quevedo Tapia | 2012 IFMA World Championships, First Round | Saint Petersburg, Russia | | | |
| 2012-04- | Loss | (Belarus) Dmitry Varats | 2012 IFMA European Championships 2012, Final | Antalya, Turkey | Decision | 3 | 3:00 |
Wins 2012 IFMA European Championships −63.5 kg Silver Medal.
| 2012-04- | Win | (Russia) Garik Kalashyan | 2012 IFMA European Championships 2012, Semi-finals | Antalya, Turkey | Decision | 3 | 3:00 |
| 2012-04- | Win | (Romania) Cristian Spetcu | 2012 IFMA European Championships 2012 | Antalya, Turkey | Decision | 3 | 3:00 |
| 2012-01-29 | Win | (Ukraine) Nikolay Kyrylov | 2012 Ukraine Muay Thai Championship, Final | Odesa, Ukraine | TKO | 1 | |
Wins 2012 Ukraine IFMA Muay Thai 63.5 kg title.
| 2011-09-27 | Loss | (Thailand) Wuttichai Meechan | 2011 IFMA World Championships, Final | Tashkent, Uzbekistan | Decision | 3 | 3:00 |
Wins 2011 IFMA World Championships −81kg Silver Medal.
| 2011-09-25 | Win | (Uzbekistan) Abdul Khudoyberdiev | 2011 IFMA World Championships 2011, Semi-finals | Tashkent, Uzbekistan | TKO | 3 | |
| 2011-09-23 | Win | (Iran) Masoud Abdolmalek | 2011 IFMA World Championships 2011, Quarter Finals | Tashkent, Uzbekistan | Decision | 3 | 3:00 |
| 2011-04- | Loss | (Belarus) Dmitry Varats | 2011 IFMA European Championships, Final | Antalya, Turkey | Decision | 4 | 2:00 |
Wins 2011 IFMA European Championships −60kg Silver Medal.
| 2011-04- | Win | (Spain) Penafel Volotan | 2011 IFMA European Championships, Semi-finals | Antalya, Turkey | Decision | 4 | 2:00 |
| 2011-02-07 | Win | (Ukraine) Mikhail Vasilioglo | 2011 Ukraine Muay Thai Championship, Final | Ukraine | Decision | | |
Wins 2011 Ukraine IFMA Muay Thai 60kg title.
| 2010-12- | Loss | (Belarus) Dmitry Varats | 2010 I.F.M.A. World Muaythai Championships, Quarter Finals | Bangkok, Thailand | Decision | 4 | 2:00 |
| 2010-12- | Win | (Uzbekistan) Hudoybarbiev | 2010 I.F.M.A. World Muaythai Championships | Bangkok, Thailand | Decision | 4 | 2:00 |
| 2010-09- | Win | (Thailand) Witsanu Chankhunthod | 2010 World Combat Games, Final | Beijing, China | Decision | | |
Wins 2010 World Combat Games Muay Thai −57kg Gold Medal.
| 2010-09- | Win | (China) Wang Kang | 2010 World Combat Games, Semi-finals | Beijing, China | Decision | | |
| 2010-09- | Win | (China) Wong Siu Hang | 2010 World Combat Games, Quarter Finals | Beijing, China | KO | 2 | |
| 2010-05- | Win | (Turkey) Murat Antepli | 2010 IFMA European Championship, Final | Rome, Italy | TKO | 3 | |
Wins 2010 IFMA European Championship −57kg Gold Medal.
| 2010-05- | Win | (Russia) Konstantin Nechaev | 2010 IFMA European Championship | Rome, Italy | Decision | 4 | 2:00 |
| 2010-12- | Loss | (Thailand) Witsanu Chankhutkhon | 2009 IFMA World Championships, Quarter Finals | Bangkok, Thailand | Decision | 4 | 2:00 |
| 2010-11- | Win | (Azerbaijan) Tural Shafiev | 2009 IFMA World Championships, 1/8 Finals | Bangkok, Thailand | TKO | 2 | |
Legend: Win Loss Draw/No contest Notes
