= Bediha Tacyıldız =

Turkish Muay Thai practitioner (born 1996)

- Born: 12 July 1996 (age 29); Sivas, Turkey
- Nationality: Turkish
- Division: Muaythai: 63.5 kg (formerly: 67 kg); Kickboxing: 65 kg
- Style: Muay Thai & Kickboxing

Bediha Tacyıldız
Medal record

Representing Turkey

Women's Muay Thai

IFMA World Championships
Silver medal – second place	2024 Patras	63.5 kg
Silver medal – second place	2023 Bangkok	63.5 kg
Gold medal – first place	2022 Abu Dhabi	63.5 kg
Gold medal – first place	2021 Bangkok	67 kg
Gold medal – first place	2019 Bangkok	67 kg
Bronze medal – third place	2018 Cancún	67 kg
Gold medal – first place	2017 Minsk	67 kg
Silver medal – second place	2016 Jönköping	67 kg
Gold medal – first place	2014 Langkawi	67 kg

European Games
Gold medal – first place	2023 Myślenice	63.5 kg

European Muaythai Championships
Gold medal – first place	2019 Minsk	67 kg
Silver medal – second place	2018 Prague	67 kg
Silver medal – second place	2017 Paris	67 kg
Gold medal – first place	2014 Kraków	67 kg
Gold medal – first place	2012 Antalya	67 kg

FISU World University Championship
Gold medal – first place	2018 Pattaya	67 kg

Women's Kickboxing }

Islamic Solidarity Games
Gold medal – first place	2021 Konya	-65 kg

Bediha Tacyıldız (born 12 July 1996) is a Turkish Muay Thai practitioner competing in the 63.5 kg division, and kickboxer in the 65 kg. She is multiple times world, European and European Games champion in Muaythai, and Islamic Solidarity Games champion in kickboxing.

== Sport career ==
=== Mıay Thai ===
At the 2022 IFMA World Muaythai Championships held in Abu Dhabi, United Arab Emirates, Tacyıldız captured the gold medal in the Elite Senior 63 kg event.

She won the silver medal in the 63.5 kg division at the 2023 FIMA Senior World Championships held in Bangkok, Thailand.

She took the silver medal in the Elite Senior 63.5 kg event at the 2024 IFMA World Muaythai Championships in Patras, Greece.

== Personal life ==
Bediha Tacyıldız was born in Sivas, Turkey, on 12 July 1996. She is a graduate of Physical Education from Düzce University
