= IFMA World Muaythai Championships =

World championships for Muay Thai

Competition details
- Discipline: Muay Thai
- Type: Muay Thai and Muay Boran
- Organiser: International Federation of Muaythai Associations (IFMA)

History
- First edition: 1999 in Bangkok, Thailand
- Editions: 17 (2018)
- Final edition: 2018 in Cancún, Mexico

The IFMA World Muaythai Championships are annual Muay Thai competitions organised by the International Federation of Muaythai Associations (IFMA). Alongside the World Games, it is the highest level of world competition for Muay Thai.

== Individual events ==
Event	WCH				WYCH							
Event	Elite		U23		U17		U15		U13		U11	
Event	M	W	M	W	B	G	B	G	B	G	B	G
−30 kg											•	•
−32 kg									•	•	•	•
−34 kg									•	•	•	•
−36 kg								•	•	•	•	•
−38 kg							•	•	•	•	•	•
−40 kg							•	•	•	•	•	•
−42 kg						•	•	•	•	•	•	•
−44 kg									•	•	•	•
−45 kg (Pinweight)		•		•	•	•	•	•				
−46 kg									•	•	•	•
−48 kg (Light flyweight)	•	•	•	•	•	•	•	•	•	•	•	•
−50 kg									•	•	•	•
−51 kg (Flyweight)	•	•	•	•	•	•	•	•				
−52 kg									•	•	•	•
−54 kg (Bantamweight)	•	•	•	•	•	•	•	•	•	•	•	•
−56 kg									•	•	•	•
−57 kg (Featherweight)	•	•	•	•	•	•	•	•				
−58 kg									•	•	•	•
−60 kg (Lightweight)	•	•	•	•	•	•	•	•	•	•	•	•
+60 kg												•
−63.5 kg (Light welterweight)	•	•	•	•	•	•	•	•	•	•	•	
−67 kg (Welterweight)	•	•	•	•	•	•	•	•	•		•	
+67 kg											•	
−71 kg (Light middleweight)	•	•	•	•	•	•	•	•	•			
+71 kg								•	•			
−75 kg (Middleweight)	•	•	•	•	•	•	•					
+75 kg		•		•		•						
−81 kg (Light heavyweight)	•		•		•		•					
+81 kg							•					
−86 kg (Cruiserweight)	•		•		•							
−91 kg (Heavyweight)	•		•		•							
+91 kg (Super heavyweight)	•		•		•							
Total	13	11	13	11	14							

== Senior Championships ==
Edition	Year		Host city					
1	1993		Bangkok, Thailand					
2	1995		Bangkok, Thailand					
3	1996		Bangkok, Thailand					
4	1997		Bangkok, Thailand					
5	1999		Bangkok, Thailand					
6	2000		Bangkok, Thailand					
7	2001		Bangkok, Thailand					
8	2002		Bangkok, Thailand					
Edition	Year	Dates	Host city	Venue				
9	2003	—	Almaty, Kazakhstan	Baluan Sholak Sports Palace				
10	2005	31 May–7 June	Bangkok, Thailand	Mcc Hall The Mall Bangkapi				
11	2006	5–12 November	Bangkok, Thailand	Mcc Hall The Mall Bangkapi				
12	2007	27 November–5 December	Bangkok, Thailand	Fashion Island				
13	2008	September	Busan, South Korea	Sajik Arena				
14	2009	27 November–5 December	Bangkok, Thailand	Mcc Hall The Mall Bangkapi				
15	2010	27 November–5 December	Bangkok, Thailand	Mcc Hall The Mall Bangkapi				
16	2011	25–27 September	Tashkent, Uzbekistan	Tashkent Tennis Centre				
17	2012	19–28 May	Saint Petersburg, Russia	Yubileyny Sports Palace				
Edition	Year	Dates	Host city	Venue				Medal count winner
18	2014	6–13 September	Langkawi, Malaysia	Mahsuri International Exhibition Centre				Thailand (7)
19	2015	10–23 August	Bangkok, Thailand	Nimibutr Stadium				Thailand (6)
20	2016	19–28 May	Jönköping, Sweden	Kinnarps Arena				Thailand (6)
21	2017	3–12 May	Minsk, Belarus	Minsk Sports Palace				Thailand (8)
Edition	Year	Dates	Host city	Venue	Athletes	Nations	Events	Medal count winner
22	2018	10–19 May	Cancún, Mexico	Boulevard Kukulcan Lt45-47	404	77	37	Russia (7)
23	2019	20–28 July	Bangkok, Thailand	Huamark Sports Complex	600	89	44	Russia (6)
24	2021							
25	2023	1 –7 October	Kemer, Turkey	Daima Biz Resort				

== Youth Championships ==
Edition	Year	Dates	Host city	Venue				
1	2005	31 May–7 June	Bangkok, Thailand	Mcc Hall The Mall Bangkapi				
1	2006	5–12 November	Bangkok, Thailand	Mcc Hall The Mall Bangkapi				
2	2007	27 November–5 December	Bangkok, Thailand	Fashion Island				
3	2008	September	Busan, South Korea	Sajik Arena				
4	2009	27 November–5 December	Bangkok, Thailand	Mcc Hall The Mall Bangkapi				
5	2010	27 November–5 December	Bangkok, Thailand	Mcc Hall The Mall Bangkapi				
6	2011	25–27 September	Tashkent, Uzbekistan	Tashkent Tennis Centre				
7	2012	19–28 May	Saint Petersburg, Russia	Yubileyny Sports Palace				
8	2013	13–17 March	Istanbul, Turkey	Ahmet Cömert Sport Hall				
9	2014	6–13 September	Langkawi, Malaysia	Mahsuri International Exhibition Centre				
Edition	Year	Dates	Host city	Venue				Medal count winner
10	2015	10–23 August	Bangkok, Thailand	Nimibutr Stadium				Thailand (21)
11	2016	24 August–1 September	Bangkok, Thailand	Nimibutr Stadium				Thailand (27)
Edition	Year	Dates	Host city	Venue	Athletes	Nations	Events	Medal count winner
12	2017	3–11 August	Bangkok, Thailand	National Stadium	767	77	110	Thailand (49)
13	2018	Kemer, Turkey	Bangkok, Thailand	National Stadium	635	86	99	Thailand (31)
14	2019	28 September–6 October	Antalya, Turkey	Lara Turizm Yolu Kundu Mevkii				
	2023	1 –7 October	Kemer, Turkey	Daima Biz Resort				
