= 2010 IFMA World Muaythai Championships =

The 2010 IFMA World Muaythai Championships was held from 27 November to 5 December 2010 in Bangkok, Thailand.

== Medalists ==
=== Elite A ===
Event	Gold	Silver	Bronze
45 kg	Koshkyn Oleksiy; Ukraine	Mirolimov Oleksiy; Uzbekistan	
48 kg	Nopphadon Khongsrioon; Thailand	Chan Kai Tik; Hong Kong	Satqinov Sherzodbek; Uzbekistan
48 kg	Nopphadon Khongsrioon; Thailand	Chan Kai Tik; Hong Kong	Korneev Yuri; Russia
51 kg	Sonsiri Rathrong; Thailand	Dodon Roman; Ukraine	Kostilev Vitali; Russia
51 kg	Sonsiri Rathrong; Thailand	Dodon Roman; Ukraine	Mussin Ilyas; Kazakhstan
54 kg	Sattra Paleenaram; Thailand	Khegai Arnold; Ukraine	Kasimov Ozodbek; Uzbekistan
54 kg	Sattra Paleenaram; Thailand	Khegai Arnold; Ukraine	Sadvakassov Zhanibek; Kazakhstan
57 kg	Trishyn Kostyantyn; Ukraine	Abramov Alexander; Russia	Hamzenejad Reza; Iran
57 kg	Trishyn Kostyantyn; Ukraine	Abramov Alexander; Russia	Avanesov Artem; Belarus
60 kg	Worawit Chitamnuai; Thailand	Baimukhambetov Talgat; Kazakhstan	Handala Hamza; France
60 kg	Worawit Chitamnuai; Thailand	Baimukhambetov Talgat; Kazakhstan	Varats Dzmitry; Belarus
63.5 kg	Panupan Tunjod; Thailand	Kulaba Sergii; Ukraine	Maruha Maksim; Belarus
63.5 kg	Panupan Tunjod; Thailand	Kulaba Sergii; Ukraine	Shahbazi Vahid; Iran
67 kg	Jeerasak In-Udom; Thailand	Shevchenko Ivan; Ukraine	Hamza Rahmani; Belgium
67 kg	Jeerasak In-Udom; Thailand	Shevchenko Ivan; Ukraine	Kahhorov Mavlonbek; Uzbekistan
71 kg	Magomedov Zaynalabid; Russia	Hurkou Vitali; Belarus	Vahid Roshani; Iran
71 kg	Magomedov Zaynalabid; Russia	Hurkou Vitali; Belarus	Armin Malti; Thailand
75 kg	Valent Dzmitry; Belarus	Semenov Valentin; Russia	Mansour Ibrahimi; Afghanistan
75 kg	Valent Dzmitry; Belarus	Semenov Valentin; Russia	Nikiforov Vitalii; Ukraine
81 kg	Vakhitov Artem; Russia	Abdulin Dzmitry; Belarus	De Bonte Marc; Belgium
81 kg	Vakhitov Artem; Russia	Abdulin Dzmitry; Belarus	Sengirov Nurbolat; Kazakhstan
86 kg	Oliynyk Oleksandr; Ukraine	Herasimchuk Andrei; Belarus	Yapi Michael; France
86 kg	Oliynyk Oleksandr; Ukraine	Herasimchuk Andrei; Belarus	Nazarov Javlon; Uzbekistan
91 kg	Hutnik Ondřej; Czech Republic	Hancharonak Dzianis; Belarus	Rogava Tsotne; Ukraine
91 kg	Hutnik Ondřej; Czech Republic	Hancharonak Dzianis; Belarus	Grajs Franc; Slovenia
+91 kg	Verlinden Filip; Belgium	Calucrbc Christian; Denmark	Kudzin Aliaksei; Belarus
+91 kg	Verlinden Filip; Belgium	Calucrbc Christian; Denmark	Hajiyev Nadir; Russia

=== Women's events ===
Event	Gold	Silver	Bronze
45 kg	Loikkanen Lotta; Finland	Abissa Mariam; Morocco	Tsang Wai Ying; Hong Kong
45 kg	Loikkanen Lotta; Finland	Abissa Mariam; Morocco	Siew Bee Dino Ding; Malaysia
48 kg	Benjaporn Promma; Thailand	Eddbali Khadija; Morocco	Nigmatzyanova Oygyl; Russia
48 kg	Benjaporn Promma; Thailand	Eddbali Khadija; Morocco	Chyslova Liudmila; Belarus
51 kg	Naranjo Fernandez Eva Maria; Spain	Mezyan Jihad; Morocco	Kolodezh Bella; Russia
51 kg	Naranjo Fernandez Eva Maria; Spain	Mezyan Jihad; Morocco	Pinto Fatima; Norway
54 kg	Vandayeva Katsiaryna; Belarus	Ouazri Asmae; Morocco	Diken Funda; Turkey
54 kg	Vandayeva Katsiaryna; Belarus	Ouazri Asmae; Morocco	Vorobyova Elena; Russia
57 kg	Muratava Alena; Belarus	Heuston Kate; Australia	Lobo Maria; Portugal
57 kg	Muratava Alena; Belarus	Heuston Kate; Australia	Shelomentseva Asya; Russia
60 kg	Ivashkevich Ala; Belarus	El Majydy Aicha; Morocco	Lewis Caley; Australia
60 kg	Ivashkevich Ala; Belarus	El Majydy Aicha; Morocco	Tyni Emma; Sweden
63.5 kg	Shevchenko Valentina; Peru	Lansberg Lina; Sweden	Pestana Alicia; Australia
63.5 kg	Shevchenko Valentina; Peru	Lansberg Lina; Sweden	Willberg Anna; Finland
67 kg	Hicyakmazer Nurhayat; Turkey	Nilsson Elina; Sweden	Lockwood Tracey; New Zealand
67 kg	Hicyakmazer Nurhayat; Turkey	Nilsson Elina; Sweden	Lyczko Ksenia; Poland
71 kg	Kalinina Maryna; Belarus	Loch Mariza; Brazil	
91 kg	Shelley McBride; New Zealand	Ciadjiev Nadir; Russia	

=== Elite B ===
Event	Gold	Silver	Bronze
48 kg	Kholkhujaev Anvar; Uzbekistan	Yeung Wai Lun; Hong Kong	— [[|]]
48 kg	Kholkhujaev Anvar; Uzbekistan	Yeung Wai Lun; Hong Kong	— [[|]]
51 kg	Tak Linno; Australia	Singh N Boynaa; India	Walker Kenny; England
51 kg	Tak Linno; Australia	Singh N Boynaa; India	Byman Ulf; Sweden
54 kg	Kemal Nurym; Kazakhstan	Mcgrath Derrick; Canada	Sengel Ozan; Turkey
54 kg	Kemal Nurym; Kazakhstan	Mcgrath Derrick; Canada	Huang Haigang; China
57 kg	Aram Luke; Australia	Azerbiev Murat; Belarus	Amirzhanov Nyrlyorken; Kazakhstan
57 kg	Aram Luke; Australia	Azerbiev Murat; Belarus	Juncker Stefan; Denmark
60 kg	Abdulmaleki Masoud; Iran	Mederos Cabrera David; Spain	Wang Kang; China
60 kg	Abdulmaleki Masoud; Iran	Mederos Cabrera David; Spain	Kwok Ka Man; Hong Kong
63.5 kg	Dawoodu Hakeem; Canada	Taaouati Soufiane; Morocco	Geuing Woo Choi; South Korea
63.5 kg	Dawoodu Hakeem; Canada	Taaouati Soufiane; Morocco	Novruzov Ramil; Belarus
67 kg	Alamdamezam Seyed Eissa; Iran	Soufiane Zridy; Morocco	Guo Dongwang; China
67 kg	Alamdamezam Seyed Eissa; Iran	Soufiane Zridy; Morocco	Kekarainen Jarkko; Finland
71 kg	Ibrahim; Iran	Zhang Xiaolong; China	Muskotaly Balint; Hungary
71 kg	Ibrahim; Iran	Zhang Xiaolong; China	Atakan Aslan Cagan; Turkey
75 kg	Scott Caley; United States	Alvarez Calzas David; Spain	Duysebayev Ruslan; Kazakhstan
75 kg	Scott Caley; United States	Alvarez Calzas David; Spain	Simone Ballerini; Italy
81 kg	Bouamama Kada; France	Vallin Petter; Sweden	Mels Baurzhan; Kazakhstan
81 kg	Bouamama Kada; France	Vallin Petter; Sweden	Castle Andrew; Australia
86 kg	Sy Sadibou; Sweden	Ters Rinalds; Latvia	Alizier Thomas; France
86 kg	Sy Sadibou; Sweden	Ters Rinalds; Latvia	Toplak Tadej; Slovenia
91 kg	Ibragimov Ysuf; Uzbekistan	Kristap Zile; Latvia	Adouki Pierre; Canada
91 kg	Ibragimov Ysuf; Uzbekistan	Kristap Zile; Latvia	Dave Nielsen; United States
+91 kg	Raušer Luboš; Czech Republic	Tashpulatov Jobirbek; Uzbekistan	Zentai Mate; Hungary
+91 kg	Raušer Luboš; Czech Republic	Tashpulatov Jobirbek; Uzbekistan	Hoareau Wilfried; France

=== Junior Male events ===
Event	Gold	Silver	Bronze
45 kg	Nabati Kamran; Russia	Abdugaliyev Kenes; Kazakhstan	Blotski Uladzislau; Belarus
45 kg	Nabati Kamran; Russia	Abdugaliyev Kenes; Kazakhstan	Wescott Tobias; Australia
48 kg	Buch Denys; Ukraine	Nalivaika Aliaksei; Belarus	Magomedov Suleyman; Russia
48 kg	Buch Denys; Ukraine	Nalivaika Aliaksei; Belarus	Kara Murat; Turkey
51 kg	Hamech Halim; France	Khalimov Gulomjon; Uzbekistan	Mikhovich Eduard; Belarus
51 kg	Hamech Halim; France	Khalimov Gulomjon; Uzbekistan	Bultabai Bultabav; Kazakhstan
54 kg	Zarinfar Ali; Iran	Kostylev Sergey; Russia	Dzalogoniya Onise; Ukraine
54 kg	Zarinfar Ali; Iran	Kostylev Sergey; Russia	Rocl Aljavado; Mexico
57 kg	Monastyrskyy Igor; Ukraine	Rustamov Ilkhomjon; Uzbekistan	Zakzook Izzeldeen; Jordan
57 kg	Monastyrskyy Igor; Ukraine	Rustamov Ilkhomjon; Uzbekistan	Ustinenko Roman; Russia
60 kg	Janiev Khayal; Russia	Hishmeh Ammar; Jordan	Davis Kirk; New Zealand
60 kg	Janiev Khayal; Russia	Hishmeh Ammar; Jordan	Chin Ngai Chung; Hong Kong
63.5 kg	Koroshov Zakhar; Russia	Zibrau Yahor; Belarus	Rhomdane Hafed; France
63.5 kg	Koroshov Zakhar; Russia	Zibrau Yahor; Belarus	Kim Suk Min; South Korea
67 kg	Davtyan Yuri; Russia	Staravoitau Liubamir; Belarus	Gershon Itay; Israel
67 kg	Davtyan Yuri; Russia	Staravoitau Liubamir; Belarus	Salvados Dylan; France
71 kg	Marchanka Kiryl; Belarus	Semyonov Vasily; Russia	Staszczak Oskar Dawid; Poland
71 kg	Marchanka Kiryl; Belarus	Semyonov Vasily; Russia	Beyazit Ugurcan; Turkey
75 kg	Maghakyan Syrik; Russia	Babazhanov Sherzad; Belarus	Koprowski Grzegorz Stanislaw; Poland
75 kg	Maghakyan Syrik; Russia	Babazhanov Sherzad; Belarus	Sovetbekov Nooruzbek; Kyrgyzstan
81 kg	Remyga Iaroslav; Ukraine	Pundikov Alexander; Russia	Anshuman; India
81 kg	Remyga Iaroslav; Ukraine	Pundikov Alexander; Russia	Szkudlarek Remigiusz Jan; Poland
86 kg	Catipovic Toni; Croatia	Aanjelkovic Stefan; Serbia	Marufov Islomjon; Uzbekistan
86 kg	Catipovic Toni; Croatia	Aanjelkovic Stefan; Serbia	Burkov Dmitri; Estonia

=== Junior Female events ===
Event	Gold	Silver	Bronze
48 kg	Emir Semiht; Turkey	Markova Alice; Russia	Manaka Maryna; Belarus
48 kg	Emir Semiht; Turkey	Markova Alice; Russia	Ryhannah; Malaysia
60 kg	Yildirim Seda; Turkey	Symonenko Anastasiya; Ukraine	Inyuh Anastasia; Russia
60 kg	Yildirim Seda; Turkey	Symonenko Anastasiya; Ukraine	Squires Robyn; Canada
63.5 kg	Vasil'eva Anastasia; Russia	Brittany Collins; Canada	
