= 2012 IFMA World Muaythai Championships =

The 2012 IFMA World Muaythai Championships was held from 5 to 12 September 2012 in Saint Petersburg, Russia.

== Medalists ==
=== Elite A ===
| Weight | Bout | Red Corner (Finalist) | Blue Corner (Finalist) | Bronze Medalists |
|---|---|---|---|---|
| 45 kg | A 129 | Abdulvosid Buranov (TJK) | Salavatov Adbulkerim Dagirovich (RUS) | Karimkhani Mojtaba (IRI) Khamraev Temur (UZB) |
| 45 kg | A 129 | — Final — | | Karimkhani Mojtaba (IRI) Khamraev Temur (UZB) |
| 48 kg | A 130 | PROKUDA OLEKSANDR (UKR) | Sirakam Manus (THA) | Kaldybayev Rauan (KAZ) Usoyan Ali Otarovich (RUS) |
| 48 kg | A 130 | — Final — | | Kaldybayev Rauan (KAZ) Usoyan Ali Otarovich (RUS) |
| 51 kg | A 131 | Radsarong Sonsiri (THA) | Hong Giang (SWE) | Sayadi Mehrdad (IRI) BLIZNIOU Aliaksei (BLR) |
| 51 kg | A 131 | — Final — | | Sayadi Mehrdad (IRI) BLIZNIOU Aliaksei (BLR) |
| 71 kg | A 137 | Magomedov Zaynalabid Gablitdinovich (RUS) | HURKOU Vital (BLR) | KOPIEC MATEUSZ (POL) Pakcotakang Surasak (THA) |
| 71 kg | A 137 | — Final — | | KOPIEC MATEUSZ (POL) Pakcotakang Surasak (THA) |
| 54 kg | A 132 | ZAYATS Andrei (BLR) | Wongsa Preecha (THA) | Mussin Ilyas (KAZ) Gavrilov Daniil Gennadievich (RUS) |
| 54 kg | A 132 | — Final — | | Mussin Ilyas (KAZ) Gavrilov Daniil Gennadievich (RUS) |
| 57 kg | A 133 | Kanpricha Channarong (THA) | TRISHYN KONSTYANTYN (UKR) | Abramov Aleksande Vladimirovich (RUS) Botirov Shukhratbek (UZB) |
| 57 kg | A 133 | — Final — | | Abramov Aleksande Vladimirovich (RUS) Botirov Shukhratbek (UZB) |
| 91+ kg | A 142 | BOKAN Andrei (EST) | ROGAVA Tsotne (UKR) | Domenico Deserio (ITA) Shelepov Semen Olegovich (RUS) |
| 91+ kg | A 142 | — Final — | | Domenico Deserio (ITA) Shelepov Semen Olegovich (RUS) |
| 75 kg | A 138 | VALENT Dzmitry (BLR) | Khuzin Konstantin Radikovich (RUS) | Umayev Emil (KAZ) MEZATNI Kamel (ALG) |
| 75 kg | A 138 | — Final — | | Umayev Emil (KAZ) MEZATNI Kamel (ALG) |
| 60 kg | A 134 | VASYLIOGLO MYKHAILO (UKR) | Thoetkiat Suwat (THA) | AVANESOV Artem (BLR) Antoine Krisztian HABASH (HUN) |
| 60 kg | A 134 | — Final — | | AVANESOV Artem (BLR) Antoine Krisztian HABASH (HUN) |
| 63.5 kg | A 135 | Klumya Akephon (THA) | LIUBCHENKO Igor (UKR) | VARATS Dzmitry (BLR) DAWODU Hakeem (CAN) |
| 63.5 kg | A 135 | — Final — | | VARATS Dzmitry (BLR) DAWODU Hakeem (CAN) |
| 81 kg | A 139 | DE BONTE Marc (BEL) | Levin Artem Valerievich (RUS) | BOUAMAMA KADA (FRA) ABDULIN Dzmitry (BLR) |
| 81 kg | A 139 | — Final — | | BOUAMAMA KADA (FRA) ABDULIN Dzmitry (BLR) |
| 67 kg | A 136 | KEHL Juri (GER) | KULEBIN Andrei (BLR) | Dee Teerapong (THA) Minaei Masoud (IRI) |
| 67 kg | A 136 | — Final — | | Dee Teerapong (THA) Minaei Masoud (IRI) |
| 86 kg | A 140 | Sy Sadibou (SWE) | Vakhitov Artem Olegovich (RUS) | Mirzamukhamedov Jasur (UZB) HERASIMCHUK Andrei (BLR) |
| 86 kg | A 140 | — Final — | | Mirzamukhamedov Jasur (UZB) HERASIMCHUK Andrei (BLR) |
| 91 kg | A 141 | Yusuf Ibqagimov (UZB) | HANCHARONAK Dzianis (BLR) | Massinissa Hamaili (ALG) Oleksandr Oliynyk (UKR) |
| 91 kg | A 141 | — Final — | | Massinissa Hamaili (ALG) Oleksandr Oliynyk (UKR) |

=== Women's events ===
| Event | Gold | Silver | Bronze |
|---|---|---|---|
| Elite Female 45 kg | Kaareskoski Kati; Finland | Liashkevich Alena; Belarus | Eriksson Annie; Sweden |
| Elite Female 45 kg | Kaareskoski Kati; Finland | Liashkevich Alena; Belarus | Babayan Alina; Russia |
| Elite Female 48 kg | Shcherbinina Anastasiya; Russia | Chyslova Liudmila; Belarus | Ruqsana Begum; England |
| Elite Female 48 kg | Shcherbinina Anastasiya; Russia | Chyslova Liudmila; Belarus | Maricel P Subang; Philippines |
| Elite Female 51 kg | Kijnerova Oksana; Russia | Suhonen Jonna; Finland | Preciosa Ocaya; Philippines |
| Elite Female 51 kg | Kijnerova Oksana; Russia | Suhonen Jonna; Finland | Rydberg Johanna; Sweden |
| Elite Female 54 kg | Ashleynichols; Canada | Colak Yasemin; Germany | Vandaryeva Katsiaryna; Belarus |
| Elite Female 54 kg | Ashleynichols; Canada | Colak Yasemin; Germany | Bas Meltem; Turkey |
| Elite Female 57 kg | Jedrzejczyk Joanna; Poland | Semail Katia; France | Fiedler Christin; Australia |
| Elite Female 57 kg | Jedrzejczyk Joanna; Poland | Semail Katia; France | Thyni Emma; Sweden |
| Elite Female 60 kg | Shevchenko Valentina; Peru | Viaryha Katsiaryna; Belarus | Vall Madeleine; Sweden |
| Elite Female 60 kg | Shevchenko Valentina; Peru | Viaryha Katsiaryna; Belarus | Rak Magdalena Edyta; Poland |
| Elite Female 63.5 kg | Länsberg Lina; Sweden | Walsh Melissa; Australia | Scheer Lindsay; United States |
| Elite Female 63.5 kg | Länsberg Lina; Sweden | Walsh Melissa; Australia | Langwagen Shila Sarah; Denmark |
| Elite Female 67 kg | Österlin Jennifer; Sweden | Bjorklund Heidi; Finland | Pitiot Angelique; France |
| Elite Female 67 kg | Österlin Jennifer; Sweden | Bjorklund Heidi; Finland | Timofeeva Tamara A Russia |
| Elite Female 71 kg | Mikolcevic Marija; Croatia | Nilsson Elina; Sweden | Bakissy Laetitia; France |
| Elite Female 71 kg | Mikolcevic Marija; Croatia | Nilsson Elina; Sweden | Empty [[|]] |
| Elite Female 75 kg | Ivas Andreja; Croatia | O Connell Denise; Ireland | Edla Nemi; Finland |
| Elite Female 75 kg | Ivas Andreja; Croatia | O Connell Denise; Ireland | Melekhonova Oksana; Russia |

=== Elite B ===
| Weight | Bout | Red Corner (Finalist) | Blue Corner (Finalist) | Bronze Medalists |
|---|---|---|---|---|
| 45 kg | B 150 | Arslanov Magomedsaid (RUS) | Mardonov Bekhruz (UZB) | None listed |
| 45 kg | B 150 | — Final — | | None listed |
| 48 kg | B 151 | Omarov Arsen Magomedovich (RUS) | Yoon Deokjae (KOR) | Kantavenko Andrey (UKR) Bitaga Jossie R. (PHI) |
| 48 kg | B 151 | — Final — | | Kantavenko Andrey (UKR) Bitaga Jossie R. (PHI) |
| 51 kg | B 152 | Galiyev Ishan (KAZ) | Yuldashev Jakhangir (UZB) | BAKTYBAEV ALTYNBEK (KGZ) BURHAN ERDEN (TUR) |
| 51 kg | B 152 | — Final — | | BAKTYBAEV ALTYNBEK (KGZ) BURHAN ERDEN (TUR) |
| 54 kg | B 153 | Yildirim Selim (TUR) | Zherebtsov Vasiliy Viktorovich (RUS) | Mukhitov Batyrkhan (KAZ) Philip Delarmino (PHI) |
| 54 kg | B 153 | — Final — | | Mukhitov Batyrkhan (KAZ) Philip Delarmino (PHI) |
| 57 kg | B 154 | BENGTSEN Julian (DEN) | URUC VEDAT (TUR) | Tuzovskiy Kirill Anatolievich (RUS) HUSSAINI Mohd Jafar (AFG) |
| 57 kg | B 154 | — Final — | | Tuzovskiy Kirill Anatolievich (RUS) HUSSAINI Mohd Jafar (AFG) |
| 60 kg | B 155 | Aygubov Khochbar (RUS) | Franzén Johan (SWE) | RASMUSSEN Marcelo (DEN) AYDIN EREN ALI (TUR) |
| 60 kg | B 155 | — Final — | | RASMUSSEN Marcelo (DEN) AYDIN EREN ALI (TUR) |
| 63.5 kg | B 156 | SURATCHAI Sosom (FIN) | ATALAY ABDULMENAF (TUR) | Choi Seung Woo (KOR) Joxti Boyev (UZB) |
| 63.5 kg | B 156 | — Final — | | Choi Seung Woo (KOR) Joxti Boyev (UZB) |
| 67 kg | B 157 | Dzhaniev Khayal (RUS) | Ekvall Adel (SWE) | Hassanov Sanjarbek (UZB) Kasper Tobbcino Andeiaw (DEN) |
| 67 kg | B 157 | — Final — | | Hassanov Sanjarbek (UZB) Kasper Tobbcino Andeiaw (DEN) |
| 71 kg | B 158 | Davtyan Yurik Zograkovich (RUS) | Veselinov (BUL) | KHALID Fahzan (DEN) HANe (AUS) |
| 71 kg | B 158 | — Final — | | KHALID Fahzan (DEN) HANe (AUS) |
| 75 kg | B 159 | Aripov Saidakhmad (UZB) | Semenov Valentin Vladimirovich (RUS) | Banghall Andre (SWE) Valuevich Dmitrii (KGZ) |
| 75 kg | B 159 | — Final — | | Banghall Andre (SWE) Valuevich Dmitrii (KGZ) |
| 81 kg | B 160 | TOUSCH CEDRIC (FRA) | WOLF Lukas (CZE) | Turgut kocakaya (TUR) Hero Johan (SWE) |
| 81 kg | B 160 | — Final — | | Turgut kocakaya (TUR) Hero Johan (SWE) |
| 86 kg | B 161 | BEHAN Stephen (AUS) | Toft Andrew (RUS) | Matt Balcer (USA) SCHULTZ Carl Johan (DEN) |
| 86 kg | B 161 | — Final — | | Matt Balcer (USA) SCHULTZ Carl Johan (DEN) |
| 91 kg | B 162 | Alexsander Maskov (BUL) | Vezhevatov Aleksandr Sergeevich (RUS) | Frederic Langwagen (DEN) Ismail daqoziyev (KAZ) |
| 91 kg | B 162 | — Final — | | Frederic Langwagen (DEN) Ismail daqoziyev (KAZ) |
| +91 kg | B 163 | SINEVIRSKI Kiril (BUL) | Gadzhiev Nadyr Niyazbekovich (RUS) | Asaady Azad (IRI) Rakhmangulov Marat (KAZ) |
| +91 kg | B 163 | — Final — | | Asaady Azad (IRI) Rakhmangulov Marat (KAZ) |

=== Junior ===
| Weight | Bout | Red Corner (Finalist) | Blue Corner (Finalist) | Bronze Medalists |
|---|---|---|---|---|
| 40 kg | JM 90 | Ali Sajdan (IRQ) | Lihtarovich Alifh (BLR) | None listed |
| 40 kg | JM 90 | — Final — | | None listed |
| 42 kg | JM 91 | Oleg (UKR) | Hasbullg (RUS) | Daniel (NZL) Alex (BLR) |
| 42 kg | JM 91 | — Final — | | Daniel (NZL) Alex (BLR) |
| 45 kg | JM 92 | Aeier Abdul (RUS) | Oktiqov Havrulo (UZB) | Andreassend Eddy (NZL) SENHAJI Bilal (DEN) |
| 45 kg | JM 92 | — Final — | | Andreassend Eddy (NZL) SENHAJI Bilal (DEN) |
| 48 kg | JM 93 | Icrailov Magomed Askhabovich (RUS) | Manapov Rasulla (KAZ) | Kahramonov Farruh (UZB) KARTAVENKO ANDRIY (UKR) |
| 48 kg | JM 93 | — Final — | | Kahramonov Farruh (UZB) KARTAVENKO ANDRIY (UKR) |
| 51 kg | JM 94 | Can (TUR) | Mannonov Firdavsiy (UZB) | Taalaibek Uulu (KGZ) Nurmanov Dias (KAZ) |
| 51 kg | JM 94 | — Final — | | Taalaibek Uulu (KGZ) Nurmanov Dias (KAZ) |
| 54 kg | JM 95 | YATSENKO Artem (UKR) | Protsenko Eduard (RUS) | Islamuddin (AFG) Li Gang (CHN) |
| 54 kg | JM 95 | — Final — | | Islamuddin (AFG) Li Gang (CHN) |
| 57 kg | JM 96 | Gayer Itai (ISR) | ERDOGAN ALPEREN (TUR) | Olsson Rasmus (SWE) Kuisenko sergey (UKR) |
| 57 kg | JM 96 | — Final — | | Olsson Rasmus (SWE) Kuisenko sergey (UKR) |
| 60 kg | JM 97 | Amirkhanov Magomed Magomedovich (RUS) | Yousset Asuik (DEN) | Waheed Ali Saher (IRQ) Raimbek Sembek (KAZ) |
| 60 kg | JM 97 | — Final — | | Waheed Ali Saher (IRQ) Raimbek Sembek (KAZ) |
| 63.5 kg | JM 98 | Chamberlain Kane (GBR) | HOZANLI HAYRI DOGAN (TUR) | Wisen William (SWE) Zaynukov Magomed Bekshievich (RUS) |
| 63.5 kg | JM 98 | — Final — | | Wisen William (SWE) Zaynukov Magomed Bekshievich (RUS) |
| 67 kg | JM 99 | Vadzim Vaskov (BLR) | Papazyan Artur (RUS) | Tolipon M (UZB) Senichev (UKR) |
| 67 kg | JM 99 | — Final — | | Tolipon M (UZB) Senichev (UKR) |
| 71 kg | JM 100 | Amirkhanov Gadzhimurad Anvarbekovich (RUS) | JABOTYNSKIY Arsen (UKR) | SEXTON Dallas (CAN) Tahir Oflu (TUR) |
| 71 kg | JM 100 | — Final — | | SEXTON Dallas (CAN) Tahir Oflu (TUR) |
| 75 kg | JM 101 | NABIYEV ALIMA (UKR) | Nuzhin Nikolay Valerievich (RUS) | CUZIC Mihovil (CRO) STARAVOITAU Liubamir (BLR) |
| 75 kg | JM 101 | — Final — | | CUZIC Mihovil (CRO) STARAVOITAU Liubamir (BLR) |
| 81 kg | JM 102 | Mika (BLR) | Ozdoev Akhmed (RUS) | Ivan Grigoriev (KAZ) CARLSEN Joseph (DEN) |
| 81 kg | JM 102 | — Final — | | Ivan Grigoriev (KAZ) CARLSEN Joseph (DEN) |
| 86 kg | JM 103 | Cunial Erik (ITA) | Magomedov Gashim Kuramagomedovich (RUS) | Mark Hruscs (LAT) |
| 86 kg | JM 103 | — Final — | | Mark Hruscs (LAT) |
| 91 kg | JM 104 | Islamov Tamirlan Rasulovich (RUS) | KOGAN LEONID (UKR) | Albert (EST) |
| 91 kg | JM 104 | — Final — | | Albert (EST) |

| Weight | Bout | Red Corner (Finalist) | Blue Corner (Finalist) | Bronze Medalists |
Junior Female (JF)
| 45 kg | JF 12 | Boyko Dinara (RUS) | Carpenter Mikaela (USA) | None listed |
| 45 kg | JF 12 | — Final — | | None listed |
| 48 kg | JF 13 | Taneceia Deirdra (NED) | TUCKER Maggie (CAN) | Musuratova Dakira (RUS) BURULAY RUMEYSA (TUR) |
| 48 kg | JF 13 | — Final — | | Musuratova Dakira (RUS) BURULAY RUMEYSA (TUR) |
| 51 kg | JF 14 | Leonie Hardman (GBR) | SEZER TUGCE (TUR) | HOUICHA KHALISSA (FRA) KULINICH ANASTASIA (UKR) |
| 51 kg | JF 14 | — Final — | | HOUICHA KHALISSA (FRA) KULINICH ANASTASIA (UKR) |
| 54 kg | JF 15 | Yudina Lyubov (RUS) | AKIN IREM (TUR) | MATSUK VALERIIA (UKR) Manaka maryna (BLR) |
| 54 kg | JF 15 | — Final — | | MATSUK VALERIIA (UKR) Manaka maryna (BLR) |
| 57 kg | JF 16 | Dyachkova Natalya Dmitrievna (RUS) | NESTSIARENKA Viktoryia (BLR) | Sharamonova Anastasiia (UKR) |
| 57 kg | JF 16 | — Final — | | Sharamonova Anastasiia (UKR) |
| 63.5 kg | JF 17 | Chenchtra Wankhrvea (THA) | Scotland Sophlegallagher (GBR) | Manesa Eseta (NZL) Nadtochey Yana Igorevna (RUS) |
| 63.5 kg | JF 17 | — Final — | | Manesa Eseta (NZL) Nadtochey Yana Igorevna (RUS) |
