= 2006 IFMA World Muaythai Championships =

The 2006 IFMA World Muaythai Championships was held from 5 to 12 November 2006 in Bangkok, Thailand.

== Medalists ==
=== Elite A ===
Event	Gold	Silver	Bronze
45 kg	Chaowarach Luangphon; Thailand	Bayakov Vladimir; Russia	Aziz Eshniyazov; Uzbekistan
45 kg	Chaowarach Luangphon; Thailand	Bayakov Vladimir; Russia	Ehsan Adnani; Iran
48 kg	Tyabin Denis; Russia	Yatzun Andrey; Ukraine	Jadat Sintiphong; Thailand
48 kg	Tyabin Denis; Russia	Yatzun Andrey; Ukraine	Abduvakhid Talipov; Uzbekistan
51 kg	Damrong Seekhao; Thailand	Popou Aleksey; Belarus	R. Zakhanmoradi; Iran
51 kg	Damrong Seekhao; Thailand	Popou Aleksey; Belarus	Logunov Denis; Russia
54 kg	Supachai Payunhan; Thailand	Sherxod Sharipov; Uzbekistan	Glvboehenko Maksym; Ukraine
54 kg	Supachai Payunhan; Thailand	Sherxod Sharipov; Uzbekistan	Almas Sakayev; Kazakhstan
57 kg	Satit Kaowprapai; Thailand	Chris White; Australia	Darren Robson; Canada
57 kg	Satit Kaowprapai; Thailand	Chris White; Australia	Pekarchik Pavel; Belarus
60 kg	Panupan Tanjad; Thailand	Sone Vannathy; New Zealand	Kulebin Andrei; Belarus
60 kg	Panupan Tanjad; Thailand	Sone Vannathy; New Zealand	Dubov Maxim; Ukraine
63.5 kg	Makeev Standislav; Russia	Vuttirong Pramaree; Thailand	Ali Ekranpoor; Iran
63.5 kg	Makeev Standislav; Russia	Vuttirong Pramaree; Thailand	Martin Akthar; Sweden
67 kg	Morev Alexander; Russia	Ameur Redwan; France	Vakarash Andrey; Ukraine
67 kg	Morev Alexander; Russia	Ameur Redwan; France	Valent Dmitry; Belarus
71 kg	Kishenko Artur; Ukraine	Bezouh Karim; France	Rahhaoui Mohamed; Belgium
71 kg	Kishenko Artur; Ukraine	Bezouh Karim; France	Buldakov Viacheslav; Russia
75 kg	Nakonechny Petro; Ukraine	Levin Artem; Russia	Zaid Fikri; Netherlands
75 kg	Nakonechny Petro; Ukraine	Levin Artem; Russia	Gorbachev Yury; Belarus
81 kg	Hancharonak Dzianis; Belarus	Kassenov Almaz; Kazakhstan	Jorgo Tanis; Netherlands
81 kg	Hancharonak Dzianis; Belarus	Kassenov Almaz; Kazakhstan	Prist-West, Tyron; Germany
86 kg	Samedov Zabit; Belarus	Migolatyeu Vacheslav; Ukraine	Harold Olsen; Australia
86 kg	Samedov Zabit; Belarus	Migolatyeu Vacheslav; Ukraine	Vansteene Andy; Belgium
91 kg	Neledva Masm; Ukraine	Shelepov Semen; Russia	Koch, Sven; Germany
91 kg	Neledva Masm; Ukraine	Shelepov Semen; Russia	Kiril Oendzhurov; Bulgaria
+91 kg	Ustinov Alexander; Russia	Teodor Sariyev; Kazakhstan	Hossein Mohammady Garfamy; Iran
+91 kg	Ustinov Alexander; Russia	Teodor Sariyev; Kazakhstan	Kudin Alexei; Belarus

=== Women's events ===
Event	Gold	Silver	Bronze
45 kg	Syluie Charbonneav; Canada	Neng Hamidah; Indonesia	Strizhko Oksana; Russia
45 kg	Syluie Charbonneav; Canada	Neng Hamidah; Indonesia	Wu, Ki–Ling (Polly); Hong Kong
48 kg	Prakaydaw Pakmalee; Thailand	Madagasear Ravelosata; Madagascar	Mitrenko Julia; Russia
48 kg	Prakaydaw Pakmalee; Thailand	Madagasear Ravelosata; Madagascar	Mappela Lehtonen; Finland
51 kg	Sararat Kongsawang; Thailand	Petra Janssen van Doom; Netherlands	Alisen Casey; United States
51 kg	Sararat Kongsawang; Thailand	Petra Janssen van Doom; Netherlands	So, Ming–Wai; Hong Kong
54 kg	Ivanova Olga; Russia	Milja Heino; Finland	Jennifer Nguyen; United States
54 kg	Ivanova Olga; Russia	Milja Heino; Finland	Biriuk Nalalila; Ukraine
57 kg	Misty Sutherland; Canada	Shevchenko Valenino; Russia	Lucia Corrigaj; England
57 kg	Misty Sutherland; Canada	Shevchenko Valenino; Russia	Heahrev Odonnell; Australia
60 kg	Sandra Bastian; Canada	Nutrujar Pradubmook; Thailand	Semenova Julia; Russia
60 kg	Sandra Bastian; Canada	Nutrujar Pradubmook; Thailand	Janna Vaughan; New Zealand
63.5 kg	Christina Martin; United States	Lisa Ostman; Sweden	Sherree Halliday; England
63.5 kg	Christina Martin; United States	Lisa Ostman; Sweden	Adriana Sollberger; Switzerland
67 kg	Pernilla Jonsson; Sweden	Jacgueline Fuchs; Switzerland	Sue Glassey; New Zealand
67 kg	Pernilla Jonsson; Sweden	Jacgueline Fuchs; Switzerland	Mira Marjamaki; Finland
71 kg	Mia Etelapelto; Finland	Magadalena; Sweden	Rukeya Slamang; South Africa
71 kg	Mia Etelapelto; Finland	Magadalena; Sweden	Sindy Marcicic; Australia
75 kg	Christina Kilbinger; Denmark	Lesley Joy van Es; Netherlands	Martin Levy; South Africa
75 kg	Christina Kilbinger; Denmark	Lesley Joy van Es; Netherlands	Celan Lillecvapp; Australia

=== Elite B ===
Event	Gold	Silver	Bronze
45–48 kg	Char Kal Tik; Hong Kong	Rivat Asphqndiyrov; Russia	Yaha Hosseini; Iran
45–48 kg	Char Kal Tik; Hong Kong	Rivat Asphqndiyrov; Russia	Chau Bintiaup; Singapore
48–51 kg	To Hang Lam; Hong Kong	Wasith Auiawi; Indonesia	Lam Man Chon; Macau
48–51 kg	To Hang Lam; Hong Kong	Wasith Auiawi; Indonesia	Kim Tun Seung; South Korea
51–54 kg	Pyrer Turhsez; Poland	Kim Samg Min; South Korea	Fan Yuen Fai; Hong Kong
51–54 kg	Pyrer Turhsez; Poland	Kim Samg Min; South Korea	Farshio Kairmi; Iran
54–57 kg	Ra Ko To; Madagascar	Jung Byung; South Korea	Lee Ham Yam Kenniveth; Hong Kong
54–57 kg	Ra Ko To; Madagascar	Jung Byung; South Korea	Mohammed Charkaoui; Netherlands
57–60 kg	Abdulsaiamov Zaur; Russia	Gary Obrien; Scotland	Corey Gwaliasi; Australia
57–60 kg	Abdulsaiamov Zaur; Russia	Gary Obrien; Scotland	Niklas Carlesson; Sweden
60–63.5 kg	Joona Hulmi; Finland	Nate Smandych; Canada	Surasit Jaujaupa; Sweden
60–63.5 kg	Joona Hulmi; Finland	Nate Smandych; Canada	Steffen Weise; Denmark
63.5–67 kg	Adamov Samat; Kazakhstan	Daniel Moda; Brazil	Chong Suipiu; Hong Kong
63.5–67 kg	Adamov Samat; Kazakhstan	Daniel Moda; Brazil	Alexis Baena; Spain
67–71 kg	Skamkalov Artur; Russia	Joakim Karlsson; Sweden	Mauro Serra; Italy
67–71 kg	Skamkalov Artur; Russia	Joakim Karlsson; Sweden	Ternee Etim; England
71–75 kg	Mudryk Andrit; Ukraine	Jason Catbill; Canada	Roman Sifalda; Czech Republic
71–75 kg	Mudryk Andrit; Ukraine	Jason Catbill; Canada	Joseph Fjellgren; Sweden
75–81 kg	Shawn Yarborough; United States	Ian Coe; England	Ben Sorensen; Papua New Guinea
75–81 kg	Shawn Yarborough; United States	Ian Coe; England	Jesse Miles; Canada
81–85 kg	Redouan Cairo; Netherlands	Eduardo Virissimo; Brazil	Fabrizio Sacco; Italy
81–85 kg	Redouan Cairo; Netherlands	Eduardo Virissimo; Brazil	Kozlov Yevgen; Ukraine
86–91 kg	Ryan Faull; South Africa	Franc Kuipers; Netherlands	Leighton Prime; Australia
86–91 kg	Ryan Faull; South Africa	Franc Kuipers; Netherlands	Bruno Car; Canada
+91 kg	Nathan Gould; England	Michal Chmelesk; Poland	Olexanda Zubenko; Ukraine
+91 kg	Nathan Gould; England	Michal Chmelesk; Poland	Ronan Simon; Israel

=== Junior ===
Event	Gold	Silver	Bronze
42 kg	Alazau Chynhiz; Belarus	Tanbiev Alimpasha; Russia	Tim Johnson; Australia
42 kg	Alazau Chynhiz; Belarus	Tanbiev Alimpasha; Russia	Suthep Chanalong; Thailand
42–45 kg	Ade Per Mana; Indonesia	Oleg; Ukraine	Michael Slusar; Israel
42–45 kg	Ade Per Mana; Indonesia	Oleg; Ukraine	Walut Punjarit; Thailand
48–51 kg	Kalynyuk Ryslan; Ukraine	Thomas Bossen; Denmark	Muhd Taufiq; Singapore
48–51 kg	Kalynyuk Ryslan; Ukraine	Thomas Bossen; Denmark	Awbel; Spain
51–54 kg	Chan Kai Chung; Hong Kong	Kavaliov Siarhei; Belarus	Kieran M'askikll; Scotland
51–54 kg	Chan Kai Chung; Hong Kong	Kavaliov Siarhei; Belarus	Nelson Lottring; South Africa
54–57 kg	Agakerimon; Russia	Acam Galili; Israel	L. Suraj; India
54–57 kg	Agakerimon; Russia	Acam Galili; Israel	Maksym Kogan; Ukraine
57–60 kg	Saakya N.A. Russia	Michael Grasl; Austria	Ortik Musinov; Uzbekistan
57–60 kg	Saakya N.A. Russia	Michael Grasl; Austria	Weerat Watcharaporn; Thailand
60–63.5 kg	Korobchynskuy Artur; Ukraine	Ritchle Hccking; Scotland	Faraovi; Italy
60–63.5 kg	Korobchynskuy Artur; Ukraine	Ritchle Hccking; Scotland	Zhukouski Yauhen; Belarus
63.5–67 kg	Sebastilk Bartkowiak; Poland	John Douclas; Scotland	Mayboroda Illya; Ukraine

=== Junior ===
Event	Gold	Silver	Bronze
51–54 kg	Caroline Munroe; Australia	Brenda Shee; Singapore	H. Imran; Senegal
51–54 kg	Caroline Munroe; Australia	Brenda Shee; Singapore	Abit; Sri Lanka

== Overall results ==
=== Team World Champion (Male) ===
1. RUS Russia
2. THA Thailand
3. UKR Ukraine

=== Team World Champion (Female) ===
1. CAN Canada – THA Thailand
2. FIN Finland

=== Team Champion (B Division) ===
1. RUS Russia
2. ENG England
3. HKG Hong Kong

== Special awards ==
- Most Outstanding Boxer (Male): Hancharonak Dzianis (BLR)
- Most Outstanding Boxer (Female): Sandra Bastian (CAN)
- Best Wai Khru (Male): Kalinuk Tuslam (UKR)
- Best Wai Khru (Female): Sararat Khongsawang (THA)
- Most Prospective Boxer: Ra Ko To (MAD)
- Rising Star: Chan Kai Chung (HKG)
