= 2011 IFMA World Muaythai Championships =

The 2011 IFMA World Muaythai Championships was held from 20 to 27 September 2011 in Tashkent, Uzbekistan.

== Medalists ==
=== Elite A ===
Event	Gold	Silver	Bronze
Elite Male 45 kg	Prokuda Ojeksander; Ukraine	Abdvlkeriy Solove; Russia	Uddin Mohammed; England
Elite Male 45 kg	Prokuda Ojeksander; Ukraine	Abdvlkeriy Solove; Russia	Khounsard Abdolghader; Iran
Elite Male 48 kg	Chamnan Phiraphong; Thailand	Kholkhujaev Anvar; Uzbekistan	Koskkyn Oleksiy; Ukraine
Elite Male 48 kg	Chamnan Phiraphong; Thailand	Kholkhujaev Anvar; Uzbekistan	Madani Jamal; Iran
Elite Male 51 kg	Radsarong Sonsiri; Thailand	Rashevs'ky Dmytro; Ukraine	Madadi Mohammad; Iran
Elite Male 51 kg	Radsarong Sonsiri; Thailand	Rashevs'ky Dmytro; Ukraine	Skiba Siarhei; Belarus
Elite Male 54 kg	Paleenaram Narawut; Thailand	Zayats Andrei; Belarus	Buch Denys; Ukraine
Elite Male 54 kg	Paleenaram Narawut; Thailand	Zayats Andrei; Belarus	Serqei Kostylev; Russia
Elite Male 57 kg	Paleenaram Sattra; Thailand	Abramov Aleksander; Russia	Trishyn Kostyantyn; Ukraine
Elite Male 57 kg	Paleenaram Sattra; Thailand	Abramov Aleksander; Russia	Naghshbandi Seyedsalman; Iran
Elite Male 60 kg	Meejan Wuttichai; Thailand	Liubchenko Igor; Ukraine	Varats Dmitry; Belarus
Elite Male 60 kg	Meejan Wuttichai; Thailand	Liubchenko Igor; Ukraine	Hudoyberdiev Abdullo; Uzbekistan
Elite Male 63.5 kg	Kholmuratov Firdavsiy; Uzbekistan	Ruslan Yusubov; Russia	Akirzhanov Kazakhstan; Kazakhstan
Elite Male 63.5 kg	Kholmuratov Firdavsiy; Uzbekistan	Ruslan Yusubov; Russia	Chitamnuai Worawit; Thailand
Elite Male 67 kg	Inudom Jeerasak; Thailand	Kulebin Andrei; Belarus	Kahhorov Mavlonbek; Uzbekistan
Elite Male 67 kg	Inudom Jeerasak; Thailand	Kulebin Andrei; Belarus	Alamdarnezam Seyedisa; Iran
Elite Male 71 kg	Hurkov Vitaly; Belarus	Khuzin Konstantin; Russia	Gogokhiia Enriko; Ukraine
Elite Male 71 kg	Hurkov Vitaly; Belarus	Khuzin Konstantin; Russia	Smagulov Almas; Kazakhstan
Elite Male 75 kg	Nikiforov; Ukraine	Tobiasson Harris Alex; Sweden	Leocie De Keiksmaeker; Belgium
Elite Male 75 kg	Nikiforov; Ukraine	Tobiasson Harris Alex; Sweden	Ekrnpoor Khiavi Ebrahlm; Iran
Elite Male 81 kg	Varhition Artem; Russia	Abdulin Dmitry; Belarus	Joof Abdoulie; Sweden
Elite Male 81 kg	Varhition Artem; Russia	Abdulin Dmitry; Belarus	Boumama Kada; France
Elite Male 86 kg	Razani Majid; Iran	Vehgvatov Alxxamdr; Russia	Zawodni Jaroslaw; Poland
Elite Male 86 kg	Razani Majid; Iran	Vehgvatov Alxxamdr; Russia	Oliynyk Oleksandr; Ukraine
Elite Male 91 kg	Hanchanorak Dzianis; Belarus	Grajs Franc; Slovenia	Rogava Tsotne; Ukraine
Elite Male 91 kg	Hanchanorak Dzianis; Belarus	Grajs Franc; Slovenia	Shahram; Iran
Elite Male 91+ kg	Kudzin Aliaksei; Belarus	Tashpulatov Jobirbek; Uzbekistan	Bezus Dmytro; Ukraine
Elite Male 91+ kg	Kudzin Aliaksei; Belarus	Tashpulatov Jobirbek; Uzbekistan	Van Thielen Sebastien; Belgium

=== Women's events ===
Event	Gold	Silver	Bronze
Elite Female 45 kg	Promma Banjapon; Thailand	Eriksson Annie; Sweden	Seifabaci Mastahen; Iran
Elite Female 45 kg	Promma Banjapon; Thailand	Eriksson Annie; Sweden	Saiapui Heli; Finland
Elite Female 48 kg	Eddbali Khadija; Morocco	Ruatanem Manjo; Finland	Shvets Renata; Ukraine
Elite Female 48 kg	Eddbali Khadija; Morocco	Ruatanem Manjo; Finland	Milic Marijeta; Sweden
Elite Female 51 kg	Pinto Fatima; Norway	Ocaya Preciosa; Philippines	Rydberg Johanna; Sweden
Elite Female 51 kg	Pinto Fatima; Norway	Ocaya Preciosa; Philippines	Mihaylova Mariya; Bulgaria
Elite Female 54 kg	Drozdoua Valeriya; Russia	Isaksson Jessica; Sweden	Tajik Toghan Masoumeh; Iran
Elite Female 54 kg	Drozdoua Valeriya; Russia	Isaksson Jessica; Sweden	Colak Yasemin; Germany
Elite Female 57 kg	Jedrzejczyk Joanna; Poland	Olsson Maria; Sweden	Shelomentseva Asya; Russia
Elite Female 57 kg	Jedrzejczyk Joanna; Poland	Olsson Maria; Sweden	Vandaryeva Ekaterina; Belarus
Elite Female 60 kg	El Majydy Aicha; Morocco	Shevchenko Valentina; Peru	Vall Madeleine; Sweden
Elite Female 60 kg	El Majydy Aicha; Morocco	Shevchenko Valentina; Peru	Ishirgakova Aifiyo; Russia
Elite Female 63.5 kg	Shevchenko Antonina; Peru	Lansberg Lina; Sweden	Gupalo Valentyna; Ukraine
Elite Female 63.5 kg	Shevchenko Antonina; Peru	Lansberg Lina; Sweden	Svellana Usmanova; Russia
Elite Female 67 kg	Ndojevic Sanja; Sweden	Hasnouni Alaoui; Morocco	Canpolat Gozde; Turkey
Elite Female 67 kg	Ndojevic Sanja; Sweden	Hasnouni Alaoui; Morocco	Rahimi Esfidvajani Zakieh; Iran
Elite Female 71 kg	Elina Nilsson; Sweden	Jurisic Helena; Croatia	Mariza Looh; Brazil
Elite Female 71 kg	Elina Nilsson; Sweden	Jurisic Helena; Croatia	Kudaibergenova Galilea; Kyrgyzstan
Elite Female 75 kg	Mikolcevic Marija; Croatia	Assel Layth; Iraq	
Elite Female 91+ kg	Melikhova Awwa; Russia	Victoria Nansen; New Zealand	

=== Elite B ===
Event	Gold	Silver	Bronze
Elite Male 48 kg	Catalan Robin; Philippines	Hasani Abdul Khaliq; Afghanistan	Kaharov Ravshanbek; Uzbekistan
Elite Male 51 kg	Khalimov Gulomjon; Uzbekistan	Baktybaev Altynbek; Kyrgyzstan	Byman Ulf; Sweden
Elite Male 51 kg	Khalimov Gulomjon; Uzbekistan	Baktybaev Altynbek; Kyrgyzstan	Galiyev; Kazakhstan
Elite Male 54 kg	Rustamov Ilkhomjon; Uzbekistan	Kemal Nurym; Kazakhstan	Sengel Ozan; Turkey
Elite Male 54 kg	Rustamov Ilkhomjon; Uzbekistan	Kemal Nurym; Kazakhstan	Rezwani Ali Akbar; Afghanistan
Elite Male 57 kg	Khashimov Firdavs; Uzbekistan	Tukenbayen Adlet; Kazakhstan	Unlu Ismail Ozan; Turkey
Elite Male 57 kg	Khashimov Firdavs; Uzbekistan	Tukenbayen Adlet; Kazakhstan	Kaskaraev Daniiar; Kyrgyzstan
Elite Male 60 kg	Yallaev Askarjon; Uzbekistan	Koibogarov; Kazakhstan	Hamza Bougmza; Sweden
Elite Male 60 kg	Yallaev Askarjon; Uzbekistan	Koibogarov; Kazakhstan	Petrov Anton; Bulgaria
Elite Male 63.5 kg	Kaziyev Darkhan; Kazakhstan	Polosan Jonathan; Philippines	Mystafa-Ai-Saraji; Iraq
Elite Male 63.5 kg	Kaziyev Darkhan; Kazakhstan	Polosan Jonathan; Philippines	Juraev Bobur; Uzbekistan
Elite Male 67 kg	Guo Dongwang; China	Eridy Soufiane; Morocco	Batmaz Ali; Turkey
Elite Male 67 kg	Guo Dongwang; China	Eridy Soufiane; Morocco	Mustafayev Jabbar; Azerbaijan
Elite Male 71 kg	Adel Jawad; Iraq	Atanasov Nikolay; Bulgaria	Yusupov Sanjar; Uzbekistan
Elite Male 71 kg	Adel Jawad; Iraq	Atanasov Nikolay; Bulgaria	Salah Aboel Salam; England
Elite Male 75 kg	Aslan Cagan Atakan; Turkey	Aripov Saidakhmad; Uzbekistan	Rothwell Jarred; South Africa
Elite Male 75 kg	Aslan Cagan Atakan; Turkey	Aripov Saidakhmad; Uzbekistan	Edward Gill; England
Elite Male 81 kg	Pettersson Rickard; Sweden	Jiyanov Bekzod; Uzbekistan	Tomko Michal; Slovakia
Elite Male 81 kg	Pettersson Rickard; Sweden	Jiyanov Bekzod; Uzbekistan	Yengabulon Dayo; Kazakhstan
Elite Male 86 kg	Sotivoldiev Ilhomjon; Uzbekistan	Toplak Tadej; Slovenia	Te Wake James; New Zealand
Elite Male 86 kg	Sotivoldiev Ilhomjon; Uzbekistan	Toplak Tadej; Slovenia	Nielsen Kim; Denmark
Elite Male 91 kg	Mirzamukhamedov Jasur; Uzbekistan	Sawgiqadnan; Iraq	Frederic Langwagen; Denmark
Elite Male 91 kg	Mirzamukhamedov Jasur; Uzbekistan	Sawgiqadnan; Iraq	Colic Tommy; Croatia
Elite Male 91+ kg	Strucl Rok; Slovenia	Bagirov Eldor; Uzbekistan	
