= 2015 IFMA World Cup =

The IFMA Royal World Cup 2015 was held from 13 to 23 August 2015 in Bangkok, Thailand.

== Elite A ==
=== Men's events ===
Event	Gold	Silver	Bronze
Elite Male 48 kg	Phromduea Suepphong; Thailand	Mark Rolinskyi; Ukraine	Fernandez Maico; Philippines
Elite Male 48 kg	Phromduea Suepphong; Thailand	Mark Rolinskyi; Ukraine	Bogdanov Evgnii; Russia
Elite Male 51 kg	Phonkrathok Arnon; Thailand	Roman Vagilevych; Ukraine	Kaldybayev Rauan; Kazakhstan
Elite Male 51 kg	Phonkrathok Arnon; Thailand	Roman Vagilevych; Ukraine	Hoang Giang; Sweden
Elite Male 54 kg	Loungphon Thachtana; Thailand	Eduard Michovich; Belarus	Mussin Ilyas; Kazakhstan
Elite Male 54 kg	Loungphon Thachtana; Thailand	Eduard Michovich; Belarus	Ariba Boubkar; Morocco
Elite Male 57 kg	Comta Vewart; Thailand	Kostiantyn Trishyn; Ukraine	Galiyev Ishan; Kazakhstan
Elite Male 57 kg	Comta Vewart; Thailand	Kostiantyn Trishyn; Ukraine	Valteran Pavel; Russia
Elite Male 60 kg	Sapmanee Ruthaiphan; Thailand	Nabati Kiamran; Russia	Wells Chris; New Zealand
Elite Male 60 kg	Sapmanee Ruthaiphan; Thailand	Nabati Kiamran; Russia	Galiyev Abil; Kazakhstan
Elite Male 63.5 kg	Igor Liubchenko; Ukraine	Guyer Itay; Israel	Polosan Jonathan; Philippines
Elite Male 63.5 kg	Igor Liubchenko; Ukraine	Guyer Itay; Israel	Kaeosikhao Kriangkai; Thailand
Elite Male 67 kg	Zaynukov Magomed; Russia	Staiti Kurt; Australia	Amirzhanov Zhanserik; Kazakhstan
Elite Male 67 kg	Zaynukov Magomed; Russia	Staiti Kurt; Australia	Fueangfu Piya; Thailand
Elite Male 71 kg	Muensang Suppachai; Thailand	Andrei Kulebin; Belarus	Oleksandr Moisa; Ukraine
Elite Male 71 kg	Muensang Suppachai; Thailand	Andrei Kulebin; Belarus	Decagny; France
Elite Male 75 kg	Ngoto Olivier; France	Murtazaev Islam; Russia	Surichay Pattanaphong; Thailand
Elite Male 75 kg	Ngoto Olivier; France	Murtazaev Islam; Russia	Rama Burim; Sweden
Elite Male 81 kg	Dzmitry Valent; Belarus	Iskhakov Nadir; Russia	Paczuski Radoslaw; Poland
Elite Male 81 kg	Dzmitry Valent; Belarus	Iskhakov Nadir; Russia	Santalahti Jussi; Finland
Elite Male 86 kg	Petrosian Armen; Russia	Remijinsz Szkudlarek; Poland	Yauheni Vauchok; Belarus
Elite Male 86 kg	Petrosian Armen; Russia	Remijinsz Szkudlarek; Poland	Berglund Erik; Sweden
Elite Male 91 kg	Vakhitov Artem; Russia	Styben Jakob; Germany	Hopman Zane; New Zealand
Elite Male 91 kg	Vakhitov Artem; Russia	Styben Jakob; Germany	Oleh Pryimachov; Ukraine
Elite Male 91+ kg	Andrei Herasimchuk; Belarus	Kornilov Kirill; Russia	Nirolay Guessev; Kazakhstan
Elite Male 91+ kg	Andrei Herasimchuk; Belarus	Kornilov Kirill; Russia	Tsotne Rogava; Ukraine

=== Women's events ===
Event	Gold	Silver	Bronze
Elite Female 45 kg	Konklak Suphisara; Thailand	Alena Liashkevich; Belarus	Comert Yasemin; Turkey
Elite Female 45 kg	Konklak Suphisara; Thailand	Alena Liashkevich; Belarus	Urpulahti Pia; Finland
Elite Female 48 kg	Hanphan Rattanaphon; Thailand	Thanh Truc Nguyen Thi; Vietnam	Akarsu Gizem; Turkey
Elite Female 48 kg	Hanphan Rattanaphon; Thailand	Thanh Truc Nguyen Thi; Vietnam	Kakkonen Tessa; Finland
Elite Female 51 kg	Padpho Parita; Thailand	Djedidi Muriame; France	Armstrong Kristan; Australia
Elite Female 51 kg	Padpho Parita; Thailand	Djedidi Muriame; France	Gunnarsson Therese; Sweden
Elite Female 54 kg	Olofsson Sofia; Sweden	Aho Andra; Estonia	Tsang Hoi Lan; Hong Kong
Elite Female 54 kg	Olofsson Sofia; Sweden	Aho Andra; Estonia	Likittrakul Sopapan; Thailand
Elite Female 57 kg	Semail Katia; France	Wikner Evelina; Sweden	Miriam Tio; New Zealand
Elite Female 57 kg	Semail Katia; France	Wikner Evelina; Sweden	Schmidt Yolanda; Australia
Elite Female 60 kg	Shevchenko Valentina; Peru	Mariya Valent; Belarus	Bengtsson Sandra; Sweden
Elite Female 60 kg	Shevchenko Valentina; Peru	Mariya Valent; Belarus	Van Gestel Anke; Belgium
Elite Female 63.5 kg	Anderson Melissa; Australia	Shevchenko Antonina; Peru	Lawant Aleide Jans Judith; Netherlands
Elite Female 63.5 kg	Anderson Melissa; Australia	Shevchenko Antonina; Peru	Vinnikova Svetlana; Russia
Elite Female 67 kg	Nepianidi Anastasiia; Russia	Tidblad Keskikangas Isa; Sweden	Kolesnik Elena; Ukraine
Elite Female 67 kg	Nepianidi Anastasiia; Russia	Tidblad Keskikangas Isa; Sweden	Downs Melody; New Zealand
Elite Female 71 kg	Glew Steph; Australia	Tarasova Anna; Russia	Nilsson Elina; Sweden
Elite Female 71 kg	Glew Steph; Australia	Tarasova Anna; Russia	Tana Te Huia Aroha Lee; New Zealand
Elite Female 75 kg	Laressa Van Emden; Finland	Ivas Andreja; Croatia	Strandberg Anna; Sweden
Elite Female 75 kg	Laressa Van Emden; Finland	Ivas Andreja; Croatia	Larionova Irina; Russia

=== Elite B ===
Event	Gold	Silver	Bronze
Elite Male 45 kg	Sorachat Janncal; Thailand	Gangadharaiah Rajesh; India	Thomas McCarthy; Wales
Elite Male 48 kg	Haidary Ibrahem; Afghanistan	Lu Jinfeng; Hong Kong	Kuralbayev Abylay; Kazakhstan
Elite Male 48 kg	Haidary Ibrahem; Afghanistan	Lu Jinfeng; Hong Kong	Kizilkaya Durmus; Turkey
Elite Male 51 kg	Abdullah; Afghanistan	Jeri Yulianus Jefri; Indonesia	Espinosa Joseph; United States
Elite Male 51 kg	Abdullah; Afghanistan	Jeri Yulianus Jefri; Indonesia	Tang Wing Pan Gary; Hong Kong
Elite Male 54 kg	Shohruz; Uzbekistan	Shaar Yos; Israel	Medalha Fabio; Brazil
Elite Male 54 kg	Shohruz; Uzbekistan	Shaar Yos; Israel	Kwok Wai Hon; Hong Kong
Elite Male 57 kg	El Hamdou Quentin; France	Jahangir Mohammad Yosaf; Afghanistan	Daffar; Sweden
Elite Male 57 kg	El Hamdou Quentin; France	Jahangir Mohammad Yosaf; Afghanistan	Takahiro Tatsumi; Japan
Elite Male 60 kg	Wang Wenfeng; China	Lorenzo Guillaume; France	Baillie Shaun; Canada
Elite Male 60 kg	Wang Wenfeng; China	Lorenzo Guillaume; France	Oleksandr Kolontai; Ukraine
Elite Male 63.5 kg	Ghaljaie Jawad; Afghanistan	Bobur Juraev; Uzbekistan	Raiymbek Sembek; Kazakhstan
Elite Male 63.5 kg	Ghaljaie Jawad; Afghanistan	Bobur Juraev; Uzbekistan	Sirbu Dmitry; Moldova
Elite Male 67 kg	Yuan Bing; China	Nurullaev Jurabek; Uzbekistan	Mackillop Matthew; Canada
Elite Male 67 kg	Yuan Bing; China	Nurullaev Jurabek; Uzbekistan	Kart Caner; Turkey
Elite Male 71 kg	Njiba Dany; France	Andersson Magnus; Sweden	Dzharimov Aidamir; Russia
Elite Male 71 kg	Njiba Dany; France	Andersson Magnus; Sweden	Mazzetti Gabriel; Peru
Elite Male 75 kg	Jones Troy; United States	Ceken Osman; Turkey	Aittainoun; Finland
Elite Male 75 kg	Jones Troy; United States	Ceken Osman; Turkey	Mackenzie Jacob; Canada
Elite Male 81 kg	El Felak Aziz; Morocco	Juyden; Australia	Greisiger Jan; Czech Republic
Elite Male 81 kg	El Felak Aziz; Morocco	Juyden; Australia	Veselkin Sergei; Russia
Elite Male 86 kg	Riad Azouagh; Morocco	Kose Olcay; Turkey	Nemi Stephane; France
Elite Male 86 kg	Riad Azouagh; Morocco	Kose Olcay; Turkey	Lo Timothy; Canada
Elite Male 91 kg	Kuyken Levi; Belgium	Shergold Nolan; Canada	Murat Umarov; Tajikistan
Elite Male 91+ kg	Sazontsev; Russia	Hussain Moa; New Zealand	Boomdume; Bulgaria
Elite Male 91+ kg	Sazontsev; Russia	Hussain Moa; New Zealand	Oly Yves Roland; Ivory Coast
