= 2016 IFMA World Muaythai Championships =

2016 World Muaythai Championships

The 2016 IFMA World Muaythai Championships is the 17th edition of the IFMA World Muaythai Championships. The competition are held from May 19 to May 28, 2016, in Jönköping, Sweden

== Medalists ==
=== Female junior events ===
Event	Gold	Silver	Bronze
42 kg	Jessa Rivera; Philippines	Nadya Indah; Indonesia	—
45 kg	Rudzma Abubakar; Philippines	Novita Anqqiayanni; Indonesia	—
51 kg	Ines Pilutti; France	Britney Dolheguy; Australia	Nastassia Runets; Belarus
51 kg	Ines Pilutti; France	Britney Dolheguy; Australia	Sanni Nurminen; Finland
57 kg	Dakota Ditcheva; Great Britain	Rosin Leonie; New Zealand	Nagore Toledo; Spain
57 kg	Dakota Ditcheva; Great Britain	Rosin Leonie; New Zealand	Regan Berry; Australia
60 kg	Anne Martens; Netherlands	Mariana Ramirez; Mexico	Viktoriia Sidorova; Russia

=== Male junior events ===
Event	Gold	Silver	Bronze
45 kg	Alexander Chavez; Peru	Berdon Ghen Yhan; Philippines	Tomas Scarfone; Canada
45 kg	Alexander Chavez; Peru	Berdon Ghen Yhan; Philippines	Aleksey Magdeyev; Kazakhstan
48 kg	Aliaksei Uzvarau; Belarus	Lauge Petersen; Denmark	Luka Shonia; Georgia
54 kg	Daren Rolland; France	Martin Mansilla; Peru	Tangatacou Adzhalan; Russia
54 kg	Daren Rolland; France	Martin Mansilla; Peru	Kernozhyiski; Belarus
57 kg	Valovich Mark; Russia	Samuel Ducoutumany; France	Saifullah Bin; Malaysia
57 kg	Valovich Mark; Russia	Samuel Ducoutumany; France	Marco Antonio; Peru
60 kg	Pavel Hryshanovich; Belarus	Matej Trcka; Czech Republic	Daniil Gayduk; Estonia
60 kg	Pavel Hryshanovich; Belarus	Matej Trcka; Czech Republic	Gaspard Meric; France
63.5 kg	Adam Larfi; Algeria	Vaclav Sivak; Czech Republic	Andrei Chyhileichyk; Belarus
67 kg	Nikolay Samussev; Kazakhstan	Alexis Laugeois; France	Uladzislau Rahalevich; Belarus
67 kg	Nikolay Samussev; Kazakhstan	Alexis Laugeois; France	Yasser Adounis; Tunisia
71 kg	Kiryl Kavaliou; Belarus	Dmitrii Changeliia; Russia	Andres Oitsar; Estonia
71 kg	Kiryl Kavaliou; Belarus	Dmitrii Changeliia; Russia	Andreas Cehovsky; Czech Republic
75 kg	Ayan Tazhanov; Kazakhstan	Tim Schlapbach; Switzerland	Mikita Shostak; Belarus
86 kg	Gadzhiev Magomed; Russia	Ante Bilic; Croatia	—

=== Female Senior A events ===
Event	Gold	Silver	Bronze
45 kg	Alena Liashkevich; Belarus	Suphisara Konlak; Thailand	Camilla Danielsson; Sweden
45 kg	Alena Liashkevich; Belarus	Suphisara Konlak; Thailand	Vara Negodina; Russia
48 kg	Tessa Kakkonen; Finland	Maggie Tucker; Canada	Gizem Akarsu; Turkey
48 kg	Tessa Kakkonen; Finland	Maggie Tucker; Canada	Truc Nguyen Thi Thanh; Vietnam
51 kg	Meriem El Moubarik; Morocco	Ly Bui Yen; Vietnam	Nina Schumacher; Germany
51 kg	Meriem El Moubarik; Morocco	Ly Bui Yen; Vietnam	Johanna Rydberg; Sweden
54 kg	Sofia Olofsson; Sweden	Diachkova Natalia; Russia	Juliette Lacroix; France
54 kg	Sofia Olofsson; Sweden	Diachkova Natalia; Russia	Jlhan Baurukkacli; Morocco
57 kg	Patricia Axling; Sweden	Julia Berezikava; Russia	Essi Riihimaki; Finland
57 kg	Patricia Axling; Sweden	Julia Berezikava; Russia	Yolanda Schmidt; Australia
60 kg	Nili Block; Israel	Lryna Chernave; Ukraine	Amandine Falck; France
60 kg	Nili Block; Israel	Lryna Chernave; Ukraine	Ekaterina Vinnikuva; Russia
63.5 kg	Antonina Shevchenko; Peru	Svetlana Vinnikova; Russia	Lydie Matalon; France
63.5 kg	Antonina Shevchenko; Peru	Svetlana Vinnikova; Russia	Kubra Akbulut; Turkey
67 kg	Beata Malecki; Sweden	Bediha Tacyildiz; Turkey	Riikka Jarvenpaa; Finland
67 kg	Beata Malecki; Sweden	Bediha Tacyildiz; Turkey	Kelsey Andries; Canada
71 kg	Anna Strandberg; Sweden	Anna Tarasava; Russia	Hilary Herman; Canada
71 kg	Anna Strandberg; Sweden	Anna Tarasava; Russia	Andreja Ivas; Croatia
75 kg	Anita Boom; Australia	Angela Mamic; Sweden	Christine Doyle; Canada
75 kg	Anita Boom; Australia	Angela Mamic; Sweden	Hela Cuzic; Croatia

=== Male Senior A events ===
Event	Gold	Silver	Bronze
48 kg	Thiwakorn Chobthumkit; Thailand	Yelaman Sayassatov; Kazakhstan	Abbas Abdollahi Arpanahi; Iran
48 kg	Thiwakorn Chobthumkit; Thailand	Yelaman Sayassatov; Kazakhstan	Danil Paramzin; Russia
51 kg	Arnon Phonkrathok; Thailand	Kholmurod Rakhimov; Russia	Nasiri Yengeleh; Iran
51 kg	Arnon Phonkrathok; Thailand	Kholmurod Rakhimov; Russia	Ievgeniy Skliarov; Ukraine
54 kg	Pranom Sung-Ngoen; Thailand	Ilyas Mussin; Kazakhstan	Aslanvek Zikleev; Russia
54 kg	Pranom Sung-Ngoen; Thailand	Ilyas Mussin; Kazakhstan	Vitali Ramanovski; Belarus
57 kg	Wiwat Khamtha; Thailand	Kostiantyn Trishyn; Ukraine	Eduard Mikhovich; Belarus
57 kg	Wiwat Khamtha; Thailand	Kostiantyn Trishyn; Ukraine	Ishan Galiyev; Kazakhstan
60 kg	Ruthaiphan Sapmanee; Thailand	Mykhailo Vasylioglo; Ukraine	Kerem Dincer; Turkey
60 kg	Ruthaiphan Sapmanee; Thailand	Mykhailo Vasylioglo; Ukraine	Pavel Valteran; Russia
63.5 kg	Igor Liubchenko; Ukraine	Vladimir Kuzmin; Russia	Bakar Gelenidze; Georgia
63.5 kg	Igor Liubchenko; Ukraine	Vladimir Kuzmin; Russia	Raman Dounar; Belarus
67 kg	Magomed Zaynukov; Russia	Yutthaphong Sitthichot; Thailand	Surachai Sosom; Finland
67 kg	Magomed Zaynukov; Russia	Yutthaphong Sitthichot; Thailand	Ali Batmaz; Turkey
71 kg	Suppachai Muensang; Thailand	Sean Kearney; Canada	Maghus Andersson; Sweden
71 kg	Suppachai Muensang; Thailand	Sean Kearney; Canada	Andrei Kulebin; Belarus
75 kg	Vital Hurkou; Belarus	Ekkaphan Somboonsab; Thailand	Ali Dogan; Turkey
75 kg	Vital Hurkou; Belarus	Ekkaphan Somboonsab; Thailand	Constantino Nanga; Sweden
81 kg	Dzmitry Valent; Belarus	Surik Magakian; Russia	Anatolii Sukhanov; Ukraine
81 kg	Dzmitry Valent; Belarus	Surik Magakian; Russia	Samuel Dbili; France
86 kg	Anatoliy Vanakov; Belarus	Armen Petrosian; Russia	Daniel Forsberg; Finland
86 kg	Anatoliy Vanakov; Belarus	Armen Petrosian; Russia	Lukasz Radosz; Poland
91 kg	Oleh Pryimachov; Ukraine	Dzianis Hancharonak; Belarus	Majid Fallah; Iran
91 kg	Oleh Pryimachov; Ukraine	Dzianis Hancharonak; Belarus	Arslan Iallyev; Russia
+91 kg	Andrei Herasimchuk; Belarus	Tsotne Rogava; Ukraine	Kirill Kornilov; Russia
+91 kg	Andrei Herasimchuk; Belarus	Tsotne Rogava; Ukraine	Simon Ogolla; Sweden

=== Male Senior B events ===
Event	Gold	Silver	Bronze
48 kg	Nurbolatkozha Omar; Kazakhstan	Tat Fai Yiu; Hong Kong	Duc Le Hoang; Vietnam
48 kg	Nurbolatkozha Omar; Kazakhstan	Tat Fai Yiu; Hong Kong	Gohar Baboyan; Armenia
51 kg	Ishcuk Egor; Russia	Wing Pan Gary Tang; Hong Kong	Mohamad Sala; Iran
51 kg	Ishcuk Egor; Russia	Wing Pan Gary Tang; Hong Kong	Mad Lani; Indonesia
54 kg	Dmitriy Zuyev; Kazakhstan	Bougadir Issam; Morocco	Emrah Atis; Turkey
54 kg	Dmitriy Zuyev; Kazakhstan	Bougadir Issam; Morocco	Chaya Tran; Denmark
57 kg	Saadoun Saad; Morocco	Rustan Bayramduryev; Turkmenistan	Martin Rodriguez; United States
57 kg	Saadoun Saad; Morocco	Rustan Bayramduryev; Turkmenistan	Scarfone Marques; Canada
60 kg	Tran Nguyen; Vietnam	Mirbek Sartkalmakov; Kyrgyzstan	Jaffar Al-Qashaami; Sweden
60 kg	Tran Nguyen; Vietnam	Mirbek Sartkalmakov; Kyrgyzstan	Nait Elghazi Salah-Eddine; Morocco
63.5 kg	Jordan Graham; Canada	Ruben Josue Cruz Aleman; Mexico	Van Dai Vo; Vietnam
63.5 kg	Jordan Graham; Canada	Ruben Josue Cruz Aleman; Mexico	Guler Arif; Turkey
67 kg	Yildirim Oguz; Turkey	Mustafa Saparmyradov; Turkmenistan	Gonzales Lopez Oscar; Mexico
67 kg	Yildirim Oguz; Turkey	Mustafa Saparmyradov; Turkmenistan	Zhanibek Kanatbayev; Kazakhstan
71 kg	Denij Kolotygin; Russia	Baboyin Guillaume; Tunisia	Cameron Web; Australia
71 kg	Denij Kolotygin; Russia	Baboyin Guillaume; Tunisia	Rafael Fiziev; Kyrgyzstan
75 kg	Otabek Ergashev; Sweden	Frederik Winter; Denmark	Heiko Reinhard; Germany
75 kg	Otabek Ergashev; Sweden	Frederik Winter; Denmark	Yongkang Zhang; China
81 kg	Serqey Veselkin; Russia	El Felak Aziz; Morocco	Zach Bunnell; United States
81 kg	Serqey Veselkin; Russia	El Felak Aziz; Morocco	Pavel Karjukin; Estonia
86 kg	Baeu Billbola; Russia	Frederic Fraikin; Germany	Anthony Paterson; Canada
86 kg	Baeu Billbola; Russia	Frederic Fraikin; Germany	Selman Yucel; Turkey
91 kg	Issa Ba; Algeria	Aki Kulmala; Finland	Ameer Abdulrazzao; Iran
+91 kg	Sazontsev Maksim; Russia	Noel Hussey; Canada	Yves Roland Oly; Ivory Coast
+91 kg	Sazontsev Maksim; Russia	Noel Hussey; Canada	Dempsey Wilkins; New Zealand
