= 2009 IFMA World Muaythai Championships =

The 2009 IFMA World Muaythai Championships was held from 27 November to 5 December 2009 in Bangkok, Thailand.

== Medalists ==
=== Elite A ===
Event	Gold	Silver	Bronze
45 kg	Sergiy Chekalov; Ukraine	Davyd Pflyuk; Kazakhstan	
48 kg	Tanes Ongjunta; Thailand	Rauan Kaldybayev; Kazakhstan	Musa Uysal; Turkey
48 kg	Tanes Ongjunta; Thailand	Rauan Kaldybayev; Kazakhstan	Pavel Marozau; Belarus
51 kg	Arnold Khegay; Ukraine	Worapod Macreem; Thailand	Zhanibek Sadvakasov; Kazakhstan
51 kg	Arnold Khegay; Ukraine	Worapod Macreem; Thailand	Cagdas Yikilmaz; Turkey
54 kg	Sattra Paleenarm; Thailand	Andrei Zayats; Belarus	Denis Tyabin; Russia
54 kg	Sattra Paleenarm; Thailand	Andrei Zayats; Belarus	Viet Hoang; Sweden
57 kg	Witsanu Chankhunthod; Thailand	Dzmitry Valstis; Belarus	Ugur Murat Kilic; Turkey
57 kg	Witsanu Chankhunthod; Thailand	Dzmitry Valstis; Belarus	Ruslan Yusubov; Russia
60 kg	Abdullo Hudoybezdiev; Uzbekistan	Chatchapol Petsongsri; Thailand	Artur Isayants; Belarus
60 kg	Abdullo Hudoybezdiev; Uzbekistan	Chatchapol Petsongsri; Thailand	Ramazan Cicek; Turkey
63.5 kg	Panupun Tanjad; Thailand	Martin Ahkter; Sweden	Enriko Gogokhia; Ukraine
63.5 kg	Panupun Tanjad; Thailand	Martin Ahkter; Sweden	Maksim Maruha; Belarus
67 kg	Jeeprasak Inudom; Thailand	Andrei Kulebin; Belarus	Hamza Rahmani; Belgium
67 kg	Jeeprasak Inudom; Thailand	Andrei Kulebin; Belarus	David Teymur; Sweden
71 kg	Vitali Hurkou; Belarus	Almas Smagulov; Kazakhstan	Ilya Grad; Israel
71 kg	Vitali Hurkou; Belarus	Almas Smagulov; Kazakhstan	Petro Nakonechnyi; Ukraine
75 kg	Dzmitry Valent; Belarus	Vasyl Tereshonok; Ukraine	Emil Zoraj; Croatia
75 kg	Dzmitry Valent; Belarus	Vasyl Tereshonok; Ukraine	Youness El Mhssani; Morocco
81 kg	Dzmitry Abdulin; Belarus	Kim Olsen; Australia	Hicham El Gaoui; Morocco
81 kg	Dzmitry Abdulin; Belarus	Kim Olsen; Australia	Asadov Nahid; Azerbaijan
86 kg	Andrei Herasimchuk; Belarus	Javlon Nazarov; Uzbekistan	Ivan Pentka; Russia
86 kg	Andrei Herasimchuk; Belarus	Javlon Nazarov; Uzbekistan	Oleksandr Oliynyk; Ukraine
91 kg	Dzianis Handharonak; Belarus	Tsotne Rogava; Ukraine	Abdoulie Joof; Sweden
91 kg	Dzianis Handharonak; Belarus	Tsotne Rogava; Ukraine	Temirlan Tokaev; Russia
+91 kg	Dmytro Bezus; Ukraine	Nadyr Gadzhiev; Russia	Todor Plamenov Todorov; Bulgaria
+91 kg	Dmytro Bezus; Ukraine	Nadyr Gadzhiev; Russia	Sebastien Van Thielen; Belgium

=== Women's events ===
Event	Gold	Silver	Bronze
Elite Female 45 kg	Marism Abissa; Morocco	Wai Ying Tsang; Hong Kong	Annie Eriksson; Sweden
Elite Female 45 kg	Marism Abissa; Morocco	Wai Ying Tsang; Hong Kong	Hui Theng Nicole Chua; Singapore
Elite Female 48 kg	Olesya Gladkova; Russia	Angelica Falk; Sweden	Emine Duyar; Turkey
Elite Female 48 kg	Olesya Gladkova; Russia	Angelica Falk; Sweden	Chaimaa Rouini; Morocco
Elite Female 51 kg	Jihane Mezyaive; Morocco	Angsana Khamhanpol; Thailand	Katsiaryna Izotava; Belarus
Elite Female 51 kg	Jihane Mezyaive; Morocco	Angsana Khamhanpol; Thailand	Gillberry Santiago Guido; United States
Elite Female 54 kg	Diana Yakovleva; Ukraine	Misty/Dawn Sutherland; Canada	Asmae Ouazri; Morocco
Elite Female 54 kg	Diana Yakovleva; Ukraine	Misty/Dawn Sutherland; Canada	Prakaidao Pramari; Thailand
Elite Female 57 kg	Joanna Jedrzejczyk; Poland	Anna Zucchelli; England	Sunaree Preechakul; Thailand
Elite Female 57 kg	Joanna Jedrzejczyk; Poland	Anna Zucchelli; England	Kate Heuston; Australia
Elite Female 60 kg	Valentina Shevchenko; Peru	Alena Muratava; Belarus	Ania Fucz; Germany
Elite Female 60 kg	Valentina Shevchenko; Peru	Alena Muratava; Belarus	Amanda Kelly; England
Elite Female 63.5 kg	Miriam Nakamoto; United States	Rachida Hilali; Morocco	Jenny Andersson; Sweden
Elite Female 63.5 kg	Miriam Nakamoto; United States	Rachida Hilali; Morocco	Alison Blease; England
Elite Female 67 kg	Sindy Maricic; Australia	Anna Willberg; Finland	Maryia Belush; Belarus
Elite Female 67 kg	Sindy Maricic; Australia	Anna Willberg; Finland	Elina Nilsson; Sweden
Elite Female 71 kg	Charmaine/Lyn Tweet; Canada	Mira Marjamaki; Finland	Haenen Gitte; Belgium
Elite Female 71 kg	Charmaine/Lyn Tweet; Canada	Mira Marjamaki; Finland	Tatiana Ovchinnikova; Russia

=== Elite B ===
Event	Gold	Silver	Bronze
Elite Male 45 kg	Assyl-Bek Baltbay; Kazakhstan	Milhem Mahmoud; Iraq	Shahmi Konyak; India
Elite Male 48 kg	Hasrul Hisham Abdul Aziz; Malaysia	Wai Lun Yeung; Hong Kong	Mussin Didar; Kazakhstan
Elite Male 48 kg	Hasrul Hisham Abdul Aziz; Malaysia	Wai Lun Yeung; Hong Kong	Shahmi Lonyak; India
Elite Male 51 kg	Wingban Tang; Hong Kong	Ulf Byman; Sweden	Mohd Nazarudin Che; Malaysia
Elite Male 54 kg	Saif Adden/Khalid Zakzook; Jordan	Farid Garayev; Azerbaijan	Guy Lazarus; South Africa
Elite Male 54 kg	Saif Adden/Khalid Zakzook; Jordan	Farid Garayev; Azerbaijan	Brodie Stewart Stalder; Australia
Elite Male 57 kg	Michael Perez; Canada	Vitalii Lisniak; Ukraine	Jason Andrada; United States
Elite Male 57 kg	Michael Perez; Canada	Vitalii Lisniak; Ukraine	Luke Aram; Australia
Elite Male 60 kg	Eric Alejandro Luna; United States	Sofiane Bougossa; France	Stanislav Perzhanovsk; Ukraine
Elite Male 60 kg	Eric Alejandro Luna; United States	Sofiane Bougossa; France	Avdeliuhed 'Appie' Mouhdad; Netherlands
Elite Male 63.5 kg	Sanny Dahiback; Sweden	Emil Umayev; Kazakhstan	Ponce Antonio; Spain
Elite Male 63.5 kg	Sanny Dahiback; Sweden	Emil Umayev; Kazakhstan	Nosredine Adad; France
Elite Male 67 kg	Ruel Copeland; Canada	Jun-Heor Son; South Korea	Ali Elameri; Spain
Elite Male 71 kg	Adel Jawad Abdulkadhim Al-Jbara; Iraq	Ruskitaly Balint; Hungary	Prter/Amos Arbeau; Canada
Elite Male 71 kg	Adel Jawad Abdulkadhim Al-Jbara; Iraq	Ruskitaly Balint; Hungary	Nabil Boujenan; France
Elite Male 75 kg	Tagir Magomedov; Russia	Amadou N-Diaye; France	Sean/Paul Mckinnon; Canada
Elite Male 75 kg	Tagir Magomedov; Russia	Amadou N-Diaye; France	Daniel Kim; United States
Elite Male 81 kg	Muradov Raim; Kazakhstan	Meran Zangana; Sweden	Hamish Turton; New Zealand
Elite Male 81 kg	Muradov Raim; Kazakhstan	Meran Zangana; Sweden	Angelo Aristodimou; Cyprus
Elite Male 86 kg	Adam Lazerevic; Sweden	Thomas Alizer; France	Muntadher K. Mohsin; Iraq
Elite Male 86 kg	Adam Lazerevic; Sweden	Thomas Alizer; France	Hemanth Kumar; India
Elite Male 91 kg	Tawreeq Adnan Abd; Iraq	Daniel Jean-Michel; Canada	Andles Salas; United States
Elite Male 91 kg	Tawreeq Adnan Abd; Iraq	Daniel Jean-Michel; Canada	Yusuf Ibragimov; Uzbekistan
Elite Male +91 kg	Andrei Bokan; Estonia	Wilfried Hoareau; France	Simon Ronen; Israel
Elite Male +91 kg	Andrei Bokan; Estonia	Wilfried Hoareau; France	Knowles Lyndon; England

=== Junior ===
Event	Gold	Silver	Bronze
Junior Male 40 kg	Aliaksel Nalibaika; Belarus	Magomedsaid Arslanov; Russia	Vitalit Sokolov; Ukraine
Junior Male 40 kg	Aliaksel Nalibaika; Belarus	Magomedsaid Arslanov; Russia	Jaden Martin; New Zealand
Junior Male 45 kg	Denys Buch; Ukraine	Rasul Khazbulatov; Russia	Colmek Maremdu Kabui; India
Junior Male 45 kg	Denys Buch; Ukraine	Rasul Khazbulatov; Russia	Lskhar Khassanov; Kazakhstan
Junior Male 48 kg	Linno Tak; Australia	Gulomjon Khalimov; Uzbekistan	Linno Tak; Australia
Junior Male 48 kg	Linno Tak; Australia	Gulomjon Khalimov; Uzbekistan	Mahmut Erdem; Turkey
Junior Male 51 kg	Igor Monastyrskyy; Ukraine	Demokan Bostan; Turkey	Kirill Tuzovskiy; Russia
Junior Male 51 kg	Igor Monastyrskyy; Ukraine	Demokan Bostan; Turkey	Siarhel Mukha; Belarus
Junior Male 54 kg	Orhan Erden; Turkey	Artem Avanesov; Belarus	Roel Alvarado; United States
Junior Male 54 kg	Orhan Erden; Turkey	Artem Avanesov; Belarus	Ramil Mustafaev; Russia
Junior Male 57 kg	Vedat Uruc; Turkey	Ngai Chung Chin; Hong Kong	Gyeone-Wan Kim; South Korea
Junior Male 57 kg	Vedat Uruc; Turkey	Ngai Chung Chin; Hong Kong	Ameer Ibrahim Abdulrazzaq; Iraq
Junior Male 60 kg	Gokhan Kilic; Turkey	Kiryl Marchanka; Belarus	Mathias Gallo; Italy
Junior Male 60 kg	Gokhan Kilic; Turkey	Kiryl Marchanka; Belarus	Viet Pham; England
Junior Male 63.5 kg	Ahanes Safaran; Belarus	Rafael Fiziev; Kyrgyzstan	Saykhan Apeaev; Latvia
Junior Male 63.5 kg	Ahanes Safaran; Belarus	Rafael Fiziev; Kyrgyzstan	Alexander Rivero Munoz; Spain
Junior Male 67 kg	Yurik Davtyan; Russia	Dolev Barak; Israel	Damirjon Khamidov; Uzbekistan
Junior Male 67 kg	Yurik Davtyan; Russia	Dolev Barak; Israel	Siarhei Ivanou; Belarus
Junior Male 71 kg	Ihor Toryanyk; Ukraine	Arutyun Taghmazayan; Russia	Royal Namazov; Belarus
Junior Male 71 kg	Ihor Toryanyk; Ukraine	Arutyun Taghmazayan; Russia	Husniddin Mahmudov; Uzbekistan
Junior Male 75 kg	Vladyslav Koshel'; Ukraine	Shahboz Azimov; Uzbekistan	Ghaith Aliadnan; Iraq
Junior Male 75 kg	Vladyslav Koshel'; Ukraine	Shahboz Azimov; Uzbekistan	Nathan Jones; New Zealand
Junior Male 81 kg	Rasym Abdulin; Ukraine	Shota Javakhia; Georgia	Pedro De Souza; Brazil
Junior Male 81 kg	Rasym Abdulin; Ukraine	Shota Javakhia; Georgia	Tyler/Jason Kennedy; Canada
Junior Male 86 kg	Grigor Matevossyan; Russia	Leonid Kogan; Ukraine	

Event	Gold	Silver	Bronze
48 kg	Sibel Akhan; Turkey	Alisa Markovskaya; Russia	Shakhriza Khalilova; Kyrgyzstan
48 kg	Sibel Akhan; Turkey	Alisa Markovskaya; Russia	Litsenko Kateryna; Ukraine
51 kg	Amy Wendy Robertson Pirnie; Scotland	Christina Jurjevic; Australia	Uliyana Sitnikova; Russia
54 kg	Gizem Islam; Turkey	Natalia Diazkova; Russia	
57 kg	Magdalena Rak; Poland	Yana Albrekht; Russia	
60 kg	Gulizar Kara; Turkey	Irina Belousova; Russia	
63.5 kg	Sina Hofman; Netherlands	Anastasia Vasileva; Russia	
