= 2017 IFMA World Muaythai Championships =

The 2017 IFMA World Muaythai Championships was the 16th edition of the IFMA World Muaythai Championships. It was held in Minsk, Belarus, from 3 to 12 May 2017.

== Competitive Class ==
Event	Gold	Silver	Bronze
Competitive class male 45 kg	Magdeev Alexey; Kazakhstan	Mahesh Kumar; India	
Competitive class male 48 kg	Duc Le Hoang; Vietnam	Arifkhanov Bakytzhan; Kazakhstan	Pajaron Jojie; Philippines
Competitive class male 48 kg	Duc Le Hoang; Vietnam	Arifkhanov Bakytzhan; Kazakhstan	Yiu Tat Fai; Hong Kong
Competitive class male 51 kg	Luo Chenghao; China	Kopylov Pavel; Russia	Berke Karabostan; Turkey
Competitive class male 51 kg	Luo Chenghao; China	Kopylov Pavel; Russia	Zhengis Didav; Kazakhstan
Competitive Class Male 54 kg	Rakhimov Kholmurod; Russia	Pineda Emilio; United States	Young Nicolas; Peru
Competitive Class Male 54 kg	Rakhimov Kholmurod; Russia	Pineda Emilio; United States	Tran Chaya; Denmark
Competitive Class Male 57 kg	Sarsembekov Almaz; Kazakhstan	Cabello Joseph; Peru	Carranza Gomez Genaro; Mexico
Competitive Class Male 57 kg	Sarsembekov Almaz; Kazakhstan	Cabello Joseph; Peru	Nguyen Tang Quyen; Vietnam
Competitive class male 60 kg	Nguyen Tran Duy Nhat; Vietnam	Arslan Murat; Turkey	Vinnik Artsem; Belarus
Competitive class male 60 kg	Nguyen Tran Duy Nhat; Vietnam	Arslan Murat; Turkey	Gazitov Stanislav; Russia
Competitive Class Male 63.5 kg	Petkevich Maksim; Belarus	Sultanishvili Tsotne; Georgia	Cruz Aleman Josue; Mexico
Competitive Class Male 63.5 kg	Petkevich Maksim; Belarus	Sultanishvili Tsotne; Georgia	Oubahammou Mehdi; Morocco
Competitive class male 67 kg	Escuza Ian; Peru	Dounar Raman; Belarus	Kosykh Sergey; Russia
Competitive class male 67 kg	Escuza Ian; Peru	Dounar Raman; Belarus	Mevlana Altintas; Turkey
Competitive class male 71 kg	Filipau Dzmitry; Belarus	Skvortsov Alexander; Russia	Sergma Ayoub-Sadam; Algeria
Competitive class male 71 kg	Filipau Dzmitry; Belarus	Skvortsov Alexander; Russia	Neftaliyev Namik; Kazakhstan
Competitive class male 75 kg	Noritsin Ilya; Russia	Jasiunas Martynas; Lithuania	Al-Tekreeti Mustafa; Iraq
Competitive class male 75 kg	Noritsin Ilya; Russia	Jasiunas Martynas; Lithuania	Osman Ceken; Turkey
Competitive class male 81 kg	Iskhakov Nadir; Russia	Karen Tumasian; Belarus	Oguz Seker; Turkey
Competitive class male 81 kg	Iskhakov Nadir; Russia	Karen Tumasian; Belarus	Monfort Victor; Spain
Competitive class male 86 kg	Fraikin Frederic; Germany	Ceva Matthieu; France	Pavel Lozicki; Israel
Competitive class male 91 kg	Serdar Eroglu; Turkey	Elkassem Wasim; Sweden	Elyacoubi Elkhayoubi; Morocco
Competitive class male 91 kg	Serdar Eroglu; Turkey	Elkassem Wasim; Sweden	Thompson Luke; Australia
Competitive class male +91 kg	Derjaoui Mohamed; Morocco	Vladislav Sheitko; Belarus	Pranav Shankar; India
Competitive class male +91 kg	Derjaoui Mohamed; Morocco	Vladislav Sheitko; Belarus	Said Mamadzade; Azerbaijan

== Elite A ==
=== Women's events ===
Event	Gold	Silver	Bronze
Elite female 45 kg	Liashkevich Alena; Belarus	Negodina Vera; Russia	Belouarrate Oumaima; Morocco
Elite female 45 kg	Liashkevich Alena; Belarus	Negodina Vera; Russia	Mykkanen Satu; Finland
Elite female 48 kg	Konlak Suphisara; Thailand	Chyslova Liudmila; Belarus	Mahfoud Meriame; Morocco
Elite Female 51 kg	Koson Apasara; Thailand	Moubarik Meriem; Morocco	Kuzawinska Gabriela; Poland
Elite Female 51 kg	Koson Apasara; Thailand	Moubarik Meriem; Morocco	Todd Janet; United States
Elite Female 54 kg	Drozdova Valeriya; Russia	Bourakkadi Ilham; Morocco	Lacroix Juliette; France
Elite Female 54 kg	Drozdova Valeriya; Russia	Bourakkadi Ilham; Morocco	Lindgren Knutsson Josefin; Sweden
Elite Female 57 kg	Axling Patricia; Sweden	Jimenez Erin; United States	Wihantamma Ratchadaphon; Thailand
Elite Female 57 kg	Axling Patricia; Sweden	Jimenez Erin; United States	Meltem Bas; Turkey
Elite Female 60 kg	Nili Block; Israel	Nepianidi Anastasiia; Russia	Winberg Gia; Finland
Elite Female 60 kg	Nili Block; Israel	Nepianidi Anastasiia; Russia	Van Der Molen Antje Elisabeth; Peru
Elite Female 63.5 kg	Vinnikova Svetlana; Russia	Bjornestrand Erica; Sweden	Shevchenko Antonina; Peru
Elite Female 63.5 kg	Vinnikova Svetlana; Russia	Bjornestrand Erica; Sweden	Tita Naoil; France
Elite Female 67 kg	Behiye Tacyizdiz; Turkey	Strandberg Anna; Sweden	Sobal Veranika; Belarus
Elite Female 67 kg	Behiye Tacyizdiz; Turkey	Strandberg Anna; Sweden	Riikka Jarvenpaa; Finland
Elite Female 71 kg	Tarasova Anna; Russia	Mamic Angela; Sweden	Filippou Eleonora; Cyprus
Elite Female 71 kg	Tarasova Anna; Russia	Mamic Angela; Sweden	Ivas Andreja; Croatia
Elite Female 75 kg	Larionova Irina; Russia	Srinivasa Ramanujam; India	Belush Maria; Belarus
Elite Female 75 kg	Larionova Irina; Russia	Srinivasa Ramanujam; India	Songul Kucuktes; Turkey
Elite female 75+ kg	Yemialyanava Dziyana; Belarus	Rabia Akdemniz; Turkey	Lesley Data; Belgium
Elite female 75+ kg	Yemialyanava Dziyana; Belarus	Rabia Akdemniz; Turkey	Sebenik Bojana; Slovenia

=== Men's events ===
Event	Gold	Silver	Bronze
Elite Male 48 kg	Chobthumkit Thiwakorn; Thailand	Barin Zubeyr; Turkey	Bulanov Rustam; Russia
Elite Male 48 kg	Chobthumkit Thiwakorn; Thailand	Barin Zubeyr; Turkey	Sardarian Morteza; Iran
Elite Male 51 kg	Phonkrathok Arnon; Thailand	Yelaman Sayassatov; Kazakhstan	Zheliev Danylo; Ukraine
Elite Male 51 kg	Phonkrathok Arnon; Thailand	Yelaman Sayassatov; Kazakhstan	Gasanov Sagiph; Belarus
Elite Male 54 kg	Kokkratchai Chotichanin; Thailand	Zikreev Aslanbek; Russia	Botelho Rui; Portugal
Elite Male 54 kg	Kokkratchai Chotichanin; Thailand	Zikreev Aslanbek; Russia	Sviadomski Mikalai; Belarus
Elite Male 57 kg	Khamtha Wiwat; Thailand	Abramov Aleksandr; Russia	Trishyn Kostiantyn; Ukraine
Elite Male 57 kg	Khamtha Wiwat; Thailand	Abramov Aleksandr; Russia	Yosef Sahar; Israel
Elite Male 60 kg	Chilnak Prawit; Thailand	Waldt Filiph; Sweden	Erden Orhan; Turkey
Elite Male 60 kg	Chilnak Prawit; Thailand	Waldt Filiph; Sweden	Vasylioglo Mykhailo; Ukraine
Elite Male 63.5 kg	Artem Avanesov; Belarus	Itay Guyer; Israel	Kuzmin Vladimir; Russia
Elite Male 63.5 kg	Artem Avanesov; Belarus	Itay Guyer; Israel	Liubchenko Igor; Ukraine
Elite Male 67 kg	Varats Dzmitry; Belarus	Samchaiyaphum Mana; Thailand	Huta Oleh; Ukraine
Elite Male 67 kg	Varats Dzmitry; Belarus	Samchaiyaphum Mana; Thailand	Zaynakov Magomed; Russia
Elite Male 71 kg	Muensang Suppachai; Thailand	Vadim Vaskov; Belarus	Sorokin Vasyl; Ukraine
Elite Male 71 kg	Muensang Suppachai; Thailand	Vadim Vaskov; Belarus	Habib Abdallah; Sweden
Elite Male 75 kg	Grigoryev Ivan; Russia	Calado Diogo; Portugal	Loparev Vadim; Kazakhstan
Elite Male 75 kg	Grigoryev Ivan; Russia	Calado Diogo; Portugal	Valancius Vaidas; Lithuania
Elite Male 81 kg	Valent Dzmitry; Belarus	Glompan Saranon; Thailand	Hashem Beigi Majid; Iran
Elite Male 81 kg	Valent Dzmitry; Belarus	Glompan Saranon; Thailand	Karpych Rostyslav; Ukraine
Elite Male 86 kg	Vauchok Yevheni; Belarus	Sartakov Mikhail; Russia	Lo Timothy; Canada
Elite Male 86 kg	Vauchok Yevheni; Belarus	Sartakov Mikhail; Russia	Aurel Ignat; Moldova
Elite Male 91 kg	Hancharonak Dzianis; Belarus	Klauda Jakub; Czech Republic	Karimian Sina; Iran
Elite Male 91 kg	Hancharonak Dzianis; Belarus	Klauda Jakub; Czech Republic	Styben Jakob; Germany
Elite Male 91+ kg	Rogava Tsotne; Ukraine	Azizpour Arallou Iraj; Iran	Andrei Herasimchuk; Belarus
Elite Male 91+ kg	Rogava Tsotne; Ukraine	Azizpour Arallou Iraj; Iran	Ogolla Simon; Sweden
