= 2014 IFMA World Muaythai Championships =

The 2014 IFMA World Muaythai Championships was held from 1 to 10 May 2014 in Langkawi, Malaysia.

== Medalists ==
=== Elite A ===
Men's events

Event	Gold	Silver	Bronze
Elite Male 45 kg	Zhmakov Vladislav; Russia	Parmehr Yaser; Iran	
Elite Male 48 kg	Phonkrathok Arnon; Thailand	Guta Oleg; Ukraine	Le Hoang Duc; Vietnam
Elite Male 48 kg	Phonkrathok Arnon; Thailand	Guta Oleg; Ukraine	Rakhimov Kholmurod; Russia
Elite Male 51 kg	Charoenroy Kittiphong; Thailand	Tulabaev Kobilbek; Uzbekistan	Hoang Dinh Giang; Sweden
Elite Male 51 kg	Charoenroy Kittiphong; Thailand	Tulabaev Kobilbek; Uzbekistan	Skiba Siarhei; Belarus
Elite Male 54 kg	Wongsa Preecha; Thailand	Yuldashev Jakhangir; Uzbekistan	Delarmino Phillip; Philippines
Elite Male 54 kg	Wongsa Preecha; Thailand	Yuldashev Jakhangir; Uzbekistan	Mykytas Vladyslav; Ukraine
Elite Male 57 kg	Sapmanee Ruthaiphan; Thailand	Abramov Aleksandr; Russia	Zayats Andrei; Belarus
Elite Male 57 kg	Sapmanee Ruthaiphan; Thailand	Abramov Aleksandr; Russia	Zarinfar Ali; Iran
Elite Male 60 kg	Thoetkiat Suwat; Thailand	Azerbiev Murat; Belarus	Bougmza Hamza; Sweden
Elite Male 60 kg	Thoetkiat Suwat; Thailand	Azerbiev Murat; Belarus	Kiamran Nabati; Russia
Elite Male 63.5 kg	Liubchenko Igor; Ukraine	Varats Dzmitry; Belarus	Polosan Jonathan; Philippines
Elite Male 63.5 kg	Liubchenko Igor; Ukraine	Varats Dzmitry; Belarus	Arduini Andrea; Italy
Elite Male 67 kg	Kulebin Andrei; Belarus	Batmaz Ali; Turkey	Magomed Zaynukov; Russia
Elite Male 67 kg	Kulebin Andrei; Belarus	Batmaz Ali; Turkey	Somwang Sittisak; Thailand
Elite Male 71 kg	Glompan Saranon; Thailand	Ineshin Timur; Russia	Akzhanov Rustem; Kazakhstan
Elite Male 71 kg	Glompan Saranon; Thailand	Ineshin Timur; Russia	Minaei Masoud; Iran
Elite Male 75 kg	Ramriangrobpong Somchai; Thailand	Staszczak Oskar; Poland	Khuzin Konstantin; Russia
Elite Male 75 kg	Ramriangrobpong Somchai; Thailand	Staszczak Oskar; Poland	Nikiforov Vitalii; Ukraine
Elite Male 81 kg	Valent Dmitry; Belarus	Magakian Surik; Russia	Issa Yosset; Sweden
Elite Male 81 kg	Valent Dmitry; Belarus	Magakian Surik; Russia	Aygun Mehmet; Turkey
Elite Male 86 kg	Remyha Yaroslav; Ukraine	Mackinnon Mark Joseph; Canada	Sasnouski Artsem; Belarus
Elite Male 86 kg	Remyha Yaroslav; Ukraine	Mackinnon Mark Joseph; Canada	Kugaevskiy Maxim; Russia
Elite Male 91 kg	Dzianis Hancharonak; Belarus	Pentka Ivan; Russia	Barone Emidio; Italy
Elite Male 91 kg	Dzianis Hancharonak; Belarus	Pentka Ivan; Russia	Langawagen Frederic Fredy; Denmark
Elite Male 91+ kg	Kudzin Aliaksei; Belarus	Toshpolatov Jobir; Uzbekistan	Shelepov Semen; Russia
Elite Male 91+ kg	Kudzin Aliaksei; Belarus	Toshpolatov Jobir; Uzbekistan	Rogava Tsotne; Ukraine

=== Women's events ===
Event	Gold	Silver	Bronze
Elite Female 45 kg	Saejao Monruedee; Thailand	Liashkievich Alena; Belarus	Truc Nguyen; Vietnam
Elite Female 45 kg	Saejao Monruedee; Thailand	Liashkievich Alena; Belarus	Fuller Louise; New Zealand
Elite Female 48 kg	Karinki Susan; Sweden	Medina Sarai; Spain	Onar Sukean Tesa; Turkey
Elite Female 48 kg	Karinki Susan; Sweden	Medina Sarai; Spain	Zinovieva Natalia; Russia
Elite Female 51 kg	Ly Bui Yen; Vietnam	Tiken Funda; Turkey	Suhonen Jonna Maria; Finland
Elite Female 51 kg	Ly Bui Yen; Vietnam	Tiken Funda; Turkey	Djedidi Nyrjame; France
Elite Female 54 kg	Ovescena Kizhnerova; Russia	Brereton Christi Coral; Great Britain	Olofsson Sofia; Sweden
Elite Female 54 kg	Ovescena Kizhnerova; Russia	Brereton Christi Coral; Great Britain	Saoto Miss; Thailand
Elite Female 57 kg	Wihantamna Miss; Thailand	Berezikova Yuliya; Russia	Visschers Nathalie; Belgium
Elite Female 57 kg	Wihantamna Miss; Thailand	Berezikova Yuliya; Russia	Lyn Janice Christin; Canada
Elite Female 60 kg	Shevchenko Valentina; Peru	Valent Mariya; Belarus	Macalay Janice Lynn; Canada
Elite Female 60 kg	Shevchenko Valentina; Peru	Valent Mariya; Belarus	De Beer Jacqueline; South Africa
Elite Female 63.5 kg	Shevchenko Antonina; Peru	Anderson Melissa; Australia	Jarvenpaa Riikka Hannele; Finland
Elite Female 63.5 kg	Shevchenko Antonina; Peru	Anderson Melissa; Australia	Bjornestrand Leahey; Sweden
Elite Female 67 kg	Andries Kelsey; Canada	Nepianidi Anastasiya; Russia	Bjorklund Heidi; Finland
Elite Female 67 kg	Andries Kelsey; Canada	Nepianidi Anastasiya; Russia	Perry Melissa; Australia
Elite Female 71 kg	Glew Stephanie; Australia	Jurisic Helena; Croatia	Farih Sabah; Morocco
Elite Female 71 kg	Glew Stephanie; Australia	Jurisic Helena; Croatia	Nilsson Elina; Sweden
Elite Female 75 kg	Tidblad Isa; Sweden	Belush Maria; Belarus	Ivas Andreia; Croatia
Elite Female 75 kg	Tidblad Isa; Sweden	Belush Maria; Belarus	Niemi Elda; Finland

=== Elite B ===
Event	Gold	Silver	Bronze
Elite Male 48 kg	Da Mata Helder; Portugal	Lu Jinfeng; Hong Kong	Mohamad Farid Mohd Baki; Malaysia
Elite Male 48 kg	Da Mata Helder; Portugal	Lu Jinfeng; Hong Kong	Zuyev Dmitriy; Kazakhstan
Elite Male 51 kg	Mohd Lokman Mat Roji; Malaysia	Boulasdal Farid; Morocco	Battbootti Ali Mahmood; Iraq
Elite Male 51 kg	Mohd Lokman Mat Roji; Malaysia	Boulasdal Farid; Morocco	Frederiksson Lars Roger; Sweden
Elite Male 54 kg	Ariba Boubkar; Morocco	Murad Ahmed Salam; Iraq	Kevin Rouffle; France
Elite Male 54 kg	Ariba Boubkar; Morocco	Murad Ahmed Salam; Iraq	Ebrahim S. Islamuddin; Afghanistan
Elite Male 57 kg	Ahmamou Ayyoub; Morocco	Christino Singal; France	Coello Carlos; Spain
Elite Male 57 kg	Ahmamou Ayyoub; Morocco	Christino Singal; France	Thomson Reece Jake; Great Britain
Elite Male 60 kg	Begzod Amanon Begzod; Uzbekistan	Speth Norbert; Hungary	Sagyndykov Kazbek; Kazakhstan
Elite Male 60 kg	Begzod Amanon Begzod; Uzbekistan	Speth Norbert; Hungary	Al-Maliki Raafat Majid Ha; Sweden
Elite Male 63.5 kg	Abdulrazaaq Ameer Ibrahim; Iraq	Vo Van Dai; Vietnam	Wisen Richard William; Sweden
Elite Male 63.5 kg	Abdulrazaaq Ameer Ibrahim; Iraq	Vo Van Dai; Vietnam	Yuan Bing; China
Elite Male 67 kg	Petrov Anton Sergeev; Bulgaria	Al-Qaysi Akram Hasan; Iraq	Mackillop Matthew Dean; Canada
Elite Male 67 kg	Petrov Anton Sergeev; Bulgaria	Al-Qaysi Akram Hasan; Iraq	Ccanto Victor; Peru
Elite Male 71 kg	Numa Decagny; France	Kachkynbaev Mirbek; Kyrgyzstan	Ventura Lucas; Brazil
Elite Male 71 kg	Numa Decagny; France	Kachkynbaev Mirbek; Kyrgyzstan	Chakir Ilyass; Morocco
Elite Male 75 kg	Yaga Ngoto; France	Mazzetti Sergio; Peru	Khan Noel De Atta; Australia
Elite Male 75 kg	Yaga Ngoto; France	Mazzetti Sergio; Peru	Mackenzie Jacob; Canada
Elite Male 81 kg	Nielsen Kim Grundvad; Denmark	Maes Jens; Belgium	Matej Vojta; Czech Republic
Elite Male 81 kg	Nielsen Kim Grundvad; Denmark	Maes Jens; Belgium	Blaine Juan-Dre; South Africa
Elite Male 86 kg	Kazimov Kamoljon; Uzbekistan	Paterson Anthony; Canada	Malik Karim Skoli; France
Elite Male 86 kg	Kazimov Kamoljon; Uzbekistan	Paterson Anthony; Canada	Abdulateef Mohammed Imad; Iraq
Elite Male 91 kg	Hopman Zane; New Zealand	Kaouachi Florent; France	Styben Jakob; Germany
Elite Male 91 kg	Hopman Zane; New Zealand	Kaouachi Florent; France	Baker Mathew; United States
Elite Male 91+ kg	Jurjendgi Uku; Estonia	Farmer Jacob Allan; New Zealand	Mohamad Azwan Omar; Malaysia
Elite Male 91+ kg	Jurjendgi Uku; Estonia	Farmer Jacob Allan; New Zealand	Daffeh James; Sweden
