= 2022 European U22 Boxing Championships =

- Venue: Intersport Sport Hall
- Location: Poreč, Croatia
- Dates: 13 – 24 March 2022
- Competitors: 319 from 39 nations

The 2022 European U22 Men’s and Women’s Boxing Championships (8th) took place in Poreč, Croatia from 13 to 24 March 2022. Men and women boxers between the ages of 19 and 22 (based on the year of birth – 2000 & 2003) was eligible for this championships. Only one boxer per national federation per weight category would be allowed to compete.

On 4 March 2022 International Boxing Association made the decision to exclude Russian and Belarusian boxers as well as judges and officials from all international competitions. This means that the Russians could not take part in the 2022 European U22 Boxing Championships.

== Schedule ==
=== Men ===
Preliminary rounds
Quarterfinals
Semifinals
Final

Weight category	13 Mar	14 Mar	15 Mar	16 Mar	17 Mar	18 Mar	19 Mar	20 Mar	21 Mar	22 Mar	23 Mar	Total
Minimumweight (46-48 kg)							4	2			1	7
Flyweight (48-51 kg)		3					4	2			1	10
Bantamweight (51-54 kg)					5		4	2			1	12
Featherweight (54-57 kg)					5		4	2			1	12
Lightweight (57-60 kg)		1			8		4	2			1	16
Light Welterweight (60-63.5 kg)	10				8		4	2			1	25
Welterweight (63.5-67 kg)		9	8				4	2			1	24
Light Middleweight (67-71 kg)	7		8				4	2			1	22
Middleweight (71-75 kg)		5	8				4	2			1	20
Light Heavyweight (75-80 kg)		3	8				4	2			1	18
Cruiserweight (80-86 kg)		8					4	2			1	15
Heavyweight (86-92 kg)		5					4	2			1	12
Super Heavyweight (92+ kg)					3		4	2			1	10
Total	17	34	32	–	29	–	52	26	–	–	13	203

=== Women ===
Preliminary rounds
Quarterfinals
Semifinals
Final

Weight category	13 Mar	14 Mar	15 Mar	16 Mar	17 Mar	18 Mar	19 Mar	20 Mar	21 Mar	22 Mar	23 Mar	Total
Minimumweight (45–48 kg)				2		4		2		1		9
Light Flyweight (48-50 kg)				1		4		2		1		8
Flyweight (50-52 kg)						3		2		1		6
Bantamweight (52-54 kg)				4		4		2		1		11
Featherweight (54-57 kg)				8		4		2		1		15
Lightweight (57-60 kg)				2		4		2		1		9
Light Welterweight (60-63 kg)				1		4		2		1		8
Welterweight (63-66 kg)						3		2		1		6
Light Middleweight (66-70 kg)						2		2		1		5
Light Middleweight (66-70 kg)						3		2		1		6
Light Heavyweight (75-81 kg)								2		1		3
Heavyweight (81+ kg)						2		2		1		5
Total	–	–	–	18	–	37	–	24	–	12	–	91

== Medalists ==
=== Men ===
Event	Gold	Silver	Bronze
Minimumweight (46-48 kg)	Luka Kublashvili (GEO)	Andrii Yefymovych (UKR)	Ergyunal Sebahtin (BUL); Nurullah Oyan (TUR)
Flyweight (48-51 kg)	Nijat Huseynov (AZE)	Lekso Khasaia (GEO)	Mehmethan Çınar (TUR); Omer Ametović (SRB)
Bantamweight (51-54 kg)	Samet Gümüş (TUR)	Ruslan Gadirov (AZE)	Yelmir Nabuuev (UKR); Dylan Eagleson (IRL)
Featherweight (54-57 kg)	Michele Baldassi (ITA)	Ruslan Aslikyan (ARM)	Nikolay Marinov (BUL); Tahir Akkoyun (TUR)
Lightweight (57-60 kg)	Radoslav Rosenov (BUL)	Maksym Vlasiuk (UKR)	Salvador Flores Luque (ESP); Paul Loonam (IRL)
Light Welterweight (60-63.5 kg)	Kerem Özmen (TUR)	Artur Shakhpazyan (ARM)	Jalal Gurbanov (AZE); Lasha Gagnidze (GEO)
Welterweight (63.5-67 kg)	Nikolai Terteryan (DEN)	Ioan Croft (WAL)	Giacomo Micheli (ITA); Nabi Isgandarov (AZE)
Light Middleweight (67-71 kg)	Yurii Zakharieiev (UKR)	Garan Croft (WAL)	Sergio Martínez Martínez (ESP); Noa Ježek (CRO)
Middleweight (71-75 kg)	Gabrijel Veočić (CRO)	Rami Kiwan (BUL)	Sam Hickey (SCO); Almir Memić (SRB)
Light Heavyweight (75-80 kg)	Alfred Commey (ITA)	Gradus Kraus (NED)	Luka Matchutadze (GEO); Delil Dadaev (GER)
Cruiserweight (80-86 kg)	Yan Zak (ISR)	Ivan Sapun (UKR)	Alexander Okafor (GER); Anton Vinogradov (EST)
Heavyweight (86-92 kg)	Jack Marley (IRL)	Roberto Lizzi (ITA)	Emir Büyükdağ (TUR); Joseph Kostúr (SVK)
Super Heavyweight (92+ kg)	Ahmed Hagag (AUT)	Nikita Putilov (GER)	Vincenzo Fiaschetti (ITA); Vasyl Tkachuk (UKR)

=== Women ===
Event	Gold	Silver	Bronze
Minimumweight (45–48 kg)	Erivan Barut (TUR)	Nicole Ďuríková (SVK)	Erika Prisciandaro (ITA); Olga Shalimova (UKR)
Light Flyweight (48-50 kg)	Giordana Sorrentino (ITA)	Pihla Kaivo-oja (FIN)	Carmen González Ortega (ESP); Maxi Klötzer (GER)
Flyweight (50-52 kg)	Hatice Akbaş (TUR)	Nikolina Ćaćić (CRO)	Hajnalka Sipos (HUN); Sabina Novosad (UKR)
Bantamweight (52-54 kg)	Niamh Fay (IRL)	Sharon Prisco (ITA)	Olivia Holmes (ENG); Elene Loladze (GEO)
Featherweight (54-57 kg)	Biancamaria Tessari (ITA)	Sthélyne Grosy (FRA)	Sameenah Toussaint (ENG); Vilma Viitanen (FIN)
Lightweight (57-60 kg)	Jenin Heck (GER)	Loreadana-Andreea Marin (ROU)	Elida Kocharyan (ARM); Gizem En (TUR)
Light Welterweight (60-63 kg)	Miroslava Jedináková (SVK)	Gizem Özer (TUR)	Miriam Tommasone (ITA); Naiimo Bulhan (FIN)
Welterweight (63-66 kg)	Stefanie von Berge (GER)	Luca Hámori (HUN)	Kaci Rock (IRL); Beatrise Rozentāle (LAT)
Light Middleweight (66-70 kg)	Lisa O'Rourke (IRL)	Daria Parada (POL)	Lia Pukkila (ISR); Aleksandra Rapaić (SRB)
Middleweight (70-75 kg)	Karolina Makhno (UKR)	Aoibhe Carabine (IRL)	Vasiliki Stavridou (GRE); Barbara Marcinkowska (POL)
Light Heavyweight (75-81 kg)	Martyna Jancelewicz (POL)	Alexandra Petcu (ROU)	Olesia Krysiuk (UKR); Gabrielė Stonkutė (LTU)
Heavyweight (81+ kg)	Oliwia Toborek (POL)	Réka Hoffmann (HUN)	Daria Kozorez (MDA); Zaira García Garay (ESP)

== Medals tables ==
=== Men's ===
* Host nation (Croatia)

Rank	Nation	Gold	Silver	Bronze	Total
1	Italy	2	1	2	5
2	Turkey	2	0	4	6
3	Ukraine	1	3	2	6
4	Azerbaijan	1	1	2	4
4	Bulgaria	1	1	2	4
4	Georgia	1	1	2	4
7	Ireland	1	0	2	3
8	Croatia*	1	0	1	2
9	Austria	1	0	0	1
9	Denmark	1	0	0	1
9	Israel	1	0	0	1
12	Armenia	0	2	0	2
12	Wales	0	2	0	2
14	Germany	0	1	2	3
15	Netherlands	0	1	0	1
16	Serbia	0	0	2	2
16	Spain	0	0	2	2
18	Estonia	0	0	1	1
18	Scotland	0	0	1	1
18	Slovakia	0	0	1	1
Totals (20 entries)		13	13	26	52

=== Women's ===
* Host nation (Croatia)

Rank	Nation	Gold	Silver	Bronze	Total
1	Italy	2	1	2	5
2	Ireland	2	1	1	4
2	Poland	2	1	1	4
2	Turkey	2	1	1	4
5	Germany	2	0	1	3
6	Slovakia	1	1	0	2
7	Ukraine	1	0	3	4
8	Hungary	0	2	1	3
9	Romania	0	2	0	2
10	Finland	0	1	2	3
11	Croatia*	0	1	0	1
11	France	0	1	0	1
13	England	0	0	2	2
13	Spain	0	0	2	2
15	Armenia	0	0	1	1
15	Georgia	0	0	1	1
15	Greece	0	0	1	1
15	Israel	0	0	1	1
15	Latvia	0	0	1	1
15	Lithuania	0	0	1	1
15	Moldova	0	0	1	1
15	Serbia	0	0	1	1
Totals (22 entries)		12	12	24	48

== Participating countries ==
Russia and Belarus banned from attending all international competitions due to the 2022 Russian invasion of Ukraine.

== Draw Sheets ==
=== Men's Minimumweight (46-48 kg) ===
Quarterfinals		Semifinals		Final
Andrii Yefymovych (UKR)	4
Giuliano Goman (GER)	1	Andrii Yefymovych (UKR)	5
Ergyunal Sebahtin (BUL)	5	Ergyunal Sebahtin (BUL)	0
Padraig Downey (IRL)	0			Andrii Yefymovych (UKR)	1
Seyran Yeghikyan (ARM)	1			Luka Kublashvili (GEO)	4
Nurullah Oyan (TUR)	4	Nurullah Oyan (TUR)	0
Luka Kublashvili (GEO)	5	Luka Kublashvili (GEO)	5
Dumitru Vieru (MDA)	0

=== Men's Flyweight (48-51 kg) ===
First round
Lennon Mulligan (SCO)	5
Siiovush Mukhammadiiev (UKR)	0
Henrik Sahakyan (ARM)	0
Lekso Khasaia (GEO)	4
Attila Bernáth (HUN)	RSC
Haris Aganović (BIH)

Quarterfinals
Mehmethan Çınar (TUR)	3
Lennon Mulligan (SCO)	2
Clepson Paiva (IRL)	0
Nijat Huseynov (AZE)	5
Théo Ticout (FRA)	2
Lekso Khasaia (GEO)	3
Attila Bernáth (HUN)	1
Omer Ametović (SRB)	4

Semifinals
Mehmethan Çınar (TUR)	2
Nijat Huseynov (AZE)	3
Lekso Khasaia (GEO)	4
Omer Ametović (SRB)	1

Final
Nijat Huseynov (AZE)	5
Lekso Khasaia (GEO)	0

=== Men's Bantamweight (51-54 kg) ===
First round
Gheorghe Ghinoiu (ROU)	5
Bashkim Bajoku (KOS)	0
Yelmir Nabuuev (UKR)	3
Patrick Cappai (ITA)	2
Giorgi Sajaia (GEO)	5
László Bernáth (HUN)	0
Yasen Radev (BUL)	3
Ibrahim Boukedim (FRA)	1
Erik Tokhyan (ARM)	0
Dylan Eagleson (IRL)	5

Quarterfinals
Ruslan Gadirov (AZE)	5
Gheorghe Ghinoiu (ROU)	0
Yelmir Nabuuev (UKR)	3
Giorgi Sajaia (GEO)	2
Samet Gümüş (TUR)	3
Yasen Radev (BUL)	1
Dylan Eagleson (IRL)	5
Jakub Krzpiet (POL)	0

Semifinals
Ruslan Gadirov (AZE)	3
Yelmir Nabuuev (UKR)	2
Samet Gümüş (TUR)	3
Dylan Eagleson (IRL)	2

Final
Ruslan Gadirov (AZE)	0
Samet Gümüş (TUR)	5

=== Men's Featherweight (54-57 kg) ===
First round
Malik Shadalov (GER)
Michele Baldassi (ITA)	RSC
Juan Pantoja Moreno (ESP)	1
Nikolay Marinov (BUL)	4
Sejdi Nazif (SRB)
Dmitriy Molodan (UKR)	WO
Ruslan Aslikyan (ARM)	5
Nebil Ibrahim (SWE)	0
Jake Taylor (IRL)	0
Tahir Akkoyun (TUR)	5

Quarterfinals
Eusebiu Tirzoman (ROU)	0
Michele Baldassi (ITA)	5
Nikolay Marinov (BUL)	4
Dmitriy Molodan (UKR)	1
Paweł Brach (POL)	2
Ruslan Aslikyan (ARM)	3
Tahir Akkoyun (TUR)	3
Maksud Khasmetov (AZE)	2

Semifinals
Michele Baldassi (ITA)	5
Nikolay Marinov (BUL)	0
Ruslan Aslikyan (ARM)	4
Tahir Akkoyun (TUR)	0

Final
Michele Baldassi (ITA)	5
Ruslan Aslikyan (ARM)	0

=== Men's Lightweight (57-60 kg) ===
First round
Yiğit Us (TUR)	5
Artur Soloviov (MDA)	0

Second round
Ahmet Sor (GER)	4
Yiğit Us (TUR)	1
Salvador Flores Luque (ESP)	5
Semiz Aličić (SRB)	0
Radoslav Rosenov (BUL)	4
Artur Sahakyan (ARM)	1
Konstantinos Sarkiris (GRE)	1
Marian Chiriac (ROU)	4
Mikołaj Mańka (POL)	1
Elias Idrissi (DEN)	4
Maksym Vlasiuk (UKR)	5
Patrik Licul (CRO)	0
Simone Spada (ITA)	5
Luka Veljović (BIH)	0
Paul Loonam (IRL)	5
Ruben Római (HUN)	0

Quarterfinals
Ahmet Sor (GER)	0
Salvador Flores Luque (ESP)	5
Radoslav Rosenov (BUL)	RSC
Marian Chiriac (ROU)
Elias Idrissi (DEN)	0
Maksym Vlasiuk (UKR)	5
Simone Spada (ITA)	0
Paul Loonam (IRL)	5

Semifinals
Salvador Flores Luque (ESP)	0
Radoslav Rosenov (BUL)	5
Maksym Vlasiuk (UKR)	3
Paul Loonam (IRL)	2

Final
Radoslav Rosenov (BUL)	5
Maksym Vlasiuk (UKR)	0

=== Men's Light Welterweight (60-63.5 kg) ===
First round
Miroslav Herceg (SVK)	3
Sayed Kazemi (NOR)	2
Artur Shakhpazyan (ARM)	5
Jegors Mamaševs (LAT)	0
Krasimir Dzhurov (BUL)	2
Erik Suchý (CZE)	3
Jere Niemeläinen (FIN)	0
Jalal Gurbanov (AZE)	5
Nenad Jovanović (SRB)	3
Ștefan Vozneacovschi (MDA)	2
Abou-Arab Abdallah Nazih (DEN)	2
Lasha Gagnidze (GEO)	3
Beniamin Zarzeczny (POL)	2
Andrejus Lavrenovas (LTU)	3
Deni Alagić (CRO)	4
Semjon Kamanin (EST)	1
Oier Ibarreche Conde (ESP)	3
Luke Bibby (SCO)	2
James McDonagh (IRL)	0
Kerem Özmen (TUR)	4

Second round
Hampus Broman (SWE)	5
Miroslav Herceg (SVK)	0
Artur Shakhpazyan (ARM)	5
Erik Suchý (CZE)	0
Nik Nikolov Veber (SLO)	0
Jalal Gurbanov (AZE)	3
Nenad Jovanović (SRB)	2
Ihor Kovtun (UKR)	3
Joseph Tyers (ENG)	0
Lasha Gagnidze (GEO)	4
Andrejus Lavrenovas (LTU)	RSC
Angelo Morello (ITA)
Deni Alagić (CRO)	4
Oier Ibarreche Conde (ESP)	1
Kerem Özmen (TUR)	4
David Gkevorgkian (GER)	1

Quarterfinals
Hampus Broman (SWE)	2
Artur Shakhpazyan (ARM)	3
Jalal Gurbanov (AZE)	5
Ihor Kovtun (UKR)	0
Lasha Gagnidze (GEO)	5
Andrejus Lavrenovas (LTU)	0
Deni Alagić (CRO)	0
Kerem Özmen (TUR)	5

Semifinals
Artur Shakhpazyan (ARM)	3
Jalal Gurbanov (AZE)	2
Lasha Gagnidze (GEO)	2
Kerem Özmen (TUR)	3

Final
Artur Shakhpazyan (ARM)	0
Kerem Özmen (TUR)	5

=== Men's Welterweight (63.5-67 kg) ===
First round
Frank Martínez Bernad (ESP)	1
Ioan Croft (WAL)	4
Nedas Gudomskas (LTU)	1
Vensan Kirkorov (BUL)	4
Barry O'Connor (IRL)	4
Aljaž Šircelj (SLO)	1
Jan Polák (CZE)	0
Giacomo Micheli (ITA)	3
George Dumitrescu (ROU)	1
Mehmet Aydemir (TUR)	4
Adolf Staněk (SVK)	0
Yaroslav Mykhalushko (UKR)	5
Oliwier Zamojski (POL)	0
Nikolai Terteryan (DEN)	5
Nabi Isgandarov (AZE)	5
Luka Nikabadze (GEO)	0
Farshid Sourmanshahi (NED)	0
Shpetim Bajoku (KOS)	5

Second round
Džejlan Toskić (SRB)	0
Ioan Croft (WAL)	5
Vensan Kirkorov (BUL)	0
Barry O'Connor (IRL)	5
Tomislav Vukomanović (BIH)	0
Giacomo Micheli (ITA)	5
Mehmet Aydemir (TUR)	5
Harutyun Hakobkokhyan (ARM)	0
Martin Skogheim (NOR)	0
Yaroslav Mykhalushko (UKR)	5
Nikolai Terteryan (DEN)	5
Chris Djoua Eloundou (GER)	0
Alen Ahmetović (CRO)	0
Nabi Isgandarov (AZE)	5
Shpetim Bajoku (KOS)
Hugo Grau (FRA)	ABD

Quarterfinals
Ioan Croft (WAL)	5
Barry O'Connor (IRL)	0
Giacomo Micheli (ITA)	4
Mehmet Aydemir (TUR)	1
Yaroslav Mykhalushko (UKR)	1
Nikolai Terteryan (DEN)	4
Nabi Isgandarov (AZE)	KO
Hugo Grau (FRA)

Semifinals
Ioan Croft (WAL)	5
Giacomo Micheli (ITA)	0
Nikolai Terteryan (DEN)	4
Nabi Isgandarov (AZE)	1

Final
Ioan Croft (WAL)	0
Nikolai Terteryan (DEN)	5

=== Men's Light Middleweight (67-71 kg) ===
First round
Nicolae Bucșa (MDA)	0
Sergio Martínez Martínez (ESP)	4
Adam Messibah (SUI)	4
Frank Kilp (GER)	1
Alperen Terzi (TUR)	2
Makan Traoré (FRA)	3
Manuel Lombardi (ITA)	0
Garan Croft (WAL)	5
István Gerzsenyi (HUN)	5
Darragh Gilroy (IRL)	0
Noa Ježek (CRO)	5
Erikas Laurikietis (LTU)	0
Cosmin Hermeziu (ROU)	KO
Gašper Podgoršek (SLO)

Second round
Giorgi Zhorzholiani (GEO)	2
Sergio Martínez Martínez (ESP)	3
Marcel Meinl (AUT)	5
Giani Dedić (BIH)	0
Senad Drini (ALB)	WO
Adam Messibah (SUI)
Makan Traoré (FRA)	0
Yurii Zakharieiev (UKR)	5
Don Emini (NOR)	0
Garan Croft (WAL)	5
István Gerzsenyi (HUN)	3
Narek Zakharyan (ARM)	2
Adam Valenta (CZE)	0
Noa Ježek (CRO)	5
Cosmin Hermeziu (ROU)	1
Mateusz Urban (POL)	4

Quarterfinals
Sergio Martínez Martínez (ESP)	5
Marcel Meinl (AUT)	0
Senad Drini (ALB)	0
Yurii Zakharieiev (UKR)	5
Garan Croft (WAL)	5
István Gerzsenyi (HUN)	0
Noa Ježek (CRO)	5
Mateusz Urban (POL)	0

Semifinals
Sergio Martínez Martínez (ESP)	0
Yurii Zakharieiev (UKR)	5
Garan Croft (WAL)	4
Noa Ježek (CRO)	1

Final
Yurii Zakharieiev (UKR)	5
Garan Croft (WAL)	0

=== Men's Middleweight (71-75 kg) ===
First round
Maksim Ljubimov (EST)	0
Daniel Ilyushonok (ISR)	5
Vakhtang Harutyunyan (ARM)	2
Majd Alsafadi (SWE)	3
Mirsharif Kazimzade (AZE)	0
Sam Hickey (SCO)	5
Dejan Leburić (SLO)	0
Aleksandr Trofimcuk (LTU)	5
Iulian Dumitrescu (ROU)	1
Dominik Gloser (CZE)	4

Second round
Lukáš Fernéza (SVK)	3
Daniel Ilyushonok (ISR)	2
Gabrijel Veočić (CRO)	5
Leo Cvitanović (BIH)	0
Yusuf Özdemir (TUR)	3
Majd Alsafadi (SWE)	2
Sam Hickey (SCO)	3
Pablo Coy Bernal (ESP)	0
Mykyta Alistratov (UKR)	5
Aleksandr Trofimcuk (LTU)	0
Dawid Oelrich (POL)	0
Almir Memić (SRB)	5
Marcel Mangold (GER)	1
Rami Kiwan (BUL)	4
Dominik Gloser (CZE)	0
Soma Mester (HUN)	5

Quarterfinals
Lukáš Fernéza (SVK)	0
Gabrijel Veočić (CRO)	5
Yusuf Özdemir (TUR)	0
Sam Hickey (SCO)	5
Mykyta Alistratov (UKR)	1
Almir Memić (SRB)	4
Rami Kiwan (BUL)	5
Soma Mester (HUN)	0

Semifinals
Gabrijel Veočić (CRO)	4
Sam Hickey (SCO)	1
Almir Memić (SRB)	0
Rami Kiwan (BUL)	5

Final
Gabrijel Veočić (CRO)	4
Rami Kiwan (BUL)	1

=== Men's Light Heavyweight (75-80 kg) ===
First round
Luka Matchutadze (GEO)	3
Bogdan Tolmachov (UKR)	2
Serban Florin-Catalin (ROU)	0
Delil Dadaev (GER)	5
Alfred Commey (ITA)	5
Raphaël Monny (FRA)	0

Second round
Taylor Bevan (WAL)	2
Luka Matchutadze (GEO)	3
Abdelouahed Akoubach (ESP)	0
Andrei Chiriacov (MDA)	5
Kristiyan Nikolov (BUL)	2
Gradus Kraus (NED)	3
Nikita Nystedt (FIN)	3
Gor Nersesyan (ARM)	0
Petar Leskur (CRO)	0
Delil Dadaev (GER)	5
Stiven Aas (EST)	2
Kaan Aykutsun (TUR)	3
Martin Fitan (CZE)	5
István Krekó (HUN)	0
Alfred Commey (ITA)	4
Murad Allahverdiyev (AZE)	1

Quarterfinals
Luka Matchutadze (GEO)	4
Andrei Chiriacov (MDA)	1
Gradus Kraus (NED)	5
Nikita Nystedt (FIN)	0
Delil Dadaev (GER)	5
Kaan Aykutsun (TUR)	0
Martin Fitan (CZE)	0
Alfred Commey (ITA)	5

Semifinals
Luka Matchutadze (GEO)
Gradus Kraus (NED)	ABD
Delil Dadaev (GER)	1
Alfred Commey (ITA)	4

Final
Gradus Kraus (NED)	1
Alfred Commey (ITA)	4

=== Men's Cruiserweight (80-86 kg) ===
First round
Dániel Baracsi (HUN)	0
Alexander Okafor (GER)	5
Domenico Vinciguerra (ITA)	5
Marko Ramljak (CRO)	0
Ivan Sapun (UKR)	5
Albert Ugrinčić (BIH)	0
Petar Liješević (MNE)	1
Emrah Yaşar (TUR)	4
Aras Dudėnas (LTU)	3
Mario Mitev (BUL)	2
David Klíč (CZE)
Yan Zak (ISR)	ABO
Jakub Straszewski (POL)	3
Henrik Tshghrikyan (ARM)	1
Remzo Mustafić (KOS)	1
Anton Vinogradov (EST)	4

Quarterfinals
Alexander Okafor (GER)	5
Domenico Vinciguerra (ITA)	0
Ivan Sapun (UKR)	5
Emrah Yaşar (TUR)	0
Aras Dudėnas (LTU)	0
Yan Zak (ISR)	5
Jakub Straszewski (POL)	0
Anton Vinogradov (EST)	3

Semifinals
Alexander Okafor (GER)	1
Ivan Sapun (UKR)	4
Yan Zak (ISR)	KO
Anton Vinogradov (EST)

Final
Ivan Sapun (UKR)	2
Yan Zak (ISR)	3

=== Men's Heavyweight (86-92 kg) ===
First round
Vitalii Stalchenko (UKR)	0
Mateusz Bereźnicki (POL)	5
Pavol Hrivnák (CZE)	4
Daniel Ivanovski (ISR)	1
Emir Büyükdağ (TUR)	RSC
Jan Moravec (CRO)
Roberto Lizzi (ITA)	4
Levente Kiss (HUN)	1
Darius Voišnarovic (LTU)	1
Joseph Kostúr (SVK)	4

Quarterfinals
Jack Marley (IRL)	5
Mateusz Bereźnicki (POL)	0
Pavol Hrivnák (CZE)	0
Emir Büyükdağ (TUR)	5
Laurens Hagen (GER)	1
Roberto Lizzi (ITA)	4
Joseph Kostúr (SVK)	4
Valeriu Razmerita (MDA)	1

Semifinals
Jack Marley (IRL)	5
Emir Büyükdağ (TUR)	0
Roberto Lizzi (ITA)	4
Joseph Kostúr (SVK)	1

Final
Jack Marley (IRL)	5
Roberto Lizzi (ITA)	0

=== Men's Super Heavyweight (92+ kg) ===
First round
Nikita Putilov (GER)	5
Josip Ćorić (CRO)	0
Dylan Rajić (BIH)	0
Vasyl Tkachuk (UKR)	5
Uğur Aydemir (TUR)	3
Koppány Fehér (HUN)	0

Quarterfinals
Ștefan Lătescu (ROU)	0
Nikita Putilov (GER)	5
Hovhannes Papazyan (ARM)	0
Vincenzo Fiaschetti (ITA)	5
Šimon Šuster (CZE)	2
Vasyl Tkachuk (UKR)	3
Uğur Aydemir (TUR)	0
Ahmed Hagag (AUT)	5

Semifinals
Nikita Putilov (GER)	4
Vincenzo Fiaschetti (ITA)	1
Vasyl Tkachuk (UKR)	0
Ahmed Hagag (AUT)	5

Final
Nikita Putilov (GER)	0
Ahmed Hagag (AUT)	5

=== Women's Minimumweight (45-48 kg) ===
First round
Nicole Ďuríková (SVK)	4
Nicole Clyde (IRL)	1
Erivan Barut (TUR)	5
Gayane Ter-Barseghyan (ARM)	0

Quarterfinals
Marta López del Árbol (ESP)	2
Nicole Ďuríková (SVK)	3
Olga Shalimova (UKR)	5
Ambrine Zitouni (FRA)	0
Petra Mezei (HUN)	0
Erika Prisciandaro (ITA)	5
Erivan Barut (TUR)	4
Natalia Kuczewska (POL)	1

Semifinals
Nicole Ďuríková (SVK)	5
Olga Shalimova (UKR)	0
Erika Prisciandaro (ITA)	0
Erivan Barut (TUR)	5

Final
Nicole Ďuríková (SVK)	0
Erivan Barut (TUR)	5

=== Women's Light Flyweight (48-50 kg) ===
First round
Rabia Topuz (TUR)	4
Yaroslava Marynchuk (UKR)	1

Quarterfinals
Maxi Klötzer (GER)	5
Rabia Topuz (TUR)	0
Pihla Kaivo-oja (FIN)	5
Caitlin Fryers (IRL)	0
Carmen González Ortega (ESP)	5
Alexandra Gheorghe (ROU)	0
Giordana Sorrentino (ITA)	5
Savannah Stubley (ENG)	0

Semifinals
Maxi Klötzer (GER)	2
Pihla Kaivo-oja (FIN)	3
Carmen González Ortega (ESP)	0
Giordana Sorrentino (ITA)	5

Final
Pihla Kaivo-oja (FIN)	1
Giordana Sorrentino (ITA)	4

=== Women's Flyweight (50-52 kg) ===
Quarterfinals
Daina Moorehouse (IRL)	2
Nikolina Ćaćić (CRO)	3
Hajnalka Sipos (HUN)	5
Arevik Dokholyan (ARM)	0
Chrysoula Plea (GRE)
Hatice Akbaş (TUR)	ABO

Semifinals
Sabina Novosad (UKR)	0
Nikolina Ćaćić (CRO)	5
Hajnalka Sipos (HUN)	0
Hatice Akbaş (TUR)	5

Final
Nikolina Ćaćić (CRO)
Hatice Akbaş (TUR)	RSC

=== Women's Bantamweight (52-54 kg) ===
First round
Antonia Giannakopoulou (GRE)	3
Gamze Soğuksu (TUR)	2
Bianca Cobzaru (ROU)	1
Sharon Prisco (ITA)	4
Salma Friga (FRA)	3
Zehra Milli (SWE)	2
Niamh Fay (IRL)	5
Anastasia Lesinska (UKR)	0

Quarterfinals
Elene Loladze (GEO)	3
Antonia Giannakopoulou (GRE)	2
Sharon Prisco (ITA)	5
Karolina Ampulska (POL)	0
Olivia Holmes (ENG)	5
Salma Friga (FRA)	0
Niamh Fay (IRL)	5
Jonna Hakkarainen (FIN)	0

Semifinals
Elene Loladze (GEO)	2
Sharon Prisco (ITA)	3
Olivia Holmes (ENG)	0
Niamh Fay (IRL)	4

Final
Sharon Prisco (ITA)	0
Niamh Fay (IRL)	5

=== Women's Featherweight (54-57 kg) ===
First round
Sameenah Toussaint (ENG)	5
Julia Szeremeta (POL)	0
Bojana Gojković (MNE)
Vanuhi Manasyan (GEO)	WO
Zara Breslin (IRL)	5
Beáta Varga (HUN)	0
Andreea Alecu (ROU)	0
Biancamaria Tessari (ITA)	5
Melissa Mortensen (DEN)	5
Ani Manukyan (GER)	0
Sthélyne Grosy (FRA)	RSC
Cristina Chiper (MDA)
Vilma Viitanen (FIN)	5
Dea Bolanča (CRO)	0
Uliana Poluianova (UKR)	0
Esra Özyol (TUR)	5

Quarterfinals
Sameenah Toussaint (ENG)	RSC
Vanuhi Manasyan (GEO)
Zara Breslin (IRL)	1
Biancamaria Tessari (ITA)	4
Melissa Mortensen (DEN)	0
Sthélyne Grosy (FRA)	5
Vilma Viitanen (FIN)	5
Esra Özyol (TUR)	0

Semifinals
Sameenah Toussaint (ENG)	2
Biancamaria Tessari (ITA)	3
Sthélyne Grosy (FRA)	4
Vilma Viitanen (FIN)	1

Final
Biancamaria Tessari (ITA)	3
Sthélyne Grosy (FRA)	2

=== Women's Lightweight (57-60 kg) ===
First round
Jenin Heck (GER)	5
Petra Szabó (HUN)	0
Daniela Golino (ITA)	0
Loreadana-Andreea Marin (ROU)	5

Quarterfinals
Veronika Gajdová (CZE)	0
Jenin Heck (GER)	5
Elida Kocharyan (ARM)	RSC
Suvi Tujula (FIN)
Amina Abramova (UKR)	2
Gizem En (TUR)	3
Loreadana-Andreea Marin (ROU)	5
Husne Calisir (NED)	0

Semifinals
Jenin Heck (GER)	5
Elida Kocharyan (ARM)	0
Gizem En (TUR)	0
Loreadana-Andreea Marin (ROU)	3

Final
Jenin Heck (GER)	4
Loreadana-Andreea Marin (ROU)	1

=== Women's Light Welterweight (60-63 kg) ===
First round
Gizem Özer (TUR)	3
Luna Beeloo (NED)	2

Quarterfinals
Valeriia Kapustina (UKR)	0
Gizem Özer (TUR)	5
Ana Stojanović (CRO)
Naiimo Bulhan (FIN)	RSC
Felicitas Ganglbauer (GER)	0
Miroslava Jedináková (SVK)	5
Miriam Tommasone (ITA)	5
Eve Woods (IRL)	0

Semifinals
Gizem Özer (TUR)	5
Naiimo Bulhan (FIN)	0
Miroslava Jedináková (SVK)	RSC
Miriam Tommasone (ITA)

Final
Gizem Özer (TUR)	0
Miroslava Jedináková (SVK)	5

=== Women's Welterweight (63-66 kg) ===
Quarterfinals
Kaci Rock (IRL)	3
Maryna Stoiko (UKR)	2
Nikolina Gajić (SRB)	0
Beatrise Rozentāle (LAT)	5
Luca Hámori (HUN)	RSC
Berfin Polat (TUR)

Semifinals
Stefanie von Berge (GER)	5
Kaci Rock (IRL)	0
Beatrise Rozentāle (LAT)	0
Luca Hámori (HUN)	5

Final
Stefanie von Berge (GER)	5
Luca Hámori (HUN)	0

=== Women's Light Middleweight (66-70 kg) ===
Quarterfinals		Semifinals		Final
		Aleksandra Rapaić (SRB)	0
Anastasiia Vasylyshyn (UKR)		Daria Parada (POL)	5
Daria Parada (POL)	RSC			Daria Parada (POL)	1
Lisa O'Rourke (IRL)	5			Lisa O'Rourke (IRL)	4
Melissa Gemini (ITA)	0	Lisa O'Rourke (IRL)	5
		Lia Pukkila (ISR)	0

=== Women's Middleweight (70-75 kg) ===
Quarterfinals
Vasiliki Stavridou (GRE)	RSC
Sıla Üçyıldız (TUR)
Aoibhe Carabine (IRL)	5
Regina Lakos (HUN)	0
Elsidita Selaj (ALB)	0
Barbara Marcinkowska (POL)	5

Semifinals
Karolina Makhno (UKR)	3
Vasiliki Stavridou (GRE)	2
Aoibhe Carabine (IRL)	5
Barbara Marcinkowska (POL)	0

Final
Karolina Makhno (UKR)	5
Aoibhe Carabine (IRL)	0

=== Women's Light Heavyweight (75-81 kg) ===
Semifinals		Final
Gabrielė Stonkutė (LTU)	2
Alexandra Petcu (ROU)	3	Alexandra Petcu (ROU)	0
Martyna Jancelewicz (POL)	RSC	Martyna Jancelewicz (POL)	5
Olesia Krysiuk (UKR)

=== Women's Heavyweight (81+ kg) ===
Quarterfinals		Semifinals		Final
		Daria Kozorez (MDA)	1
Sueda Şahin (TUR)		Oliwia Toborek (POL)	4
Oliwia Toborek (POL)	DSQ			Oliwia Toborek (POL)	5
Victoria Levchuk (UKR)	0			Réka Hoffmann (HUN)	0
Zaira García Garay (ESP)	5	Zaira García Garay (ESP)	0
		Réka Hoffmann (HUN)	5
