= Boxing at the 2024 Summer Olympics – Men's 92 kg =

Men's 92 kg at the Games of the XXXIII Olympiad
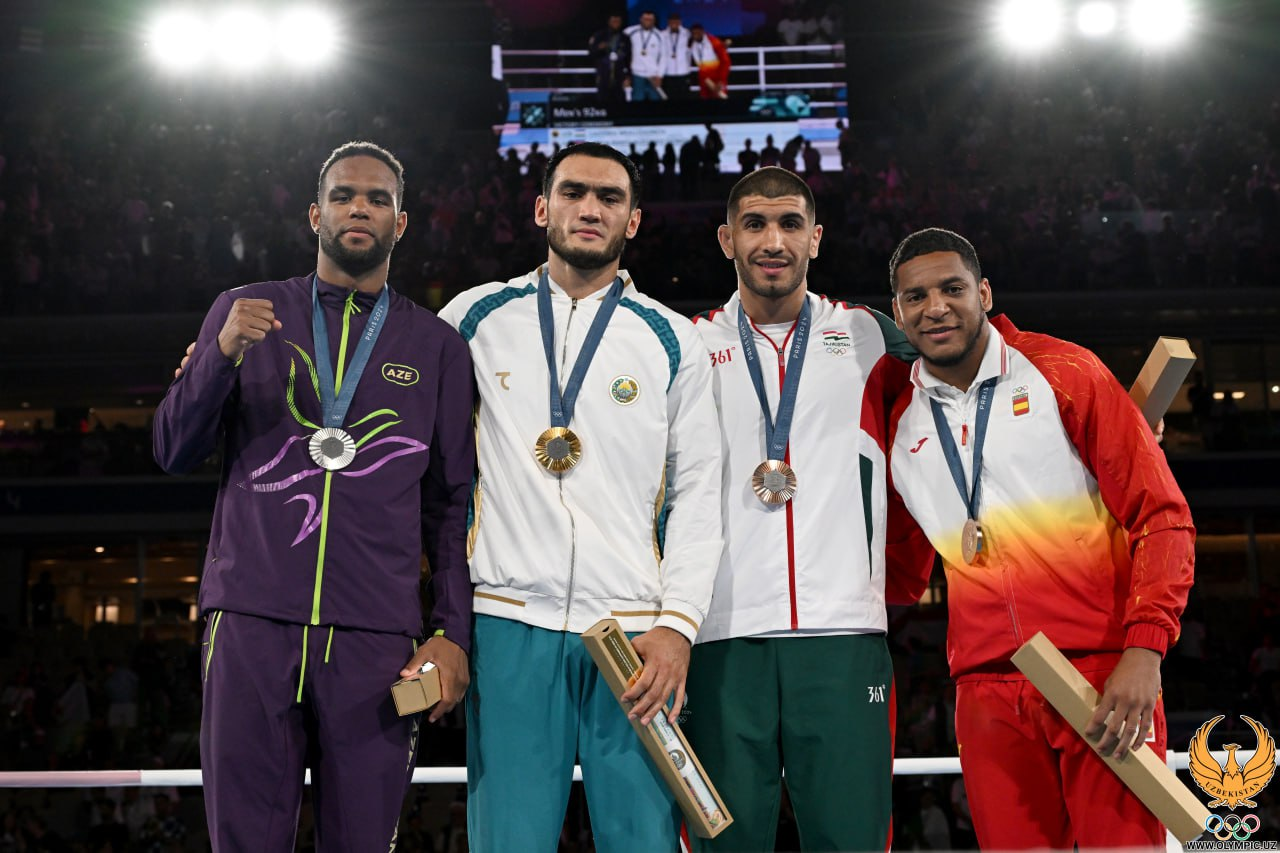
- Award ceremony; Pictured from left to right are Loren Alfonso (AZE), Lazizbek Mullojonov (UZB), Davlat Boltaev (TJK), and Enmanuel Reyes (ESP)
- Venue: Arena Paris Nord (preliminary); Stade Roland Garros (semifinals and finals)
- Dates: 28 July – 9 August 2024
- Competitors: 16 from 16 nations

Medalists
1st place, gold medalist(s)		Lazizbek Mullojonov	Uzbekistan
2nd place, silver medalist(s)		Loren Alfonso	Azerbaijan
3rd place, bronze medalist(s)		Enmanuel Reyes	Spain
3rd place, bronze medalist(s)		Davlat Boltaev	Tajikistan

The men's 92 kg (heavyweight) boxing event at the 2024 Summer Olympics took place between 28 July and 9 August 2024. Preliminary boxing matches occurred at Arena Paris Nord in Villepinte, with the medal rounds (semifinals and finals) staged at Stade Roland Garros.

== Background ==
The defending champion Julio César La Cruz lost to the eventual silver medalist Loren Alfonso, the 2020 silver medalist Muslim Gadzhimagomedov did not participate because IOC barred the Russian Olympic Committee (ROC) from participation due to war in Ukraine. One of the 2020 bronze medalists, David Nyika, turned professional and did not participate, and another one, Abner Teixeira, moved to a different wight category.

== Qualification ==
Each NOC could send one boxer to the event.

== Competition format ==
Like all Olympic boxing events, the competition was a straight single-elimination tournament. The competition began with a preliminary round, where the number of competitors was reduced to 16, and concluded with a final. As there were fewer than 32 boxers in the competition, a number of boxers received a bye through the preliminary round. Both semi-final losers were awarded bronze medals.

Bouts consisted of three three-minute rounds with a one-minute break between rounds. A boxer may win by knockout or by points. Scoring was on the "10-point-must," with five judges scoring each round. Judges consider "number of blows landed on the target areas, domination of the bout, technique and tactical superiority and competitiveness." Each judge determined a winner for each round, who received 10 points for the round, and assigned the round's loser a number of points between seven and nine based on performance. The judge's scores for each round were added to give a total score for that judge. The boxer with the higher score from a majority of the judges was the winner.

== Schedule ==
The schedule was as follows.

Legend

R16	Round of 16	QF	Quarter-Finals	SF	Semi-Finals	F	Final

Jul 28	Jul 29	Jul 30	Jul 31	Aug 1	Aug 2	Aug 3	Aug 4	Aug 5	Aug 6	Aug 7	Aug 8	Aug 9
R16				QF			SF					F

== Draw ==
The draw was held on 25 July 2024.

== Seeds ==
The seeds were released on 25 July 2024.

1. Ato Plodzicki-Faoagali (SAM) (round of 16)
2. Davlat Boltaev (TJK) (semifinals)
3. Aziz Abbes Mouhiidine (ITA) (round of 16)
4. Julio César La Cruz (CUB) (round of 16)
5. Olaitan Olaore (NGR) (round of 16)
6. Keno Machado (BRA) (quarterfinals)
7. Jack Marley (IRL) (quarterfinals)
8. Han Xuezhen (CHN) (round of 16)

== Results ==
Round of 16
28 July
Ato Plodzicki-Faoagali (SAM)	0
Victor Schelstraete (BEL)	5
28 July
Enmanuel Reyes (ESP)	4
Han Xuezhen (CHN)	1
28 July
Olaitan Olaore (NGR)	0
Aibek Oralbay (KAZ)	5
28 July
Loren Alfonso (AZE)	3
Julio César La Cruz (CUB)	2
28 July
Aziz Abbes Mouhiidine (ITA)	1
Lazizbek Mullojonov (UZB)	4
28 July
Patrick Brown (GBR)	1
Keno Machado (BRA)	4
28 July
Jack Marley (IRL)	4
Mateusz Bereźnicki (POL)	1
28 July
Georgii Kushitashvili (GEO)	2
Davlat Boltaev (TJK)	3

Quarterfinals
1 August
Victor Schelstraete (BEL)	0
Enmanuel Reyes (ESP)	5
1 August
Aibek Oralbay (KAZ)	2
Loren Alfonso (AZE)	3
1 August
Lazizbek Mullojonov (UZB)	5
Keno Machado (BRA)	0
1 August
Jack Marley (IRL)	1
Davlat Boltaev (TJK)	4

Semifinals
4 August
Enmanuel Reyes (ESP)	1
Loren Alfonso (AZE)	4
4 August
Lazizbek Mullojonov (UZB)	4
Davlat Boltaev (TJK)	1

Final
9 August
Loren Alfonso (AZE)	0
Lazizbek Mullojonov (UZB)	5
