= 2023 IBA World Boxing Championships – Heavyweight =

Heavyweight at the 2023 IBA World Boxing Championships
- Venue: Humo Arena
- Location: Tashkent, Uzbekistan
- Dates: 1–13 May
- Competitors: 37 from 37 nations

Medalists
gold medal	Muslim Gadzhimagomedov	Russia
silver medal	Aziz Abbes Mouhiidine	Italy
bronze medal	Lazizbek Mullojonov	Uzbekistan
bronze medal	Narek Manasyan	Armenia

The Heavyweight competition at the 2023 IBA Men's World Boxing Championships was held between 1 and 13 May 2023.

== Results ==
=== Finals ===
Semifinals
(Uzbekistan) Lazizbek Mullojonov	1
(Russia) Muslim Gadzhimagomedov	4
(Italy) Aziz Abbes Mouhiidine	5
(Armenia) Narek Manasyan	0

Final
(Russia) Muslim Gadzhimagomedov	4
(Italy) Aziz Abbes Mouhiidine	3

=== Top half ===
==== Section 1 ====
Round of 64
(Mongolia) Khaligiin Byeknur
(Bosnia and Herzegovina) Džemal Bošnjak	w/o

Round of 32
(Cuba) Julio César La Cruz	5
(Bosnia and Herzegovina) Džemal Bošnjak	0
(Australia) Ikenna Enyi	5
(Guinea) Ibrahima Sory Barry	0
(Georgia (country)) Giorgi Tchigladze	4
(Turkey) Berat Acar	3
(Colombia) Marlon Hurtado	0
(Uzbekistan) Lazizbek Mullojonov	5

Round of 16
(Cuba) Julio César La Cruz	5
(Australia) Ikenna Enyi	0
(Georgia (country)) Giorgi Tchigladze	0
(Uzbekistan) Lazizbek Mullojonov	5

Quarterfinals
(Cuba) Julio César La Cruz	1
(Uzbekistan) Lazizbek Mullojonov	4

==== Section 2 ====
Round of 64
(France) Soheb Bouafia	5
(Greece) Vagkan Nanitzanian	0
(Germany) Youssef Lazar	0
(Moldova) Andrei Zaplitnîi	5

Round of 32
(Russia) Muslim Gadzhimagomedov	5
(France) Soheb Bouafia	0
(China) Han Xuezhen	4
(Croatia) Marko Čalić	1
(Romania) Emanuel Mican
(Syria) Alaa Ghoussoun	RSC
(Moldova) Andrei Zaplitnîi	0
(Brazil) Keno Machado	5

Round of 16
(Russia) Muslim Gadzhimagomedov	5
(China) Han Xuezhen	0
(Syria) Alaa Ghoussoun	0
(Brazil) Keno Machado	5

Quarterfinals
(Russia) Muslim Gadzhimagomedov	4
(Brazil) Keno Machado	3

=== Bottom half ===
==== Section 3 ====
Round of 64
(Kazakhstan) Aibek Oralbay	5
(Bulgaria) Radoslav Pantaleev	0

Round of 32
(Italy) Aziz Abbes Mouhiidine	4
(Kazakhstan) Aibek Oralbay	0
(Ecuador) Julio Castillo	5
(Luxembourg) Michel Erpelding	0
(Mexico) Carlos Rodríguez	5
(Senegal) Karamba Kébé	0
(Tajikistan) Davlat Boltaev	5
(Serbia) Sadam Magomedov	2

Round of 16
(Italy) Aziz Abbes Mouhiidine	4
(Ecuador) Julio Castillo	1
(Mexico) Carlos Rodríguez
(Tajikistan) Davlat Boltaev	RSC-I

Quarterfinals
(Italy) Aziz Abbes Mouhiidine	5
(Tajikistan) Davlat Boltaev	0

==== Section 4 ====
Round of 64
(Azerbaijan) Eldar Guliyev	0
(Jordan) Ahmad Al-Teimat	4

Round of 32
(Armenia) Narek Manasyan	RSC
(Democratic Republic of the Congo) William Mukewa
(Kyrgyzstan) Bakyt Toktosun Uulu	0
(Iran) Pouria Amiri	5
(India) Naveen Kumar	5
(South Korea) Jeong Jae-min	0
(Jordan) Ahmad Al-Teimat	0
(Spain) Enmanuel Reyes	5

Round of 16
(Armenia) Narek Manasyan	5
(Iran) Pouria Amiri	0
(India) Naveen Kumar	0
(Spain) Enmanuel Reyes	5

Quarterfinals
(Armenia) Narek Manasyan	4
(Spain) Enmanuel Reyes	0
