= 2021 AIBA World Boxing Championships – Heavyweight =

Heavyweight at the 2021 AIBA World Boxing Championships
- Venue: Štark Arena
- Location: Belgrade, Serbia
- Dates: 26 October – 6 November
- Competitors: 38 from 38 nations

Medalists
gold medal	Julio César La Cruz	Cuba
silver medal	Aziz Abbes Mouhiidine	Italy
bronze medal	Madiyar Saydrakhimov	Uzbekistan
bronze medal	Enmanuel Reyes	Spain

The heavyweight competition at the 2021 AIBA World Boxing Championships was held between 26 October and 6 November.

== Results ==
=== Finals ===
Semifinals
(Cuba) Julio César La Cruz	5
(Uzbekistan) Madiyar Saydrakhimov	0
(Italy) Aziz Abbes Mouhiidine	4
(Spain) Enmanuel Reyes	1

Final
(Cuba) Julio César La Cruz	4
(Italy) Aziz Abbes Mouhiidine	1

=== Top half ===
==== Section 1 ====
First round
(Serbia) Sadam Magomedov	4
(Turkey) Emir Büyükdağ	0

Second round
(Brazil) Abner Teixeira	1
(Serbia) Sadam Magomedov	4
(Bosnia and Herzegovina) Džemal Bošnjak	5
(Lithuania) Simonas Urbonavičius	0
(Austria) Aleksandar Mraovic	1
(Iran) Toufan Sharifi	4
(Cuba) Julio César La Cruz	5
(Bulgaria) Radoslav Pantaleev	0

Third round
(Serbia) Sadam Magomedov	5
(Bosnia and Herzegovina) Džemal Bošnjak	0
(Iran) Toufan Sharifi	0
(Cuba) Julio César La Cruz	5

Quarterfinals
(Serbia) Sadam Magomedov	0
(Cuba) Julio César La Cruz	5

==== Section 2 ====
First round
(England) Lewis Williams	5
(Azerbaijan) Rauf Rahimov	0
(Belarus) Uladzislau Smiahlikau	5
(Kenya) Joshua Wasike	0

Second round
(Albania) Indrit Laci	0
(England) Lewis Williams	5
(Slovenia) Aljaž Ban	1
(Ukraine) Robert Marton	4
(Poland) Mateusz Bereźnicki	1
(Kazakhstan) Aibek Oralbay	4
(Belarus) Uladzislau Smiahlikau	0
(Uzbekistan) Madiyar Saydrakhimov	5

Third round
(England) Lewis Williams	3
(Ukraine) Robert Marton	2
(Kazakhstan) Aibek Oralbay	1
(Uzbekistan) Madiyar Saydrakhimov	4

Quarterfinals
(England) Lewis Williams	0
(Uzbekistan) Madiyar Saydrakhimov	5

=== Bottom half ===
==== Section 3 ====
First round
(Italy) Aziz Abbes Mouhiidine	5
(Armenia) Narek Manasyan	0
(Luxembourg) Michel Erpelding	0
(Georgia (country)) Giorgi Tchigladze	5

Second round
(Croatia) Toni Filipi	0
(Italy) Aziz Abbes Mouhiidine	5
(Ecuador) Julio Castillo	5
(Kyrgyzstan) Rustam Yrysbek Uulu	0
Andrei Stotskii	1
(India) Sanjeet Kumar	4
(Georgia (country)) Giorgi Tchigladze	5
(Germany) Dariusz Lassotta	0

Third round
(Italy) Aziz Abbes Mouhiidine	5
(Ecuador) Julio Castillo	0
(India) Sanjeet Kumar	4
(Georgia (country)) Giorgi Tchigladze	1

Quarterfinals
(Italy) Aziz Abbes Mouhiidine	5
(India) Sanjeet Kumar	0

==== Section 4 ====
First round
(Spain) Enmanuel Reyes	4
(Greece) Vagkan Nanitzanian	1

Second round
Abdul Qadir Ghafar	1
(Moldova) Andrei Zaplitnîi	4
(Tajikistan) Parviz Karimov	0
(United States) Jamar Talley	5
(Slovakia) Dávid Michálek	0
(Jordan) Hussein Ishaish	5
(Spain) Enmanuel Reyes	5
(France) Soheb Bouafia	0

Third round
(Moldova) Andrei Zaplitnîi	0
(United States) Jamar Talley	5
(Jordan) Hussein Ishaish	0
(Spain) Enmanuel Reyes	5

Quarterfinals
(United States) Jamar Talley	1
(Spain) Enmanuel Reyes	4
