= 2019 AIBA World Boxing Championships – Heavyweight =

Heavyweight at the 2019 AIBA World Boxing Championships
- Venue: Ekaterinburg Expo
- Location: Yekaterinburg, Russia
- Dates: 10–21 September
- Competitors: 42 from 42 nations

Medalists
gold medal	Muslim Gadzhimagomedov	Russia
silver medal	Julio Castillo	Ecuador
bronze medal	Radoslav Pantaleev	Bulgaria
bronze medal	Vassiliy Levit	Kazakhstan

The Heavyweight competition at the 2019 AIBA World Boxing Championships was held from 10 to 21 September 2019.

== Schedule ==
The schedule was as follows:

Date	Time	Round
Tuesday 10 September 2019	17:15 (Ring A); 17:00 (Ring B)	First round
Sunday 15 September 2019	17:00; 21:00	Second round
Tuesday 17 September 2019	17:00	Third round
Wednesday 18 September 2019	16:30	Quarterfinals
Friday 20 September 2019	16:30	Semifinals
Saturday 21 September 2019	20:15	Final

All times are Yekaterinburg Time (UTC+5)

== Results ==
=== Finals ===
Semi-finals
(Bulgaria) Radoslav Pantaleev	0
(Russia) Muslim Gadzhimagomedov	5
(Kazakhstan) Vassiliy Levit	2
(Ecuador) Julio Castillo	3

Final
(Russia) Muslim Gadzhimagomedov	5
(Ecuador) Julio Castillo	0

=== Top half ===
==== Section 1 ====
First round
(Romania) Cristian Filip	2
(Georgia (country)) Nikoloz Begadze	3
(Republic of Ireland) Kirill Afanasev	5
(Australia) Austin Aokuso	0
(Croatia) Toni Filipi	2
(Lithuania) Tadas Tamašauskas	3

Second round
(Cuba) Erislandy Savón	5
(Georgia (country)) Nikoloz Begadze	0
(Democratic Republic of the Congo) Jonathan Kogasso	1
(Sweden) Alexander Bwambale	4
(Bulgaria) Radoslav Pantaleev	4
(Republic of Ireland) Kirill Afanasev	1
(Lithuania) Tadas Tamašauskas	4
(Morocco) Youness Baalla	1

Third round
(Cuba) Erislandy Savón	5
(Sweden) Alexander Bwambale	0
(Bulgaria) Radoslav Pantaleev	3
(Lithuania) Tadas Tamašauskas	2

Quarterfinals
(Cuba) Erislandy Savón	0
(Bulgaria) Radoslav Pantaleev	5

==== Section 2 ====
First round
(Poland) Michał Soczyński	1
(Turkey) Berat Acar	4
(Belgium) Victor Schelstraete	KO
(Israel) Kostiantyn Pinchuk

Second round
(Russia) Muslim Gadzhimagomedov	5
(Turkey) Berat Acar	0
(New Zealand) David Nyika	5
(Austria) Ahmed Hagag	0
(United States) Adrian Tillman
(Armenia) Henrik Sargsyan	w/o
(Belgium) Victor Schelstraete	0
(England) Cheavon Clarke	5

Third round
(Russia) Muslim Gadzhimagomedov	5
(New Zealand) David Nyika	0
(Armenia) Henrik Sargsyan	1
(England) Cheavon Clarke	3

Quarterfinals
(Russia) Muslim Gadzhimagomedov	5
(England) Cheavon Clarke	0

=== Bottom half ===
==== Section 3 ====
First round
(Mongolia) Sandagsürengiin Erdenebayar	1
(Slovakia) Dávid Michálek	4
(Germany) Ammar Abduljabbar	4
(South Korea) Ju Tae-ung	1

Second round
(Kazakhstan) Vassiliy Levit	5
(Slovakia) Dávid Michálek	0
(Azerbaijan) Ismayil Yagubov	1
(Ukraine) Marat Hryhorian	4
(Italy) Aziz Mouhiidine	0
(Jordan) Hussein Ishaish	5
(Germany) Ammar Abduljabbar	4
(Algeria) Abdelhafid Benchabla	1

Third round
(Kazakhstan) Vassiliy Levit	5
(Ukraine) Marat Hryhorian	0
(Jordan) Hussein Ishaish	5
(Germany) Ammar Abduljabbar	0

Quarterfinals
(Kazakhstan) Vassiliy Levit	4
(Jordan) Hussein Ishaish	1

==== Section 4 ====
First round
(Egypt) Youssef Ali Karar	0
(China) Remula Abudurexiti	5
(Iraq) Saadi Rabeah	2
(Iran) Mohammad Shourian	3
(Colombia) Deivi Julio	0
(Brazil) Abner Teixeira	5

Second round
(Ecuador) Julio Castillo	5
(China) Remula Abudurexiti	0
(Iran) Mohammad Shourian	0
(Hungary) Ádám Hámori	5
(India) Sanjeet Sanjeet	4
(Scotland) Scott Forrest	1
(Brazil) Abner Teixeira	0
(Uzbekistan) Sanjar Tursunov	5

Third round
(Ecuador) Julio Castillo	5
(Hungary) Ádám Hámori	0
(India) Sanjeet Sanjeet	4
(Uzbekistan) Sanjar Tursunov	1

Quarterfinals
(Ecuador) Julio Castillo	4
(India) Sanjeet Sanjeet	1
