= Jack Marley (boxer) =

Irish boxer (born 2002)

Jack Marley OLY
Personal information
- Full name: Jack Michael Marley
- Born: 16 November 2002 (age 23) Sallynoggin, Ireland
- Height: 186 cm (6 ft 1 in)

Sport
- Sport: Boxing
- Weight class: Heavyweight
- Club: Monkstown Boxing Club
Medal record
Men's amateur boxing
Representing Ireland
European Games
Silver medal – second place	2023 Kraków-Małopolska	Heavyweight
European U22 Boxing Championships
Gold medal – first place	2022 Poreč Croatia	Heavyweight
Bronze medal – third place	2021 Roseto degli Abruzzi Italy	Heavyweight

Jack Michael Marley OLY (born 16 November 2002) is an Irish amateur boxer who won a gold medal at heavyweight at the 2022 European Under-22 Championships and silver at the 2023 European Games. He represented Ireland at the 2024 Summer Olympics.

== Career ==
Having started boxing aged 8 at Monkstown Boxing Club in Dublin, Marley was 11 when he claimed his first Irish age-group title and was still just 18 when he won a bronze medal in the heavyweight division at the 2021 European Under-22 Championships in Roseto degli Abruzzi, Italy.

He was invited to join the Irish Amateur Boxing Association elite training group in May 2021, before winning his first national elite title in October 2021, beating Marcin Skalski by unanimous decision and becoming the second youngest-ever champion in the heavyweight category.

Marley took gold at the next European under-22s held in Poreč, Croatia, in March 2022, defeating Italy's Roberto Lizzi via unanimous decision in the final.

In May 2022, he made his senior international debut at the European Amateur Boxing Championships in Armenia but lost in his opening fight against Greece's Vagkan Nanitzanian when an accidental clash of heads in round two caused a cut above Marley's eye leading to an early stoppage and a defeat on points.

Marley won a silver medal at the 2023 European Games in Kraków, Poland, losing to Aziz Abbes Mouhiidine from Italy in the final but securing his place at the 2024 Summer Olympics in the process. The result made him the first Irish heavyweight medalist at a major championships since Gearóid Ó Colmáin won the European title in 1947. He also became the first heavyweight from his country to reach an Olympics since Cathal O'Grady in 1996.

Following a public vote, Marley was named the 2023 Irish Boxing Amateur Boxer of the Year.

In February 2024, Marley won a bronze medal at the prestigious Strandja Memorial Tournament in Sofia, Bulgaria.

Two months later, at the 2024 European Amateur Boxing Championships in Belgrade, Serbia, he went out in the first round, losing via split decision to Belgian fighter Victor Schelstraete.

Marley's Olympic place was officially confirmed when Ireland named their boxing team on 28 June 2024. He was drawn to fight Mateusz Bereźnicki from Poland in his first contest, which he won by 4:1 split decision. Marley lost in the quarter-finals via a 4:1 split decision to 2022 Asian Games gold medalist Davlat Boltaev of Tajikistan.

He was selected to represent Ireland in the 90 kg category at the World Championships in Liverpool, England, in September 2025, where he lost his first bout to Kazakhstan's Sagyndyk Togambay.

At the 2026 European Championships in Sofia, Bulgaria, Marley competed for Ireland in the 90 kg division. He defeated Refugee team boxer Aryan Saed Panah 3:2 in his opening bout, before losing to Georgia's Georgii Kushitashvili by 4:1 in the quarter-finals.
