= Boxing at the 2023 European Games – Men's heavyweight =

Men's heavyweight boxing at the 2023 European Games
- Venue: Nowy Targ Arena
- Location: Nowy Targ, Poland
- Dates: 24 June – 1 July
- Competitors: 24 from 24 nations

Medalists
gold medal	Aziz Abbes Mouhiidine	Italy
silver medal	Jack Marley	Ireland
bronze medal	Mateusz Bereźnicki	Poland
bronze medal	Enmanuel Reyes	Spain

The men's heavyweight boxing event at the 2023 European Games was held between 24 June and 1 July 2023.

== Results ==
=== Finals ===
Semi-finals
Jack Marley (IRL)	4
Enmanuel Reyes (ESP)	1
Mateusz Bereźnicki (POL)	0
Aziz Abbes Mouhiidine (ITA)	5

Final
Jack Marley (IRL)	0
Aziz Abbes Mouhiidine (ITA)	5

=== Top half ===
==== Section 1 ====
Round of 32
Džemal Bošnjak (BIH)	0
Marko Čalić (CRO)	5
Michel Erpelding (LUX)
Vagkan Nanitzanian (GRE)	RSC

Round of 16
Simonas Urbonavičius (LTU)	0
Marko Čalić (CRO)	5
Vagkan Nanitzanian (GRE)	1
Jack Marley (IRL)	4

Quarterfinals
Marko Čalić (CRO)	1
Jack Marley (IRL)	4

==== Section 2 ====
Round of 32
Soheb Bouafia (FRA)	1
Enmanuel Reyes (ESP)	4
Gelian Rojku (ALB)	0
Alexander Okafor (GER)	5

Round of 16
Narek Manasyan (ARM)	0
Enmanuel Reyes (ESP)	5
Alexander Okafor (GER)	5
Dávid Michálek (SVK)	0

Quarterfinals
Enmanuel Reyes (ESP)	5
Alexander Okafor (GER)	0

=== Bottom half ===
==== Section 3 ====
Round of 32
Mateusz Bereźnicki (POL)	5
Pavol Hrivňák (CZE)	0
Loren Alfonso (AZE)	1
Yan Zak (ISR)	4

Round of 16
Levente Kiss (HUN)	2
Mateusz Bereźnicki (POL)	3
Yan Zak (ISR)	4
Andrei Zaplitnîi (MDA)	1

Quarterfinals
Mateusz Bereźnicki (POL)	5
Yan Zak (ISR)	0

==== Section 4 ====
Round of 32
Arkadii Kartsan (UKR)	5
Artyom Yordanyan (GEO)	0
Lewis Williams (GBR)	ABD
Taulant Jakupi (KOS)

Round of 16
Aziz Abbes Mouhiidine (ITA)	5
Arkadii Kartsan (UKR)	0
Lewis Williams (GBR)	2
Berat Acar (TUR)	3

Quarterfinals
Aziz Abbes Mouhiidine (ITA)	5
Berat Acar (TUR)	0
