= Jack Marley =

Jack Marley may refer to

- Jack Marley (boxer) (born 2002), an Irish amateur boxer
- a minor fictional character in several episodes of The Simpsons
