= 2022 IBA Women's World Boxing Championships – Light heavyweight =

Light heavyweight at the 2022 IBA Women's World Boxing Championships
- Venue: Başakşehir Youth and Sports Facility
- Location: Istanbul, Turkey
- Dates: 13–19 May
- Competitors: 11 from 11 nations

Medalists
gold medal	Gabrielė Stonkutė	Lithuania
silver medal	Oliwia Toborek	Poland
bronze medal	Jessica Bagley	Australia
bronze medal	Elif Güneri	Turkey

The light heavyweight competition at the 2022 IBA Women's World Boxing Championships was held from 13 to 19 May 2022.

== Results ==
Round of 16
(India) Pooja Rani	5
(Hungary) Tímea Nagy	0
(Turkey) Elif Güneri	4
(South Africa) Mkateko Sithole	0
(Ukraine) Olesia Krysiuk	0
(Kazakhstan) Gulsaya Yerzhan	5

Quarter-finals
(Australia) Jessica Bagley	3
(India) Pooja Rani	2
(Poland) Oliwia Toborek	3
(Romania) Alexandra Petcu	0
(Kenya) Elizabeth Andiego	0
(Turkey) Elif Güneri	5
(Kazakhstan) Gulsaya Yerzhan	0
(Lithuania) Gabrielė Stonkutė	5

Semi-finals
(Australia) Jessica Bagley	2
(Poland) Oliwia Toborek	3
(Turkey) Elif Güneri	2
(Lithuania) Gabrielė Stonkutė	3

Final
(Poland) Oliwia Toborek	0
(Lithuania) Gabrielė Stonkutė	5
