= Oliwia Toborek =

Polish boxer (born 2002)

Personal information
- Born: 11 May 2002 (age 24) Warsaw, Poland
- Weight: Light-heavyweight

Boxing career
Medal record
Women's amateur boxing
Representing Poland
World Championships
Silver medal – second place	2022 Istanbul	Light-heavyweight
European U22 Championships
Gold medal – first place	2022 Poreč	Light-heavyweight
Bronze medal – third place	2024 Sofia	Middleweight

Oliwia Toborek (born 11 May 2002 in Warsaw) is a Polish amateur boxer who won a silver medal at the 2022 World Championships.

== Biography ==
Toborek won a silver medal at the 2022 IBA Women's World Boxing Championships after losing to Gabrielė Stonkutė in the final.
