= Boxing at the 2022 Asian Games – Men's 92 kg =

Boxing competitions

Men's 92 kg at the 2022 Asian Games
- Venue: Hangzhou Gymnasium
- Date: 27 September – 3 October 2023
- Competitors: 13 from 13 nations

Medalists
| gold medal | Davlat Boltaev | Tajikistan |
| silver medal | Han Xuezhen | China |
| bronze medal | Sagyndyk Togambay | Kazakhstan |
| bronze medal | Jeong Jae-min | South Korea |

The men's 92 kilograms event at the 2022 Asian Games took place from 27 September to 3 October 2023 at Hangzhou Gymnasium, Hangzhou, China.

== Schedule ==
All times are China Standard Time (UTC+08:00)

| Date | Time | Event |
|---|---|---|
| Wednesday, 27 September 2023 | 14:00 | Preliminaries – R16 |
| Friday, 29 September 2023 | 14:00 | Quarterfinals |
| Sunday, 1 October 2023 | 14:00 | Semifinals |
| Tuesday, 3 October 2023 | 19:00 | Final |

== Results ==
Legend

- KO — Won by knockout
- RSC — Won by referee stop contest
- RSCI — Won by referee stop contest injury

Preliminaries – R16
Sanjeet Kumar (IND) | 0
Lazizbek Mullojonov (UZB) | 5
Sagyndyk Togambay (KAZ) | RSCI
Dorjiin Bariakhaan (MGL)
Odai Al-Hindawi (JOR) | 1
Toufan Sharifi (IRI) | 4
John Marvin (PHI) | RSC
Rabin Nepal (NEP)
Arslanbek Açilow (TKM)
Davlat Boltaev (TJK) | RSC

Quarterfinals
Han Xuezhen (CHN) | 4
Lazizbek Mullojonov (UZB) | 1
Sagyndyk Togambay (KAZ) | KO
Toufan Sharifi (IRI)
Jeong Jae-min (KOR) | RSC
John Marvin (PHI)
Davlat Boltaev (TJK) | 4
Erkin Adylbek Uulu (KGZ) | 0

Semifinals
Han Xuezhen (CHN) | 5
Sagyndyk Togambay (KAZ) | 0
Jeong Jae-min (KOR) | 0
Davlat Boltaev (TJK) | 5

Final
Han Xuezhen (CHN) | 2
Davlat Boltaev (TJK) | 3
