= Muslim Gadzhimagomedov =

Russian boxer (born 1997)

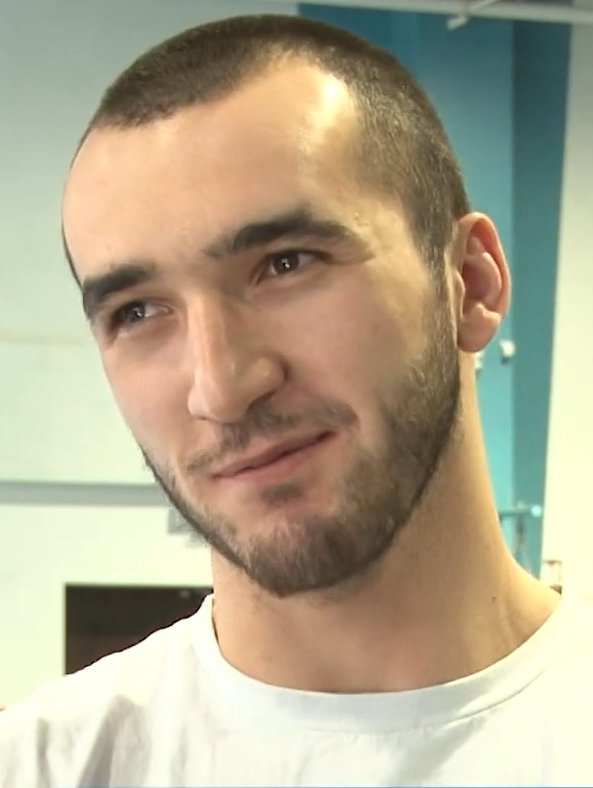
- Gadzhimagomedov in January 2019

Personal information
- Born: Muslim Gamzatovich Gadzhimagomedov; 14 January 1997 (age 29) Nitilsukh, Dagestan, Russia
- Height: 6 ft 4 1/2 in (194 cm)
- Weight: Cruiserweight; Bridgerweight

Boxing career
- Stance: Orthodox

Boxing record
- Total fights: 6
- Wins: 6
- Win by KO: 3
Medal record
Men's amateur boxing
Representing (Russia) ROC
Olympic Games
Silver medal – second place	2020 Tokyo	Heavyweight
Representing Russia
IBA World Championships
Gold medal – first place	2019 Yekaterinburg	Heavyweight
Gold medal – first place	2023 Tashkent	Heavyweight
Gold medal – first place	2025 Dubai	Heavyweight
European Games
Gold medal – first place	2019 Minsk	Heavyweight
European Championships
Gold medal – first place	2019 Minsk	Heavyweight
Gold medal – first place	2024 Belgrade	Heavyweight
Silver medal – second place	2017 Kharkiv	Light heavyweight

Muslim Gamzatovich Gadzhimagomedov (Russian: Муслим Гамзатович Гаджимагомедов; born 14 January 1997) is a Russian professional boxer who held the World Boxing Association (WBA) bridgerweight title from 2024 to 2026. As an amateur, he won a gold medal at the 2019 World Championships and 2019 European Games. Gadzhimagomedov also won silver medals at both the 2020 Summer Olympics and 2017 European Championships.

== Amateur career ==
=== Olympic result ===
Tokyo 2020

- Round of 16: Defeated Abdelhafid Benchabla (Algeria) 5–0
- Quarter-finals: Defeated Ammar Abduljabbar (Germany) 5–0
- Semi-finals: Defeated David Nyika (New Zealand) 4–1
- Final: Defeated by Julio César La Cruz (Cuba) 5–0

=== World Championship results ===
Hamburg 2017

- First round: Defeated Jeysson Monroy (Colombia) 5–0
- Round of 16: Defeated by Bektemir Melikuziev (Uzbekistan) 4–1

Yekaterinburg 2019

- Round of 32: Defeated Berat Acar (Turkey) 5–0
- Round of 16: Defeated David Nyika (New Zealand) 5–0
- Quarter-finals: Defeated Cheavon Clarke (England) 5–0
- Semi–finals: Defeated Radoslav Pantaleev (Bulgaria) 5–0
- Final: Defeated Julio Castillo (Ecuador) 5–0

=== European Games result ===
Minsk 2019

- Round of 16: Defeated Victor Schelstraete (Belgium) 5–0
- Quarter-finals: Defeated Aziz Mouhiidine (Italy) 5–0
- Semi–finals: Defeated Toni Filipi (Croatia) 5–0
- Final: Defeated Uladzislau Smiahlikau (Belarus) 5–0

== Professional career ==
Gadzhimagomedov made his professional debut on 24 December 2021, against Deibis Berrocal. He won by stoppage after knocking his opponent down three times in the second round.

He won the inaugural WBA bridgerweight title by stopping Zhaoxin Zhang in the fourth round of their fight at the IBA Coliseum in Serpukhov, Russia, on 12 July 2024. Evgeny Tishchenko had technically won the inaugural title the previous year, but a failed drug test rendered his bout a No Contest and his championship recognition was annulled.

Gadzhimagomedov made a successful first defense of his title with a unanimous decision win over Leon Harth at Ufa Arena in Ufa, Russia, on 17 October 2024.

He defeated Thabiso Mchunu via unanimous decision in a 10 round, non-title contest at the International Boxing Centre Luzhniki in Moscow, Russia, on 31 January 2025.

== Professional boxing record ==
6 fights	6 wins	0 losses
By knockout	3	0
By decision	3	0

No.	Result	Record	Opponent	Type	Round, time	Date	Location	Notes
6	Win	6–0	Thabiso Mchunu	UD	10	31 Jan 2025	International Boxing Centre Luzhniki, Moscow, Russia	
5	Win	5–0	Leon Harth	UD	12	17 Oct 2024	Ufa Arena, Ufa, Russia	Retained WBA bridgerweight title
4	Win	4–0	Zhaoxin Zhang	TKO	4 (12), 2:50	12 Jul 2024	IBA Coliseum, Serpukhov, Russia	Won vacant WBA bridgerweight title
3	Win	3–0	Artur Mann	RTD	8 (10), 3:00	9 Dec 2023	Agenda Arena, Dubai, United Arab Emirates	
2	Win	2–0	Akani Phuzi	UD	8	27 Oct 2023	Dushanbe, Tajikistan	
1	Win	1–0	Deibis Berrocal	KO	2 (6), 2:54	24 Dec 2021	Soviet Wings Sport Palace, Moscow, Russia	

== Professional IBA record ==
2 fights	2 wins	0 losses
By decision	2	0

No	Result	Record	Opponent	Type	Round, time	Date	Location	Notes
2	Win	2-0	Julio Cesar La Cruz	UD	5	26 August 2023	Serpukhov, Russia	
1	Win	1-0	Enmanuel Reyes	UD	5	11 December 2022	Abu Dhabi, United Arab Emirates	

Sporting positions
World boxing titles
Inaugural champion	WBA bridgerweight champion 12 Jul 2024 – 30 Jun 2026; Weight class discontinued	Title discontinued
