= Gabrielė Stonkutė =

Lithuanian boxer (born 2001)

Personal information
- Nationality: Lithuanian
- Born: April 18, 2001 (age 25) Kretinga, Lithuania
- Weight: Light heavyweight

Boxing career
Medal record
Women's amateur boxing
Representing Lithuania
World Championships
Gold medal – first place	2022 Istanbul	Light heavyweight
European Championships
Gold medal – first place	2022 Budva	Light heavyweight
European U22 Championships
Silver medal – second place	2021 Roseto	Middleweight
Bronze medal – third place	2022 Poreč	Light heavyweight
European Youth Championships
Gold medal – first place	2019 Sofia	Middleweight

Gabrielė Stonkutė (born 18 April 2001) is a Lithuanian female boxer and 2022 IBA light heavyweight world champion.

== Biography ==
Stonkūtė was awarded with the Lithuanian Female Boxer of the Year 2021 award.

At the 2022 IBA Women's World Boxing Championships Stonkutė competed in the light heavyweight division. In the quarterfinals Stonkutė defeated Kazakh boxer Gulsaya Yerzhan to secure Lithuania's first-ever medal at the world championships, then defeated Polish boxer Oliwia Toborek in the final by 5-0 unanimous decision to become the first Lithuanian world champion in Olympic-style boxing.
