= Han Xuezhen =

Chinese boxer (born 1999)

Personal information
- Born: 28 April 1999 (age 27) Qi County, Kaifeng, Henan, China
- Height: 185 cm (6 ft 1 in)

Boxing career
- Weight class: Heavyweight
- Stance: Orthodox
Medal record
Men's Amateur Boxing
Representing China
Asian Games
Silver medal – second place	2022 Hangzhou	Heavyweight

Han Xuezhen (Chinese: 韩雪振; pinyin: Hánxuězhèn; born 28 April 1999) is a Chinese boxer. He won a silver medal in the 92 kg event of the 2022 Asian Games.

== Background ==
Han is from Qi County, Kaifeng, Henan province. At the age of 12, he joined Tagou Martial Arts School but unlike his peers who focused on sanda, he chose to pick up boxing instead. In 2015, the school selected him to join the Henan provincial boxing team.

== Career ==
In May 2023, Han participated in the Heavyweight event of the 2023 IBA Men's World Boxing Championships. He defeated Marko Čalić before losing to Muslim Gadzhimagomedov in the round of 16.

In October 2023, Han participated in the 92 kg event at the 2022 Asian Games. He reached the final where he lost to Davlat Boltaev. He obtained a silver medal and qualified for the 2024 Summer Olympics.
