= Madiyar Saydrakhimov =

Uzbekistani boxer

Saydrakhimov Madiyar
Personal information
- Born: August 19, 1997 (age 28) Gazalkent, Tashkent, Uzbekistan
- Height: 188 cm (6 ft 2 in)
- Weight: Heavyweight

Boxing career
- Stance: Southpaw
Medal record
Men's amateur boxing
Representing Uzbekistan
World Championships
Bronze medal – third place	2021 Belgrade	Heavyweight
Military World Games
Gold medal – first place	2019 Wuhan	91 kg
Asian Championships
Silver medal – second place	2022 Amman	Heavyweight

Madiyar Saydrakhimov (Uzbek: Madiyor Saydrahimov, ru: Мадияр Надиярович Сайдрахимов) is an Uzbekistani boxer who competes in the light heavyweight and in the heavyweight category. He is a member of the national boxing team of Uzbekistan. He was bronze medalist at the World Championship (2021), champion at the World Military Games (2019), and has won multiple international and national amateur tournaments. He was a finalist at the team semi-professional tournament Boxing League Intercontinental Cup.

== Amateur career ==
In 2021 at AIBA World Boxing Championships he became the bronze medalist in the category up to 92 kg. In February 2022, he became the champion in the heavyweight category of the international tournament Strandja 2022 that held in Sofia (Bulgaria).

2021 AIBA World Boxing Championships results

Round of 32: Defeated Uladzislau Smiahlikau (Belarus) 5-0

Round of 16: Defeated Aibek Oralbay (Kazakhstan) 5-0

Quarter-finals: Defeated Lewis Williams (England) 5-0

Semi-finals: Defeated by Julio César La Cruz (Cuba) 0-5

In February 2022, he became the winner in the weight category up to 92 kg of the prestigious international tournament "Strandzha" (English) that held in Sofia (Bulgaria), in the final, defeating the experienced Bulgarian boxer Radoslav Pantaleev on points

== Professional career ==
In 2017 on 14 October he made his first professional boxing debut in Kuala Lumpur Malaysia against Romans Seredjuks and he won the bout by unanimous decision of the judges (score: 39-37, 40-36, 40-36)

1 fight	1 win	0 losses
By knockout	0	0
By decision	1	0
