= Mateusz Bereźnicki =

Polish boxer (born 2001)

Personal information
- Born: 10 March 2001 (age 25) Wałbrzych, Poland
- Height: 6 ft 6 in (198 cm)
- Weight: Cruiserweight

Boxing career
- Reach: N/A
- Stance: Orthodox

Boxing record
- Total fights: 6
- Wins: 6
- Win by KO: 2
- Losses: 0
- Draws: 0
- No contests: 0
Medal record
Representing Poland
Men's amateur boxing
European Games
Bronze medal – third place	2023 Kraków-Małopolska	Heavyweight
European U22 Boxing Championships
Bronze medal – third place	2021 Roseto	Heavyweight
Polish National Championships
Gold medal – first place	2020 Wałcz	Heavyweight
Gold medal – first place	2021 Wałbrzych	Heavyweight
Gold medal – first place	2022 Zabrze	Heavyweight
Gold medal – first place	2024 Wałbrzych	Heavyweight
Gold medal – first place	2025 Gdańsk	Heavyweight

Mateusz Piotr Bereźnicki (born 10 March 2001) is a Polish professional boxer. He won a bronze medal at the 2023 European Games, and the 2021 European U22 Boxing Championships. He competed at the 2024 Summer Olympics.

== Amateur career ==
=== Polish National Championships ===
Bereźnicki won a gold medal at the 2020 Polish National Championships after defeating Tomasz Niedźwiecki in the final. He won his second gold medal the following year after defeating Mateusz Kubiszyn in the final. Bereźnicki won his third consecutive gold medal in 2022 after defeating Kamil Ślendak in the final. After not competing in 2023, he returned in 2024, winning his fourth gold medal after defeating Adam Tutak in the final. Bereźnicki won his fifth gold medal in 2025 after defeating Alexey Sevostyanov in the final.

=== European U22 Boxing Championships ===
Bereźnicki competed at the 2021 European U22 Boxing Championships in Roseto, Italy. He made it to the semifinals, where lost to Vladimir Uzunyan. Despite the loss, Bereźnicki ended the championships with a bronze medal.

He then competed in the 2022 European U22 Boxing Championships in Poreč, Croatia. In the first round, he defeated Vitalii Stalchenko. In the next round, he lost to Jack Marley, eliminating him from medal contention.

=== 2023 European Games ===
Bereźnicki competed at the 2023 European Games. In the first round, he defeated Pavol Hrivňák. In the Round of 16, he defeated Levente Kiss. In the quarterfinals, he defeated Yan Zak. In the semifinals, he lost to Aziz Abbes Mouhiidine, eliminating him from directly qualifying for the 2024 Summer Olympics. Despite the loss, Bereźnicki ended the tournament with a bronze medal.

=== 2024 Summer Olympics ===
==== Qualification ====
Bereźnicki competed in the 2024 World Boxing Olympic Qualification Tournament 1 to qualify for the 2024 Summer Olympics. He started the tournament from the second round, which he defeated Joseph Kostúr to advance. In the third round, he defeated Soheb Bouafia. In the final qualifying bout, he lost to Patrick Brown.

Bereźnicki competed in the 2024 World Boxing Olympic Qualification Tournament 2 for a second chance to qualify for the 2024 Summer Olympics. In the first round, he defeated Adrian Paoletti. In the second round, he defeated Peter Abuti Alwanga. In the third round, he defeated Alexander Okafor. In the final round, he defeated Daniel Guzmán to qualify for his first Olympic Tournament.

==== Olympic Games ====
In the first round, he faced Jack Marley. Bereźnicki lost the fight 4-1, ending his Olympic tournament early.

== Professional career ==
Bereźnicki made his professional debut on November 16, 2024, against Paweł Strykowski. Bereźnicki won the fight via a first-round corner retirement.

His next fight came on February 1, 2025, against Twon Smith. This marked Bereźnicki's first fight in the United States. Bereźnicki won the fight via a Unanimous Decision.

His next fight came on May 25, 2025, against Dariusz Skop, this time returning to his native Poland. Bereźnicki won the fight via a Unanimous Decision.

His next fight came on November 22, 2025, against Dmitrii Cosciug. Bereźnicki won the fight via a Unanimous Decision.

== Professional boxing record ==
6 fights	6 wins	0 losses
By knockout	2	0
By decision	4	0

No.	Result	Record	Opponent	Type	Round, time	Date	Location	Notes
6	Win	6–0	Omar Garcia	TKO	5 (6), 1:36	24 Oct 2026	Nosalowy Dwór, Zakopane, Poland	
5	Win	5–0	Cristian Lopez	UD	6	15 Mar 2026	Hala Widowiskowo-Sportowa, Jastrzębie-Zdrój, Poland	
4	Win	4–0	Dmitrii Cosciug	UD	4	22 Nov 2025	Hala MOSiR, Chełm, Poland	
3	Win	3–0	Dariusz Skop	UD	4	25 May 2025	Arena Kalisz, Kalisz, Poland	
2	Win	2–0	Twon Smith	UD	4	1 Feb 2025	Prudential Center, Newark, New Jersey, U.S.	
1	Win	1–0	Paweł Strykowski	RTD	1 (4), 3:00	16 Nov 2024	KGHM Arena Ślęza Wrocław, Wrocław, Poland	
