= Michał Soczyński =

Polish boxer (born 1998)

Personal information
- Nickname: Soczek
- Born: 6 July 1998 (age 28) Lublin, Poland
- Height: 6 ft 3 in (191 cm)
- Weight: Cruiserweight

Boxing career
- Reach: 77 in (196 cm)
- Stance: Orthodox

Boxing record
- Total fights: 11
- Wins: 11
- Win by KO: 8
- Losses: 1

Michał Soczyński (born 6 July 1998) is a Polish professional boxer.

== Professional career ==
Soczyński made his professional debut on July 24, 2021 against Matt Sen. Soczyński won the fight via a first-round TKO.

His next fight came on November 12, 2021, against Aloys Youmbi. Soczyński won the fight via a Points Decision.

His next fight came on March 5, 2022, against Adam Kolarik. Soczyński won the fight via a Unanimous Decision.

Following a brief injury hiatus, he returned on September 17, 2022, against Adrian Valentin. Soczyński won the fight via a Unanimous Decision.

His next fight came on November 18, 2022, against Alessandro Jandejsek. Soczyński won the fight via a second-round knockout.

His next fight came on March 10, 2023, against Juan Carlos Rodriguez. Soczyński won the fight via a third-round corner retirement.

His next fight came on May 12, 2023, against Israel Duffus. Soczyński won the fight via a fourth-round corner retirement.

He faced Mariano Angel Gudino for the vacant IBO International and Republic of Poland International cruiserweight titles on November 25, 2023. Soczyński won the fight via a third-round TKO, winning his first two career championships in the process.

On December 31, 2024, it was announced that Soczyński has joined the Knockout Boxing Team, the biggest boxing team in Poland.

Following a two-year hiatus, he returned to the ring on February 1, 2025, against Demetrius Banks. Soczyński won the fight via a first-round TKO.

His next fight came on May 25, 2025, against Cristian Lopez. Soczyński won the fight via a third-round knockout.

His next fight came on October 4, 2025, against Tony Salam. Soczyński won the fight via a second-round knockout.

He faced undefeated fighter Ramazan Muslimov for the vacant WBC Baltic cruiserweight title on November 22, 2025. Muslimov knocked out Soczyński in the seventh round, which put an end to Soczyński's undefeated streak, with Muslimov becoming the new champion in the process. Following the knockout, Soczyński remained unconscious, and was transported immediately to a hospital where he was placed in a drug-induced coma to prevent any further damage. Soczyński was later awaken from the coma two days later, where he was stable and responsive.

== Professional boxing record ==
12 fights	11 wins	1 loss
By knockout	8	1
By decision	3	0

No.	Result	Record	Opponent	Type	Round, time	Date	Location	Notes
12	Loss	11–1	Ramazan Muslimov	KO	7 (10), 1:00	22 Nov 2025	Hala MOSiR, Chełm, Poland	For vacant WBC Baltic cruiserweight title.
11	Win	11–0	Tony Salam	KO	2 (6), 0:46	4 Oct 2025	Nosalowy Dwór, Zakopane, Poland	
10	Win	10–0	Cristian Lopez	KO	3 (8)	25 May 2025	Arena Kalisz, Kalisz, Poland	
9	Win	9–0	Demetrius Banks	TKO	1 (6), 2:07	1 Feb 2025	Prudential Center, Newark, New Jersey, U.S.	
8	Win	8–0	Mariano Angel Gudino	TKO	3 (10), 1:19	25 Nov 2023	Hala Sportowa, Pionki, Poland	Won vacant IBO International and Republic of Poland International cruiserweight titles.
7	Win	7–0	Israel Duffus	RTD	4 (6), 3:00	12 May 2023	York Hall, London, England	
6	Win	6–0	Juan Carlos Rodriguez	RTD	3 (6), 3:00	10 Mar 2023	Hala Osrodka Sportu i Rekreacji, ul. Strumykowa 1, Dzierżoniów, Poland	
5	Win	5–0	Alessandro Jandejsek	KO	2 (6), 0:59	18 Nov 2022	Grupa Azoty Arena, Puławy, Poland	
4	Win	4–0	Adrian Valentin	UD	6	17 Sep 2022	Miejska Hala Sportowa, Radomsko, Poland	
3	Win	3–0	Adam Kolarik	UD	6	5 Mar 2022	Hala Osrodka Sportu i Rekreacji, ul. Strumykowa 1, Dzierżoniów, Poland	
2	Win	2–0	Aloys Youmbi	PTS	4	12 Nov 2021	York Hall, London, England	
1	Win	1–0	Matt Sen	TKO	1 (6), 1:57	24 Jul 2021	Wembley Arena, London, England	
