= Vasyl Tkachuk =

Ukrainian writer and activist (1916–1944)

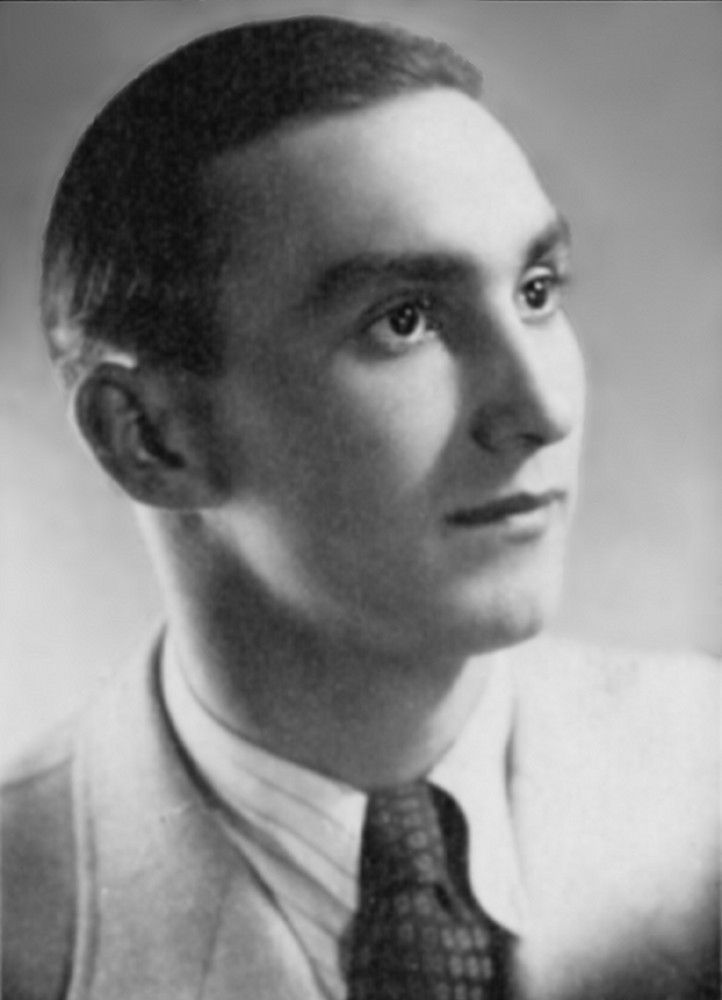
- Born: 13 January 1916 Illintsi, Galicia and Lodomeria, Austria-Hungary (now Ukraine)
- Died: 19 October 1944 (aged 28) East Prussia, Nazi Germany

Vasyl Ivanovych Tkachuk (Ukrainian: Василь Іванович Ткачук. 13 January 1916 – 19 October 1944) was a Ukrainian writer, poet, and activist.

== Biography ==
Vasyl Tkachuk was born in a very poor rural family to Ivan and Olena Tkachuk. He had two siblings, brother Oleksiy (born in 1904) and sister Mariya (born in 1912). Tkachuk's family lived in destitution, with a one chamber hut (about 16 m²) occupied by two families, ten people altogether. Following the deaths of Tkachuk's father and grandmother in 1921 the responsibility to provide for the family went to his mother, Olena.

In 1922 Tkachuk started his education in a local primary school, which he finished in 1930. During this period he wrote his first poems.

Tkachuk led an active life, both socially and politically. He was interested in ethnography; was a member of local choreographic group "Prosvita" (ukr.: Просвіта) and a member of "Sel-Rob Ednist" (ukr.: Сель-Pоб Єдність) political group. At the age of 15 Tkachuk was arrested for drawing a caricature of Józef Piłsudski, though he was later released due to his young age. He was again arrested in 1922 for propaganda against the szlachta.

In 1934 Tkachuk moved to Lviv where he published his novels in a local press. He was connected with a literary group of young writers and journalists called "The Twelve" (ukr.: "Дванадцятка"). In 1937 Tkachuk married Maria Janusz and 1938 their daughter Olha was born.

Following the Soviet annexation of Eastern Galicia and Volhynia, Tkachuk joined the Writer's Union of Ukraine, and became a student of Lviv University (ukr: Львівський університет). In 1941 Tkachuk joined Red Army and was killed during the East Prussian Offensive.

== Works ==
Rural families, their habits, culture, everyday life had a great influence on Tkachuk’s works, where he often described life of the local society. Tkachuk is compared to Vasyl Stefanyk for using Hutsul dialect in his works.

- 1933: Великдень іде
- 1935: Весілля на Покутті – published in "Життя і знання" magazine, No. 97 (10)
- 1935: Сині чічки, збірка новел (a collection of short stories)
- 1936: Золоті дзвінки, збірка новел (a collection of short stories)
- 1938: Зимова мелодія, збірка новел (a collection of short stories)
- 1940: Весна, збірка новел (a collection of short stories)
- 1973: Новели, збірка (a collection of short stories)

== Other sources ==
- Вільде, Ірина. Незбагненне серце. Львів: Каменяр, 1990. pp. 225–227.
- Гординський, Ярослав. Літературна критика підсовєтської україни. Львів-Київ, 1939.
- Грицков’ян, Ярослав. Українські письменники міжвоєнного двадцятиліття. Львів, 1994.
- Карманський, Петро. Українська богема. Львів: Олір, 1996. ISBN 5-7702-0985-2.
- Курдидик, Анатоль. Богдан з іншого боку. Спроба портрету цього мого близького друга. Терем: проблеми української культури. Детройт, 1971. No. 4. pp. 19–30
- Лучук, В. Письменник-демократ. Львів, 1973.
- Огієнко, Іван. Ткачук Василь: Зимова мелодія//Рідна мова. 1939.
- Рудницький М. Ткачук Василь: Весна// Література і мистецтво. 1940 No. 1.
- Хороб, Степан Іванович. Слово- образ- форма: у пошуках художності. Івано-Франківськ: Плай, 2000. ISBN 966-7365-68-9.
- Тарнавський, Остап. Літературний Львів 1939-1944. Львів: Просвіта, 1995.
