= Nitilsukh =

Nitilsukh Нитилсух НитӀицухъ
- Selo
- Location within Republic of Dagestan Location within Russia
- Coordinates: 42°02′N 46°25′E
- Country: Russia
- Region: Republic of Dagestan
- District: Tlyaratinsky District
- Time zone: UTC+3:00

Nitilsukh (Russian: Нитилсух; Avar: НитӀицухъ) is a rural locality (a selo) in Saniortinsky Selsoviet, Tlyaratinsky District, Republic of Dagestan, Russia. Population: 256 (2010 census); 180 (2002 census); 118 (1989 Soviet census).

== Geography ==
Nitilsukh is located 16 km southeast of Tlyarata (the district's administrative centre) by road. Saniorta and Rosnob are the nearest rural localities.
