= Makan Traoré =

French footballer (born 1992)

Personal information
- Date of birth: 26 May 1992 (age 34)
- Place of birth: Ivry-sur-Seine, France
- Height: 1.78 m (5 ft 10 in)
- Position: Left-back

Team information
- Current team: Olympique Alès

Youth career
- 2010–2011: Viry-Châtillon

Senior career*
Years	Team	Apps	(Gls)
2011–2012	Valenciennes B	29	(0)
2012–2014	Laval	29	(0)
2013–2014	Laval B	20	(0)
2014–2017	Paris Saint-Germain B	37	(0)
2017	Thonon Evian		
2017–2018	FC Miami City		
2018–2021	Bastia-Borgo	44	(1)
2021–2022	Versailles	17	(0)
2022–2024	Fleury	16	(0)
2024–	Olympique Alès	8	(0)

International career
2013	France U20	3	(0)
- * Club domestic league appearances and goals as of 14 December 2024

Makan Traoré (born 26 May 1992) is a French professional footballer who plays as a left-back for Championnat National 3 club Olympique Alès.

== Career ==
Makan Traoré was born in Ivry-sur-Seine, in the southeastern suburbs of Paris. He holds French and Malian nationalities.

In the summer of 2010 he joined Viry-Châtillon for a season before moving to Valenciennes, where he played only for the B team. In June 2012 he signed for Laval, on a three-year professional contract.

Traoré made his professional debut for Laval in the first Ligue 2 game of the 2012–13 season, playing 88 minutes of a 1–1 draw against his former club Châteauroux. Despite regular appearances in his first season at the club, he was given little playing time the following season, and on 10 June 2014 it was announced that he was leaving Laval.

In July 2014, Traoré signed a one-year professional contract with Paris Saint-Germain, to strengthen the club's B team. By 2017, Makan was third choice as in his left back position, and regularly trained with the professional group at the club, and subject of interest from clubs in England, Scotland and Belgium, but he was frustrated at the lack of opportunity to progress. He left the club without any deal, and signed short term for Régional 2 (level 7) side Thonon Evian in the autumn, before moving to the United States to play for FC Miami City in December 2017.

In December 2018 Traoré returned to France with Bastia-Borgo, signing initially until the end of the 2018–19 season. He went on to make 44 league appearances for the club before leaving at the end of the 2020–21 season.

In July 2021, Traoré signed for Championnat National 2 side Versailles. On 2 January 2022, he scored a "magnificent" volley goal in a Coupe de France match against La Roche.

In June 2022, Traoré signed with Fleury in Championnat National 2.

== Honours ==
Versailles

- Championnat National 2: 2021–22
