= Gradus Kraus =

Dutch boxer (born 2001)

- Born: Gradus Kraus; 12 July 2001 (age 25); Oss, Netherlands
- Other names: The Dancing Dutchman; The New KO King
- Nationality: Dutch
- Weight: 80 kg (180 lb; 13 st)
- Division: Light Heavyweight
- Style: Boxing
- Stance: Orthodox
- Fighting out of: Oss, Netherlands
- Trainer: Albert Kraus
- Years active: 2014–present

Professional boxing record
- Total: 12
- Wins: 12
- By knockout: 11
- Losses: 0

Amateur record
- Total: 41
- Wins: 23
- By knockout: 4
- Losses: 18
- By knockout: 0

Other information
- Notable relatives: Albert Kraus (father)
- Boxing record from BoxRec

Gradus Kraus (born 12 July 2001) is a Dutch professional boxer. He is the son of former Kickboxer Albert Kraus. He fights at Light heavyweight is currently ranked #26 by BoxRec and #12 by the IBF. He is trained by Peter Fury and his father Albert.

== Amateur career ==
In 2018, Gradus Kraus won his first gold in the Dutch Youth National Championships against Irishman David McDonagh.

In 2019, he participated in the EUBC European Youth Championships but got defeated in the Quarter Final by Nikolay Zafirov.

In 2021, Gradus became Dutch 81 kg Amateur champion after knocking out Rick de Nooijer in the first round. He broke his hand during the fight.

In 2022, he won a silver medal at the EUBC U22 Championships after losing to Alfred Commey in the final.

In an interview in 2023, Gradus declared that he wanted to participate in the Olympics, and after this become a professional boxer. In 2024, he attempted to qualify for the Olympics but failed to do so twice. After this, he decided to become a professional boxer.

== Professional boxing career ==
Kraus made his professional boxing debut in 2024, quickly racking up 8 wins within 1 year, which is unusual in modern boxing. During this period Gradus went viral for dancing with his 3-year-old daughter during his ring walks. His wins and fame earned him a fight for the European IBF title against Rostam Ibrahim. In the build up to the fight Kraus' promoter Izzy Asif said that this might be the last time people get to see him fight in the Netherlands for a while, claiming people might see him fight for a world title in 2026. As a result, the fight was highly anticipated and sold out within 3 days. Gradus Kraus defeated Ibrahim by KO in the second round, claiming the European title.

He fought Boris Crighton in January 2026 and beat him in the second round after the referee stopped the fight. In May, he defeated Theo Brooks by TKO, also in the second round, moving Kraus up to #12 in the IBF rankings.

== Professional boxing record ==
12 fights	12 wins	0 losses
By knockout	11	0
By decision	1	0

No.	Result	Record	Opponent	Type	Round, time	Date	Age	Location	Notes
12	Win	12–0	Sean Hemphill	TKO	1 (10), 1:03	August 8, 2026	25 years, 27 days	Leeds Arena, Leeds, United Kingdom	
11	Win	11–0	Theo Brooks	TKO	2 (8),	May 9, 2026	24 years, 301 days	Topsportcentrum, Rotterdam, Netherlands	
10	Win	10–0	Boris Crighton	TKO	2 (8), 1:59	January 31, 2026	24 years, 203 days	Copper Box Arena, London, United Kingdom	
9	Win	9–0	Rostam Ibrahim	KO	2 (10),	Nov 29, 2025	24 years, 140 days	Sportcomplex De Wilgenring, Rotterdam, Netherlands	Won IBF European Light Heavy title
8	Win	8–0	Scott Forrest	PTS	6 (6),	Sep 27, 2025	24 years, 77 days	Park Community Arena, Sheffield, United Kingdom	
7	Win	7–0	Ross McGuigan	TKO	2 (6), 0:54	Jun 28, 2025	23 years, 351 days	Connexin Live, Hull, United Kingdom	
6	Win	6–0	Attila Baran	KO	1 (8)	Jun 14, 2025	23 years, 337 days	Sportworx Arena, Utrecht, Netherlands	
5	Win	5–0	Tony Amoaku	TKO	1 (6), 2:05	Apr 04, 2025	23 years, 266 days	York Hall, London, United Kingdom	
4	Win	4–0	Josip Pehar	TKO	2 (6), 2:26	Mar 8, 2025	23 years, 239 days	Magna Centr, Rotherham, United Kingdom	
3	Win	3–0	Oladimeji Akinde	TKO	1 (6)	Jan 18, 2025	23 years, 193 days	Circus Theater, Scheveningen, Netherlands	
2	Win	2–0	Michal Kotula	TKO	2 (6)	Dec 22, 2024	23 years, 163 days	Dudok Arena, Hilversum, Netherlands	
1	Win	1–0	Jedrzej Durski	KO	1 (4)	Oct 21, 2024	23 years, 101 days	Theater Carré, Amsterdam, Netherlands	
