= Lewis Williams (boxer) =

English boxer (born 1998)

Personal information
- Nationality: England
- Born: 24 December 1998 (age 27) Leamington Spa, Warwickshire

Boxing career
Medal record
Men's amateur boxing
Representing England
European Championships
Bronze medal – third place	2022 Yerevan	Heavyweight
Commonwealth Games
Gold medal – first place	2022 Birmingham	Men's heavyweight

Lewis Williams (born 24 December 1998) is an English boxer. He competed at the 2022 European Amateur Boxing Championships, winning the bronze medal in the heavyweight event. He previously competed at the 2021 AIBA World Boxing Championships in the heavyweight event, but was defeated in the quarter-final by Madiyar Saydrakhimov.

Williams competed at the 2022 Commonwealth Games, winning the gold medal in the heavyweight division. He defeated Ato Plodzicki-Faoagali 5-0 in the final.
