= Erivan Barut =

Kurdish kickboxer (born 2000)

- Born: 26 June 2000 (age 26); Dersim, Turkey
- Nationality: Kurdish
- Height: 1.63 m (5 ft 4 in)
- Weight: 50 kg (110 lb; 7 st 12 lb)
- Style: Boxing, Kickboxing, Muay Thai
- Stance: Orthodox
- Fighting out of: Dersim, Turkey
- Team: Dersim Kickbox
- Trainer: Gürsel Tayam

Kickboxing record
- Total: 5
- Wins: 5
- By knockout: 2
- Losses: 0
- By knockout: 1

Erivan Barut (born June 26, 2000) is a Turkish professional muay thai kickboxer and amateur boxer. As of November 2023, she is the #6 ranked women's strawweight kickboxer in the world according to Beyond Kickboxing.

== Professional kickboxing career ==
Barut faced Sarai Medina at Nak 8 Muay at Nak 8 Muay on January 30, 2022. She won the fight by unanimous decision.

Barut made her K-1 debut against Miho Takanashi at K-1: Ring of Venus on June 25, 2022. She handed Takanashi her first professional loss, as she won the fight by unanimous decision.

Barut faced Ines Correira for the vacant WAKO-Pro World Low Kick Flyweight (-50 kg) title at UFA 5 on April 29, 2023. She won the fight by unanimous decision.

Barut faced the K-1 Women's Flyweight champion SAHO in a non-title bout at K-1 World GP 2024 in Osaka on October 5, 2024. She lost the fight by unanimous decision.

== Championships and accomplishments ==
=== Professional ===
- World Association of Kickboxing Organizations
  - 2023 WAKO-Pro World Low Kick Flyweight (-50 kg) Championship

=== Amateur ===
- Türkiye Kick Boks Federasyonu
  - (bronze) 2019 Turkish Kickboxing Championship Low Kick (-48 kg)
  - (gold) 2022 Turkish Kickboxing Championship Low Kick (-48 kg)
- World Association of Kickboxing Organizations
  - (silver) 2019 Turkish Open WAKO World Cup Full Contact (-48 kg)
  - (silver) 2019 Turkish Open WAKO World Cup Low Kick (-48 kg)
  - (silver) 2021 Turkish Open WAKO World Cup Low Kick (-48 kg)
  - (gold) 2022 Turkish Open WAKO World Cup Low Kick (-48 kg)
  - (gold) 2023 Turkish Open WAKO World Cup Low Kick (-48 kg)
  - (gold) 2023 Hungarian Kickboxing World Cup Low Kick (-48 kg)
  - (gold) 2023 WAKO World Championship Low Kick (-48 kg)
- International Federation of Muaythai Associations
  - (gold) 2022 IFMA European Championships (-48 kg)
  - (gold) 2022 IFMA Antalya Open (-51 kg)

== Fight record ==
Professional Kickboxing Record
5 Wins (2 (T)KOs), 1 Loss, 0 Draws
| Date | Result | Opponent | Event | Location | Method | Round | Time |
| 2024-10-05 | Loss | (Japan) SAHO | K-1 World GP 2024 in Osaka | Osaka, Japan | Decision (Unanimous) | 3 | 3:00 |
| 2024-07-12 | Win | (Iran) Reyhane Saeedi | Loca Fight Club | Istanbul, Turkey | KO | 2 | |
| 2023-04-29 | Win | (Portugal) Ines Correira | UFA 5 | İzmir, Turkey | Decision (Unanimous) | 5 | 3:00 |
Wins the vacant WAKO-Pro World Low Kick Flyweight (-50 kg) title.
| 2022-06-25 | Win | (Japan) Miho Takanashi | K-1: Ring of Venus | Tokyo, Japan | Decision (Unanimous) | 3 | 3:00 |
| 2022-01-30 | Win | (Spain) Sarai Medina | Nak 8 Muay | Barcelona, Spain | Decision (Unanimous) | 5 | 3:00 |
| 2021-09-22 | Win | (Turkey) Selen Ahlat | Army of Fighters 2 | Istanbul, Turkey | KO (Head kick) | 1 | 1:16 |
Legend: Win Loss Draw/No contest Notes

Amateur Kickboxing Record
| Date | Result | Opponent | Event | Location | Method | Round | Time |
|---|---|---|---|---|---|---|---|
| 2023-11-25 | Win | (Israel) Monia Heno | 2023 WAKO World Championship, Tournament Final | Albufeira, Portugal | Decision (Unanimous) | 3 | 2:00 |
Wins the 2023 WAKO World Championship Low Kick -48kg Gold Medal.
| 2023-11- | Win | (Croatia) Snježana Prgomet | 2023 WAKO World Championship, Tournament Semifinal | Albufeira, Portugal | Decision (Unanimous) | 3 | 2:00 |
| 2023-11- | Win | (Poland) Kamila Golebiewska | 2023 WAKO World Championship, Tournament Quarterfinal | Albufeira, Portugal | Decision (Unanimous) | 3 | 2:00 |
| 2023-06-18 | Win | (Poland) Kamila Golebiewska | 28th Hungarian Kickboxing World Cup, Tournament Final | Budapest, Hungary | Decision (Unanimous) | 3 | 2:00 |
Wins the 2023 Hungarian Kickboxing World Cup Low Kick -48kg Gold Medal.
| 2023-06-16 | Win | (Kazakhstan) Gulmira Tolepbergen | 28th Hungarian Kickboxing World Cup, Tournament Semifinal | Budapest, Hungary | Decision (Unanimous) | 3 | 2:00 |
| 2023-05-21 | Win | (Turkey) Gamze Korkmaz | 8th Turkish Open WAKO World Cup, Tournament Final | Istanbul, Turkey | Decision (Unanimous) | 3 | 2:00 |
Wins the 2023 Turkish Open WAKO World Cup Low Kick -48kg Gold Medal.
| 2023-05-19 | Win | (Turkey) Melis Mandiraci | 8th Turkish Open WAKO World Cup, Tournament Semifinal | Istanbul, Turkey | Decision (Unanimous) | 3 | 2:00 |
| 2022-11-27 | Win | (Morocco) Meriem El Moubarik | 2022 IFMA Antalya Open, Tournament Final | Antalya, Turkey | Decision (Unanimous) | 3 | 2:00 |
Wins the 2022 IFMA Antalya Open -51 kg Gold Medal.
| 2022-11-25 | Win | (Iran) Fasihehsadat Radmanesh | 2022 IFMA Antalya Open, Tournament Semifinal | Antalya, Turkey | Decision (Unanimous) | 3 | 2:00 |
| 2022-05-15 | Win | (Turkey) Busra Tastemir | 7th Turkish Open WAKO World Cup, Tournament Final | Istanbul, Turkey | Decision (Unanimous) | 3 | 2:00 |
Wins the 2022 Turkish Open WAKO World Cup Low Kick -48kg Gold Medal.
| 2022-05-13 | Win | (Israel) Monia Heno | 7th Turkish Open WAKO World Cup, Tournament Semifinal | Istanbul, Turkey | Decision (Unanimous) | 3 | 2:00 |
| 2022-02-20 | Win | (Ukraine) Anastasiia Mykhailenko | 2022 IFMA European Championships, Tournament Final | Istanbul, Turkey | Decision (Unanimous) | 3 | 2:00 |
Wins the 2022 IFMA European Championships -48 kg Gold Medal.
| 2022-02-18 | Win | (Russia) Vera Buga | 2022 IFMA European Championships, Tournament Semifinal | Istanbul, Turkey | Decision (Unanimous) | 3 | 2:00 |
| 2021-04-11 | Loss | (Turkey) Zeynep Çeti̇ntaş | 6th Turkish Open WAKO World Cup, Tournament Final | Antalya, Turkey | Decision (Split) | 3 | 2:00 |
Wins the 2021 Turkish Open WAKO World Cup Low Kick -48kg Silver Medal.
| 2021-04-09 | Win | (Turkey) Sevi̇lay Taş | 6th Turkish Open WAKO World Cup, Tournament Semifinal | Antalya, Turkey | Decision (Split) | 3 | 2:00 |
| 2020-02-05 | Loss | (Turkey) Gulistan Turan | 2020 Turkish U23 Championships, Tournament Quarterfinal | Istanbul, Turkey | Decision (Unanimous) | 3 | 2:00 |
| 2019-04-07 | Loss | (Turkey) Hayriye Türksoy | 4th Turkish Open WAKO World Cup, Tournament Final | Antalya, Turkey | Decision (Split) | 3 | 2:00 |
Wins the 2019 Turkish Open WAKO World Cup Low Kick -48kg Silver Medal.
| 2019-04-05 | Win | (Turkey) Büşra Taştemi̇r | 4th Turkish Open WAKO World Cup, Tournament Semifinal | Antalya, Turkey | Decision (Unanimous) | 3 | 2:00 |
| 2019-04-04 | Win | (Turkey) Gülşah Çakir | 4th Turkish Open WAKO World Cup, Tournament Quarterfinal | Antalya, Turkey | Decision (Split) | 3 | 2:00 |
| 2019-04-07 | Loss | (Turkey) Büşra Taştemi̇r | 4th Turkish Open WAKO World Cup, Tournament Final | Antalya, Turkey | Decision (Unanimous) | 3 | 2:00 |
Wins the 2019 Turkish Open WAKO World Cup Full Contact -48kg Silver Medal.
| 2019-04-05 | Win | (Turkey) Remziye Yenikan | 4th Turkish Open WAKO World Cup, Tournament Semifinal | Antalya, Turkey | Decision (Unanimous) | 3 | 2:00 |
| 2019-04-04 | Win | (Turkey) Buse Kezban Genç | 4th Turkish Open WAKO World Cup, Tournament Quarterfinal | Antalya, Turkey | Decision (Unanimous) | 3 | 2:00 |
| 2018-04-05 | Loss | (Turkey) Sevcan Çakirca | 3rd Turkish Open WAKO World Cup, Tournament Quarterfinal | Antalya, Turkey | Decision (Unanimous) | 3 | 2:00 |
Legend: Win Loss Draw/No contest Notes

== See also ==
- List of female kickboxers
