= Lazizbek Mullojonov =

Uzbekistani boxer (born 1999)

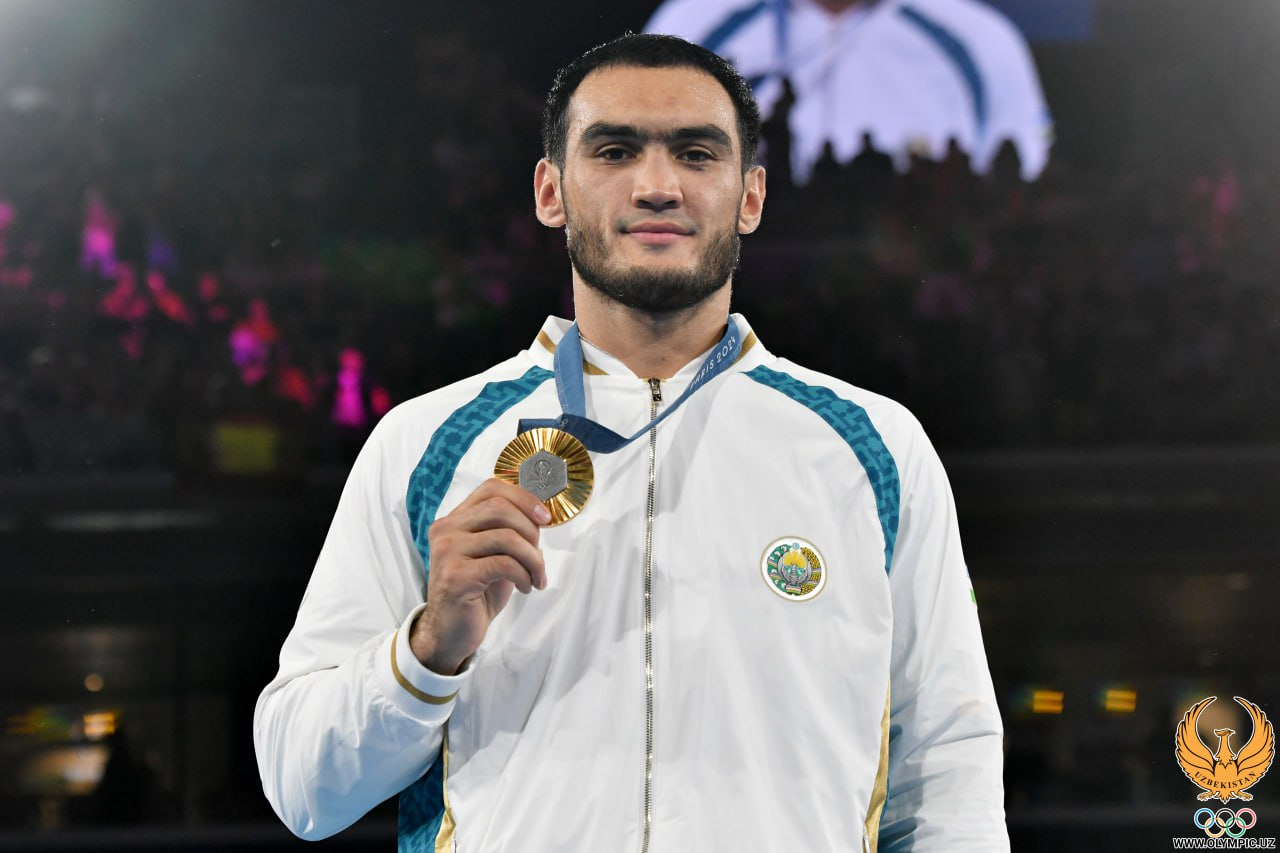
- Mullojonov at the 2024 Summer Olympics

Personal information
- Born: 13 May 1999 (age 27) Fergana, Uzbekistan
- Height: 192 cm (6 ft 4 in)
- Weight: Super-heavyweight

Boxing career
- Stance: Southpaw

Boxing record
- Total fights: 8
- Wins: 7
- Win by KO: 7
- No contests: 1
Medal record
Men's boxing
Representing Uzbekistan
Olympic Games
Gold medal – first place	2024 Paris	Heavyweight
World Championships
Bronze medal – third place	2023 Tashkent	Heavyweight
Asian Championships
Gold medal – first place	2022 Amman	Super heavyweight
World Military Boxing Championships
Gold medal – first place	2021 Moscow	Super heavyweight

Lazizbek Mullojonov (born 13 May 1999) is an Uzbek professional boxer. He won a gold medal at the 2022 Asian Championships as a super-heavyweight. He became Olympic Champion in the heavyweight event at the 2024 Summer Olympics.

Mullojonov is currently serving a three-year ban set to expire to July 2028 for an anti-doping rule violation.

== Professional career ==
=== 2021 ===
On 29 January 2021, in Moscow (Russia) Mullojonov made his debut in the professional ring, ahead of schedule by technical knockout in the 2nd round, defeating Russian Alexander Stepanov (2–2).

At the end of September 2021, he became the world champion at the 58th Military World Boxing Championship in Moscow (Russia) held under the auspices of the International Military Sports Council, in the final, by a split decision of the judges, defeating an experienced Russian Svyatoslav Teterin.

At the end of October – at the beginning of November 2021 in Belgradee (Serbia), participated in the 2021 AIBA World Boxing Championships in the category over 92 kg. Where in 1/16 finals defeated the experienced Iranian Puria Amiri on points, in the 1/8 finals he defeated the Brit Delicious Ori, but in the quarterfinal on points in a competitive battle he lost to the Armenian David Chaloyan – who became the silver medalist of this world championship.

=== 2022 ===
In February 2022, he became the champion in the weight category over 92 kg of the prestigious international Strandzha Cup held in Sofia (Bulgaria), where he defeated the experienced Russian Yaroslav Doronichev, then in the semi-finals by points of victories Kazakh silt Nurlan Saparbay, and in the final he defeated the experienced German boxer Nelvy Tiafaka.

=== 2025 Provisional Suspension ===
In November 2025, Mullojonov was issued with a three-year ban backdated to July 2025 by the International Testing Agency for an anti-doping rule violation after testing positive for methasterone.

== Professional boxing record ==
8 fights	7 wins	0 losses
By knockout	7	0
No contests	1	

No.	Result	Record	Opponent	Type	Round, time	Date	Location	Notes
8	Win	7–0 (1)	Monyasahu Muritador	TKO	3 (10), 0:38	14 Nov 2025	Humo Arena, Tashkent, Uzbekistan	Won vacant WBC CISBB heavyweight title
7	NC	6–0 (1)	Youness Baalla	NC	6	21 Jun 2025	Global Theater Boulevard Riyadh City, Riyadh	WBC Grand Prix Heavyweight Round of 16; Originally UD win for Mullojonov, changed to NC after Mullojonov failed drug test
6	Win	6–0	Marvin Mendoza	TKO	3 (6), 1:59	20 April 2025	Global Theater Boulevard Riyadh City, Riyadh, Saudi Arabia	WBC Grand Prix Heavyweight Round of 32
5	Win	5–0	Ruslan Miraimov	TKO	2 (8), 2:12	29 Jan 2025	Sport Palace Yunusabad, Tashkent, Uzbekistan	
4	Win	4–0	Nursultan Amanzholov	TKO	1 (8), 2:13	26 Aug 2023	Stadion Wrocław, Wrocław, Poland	
3	Win	3–0	Michael Bassett	TKO	1 (6), 1:04	13 Aug 2021	Humo Arena, Tashkent, Uzbekistan	
2	Win	2–0	Anton Sjomkin	KO	1(6), 0:31	4 Jun 2021	Sibur Arena, Saint Petersburg, Russia	
1	Win	1–0	Alexander Stepanov	TKO	1 (6), 1:05	29 Jan 2021	USC Soviet Wings, Moscow, Russia	
