= Davlat Boltaev =

Tajik boxer (born 1999)

Davlat Rustamovich Boltaev
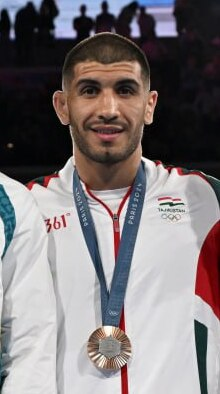
- Boltaev at the 2024 Summer Olympics

Personal information
- Born: 13 January 1999 (age 27) Dushanbe, Tajikistan

Boxing career
Medal record
Men's Amateur Boxing
Representing Tajikistan
Olympic Games
Bronze medal – third place	2024 Paris	Heavyweight
Asian Games
Gold medal – first place	2022 Hangzhou	Heavyweight

Davlat Rustamovich Boltaev (Tajik: Давлат Рустамович Болтаев, born 13 January 1999) is a Tajikistani boxer who won a gold medal at the 2022 Asian Games in Hangzhou, China. Boltaev qualified for the 2024 Summer Olympics, where he won bronze, losing to the eventual heavyweight champion, Lazizbek Mullojonov.

== Career ==
In 2022, Boltaev came in 5th at the Asian Championships in Amman, Jordan. In 2023, he came in 5th at the World Championships in Tashkent, Uzbekistan.
