= Radoslav Pantaleev =

Bulgarian boxer

Personal information
- Nationality: Bulgarian
- Born: 5 July 1993 (age 33) Pleven, Bulgaria
- Height: 1.83 m (6 ft 0 in)

Boxing career
- Stance: Orthodox

Boxing record
- Total fights: 28
- Wins: 16
- Win by KO: 1
- Losses: 12
- Draws: 0
- No contests: 0
Medal record
Men's amateur boxing
Representing Bulgaria
World Championships
Bronze medal – third place	2019 Yekaterinburg	Heavyweight

Radoslav Dimitrov Pantaleev (born 5 July 1993) is a Bulgarian boxer.

He won a medal at the 2019 AIBA World Boxing Championships.
