= Aziz Abbes Mouhiidine =

Italian boxer (born 1998)

Personal information
- Nationality: Italian
- Born: 6 October 1998 (age 27) Solofra, Italy
- Height: 6 ft 3 in (191 cm)
- Weight: Heavyweight

Boxing career
- Stance: Southpaw
Medal record
Men's amateur boxing
Representing Italy
IBA World Championships
Silver medal – second place	2021 Belgrade	Heavyweight
Silver medal – second place	2023 Tashkent	Heavyweight
European Games
Gold medal – first place	2023 Kraków-Małopolska	Heavyweight
European Championships
Gold medal – first place	2022 Yerevan	Heavyweight
European Union Championships
Gold medal – first place	2018 Valladolid	Heavyweight
Mediterranean Games
Gold medal – first place	2018 Tarragona	Heavyweight
Gold medal – first place	2022 Oran	Heavyweight

Aziz Abbes Mouhiidine (born 6 October 1998) is an Italian boxer. He competed at the 2021 AIBA World Boxing Championships, winning the silver medal in the heavyweight event, and at the 2022 European Amateur Boxing Championships, winning the gold medal in the heavyweight event.
