= List of medalists at the IBA World Boxing Championships =

This is a list of medalists at the IBA World Boxing Championships.

== Minimumweight ==
- −48 kg: 2021–

Games	Gold	Silver	Bronze
2021 Belgrade	Temirtas Zhussupov (KAZ)	Wuttichai Yurachai (TBF)	Yauheni Karmilchyk (BLR)
2021 Belgrade	Temirtas Zhussupov (KAZ)	Wuttichai Yurachai (TBF)	Sakhil Alakhverdovi (GEO)
2023 Tashkent	Sanzhar Tashkenbay (KAZ)	Sakhil Alakhverdovi (GEO)	Alejandro Claro (CUB)
2023 Tashkent	Sanzhar Tashkenbay (KAZ)	Sakhil Alakhverdovi (GEO)	Edmond Khudoyan (RUS)
2025 Dubai	Subhan Mamedov (AZE)	Edmond Khudoyan (RUS)	Temirtas Zhussupov (KAZ)
2025 Dubai	Subhan Mamedov (AZE)	Edmond Khudoyan (RUS)	Sakhil Alakhverdovi (GEO)

== Light flyweight ==
- −48 kg: 1974–2009
- −49 kg: 2011–2017

Games	Gold	Silver	Bronze
1974 Havana	Jorge Hernández (CUB)	Stephen Muchoki (KEN)	Enrique Rodríguez (ESP)
1974 Havana	Jorge Hernández (CUB)	Stephen Muchoki (KEN)	Yevgeni Yudin (URS)
1978 Belgrade	Stephen Muchoki (KEN)	Jorge Hernández (CUB)	Armando Guevara (VEN)
1978 Belgrade	Stephen Muchoki (KEN)	Jorge Hernández (CUB)	Richie Sandoval (USA)
1982 Munich	Ismail Mustafov (BUL)	Go Yong-hwan (PRK)	Heo Yong-mo (KOR)
1982 Munich	Ismail Mustafov (BUL)	Go Yong-hwan (PRK)	Dietmar Geilich (GDR)
1986 Reno	Juan Torres Odelín (CUB)	Vacant (Note: Luis Román Rolón of Puerto Rico originally won the silver medal, but was disqualified for a doping violation.)	José Rodrigues (BRA)
1986 Reno	Juan Torres Odelín (CUB)	Vacant	Oh Kwang-soo (KOR)
1989 Moscow	Eric Griffin (USA)	Rogelio Marcelo (CUB)	Kim Dok-nam (PRK)
1989 Moscow	Eric Griffin (USA)	Rogelio Marcelo (CUB)	Nshan Munchyan (URS)
1991 Sydney	Eric Griffin (USA)	Rogelio Marcelo (CUB)	Nelson Dieppa (PUR)
1991 Sydney	Eric Griffin (USA)	Rogelio Marcelo (CUB)	Daniel Petrov (BUL)
1993 Tampere	Nshan Munchyan (ARM)	Daniel Petrov (BUL)	Albert Guardado (USA)
1993 Tampere	Nshan Munchyan (ARM)	Daniel Petrov (BUL)	Erdenotsogtyn Tsogtjargal (MGL)
1995 Berlin	Daniel Petrov (BUL)	Bernard Inom (FRA)	Hamid Berhili (MAR)
1995 Berlin	Daniel Petrov (BUL)	Bernard Inom (FRA)	Juan Ramírez (CUB)
1997 Budapest	Maikro Romero (CUB)	Roel Velasco (PHI)	Rudolf Dydi (SVK)
1997 Budapest	Maikro Romero (CUB)	Roel Velasco (PHI)	Daniel Petrov (BUL)
1999 Houston	Brian Viloria (USA)	Maikro Romero (CUB)	Aleksan Nalbandyan (RUS)
1999 Houston	Brian Viloria (USA)	Maikro Romero (CUB)	Suban Pannon (THA)
2001 Belfast	Yan Bartelemí (CUB)	Marian Velicu (ROU)	Ronald Siler (USA)
2001 Belfast	Yan Bartelemí (CUB)	Marian Velicu (ROU)	Harry Tañamor (PHI)
2003 Bangkok	Sergey Kazakov (RUS)	Zou Shiming (CHN)	Nauman Karim (PAK)
2003 Bangkok	Sergey Kazakov (RUS)	Zou Shiming (CHN)	Harry Tañamor (PHI)
2005 Mianyang	Zou Shiming (CHN)	Pál Bedák (HUN)	Sherali Dostiev (TJK)
2005 Mianyang	Zou Shiming (CHN)	Pál Bedák (HUN)	Birzhan Zhakypov (KAZ)
2007 Chicago	Zou Shiming (CHN)	Harry Tañamor (PHI)	Amnat Ruenroeng (THA)
2007 Chicago	Zou Shiming (CHN)	Harry Tañamor (PHI)	Nordine Oubaali (FRA)
2009 Milan	Pürevdorjiin Serdamba (MGL)	David Ayrapetyan (RUS)	Li Jiazhao (CHN)
2009 Milan	Pürevdorjiin Serdamba (MGL)	David Ayrapetyan (RUS)	Shin Jong-hun (KOR)
2011 Baku	Zou Shiming (CHN)	Shin Jong-hun (KOR)	Pürevdorjiin Serdamba (MGL)
2011 Baku	Zou Shiming (CHN)	Shin Jong-hun (KOR)	David Ayrapetyan (RUS)
2013 Almaty	Birzhan Zhakypov (KAZ)	Mohamed Flissi (ALG)	Yosvany Veitía (CUB)
2013 Almaty	Birzhan Zhakypov (KAZ)	Mohamed Flissi (ALG)	David Jimenez (CRC)
2015 Doha	Joahnys Argilagos (CUB)	Vasilii Egorov (RUS)	Rogen Ladon (PHI)
2015 Doha	Joahnys Argilagos (CUB)	Vasilii Egorov (RUS)	Dmytro Zamotayev (UKR)
2017 Hamburg	Joahnys Argilagos (CUB)	Hasanboy Dusmatov (UZB)	Zhomart Yerzhan (KAZ)
2017 Hamburg	Joahnys Argilagos (CUB)	Hasanboy Dusmatov (UZB)	Yuberjen Martínez (COL)

== Flyweight ==
- −51 kg: 1974–2009
- −52 kg: 2011–2019
- −51 kg: 2021–

Games	Gold	Silver	Bronze
1974 Havana	Douglas Rodríguez (CUB)	Alfredo Pérez (VEN)	Vladislav Zasypko (URS)
1974 Havana	Douglas Rodríguez (CUB)	Alfredo Pérez (VEN)	Constantin Gruiescu (ROU)
1978 Belgrade	Henryk Średnicki (POL)	Héctor Ramírez (CUB)	Alexander Mikhailov (URS)
1978 Belgrade	Henryk Średnicki (POL)	Héctor Ramírez (CUB)	Ishi Koki (JPN)
1982 Munich	Yuri Alexandrov (URS)	Michael Collins (USA)	Jesús Pool (VEN)
1982 Munich	Yuri Alexandrov (URS)	Michael Collins (USA)	Constantin Titoiu (ROU)
1986 Reno	Pedro Orlando Reyes (CUB)	David Griman (VEN)	János Váradi (HUN)
1986 Reno	Pedro Orlando Reyes (CUB)	David Griman (VEN)	Eyüp Can (TUR)
1989 Moscow	Yuri Arbachakov (URS)	Pedro Orlando Reyes (CUB)	Li Dwang-sik (PRK)
1989 Moscow	Yuri Arbachakov (URS)	Pedro Orlando Reyes (CUB)	Krzysztof Wróblewski (POL)
1991 Sydney	István Kovács (HUN)	Choe Chol-su (PRK)	Hassan Mustafa (EGY)
1991 Sydney	István Kovács (HUN)	Choe Chol-su (PRK)	Yuliyan Strogov (BUL)
1993 Tampere	Waldemar Font (CUB)	Kikmatulla Ahmedov (UZB)	Hassan Mustafa (EGY)
1993 Tampere	Waldemar Font (CUB)	Kikmatulla Ahmedov (UZB)	Damaen Kelly (IRE)
1995 Berlin	Zoltan Lunka (GER)	Bulat Zhumadilov (KAZ)	Raúl González (CUB)
1995 Berlin	Zoltan Lunka (GER)	Bulat Zhumadilov (KAZ)	Joni Turunen (FIN)
1997 Budapest	Manuel Mantilla (CUB)	Ilfat Razyapov (RUS)	Omar Narváez (ARG)
1997 Budapest	Manuel Mantilla (CUB)	Ilfat Razyapov (RUS)	Bulat Zhumadilov (KAZ)
1999 Houston	Bulat Zhumadilov (KAZ)	Omar Narváez (ARG)	Waldemar Cuceranu (ROU)
1999 Houston	Bulat Zhumadilov (KAZ)	Omar Narváez (ARG)	Andrzej Rżany (POL)
2001 Belfast	Jérôme Thomas (FRA)	Volodymyr Sydorenko (UKR)	Aleksandar Aleksandrov (BUL)
2001 Belfast	Jérôme Thomas (FRA)	Volodymyr Sydorenko (UKR)	Georgy Balakshin (RUS)
2003 Bangkok	Somjit Jongjohor (THA)	Jérôme Thomas (FRA)	Aleksandar Aleksandrov (BUL)
2003 Bangkok	Somjit Jongjohor (THA)	Jérôme Thomas (FRA)	Rustamhodza Rahimov (GER)
2005 Mianyang	Lee Ok-sung (KOR)	Andry Laffita (CUB)	Rau'shee Warren (USA)
2005 Mianyang	Lee Ok-sung (KOR)	Andry Laffita (CUB)	Mirat Sarsembayev (KAZ)
2007 Chicago	Rau'shee Warren (USA)	Somjit Jongjohor (THA)	Vincenzo Picardi (ITA)
2007 Chicago	Rau'shee Warren (USA)	Somjit Jongjohor (THA)	Samir Mammadov (AZE)
2009 Milan	McWilliams Arroyo (PUR)	Tugstsogt Nyambayar (MGL)	Ronny Beblik (GER)
2009 Milan	McWilliams Arroyo (PUR)	Tugstsogt Nyambayar (MGL)	Misha Aloyan (RUS)
2011 Baku	Misha Aloyan (RUS)	Andrew Selby (WAL)	Rau'shee Warren (USA)
2011 Baku	Misha Aloyan (RUS)	Andrew Selby (WAL)	Jasurbek Latipov (UZB)
2013 Almaty	Misha Aloyan (RUS)	Jasurbek Latipov (UZB)	Andrew Selby (WAL)
2013 Almaty	Misha Aloyan (RUS)	Jasurbek Latipov (UZB)	Chatchai Butdee (THA)
2015 Doha	Elvin Mamishzada (AZE)	Yosvany Veitía (CUB)	Hu Jianguan (CHN)
2015 Doha	Elvin Mamishzada (AZE)	Yosvany Veitía (CUB)	Mohamed Flissi (ALG)
2017 Hamburg	Yosvany Veitía (CUB)	Jasurbek Latipov (UZB)	Tamir Galanov (RUS)
2017 Hamburg	Yosvany Veitía (CUB)	Jasurbek Latipov (UZB)	Kim In-kyu (KOR)
2019 Yekaterinburg	Shakhobidin Zoirov (UZB)	Amit Panghal (IND)	Billal Bennama (FRA)
2019 Yekaterinburg	Shakhobidin Zoirov (UZB)	Amit Panghal (IND)	Saken Bibossinov (KAZ)
2021 Belgrade	Saken Bibossinov (KAZ)	Roscoe Hill (USA)	(Russia) Akhtem Zakirov (RBF)
2021 Belgrade	Saken Bibossinov (KAZ)	Roscoe Hill (USA)	Thanarat Saengphet (TBF)
2023 Tashkent	Hasanboy Dusmatov (UZB)	Billal Bennama (FRA)	Deepak Bhoria (IND)
2023 Tashkent	Hasanboy Dusmatov (UZB)	Billal Bennama (FRA)	Martín Molina (ESP)
2025 Dubai	Hasanboy Dusmatov (UZB)	Bair Batlaev (RUS)	Rudolf Garboyan (ARM)
2025 Dubai	Hasanboy Dusmatov (UZB)	Bair Batlaev (RUS)	Patrick Chinyemba (ZAM)

== Bantamweight ==
- −54 kg: 1974–2009
- −56 kg: 2011–2017
- −54 kg: 2021–

Games	Gold	Silver	Bronze
1974 Havana	Wilfredo Gómez (PUR)	Luis Jorge Romero (CUB)	Aldo Cosentino (FRA)
1974 Havana	Wilfredo Gómez (PUR)	Luis Jorge Romero (CUB)	David Torosyan (URS)
1978 Belgrade	Adolfo Horta (CUB)	Fazlija Šaćirović (YUG)	Stefan Förster (GDR)
1978 Belgrade	Adolfo Horta (CUB)	Fazlija Šaćirović (YUG)	Chung Kim Chil (KOR)
1982 Munich	Floyd Favors (USA)	Viktor Miroshnichenko (URS)	Sami Buzoli (YUG)
1982 Munich	Floyd Favors (USA)	Viktor Miroshnichenko (URS)	Klaus-Dieter Kirchstein (GDR)
1986 Reno	Moon Sung-kil (KOR)	René Breitbarth (GDR)	Arnaldo Mesa (CUB)
1986 Reno	Moon Sung-kil (KOR)	René Breitbarth (GDR)	Yuri Alexandrov (URS)
1989 Moscow	Enrique Carrión (CUB)	Serafim Todorov (BUL)	Li Yong-ho (PRK)
1989 Moscow	Enrique Carrión (CUB)	Serafim Todorov (BUL)	Luigi Quitadamo (ITA)
1991 Sydney	Serafim Todorov (BUL)	Enrique Carrión (CUB)	Vladyslav Antonov (URS)
1991 Sydney	Serafim Todorov (BUL)	Enrique Carrión (CUB)	Li Gwang-sik (PRK)
1993 Tampere	Aleksandar Khristov (BUL)	Joel Casamayor (CUB)	Vladislav Antonov (RUS)
1993 Tampere	Aleksandar Khristov (BUL)	Joel Casamayor (CUB)	Ilhan Güler (TUR)
1995 Berlin	Raimkul Malakhbekov (RUS)	Robert Ciba (POL)	Dirk Krüger (GER)
1995 Berlin	Raimkul Malakhbekov (RUS)	Robert Ciba (POL)	Artur Mikaelyan (ARM)
1997 Budapest	Raimkul Malakhbekov (RUS)	Waldemar Font (CUB)	Soner Karagöz (TUR)
1997 Budapest	Raimkul Malakhbekov (RUS)	Waldemar Font (CUB)	Aram Ramazyan (ARM)
1999 Houston	George Olteanu (ROU)	Kamil Djamaloudinov (RUS)	Benoit Gaudet (CAN)
1999 Houston	George Olteanu (ROU)	Kamil Djamaloudinov (RUS)	Sachis Mechchiyev (BLR)
2001 Belfast	Guillermo Rigondeaux (CUB)	Agasi Agaguloglu (TUR)	Serhiy Danylchenko (UKR)
2001 Belfast	Guillermo Rigondeaux (CUB)	Agasi Agaguloglu (TUR)	Elio Rojas (DOM)
2003 Bangkok	Aghasi Mammadov (AZE)	Gennady Kovalev (RUS)	Detelin Dalakliev (BUL)
2003 Bangkok	Aghasi Mammadov (AZE)	Gennady Kovalev (RUS)	Bahodirjon Sultonov (UZB)
2005 Mianyang	Guillermo Rigondeaux (CUB)	Rustamhodza Rahimov (GER)	Ali Hallab (FRA)
2005 Mianyang	Guillermo Rigondeaux (CUB)	Rustamhodza Rahimov (GER)	Gary Russell Jr. (USA)
2007 Chicago	Sergey Vodopyanov (RUS)	Enkhbatyn Badar-Uugan (MGL)	McJoe Arroyo (PUR)
2007 Chicago	Sergey Vodopyanov (RUS)	Enkhbatyn Badar-Uugan (MGL)	Joe Murray (ENG)
2009 Milan	Detelin Dalakliev (BUL)	Eduard Abzalimov (RUS)	Yankiel León (CUB)
2009 Milan	Detelin Dalakliev (BUL)	Eduard Abzalimov (RUS)	John Joe Nevin (IRL)
2011 Baku	Lázaro Álvarez (CUB)	Luke Campbell (ENG)	John Joe Nevin (IRL)
2011 Baku	Lázaro Álvarez (CUB)	Luke Campbell (ENG)	Anvar Yunusov (TJK)
2013 Almaty	Javid Chalabiyev (AZE)	Vladimir Nikitin (RUS)	Mykola Butsenko (UKR)
2013 Almaty	Javid Chalabiyev (AZE)	Vladimir Nikitin (RUS)	Kairat Yeraliyev (KAZ)
2015 Doha	Michael Conlan (IRL)	Murodjon Akhmadaliev (UZB)	Shiva Thapa (IND)
2015 Doha	Michael Conlan (IRL)	Murodjon Akhmadaliev (UZB)	Dzmitry Asanau (BLR)
2017 Hamburg	Kairat Yeraliyev (KAZ)	Duke Ragan (USA)	Peter McGrail (ENG)
2017 Hamburg	Kairat Yeraliyev (KAZ)	Duke Ragan (USA)	Gaurav Bidhuri (IND)
2021 Belgrade	Tomoya Tsuboi (JPN)	Makhmud Sabyrkhan (KAZ)	Akash Kumar (IND)
2021 Belgrade	Tomoya Tsuboi (JPN)	Makhmud Sabyrkhan (KAZ)	Billal Bennama (FRA)
2023 Tashkent	Makhmud Sabyrkhan (KAZ)	Oybek Juraev (UZB)	Yosvany Veitía (CUB)
2023 Tashkent	Makhmud Sabyrkhan (KAZ)	Oybek Juraev (UZB)	Dmitrii Dvali (RUS)
2025 Dubai	Saken Bibossinov (KAZ)	Viacheslav Rogozin (RUS)	Asilbek Jalilov (UZB)
2025 Dubai	Saken Bibossinov (KAZ)	Viacheslav Rogozin (RUS)	Chandra Bahadur Thapa (NEP)

== Featherweight ==
- −57 kg: 1974–2009, 2019–

Games	Gold	Silver	Bronze
1974 Havana	Howard Davis Jr. (USA)	Boris Kuznetsov (URS)	Mariano Álvarez (CUB)
1974 Havana	Howard Davis Jr. (USA)	Boris Kuznetsov (URS)	Rigoberto Garibaldi (PAN)
1978 Belgrade	Ángel Herrera Vera (CUB)	Bratislav Ristić (YUG)	Roman Gotfryd (POL)
1978 Belgrade	Ángel Herrera Vera (CUB)	Bratislav Ristić (YUG)	Antonio Esparragoza (VEN)
1982 Munich	Adolfo Horta (CUB)	Ravsalyn Otgonbayar (MGL)	Richard Nowakowski (GDR)
1982 Munich	Adolfo Horta (CUB)	Ravsalyn Otgonbayar (MGL)	Bernard Gray (USA)
1986 Reno	Kelcie Banks (USA)	Jesus Sollet (CUB)	Andreas Zülow (GDR)
1986 Reno	Kelcie Banks (USA)	Jesus Sollet (CUB)	Tomasz Nowak (POL)
1989 Moscow	Ayrat Khamatov (URS)	Kirkor Kirkorov (BUL)	Arnaldo Mesa (CUB)
1989 Moscow	Ayrat Khamatov (URS)	Kirkor Kirkorov (BUL)	Jamie Nicholson (AUS)
1991 Sydney	Kirkor Kirkorov (BUL)	Park Duk-kyu (KOR)	Hocine Soltani (ALG)
1991 Sydney	Kirkor Kirkorov (BUL)	Park Duk-kyu (KOR)	Arnaldo Mesa (CUB)
1993 Tampere	Serafim Todorov (BUL)	Enrique Carrión (CUB)	Ramaz Paliani (GEO)
1993 Tampere	Serafim Todorov (BUL)	Enrique Carrión (CUB)	Marcelica Tudoriu (ROU)
1995 Berlin	Serafim Todorov (BUL)	Noureddine Madjhoud (ALG)	Vidas Bičiulaitis (LTU)
1995 Berlin	Serafim Todorov (BUL)	Noureddine Madjhoud (ALG)	Falk Huste (GER)
1997 Budapest	István Kovács (HUN)	Falk Huste (GER)	Sayan Sanszat (RUS)
1997 Budapest	István Kovács (HUN)	Falk Huste (GER)	Rusinelson Hardy (CUB)
1999 Houston	Rocky Juarez (USA)	Tulkunbay Turgunov (UZB)	Ramaz Paliani (TUR)
1999 Houston	Rocky Juarez (USA)	Tulkunbay Turgunov (UZB)	Ovidiu Bobîrnat (ROU)
2001 Belfast	Ramaz Paliani (TUR)	Galib Jafarov (KAZ)	Majid Jelili (SWE)
2001 Belfast	Ramaz Paliani (TUR)	Galib Jafarov (KAZ)	Joni Turunen (FIN)
2003 Bangkok	Galib Jafarov (KAZ)	Vitali Tajbert (GER)	Abdusalom Khasanov (TJK)
2003 Bangkok	Galib Jafarov (KAZ)	Vitali Tajbert (GER)	Cho Seok-hwan (KOR)
2005 Mianyang	Aleksei Tishchenko (RUS)	Alexey Shaydulin (BUL)	Yuriorkis Gamboa (CUB)
2005 Mianyang	Aleksei Tishchenko (RUS)	Alexey Shaydulin (BUL)	Viorel Simion (ROU)
2007 Chicago	Albert Selimov (RUS)	Vasyl Lomachenko (UKR)	Yakup Kılıç (TUR)
2007 Chicago	Albert Selimov (RUS)	Vasyl Lomachenko (UKR)	Li Yang (CHN)
2009 Milan	Vasyl Lomachenko (UKR)	Sergey Vodopyanov (RUS)	Óscar Valdez (MEX)
2009 Milan	Vasyl Lomachenko (UKR)	Sergey Vodopyanov (RUS)	Bahodirjon Sultonov (UZB)
2019 Yekaterinburg	Mirazizbek Mirzakhalilov (UZB)	Lázaro Álvarez (CUB)	Peter McGrail (ENG)
2019 Yekaterinburg	Mirazizbek Mirzakhalilov (UZB)	Lázaro Álvarez (CUB)	Erdenebatyn Tsendbaatar (MGL)
2021 Belgrade	Jahmal Harvey (USA)	Serik Temirzhanov (KAZ)	Samuel Kistohurry (FRA)
2021 Belgrade	Jahmal Harvey (USA)	Serik Temirzhanov (KAZ)	Osvel Caballero (CUB)
2023 Tashkent	Abdumalik Khalokov (UZB)	Saidel Horta (CUB)	Mohammad Hussamuddin (IND)
2023 Tashkent	Abdumalik Khalokov (UZB)	Saidel Horta (CUB)	Munarbek Seitbek Uulu (KGZ)
2025 Dubai	Orazbek Assylkulov (KAZ)	Khusravkhon Rakhimov (TJK)	Andrei Peglivanian (RUS)
2025 Dubai	Orazbek Assylkulov (KAZ)	Khusravkhon Rakhimov (TJK)	Khujanazar Nortojiev (UZB)

== Lightweight ==
- −60 kg: 1974–2017, 2021–

Games	Gold	Silver	Bronze
1974 Havana	Vassily Solomin (URS)	Simion Cuțov (ROU)	Luis Echaide (CUB)
1974 Havana	Vassily Solomin (URS)	Simion Cuțov (ROU)	José Luis Vellon (PUR)
1978 Belgrade	Davidson Andeh (NGR)	Vladimir Sorokin (URS)	René Weller (FRG)
1978 Belgrade	Davidson Andeh (NGR)	Vladimir Sorokin (URS)	Lutz Käsebier (GDR)
1982 Munich	Ángel Herrera Vera (CUB)	Pernell Whitaker (USA)	Viorel Ioana (ROU)
1982 Munich	Ángel Herrera Vera (CUB)	Pernell Whitaker (USA)	Milivoj Labudović (YUG)
1986 Reno	Adolfo Horta (CUB)	Engels Pedroza (VEN)	Orzubek Nazarov (URS)
1986 Reno	Adolfo Horta (CUB)	Engels Pedroza (VEN)	Emil Chuprenski (BUL)
1989 Moscow	Julio González (CUB)	Andreas Zülow (GDR)	Tonga McClain (USA)
1989 Moscow	Julio González (CUB)	Andreas Zülow (GDR)	Kostya Tszyu (URS)
1991 Sydney	Marco Rudolph (GER)	Artur Grigorian (URS)	Justin Rowsell (AUS)
1991 Sydney	Marco Rudolph (GER)	Artur Grigorian (URS)	Vasile Nistor (ROU)
1993 Tampere	Damian Austin (CUB)	Larry Nicholson (USA)	Tibor Rafael (SVK)
1993 Tampere	Damian Austin (CUB)	Larry Nicholson (USA)	Vasile Nistor (ROU)
1995 Berlin	Leonard Doroftei (ROU)	Bruno Wartelle (FRA)	Marco Rudolph (GER)
1995 Berlin	Leonard Doroftei (ROU)	Bruno Wartelle (FRA)	Pablo Rojas (CUB)
1997 Budapest	Alexander Maletin (RUS)	Tümentsetsegiin Üitümen (MGL)	Koba Gogoladze (GEO)
1997 Budapest	Alexander Maletin (RUS)	Tümentsetsegiin Üitümen (MGL)	Shin Eun-chul (KOR)
1999 Houston	Mario Kindelán (CUB)	Aleksey Steponov (RUS)	Gheorghe Lungu (ROU)
1999 Houston	Mario Kindelán (CUB)	Aleksey Steponov (RUS)	Dimitar Shtilianov (BUL)
2001 Belfast	Mario Kindelán (CUB)	Vladimir Kolesnik (UKR)	Alexander Maletin (RUS)
2001 Belfast	Mario Kindelán (CUB)	Vladimir Kolesnik (UKR)	Filip Palić (CRO)
2003 Bangkok	Mario Kindelán (CUB)	Pichai Sayotha (THA)	Martin Dressen (GER)
2003 Bangkok	Mario Kindelán (CUB)	Pichai Sayotha (THA)	Gyula Káté (HUN)
2005 Mianyang	Yordenis Ugás (CUB)	Ramal Amanov (AZE)	Khabib Allakhverdiev (RUS)
2005 Mianyang	Yordenis Ugás (CUB)	Ramal Amanov (AZE)	Domenico Valentino (ITA)
2007 Chicago	Frankie Gavin (ENG)	Domenico Valentino (ITA)	Aleksei Tishchenko (RUS)
2007 Chicago	Frankie Gavin (ENG)	Domenico Valentino (ITA)	Kim Song-guk (PRK)
2009 Milan	Domenico Valentino (ITA)	Jose Pedraza (PUR)	Koba Pkhakadze (GEO)
2009 Milan	Domenico Valentino (ITA)	Jose Pedraza (PUR)	Albert Selimov (RUS)
2011 Baku	Vasyl Lomachenko (UKR)	Yasniel Toledo (CUB)	Domenico Valentino (ITA)
2011 Baku	Vasyl Lomachenko (UKR)	Yasniel Toledo (CUB)	Gani Zhailauov (KAZ)
2013 Almaty	Lázaro Álvarez (CUB)	Robson Conceição (BRA)	Domenico Valentino (ITA)
2013 Almaty	Lázaro Álvarez (CUB)	Robson Conceição (BRA)	Berik Abdrakhmanov (KAZ)
2015 Doha	Lázaro Álvarez (CUB)	Albert Selimov (AZE)	Elnur Abduraimov (UZB)
2015 Doha	Lázaro Álvarez (CUB)	Albert Selimov (AZE)	Robson Conceição (BRA)
2017 Hamburg	Sofiane Oumiha (FRA)	Lázaro Álvarez (CUB)	Otar Eranosyan (GEO)
2017 Hamburg	Sofiane Oumiha (FRA)	Lázaro Álvarez (CUB)	Dorjnyambuugiin Otgondalai (MGL)
2021 Belgrade	Sofiane Oumiha (FRA)	Abdumalik Khalokov (UZB)	Danial Shahbakhsh (IRI)
2021 Belgrade	Sofiane Oumiha (FRA)	Abdumalik Khalokov (UZB)	Alexy de la Cruz (DOM)
2023 Tashkent	Sofiane Oumiha (FRA)	Erislandy Álvarez (CUB)	Mohammad Abu Jajeh (JOR)
2023 Tashkent	Sofiane Oumiha (FRA)	Erislandy Álvarez (CUB)	Vsevolod Shumkov (RUS)
2025 Dubai	Vsevolod Shumkov (RUS)	Abdumalik Khalokov (UZB)	Artur Bazeyan (ARM)
2025 Dubai	Vsevolod Shumkov (RUS)	Abdumalik Khalokov (UZB)	Akmal Ubaidov (TJK)

== Light welterweight ==
- −63.5 kg: 1974–2001
- −64 kg: 2003–2017
- −63 kg: 2019
- −63.5 kg: 2021–

Games	Gold	Silver	Bronze
1974 Havana	Ayub Kalule (UGA)	Vladimir Kolev (BUL)	Ulrich Beyer (GDR)
1974 Havana	Ayub Kalule (UGA)	Vladimir Kolev (BUL)	Amon Kotey (GHA)
1978 Belgrade	Valery Lvov (URS)	Mehmet Bogujevci (YUG)	Jean-Claude Ruiz (FRA)
1978 Belgrade	Valery Lvov (URS)	Mehmet Bogujevci (YUG)	Karl-Heinz Krüger (GDR)
1982 Munich	Carlos García (CUB)	Kim Dong-kil (KOR)	Mirko Puzović (YUG)
1982 Munich	Carlos García (CUB)	Kim Dong-kil (KOR)	Shadrach Odhiambo (SWE)
1986 Reno	Vassili Shyshov (URS)	Howard Grant (CAN)	Mirko Puzović (YUG)
1986 Reno	Vassili Shyshov (URS)	Howard Grant (CAN)	Borislav Abadzhiev (BUL)
1989 Moscow	Igor Ruzhnikov (URS)	Andreas Otto (GDR)	Vukašin Dobrašinović (YUG)
1989 Moscow	Igor Ruzhnikov (URS)	Andreas Otto (GDR)	Michael Carruth (IRE)
1991 Sydney	Kostya Tszyu (URS)	Vernon Forrest (USA)	Moses James (NGR)
1991 Sydney	Kostya Tszyu (URS)	Vernon Forrest (USA)	Candelario Duvergel (CUB)
1993 Tampere	Héctor Vinent (CUB)	Jyri Kjäll (FIN)	Oleg Saitov (RUS)
1993 Tampere	Héctor Vinent (CUB)	Jyri Kjäll (FIN)	Oktay Urkal (GER)
1995 Berlin	Héctor Vinent (CUB)	Nurhan Süleymanoğlu (TUR)	Radoslav Suslekov (BUL)
1995 Berlin	Héctor Vinent (CUB)	Nurhan Süleymanoğlu (TUR)	Oktay Urkal (GER)
1997 Budapest	Dorel Simion (ROU)	Paata Gvasalia (RUS)	Tonton Semakala (SWE)
1997 Budapest	Dorel Simion (ROU)	Paata Gvasalia (RUS)	Lukáš Konečný (CZE)
1999 Houston	Muhammad Abdullaev (UZB)	Willy Blain (FRA)	Ali Ahraoui (GER)
1999 Houston	Muhammad Abdullaev (UZB)	Willy Blain (FRA)	Lukáš Konečný (CZE)
2001 Belfast	Diógenes Luna (CUB)	Dimitar Shtilianov (BUL)	Willy Blain (FRA)
2001 Belfast	Diógenes Luna (CUB)	Dimitar Shtilianov (BUL)	Yuriy Solotov (UKR)
2003 Bangkok	Willy Blain (FRA)	Alexander Maletin (RUS)	Manus Boonjumnong (THA)
2003 Bangkok	Willy Blain (FRA)	Alexander Maletin (RUS)	Tofik Ahmadov (AZE)
2005 Mianyang	Serik Sapiyev (KAZ)	Dilshod Mahmudov (UZB)	Inocente Fiss (CUB)
2005 Mianyang	Serik Sapiyev (KAZ)	Dilshod Mahmudov (UZB)	Emil Maharramov (AZE)
2007 Chicago	Serik Sapiyev (KAZ)	Gennady Kovalev (RUS)	Masatsugu Kawachi (JPN)
2007 Chicago	Serik Sapiyev (KAZ)	Gennady Kovalev (RUS)	Bradley Saunders (ENG)
2009 Milan	Roniel Iglesias (CUB)	Frankie Gómez (USA)	Uranchimegiin Mönkh-Erdene (MGL)
2009 Milan	Roniel Iglesias (CUB)	Frankie Gómez (USA)	Gyula Káté (HUN)
2011 Baku	Éverton Lopes (BRA)	Denys Berinchyk (UKR)	Tom Stalker (ENG)
2011 Baku	Éverton Lopes (BRA)	Denys Berinchyk (UKR)	Vincenzo Mangiacapre (ITA)
2013 Almaty	Merey Akshalov (KAZ)	Yasniel Toledo (CUB)	Éverton Lopes (BRA)
2013 Almaty	Merey Akshalov (KAZ)	Yasniel Toledo (CUB)	Uranchimegiin Mönkh-Erdene (MGL)
2015 Doha	Vitaly Dunaytsev (RUS)	Fazliddin Gaibnazarov (UZB)	Yasniel Toledo (CUB)
2015 Doha	Vitaly Dunaytsev (RUS)	Fazliddin Gaibnazarov (UZB)	Wuttichai Masuk (THA)
2017 Hamburg	Andy Cruz (CUB)	Ikboljon Kholdarov (UZB)	Freudis Rojas (USA)
2017 Hamburg	Andy Cruz (CUB)	Ikboljon Kholdarov (UZB)	Hovhannes Bachkov (ARM)
2019 Yekaterinburg	Andy Cruz (CUB)	Keyshawn Davis (USA)	Manish Kaushik (IND)
2019 Yekaterinburg	Andy Cruz (CUB)	Keyshawn Davis (USA)	Hovhannes Bachkov (ARM)
2021 Belgrade	Andy Cruz (CUB)	Kerem Özmen (TUR)	Reese Lynch (SCO)
2021 Belgrade	Andy Cruz (CUB)	Kerem Özmen (TUR)	Hovhannes Bachkov (ARM)
2023 Tashkent	Ruslan Abdullaev (UZB)	Baatarsükhiin Chinzorig (MGL)	Hovhannes Bachkov (ARM)
2023 Tashkent	Ruslan Abdullaev (UZB)	Baatarsükhiin Chinzorig (MGL)	Bakhodur Usmonov (TJK)
2025 Dubai	Ilya Popov (RUS)	Omar Livaza (KGZ)	Emmanuel Katema (ZAM)
2025 Dubai	Ilya Popov (RUS)	Omar Livaza (KGZ)	Yertugan Zeinulinov (KAZ)

== Welterweight ==
- −67 kg: 1974–2001
- −69 kg: 2003–2019
- −67 kg: 2021–

Games	Gold	Silver	Bronze
1974 Havana	Emilio Correa (CUB)	Clinton Jackson (USA)	Plamen Yankov (BUL)
1974 Havana	Emilio Correa (CUB)	Clinton Jackson (USA)	Zbigniew Kicka (POL)
1978 Belgrade	Valery Rachkov (URS)	Miodrag Perunović (YUG)	Roosevelt Green (USA)
1978 Belgrade	Valery Rachkov (URS)	Miodrag Perunović (YUG)	Ernst Müller (FRG)
1982 Munich	Mark Breland (USA)	Serik Konakbayev (URS)	Manfred Zielonka (FRG)
1982 Munich	Mark Breland (USA)	Serik Konakbayev (URS)	Roland Omoruyi (NGR)
1986 Reno	Kenneth Gould (USA)	Candelario Duvergel (CUB)	Tibor Molnár (HUN)
1986 Reno	Kenneth Gould (USA)	Candelario Duvergel (CUB)	Torsten Schmitz (GDR)
1989 Moscow	Francisc Vaștag (ROU)	Siegfried Mehnert (GDR)	Raúl Márquez (USA)
1989 Moscow	Francisc Vaștag (ROU)	Siegfried Mehnert (GDR)	Vladimir Yereshchenko (URS)
1991 Sydney	Juan Hernández Sierra (CUB)	Andreas Otto (GER)	Francisc Vaștag (ROU)
1991 Sydney	Juan Hernández Sierra (CUB)	Andreas Otto (GER)	Stefan Scriggins (AUS)
1993 Tampere	Juan Hernández Sierra (CUB)	Vitalijus Karpačiauskas (LTU)	Sergiy Gorodniczev (UKR)
1993 Tampere	Juan Hernández Sierra (CUB)	Vitalijus Karpačiauskas (LTU)	Andreas Otto (GER)
1995 Berlin	Juan Hernández Sierra (CUB)	Oleg Saitov (RUS)	Nariman Ataev (UZB)
1995 Berlin	Juan Hernández Sierra (CUB)	Oleg Saitov (RUS)	Andreas Otto (GER)
1997 Budapest	Oleg Saitov (RUS)	Serhiy Dzyndzyruk (UKR)	Juan Hernández Sierra (CUB)
1997 Budapest	Oleg Saitov (RUS)	Serhiy Dzyndzyruk (UKR)	Marian Simion (ROU)
1999 Houston	Juan Hernández Sierra (CUB)	Timur Gaydalov (RUS)	Leonard Bundu (ITA)
1999 Houston	Juan Hernández Sierra (CUB)	Timur Gaydalov (RUS)	Lucian Bute (ROU)
2001 Belfast	Lorenzo Aragón (CUB)	Anthony Thompson (USA)	Sherzod Husanov (UZB)
2001 Belfast	Lorenzo Aragón (CUB)	Anthony Thompson (USA)	James Moore (IRE)
2003 Bangkok	Lorenzo Aragón (CUB)	Sherzod Husanov (UZB)	Andre Berto (USA)
2003 Bangkok	Lorenzo Aragón (CUB)	Sherzod Husanov (UZB)	Ruslan Khairov (AZE)
2005 Mianyang	Erislandy Lara (CUB)	Magomed Nurutdinov (BLR)	Bakhtiyar Artayev (KAZ)
2005 Mianyang	Erislandy Lara (CUB)	Magomed Nurutdinov (BLR)	Neil Perkins (ENG)
2007 Chicago	Demetrius Andrade (USA)	Non Boonjumnong (THA)	Adem Kılıçcı (TUR)
2007 Chicago	Demetrius Andrade (USA)	Non Boonjumnong (THA)	Hanati Silamu (CHN)
2009 Milan	Jack Culcay-Keth (GER)	Andrey Zamkovoy (RUS)	Botirjon Makhmudov (UZB)
2009 Milan	Jack Culcay-Keth (GER)	Andrey Zamkovoy (RUS)	Serik Sapiyev (KAZ)
2011 Baku	Taras Shelestyuk (UKR)	Serik Sapiyev (KAZ)	Egidijus Kavaliauskas (LTU)
2011 Baku	Taras Shelestyuk (UKR)	Serik Sapiyev (KAZ)	Vikas Krishan Yadav (IND)
2013 Almaty	Daniyar Yeleussinov (KAZ)	Arisnoidys Despaigne (CUB)	Arajik Marutjan (GER)
2013 Almaty	Daniyar Yeleussinov (KAZ)	Arisnoidys Despaigne (CUB)	Gabriel Maestre (VEN)
2015 Doha	Mohammed Rabii (MAR)	Daniyar Yeleussinov (KAZ)	Parviz Baghirov (AZE)
2015 Doha	Mohammed Rabii (MAR)	Daniyar Yeleussinov (KAZ)	Liu Wei (CHN)
2017 Hamburg	Shakhram Giyasov (UZB)	Roniel Iglesias (CUB)	Ablaikhan Zhussupov (KAZ)
2017 Hamburg	Shakhram Giyasov (UZB)	Roniel Iglesias (CUB)	Abass Baraou (GER)
2019 Yekaterinburg	Andrey Zamkovoy (RUS)	Pat McCormack (ENG)	Ablaikhan Zhussupov (KAZ)
2019 Yekaterinburg	Andrey Zamkovoy (RUS)	Pat McCormack (ENG)	Bobo-Usmon Baturov (UZB)
2021 Belgrade	Sewon Okazawa (JPN)	Omari Jones (USA)	Ablaikhan Zhussupov (KAZ)
2021 Belgrade	Sewon Okazawa (JPN)	Omari Jones (USA)	Lasha Guruli (GEO)
2023 Tashkent	Asadkhuja Muydinkhujaev (UZB)	Dulat Bekbauov (KAZ)	Lasha Guruli (GEO)
2023 Tashkent	Asadkhuja Muydinkhujaev (UZB)	Dulat Bekbauov (KAZ)	Battömöriin Misheelt (MGL)
2025 Dubai	Asadkhuja Muydinkhujaev (UZB)	Evgenii Kool (RUS)	Alexandru Paraschiv (MDA)
2025 Dubai	Asadkhuja Muydinkhujaev (UZB)	Evgenii Kool (RUS)	Hovhannes Bachkov (ARM)

== Light middleweight ==
- −71 kg: 1974–2001, 2021–

Games	Gold	Silver	Bronze
1974 Havana	Rolando Garbey (CUB)	Alfredo Lemus (VEN)	Anatoliy Klimanov (URS)
1974 Havana	Rolando Garbey (CUB)	Alfredo Lemus (VEN)	Joseph Nsubuga (UGA)
1978 Belgrade	Viktor Savchenko (URS)	Luis Martínez (CUB)	Jerzy Rybicki (POL)
1978 Belgrade	Viktor Savchenko (URS)	Luis Martínez (CUB)	Ilya Ilyev (BUL)
1982 Munich	Aleksandr Koshkin (URS)	Armando Martínez (CUB)	Tom Corr (IRE)
1982 Munich	Aleksandr Koshkin (URS)	Armando Martínez (CUB)	Mikhail Takov (BUL)
1986 Reno	Angel Espinosa (CUB)	Enrico Richter (GDR)	Manvel Avetisyan (URS)
1986 Reno	Angel Espinosa (CUB)	Enrico Richter (GDR)	Lotfi Ayed (SWE)
1989 Moscow	Israyel Hakobkokhyan (URS)	Torsten Schmitz (GDR)	Rudel Obreja (ROU)
1989 Moscow	Israyel Hakobkokhyan (URS)	Torsten Schmitz (GDR)	Salem Karim Kabbary (EGY)
1991 Sydney	Juan Carlos Lemus (CUB)	Israyel Hakobkokhyan (URS)	Torsten Schmitz (GER)
1991 Sydney	Juan Carlos Lemus (CUB)	Israyel Hakobkokhyan (URS)	Ole Klemetsen (NOR)
1993 Tampere	Francisc Vaștag (ROU)	Alfredo Duvergel (CUB)	Sergey Karavajev (RUS)
1993 Tampere	Francisc Vaștag (ROU)	Alfredo Duvergel (CUB)	Geir Hitland (NOR)
1995 Berlin	Francisc Vaștag (ROU)	Alfredo Duvergel (CUB)	(Serbia and Montenegro) Slaviša Popović (YUG)
1995 Berlin	Francisc Vaștag (ROU)	Alfredo Duvergel (CUB)	Markus Beyer (GER)
1997 Budapest	Alfredo Duvergel (CUB)	Yermakhan Ibraimov (KAZ)	Ercüment Aslan (TUR)
1997 Budapest	Alfredo Duvergel (CUB)	Yermakhan Ibraimov (KAZ)	Adrian Diaconu (ROU)
1999 Houston	Marian Simion (ROU)	Jorge Gutiérrez (CUB)	Frédéric Esther (FRA)
1999 Houston	Marian Simion (ROU)	Jorge Gutiérrez (CUB)	Yermakhan Ibraimov (KAZ)
2001 Belfast	Damián Austín (CUB)	Marian Simion (ROU)	Ciro Di Corcia (ITA)
2001 Belfast	Damián Austín (CUB)	Marian Simion (ROU)	Bülent Ulusoy (TUR)
2021 Belgrade	Yurii Zakharieiev (UKR)	(Russia) Vadim Musaev (RBF)	Alban Beqiri (ALB)
2021 Belgrade	Yurii Zakharieiev (UKR)	(Russia) Vadim Musaev (RBF)	Sarkhan Aliyev (AZE)
2023 Tashkent	Aslanbek Shymbergenov (KAZ)	Saidjamshid Jafarov (UZB)	Nishant Dev (IND)
2023 Tashkent	Aslanbek Shymbergenov (KAZ)	Saidjamshid Jafarov (UZB)	Wanderson de Oliveira (BRA)
2025 Dubai	Ablaikhan Zhussupov (KAZ)	Sergei Koldenkov (RUS)	Baýramdurdy Nurmuhammedow (TKM)
2025 Dubai	Ablaikhan Zhussupov (KAZ)	Sergei Koldenkov (RUS)	Ikhtiar Nishonov (KGZ)

== Middleweight ==
- −75 kg: 1974–

Games	Gold	Silver	Bronze
1974 Havana	Rufat Riskiyev (URS)	Alec Năstac (ROU)	Bernd Wittenburg (GDR)
1974 Havana	Rufat Riskiyev (URS)	Alec Năstac (ROU)	Dragan Vujković (YUG)
1978 Belgrade	José Gómez (CUB)	Tarmo Uusivirta (FIN)	Slobodan Kačar (YUG)
1978 Belgrade	José Gómez (CUB)	Tarmo Uusivirta (FIN)	Ilya Angelov (BUL)
1982 Munich	Bernardo Comas (CUB)	Tarmo Uusivirta (FIN)	Iran Barkley (USA)
1982 Munich	Bernardo Comas (CUB)	Tarmo Uusivirta (FIN)	Pedro van Raamsdonk (NED)
1986 Reno	Darin Allen (USA)	Henry Maske (GDR)	Julio Quintana (CUB)
1986 Reno	Darin Allen (USA)	Henry Maske (GDR)	Henryk Petrich (POL)
1989 Moscow	Andrey Kurnyavka (URS)	Angel Espinosa (CUB)	Zoltán Füzesy (HUN)
1989 Moscow	Andrey Kurnyavka (URS)	Angel Espinosa (CUB)	Sven Ottke (FRG)
1991 Sydney	Tommaso Russo (ITA)	Aleksandr Lebziak (URS)	Chris Johnson (CAN)
1991 Sydney	Tommaso Russo (ITA)	Aleksandr Lebziak (URS)	Ramón Garbey (CUB)
1993 Tampere	Ariel Hernández (CUB)	Akın Kuloğlu (TUR)	Raymond Joval (NED)
1993 Tampere	Ariel Hernández (CUB)	Akın Kuloğlu (TUR)	Vassiliy Jirov (KAZ)
1995 Berlin	Ariel Hernández (CUB)	Tomasz Borowski (POL)	Mohamed Mesbahi (MAR)
1995 Berlin	Ariel Hernández (CUB)	Tomasz Borowski (POL)	Dilshod Yarbekov (UZB)
1997 Budapest	Zsolt Erdei (HUN)	Ariel Hernández (CUB)	Dirk Eigenbrodt (GER)
1997 Budapest	Zsolt Erdei (HUN)	Ariel Hernández (CUB)	Jean-Paul Mendy (FRA)
1999 Houston	Utkirbek Haydarov (UZB)	Adrian Diaconu (ROU)	Yevgeniy Kasantsev (RUS)
1999 Houston	Utkirbek Haydarov (UZB)	Adrian Diaconu (ROU)	Akın Kuloğlu (TUR)
2001 Belfast	Andrey Gogolev (RUS)	Utkirbek Haydarov (UZB)	Yordanis Despaigne (CUB)
2001 Belfast	Andrey Gogolev (RUS)	Utkirbek Haydarov (UZB)	Carl Froch (ENG)
2003 Bangkok	Gennady Golovkin (KAZ)	Oleg Mashkin (UKR)	Yordanis Despaigne (CUB)
2003 Bangkok	Gennady Golovkin (KAZ)	Oleg Mashkin (UKR)	Nikola Sjekloća (SCG)
2005 Mianyang	Matvey Korobov (RUS)	Ismail Sillakh (UKR)	Emilio Correa (CUB)
2005 Mianyang	Matvey Korobov (RUS)	Ismail Sillakh (UKR)	Mohamed Hikal (EGY)
2007 Chicago	Matvey Korobov (RUS)	Alfonso Blanco (VEN)	Bakhtiyar Artayev (KAZ)
2007 Chicago	Matvey Korobov (RUS)	Alfonso Blanco (VEN)	Sergiy Derevyanchenko (UKR)
2009 Milan	Abbos Atoev (UZB)	Andranik Hakobyan (ARM)	Vijender Singh (IND)
2009 Milan	Abbos Atoev (UZB)	Andranik Hakobyan (ARM)	Alfonso Blanco (VEN)
2011 Baku	Evhen Khytrov (UKR)	Ryōta Murata (JPN)	Esquiva Florentino (BRA)
2011 Baku	Evhen Khytrov (UKR)	Ryōta Murata (JPN)	Bogdan Juratoni (ROU)
2013 Almaty	Janibek Alimkhanuly (KAZ)	Jason Quigley (IRE)	Anthony Fowler (ENG)
2013 Almaty	Janibek Alimkhanuly (KAZ)	Jason Quigley (IRE)	Artem Chebotarev (RUS)
2015 Doha	Arlen López (CUB)	Bektemir Melikuziev (UZB)	Hosam Abdin (EGY)
2015 Doha	Arlen López (CUB)	Bektemir Melikuziev (UZB)	Michael O'Reilly (IRL)
2017 Hamburg	Oleksandr Khyzhniak (UKR)	Abilkhan Amankul (KAZ)	Kamran Shakhsuvarly (AZE)
2017 Hamburg	Oleksandr Khyzhniak (UKR)	Abilkhan Amankul (KAZ)	Troy Isley (USA)
2019 Yekaterinburg	Gleb Bakshi (RUS)	Eumir Marcial (PHI)	Hebert Conceição (BRA)
2019 Yekaterinburg	Gleb Bakshi (RUS)	Eumir Marcial (PHI)	Tursynbay Kulakhmet (KAZ)
2021 Belgrade	Yoenlis Hernández (CUB)	(Russia) Dzhambulat Bizhamov (RBF)	Salvatore Cavallaro (ITA)
2021 Belgrade	Yoenlis Hernández (CUB)	(Russia) Dzhambulat Bizhamov (RBF)	Weerapon Jongjoho (TBF)
2023 Tashkent	Yoenlis Hernández (CUB)	Wanderley Pereira (BRA)	Alokhon Abdullaev (UZB)
2023 Tashkent	Yoenlis Hernández (CUB)	Wanderley Pereira (BRA)	Moreno Fendero (FRA)
2025 Dubai	Ismail Mutsolgov (RUS)	Sabirzhan Akkalykov (KAZ)	Fazliddin Erkinboev (UZB)
2025 Dubai	Ismail Mutsolgov (RUS)	Sabirzhan Akkalykov (KAZ)	Djibril Traoré (MLI)

== Light heavyweight ==
- −81 kg: 1974–2019
- −80 kg: 2021–

Games	Gold	Silver	Bronze
1974 Havana	Mate Parlov (YUG)	Oleg Korotayev (URS)	Ottomar Sachse (GDR)
1974 Havana	Mate Parlov (YUG)	Oleg Korotayev (URS)	Leon Spinks (USA)
1978 Belgrade	Sixto Soria (CUB)	Tadija Kačar (YUG)	Nikolay Erofyeev (URS)
1978 Belgrade	Sixto Soria (CUB)	Tadija Kačar (YUG)	Herbert Bauch (GDR)
1982 Munich	Pablo Romero (CUB)	Paweł Skrzecz (POL)	Valeri Shin (URS)
1982 Munich	Pablo Romero (CUB)	Paweł Skrzecz (POL)	Pero Tadić (YUG)
1986 Reno	Pablo Romero (CUB)	Vacant (Note: Loren Ross of the United States originally won the silver medal, but was disqualified for a doping violation.)	Damir Škaro (YUG)
1986 Reno	Pablo Romero (CUB)	Vacant	Deyan Kirilov (BUL)
1989 Moscow	Henry Maske (GDR)	Pablo Romero (CUB)	Nurmagomed Shanavazov (URS)
1989 Moscow	Henry Maske (GDR)	Pablo Romero (CUB)	Sándor Hranek (HUN)
1991 Sydney	Torsten May (GER)	Andrey Kurnyavka (URS)	Mehmet Gürgen (TUR)
1991 Sydney	Torsten May (GER)	Andrey Kurnyavka (URS)	Dale Brown (CAN)
1993 Tampere	Ramón Garbey (CUB)	Jacklord Jacobs (NGR)	Dale Brown (CAN)
1993 Tampere	Ramón Garbey (CUB)	Jacklord Jacobs (NGR)	Rostyslav Zaulychnyi (UKR)
1995 Berlin	Antonio Tarver (USA)	Dihosuany Vega (CUB)	Thomas Ulrich (GER)
1995 Berlin	Antonio Tarver (USA)	Dihosuany Vega (CUB)	Vassiliy Jirov (KAZ)
1997 Budapest	Aleksandr Lebziak (RUS)	Frédéric Serrat (FRA)	Isael Álvarez (CUB)
1997 Budapest	Aleksandr Lebziak (RUS)	Frédéric Serrat (FRA)	Stephen Kirk (IRE)
1999 Houston	Michael Simms (USA)	John Dovi (FRA)	Aleksey Trofimov (UKR)
1999 Houston	Michael Simms (USA)	John Dovi (FRA)	Ali Ismayilov (AZE)
2001 Belfast	Evgeny Makarenko (RUS)	Viktor Perun (UKR)	John Dovi (FRA)
2001 Belfast	Evgeny Makarenko (RUS)	Viktor Perun (UKR)	Claudio Rîșco (ROU)
2003 Bangkok	Evgeny Makarenko (RUS)	Magomed Aripgadjiev (BLR)	Rudolf Kraj (CZE)
2003 Bangkok	Evgeny Makarenko (RUS)	Magomed Aripgadjiev (BLR)	Aleksy Kuziemski (POL)
2005 Mianyang	Yerdos Zhanabergenov (KAZ)	Marijo Šivolija (CRO)	Utkirbek Haydarov (UZB)
2005 Mianyang	Yerdos Zhanabergenov (KAZ)	Marijo Šivolija (CRO)	Artak Malumyan (ARM)
2007 Chicago	Abbos Atoev (UZB)	Artur Beterbiev (RUS)	Daugirdas Šemiotas (LTU)
2007 Chicago	Abbos Atoev (UZB)	Artur Beterbiev (RUS)	Yerkebulan Shynaliyev (KAZ)
2009 Milan	Artur Beterbiev (RUS)	Elshod Rasulov (UZB)	José Larduet (CUB)
2009 Milan	Artur Beterbiev (RUS)	Elshod Rasulov (UZB)	Abdelkader Bouhenia (FRA)
2011 Baku	Julio César La Cruz (CUB)	Adilbek Niyazymbetov (KAZ)	Egor Mekhontsev (RUS)
2011 Baku	Julio César La Cruz (CUB)	Adilbek Niyazymbetov (KAZ)	Elshod Rasulov (UZB)
2013 Almaty	Julio César La Cruz (CUB)	Adilbek Niyazymbetov (KAZ)	Oybek Mamazulunov (UZB)
2013 Almaty	Julio César La Cruz (CUB)	Adilbek Niyazymbetov (KAZ)	Joe Ward (IRE)
2015 Doha	Julio César La Cruz (CUB)	Joe Ward (IRL)	Elshod Rasulov (UZB)
2015 Doha	Julio César La Cruz (CUB)	Joe Ward (IRL)	Pavel Silyagin (RUS)
2017 Hamburg	Julio César La Cruz (CUB)	Joe Ward (IRL)	Carlos Andrés Mina (ECU)
2017 Hamburg	Julio César La Cruz (CUB)	Joe Ward (IRL)	Bektemir Melikuziev (UZB)
2019 Yekaterinburg	Bekzad Nurdauletov (KAZ)	Dilshodbek Ruzmetov (UZB)	Julio César La Cruz (CUB)
2019 Yekaterinburg	Bekzad Nurdauletov (KAZ)	Dilshodbek Ruzmetov (UZB)	Benjamin Whittaker (ENG)
2021 Belgrade	Robby Gonzales (USA)	Aliaksei Alfiorau (BLR)	(Russia) Savelii Sadoma (RBF)
2021 Belgrade	Robby Gonzales (USA)	Aliaksei Alfiorau (BLR)	Vladimir Mironchikov (SRB)
2023 Tashkent	Nurbek Oralbay (KAZ)	Tuohetaerbieke Tanglatihan (CHN)	Gazimagomed Jalidov (ESP)
2023 Tashkent	Nurbek Oralbay (KAZ)	Tuohetaerbieke Tanglatihan (CHN)	Imam Khataev (RUS)
2025 Dubai	Dzhambulat Bizhamov (RUS)	Javokhir Ummataliev (UZB)	Arlen López (CUB)
2025 Dubai	Dzhambulat Bizhamov (RUS)	Javokhir Ummataliev (UZB)	Gazimagomed Jalidov (ESP)

== Cruiserweight ==
- –86 kg: 2021–

Games	Gold	Silver	Bronze
2021 Belgrade	Loren Alfonso (AZE)	Keno Machado (BRA)	Victor Schelstraete (BEL)
2021 Belgrade	Loren Alfonso (AZE)	Keno Machado (BRA)	Herich Ruiz (CUB)
2023 Tashkent	Sharabutdin Ataev (RUS)	Loren Alfonso (AZE)	Georgii Kushitashvili (GEO)
2023 Tashkent	Sharabutdin Ataev (RUS)	Loren Alfonso (AZE)	Rogelio Romero (MEX)
2025 Dubai	Sharabutdin Ataev (RUS)	Aliaksei Alfiorau (BLR)	Georgii Kushitashvili (GEO)
2025 Dubai	Sharabutdin Ataev (RUS)	Aliaksei Alfiorau (BLR)	Rafayel Hovhannisyan (ARM)

== Heavyweight ==
- +81 kg: 1974–1978
- −91 kg: 1982–2019
- −92 kg: 2021–

Games	Gold	Silver	Bronze
1974 Havana	Teófilo Stevenson (CUB)	Marvin Stinson (USA)	Fatai Ayinla (NGR)
1974 Havana	Teófilo Stevenson (CUB)	Marvin Stinson (USA)	Rajko Miljić (YUG)
1978 Belgrade	Teófilo Stevenson (CUB)	Dragan Vujković (YUG)	Carlos Rivera (VEN)
1978 Belgrade	Teófilo Stevenson (CUB)	Dragan Vujković (YUG)	Jürgen Fanghänel (GDR)
1982 Munich	Alexander Yagubkin (URS)	Jürgen Fanghänel (GDR)	Grzegorz Skrzecz (POL)
1982 Munich	Alexander Yagubkin (URS)	Jürgen Fanghänel (GDR)	Hermenegildo Baez (CUB)
1986 Reno	Félix Savón (CUB)	Arnold Vanderlyde (NED)	Svilen Rusinov (BUL)
1986 Reno	Félix Savón (CUB)	Arnold Vanderlyde (NED)	Michael Bentt (USA)
1989 Moscow	Félix Savón (CUB)	Evgeni Sudakov (URS)	Axel Schulz (GDR)
1989 Moscow	Félix Savón (CUB)	Evgeni Sudakov (URS)	Bert Teuchert (FRG)
1991 Sydney	Félix Savón (CUB)	Arnold Vanderlyde (NED)	David Tua (NZL)
1991 Sydney	Félix Savón (CUB)	Arnold Vanderlyde (NED)	Chae Sung-bae (KOR)
1993 Tampere	Félix Savón (CUB)	Georgi Kandelaki (GEO)	Stéphane Allouane (FRA)
1993 Tampere	Félix Savón (CUB)	Georgi Kandelaki (GEO)	Arszak Avartekyan (ARM)
1995 Berlin	Félix Savón (CUB)	Luan Krasniqi (GER)	Christophe Mendy (FRA)
1995 Berlin	Félix Savón (CUB)	Luan Krasniqi (GER)	Sinan Şamil Sam (TUR)
1997 Budapest	Félix Savón (CUB)	Mike Hanke (GER)	Tue Bjørn Thomsen (DEN)
1997 Budapest	Félix Savón (CUB)	Mike Hanke (GER)	Giacobbe Fragomeni (ITA)
1999 Houston	Michael Bennett (USA)	Félix Savón (CUB)	Kevin Evans (WAL)
1999 Houston	Michael Bennett (USA)	Félix Savón (CUB)	Steffen Kretschmann (GER)
2001 Belfast	Odlanier Solís (CUB)	David Haye (ENG)	Sultan Ibragimov (RUS)
2001 Belfast	Odlanier Solís (CUB)	David Haye (ENG)	Vyacheslav Uselkov (UKR)
2003 Bangkok	Odlanier Solís (CUB)	Aleksandr Alekseyev (RUS)	Steffen Kretschmann (GER)
2003 Bangkok	Odlanier Solís (CUB)	Aleksandr Alekseyev (RUS)	Viktar Zuyev (BLR)
2005 Mianyang	Aleksandr Alekseyev (RUS)	Elchin Alizade (AZE)	Jasur Matchanov (UZB)
2005 Mianyang	Aleksandr Alekseyev (RUS)	Elchin Alizade (AZE)	Alexander Povernov (GER)
2007 Chicago	Clemente Russo (ITA)	Rakhim Chakhkiev (RUS)	John M'Bumba (FRA)
2007 Chicago	Clemente Russo (ITA)	Rakhim Chakhkiev (RUS)	Yushan Nijiati (CHN)
2009 Milan	Egor Mekhontsev (RUS)	Osmay Acosta (CUB)	John M'Bumba (FRA)
2009 Milan	Egor Mekhontsev (RUS)	Osmay Acosta (CUB)	Oleksandr Usyk (UKR)
2011 Baku	Oleksandr Usyk (UKR)	Teymur Mammadov (AZE)	Siarhei Karneyeu (BLR)
2011 Baku	Oleksandr Usyk (UKR)	Teymur Mammadov (AZE)	Wang Xuanxuan (CHN)
2013 Almaty	Clemente Russo (ITA)	Evgeny Tishchenko (RUS)	Teymur Mammadov (AZE)
2013 Almaty	Clemente Russo (ITA)	Evgeny Tishchenko (RUS)	Yamil Peralta (ARG)
2015 Doha	Evgeny Tishchenko (RUS)	Erislandy Savón (CUB)	Abdulkadir Abdullayev (AZE)
2015 Doha	Evgeny Tishchenko (RUS)	Erislandy Savón (CUB)	Gevorg Manukian (UKR)
2017 Hamburg	Erislandy Savón (CUB)	Evgeny Tishchenko (RUS)	Sanjar Tursunov (UZB)
2017 Hamburg	Erislandy Savón (CUB)	Evgeny Tishchenko (RUS)	Vassiliy Levit (KAZ)
2019 Yekaterinburg	Muslim Gadzhimagomedov (RUS)	Julio Castillo (ECU)	Radoslav Pantaleev (BUL)
2019 Yekaterinburg	Muslim Gadzhimagomedov (RUS)	Julio Castillo (ECU)	Vassiliy Levit (KAZ)
2021 Belgrade	Julio César La Cruz (CUB)	Aziz Abbes Mouhiidine (ITA)	Madiyar Saydrakhimov (UZB)
2021 Belgrade	Julio César La Cruz (CUB)	Aziz Abbes Mouhiidine (ITA)	Enmanuel Reyes (ESP)
2023 Tashkent	Muslim Gadzhimagomedov (RUS)	Aziz Abbes Mouhiidine (ITA)	Lazizbek Mullojonov (UZB)
2023 Tashkent	Muslim Gadzhimagomedov (RUS)	Aziz Abbes Mouhiidine (ITA)	Narek Manasyan (ARM)
2025 Dubai	Muslim Gadzhimagomedov (RUS)	Turabek Khabibullaev (UZB)	Loren Alfonso (AZE)
2025 Dubai	Muslim Gadzhimagomedov (RUS)	Turabek Khabibullaev (UZB)	Enmanuel Reyes (ESP)

== Super heavyweight ==
- +91 kg: 1982–2019
- +92 kg: 2021–

Games	Gold	Silver	Bronze
1982 Munich	Tyrell Biggs (USA)	Francesco Damiani (ITA)	Peter Hussing (FRG)
1982 Munich	Tyrell Biggs (USA)	Francesco Damiani (ITA)	Petar Stoimenov (BUL)
1986 Reno	Teófilo Stevenson (CUB)	Alex García (USA)	Vyacheslav Yakovlev (URS)
1986 Reno	Teófilo Stevenson (CUB)	Alex García (USA)	Biaggio Chianese (ITA)
1989 Moscow	Roberto Balado (CUB)	Aleksandr Miroshnichenko (URS)	Maik Heydeck (GDR)
1989 Moscow	Roberto Balado (CUB)	Aleksandr Miroshnichenko (URS)	Ladislav Husarik (TCH)
1991 Sydney	Roberto Balado (CUB)	Svilen Rusinov (BUL)	Yevgeny Belousov (URS)
1991 Sydney	Roberto Balado (CUB)	Svilen Rusinov (BUL)	Larry Donald (USA)
1993 Tampere	Roberto Balado (CUB)	Svilen Rusinov (BUL)	Yevgeny Belousov (RUS)
1993 Tampere	Roberto Balado (CUB)	Svilen Rusinov (BUL)	Jo-el Scott (USA)
1995 Berlin	Alexei Lezin (RUS)	Vitali Klitschko (UKR)	René Monse (GER)
1995 Berlin	Alexei Lezin (RUS)	Vitali Klitschko (UKR)	Lawrence Clay-Bey (USA)
1997 Budapest	Georgi Kandelaki (GEO)	Alexis Rubalcaba (CUB)	Siarhei Liakhovich (BLR)
1997 Budapest	Georgi Kandelaki (GEO)	Alexis Rubalcaba (CUB)	Paolo Vidoz (ITA)
1999 Houston	Sinan Şamil Sam (TUR)	Mukhtarkhan Dildabekov (KAZ)	Felix Dyachuk (RUS)
1999 Houston	Sinan Şamil Sam (TUR)	Mukhtarkhan Dildabekov (KAZ)	Paolo Vidoz (ITA)
2001 Belfast	Ruslan Chagaev (UZB)	Oleksiy Mazikin (UKR)	Vitali Boot (GER)
2001 Belfast	Ruslan Chagaev (UZB)	Oleksiy Mazikin (UKR)	Pedro Carrión (CUB)
2003 Bangkok	Alexander Povetkin (RUS)	Pedro Carrión (CUB)	Sebastian Köber (GER)
2003 Bangkok	Alexander Povetkin (RUS)	Pedro Carrión (CUB)	Rustam Saidov (UZB)
2005 Mianyang	Odlanier Solís (CUB)	Roman Romanchuk (RUS)	Roberto Cammarelle (ITA)
2005 Mianyang	Odlanier Solís (CUB)	Roman Romanchuk (RUS)	Kubrat Pulev (BUL)
2007 Chicago	Roberto Cammarelle (ITA)	Vyacheslav Glazkov (UKR)	Zhang Zhilei (CHN)
2007 Chicago	Roberto Cammarelle (ITA)	Vyacheslav Glazkov (UKR)	Islam Timurziev (RUS)
2009 Milan	Roberto Cammarelle (ITA)	Roman Kapitonenko (UKR)	Viktar Zuyev (BLR)
2009 Milan	Roberto Cammarelle (ITA)	Roman Kapitonenko (UKR)	Zhang Zhilei (CHN)
2011 Baku	Magomedrasul Majidov (AZE)	Anthony Joshua (ENG)	Erik Pfeifer (GER)
2011 Baku	Magomedrasul Majidov (AZE)	Anthony Joshua (ENG)	Ivan Dychko (KAZ)
2013 Almaty	Magomedrasul Majidov (AZE)	Ivan Dychko (KAZ)	Roberto Cammarelle (ITA)
2013 Almaty	Magomedrasul Majidov (AZE)	Ivan Dychko (KAZ)	Erik Pfeifer (GER)
2015 Doha	Tony Yoka (FRA)	Ivan Dychko (KAZ)	Bakhodir Jalolov (UZB)
2015 Doha	Tony Yoka (FRA)	Ivan Dychko (KAZ)	Joe Joyce (GBR)
2017 Hamburg	Magomedrasul Majidov (AZE)	Kamshybek Kunkabayev (KAZ)	Arsène Fokou Fosso (CMR)
2017 Hamburg	Magomedrasul Majidov (AZE)	Kamshybek Kunkabayev (KAZ)	Joseph Goodall (AUS)
2019 Yekaterinburg	Bakhodir Jalolov (UZB)	Kamshybek Kunkabayev (KAZ)	Maksim Babanin (RUS)
2019 Yekaterinburg	Bakhodir Jalolov (UZB)	Kamshybek Kunkabayev (KAZ)	Justis Huni (AUS)
2021 Belgrade	(Russia) Mark Petrovskii (RBF)	Davit Chaloyan (ARM)	Mahammad Abdullayev (AZE)
2021 Belgrade	(Russia) Mark Petrovskii (RBF)	Davit Chaloyan (ARM)	Nigel Paul (TTO)
2023 Tashkent	Bakhodir Jalolov (UZB)	Fernando Arzola (CUB)	Mahammad Abdullayev (AZE)
2023 Tashkent	Bakhodir Jalolov (UZB)	Fernando Arzola (CUB)	Ayoub Ghadfa (ESP)
2025 Dubai	David Surov (RUS)	Arman Makhanov (UZB)	Davit Chaloyan (ARM)
2025 Dubai	David Surov (RUS)	Arman Makhanov (UZB)	Mahammad Abdullayev (AZE)

== Multiple gold medalists ==
Boldface denotes active amateur boxers and highest medal count among all boxers (including these who not included in these tables) per type.

Rank	Boxer	Country	Weights	From	To	Gold	Silver	Bronze	Total
1	Félix Savón	Cuba	91 kg	1986	1999	**6**	1	–	**7**
2	**Julio César La Cruz**	Cuba	81 kg / 92 kg	2011	2021	5	–	1	6
3	Juan Hernández Sierra	Cuba	67 kg	1991	1999	4	–	1	5
4	**Lázaro Álvarez**	Cuba	56 kg / 60 kg / 57 kg	2011	2019	3	2	–	5
5	Serafim Todorov	Bulgaria	54 kg / 57 kg	1989	1995	3	1	–	4
5	Zou Shiming	China	48 kg / 49 kg	2003	2011	3	1	–	4
7	Francisc Vaștag	Romania	67 kg / 71 kg	1989	1995	3	–	1	4
8	Roberto Balado	Cuba	+91 kg	1989	1993	3	–	–	3
8	Andy Cruz	Cuba	64 kg / 63 kg / 63.5 kg	2017	2021	3	–	–	3
8	**Muslim Gadzhimagomedov**	Russia	91 kg / 92 kg	2019	2025	3	–	–	3
8	Adolfo Horta	Cuba	54 kg / 57 kg / 60 kg	1978	1986	3	–	–	3
8	Mario Kindelán	Cuba	60 kg	1999	2003	3	–	–	3
8	Magomedrasul Majidov	Azerbaijan	+91 kg	2011	2017	3	–	–	3
8	**Sofiane Oumiha**	France	60 kg	2017	2023	3	–	–	3
8	Odlanier Solís	Cuba	91 kg / +91 kg	2001	2005	3	–	–	3
8	Teófilo Stevenson	Cuba	+81 kg / +91 kg	1974	1986	3	–	–	3
17	Serik Sapiyev	Kazakhstan	64 kg / 69 kg	2005	2011	2	1	1	4
18	**Hasanboy Dusmatov**	Uzbekistan	49 kg / 51 kg	2017	2025	2	1	–	3
18	Ariel Hernández	Cuba	75 kg	1993	1997	2	1	–	3
18	Vasyl Lomachenko	Ukraine	57 kg / 60 kg	2007	2011	2	1	–	3
18	Pablo Romero	Cuba	81 kg	1982	1989	2	1	–	3
22	Roberto Cammarelle	Italy	+91 kg	2005	2013	2	–	2	4
23	Mikhail (Misha) Aloyan	Russia	51 kg / 52 kg	2009	2013	2	–	1	3
23	**Saken Bibossinov**	Kazakhstan	52 kg / 51 kg / 54 kg	2019	2025	2	–	1	3
23	Bakhodir Jalolov	Uzbekistan	+91 kg / +92 kg	2015	2023	2	–	1	3
26	Lorenzo Aragón	Cuba	67 kg / 69 kg	2001	2003	2	–	–	2
26	Joahnys Argilagos	Cuba	49 kg	2015	2017	2	–	–	2
26	**Sharabutdin Ataev**	Russia	86 kg	2023	2025	2	–	–	2
26	Abbos Atoev	Uzbekistan	81 kg / 75 kg	2007	2009	2	–	–	2
26	Eric Griffin	United States	48 kg	1989	1991	2	–	–	2
26	**Yoenlis Hernández**	Cuba	75 kg	2021	2023	2	–	–	2
26	Matvey Korobov	Russia	75 kg	2005	2007	2	–	–	2
26	Evgeny Makarenko	Russia	81 kg	2001	2003	2	–	–	2
26	Raimkul Malakhbekov	Russia	54 kg	1995	1997	2	–	–	2
26	**Asadkhuja Muydinkhujaev**	Uzbekistan	67 kg	2023	2025	2	–	–	2
26	Guillermo Rigondeaux	Cuba	54 kg	2001	2005	2	–	–	2
26	Clemente Russo	Italy	91 kg	2007	2013	2	–	–	2
26	Héctor Vinent	Cuba	63.5 kg	1993	1995	2	–	–	2
