= IBA Men's World Boxing Championships =

Boxing competitions

IBA World Boxing Championships
- Status: active
- Genre: sports event
- Date: varying
- Frequency: biennial
- Location: various
- Inaugurated: 1974
- Organiser: IBA

The IBA Men's World Boxing Championships are biennial amateur boxing competitions organised by the International Boxing Association (IBA, previously known as AIBA), which is one of the two primary governing bodies of the sport at amateur level. Alongside the Olympic boxing programme, they are historically considered the highest level of competition for the sport. The championships were first held for men in 1974. Since 1989 the men's championships are held every odd year.

Following the derecognition of the IBA by the International Olympic Committee an IOC-recognised organisation, World Boxing inaugurated its own elite level World Boxing Championships, but the IBA continues to organise its world championships under its own patronage.

== Weight classes ==
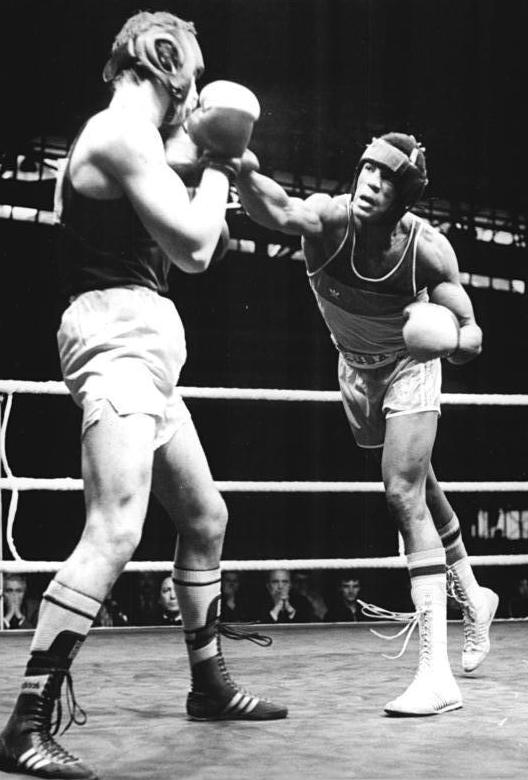
Cuban Felix Savon is the most successful boxer in the World Amateur Boxing Championships (Men's editions) of all time having won 6 gold medals as a heavyweight.

As of 1 August 2021, men are grouped into 13 weight classes as follows:

- 46–48 kg (Minimumweight)
- 48–51 kg (Flyweight)
- 51–54 kg (Bantamweight)
- 54–57 kg (Featherweight)
- 57–60 kg (Lightweight)
- 60–63.5 kg (Light welterweight)
- 63.5–67 kg (Welterweight)
- 67–71 kg (Light middleweight)
- 71–75 kg (Middleweight)
- 75–80 kg (Light heavyweight)
- 80–86 kg (Cruiserweight)
- 86–92 kg (Heavyweight)
- +92 kg (Super heavyweight)

== Editions ==
Number	Year	Host	Dates	Venue	Events	Nations	Boxers
1	1974	Havana, Cuba	17–30 August	Coliseo de la Ciudad Deportiva	11	45	274
2	1978	(Socialist Federal Republic of Yugoslavia) Belgrade, Yugoslavia	6–20 May	Pionir Sports Hall	11	41	219
3	1982	Munich, West Germany	4–15 May	Olympiahalle	12	45	271
4	1986	Reno, United States	8–18 May	Reno-Sparks Convention Center	12	38	235
5	1989	Moscow, Soviet Union	17 September – 1 October	Olympic Stadium	12	43	236
6	1991	Sydney, Australia	14–23 November	State Sports Centre	12	48	242
7	1993	Tampere, Finland	7–16 May	Tampere Ice Stadium	12	53	270
8	1995	Berlin, Germany	4–15 May	Deutschlandhalle	12	62	351
9	1997	Budapest, Hungary	18–26 October	Budapest Sportcsarnok	12	67	350
10	1999	Houston, United States	15–29 August	George R. Brown Convention Center	12	54	278
11	2001	Belfast, United Kingdom	3–10 June	Odyssey Arena	12	67	334
12	2003	Bangkok, Thailand	6–13 July	Nimibutr Stadium	11	68	338
13	2005	Mianyang, China	13–20 November	Jiu Zhou Gymnasium	11	74	412
14	2007	Chicago, United States	23 October – 3 November	UIC Pavilion	11	101	557
15	2009	Milan, Italy	1–12 September	Mediolanum Forum	11	133	554
16	2011	Baku, Azerbaijan	22 September – 10 October	Heydar Aliyev Sports	10	127	685
17	2013	Almaty, Kazakhstan	14–26 October	Baluan Sholak Sports Palace	10	116	576
18	2015	Doha, Qatar	5–18 October	Ali Bin Hamad al-Attiyah Arena	10	73	260
19	2017	Hamburg, Germany	25 August – 3 September	Alsterdorfer Sporthalle	10	85	279
20	2019	Yekaterinburg, Russia	8–21 September	Ekaterinburg Expo	8	78	365
21	2021	Belgrade, Serbia	25 October – 6 November	Štark Arena	13	88	510
22	2023	Tashkent, Uzbekistan	30 April – 14 May	Humo Arena	13	107	538
23	2025	Dubai, United Arab Emirates	4–13 December	Dubai Duty Free Tennis Stadium	13	109	428

== All-time medal table (1974–2025) ==
Updated after the 2025 IBA Men's World Boxing Championships.

Rank	Nation	Gold	Silver	Bronze	Total
1	Cuba	81	38	31	150
2	Russia	35	26	27	88
3	Kazakhstan	21	17	24	62
4	United States (Note: 1986 silver medalists Luis Román Rolón (48 kg, Puerto Rico) and Loren Ross (81 kg, United States) were disqualified for doping and stripped of their medals, which were not transferred to other athletes.)	18	13	19	50
5	Uzbekistan	16	21	24	61
6	Soviet Union	15	11	17	43
7	Bulgaria	8	8	19	35
8	Azerbaijan	8	5	14	27
9	Ukraine	7	12	11	30
10	Romania	7	5	17	29
11	France	6	7	17	30
12	Italy	6	4	15	25
13	Germany	4	6	25	35
14	China	3	2	9	14
15	Hungary	3	1	6	10
16	Turkey	2	4	11	17
17	South Korea	2	3	8	13
18	Puerto Rico	2	1	3	6
19	Japan	2	1	2	5
20	East Germany	1	8	15	24
21	Yugoslavia	1	6	10	17
22	Mongolia	1	5	8	14
23	England	1	4	9	14
24	Ireland	1	3	9	13
24	Poland	1	3	9	13
26	Brazil	1	3	6	10
27	Thailand	1	3	5	9
28	Armenia	1	2	14	17
29	Georgia	1	2	10	13
30	(Russia) Russian Boxing Federation (Note: At the 2021 championships, in accordance with a ban by WADA and a decision by CAS, Russian boxers were not permitted to use the Russian name, flag, or anthem. They instead participated as the Russian Boxing Federation and under the Russian Olympic Committee flag.)	1	2	2	5
31	Nigeria	1	1	3	5
32	Kenya	1	1	0	2
33	Morocco	1	0	2	3
34	Uganda	1	0	1	2
35	Venezuela	0	5	6	11
36	Belarus	0	4	7	11
37	Philippines	0	3	3	6
38	Finland	0	3	2	5
39	North Korea	0	2	5	7
40	Algeria	0	2	2	4
40	Netherlands	0	2	2	4
42	India	0	1	9	10
43	Tajikistan	0	1	5	6
44	Canada	0	1	4	5
45	Lithuania	0	1	3	4
46	Argentina	0	1	2	3
46	Kyrgyzstan	0	1	2	3
46	Thailand Boxing Federation (Note: At the 2021 championships, in accordance with a ban by WADA, Thai boxers participated as the Thailand Boxing Federation, under the AIBA flag.)	0	1	2	3
46	Wales	0	1	2	3
50	Croatia	0	1	1	2
50	Ecuador	0	1	1	2
52	Spain	0	0	7	7
53	West Germany	0	0	6	6
54	Australia	0	0	5	5
54	Egypt	0	0	5	5
56	Sweden	0	0	4	4
57	Czech Republic	0	0	3	3
58	Dominican Republic	0	0	2	2
58	Mexico	0	0	2	2
58	Norway	0	0	2	2
58	Serbia and Montenegro	0	0	2	2
58	Slovakia	0	0	2	2
58	Zambia	0	0	2	2
64	Albania	0	0	1	1
64	Belgium	0	0	1	1
64	Cameroon	0	0	1	1
64	Colombia	0	0	1	1
64	Costa Rica	0	0	1	1
64	Czechoslovakia	0	0	1	1
64	Denmark	0	0	1	1
64	Ghana	0	0	1	1
64	Great Britain	0	0	1	1
64	Iran	0	0	1	1
64	Jordan	0	0	1	1
64	Mali	0	0	1	1
64	Nepal	0	0	1	1
64	New Zealand	0	0	1	1
64	Pakistan	0	0	1	1
64	Panama	0	0	1	1
64	Scotland	0	0	1	1
64	Serbia	0	0	1	1
64	Trinidad and Tobago	0	0	1	1
64	Turkmenistan	0	0	1	1
Totals (83 entries)		261	259	522	1,042

== Multiple gold medalists ==
Boldface denotes active amateur boxers and highest medal count among all boxers (including these who not included in these tables) per type.

Rank	Boxer	Country	Weights	From	To	Gold	Silver	Bronze	Total
1	Félix Savón	Cuba	91 kg	1986	1999	**6**	1	–	**7**
2	**Julio César La Cruz**	Cuba	81 kg / 92 kg	2011	2021	5	–	1	6
3	Juan Hernández Sierra	Cuba	67 kg	1991	1999	4	–	1	5
4	**Lázaro Álvarez**	Cuba	56 kg / 60 kg / 57 kg	2011	2019	3	2	–	5
5	Serafim Todorov	Bulgaria	54 kg / 57 kg	1989	1995	3	1	–	4
5	Zou Shiming	China	48 kg / 49 kg	2003	2011	3	1	–	4
7	Francisc Vaștag	Romania	67 kg / 71 kg	1989	1995	3	–	1	4
8	Roberto Balado	Cuba	+91 kg	1989	1993	3	–	–	3
8	Andy Cruz	Cuba	64 kg / 63 kg / 63.5 kg	2017	2021	3	–	–	3
8	**Muslim Gadzhimagomedov**	Russia	91 kg / 92 kg	2019	2025	3	–	–	3
8	Adolfo Horta	Cuba	54 kg / 57 kg / 60 kg	1978	1986	3	–	–	3
8	Mario Kindelán	Cuba	60 kg	1999	2003	3	–	–	3
8	Magomedrasul Majidov	Azerbaijan	+91 kg	2011	2017	3	–	–	3
8	**Sofiane Oumiha**	France	60 kg	2017	2023	3	–	–	3
8	Odlanier Solís	Cuba	91 kg / +91 kg	2001	2005	3	–	–	3
8	Teófilo Stevenson	Cuba	+81 kg / +91 kg	1974	1986	3	–	–	3

== See also ==
- List of medalists at the IBA World Boxing Championships
- List of medalists at the IBA Women's World Boxing Championships
