= Alcides Sagarra Carón =

Cuban sport official

Dr. Alcides Sagarra
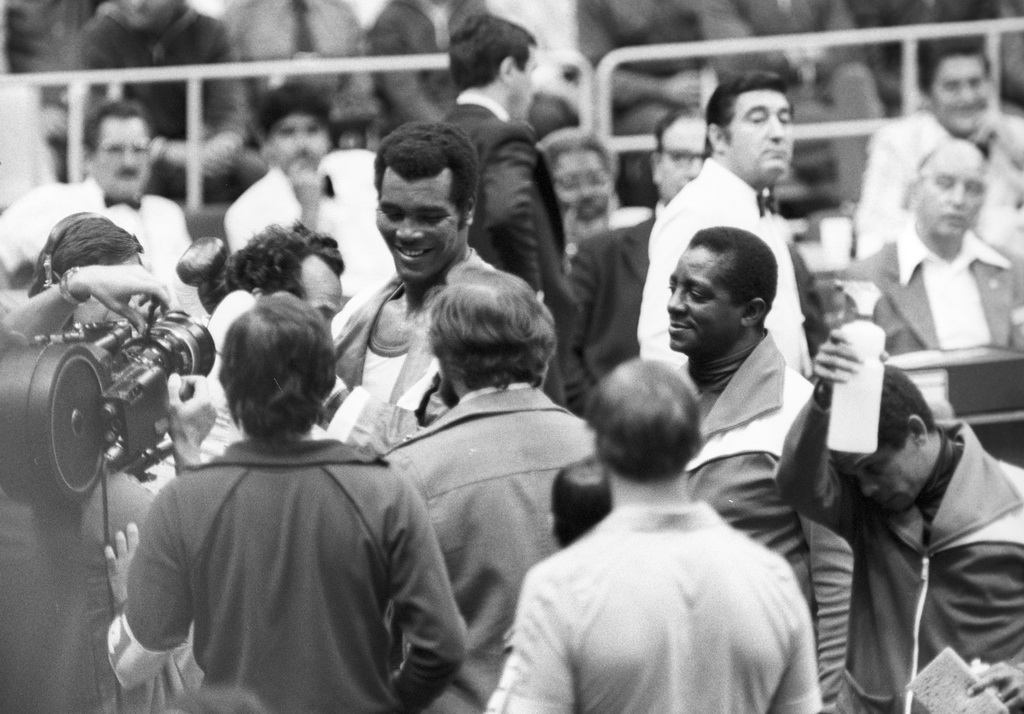
- Alcides Sagarra (center right) and Teófilo Stevenson meeting with the press at the Olimpiyski Sport Complex during the 1980 Summer Olympics

Personal information
- Full name: Alcides Sagarra Carón
- Nickname: "El Maestro"
- Born: August 18, 1936 (age 89) Santiago Cuba
- Occupation: Boxing trainer

Sport
- Country: Cuba
- Sport: Amateur boxing
- Retired: 2001
Cuban Team achievements under Sagarra
World
Event	1st	2nd	3rd
Olympic Games	32
Friendship Games	11	1	0
Goodwill Games
World Championships	63
World Cup
Youth, Jr and Cadet World Championships	64
Military Spartakiads of the Friendly Armies
Regional
Event	1st	2nd	3rd
Pan American Games
Central American and Caribbean Games
Central American and Caribbean Championships
North American Championships
Total

Dr. Alcides Sagarra Carón (born August 18, 1936) is a Cuban sport official best known for moulding the amateur boxing team into a dominant force during his reign as the coach of the Cuban National Boxing Team (1964–2001) for which he gained an honorary soubriquet "El Maestro" (="The Master").

== Career ==
Alcides was born in Santiago de Cuba.

Between 1951 and 1954 he was an active boxer himself but quit due to his asthma. He worked as a mechanic but kept studying at the Sports Institute Manuel Fajardo.

In 1962 he became coach who quickly gained the reputation of being a strict disciplinarian, in 1963 he prepared the boxers of Havanna Province for the national championships. He sought the help of East German professor Kurt Rosentil to develop all kinds of innovative training methods. He was so successful that as early as 1964 he was promoted to national head coach. Also instrumental was Andrey Chervonenko, a Soviet coach sent to share training techniques as a display of Communism solidarity. The first stars of the team were Enrique Regüeiferos (63,5 kilograms), Rolando Garbey (71 kg) and Roberto Caminero (60 kg) Cuba's first PanAm champ 1963.

Cuba medaled at the Olympics for the first time in 1968 (Regüeiferos, Garbey). He helped to develop the skills of amateur superstars like three time Olympic gold medalists Teofilo Stevenson who upset Duane Bobick by KO in 1972 to start heavyweight dominance and Félix Savón.

In 1992 the University of Havana awarded him a scientific title of "Doctor en Ciencias Pedagógicas". 2001 he retired from his post as national coach the post is now occupied by Sarbelio Fuentes.

His record is 32 Olympic Golds, 63 (senior) World championships, 64 junior/cadet World titles.

He also has a minor function in an AIBA commission.

== Fighters trained ==
=== Cuban National Team boxers ===
Name	Weight Class	Notes
Roberto Balado	heavyweight	
Enrique Carrión	bantamweight	
Alfredo Duvergel	middleweight	
Candelario Duvergel	welterweight	
Angel Espinosa	middleweight	
Rolando Garbey	light middleweight	
Julio González	lightweight	
Raúl González	flyweight	
Roberto Guerra	welterweight	
Jorge Gutiérrez	middleweight	
Ariel Hernández	middleweight	
Jorge Hernández	flyweight	
Juan Bautista Hernández Pérez	bantamweight	
Juan Hernández Sierra	welterweight	
Ángel Herrera Vera	lightweight	
Adolfo Horta	featherweight	
Mario Kindelán	lightweight	
Rogelio Marcelo	flyweight	
Armando Martínez	middleweight	
Luis Martínez	middleweight	
Orlando Palacios	featherweight	
Hipólito Ramos	light flyweight	
Enrique Regüeiferos	light welterweight	
Pedro Orlando Reyes	flyweight	
Douglas Rodríguez	flyweight	
Freddy Rojas	light heavyweight	
Ricardo Rojas Frías	light heavyweight	
Maikro Romero	flyweight	
Pablo Romero	light heavyweight	
Félix Savón	heavyweight	
Sixto Soria	light heavyweight	
Teófilo Stevenson	heavyweight	
Eddy Suarez	bantamweight	
Reinaldo Valiente	lightweight	
Héctor Vinent	light welterweight	

=== Cuban boxers who later turned pro ===
Name	Weight Class	Notes
Pedro Carrión	heavyweight	
Joel Casamayor	featherweight	
Eliseo Castillo	light heavyweight	
Eliecer Castillo	heavyweight	
Juan Carlos Gómez	light heavyweight	
Jorge Luis González	heavyweight	
Diosbelys Hurtado	lightweight	
Guillermo Rigondeaux	bantamweight	
Alexis Rubalcaba	heavyweight	
Odlanier Solís	heavyweight	

=== Other Cuban boxers ===
Name	Weight Class	Notes
Eulalio Puentes Martinez	lightweight	

Name	Weight Class	Notes
Mario Martos Pedroza	lightweight	

"El maestro" is considered the best boxer trainer of all times.
