= Campeonato Nacional de Boxeo Playa Girón =

Cuban amateur boxing championship

The Campeonato Nacional de Boxeo Playa Girón or Torneo Playa Girón is the yearly Cuban amateur boxing championship. A group of boxers represent each Cuban province, with the winner in each weight class being declared the national champion. The province whose boxers obtain the best results wins the tournament as well. The first edition took place in March 1962. Currently, the tournament is held every December and it is recognized by AIBA. The tournament is held at the Playa Girón beach, in Matanzas.

== 5-time champions ==
The following is a list of boxers who have won the tournament 5 or more times. Boldface denotes active boxers.

Boxer	Weight class	Titles won	Years
Félix Savón	91 kg	13	1985, 1986, 1987, 1988, 1989, 1990, 1991, 1992, 1993, 1994, 1995, 1996, 1998
Teófilo Stevenson	+81 kg / +91 kg	11	1972, 1973, 1974, 1976, 1978, 1979, 1980, 1981, 1982, 1984, 1986
Adolfo Horta	54 kg / 57 kg / 60 kg	11	1976, 1977, 1978, 1979, 1980, 1981, 1982, 1983, 1984, 1985, 1986
**Roniel Iglesias**	51 kg / 64 kg / 69 kg	11	2005, 2008, 2010, 2011, 2012, 2013, 2014, 2015, 2016, 2017, 2018
**Julio César La Cruz**	81 kg / 91 kg	11	2008, 2010, 2011, 2012, 2013, 2014, 2015, 2016, 2017, 2018, 2019
Lorenzo Aragón	51 kg / 57 kg / 60 kg / 63.5 kg / 67 kg / 69 kg	10	1992, 1994, 1995, 1996, 1997, 1998, 1999, 2001, 2003, 2004
Juan Hernández Sierra	67 kg	9	1990, 1991, 1992, 1993, 1994, 1995, 1996, 1997, 2000
**Yosvany Veitía**	49 kg / 52 kg	9	2011, 2012, 2013, 2014, 2015, 2016, 2017, 2018, 2019
Candelario Duvergel	63.5 kg / 67 kg	8	1983, 1984, 1985, 1986, 1987, 1989, 1990, 1991
Enrique Carrión	51 kg / 54 kg / 57 kg	8	1987, 1988, 1989, 1990, 1993, 1995, 1998, 1999
Angel Espinosa	63.5 kg / 71 kg / 75 kg / 81 kg	7	1984, 1985, 1986, 1987, 1988, 1989, 1991
Ariel Hernández	75 kg	7	1992, 1993, 1994, 1995, 1996, 1997, 1998
Odlanier Solís	91 kg / +91 kg	7	1999, 2000, 2001, 2002, 2003, 2004, 2006
Guillermo Rigondeaux	54 kg	7	2000, 2001, 2002, 2003, 2004, 2005, 2006
Yasniel Toledo	54 kg / 60 kg / 64 kg	7	2007, 2010, 2011, 2012, 2013, 2014, 2015
Emilio Correa	67 kg / 71 kg	6	1972, 1973, 1974, 1975, 1976, 1977
Alejandro Montoya	75 kg	6	1972, 1973, 1974, 1975, 1976, 1981
Ángel Herrera Vera	57 kg / 60 kg	6	1977, 1978, 1979, 1982, 1983, 1984
Pablo Romero	81 kg	6	1982, 1984, 1985, 1986, 1987, 1988
Pedro Orlando Reyes	51 kg	6	1982, 1983, 1984, 1985, 1986, 1988
Héctor Vinent	63.5 kg / 67 kg	6	1992, 1993, 1994, 1995, 1996, 1998
Maikro Romero	48 kg / 51 kg	6	1992, 1993, 1994, 1997, 1999, 2000
**Erislandy Savón**	91 kg / +91 kg	6	2011, 2013, 2014, 2016, 2017, 2018
**Arlen López**	75 kg / 81 kg	6	2014, 2015, 2016, 2017, 2018, 2019
Orlando Martínez	48 kg / 51 kg / 54 kg	5	1964, 1967, 1969, 1973, 1975
Andrés Aldama	67 kg	5	1977, 1978, 1979, 1981, 1982
José Gómez Mustelier	75 kg	5	1978, 1979, 1980, 1982, 1983
Juan Torres Odelín	48 kg	5	1982, 1984, 1985, 1987, 1988
Orestes Solano	71 kg / 75 kg / 81 kg	5	1984, 1987, 1990, 1991, 1992
Arnaldo Mesa	54 kg / 57 kg	5	1987, 1988, 1989, 1990, 1992
Julio González Valladares	60 kg	5	1987, 1989, 1990, 1991, 1992
Mario Kindelán	60 kg	5	1999, 2000, 2001, 2002, 2003
Yohanson Martínez	81 kg	5	1999, 2001, 2002, 2003, 2004
Yordenis Ugás	60 kg / 64 kg	5	2005, 2006, 2007, 2008, 2009
Robeisy Ramírez	52 kg / 56 kg	5	2011, 2012, 2014, 2015, 2017
Lázaro Álvarez	60 kg	5	2013, 2014, 2015, 2017, 2018

== See also ==
- Amateur boxing
- Boxing in Cuba
