= Torsten Schmitz =

German boxer

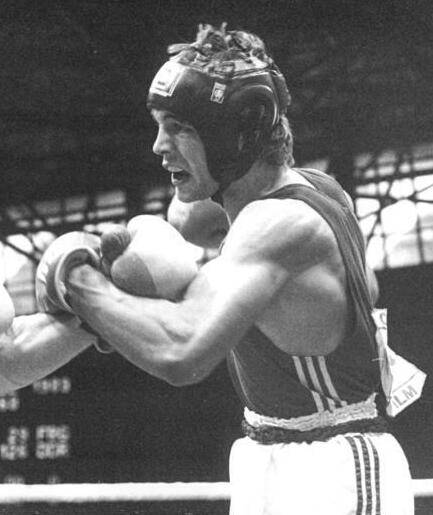
- Schmitz in 1989

Personal information
- Full name: Torsten Schmitz
- Nationality: East Germany
- Born: 26 August 1964 (age 62) Crivitz, Bezirk Schwerin, East Germany
- Height: 1.81 m (5 ft 11 in)
- Weight: 72 kg (159 lb)

Sport
- Sport: Boxing
- Weight class: Light Middleweight
- Club: Schweriner SC, Schwerin
Medal record
Representing East Germany
World Amateur Championships
Silver medal – second place	1989 Moscow	Light Middleweight
Bronze medal – third place	1986 Reno	Welterweight
Friendship Games
Gold medal – first place	1984 Havana	Welterweight
Representing Germany
World Amateur Championships
Bronze medal – third place	1991 Sydney	Light Middleweight
European Amateur Championships
Silver medal – second place	1991 Gothenburg	Light Middleweight

Torsten Schmitz (born 26 August 1964 in Crivitz) is a retired German boxer in the Light Middleweight class. He represented East Germany at the 1988 Summer Olympics.

== Amateur career ==
Schmitz was an amateur standout and fought in several notable European tournaments, compiling a record of 215–35.

=== Amateur highlights ===
- 1982 Junior European Champion at Welterweight in Schwerin, Germany
  - Defeated Luciano Bruno (Italy) in the final.
- 1984 1st place at the Friendship Games in Havana, Cuba as a Welterweight
  - Defeated Khaidavyn Gantulga (Mongolia) RSCI 3
  - Defeated Luis Garcia (Venezuela) PTS (5–0)
  - Defeated Jose Luis Hernandez (Cuba) PTS (4–1)
- 1985 competed at the European Championships in Budapest, Hungary as a Welterweight
  - Defeated Jacek Olejniczak (Poland) PTS (4–1)
  - Lost to Borislav Abadzhiev (Bulgaria) PTS (2–3)
- 1986 3rd place at World Championships in Reno, United States as a Welterweight
  - Defeated Stefan Driscu (Romania) PTS (4–1)
  - Defeated Kim Dong-Kil (South Korea) PTS (5–0)
  - Defeated Israel Akopkokhyan (Soviet Union) PTS (3–2)
  - Lost to Candelario Duvergel (Cuba) PTS (2–3)
- 1988 competed at the Seoul Olympics as a Light Middleweight
  - Defeated Angel Stoyanov (Bulgaria) PTS (3–2)
  - Lost to Park Si-hun (South Korea) PTS (0–5)
- 1989 2nd place as a Light Middleweight at the World Championships in Moscow, USSR
  - Defeated Fikret Kaman (Turkey) PTS (13–9)
  - Defeated Laszlo Gal (Hungary) PTS (18–9)
  - Defeated Erik Bredler (Sweden) PTS (14–6)
  - Defeated Kabary Salem (Egypt) PTS (15–2)
  - Lost to Israel Akopkokhyan (Soviet Union) PTS (8–19)
- 1990 2nd place at the Goodwill Games in Seattle, USA
  - Defeated Chris Byrd (USA) PTS (3–2)
  - Defeated Alexander Lebziak (Soviet Union) PTS (4–1)
  - Lost to Israel Akopkokhyan (Soviet Union) PTS (2–3)
- 1991 3rd place as a Light Middleweight at World Championships in Sydney, Australia
  - Defeated Orhan Delibaş (Netherlands) PTS (18–14)
  - Defeated Jan Dydak (Poland) PTS (20–12)
  - Defeated Stefan Driscu (Romania) PTS (17–7)
  - Lost to Juan Carlos Lemus (Cuba) RSC-2
- 1991 2nd place at European Championships in Gothenborg, Sweden
  - Lost the final to Israel Akopkokhyan (Soviet Union)

== Trainer ==
Since 1996 Schmitz is working as coach for Universum Box-Promotion. Trained/Trains Regina Halmich, Bert Schenk, Armand Krajnc, Luan Krasniqi, Michael Trabant, and Alesia Graf.
