= Odelín =

Odelín is both a given name and a surname. Notable people with the name include:

== Surnames ==
- Arnaes Odelín (born 1998), Cuban judoka
- Juan Torres Odelín (born 1960), Cuban boxer
- Vicyohandri Odelín (born 1980), Cuban baseball pitcher

== Given names ==
- Odelín Molina (born 1974), Cuban footballer
