= Tonga McClain =

American boxer

Personal information
- Weight: Lightweight

Boxing career
Medal record
Men's amateur boxing
Representing United States
World Championships
Bronze medal – third place	1989 Moscow	Lightweight

Tonga McClain is an American boxer.

McClain attended Park High School. He was a member of the D'Alie Boxing Club.

McClain competed at the 1989 World Amateur Boxing Championships, winning the bronze medal in the lightweight event.
