= Biagio Chianese =

Italian boxer (born 1961)

Medal record

Representing Italy

Men's Boxing

World Amateur Championships
Bronze medal – third place	1986 Reno	Super Heavyweight

European Amateur Championships
Bronze medal – third place	1987 Turin	Super Heavyweight

Biaggio Chianese (born October 28, 1961, in giugliano (naples)) is a retired boxer from Italy, who won the bronze medal at both the 1986 World Amateur Boxing Championships and the 1987 European Amateur Boxing Championships in the men's heavyweight (+ 91 kg) division.
