= 1986 World Amateur Boxing Championships =

Boxing competitions

1986 AIBA World Boxing Championships
- Venue: Reno-Sparks Convention Center
- Location: Reno, United States
- Start date: May 8, 1986
- End date: May 18, 1986

The Men's 1986 World Amateur Boxing Championships were held in Reno, United States from May 8 to 18. The fourth edition of this competition, held two years before the Summer Olympics in Seoul, South Korea, was organised by the world governing body for amateur boxing AIBA.

== Medal table ==
Rank	Nation	Gold	Silver	Bronze	Total
1	Cuba (CUB)	7	2	2	11
2	United States (USA)	3	1	1	5
3	Soviet Union (URS)	1	0	4	5
4	South Korea (KOR)	1	0	1	2
5	East Germany (GDR)	0	3	2	5
6	Venezuela (VEN)	0	2	0	2
7	Canada (CAN)	0	1	0	1
7	Netherlands (NED)	0	1	0	1
9	Bulgaria (BUL)	0	0	4	4
10	Hungary (HUN)	0	0	2	2
10	Poland (POL)	0	0	2	2
10	Yugoslavia (YUG)	0	0	2	2
13	Brazil (BRA)	0	0	1	1
13	Italy (ITA)	0	0	1	1
13	Sweden (SWE)	0	0	1	1
13	Turkey (TUR)	0	0	1	1
Totals (16 entries)		12	10	24	46

== Medal winners ==
Event	Gold	Silver	Bronze
Light flyweight (48 kg)	Juan Torres Odelin; Cuba	Luis Román Rolón^{1} Puerto Rico	José Rodrigues; Brazil Oh Kwang-soo; South Korea
Flyweight (51 kg)	Pedro Orlando Reyes; Cuba	David Grimán; Venezuela	János Varadi; Hungary Eyüp Can; Turkey
Bantamweight (54 kg)	Moon Sung-kil; South Korea	René Breitbarth; East Germany	Arnaldo Mesa; Cuba Yuri Alexandrov; Soviet Union
Featherweight (57 kg)	Kelcie Banks; United States	Jesus Sollet; Cuba	Andreas Zülow; East Germany Tomasz Nowak; Poland
Lightweight (60 kg)	Adolfo Horta; Cuba	Engels Pedroza; Venezuela	Orzubek Nazarov; Soviet Union Emil Chuprenski; Bulgaria
Light welterweight (63,5 kg)	Vassili Shyshov; Soviet Union	Howard Grant; Canada	(Socialist Federal Republic of Yugoslavia) Mirko Puzović; Yugoslavia Borislav Abadzhiev; Bulgaria
Welterweight (67 kg)	Kenneth Gould; United States	Candelario Duvergel; Cuba	Tibor Molnár; Hungary Torsten Schmitz; East Germany
Light middleweight (71 kg)	Angel Espinosa; Cuba	Enrico Richter; East Germany	Manvel Avetisyan; Soviet Union Lotfi Ayed; Sweden
Middleweight (75 kg)	Darin Allen; United States	Henry Maske; East Germany	Julio Quintana; Cuba Henryk Petrich; Poland
Light heavyweight (81 kg)	Pablo Romero; Cuba	Loren Ross^{1} United States	(Socialist Federal Republic of Yugoslavia) Damir Škaro; Yugoslavia Deyan Kirilov; Bulgaria
Heavyweight (91 kg)	Félix Savón; Cuba	Arnold Vanderlyde; Netherlands	Svilen Rusinov; Bulgaria Michael Bentt; United States
Super heavyweight (+91 kg)	Teófilo Stevenson; Cuba	Alex Garcia; United States	Vyacheslav Yakovlev; Soviet Union Biaggio Chianese; Italy

- Puerto Rican Louis Rolon (48 Kg) and American Lauren Ross (81 Kg) were disqualified for doping violations.
