= Andreas Otto =

German boxer

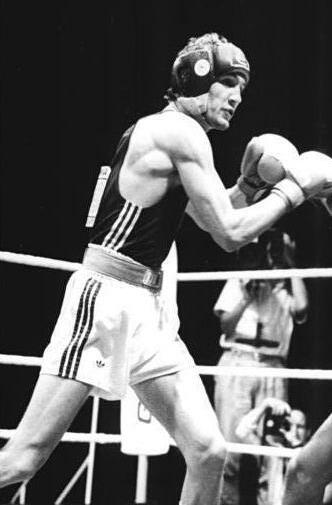
- Otto in 1989

Personal information
- Nationality: German
- Born: 5 October 1963 (age 62) Frankfurt an der Oder, East Germany (now Brandenburg, Germany)

Sport
- Sport: Boxing
Medal record
Men's boxing
Representing Germany
World Championships
Silver medal – second place	1991 Sydney	Welterweight
Bronze medal – third place	1993 Tampere	Welterweight
Bronze medal – third place	1995 Berlin	Welterweight
European Amateur Championships
Bronze medal – third place	1993 Bursa	Welterweight
Representing East Germany
World Championships
Silver medal – second place	1989 Moscow	Light Welterweight
European Amateur Championships
Bronze medal – third place	1989 Athens	Light Welterweight

Andreas Otto (born 5 October 1963) is a German boxer. He competed at the 1988 Summer Olympics for East Germany, and the 1992 Summer Olympics for Germany. At the 1988 Summer Olympics, he lost to Howard Grant of Canada.
