= Chemistry Cup =

German amateur boxing tournament

Tournament information
- Sport: Boxing
- Location: Halle, Germany (1970-2019); Cologne, Germany (2019-)
- Established: 1970

The Chemistry Cup (German: Chemiepokal), now known as the Cologne Boxing World Cup, was established by the German Boxing Federation in 1970 in Halle, Germany. It is Germany's long-running international amateur boxing tournament.

== History ==
The first Chemistry Cup boxing tournament was held in Halle (Saale), Germany, in 1970. Since 1970, the event has crowned champions such as three-time Olympic gold medalist Teófilo Stevenson, Henry Maske, Dariusz Michalczewski, Juan Hernández, Andy Cruz, and Vassiliy Jirov.

In 2005, Gennady Golovkin suffered one of his reported five amateur losses at the German tournament, defeated by Eduard Gutknecht.

The 2012 Chemistry Cup, held from March 14–17, featured U.S. Olympians Errol Spence Jr. and Joseph Diaz, Jr.

The Chemistry Cup became the Cologne Boxing World Cup in 2019. Halle was replaced by Cologne as the host city for the 45th amateur boxing tournament.

== Notable participants ==
- Teofilo Stevenson
- Félix Savón
- Vitali Klitschko
- Wladimir Klitschko
- Gennady Golovkin
- Joseph Diaz, Jr.
- Errol Spence
- Keyshawn Davis

== Gallery ==
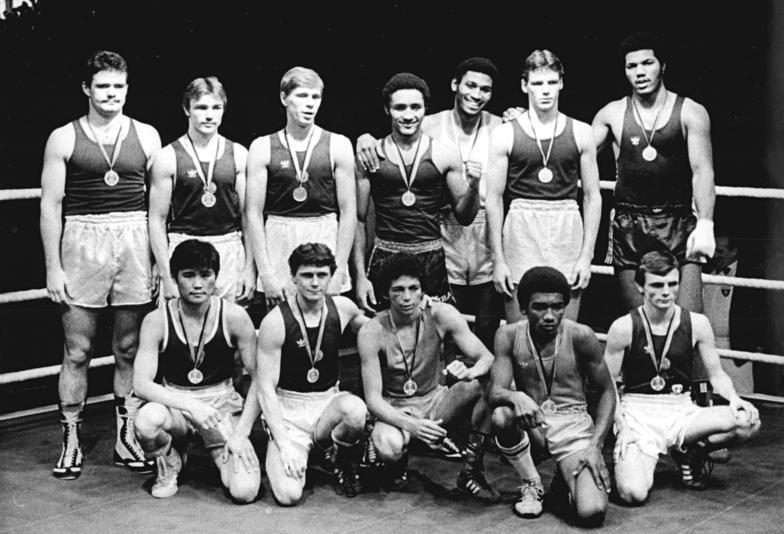
Jorge Guzman, Pablo Romero, and Henry Maske at the awards ceremony of the 1983 Chemistry Cup

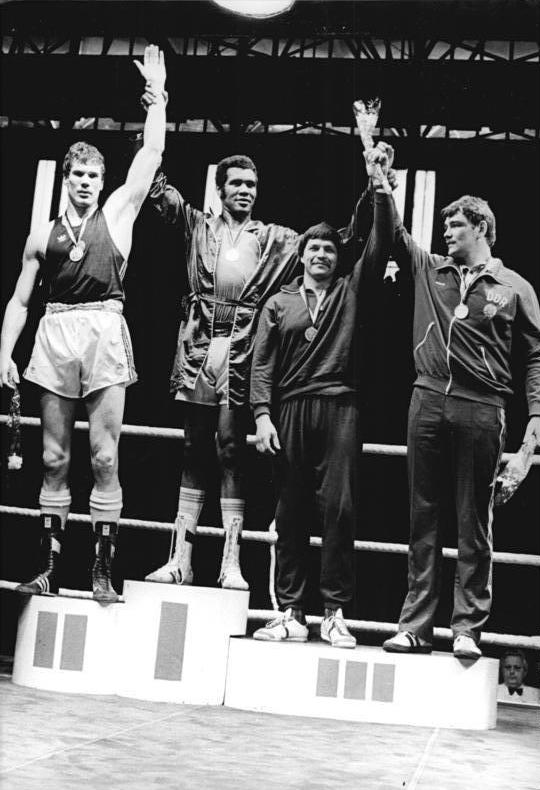
Ulli Kaden, Teófilo Stevenson, Alexander Krasko, and Olaf Walter at the awards ceremony of the 1984 Chemistry Cup

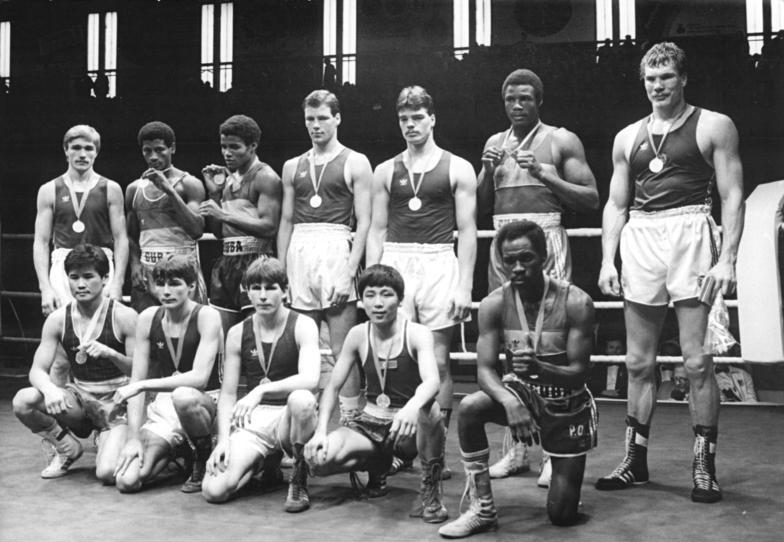
Siegfried Mehnert, Candelario Duvergel, Angel Espinosa, René Suetovius, Henry Maske, and Félix Savón, at the awards ceremony of the 1986 Chemistry Cup

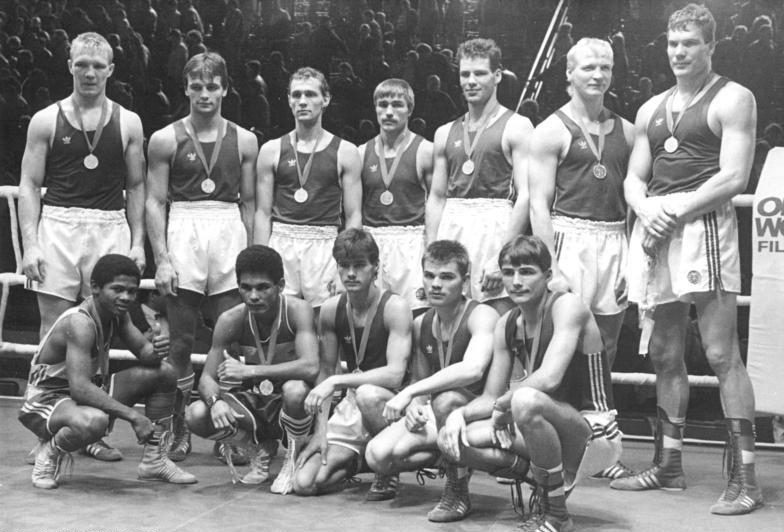
Dieter Berg, Marco Rudolph, and Andreas Zülow at the awards ceremony of the 1989 Chemistry Cup
