= Yuri Alexandrov (boxer) =

Soviet boxer (1963–2013)

Personal information
- Nationality: Russian
- Born: September 13, 1963 Kamensk-Uralsky, Russian SFSR, Soviet Union
- Died: January 2, 2013 (aged 49)
- Weight: Flyweight, Bantamweight

Boxing career
Medal record
Men's Boxing
Representing the Soviet Union
World Amateur Championships
Gold medal – first place	1982 Munich	Flyweight
Bronze medal – third place	1986 Reno	Flyweight
European Amateur Championships
Gold medal – first place	1983 Varna	Bantamweight
Silver medal – second place	1987 Torino	Bantamweight
Friendship Games
Silver medal – second place	1984 Havana	Bantamweight

Yuri Alexandrov (Russian: Ю́рий Васи́льевич Алекса́ндров; September 13, 1963 – January 2, 2013) was a Russian Soviet-era boxer who was World Amateur Flyweight Champion in 1982, and European Amateur Bantamweight Champion in 1983, as well as four-time champion of the USSR (1982, 1984, 1986,1987). He was unable to replicate this success in the Olympics, being excluded from the 1984 Los Angeles games by the Soviet boycott, and missing the 1988 games due to injury.

In 1989 Alexandrov briefly turned professional (the first Soviet boxer to do so), but did not meet with great success and retired in 1992. In 2001 he became vice-president of the Russian Professional Boxing Federation. He held this position until his death, from a heart attack, on 2 January 2013.
