= Francisc Vaștag =

Romanian boxer (born 1969)

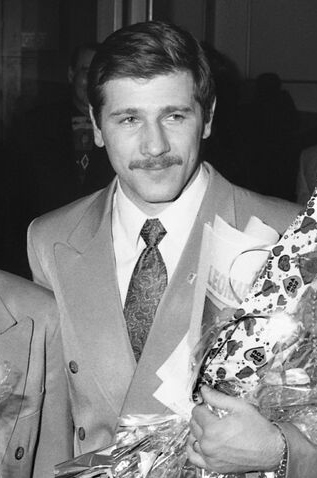
- Vaștag in 1995

Personal information
- Born: 26 November 1969 (age 56) Reșița, Romania
- Height: 176 cm (5 ft 9 in)

Sport
- Sport: Boxing
Medal record
Representing Romania
Romania National Amateur Boxing Championships
Gold medal – first place	1988 Constanța	-67 kg
Gold medal – first place	1989 Bucharest	-67 kg
Gold medal – first place	1990 Brăila	-71 kg
Gold medal – first place	1991 Bucharest	-71 kg
Gold medal – first place	1993 Constanța	-71 kg
Gold medal – first place	1996 Bacău	-75 kg
World Amateur Championships
Gold medal – first place	1989 Moscow	Welterweight
Bronze medal – third place	1991 Sydney	Welterweight
Gold medal – first place	1993 Tampere	Light middleweight
Gold medal – first place	1995 Berlin	Light middleweight
European Amateur Championships
Gold medal – first place	1993 Bursa	Light middleweight
Gold medal – first place	1996 Vejle	Light middleweight

Francisc Vaștag (Romanian pronunciation: [ˈfrant͡ʃisk ˈvaʃtaɡ]; born 26 November 1969) is a retired Romanian amateur boxer, who won three world amateur titles between 1989 and 1995, in the welterweight and light middleweight categories. He competed at the 1988, 1992 and 1996 Olympics reaching quarterfinals in 1992. After retiring from competitions he coached the national boxing team. His son, Andrei Vaștag, is a football player who played for Liga I side FC Dinamo București, among other teams.
