= Boxing at the Friendship Games =

Boxing competitions

Boxing at the Friendship Games took place at the Ciudad Deportiva in Havana, Cuba. The boxing schedule began on 18 August and ended on 24 August 1984. Twelve boxing events (all men's individual) were contested.

Notably, Cuba – the host nation – won 11 out of 12 gold medals.

== Medal table ==
| Event | Gold | Silver | Bronze |
|---|---|---|---|
| Light flyweight (-48 kg) | Juan Torres Odelin (CUB) | Karimzhan Abdrakhmanov (URS) | Janusz Starzyk (POL) |
| Light flyweight (-48 kg) | Juan Torres Odelin (CUB) | Karimzhan Abdrakhmanov (URS) | Dietmar Geilich (GDR) |
| Flyweight (-51 kg) | Pedro Reyes (CUB) | Zbigniew Raubo (POL) | János Váradi (HUN) |
| Flyweight (-51 kg) | Pedro Reyes (CUB) | Zbigniew Raubo (POL) | Ivan Filchev (BUL) |
| Bantamweight (-54 kg) | Ramon Ledon (CUB) | Yuri Alexandrov (URS) | Galin Kolev (BUL) |
| Bantamweight (-54 kg) | Ramon Ledon (CUB) | Yuri Alexandrov (URS) | Klaus-Dieter Kirchstein (GDR) |
| Featherweight (-57 kg) | Adolfo Horta (CUB) | Serik Nurkazov (URS) | Dimitar Slavchev (BUL) |
| Featherweight (-57 kg) | Adolfo Horta (CUB) | Serik Nurkazov (URS) | Jo Ryon-Sik (PRK) |
| Lightweight (-60 kg) | Angel Herrera Vera (CUB) | Nergüin Enkhbat (MGL) | Ramon Gil (VEN) |
| Lightweight (-60 kg) | Angel Herrera Vera (CUB) | Nergüin Enkhbat (MGL) | Ingo Benske (GDR) |
| Light welterweight (-63,5 kg) | Candelario Duvergel (CUB) | Vyacheslav Yanovskiy (URS) | Siegfried Mehnert (GDR) |
| Light welterweight (-63,5 kg) | Candelario Duvergel (CUB) | Vyacheslav Yanovskiy (URS) | Imre Bácskai (HUN) |
| Welterweight (-67 kg) | Torsten Schmitz (GDR) | Jose Hernandez (CUB) | Luis Garcia (VEN) |
| Welterweight (-67 kg) | Torsten Schmitz (GDR) | Jose Hernandez (CUB) | Serik Konakbayev (URS) |
| Light Middleweight (-71 kg) | Angel Espinosa (CUB) | Mikhail Takov (BUL) | Sandor Hranek (HUN) |
| Light Middleweight (-71 kg) | Angel Espinosa (CUB) | Mikhail Takov (BUL) | Michael Timm (GDR) |
| Middleweight (-75 kg) | Bernardo Comas (CUB) | Henryk Petrich (POL) | Ján Franek (TCH) |
| Middleweight (-75 kg) | Bernardo Comas (CUB) | Henryk Petrich (POL) | Zoltán Füzesy (HUN) |
| Light heavyweight (-81 kg) | Pablo Romero (CUB) | Vladimir Shin (URS) | Liu Gol Hen (PRK) |
| Light heavyweight (-81 kg) | Pablo Romero (CUB) | Vladimir Shin (URS) | Milan Picka (TCH) |
| Heavyweight (-91 kg) | Hermenegildo Baez (CUB) | Gyula Alvics (HUN) | Deyan Kirilov (BUL) |
| Heavyweight (-91 kg) | Hermenegildo Baez (CUB) | Gyula Alvics (HUN) | Alexander Yagubkin (URS) |
| Super heavyweight (+91 kg) | Teófilo Stevenson (CUB) | Valery Abadzhyan (URS) | Ulli Kaden (GDR) |
| Super heavyweight (+91 kg) | Teófilo Stevenson (CUB) | Valery Abadzhyan (URS) | Petar Stoimenov (BUL) |

== Medal table ==
* Host nation (Cuba)

| Rank | Nation | Gold | Silver | Bronze | Total |
|---|---|---|---|---|---|
| 1 | Cuba (CUB)* | 11 | 1 | 0 | 12 |
| 2 | East Germany (GDR) | 1 | 0 | 6 | 7 |
| 3 | Soviet Union (URS) | 0 | 6 | 2 | 8 |
| 4 | Poland (POL) | 0 | 2 | 1 | 3 |
| 5 | Bulgaria (BUL) | 0 | 1 | 5 | 6 |
| 6 | Hungary (HUN) | 0 | 1 | 4 | 5 |
| 7 | Mongolia (MGL) | 0 | 1 | 0 | 1 |
| 8 | Czechoslovakia (TCH) | 0 | 0 | 2 | 2 |
| 8 | North Korea (PRK) | 0 | 0 | 2 | 2 |
| 8 | Venezuela (VEN) | 0 | 0 | 2 | 2 |
| Totals (10 entries) | | 12 | 12 | 24 | 48 |

== See also ==
- Boxing at the 1984 Summer Olympics
