= 1991 World Amateur Boxing Championships =

Boxing competitions

1991 AIBA World Boxing Championships
- Location: Sydney, Australia
- Start date: November 15, 1991
- End date: November 23, 1991

The Men's 1991 World Amateur Boxing Championships were held in Sydney, Australia, from November 15 to 23. The sixth edition of this competition, held nearly a year before the Summer Olympics in Barcelona, Spain, was organised by the world's governing body for amateur boxing, AIBA.

== Medal table ==
Rank	Nation	Gold	Silver	Bronze	Total
1	Cuba (CUB)	4	2	3	9
2	Bulgaria (BUL)	2	1	2	5
3	Germany (GER)	2	1	1	4
4	Soviet Union (URS)	1	4	2	7
5	United States (USA)	1	1	1	3
6	Hungary (HUN)	1	0	0	1
6	Italy (ITA)	1	0	0	1
8	North Korea (PRK)	0	1	1	2
8	South Korea (KOR)	0	1	1	2
10	Netherlands (NED)	0	1	0	1
11	Australia (AUS)	0	0	2	2
11	Canada (CAN)	0	0	2	2
11	Romania (ROU)	0	0	2	2
14	Algeria (ALG)	0	0	1	1
14	Egypt (EGY)	0	0	1	1
14	New Zealand (NZL)	0	0	1	1
14	Nigeria (NGR)	0	0	1	1
14	Norway (NOR)	0	0	1	1
14	Puerto Rico (PUR)	0	0	1	1
14	Turkey (TUR)	0	0	1	1
Totals (20 entries)		12	12	24	48

== Medal winners ==
Event	Gold	Silver	Bronze
Light Flyweight (– 48 kilograms)	Eric Griffin; United States	Rogelio Marcelo; Cuba	Nelson Dieppa; Puerto Rico Daniel Petrov; Bulgaria
Flyweight (– 51 kilograms)	István Kovács; Hungary	Choi Chol-Su; North Korea	Hassan Mustafa; Egypt Yuliyan Strogov; Bulgaria
Bantamweight (– 54 kilograms)	Serafim Todorov; Bulgaria	Enrique Carrión; Cuba	Vladislav Antonov; Soviet Union Li Gwang-Sik; North Korea
Featherweight (– 57 kilograms)	Kirkor Kirkorov; Bulgaria	Park Duk-Kyu; South Korea	Hocine Soltani; Algeria Arnaldo Mesa; Cuba
Lightweight (– 60 kilograms)	Marco Rudolph; Germany	Artur Grigoryan; Soviet Union	Justin Rowsell; Australia Vasile Nistor; Romania
Light Welterweight (– 63,5 kilograms)	Konstantin Tszyu; Soviet Union	Vernon Forrest; United States	Moses James; Nigeria Candelario Duvergel; Cuba
Welterweight (– 67 kilograms)	Juan Hernández Sierra; Cuba	Andreas Otto; Germany	Francisc Vaştag; Romania Stefan Scriggins; Australia
Light Middleweight (– 71 kilograms)	Juan Carlos Lemus; Cuba	Israel Akopkokhyan; Soviet Union	Torsten Schmitz; Germany Ole Klemetsen; Norway
Middleweight (– 75 kilograms)	Tommaso Russo; Italy	Aleksandr Lebziak; Soviet Union	Chris Johnson; Canada Ramón Garbey; Cuba
Light Heavyweight (– 81 kilograms)	Torsten May; Germany	Andrey Kurnyavka; Soviet Union	Mehmet Gürgen; Turkey Dale Brown; Canada
Heavyweight (– 91 kilograms)	Félix Savón; Cuba	Arnold Vanderlyde; Netherlands	David Tua; New Zealand Chae Sung-Bae; South Korea
Super Heavyweight (+ 91 kilograms)	Roberto Balado; Cuba	Svilen Rusinov; Bulgaria	Yevgeny Belousov; Soviet Union Larry Donald; United States
