= Darin Allen =

American boxer

Darin Eric Allen (born January 5, 1965, in Columbus, Ohio), a son of David and Sharon Allen. He is a former American amateur and professional boxer.

Darin Allen won the gold medal in the middleweight division at the 1986 World Amateur Boxing Championships, held in Reno, Nevada, by defeating East Germany's Henry Maske in the finals.

== Amateur boxing career notables ==
- 1988 U.S. Olympic Trials Silver Medalist—Middleweight
- 1986 World Amateur Boxing Championships Gold Medalist—Middleweight
- 1985 U.S. Amateur Boxing Federation Champion—Middleweight
- 1984 U.S. Olympic Trials Bronze Medalist—Light Middleweight

== Professional boxing career ==
Allen began boxing in 1975, at the age of ten, and turned professional in 1988. He compiled a record of 23 wins (9 KO's) 3 losses and 1 draw before his retirement in 1997.

On July 19, 1997, Darin Allen fought William Guthrie for the then-vacant IBF World Light Heavyweight title. Guthrie defeated Allen by KO in the third round. Shortly after the title match with Guthrie, the thirty-two-year-old Allen retired from boxing.

== Insight ==
Darin Allen began his boxing career at the age of 10 and was coached by two-time U.S. AAU Boxing Coach of the Year William "Bill" Cummings Jr. In April 1985, Cummings died from an apparent heart attack. The untimely death of his coach along with the inspiration provided by Allen's close friend and teammate, 1984 Olympic Gold Medalist Jerry Page, culminated in motivating Allen to win his first national amateur title in December 1985.
