= 1989 World Amateur Boxing Championships =

Boxing competitions

1989 AIBA World Boxing Championships
- Venue: Olympic Stadium
- Location: Moscow, Soviet Union
- Start date: September 17, 1989
- End date: October 1, 1989

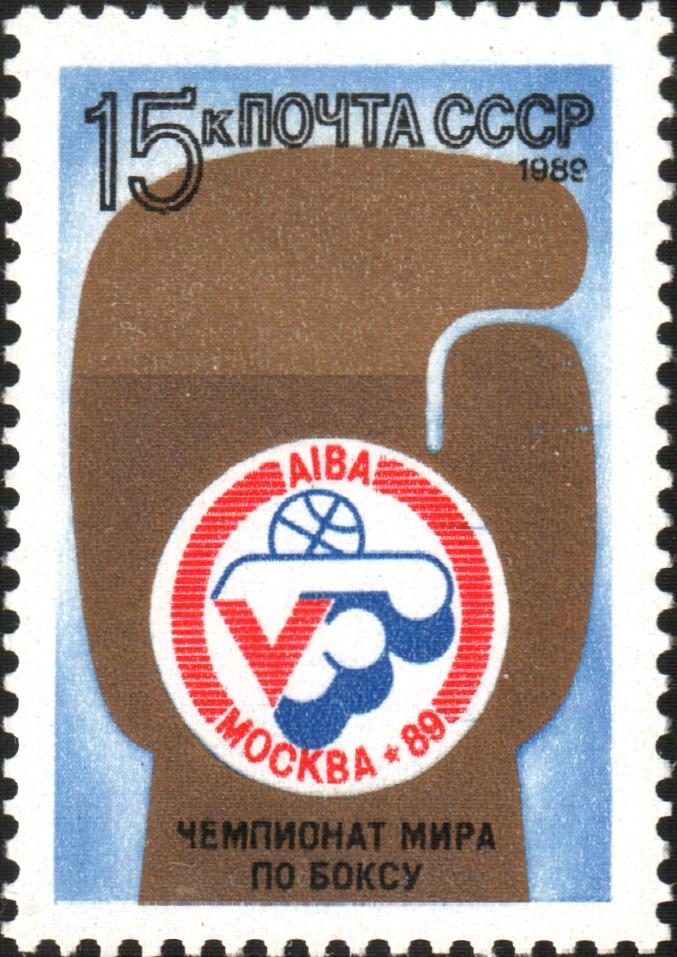
A Soviet stamp dedicated to the 1989 World Amateur Boxing Championships

The Men's 1989 World Amateur Boxing Championships were held in Moscow, Soviet Union from September 17 to October 1, 1989. The fifth edition of this competition, held a year after the Summer Olympics in Seoul, South Korea, was organised by the world governing body for amateur boxing AIBA.

== Medal table ==
| Rank | Nation | Gold | Silver | Bronze | Total |
|---|---|---|---|---|---|
| 1 | Soviet Union (URS) | 5 | 2 | 4 | 11 |
| 2 | Cuba (CUB) | 4 | 4 | 1 | 9 |
| 3 | East Germany (GDR) | 1 | 4 | 2 | 7 |
| 4 | United States (USA) | 1 | 0 | 2 | 3 |
| 5 | Romania (ROU) | 1 | 0 | 1 | 2 |
| 6 | Bulgaria (BUL) | 0 | 2 | 0 | 2 |
| 7 | North Korea (PRK) | 0 | 0 | 3 | 3 |
| 8 | Hungary (HUN) | 0 | 0 | 2 | 2 |
| 8 | West Germany (FRG) | 0 | 0 | 2 | 2 |
| 10 | Australia (AUS) | 0 | 0 | 1 | 1 |
| 10 | Czechoslovakia (TCH) | 0 | 0 | 1 | 1 |
| 10 | Egypt (EGY) | 0 | 0 | 1 | 1 |
| 10 | Ireland (IRL) | 0 | 0 | 1 | 1 |
| 10 | Italy (ITA) | 0 | 0 | 1 | 1 |
| 10 | Poland (POL) | 0 | 0 | 1 | 1 |
| 10 | Yugoslavia (YUG) | 0 | 0 | 1 | 1 |
| Totals (16 entries) | | 12 | 12 | 24 | 48 |

== Medal winners ==
| Event | Gold | Silver | Bronze |
|---|---|---|---|
| Light Flyweight (– 48 kilograms) | Eric Griffin; United States | Rogelio Marcelo; Cuba | Kim Dok-Nam; North Korea Nshan Munchyan; Soviet Union |
| Flyweight (– 51 kilograms) | Yuri Arbachakov; Soviet Union | Pedro Orlando Reyes; Cuba | Li Gwang-Sik; North Korea Krzysztof Wróblewski; Poland |
| Bantamweight (– 54 kilograms) | Enrique Carrión; Cuba | Serafim Todorov; Bulgaria | Li Yong-Ho; North Korea Luigi Quitadamo; Italy |
| Featherweight (– 57 kilograms) | Ayrat Khamatov; Soviet Union | Kirkor Kirkorov; Bulgaria | Arnaldo Mesa; Cuba Jamie Nicolson; Australia |
| Lightweight (– 60 kilograms) | Julio González; Cuba | Andreas Zülow; East Germany | Tonga McClain; United States Konstantin Tszyu; Soviet Union |
| Light Welterweight (– 63,5 kilograms) | Igor Ruzhnikov; Soviet Union | Andreas Otto; East Germany | (Socialist Federal Republic of Yugoslavia) Vukašin Dobrašinović; Yugoslavia (Republic of Ireland) Michael Carruth; Ireland |
| Welterweight (– 67 kilograms) | Francisc Vaştag; Romania | Siegfried Mehnert; East Germany | Raúl Márquez; United States Vladimir Ereshchenko; Soviet Union |
| Light Middleweight (– 71 kilograms) | Israel Akopkokhyan; Soviet Union | Torsten Schmitz; East Germany | Rudel Obreja; Romania Salem Karim Kabbary; Egypt |
| Middleweight (– 75 kilograms) | Andrey Kurnyavka; Soviet Union | Ángel Espinosa; Cuba | Zoltán Fuzesy; Hungary Sven Ottke; West Germany |
| Light Heavyweight (– 81 kilograms) | Henry Maske; East Germany | Pablo Romero; Cuba | Nurmagomed Shanavazov; Soviet Union Sandór Hranek; Hungary |
| Heavyweight (– 91 kilograms) | Félix Savón; Cuba | Evgeni Sudakov; Soviet Union | Axel Schulz; East Germany Bert Teuchert; West Germany |
| Super Heavyweight (> 91 kilograms) | Roberto Balado; Cuba | Aleksandr Miroshnichenko; Soviet Union | Maik Heydeck; East Germany (Czech Republic) Ladislav Husárik; Czechoslovakia |
