= Loren Ross =

Loren "The Boss" Ross (September 18, 1964 – July 31, 2013) in Nashville, Tennessee) is a former professional heavyweight boxer.

== Amateur career ==
Ross won the 1984, 1985, and 1986 United States Amateur Light Heavyweight Championships. This feat was also accomplished by future Heavyweight Champions Cassius Clay known better as Muhammad Ali and Leon Spinks. Spinks, while serving in the United States Marine Corps won three consecutive United States Amateur Light Heavyweight Championships '74, '75 and '76. Lost to Pablo Romero (Cuba) at the World Amateur Championships in 1986 (4–1) for the 178 pound title.

=== 1986 World amateur championships results ===
- Defeated Markus Bott (West Germany) 5–0
- Defeated Nurmagomed Shanavazov (Soviet Union) 5–0
- Defeated Deyan Kirilov (Bulgaria) 3–2
- Lost to Pablo Romero (Cuba) 1–4, in final (placed 2nd)

== Professional career ==
Ross had a professional record of 17–2 (12 KOs) with 1 no contest. Ross won his first 15 fights with 10 of those by KO. Ross' last fight was February 26, 1991 against Bert Cooper. Scheduled for 10 rounds, Cooper scored an 8th-round TKO. Ross was hospitalized after the fight. Ross had to give up boxing because of a heart condition, Cooper went on to fight former Heavyweight Champion Evander Holyfield. In 20 fights, he boxed a total of 79 rounds and had a KO% of 60%.

== Professional boxing record ==
17 Wins (12 knockouts, 5 decisions), 2 Losses (2 knockouts, 0 decisions), 1 No Contest Archived April 4, 2015, at the Wayback Machine
Result	Record	Opponent	Type	Round	Date	Location	Notes
Loss	22-7	(United States) "Smokin" Bert Cooper	TKO	8	26/02/1991	Birmingham, Alabama, United States	
Win	6-23-3	(United States) Robert "Bobby" Thomas	KO	2	08/02/1991	La Vergne, Tennessee, United States	
Win	17-2	(Jamaica) Melton Bowen	TKO	3	20/01/1991	Atlantic City, New Jersey, United States	Referee stopped the bout at 2:42 of the third round.
Loss	18-1	(United States) Tony Willis	TKO	7	08/11/1990	Las Vegas, Nevada, United States	Referee stopped the bout at 0:21 of the seventh round.
Win	--	Lamar Johnson	KO	1	21/08/1990	Raleigh, North Carolina, United States	
Win	12-28-6	(United States) Danny Blake	UD	4	30/07/1990	Chicago, Illinois, United States	
No Contest	2-8-1	(United States) Dave Slaughter	NC	2	15/06/1990	Georgetown, Kentucky, United States	
Win	6-18-1	(United States) Trent Surratt	PTS	6	21/04/1990	Bristol, Tennessee, United States	
Win	16-3-1	(United States) Arthur "Stormy" Weathers	TKO	8	20/03/1990	Nashville, Tennessee, United States	WBA North American Cruiserweight Title.
Win	--	(United States) John Swafford	KO	1	17/02/1990	Bristol, Tennessee, United States	
Win	39-9-3	(United States) Michael Greer	PTS	10	26/12/1989	Memphis, Tennessee, United States	
Win	8-4-1	(United States) Danny Wofford	TKO	3	21/11/1989	Nashville, Tennessee, United States	
Win	4-15-1	(United States) Trent Surratt	UD	8	25/10/1989	Nashville, Tennessee, United States	80-69, 80-70, 80-60.
Win	--	Billy "The Kid" Moore	KO	4	30/09/1989	La Vergne, Tennessee, United States	
Win	--	(United States) Tony "Wooden" Nichols	KO	1	05/09/1989	Memphis, Tennessee, United States	
Win	--	Tony Best	KO	1	31/08/1989	Memphis, Tennessee, United States	
Win	--	Larry "Cable Guy" Anderson	TKO	1	11/07/1989	Memphis, Tennessee, United States	
Win	6-13	(United States) Rocky Bentley	PTS	6	24/06/1989	Memphis, Tennessee, United States	
Win	0-3	(United States) Robert Raglin Strickland	KO	2	22/05/1989	Bowling Green, Kentucky, United States	
Win	2-7	(United States) Arthur Pruitt	TKO	1	16/05/1989	Nashville, Tennessee, United States	
