= Israyel Hakobkokhyan =

Armenian boxer (born 1960)

Personal information
- Nationality: Armenian
- Born: 21 January 1960 (age 66) Yerevan, Armenian SSR, Soviet Union

Sport
- Sport: Boxing
Medal record
Men's Boxing
Representing Soviet Union
World Amateur Championships
Gold medal – first place	1989 Moscow	Light Middleweight
Silver medal – second place	1991 Sydney	Light Middleweight
European Amateur Championships
Gold medal – first place	1985 Budapest	Welterweight
Gold medal – first place	1989 Athens	Light Middleweight
Gold medal – first place	1991 Gothenburg	Light Middleweight

Israyel Hakobkokhyan (born 21 January 1960) is an Armenian boxer. He competed for the Soviet Union in the men's welterweight event at the 1980 Summer Olympics.
