= Juan Torres Odelín =

Cuban former amateur boxer (born 1960)

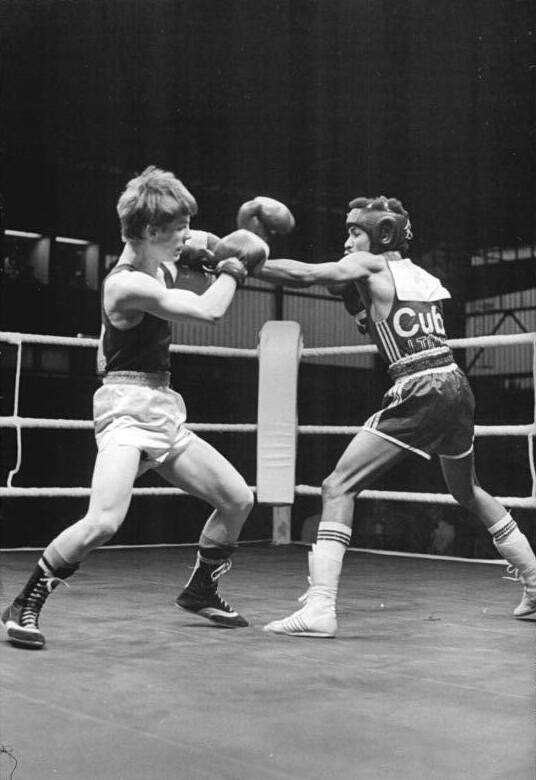
- Torres Odelín (right) in a 1985 bout

Personal information
- Nationality: Cuba
- Born: 12 February 1960 (age 66) Santiago, Cuba

Sport
- Sport: Boxing
- Weight class: Light flyweight
Medal record
Men's amateur boxing
Representing CUB
Friendship Games
Gold medal – first place	1984 Havana	Light flyweight (-48 kg)
World Amateur Championships
Gold medal – first place	1986 Reno	Light flyweight (-48 kg)
Pan American Games
Bronze medal – third place	1987 Indianapolis	Light flyweight (-48 kg)

Juan Torres Odelín (born 12 February 1960) is a Cuban former amateur boxer who competed as a light flyweight and won the World Amateur Championships at Reno in 1986.

A five-time national champion, he was a gold medalist at the Friendship Games and won a bronze medal at the 1987 Pan American Games.
