= Deyan Kirilov =

Bulgarian boxer (born 1964)

Personal information
- Born: June 20, 1964 (age 62) Sofia, Bulgaria
Medal record
Men's boxing
Representing Bulgaria
Friendship Games
| Bronze medal – third place | 1984 Havana | Heavyweight |
World Amateur Championships
| Bronze medal – third place | 1986 Reno | Light Heavyweight |
European Amateur Championships
| Bronze medal – third place | 1985 Budapest | Light Heavyweight |

Deyan Kirilov (Bulgarian: Деян Кирилов; born June 20, 1964, in Sofia) is a retired boxer from Bulgaria, who competed for his native country at the 1988 Summer Olympics in Seoul, South Korea. There he was defeated in the first round of the Men's Light Heavyweight Division (– 81 kg) by Yugoslavia's eventual bronze medalist Damir Škaro.
