= Luis Román Rolón =

Puerto Rican boxer (born 1968)

Luis Rolón
Personal information
- Full name: Luis Román Rolón
- Nationality: Puerto Rican
- Born: July 13, 1968 (age 57) Vega Baja, Puerto Rico

Sport
- Sport: Boxing
- Weight class: Light Flyweight
Medal record
Pan American Games
Gold medal – first place	1987 Indianapolis	Light Flyweight

Luis Román Rolón (born July 13, 1968, in Vega Baja) is a retired boxer from Puerto Rico, who competed in the bantamweight (– 54 kg) division. As an amateur he won the silver medal at the 1986 World Amateur Boxing Championships in Reno. Later he was disqualified after failing a drug test.

After having won the gold medal at the 1987 Pan American Games Rolón represented his native country at the 1988 Summer Olympics in Seoul, South Korea, where he was defeated in the second round of the light flyweight division (– 48 kg). In his professional career he retired in 2000, with a record of nineteen wins (12 ko's), four losses and one draw.

== See also ==
- List of sportspeople sanctioned for doping offences
