= Candelario Duvergel =

Cuban boxer (1963–2016)

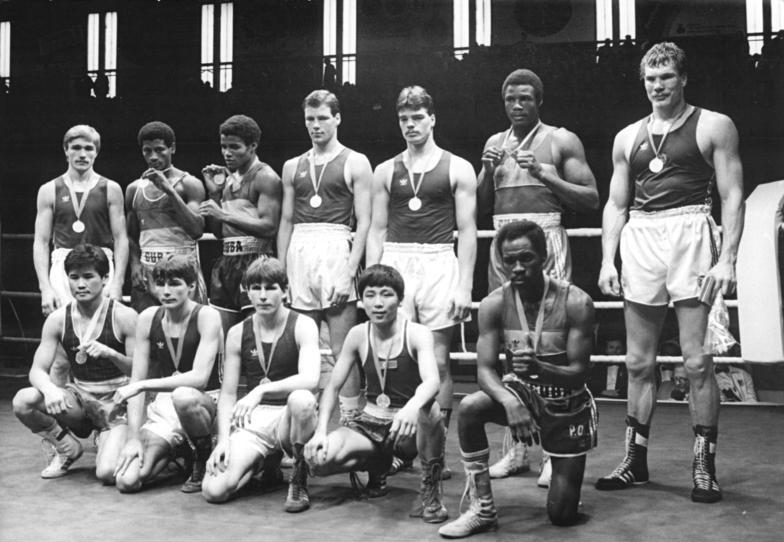
- Left-to-right: Siegfried Mehnert, Candelario Duvergel, and Angel Espinosa at the awards ceremony of the 1986 Chemistry Cup

Personal information
- Nickname: El astro de la riposta
- Born: Candelario Duvergel Odelín; 2 February 1963 Niceto Pérez, Cuba
- Died: 17 June 2016 (aged 54) Havana, Cuba
- Weight: Light welterweight Welterweight

Boxing career
- Stance: Orthodox
Medal record
Men's amateur boxing
Representing Cuba
Friendship Games
Gold medal – first place	1984 Havana	Light welterweight
Pan American Games
Gold medal – first place	1983 Caracas	Light welterweight
Gold medal – first place	1987 Indianapolis	Light welterweight
World Championships
Silver medal – second place	1986 Reno	Welterweight
Bronze medal – third place	1991 Sydney	Light welterweight

Candelario Duvergel (2 February 1963 — 17 June 2016) was an amateur boxer from Cuba. Duvergel is better known for winning 2 consecutive Pan American Games gold medals in the light welterweight division. Duvergel was renowned for his counter-attacking prowess. He won 8 Cuban national championships but he had trouble replicating his success in international competitions, despite regularly defeating other Cuban amateur champions like Juan Carlos Lemus. Duvergel defeated Shane Mosley in 1991. Duvergel never competed in the Olympics, as Cuba boycotted 1984 Summer Olympics and the 1988 Summer Olympics.
