= Pedro Orlando Reyes =

Cuban boxer (1959–2024)

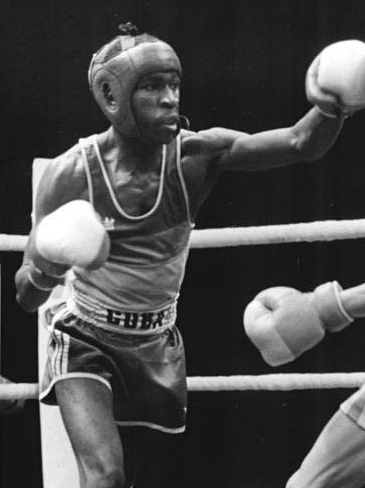
- Reyes in 1988

Personal information
- Born: 23 February 1959 Havana, Cuba
- Died: 26 November 2024 (aged 65)

Sport
- Sport: Boxing
Medal record
Representing Cuba
World championships
Gold medal – first place	1986 Reno	-51 kg
Silver medal – second place	1989 Moscow	-51 kg
Friendship Games
Gold medal – first place	1984 Havana	Flyweight
Pan American Games
Gold medal – first place	1983 Caracas	-51 kg

Pedro Orlando Reyes (23 February 1959 – 26 November 2024) was a Cuban amateur boxer. He won gold medals at the 1983 Pan American Games and 1986 World Championships, placing second in 1989. He could not compete in the 1984 and 1988 Olympics due to their boycott by Cuba. His son Rudy became a baseball player. Reyes died on 26 November 2024, at the age of 65.
