= Enrique Carrión =

Cuban boxer (born 1967)

Enrique Carrion
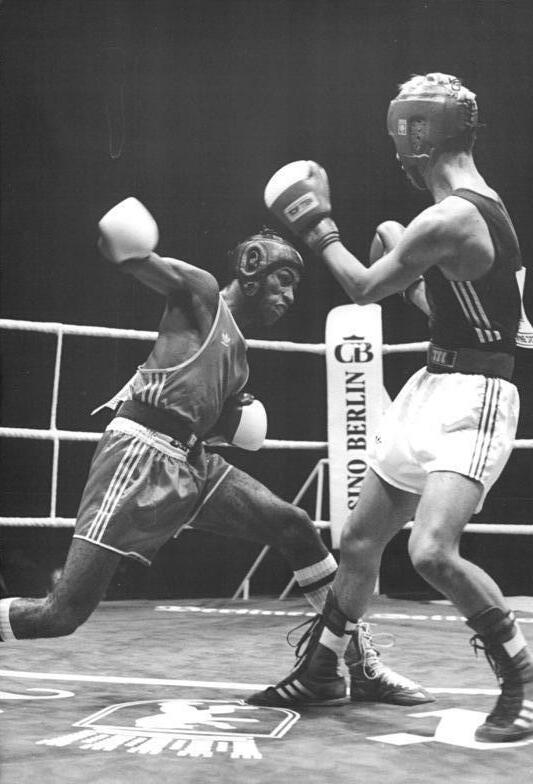
- Enrique Carrion (left) facing Frank Sygmund of Germany in Berlin, 1990

Personal information
- Full name: Enrique Carrion
- Nationality: Cuba

Sport
- Sport: Boxing
- Weight class: Bantamweight
Medal record
World Amateur Championships
Gold medal – first place	1989 Moscow	Bantamweight
Silver medal – second place	1991 Sydney	Bantamweight
Silver medal – second place	1993 Tampere	Featherweight
Central American and Caribbean Games
Gold medal – first place	1993 Ponce	Featherweight
Gold medal – first place	1998 Maracaibo	Featherweight
Goodwill Games
Silver medal – second place	1994 Saint Petersburg	Bantamweight

Enrique Carrión Olivares (Santiago de Cuba, 11 October 1967) is a Cuban amateur boxer best known to win the 1989 World Amateur Boxing Championships at bantamweight.

He won the 1989 final against Bulgarian Serafim Todorov who beat him in 1991 and at featherweight in 1993. He didn't participate in the 1992 Olympics, where his replacement was future professional world champion Joel Casamayor, who secured the gold medal for Cuba.
