= Pablo Romero =

Cuban boxer (born 1961)

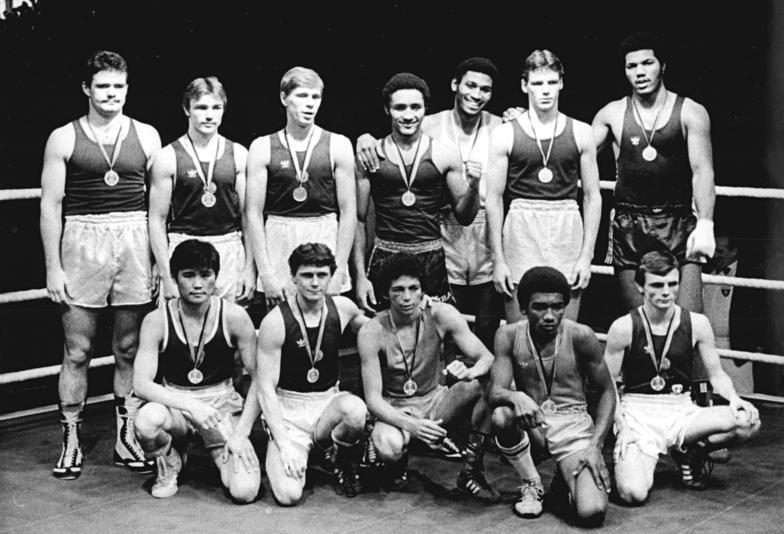
- Jorge Guzman, Pablo Romero, and Henry Maske at the awards ceremony of the 1983 Chemistry Cup

Sport
- Sport: Boxing
Medal record
Men's amateur boxing
Representing Cuba
Friendship Games
Gold medal – first place	1984 Havana	Light Heavyweight
World Championships
Gold medal – first place	1982 Munich	Light Heavyweight
Gold medal – first place	1986 Reno	Light Heavyweight
Silver medal – second place	1989 Moscow	Light Heavyweight
Pan American Games
Gold medal – first place	1983 Caracas	Light Heavyweight
Gold medal – first place	1987 Indianapolis	Light Heavyweight

Pablo Romero (January 15, 1961) is a retired Cuban amateur boxer best known for winning two light-heavyweight gold medals at World Championships. The dominant light heavyweight boxer of the eighties he never participated in Olympics as his country boycotted both the 1984 and 1988 games. He was a tall swarmer, preferring to fight at close quarters. Although Romero possessed a good punching power, none of his 7 victories at the 1982 and 1986 World Championships has come inside the limit.

== Career ==
At the 1982 World Amateur Boxing Championships he won his first title.

He won the PanAm Games 1983 in Caracas beating Evander Holyfield in the finals.

At the 1986 World Amateur Boxing Championships he once again finished first.

He won the PanAm Games in 1987 in Indianiapolis. At the semis he was outboxed on the inside by future Olympic gold medalist Andrew Maynard but knocked Maynard down who quit with a twisted ankle.

Cuba boycotted the Olympics in 1984 and 1988.

At the 1989 World Amateur Boxing Championships he won all three preliminary fights inside the limit, but in the final was outpointed by the reigning Olympic middleweight champion Henry Maske, a tall, slicky southpaw from East Germany and settled for silver.
