= IBA World Boxing Championships =

IBA World Boxing Championships may refer to:

- IBA Men's World Boxing Championships
- IBA Women's World Boxing Championships
