= 2025 World Boxing Championships – Men's 80 kg =

Competition at amateur boxing tournament

Men's 80 kg at the 2025 World Boxing Championships
- Venue: Liverpool Arena
- Location: Liverpool, England
- Dates: 4–14 September
- Competitors: 36 from 36 nations

Medalists
gold medal	Javokhir Ummataliev	Uzbekistan
silver medal	Yojerlin César	France
bronze medal	Gabrijel Veočić	Croatia
bronze medal	Pylyp Akilov	Hungary

The Men's 80 kg competition at the 2025 World Boxing Championships was held from 4 to 14 September 2025.

== Results ==
=== Finals ===
Semifinals; 13 September
Javokhir Ummataliev (UZB)	5
Gabrijel Veočić (CRO)	0
Pylyp Akilov (HUN)	0
Yojerlin César (FRA)	5

Final; 14 September
Javokhir Ummataliev (UZB)	5
Yojerlin César (FRA)	0

=== Top half ===
==== Section 1 ====
Preliminaries; 4 September
Matvii Razhba (UKR)	RSC
Ben Ehis (GER)

Round of 32; 7 September
Nurbek Oralbay (KAZ)	5
Matvii Razhba (UKR)	0
Tuohetaerbieke Tanglatihan (CHN)	4
Emiliano Reducindo (MEX)	1
Kim Min-seong (KOR)	5
Jolando Taala (SAM)	0
Nikodem Kozak (POL)	0
Javokhir Ummataliev (UZB)	5

Round of 16; 9 September
Nurbek Oralbay (KAZ)	5
Tuohetaerbieke Tanglatihan (CHN)	0
Kim Min-seong (KOR)	0
Javokhir Ummataliev (UZB)	5

Quarter-finals; 10 September
Nurbek Oralbay (KAZ)	0
Javokhir Ummataliev (UZB)	5

==== Section 2 ====
Preliminaries; 4 September
Noel Pacheco (DOM)	3
Kelyn Cassidy (IRL)	2

Round of 32; 7 September
Go Wakaya (JPN)	0
William Cholov (BUL)	5
Taj Kagho (NZL)
Aminiasi Saratibau (FIJ)	DSQ
Robby Gonzales (USA)	3
Jorge Soto (CUB)	2
Noel Pacheco (DOM)	1
Gabrijel Veočić (CRO)	4

Round of 16; 9 September
William Cholov (BUL)	4
Aminiasi Saratibau (FIJ)	1
Robby Gonzales (USA)	1
Gabrijel Veočić (CRO)	4

Quarter-finals; 10 September
William Cholov (BUL)	0
Gabrijel Veočić (CRO)	5

=== Bottom half ===
==== Section 3 ====
Preliminaries; 4 September
Amar Koci (ALB)	3
Meysam Gheshlaghi (IRI)	2

Round of 32; 7 September
Murad Allahverdiyev (AZE)	4
Amar Koci (ALB)	1
Pylyp Akilov (HUN)	5
Diego Pereyra (VEN)	0
Nickenson Denis (CAN)	5
Oussama El-Moussaoui (BEL)	0
Adam Hájek (CZE)	0
Oladimeji Shittu (ENG)	5

Round of 16; 9 September
Murad Allahverdiyev (AZE)	0
Pylyp Akilov (HUN)	5
Nickenson Denis (CAN)	0
Oladimeji Shittu (ENG)	5

Quarter-finals; 10 September
Pylyp Akilov (HUN)	4
Oladimeji Shittu (ENG)	1

==== Section 4 ====
Preliminaries; 4 September
Kaan Aykutsun (TUR)	1
Omurbek Bekzhigit Uulu (KGZ)	4

Round of 32; 7 September
Yojerlin César (FRA)	5
Lucky Osaro Aimufua (AUT)	0
Lakshya Chahar (IND)	5
Hussein Ishaish (JOR)	0
Silas Yde (DEN)
Marlon Sevehon (AUS)	RSC
Omurbek Bekzhigit Uulu (KGZ)	0
Wanderley Pereira (BRA)	5

Round of 16; 9 September
Yojerlin César (FRA)	3
Lakshya Chahar (IND)	0
Marlon Sevehon (AUS)	0
Wanderley Pereira (BRA)	5

Quarter-finals; 10 September
Yojerlin César (FRA)	5
Wanderley Pereira (BRA)	0
