= 2023 IBA World Boxing Championships – Middleweight =

Middleweight at the 2023 IBA World Boxing Championships
- Venue: Humo Arena
- Location: Tashkent, Uzbekistan
- Dates: 2–14 May
- Competitors: 37 from 37 nations

Medalists
gold medal	Yoenlis Hernández	Cuba
silver medal	Wanderley Pereira	Brazil
bronze medal	Alokhon Abdullaev	Uzbekistan
bronze medal	Moreno Fendero	France

The Middleweight competition at the 2023 IBA Men's World Boxing Championships was held between 2 and 14 May 2023.

== Results ==
=== Finals ===
Semifinals
(Uzbekistan) Alokhon Abdullaev	1
(Brazil) Wanderley Pereira	4
(France) Moreno Fendero	0
(Cuba) Yoenlis Hernández	5

Final
(Brazil) Wanderley Pereira	0
(Cuba) Yoenlis Hernández	5

=== Top half ===
==== Section 1 ====
Round of 64
(Azerbaijan) Mirsharif Kazimzade	4
(Kenya) Edwin Okong'o	1

Round of 32
(Italy) Salvatore Cavallaro	KO
(Azerbaijan) Mirsharif Kazimzade
(Hungary) Pylyp Akilov	5
(Georgia (country)) Giorgi Kharabadze	0
(China) Zhao Mengyang	0
(Uzbekistan) Alokhon Abdullaev	5
(Kyrgyzstan) Daniyar Damirdin Uulu	0
(Serbia) Almir Memić	5

Round of 16
(Italy) Salvatore Cavallaro	0
(Hungary) Pylyp Akilov	5
(Uzbekistan) Alokhon Abdullaev	4
(Serbia) Almir Memić	0

Quarterfinals
(Hungary) Pylyp Akilov	0
(Uzbekistan) Alokhon Abdullaev	5

==== Section 2 ====
Round of 64
(Turkey) Sultan Osmanlı	5
(Israel) Daniel Ilyushonok	0
(Austria) Marcel Meinl	3
(Dominican Republic) Virgilio de los Santos	4

Round of 32
(Iran) Shahin Mousavi	5
(Turkey) Sultan Osmanlı	0
(Australia) Callum Peters	5
(Moldova) Vasile Cebotari	0
(United Arab Emirates) Fahad Al-Khoori
(Brazil) Wanderley Pereira	RSC
(Dominican Republic) Virgilio de los Santos	0
(Kazakhstan) Nurkanat Raiys	5

Round of 16
(Iran) Shahin Mousavi	0
(Australia) Callum Peters	5
(Brazil) Wanderley Pereira	5
(Kazakhstan) Nurkanat Raiys	0

Quarterfinals
(Australia) Callum Peters	3
(Brazil) Wanderley Pereira	4

=== Bottom half ===
==== Section 3 ====
Round of 64
(Comoros) Mohamed Mdahoma
(Tajikistan) Nekruz Salimov	KO

Round of 32
(Democratic Republic of the Congo) David Tshama
(Tajikistan) Nekruz Salimov	w/o
(Cameroon) Kadafi Nsangou	1
(Albania) Arjon Kajoshi	4
(France) Moreno Fendero	4
(Sweden) Adam Belalia	3
(India) Sumit Kundu	1
(Russia) Pavel Sosulin	3

Round of 16
(Tajikistan) Nekruz Salimov	5
(Albania) Arjon Kajoshi	0
(France) Moreno Fendero	4
(Russia) Pavel Sosulin	3

Quarterfinals
(Tajikistan) Nekruz Salimov	1
(France) Moreno Fendero	4

==== Section 4 ====
Round of 64
(South Korea) Kim Soo-chan	1
(Jordan) Mohammad Al-Mharat	4

Round of 32
(Bulgaria) Rami Kiwan	5
(Turkmenistan) Muhammet Babaýew	0
(Chinese Taipei) Lin Chia-hsin	0
(Syria) Ahmad Ghosson	5
(Mongolia) Jargalyn Otgonjargal	5
(Senegal) Alphonse Mendy	0
(Jordan) Mohammad Al-Mharat	0
(Cuba) Yoenlis Hernández	5

Round of 16
(Bulgaria) Rami Kiwan	5
(Syria) Ahmad Ghosson	0
(Mongolia) Jargalyn Otgonjargal	0
(Cuba) Yoenlis Hernández	5

Quarterfinals
(Bulgaria) Rami Kiwan	0
(Cuba) Yoenlis Hernández	5
