= 2023 IBA World Boxing Championships – Light heavyweight =

Light heavyweight at the 2023 IBA World Boxing Championships
- Venue: Humo Arena
- Location: Tashkent, Uzbekistan
- Dates: 2–14 May
- Competitors: 44 from 44 nations

Medalists
| gold medal | Nurbek Oralbay | Kazakhstan |
| silver medal | Tuohetaerbieke Tanglatihan | China |
| bronze medal | Gazimagomed Jalidov | Spain |
| bronze medal | Imam Khataev | Russia |

The Light heavyweight competition at the 2023 IBA Men's World Boxing Championships was held between 2 and 14 May 2023.

== Results ==
=== Finals ===
Semifinals
(China) Tuohetaerbieke Tanglatihan | 5
(Spain) Gazimagomed Jalidov | 2
(Russia) Imam Khataev | 1
(Kazakhstan) Nurbek Oralbay | 4

Final
(China) Tuohetaerbieke Tanglatihan | 1
(Kazakhstan) Nurbek Oralbay | 4

=== Top half ===
==== Section 1 ====
Round of 64
(Iran) Meysam Gheshlaghi | 1
(India) Ashish Kumar Chaudhary | 4
(France) Mathieu Bauderlique | 5
(Senegal) Seydina Mouhamed Konaté | 0
(China) Tuohetaerbieke Tanglatihan | 5
(Armenia) Hambardzum Hakobyan | 0

Round of 32
(Cuba) Arlen López | 5
(India) Ashish Kumar Chaudhary | 2
(Hungary) Pál Kovács | 4
(Kenya) Robert Okaka | 1
(Egypt) Abdelrahman Oraby | 4
(France) Mathieu Bauderlique | 0
(China) Tuohetaerbieke Tanglatihan | RSC
(Morocco) Mohamed Assaghir

Round of 16
(Cuba) Arlen López | 5
(Hungary) Pál Kovács | 0
(Egypt) Abdelrahman Oraby
(China) Tuohetaerbieke Tanglatihan | KO

Quarterfinals
(Cuba) Arlen López | 3
(China) Tuohetaerbieke Tanglatihan | 4

==== Section 2 ====
Round of 64
(Haiti) Leclerc Nogaus | 0
(Greece) Michail Tsamalidis | 5
(Moldova) Andrei Chiriacov | 0
(Croatia) Gabrijel Veočić | 5
(Romania) Andrei Arădoaie | 2
(Mexico) Héctor Aguirre | 5

Round of 32
(Kyrgyzstan) Omurbek Bekzhigit Uulu | 5
(Greece) Michail Tsamalidis | 0
(Croatia) Gabrijel Veočić | 5
(Jamaica) Jerome Ennis | 0
(Guyana) Desmond Amsterdam | 4
(Bulgaria) Kristiyan Nikolov | 3
(Mexico) Héctor Aguirre | 1
(Spain) Gazimagomed Jalidov | 4

Round of 16
(Kyrgyzstan) Omurbek Bekzhigit Uulu
(Croatia) Gabrijel Veočić | DSQ
(Guyana) Desmond Amsterdam | 0
(Spain) Gazimagomed Jalidov | 5

Quarterfinals
(Croatia) Gabrijel Veočić
(Spain) Gazimagomed Jalidov | KO

=== Bottom half ===
==== Section 3 ====
Round of 64
(Paraguay) Lino Ruiz | 0
(North Macedonia) Arjan Iseni | 5
(Serbia) Artem Ageev | 5
(Cameroon) Junior Fotouo | 0
(Georgia (country)) Otar Naveriani | 5
(Tanzania) Yusuf Changalawe | 0

Round of 32
(Russia) Imam Khataev | 5
(North Macedonia) Arjan Iseni | 0
(South Korea) Kim Jin-jea | 0
(Dominican Republic) Cristian Pinales | 4
(Australia) Kirra Ruston | 5
(Serbia) Artem Ageev | 0
(Georgia (country)) Otar Naveriani | 0
(Belarus) Aliaksei Alfiorau | 5

Round of 16
(Russia) Imam Khataev | 3
(Dominican Republic) Cristian Pinales | 0
(Australia) Kirra Ruston | 0
(Belarus) Aliaksei Alfiorau | 5

Quarterfinals
(Russia) Imam Khataev | 4
(Belarus) Aliaksei Alfiorau | 1

==== Section 4 ====
Round of 64
(Azerbaijan) Murad Allahverdiyev | 4
(Tajikistan) Shabbos Negmatulloev | 1
(Japan) Issei Aramoto | 0
(Turkey) Kaan Aykutsun | 5
(Uzbekistan) Jasurbek Yuldoshev | 5
(Algeria) Younes Nemouchi | 0

Round of 32
(Kazakhstan) Nurbek Oralbay | 5
(Azerbaijan) Murad Allahverdiyev | 0
(Turkey) Kaan Aykutsun | 5
(Guatemala) Wyatt Trujillo | 0
(Trinidad and Tobago) Nickell Joseph
(Democratic Republic of the Congo) Pita Kabeji | RSC
(Uzbekistan) Jasurbek Yuldoshev | 3
(Jordan) Hussein Ishaish | 4

Round of 16
(Kazakhstan) Nurbek Oralbay | 5
(Turkey) Kaan Aykutsun | 0
(Democratic Republic of the Congo) Pita Kabeji | 0
(Jordan) Hussein Ishaish | 5

Quarterfinals
(Kazakhstan) Nurbek Oralbay | 5
(Jordan) Hussein Ishaish | 0
