= 2025 World Boxing Championships – Men's 75 kg =

Competition at amateur boxing tournament

Men's 75 kg at the 2025 World Boxing Championships
- Venue: Liverpool Arena
- Location: Liverpool, England
- Dates: 5–13 September
- Competitors: 24 from 24 nations

Medalists
gold medal	Fazliddin Erkinboev	Uzbekistan
silver medal	Rami Kiwan	Bulgaria
bronze medal	Callum Makin	England
bronze medal	Saidjamshid Jafarov	Azerbaijan

The Men's 75 kg competition at the 2025 World Boxing Championships was held from 5 to 13 September 2025.

== Results ==
=== Final ===
Final; 13 September
Rami Kiwan (BUL)	0
Fazliddin Erkinboev (UZB)	5

=== Top half ===
Preliminaries; 5 September
Sumit Kundu (IND)	5
Mohammad Alhussien (JOR)	0
Soma Mester (HUN)
Alan Perrie (SCO)	DSQ
Callum Peters (AUS)	0
Joshua Ofori (CAN)	5
Petar Krešimir Knežević (CRO)	0
Callum Makin (ENG)	5

Round of 16; 8 September
Rami Kiwan (BUL)	5
Sumit Kundu (IND)	0
Alan Perrie (SCO)	4
Senad Drini (ALB)	1
Nuradin Rustambek Uulu (KGZ)
Joshua Ofori (CAN)	RSC
Callum Makin (ENG)	3
Michal Jarlinski (POL)	2

Quarter-finals; 10 September
Rami Kiwan (BUL)	5
Alan Perrie (SCO)	0
Joshua Ofori (CAN)	1
Callum Makin (ENG)	4

Semi-finals; 12 September
Rami Kiwan (BUL)	5
Callum Makin (ENG)	0

=== Bottom half ===
Preliminaries; 5 September
Giacomo Salvati (ITA)	0
Sultan Osmanlı (TUR)	5
Giorgi Natroshvili (GEO)	5
Marcel Meinl (AUT)	0
Gavin Rafferty (IRL)	0
Saidjamshid Jafarov (AZE)	5
Pavlo Illiusha (UKR)	3
Mohammad Nourani (IRI)	2

Round of 16; 8 September
Fazliddin Erkinboev (UZB)	5
Sultan Osmanlı (TUR)	0
Giorgi Natroshvili (GEO)	0
Hamza Sriri (BEL)	5
Daigo Sunaga (JPN)	0
Saidjamshid Jafarov (AZE)	5
Pavlo Illiusha (UKR)	3
Sabirzhan Akkalykov (KAZ)	2

Quarter-finals; 10 September
Fazliddin Erkinboev (UZB)	5
Hamza Sriri (BEL)	0
Saidjamshid Jafarov (AZE)	5
Pavlo Illiusha (UKR)	0

Semi-finals; 12 September
Fazliddin Erkinboev (UZB)	4
Saidjamshid Jafarov (AZE)	1
