= 2021 AIBA World Boxing Championships – Middleweight =

Middleweight at the 2021 AIBA World Boxing Championships
- Venue: Štark Arena
- Location: Belgrade, Serbia
- Dates: 26 October – 5 November
- Competitors: 46 from 46 nations

Medalists
gold medal	Yoenlis Hernández	Cuba
silver medal	Dzhambulat Bizhamov
bronze medal	Salvatore Cavallaro	Italy
bronze medal	Weerapon Jongjoho

The Middleweight competition at the 2021 AIBA World Boxing Championships was held between 26 October and 5 November.

== Results ==
=== Finals ===
Semifinals
(Italy) Salvatore Cavallaro	0
(Cuba) Yoenlis Hernández	5
Dzhambulat Bizhamov	RSC
Weerapon Jongjoho

Final
(Cuba) Yoenlis Hernández	4
Dzhambulat Bizhamov	1

=== Top half ===
==== Section 1 ====
First round
(Montenegro) Stefan Savković	0
(Kazakhstan) Nurkanat Raiys	5
(Italy) Salvatore Cavallaro	5
(Finland) Anton Embulajev	0
(Cyprus) Andreas Kokkinos	3
(Slovenia) Marko Makovec	1

Second round
(Moldova) Vlad Gavriliuc	1
(Kazakhstan) Nurkanat Raiys	4
(Kenya) Edwin Okong'o	1
Suliman Aslami	3
(Belarus) Kiryl Samadurau	0
(Italy) Salvatore Cavallaro	5
(Cyprus) Andreas Kokkinos
(France) Moreno Fendero	KO

Third round
(Kazakhstan) Nurkanat Raiys	5
Suliman Aslami	0
(Italy) Salvatore Cavallaro	5
(France) Moreno Fendero	0

Quarterfinals
(Kazakhstan) Nurkanat Raiys	2
(Italy) Salvatore Cavallaro	3

==== Section 2 ====
First round
(India) Sumit	5
(Jamaica) Damon O'Neill	0
(Brazil) Wanderley Pereira	0
(Cuba) Yoenlis Hernández	5
(Spain) Pablo Coy	0
(Bulgaria) Rami Kiwan	5
(Mexico) Héctor Aguirre	1
(Croatia) Gabrijel Veočić	4

Second round
(Tajikistan) Abdumalik Boltaev	0
(India) Sumit	5
(Cuba) Yoenlis Hernández	5
(Turkey) Birol Aygün	0
(Scotland) Sam Hickey	3
(Bulgaria) Rami Kiwan	2
(Croatia) Gabrijel Veočić	5
(Bosnia and Herzegovina) Leo Cvitanović	0

Third round
(India) Sumit	0
(Cuba) Yoenlis Hernández	5
(Scotland) Sam Hickey	1
(Croatia) Gabrijel Veočić	4

Quarterfinals
(Cuba) Yoenlis Hernández	5
(Croatia) Gabrijel Veočić	0

=== Bottom half ===
==== Section 3 ====
First round
(Georgia (country)) Giorgi Kharabadze	4
(Chinese Taipei) Kan Chia-wei	1
(Lithuania) Vytautas Balsys
(Colombia) Diego Motoa	RSC
(England) Lewis Richardson	1
(Serbia) Almir Memić	4
(Kyrgyzstan) Zharkynbek Turatov	0
(Iran) Shahin Mousavi	5

Second round
Dzhambulat Bizhamov	5
(Georgia (country)) Giorgi Kharabadze	0
(Colombia) Diego Motoa	RSC
(Sierra Leone) Ansa Coker
(Germany) Kevin Schumann	4
(Serbia) Almir Memić	1
(Iran) Shahin Mousavi	4
(Guyana) Desmond Amsterdam	0

Third round
Dzhambulat Bizhamov	5
(Colombia) Diego Motoa	0
(Germany) Kevin Schumann	5
(Iran) Shahin Mousavi	0

Quarterfinals
Dzhambulat Bizhamov	5
(Germany) Kevin Schumann	0

==== Section 4 ====
First round
(Trinidad and Tobago) Aaron Prince	1
(Hungary) Soma Mester	4
(Uzbekistan) Saidjamshid Jafarov	5
(Slovakia) Lukáš Ferneza	0
(Norway) Mindaugas Gedminas	4
(Ecuador) Héctor Vera	1

Second round
(Azerbaijan) Mirsharif Kazimzade	5
(Hungary) Soma Mester	0
(Uzbekistan) Saidjamshid Jafarov	5
(Japan) Yuito Moriwaki	0
Weerapon Jongjoho	5
(United States) Jordan Panthen	0
(Norway) Mindaugas Gedminas	2
(Ukraine) Ivan Papakin	3

Third round
(Azerbaijan) Mirsharif Kazimzade	0
(Uzbekistan) Saidjamshid Jafarov	5
Weerapon Jongjoho	5
(Ukraine) Ivan Papakin	0

Quarterfinals
(Uzbekistan) Saidjamshid Jafarov	2
Weerapon Jongjoho	3
