= Callum Makin =

English boxer (born 2003)

Personal information
- Born: 28 October 2003 (age 22) Liverpool, Merseyside, England

Sport
- Sport: Boxing
- Weight class: Middleweight, Light-middleweight
- Club: Rotunda ABC
Medal record
Men's amateur boxing
Representing England
World Boxing Championships
Bronze medal – third place	2025 Liverpool	75 kg
European Boxing Championships
Bronze medal – third place	2026 Sofia	75 kg

Callum Makin (born 28 October 2003) is an English amateur boxer. He won a bronze medal in the 75 kg division at the 2025 World Boxing Championships.

== Career ==
A southpaw, Makin won the under 71 kg title at the England Boxing Elite Championships in 2023 and 2024.

Having been a member of the GB Boxing academy group, he was elevated onto the Podium Squad shortly before being chosen to represent England in the 75 kg division at the 2025 World Boxing Championships in his hometown of Liverpool. In his opening bout at the event, he defeated Croatia's Petar Krešimir Knežević via unanimous decision. Makin then beat Michal Jarlinski from Poland by 3:2 split decision in the round-of-16 and Joshua Ofori of Canada 4:1 in the quarter-finals. He lost to Bulgaria's reigning European champion, Rami Kiwan, via unanimous decision in the semi-finals and was therefore awarded a bronze medal.

At the 2026 European Championships in Sofia, Bulgaria, Makin won a bronze medal in the 75 kg division, defeating Marian Alexandru Buleu of Romania by unanimous decision in his first bout and Armenia's Marat Mikaelyan 3:2 in the quarter-finals, before losing 4:1 to Saidjamshid Jafarov from Azerbaijan in the semi-finals.
