= Boxing at the 2026 Asian Games – Men's 80 kg =

Boxing competitions

Men's 80 kg at the 2026 Asian Games
- Venue: Nishio City Gymnasium
- Date: 23 September – 2 October 2026
- Competitors: 15 from 15 nations

Medalists
gold medal	Ankush Panghal	India
silver medal	Kim Min-seong	South Korea
bronze medal	Fazliddin Erkinboev	Uzbekistan
bronze medal	Hussein Ishaish	Jordan

The men's 80 kilograms event at the 2026 Asian Games took place from 23 September to 2 October 2026 at the Nishio City Gymnasium, Nishio, Aichi Prefecture, Japan.

Ankush Panghal from India won the gold medal.

== Schedule ==
All times are Japan Standard Time (UTC+09:00)

Date	Time	Event
Wednesday, 23 September 2026	13:30	Round of 16
Sunday, 27 September 2026	13:00	Quarterfinals
Tuesday, 29 September 2026	14:30	Semifinals
Friday, 2 October 2026	18:15	Final

== Results ==
Legend

- RSCI — Won by referee stop contest injury

Round of 16
Anvar Nasredinov (CAM)	1
Mohammed Usaith Yazmin (SRI)	4
Ankush Panghal (IND)	5
Hamsa Vogel (BRN)	0
Abdyrahman Yklymow (TKM)	0
Nekruz Salimov (TJK)	5
Kim Min-seong (KOR)	3
Sabirzhan Akkalykov (KAZ)	2
Kai Toriyabe (JPN)	0
Maikhel Roberrd Muskita (INA)	5
Wang Xiaobao (CHN)	5
Weerapon Jongjoho (THA)	0
Omurbek Bekzhigit Uulu (KGZ)	0
Hussein Ishaish (JOR)	3

Quarterfinals
Fazliddin Erkinboev (UZB)	RSCI
Mohammed Usaith Yazmin (SRI)
Ankush Panghal (IND)	5
Nekruz Salimov (TJK)	0
Kim Min-seong (KOR)	4
Maikhel Roberrd Muskita (INA)	1
Wang Xiaobao (CHN)	1
Hussein Ishaish (JOR)	3

Semifinals
Fazliddin Erkinboev (UZB)	1
Ankush Panghal (IND)	4
Kim Min-seong (KOR)	5
Hussein Ishaish (JOR)	0

Final
Ankush Panghal (IND)	4
Kim Min-seong (KOR)	0
