= Boxing at the 2023 European Games – Men's light heavyweight =

Men's light heavyweight boxing at the 2023 European Games
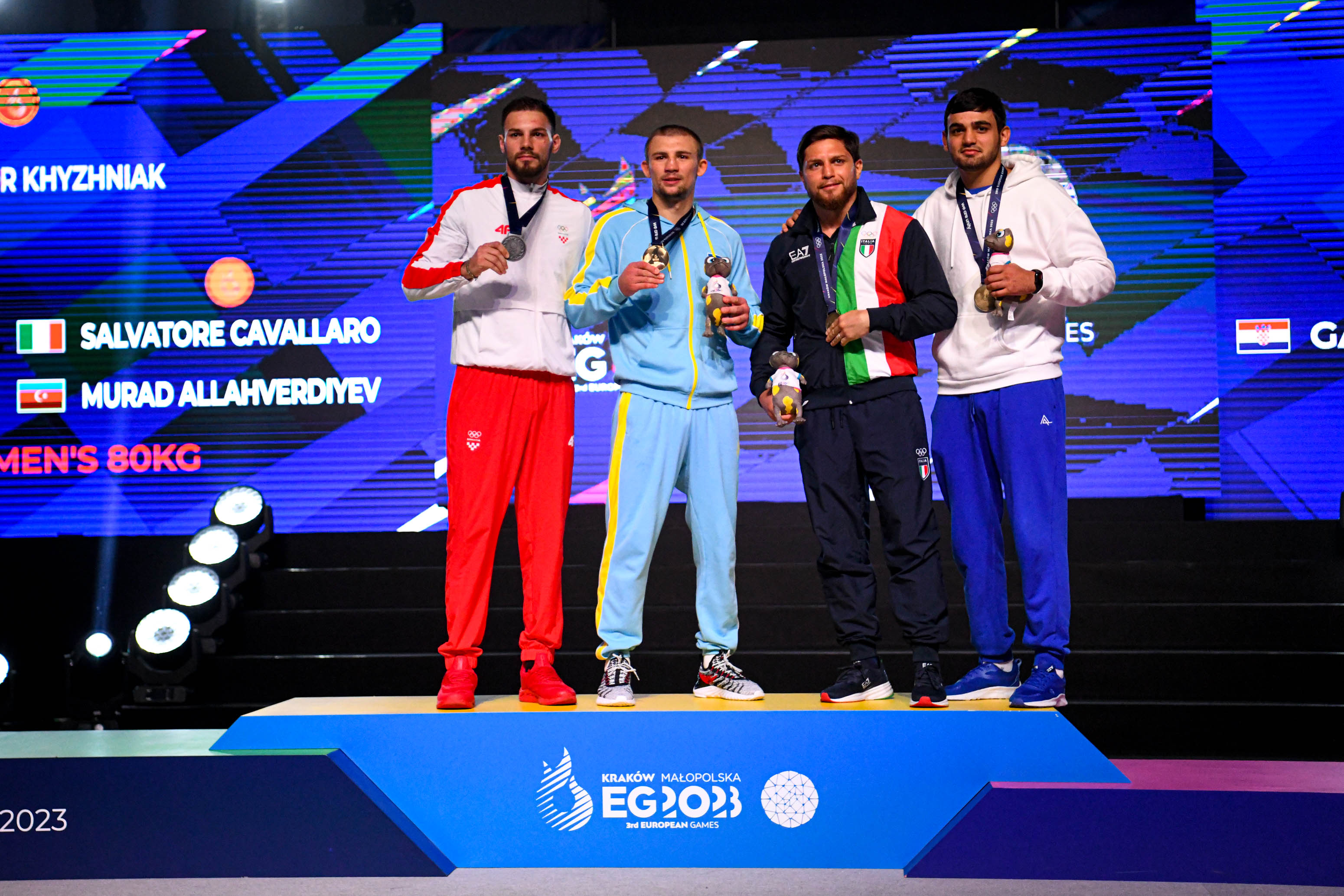
- Venue: Nowy Targ Arena
- Location: Nowy Targ, Poland
- Dates: 24 June – 1 July
- Competitors: 32 from 32 nations

Medalists
gold medal	Oleksandr Khyzhniak	Ukraine
silver medal	Gabrijel Veočić	Croatia
bronze medal	Salvatore Cavallaro	Italy
bronze medal	Murad Allahverdiyev	Azerbaijan

The men's light heavyweight boxing event at the 2023 European Games was held between 24 June and 1 July 2023.

== Results ==
=== Finals ===
Semi-finals
Salvatore Cavallaro (ITA)	0
Oleksandr Khyzhniak (UKR)	5
Gabrijel Veočić (CRO)	5
Murad Allahverdiyev (AZE)	0

Final
Oleksandr Khyzhniak (UKR)	RSC
Gabrijel Veočić (CRO)

=== Top half ===
==== Section 1 ====
Round of 32
Gradus Kraus (NED)	RSC-I
Jindřich Janečka (CZE)
Robertas Liorančas (LTU)	5
Andrei Chiriacov (MDA)	0
Gazimagomed Jalidov (ESP)	5
Klemens Szczepaniak (POL)	0
Salvatore Cavallaro (ITA)	5
Redis Karaj (ALB)	0

Round of 16
Gradus Kraus (NED)	w/o
Robertas Liorančas (LTU)
Gazimagomed Jalidov (ESP)	1
Salvatore Cavallaro (ITA)	4

Quarterfinals
Gradus Kraus (NED)	0
Salvatore Cavallaro (ITA)	5

==== Section 2 ====
Round of 32
Mathieu Bauderlique (FRA)	0
Taylor Bevan (GBR)	5
Kelyn Cassidy (IRL)	5
Mindaugas Gedminas (NOR)	0
Michail Tsamalidis (GRE)	5
Arjan Iseni (MKD)	0
Oleksandr Khyzhniak (UKR)	RSC
Georgii Kushitashvili (GEO)

Round of 16
Taylor Bevan (GBR)	0
Kelyn Cassidy (IRL)	5
Michail Tsamalidis (GRE)	0
Oleksandr Khyzhniak (UKR)	5

Quarterfinals
Kelyn Cassidy (IRL)	0
Oleksandr Khyzhniak (UKR)	3

=== Bottom half ===
==== Section 3 ====
Round of 32
Altin Shala (KOS)
Daniel Ilyushonok (ISR)	KO
Leo Cvitanović (BIH)	1
Stiven Aas (EST)	4
Andrei Arădoaie (ROU)	3
Kaan Aykutsun (TUR)	1
Kristiyan Nikolov (BUL)	1
Gabrijel Veočić (CRO)	4

Round of 16
Daniel Ilyushonok (ISR)
Stiven Aas (EST)	DSQ
Andrei Arădoaie (ROU)	0
Gabrijel Veočić (CRO)	5

Quarterfinals
Stiven Aas (EST)	0
Gabrijel Veočić (CRO)	5

==== Section 4 ====
Round of 32
Murad Allahverdiyev (AZE)	RSC
Kevin Schumann (GER)
Rūdolfs Ozols (LAT)
Nikita Nystedt (FIN)	RSC-I
Pylyp Akilov (HUN)	2
Vladimir Mironchikov (SRB)	3
Hambardzum Hakobyan (ARM)	4
Petar Marčić (MNE)	1

Round of 16
Murad Allahverdiyev (AZE)	4
Nikita Nystedt (FIN)	1
Vladimir Mironchikov (SRB)	2
Hambardzum Hakobyan (ARM)	3

Quarterfinals
Murad Allahverdiyev (AZE)	5
Hambardzum Hakobyan (ARM)	0
