= 2025 IBA World Boxing Championships – Light heavyweight =

Light heavyweight at the 2025 IBA World Boxing Championships
- Venue: Dubai Duty Free Tennis Stadium
- Location: Dubai, United Arab Emirates
- Dates: 4–13 December
- Competitors: 41

Medalists
gold medal	Dzhambulat Bizhamov	Russia
silver medal	Javokhir Ummataliev	Uzbekistan
bronze medal	Arlen López	Cuba
bronze medal	Gazimagomed Jalidov	Spain

The Light heavyweight competition at the 2025 IBA Men's World Boxing Championships was held from 4 to 13 December 2025.

== Results ==
=== Finals ===
Semifinals
(Cuba) Arlen López	0
(Uzbekistan) Javokhir Ummataliev	5
(Russia) Dzhambulat Bizhamov	5
(Spain) Gazimagomed Jalidov	0

Final
(Uzbekistan) Javokhir Ummataliev	0
(Russia) Dzhambulat Bizhamov	5

=== Top half ===
==== Section 1 ====
Round of 64
(Paraguay) Rody Riquelme
(Turkey) Bayram Malkan	RSC-I

Round of 32
(Cuba) Arlen López	4
(Turkey) Bayram Malkan	1
(Malaysia) Muhammad Syahmi Bin Kauthar	0
(Iraq) Ridha Talib Jabbar	5
(Tajikistan) Nekruz Salimov	4
(Cambodia) Anvar Nasredinov	1
(Nepal) Deepak Shrestha	0
(North Macedonia) Arjan Iseni	5

Round of 16
(Cuba) Arlen López	WO
(Iraq) Ridha Talib Jabbar
(Tajikistan) Nekruz Salimov	4
(North Macedonia) Arjan Iseni	1

Quarterfinals
(Cuba) Arlen López	4
(Tajikistan) Nekruz Salimov	3

==== Section 2 ====
Round of 64
(Sri Lanka) Harassiya Waththe Walisinh Rathnasiri	0
(French Polynesia) Tautuarii Nena	4
(Seychelles) Dasheil Fanchette	0
(Uzbekistan) Javokhir Ummataliev	5

Round of 32
(Israel) Daniel Ilyushonok	5
(French Polynesia) Tautuarii Nena	0
(Serbia) Artem Ageev	4
(Colombia) Juan Diego Ortiz	1
(Kyrgyzstan) Omurbek Bekzhigit Uulu	5
(Greece) Michail Tsamalidis	0
(Uzbekistan) Javokhir Ummataliev	5
(Haiti) Cedrick Belony-Duliepre	0

Round of 16
(Israel) Daniel Ilyushonok	0
(Serbia) Artem Ageev	5
(Kyrgyzstan) Omurbek Bekzhigit Uulu	0
(Uzbekistan) Javokhir Ummataliev	5

Quarterfinals
(Serbia) Artem Ageev	0
(Uzbekistan) Javokhir Ummataliev	5

=== Bottom half ===
==== Section 3 ====
Round of 64
(Sierra Leone) James Tamba
(Tonga) Tevita Malupo	KO
Meysam Gheshlaghi
(Latvia) Aleksandrs Maļinovskis	WO

Round of 32
(Russia) Dzhambulat Bizhamov	RSC
(Tonga) Tevita Malupo
(Kazakhstan) Yerassyl Zhakpekov	RSC
(Burkina Faso) Ebenezer Zoungrana
(Estonia) Anton Vinogradov	1
(Kenya) Robert Okaka	4
(Latvia) Aleksandrs Maļinovskis	0
(Tunisia) Youssef Rafrafi	5

Round of 16
(Russia) Dzhambulat Bizhamov	4
(Kazakhstan) Yerassyl Zhakpekov	1
(Kenya) Robert Okaka	RSC
(Tunisia) Youssef Rafrafi

Quarterfinals
(Russia) Dzhambulat Bizhamov	5
(Kenya) Robert Okaka	0

==== Section 4 ====
Round of 64
(India) Pravesh Kumar	5
(Democratic Republic of the Congo) Christopher Luteke	2
(Uganda) Abubakar Malindi Mutyaba	WO
(Malta) Vadim Staver

Round of 32
(Australia) Zachary Brown	5
(India) Pravesh Kumar	0
(Armenia) Artush Hovhannisyan	4
(Cameroon) Brandone Ngon a Ngon	1
(Saint Lucia) John Didier	DSQ
(Ivory Coast) Moussa Fessal Fofana
(Uganda) Abubakar Malindi Mutyaba
(Spain) Gazimagomed Jalidov	RSC

Round of 16
(Australia) Zachary Brown	1
(Armenia) Artush Hovhannisyan	4
(Saint Lucia) John Didier
(Spain) Gazimagomed Jalidov	RSC

Quarterfinals
(Armenia) Artush Hovhannisyan	0
(Spain) Gazimagomed Jalidov	5
