= Boxing at the 2022 Asian Games – Men's 80 kg =

Boxing competitions

Men's 80 kg at the 2022 Asian Games
- Venue: Hangzhou Gymnasium
- Date: 24 September – 5 October 2023
- Competitors: 18 from 18 nations

Medalists
gold medal	Tuohetaerbieke Tanglatihan	China
silver medal	Eumir Marcial	Philippines
bronze medal	Turabek Khabibullaev	Uzbekistan
bronze medal	Ahmad Ghossoun	Syria

The men's 80 kilograms event at the 2022 Asian Games took place from 24 September to 5 October 2023 at Hangzhou Gymnasium, Hangzhou, China.

== Schedule ==
All times are China Standard Time (UTC+08:00)

Date	Time	Event
Sunday, 24 September 2023	14:00	Preliminaries – R32
Friday, 29 September 2023	14:00	Preliminaries – R16
Sunday, 1 October 2023	14:00	Quarterfinals
Wednesday, 4 October 2023	14:00	Semifinals
Thursday, 5 October 2023	19:00	Final

== Results ==
Legend

- KO — Won by knockout
- RSC — Won by referee stop contest

=== Final ===
Final
Tuohetaerbieke Tanglatihan (CHN)	5
Eumir Marcial (PHI)	0

=== Top half ===
Preliminaries – R32
Turabek Khabibullaev (UZB)	5
Deepak Shrestha (NEP)	0

Preliminaries – R16
Mohammed Al-Subhi (KSA)
Turabek Khabibullaev (UZB)	RSC
Hussein Ishaish (JOR)	RSC
Maikhel Roberrd Muskita (INA)
Nurbek Oralbay (KAZ)	2
Tuohetaerbieke Tanglatihan (CHN)	3
Omurbek Bekzhigit Uulu (KGZ)	4
Lakshya Chahar (IND)	1

Quarterfinals
Turabek Khabibullaev (UZB)	3
Hussein Ishaish (JOR)	2
Tuohetaerbieke Tanglatihan (CHN)	4
Omurbek Bekzhigit Uulu (KGZ)	1

Semifinals
Turabek Khabibullaev (UZB)	1
Tuohetaerbieke Tanglatihan (CHN)	4

=== Bottom half ===
Preliminaries – R32
Eumir Marcial (PHI)	5
Ganzorigiin Dalai (MGL)	0

Preliminaries – R16
Ahmad Ghossoun (SYR)	4
Kim Jin-jea (KOR)	1
Shahin Mousavi (IRI)	1
Shabbos Negmatulloev (TJK)	4
Issei Aramoto (JPN)
Weerapon Jongjoho (THA)	RSC
Eumir Marcial (PHI)	5
Nguyễn Mạnh Cường (VIE)	0

Quarterfinals
Ahmad Ghossoun (SYR)	5
Shabbos Negmatulloev (TJK)	0
Weerapon Jongjoho (THA)
Eumir Marcial (PHI)	KO

Semifinals
Ahmad Ghossoun (SYR)
Eumir Marcial (PHI)	KO
