= Boxing at the 2026 Commonwealth Games – Men's 80 kg =

Boxing competitions

Boxing – Men's 80 kg at the 2026 Commonwealth Games
- Venue: SEC Centre
- Dates: July 25 – 1 August 2026
- Competitors: 24 from 24 nations

Medalists
gold medal	Ankush Panghal	India
silver medal	Dimeji Shittu	England
bronze medal	Joshua Ofori	Canada
bronze medal	Paul Trainor	Australia

The men's 80 kg boxing competitions at the 2026 Commonwealth Games in Glasgow, Scotland took place between July 25 and August 1 at the SEC Centre.

Like all Commonwealth boxing events, the competition was a straight single-elimination tournament. Both semifinal losers were awarded bronze medals, so no boxers competed again after their first loss. Bouts consisted of three rounds of three minutes each, with one-minute breaks between rounds.

== Schedule ==
The schedule was as follows:

Date	Round
Saturday 25 July	Preliminaries
Monday 27 July	Preliminaries
Wednesday 29 July	Quarter-finals
Friday 31 July	Semi-finals
Saturday 1 August	Final

== Results ==
The draw was as follows:

=== Bracket ===
Preliminaries
Happy Ngwira (MAW)
Zalaan Jan (ANT)	RSC
Jade Micock (SEY)	5
Lio Dicks (SOL)	0
Jeremiah Thomas (TTO)	0
Josh Tonga (TGA)	5
Joshua Ofori (CAN)	RSC
Sithija Sudamma (SRI)
Alfred Ojok (UGA)	5
Kalani Anitelea-Launiu (NIU)	0
David Akintola (NGR)	1
Yusuf Changalawe (TAN)	4
Dee Ioapo (SAM)	0
Daniel Pitt (WAL)	5
Alan Perrie (SCO)
Paul Trainor (AUS)	RSC

Round of 16
Ankush Panghal (IND)	5
Zalaan Jan (ANT)	0
Jade Micock (SEY)	4
Eoghan Quinn (NIR)	1
Desmond Pappoe (GHA)	3
Josh Tonga (TGA)	2
Joshua Ofori (CAN)	RSC
Aminiasi Saratibau (FIJ)
Dimeji Shittu (ENG)	5
Alfred Ojok (UGA)	0
Yusuf Changalawe (TAN)	0
Robert Okaka (KEN)	5
Kua Gunua Mua (PNG)	0
Daniel Pitt (WAL)	5
Paul Trainor (AUS)	3
Gebhard Tonateni Ipinge (NAM)	2

Quarterfinals
Ankush Panghal (IND)	5
Jade Micock (SEY)	0
Desmond Pappoe (GHA)
Joshua Ofori (CAN)	WO
Dimeji Shittu (ENG)	5
Robert Okaka (KEN)	0
Daniel Pitt (WAL)	1
Paul Trainor (AUS)	4

Semifinals
Ankush Panghal (IND)	5
Joshua Ofori (CAN)	0
Dimeji Shittu (ENG)	5
Paul Trainor (AUS)	0

Final
Ankush Panghal (IND)	4
Dimeji Shittu (ENG)	1
