= Boxing at the 2018 Summer Youth Olympics – Boys' middleweight =

Boxing competitions

Boys' middleweight boxing at the III Summer Youth Olympic Games
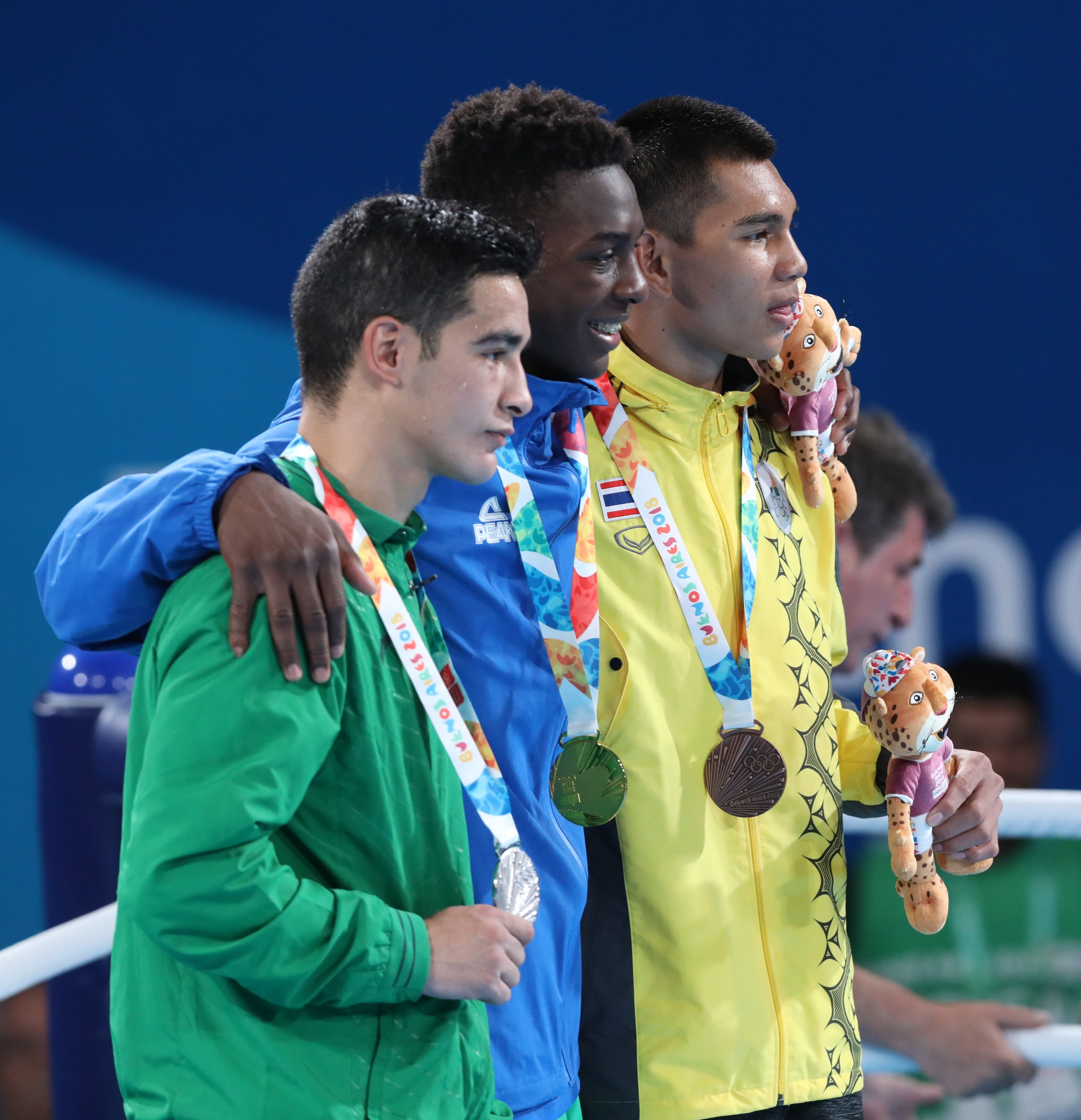
- Venue: Oceania Pavilion
- Date: 14–17 October
- Competitors: 6 from 6 nations

Medalists
1st place, gold medalist(s)		Keno Machado	Brazil
2nd place, silver medalist(s)		Farid Douibi	Algeria
3rd place, bronze medalist(s)		Weerapon Jongjoho	Thailand

The boys' middleweight boxing competition at the 2018 Summer Youth Olympics in Buenos Aires was held from 14 to 17 October at the Oceania Pavilion.

== Schedule ==
All times are local (UTC−3).

Date	Time	Round
Sunday, 14 October	19:03	Preliminary Round 1
Monday, 15 October	18:44	Preliminary Round 2
Tuesday, 16 October	19:01	Semifinals
Wednesday, 17 October	19:01	Finals

== Results ==
Preliminary Round 1
Naichel Millas (ITA)	1
Weerapon Jongjoho (THA)	4
Giodanny Jiménez (VEN)	0
Jancen Poutoa (SAM)	5

Preliminary Round 2
Keno Machado (BRA)	WO
Naichel Millas (ITA)
Giodanny Jiménez (VEN)	0
Farid Douibi (ALG)	5

Semifinals
Weerapon Jongjoho (THA)	0
Keno Machado (BRA)	5
Farid Douibi (ALG)	5
Jancen Poutoa (SAM)	0
Fifth place
Naichel Millas (ITA)
Giodanny Jiménez (VEN)	WO

Final
Keno Machado (BRA)	5
Farid Douibi (ALG)	0
Third place
Weerapon Jongjoho (THA)	5
Jancen Poutoa (SAM)	0

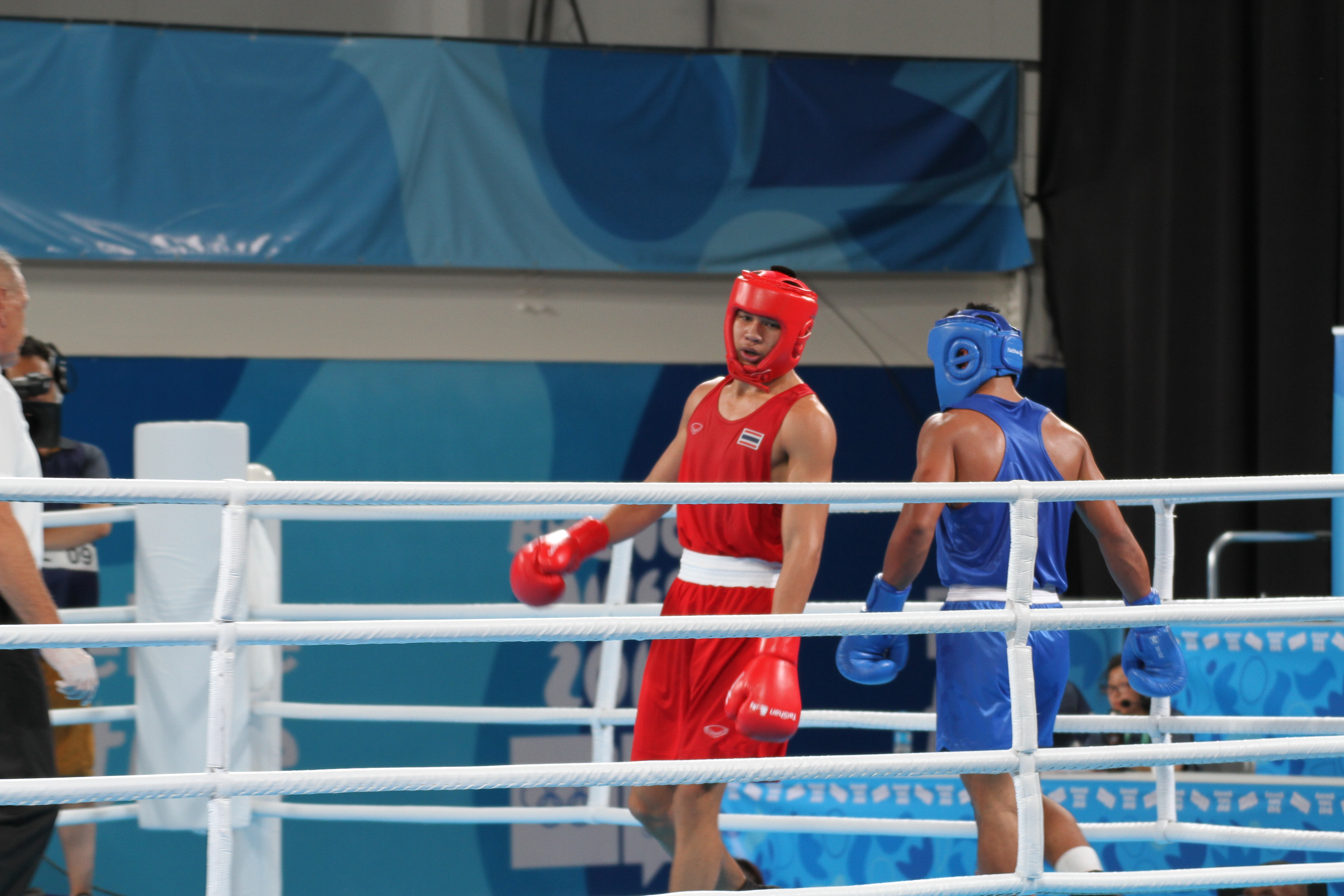
Bronze medal match: Weerapon Jongjoho vs. Jancen Poutoa

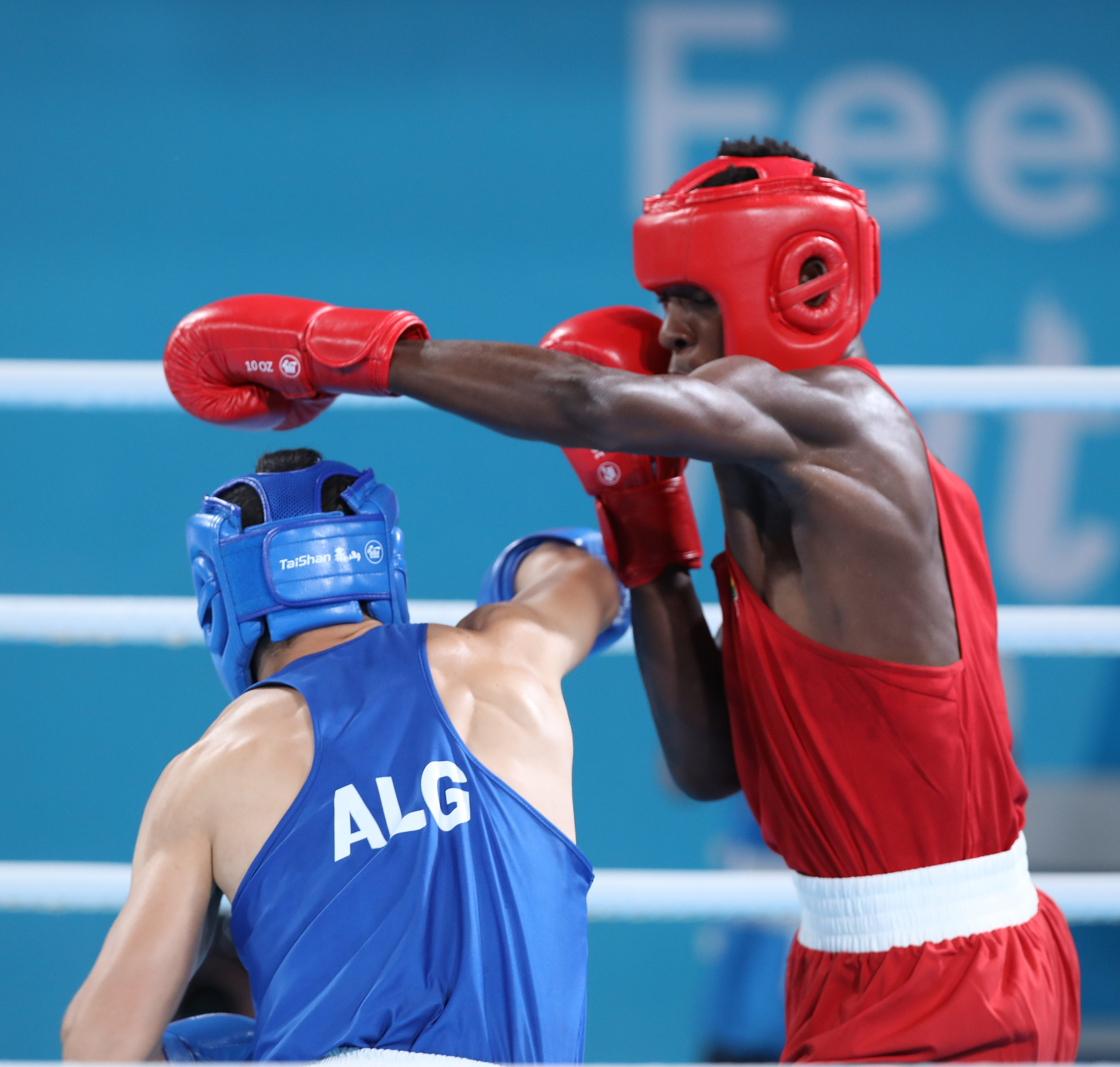
Gold medal match: Keno Machado vs. Farid Douibi

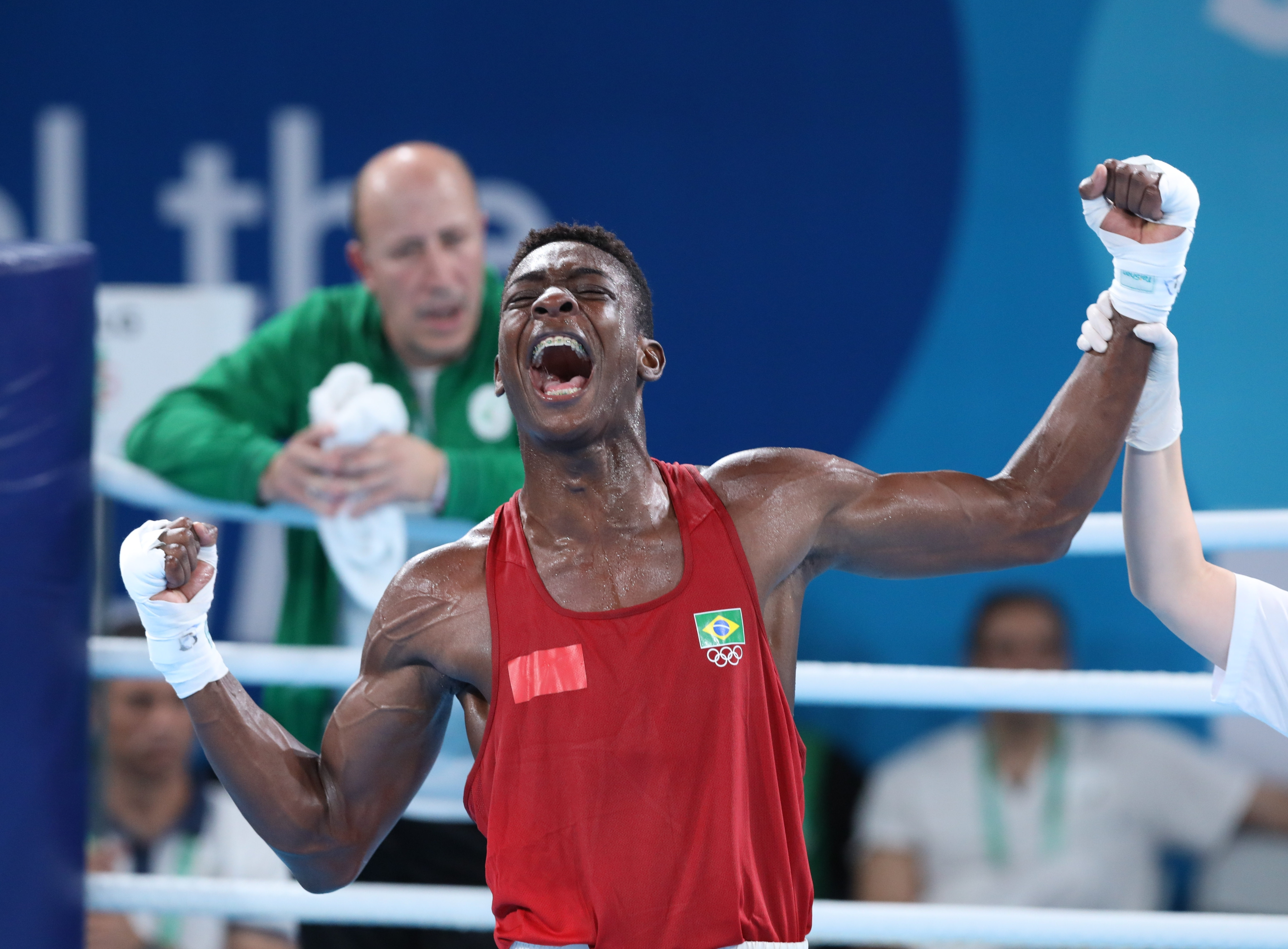
Keno Machado celebrating his victory

== Final standings ==
Rank	Athlete
1st place, gold medalist(s)	Keno Machado (BRA)
2nd place, silver medalist(s)	Farid Douibi (ALG)
3rd place, bronze medalist(s)	Weerapon Jongjoho (THA)
4	Jancen Poutoa (SAM)
5	Giodanny Jiménez (VEN)
6	Naichel Millas (ITA)
