= 2026 European Boxing Championships – Men's 75 kg =

Men's 75 kg at the 2026 European Boxing Championships
- Venue: Asics Arena
- Location: Sofia, Bulgaria
- Dates: 18–25 September
- Competitors: 23 from 23 nations

Medalists
gold medal	Saidjamshid Jafarov	Azerbaijan
silver medal	Ismail Mutsolgov	Russia
bronze medal	Rami Kiwan	Bulgaria
bronze medal	Callum Makin	England

The men's 75 kg competition at the 2026 European Boxing Championships was held from 18 to 25 September 2026.

== Results ==
=== Final ===
Final; 25 September
(Russia) Ismail Mutsolgov	0
(Azerbaijan) Saidjamshid Jafarov	5

=== Top half ===
Round of 32; 18 September
(Belgium) Idriss Khlifi	5
(Slovakia) Ladislav Horváth	0
(Croatia) Petar Krešimir Knežević	2
(Serbia) Almir Memić	3
(Hungary) Pylyp Akilov	5
(Turkey) Vedat Kaçar	0

Round of 16; 21 September
(Bulgaria) Rami Kiwan	5
(Belgium) Idriss Khlifi	0
(Republic of Ireland) Gavin Rafferty	0
(Poland) Mateusz Urban	5
(Russia) Ismail Mutsolgov	5
(Serbia) Almir Memić	0
(Hungary) Pylyp Akilov	5
(Israel) Miroslav Kapuler	0

Quarterfinals; 23 September
(Bulgaria) Rami Kiwan	5
(Poland) Mateusz Urban	0
(Russia) Ismail Mutsolgov	4
(Hungary) Pylyp Akilov	1

Semifinals; 24 September
(Bulgaria) Rami Kiwan	1
(Russia) Ismail Mutsolgov	4

=== Bottom half ===
Round of 32; 18 September
(Belarus) Viktar Murashkin	1
(Romania) Alexandru Buleu	4
(Armenia) Marat Mikaelyan	5
(Portugal) Diogo Semedo	0
(Sweden) Kevin Scott	5
(Ukraine) Dzhamal Kuliiev	0
(Moldova) Davron Bozorov	0
(Germany) Mouxime Abdoulay	5

Round of 16; 21 September
(England) Callum Makin	5
(Romania) Alexandru Buleu	0
(Armenia) Marat Mikaelyan	5
(Greece) Panagiotis Roidos	0
(Albania) Ahmed Koçi	0
(Sweden) Kevin Scott	5
(Germany) Mouxime Abdoulay	0
(Azerbaijan) Saidjamshid Jafarov	5

Quarterfinals; 23 September
(England) Callum Makin	3
(Armenia) Marat Mikaelyan	2
(Sweden) Kevin Scott	0
(Azerbaijan) Saidjamshid Jafarov	5

Semifinals; 24 September
(England) Callum Makin	1
(Azerbaijan) Saidjamshid Jafarov	4
