= 2025 IBA World Boxing Championships – Middleweight =

Middleweight at the 2025 IBA World Boxing Championships
- Venue: Dubai Duty Free Tennis Stadium
- Location: Dubai, United Arab Emirates
- Dates: 4–13 December
- Competitors: 42

Medalists
gold medal	Ismail Mutsolgov	Russia
silver medal	Sabirzhan Akkalykov	Kazakhstan
bronze medal	Fazliddin Erkinboev	Uzbekistan
bronze medal	Djibril Traoré	Mali

The Middleweight competition at the 2025 IBA Men's World Boxing Championships was held from 4 to 13 December 2025.

== Results ==
=== Finals ===
Semifinals
(Uzbekistan) Fazliddin Erkinboev
(Kazakhstan) Sabirzhan Akkalykov	WO
(Russia) Ismail Mutsolgov	5
(Mali) Djibril Traoré	0

Final
(Kazakhstan) Sabirzhan Akkalykov	0
(Russia) Ismail Mutsolgov	5

=== Top half ===
==== Section 1 ====
Round of 64
(Palestine) Qasim Abudabaat	1
Michael Likalu	4
(Armenia) Vakhtang Harutyunyan	WO
(Niger) Abdoul Baki Adamou
(Liberia) Amadou Keita
(Kyrgyzstan) Syrgak Abdyzhapar Uulu	WO

Round of 32
(Azerbaijan) Saidjamshid Jafarov	4
Michael Likalu	3
(Bahrain) Aly Amr Ahmed	ABD
(Romania) Amir Abbas
(India) Ankit Kumar
(Armenia) Vakhtang Harutyunyan	KO
(Kyrgyzstan) Syrgak Abdyzhapar Uulu	0
(Uzbekistan) Fazliddin Erkinboev	5

Round of 16
(Azerbaijan) Saidjamshid Jafarov	5
(Bahrain) Aly Amr Ahmed	0
(Armenia) Vakhtang Harutyunyan	0
(Uzbekistan) Fazliddin Erkinboev	5

Quarterfinals
(Azerbaijan) Saidjamshid Jafarov	0
(Uzbekistan) Fazliddin Erkinboev	5

==== Section 2 ====
Round of 64
(Tanzania) Enzi Methew Kasililika
(Seychelles) Joshua Aaron Cousin	RSC
(Israel) Miroslav Kapuler	5
(Solomon Islands) Osward Talaka	0

Round of 32
(Kazakhstan) Sabirzhan Akkalykov	KO
(Seychelles) Joshua Aaron Cousin
(Mauritius) Merven Clair	1
(New Zealand) Tawhirimatea Toheriri-Hallet	4
(Colombia) Juan González	5
Tharindu Roshan	0
(Israel) Miroslav Kapuler	4
(Kenya) Edwin Owuor	1

Round of 16
(Kazakhstan) Sabirzhan Akkalykov	5
(New Zealand) Tawhirimatea Toheriri-Hallet	0
(Colombia) Juan González	1
(Israel) Miroslav Kapuler	4

Quarterfinals
(Kazakhstan) Sabirzhan Akkalykov	RSC
(Israel) Miroslav Kapuler

=== Bottom half ===
==== Section 3 ====
Round of 64
(Angola) Avelino Luzito	1
(Scotland) Alan Perrie	4
(Greece) Theocharis Tsaousidis	WO
(Italy) Ismail Airoud

Round of 32
(Papua New Guinea) Kendu Steven	0
(Scotland) Alan Perrie	5
(Moldova) Davron Bozorov	4
(Guyana) Desmond Amsterdam	3
(Germany) Davyd Shtepa	WO
(Libya) Ayman Al-Baseer
(Greece) Theocharis Tsaousidis	0
(Russia) Ismail Mutsolgov	5

Round of 16
(Scotland) Alan Perrie	WO
(Moldova) Davron Bozorov
(Germany) Davyd Shtepa	0
(Russia) Ismail Mutsolgov	5

Quarterfinals
(Scotland) Alan Perrie	0
(Russia) Ismail Mutsolgov	5

==== Section 4 ====
Round of 64
(England) Vinny Mandair	3
(Mali) Djibril Traoré	4
(Rwanda) Innocent Mugenga	0
(Sri Lanka) Yazmin Muhammed Usaith	5
(Democratic Republic of the Congo) David Tshama
(Tajikistan) Shokhobzhon Shukurov	WO

Round of 32
(Australia) Malakai Katene
(Mali) Djibril Traoré	RSC
(Sri Lanka) Yazmin Muhammed Usaith	5
(Saint Lucia) Kyle Marcel	0
(Spain) Sergio Martínez	KO
(Portugal) Diogo Semedo
(Tajikistan) Shokhobzhon Shukurov	5
(Zimbabwe) Christian Ndlovu	0

Round of 16
(Mali) Djibril Traoré	4
(Sri Lanka) Yazmin Muhammed Usaith	3
(Spain) Sergio Martínez	4
(Tajikistan) Shokhobzhon Shukurov	3

Quarterfinals
(Mali) Djibril Traoré	5
(Spain) Sergio Martínez	0
