= Javokhir =

Javokhir (Uzbek: Жавоҳир) is a masculine given name. Notable people with the name include:

- Javokhir Sidikov (born 1996), Uzbek football midfielder
- Javokhir Sindarov (born 2005), Uzbek chess grandmaster
- Javokhir Sokhibov (born 1995), Uzbek football midfielder
- Javokhir Ummataliev (born 2005), Uzbek amateur boxer
