= Boxing at the 2024 Summer Olympics – Men's 80 kg =

Men's 80 kg at the Games of the XXXIII Olympiad
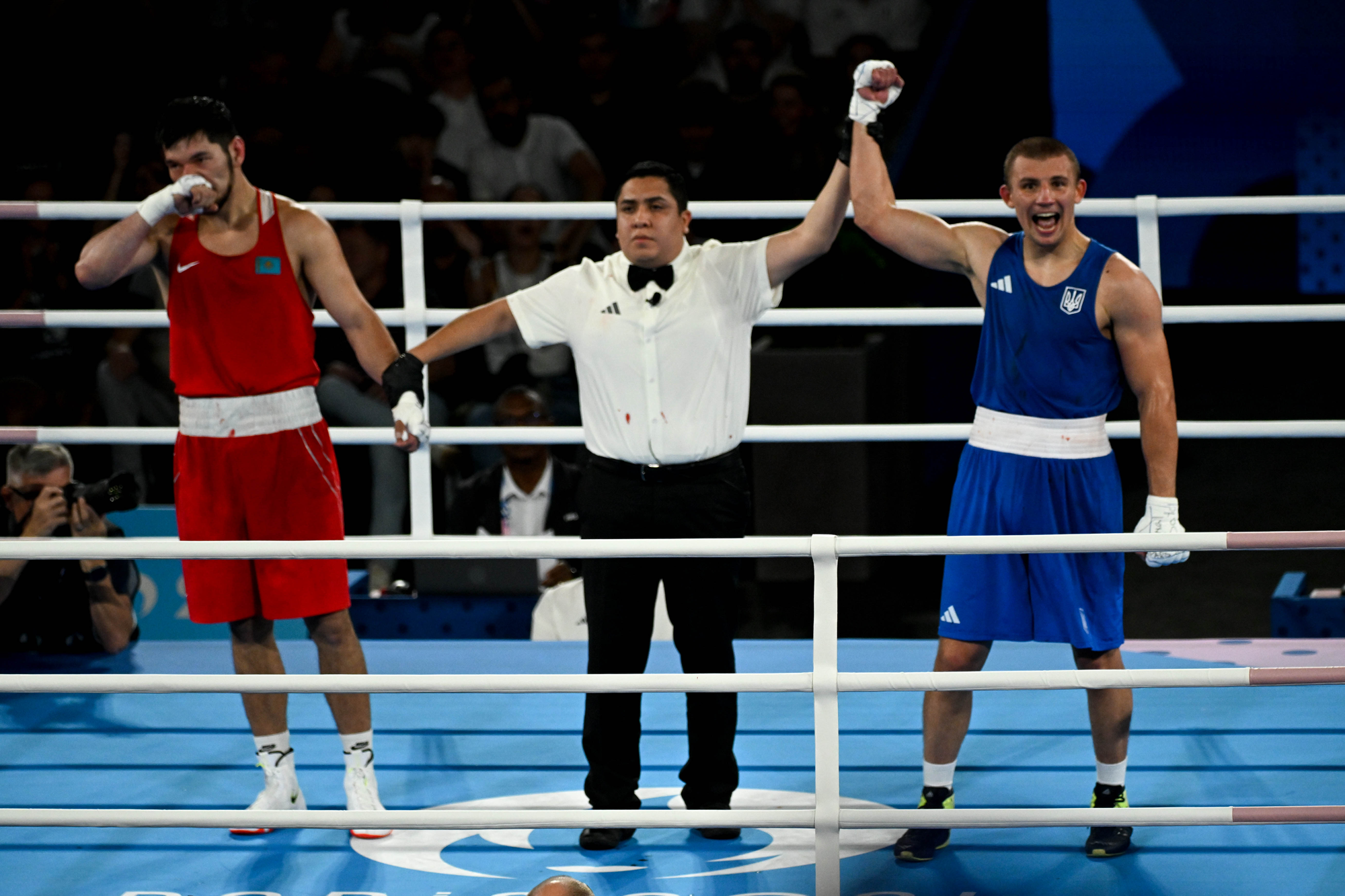
- Referee Emerson Alejandro Pastor Arreaga raises Khyzhniak's hand after the judges declare him the winner in the gold medal bout
- Venue: Arena Paris Nord (preliminary); Stade Roland Garros (semifinals and finals)
- Dates: 27 July – 7 August 2024
- Competitors: 18 from 18 nations

Medalists
1st place, gold medalist(s)		Oleksandr Khyzhniak	Ukraine
2nd place, silver medalist(s)		Nurbek Oralbay	Kazakhstan
3rd place, bronze medalist(s)		Cristian Pinales	Dominican Republic
3rd place, bronze medalist(s)		Arlen López	Cuba

The men's 80 kg (middleweight) boxing event at the 2024 Summer Olympics took place between 27 July and 7 August 2024. Preliminary boxing matches occurred at Arena Paris Nord in Villepinte, with the medal rounds (semifinals and finals) staged at Stade Roland Garros.

== Background ==
This was the 27th Olympic appearance of the men's middleweight event. The event appeared at the first Olympic boxing tournament in 1904 and has been part of the boxing events at every Games (except in 1912) since. The middleweight class remains at the 69–75 kg range it has used since the 2004 Games.

The defending champion Hebert Conceição turned professional and did not participate, the 2020 silver medalist Oleksandr Khyzhniak won the competition, one of the 2020 bronze medalists, Eumir Marcial, lost to Turabek Khabibullaev, and another one, Gleb Bakshi did not participate since IOC barred the Russian Olympic Committee due to war in Ukraine.

== Qualification ==
Each NOC could send one boxer to the event.

== Competition format ==
Like all Olympic boxing events, the competition was a straight single-elimination tournament. The competition began with a preliminary round, where the number of competitors was reduced to 16, and concluded with a final. As there were fewer than 32 boxers in the competition, a number of boxers received a bye through the preliminary round. Both semi-final losers were awarded bronze medals.

Bouts consisted of three three-minute rounds with a one-minute break between rounds. A boxer may win by knockout or by points. Scoring was on the "10-point-must," with five judges scoring each round. Judges consider "number of blows landed on the target areas, domination of the bout, technique and tactical superiority and competitiveness." Each judge determined a winner for each round, who received 10 points for the round, and assigned the round's loser a number of points between seven and nine based on performance. A judge's scores for each round were added to give a total score for that judge. The boxer with the higher score from a majority of the judges was the winner.

== Schedule ==
The schedule was as follows.

Legend

R32	Round of 32	R16	Round of 16	QF	Quarter-Finals	SF	Semi-Finals	F	Final

Jul 27	Jul 28	Jul 29	Jul 30	Jul 31	Aug 1	Aug 2	Aug 3	Aug 4	Aug 5	Aug 6	Aug 7
R32			R16			QF		SF			F

== Draw ==
The draw was held on 25 July 2024.

== Seeds ==
The seeds were released on 25 July 2024.

1. Tuohetaerbieke Tanglatihan (CHN) (round of 16)
2. Arlen López (CUB) (semifinals)
3. Oleksandr Khyzhniak (UKR) (champion)
4. Abdelrahman Oraby (EGY) (round of 16)
5. Callum Peters (AUS) (round of 16)
6. Wanderley Pereira (BRA) (quarterfinals)
7. Eumir Marcial (PHI) (round of 16)
8. Gabrijel Veočić (CRO) (quarterfinals)

== Results ==
=== Round of 32 ===
Round of 32
27 July
Weerapon Jongjoho (THA)	0
Cristian Pinales (DOM)	5

Round of 32
27 July
Kaan Aykutsun (TUR)	4
Salvatore Cavallaro (ITA)	1

=== Bracket ===
Round of 16
30 July
Tuohetaerbieke Tanglatihan (CHN)	0
Cristian Pinales (DOM)	5
30 July
Hussein Ishaish (JOR)	0
Gabrijel Veočić (CRO)	5
30 July
Callum Peters (AUS)	2
Nurbek Oralbay (KAZ)	3
30 July
Murad Allahverdiyev (AZE)	5
Abdelrahman Oraby (EGY)	0
30 July
Oleksandr Khyzhniak (UKR)	5
Pylyp Akilov (HUN)	0
30 July
Cédrick Belony-Dulièpre (HAI)	0
Wanderley Pereira (BRA)	5
30 July
Eumir Marcial (PHI)	0
Turabek Khabibullaev (UZB)	5
30 July
Kaan Aykutsun (TUR)	0
Arlen López (CUB)	5

Quarterfinals
2 August
Cristian Pinales (DOM)	5
Gabrijel Veočić (CRO)	0
2 August
Nurbek Oralbay (KAZ)	5
Murad Allahverdiyev (AZE)	0
2 August
Oleksandr Khyzhniak (UKR)	5
Wanderley Pereira (BRA)	0
2 August
Turabek Khabibullaev (UZB)	2
Arlen López (CUB)	3

Semifinals
4 August
Cristian Pinales (DOM)	2
Nurbek Oralbay (KAZ)	3
4 August
Oleksandr Khyzhniak (UKR)	3
Arlen López (CUB)	2

Final
7 August
Nurbek Oralbay (KAZ)	2
Oleksandr Khyzhniak (UKR)	3
