= Tonga Tongotongo =

Australian boxer (born 1998)

Personal information
- Nickname: Mr Antman
- Born: 15 July 1998 (age 28) Māngere, New Zealand
- Weight: Cruiserweight, Light-heavyweight

Boxing career
- Stance: Orthodox

Boxing record
- Total fights: 10
- Wins: 9
- Win by KO: 9
- Losses: 1

Tonga Tongotongo (born July 15, 1998) is a New Zealand-born, Australian professional boxer. He competes in the light-heavyweight division where he his the current IBO Asian Pacific cruiserweight champion.

== Rugby League career ==
Before starting his boxing career Tongatonga played as a back in rugby league for the Corrimal Cougars. He decided to stop playing deeming the sport too soft.

== Boxing career ==
Tongotongo lost to Kirra Ruston in a fight for the vacant Australian light-heavyweight title on 12 March 2025.

== Professional boxing record ==
10 fights	9 wins	1 loss
By knockout	9	1

No.	Result	Record	Opponent	Type	Round, time	Date	Location	Notes
10	Loss	9–1	Kirra Ruston	RTD	6 (10), 3:00	12 Mar 2025	Hordern Pavilion, Sydney, Australia	For vacant Australian light-heavyweight title
9	Win	9–0	Sebastian Singh	TKO	7 (10), 2:27	26 Oct 2024	Prince Charles Park, Nadi, Fiji	
8	Win	8–0	Max Reeves	TKO	6 (10), 1:01	29 Jun 2024	Pullman Hotel, Albert Park, Victoria, Australia	
7	Win	7–0	Tyson Turner	TKO	5 (10), 1:45	23 March 2024	Bankstown City Paceway, Condell Park, New South Wales, Australia	
6	Win	6–0	Waikato Falefehi	TKO	3 (5), 2:10	28 Oct 2023	The Warwick, Cabramatta, New South Wales, Australia	
5	Win	5–0	Filimoni Naliva Jr	KO	1 (8), 2:42	22 Jul 2023	Towradgi Beach Hotel, Towradgi, New South Wales, Australia	
4	Win	4–0	Aaron Cocco	TK0	5 (8), 2:41	20 May 2023	Nelson Bay Bowling and Recreation Club, Nelson Bay, New South Wales, Australia	
3	Win	3–0	Maksym Pus	3 (8)	8	12 Nov 2022	Towradgi Beach Hotel, Towradgi, New South Wales, Australia	
2	Win	2–0	Nelson Samson	KO	1 (4), 2:55	27 Aug 2022	Towradgi Beach Hotel, Towradgi, New South Wales, Australia	
1	Win	1–0	Rob Baron	KO	1 (4), 0:45	28 May 2022	The Snakepit Stadium, Wollongong, New South Wales, Australia	
