= Dzhambulat Bizhamov =

Russian boxer

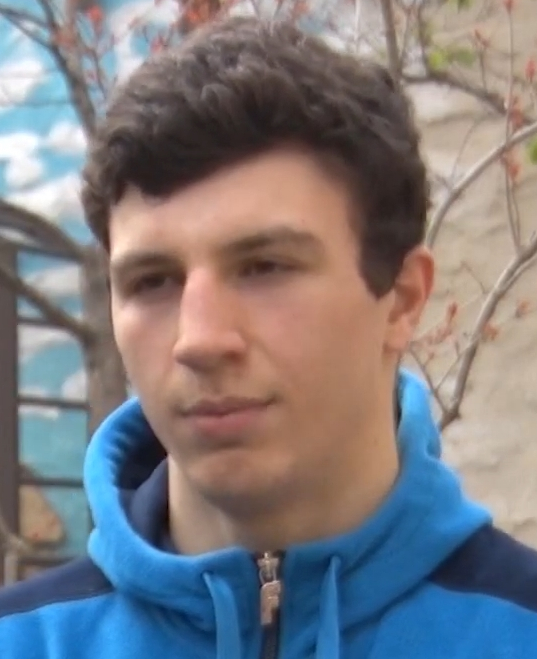
- Bizhamov in 2020

Personal information
- Nationality: Russia
- Born: 10 January 2001 (age 25) Makhachkala, Russia

Boxing career
Medal record
Men's amateur boxing
Representing (Russia) Russian Boxing Federation
IBA World Championships
Silver medal – second place	2021 Belgrade	Middleweight
Representing Russia
IBA World Championships
Gold medal – first place	2025 Dubai	Light heavyweight
European Championships
Silver medal – second place	2024 Belgrade	Middleweight

Dzhambulat Tagirovich Bizhamov (Russian: Джамбулат Тагирович Бижамов; born 10 January 2001) is a Russian boxer. He competed at the 2021 AIBA World Boxing Championships, winning the silver medal in the middleweight event. He also competed at the 2024 European Amateur Boxing Championships, winning the silver medal in the same event.
