= Weerapon Jongjoho =

Thai boxer (born 2001)

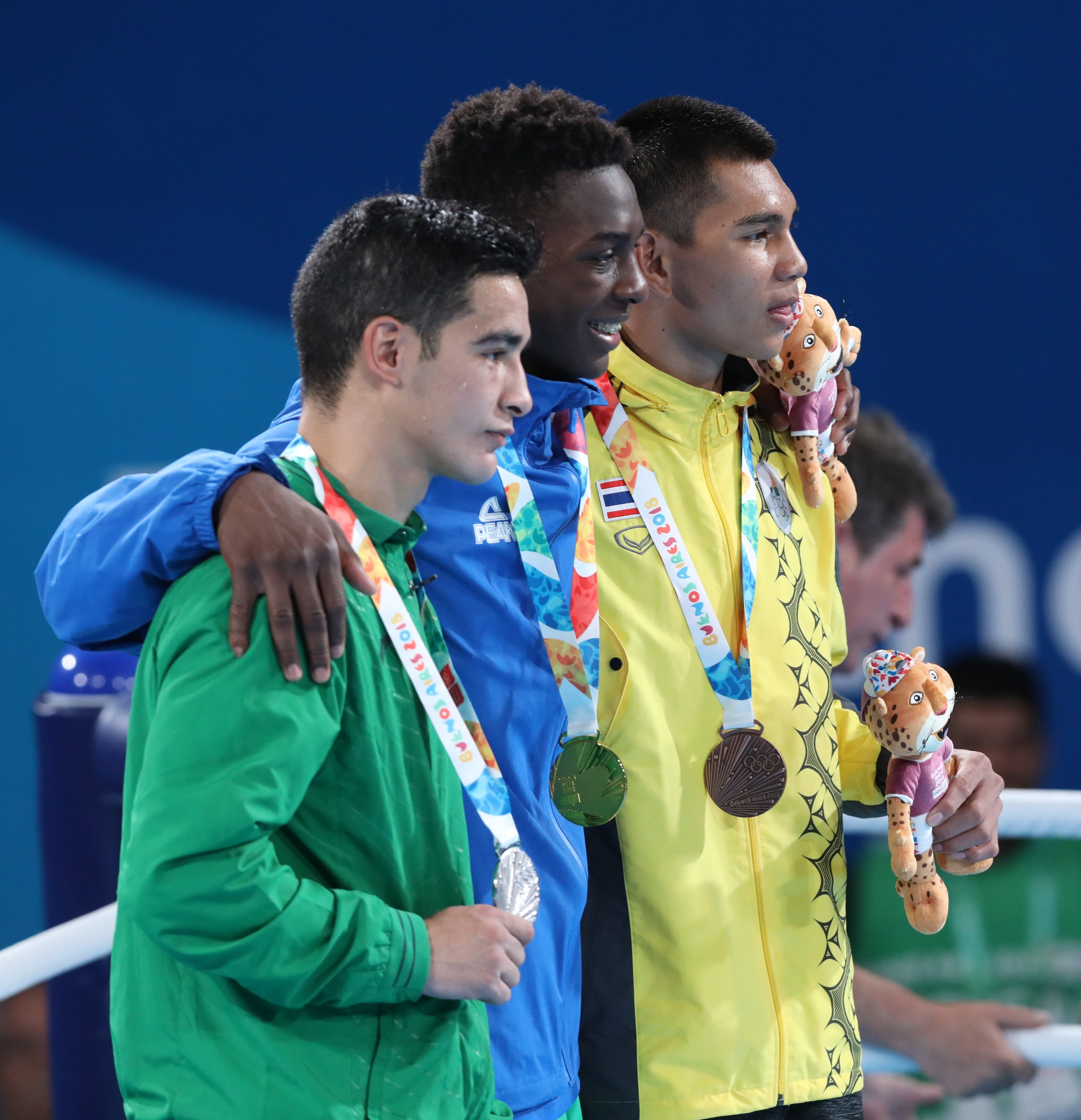
- Johgjoho (right) with Keno Machado and Farid Douibi in 2018

Personal information
- Nickname: Games
- Nationality: Thailand
- Born: 7 February 2001 (age 25)
- Height: 185 cm (6 ft 1 in)

Boxing career
Medal record
Men's amateur boxing
Representing Thailand
IBA World Championships
Bronze medal – third place	2021 Belgrade	Middleweight
SEA Games
Gold medal – first place	2023 Phnom Penh	Light heavyweight
Gold medal – first place	2025 Bangkok	Middleweight
Youth Olympic Games
Bronze medal – third place	2018 Buenos Aires	Boys' middleweight

Weerapon Jongjoho (Thai: วีระพล จงจอหอ; born 7 February 2001) is a Thai boxer. He competed at the 2018 Summer Youth Olympics, winning the bronze medal in the boys' middleweight event. He also competed at the 2021 AIBA World Boxing Championships, winning the bronze medal in the middleweight event. In a round, he defeated Ivan Papakin.

Somjit Jongjohor, the flyweight champion of the 2008 Summer Olympics, is his uncle.

Even though he is a nephew and there is an uncle as a role model, he is not like Somjit. Weerapon is considered a fighter-style boxer with an aggressive fighting style.

In the 2024 Summer Olympics, he competed in the 80 kg event (light heavyweight), he was eliminated in the first stage (round of 32) when he lost to Cristian Pinales from the Dominican Republic 0–5.

In the 2026 Asian Games, he competed in the 80 kg event (light heavyweight). He was eliminated in the first stage (round of 32) after losing 5–0 to China's Xiaobao Wang over three rounds, having been knocked down for an eight-count three times.
