= Cédrick Belony-Dulièpre =

Haitian boxer (born 1999)

Cédrick Belony-Dulièpre (born 24 January 1999 ) is a Haitian-Canadian boxer. Belony-Dulièpre was born in Haiti, but moved to the Canadian province of Quebec as a child. He took up the sport of boxing at 15 years old and represented Haiti at the 2024 Summer Olympics in Paris. Belony-Dulièpre made a quick exit in the first round of the men's 80kg boxing event, losing to Brazilian Wanderley Pereira 5-0.
