= 2022 Asian Youth & Junior Boxing Championships =

- Location: Amman, Jordan
- Dates: 2 – 14 March 2022
- Competitors: 352 from 21 nations

The 2022 Asian Youth & Junior Boxing Championships took place in Amman, Jordan from 2 to 14 March 2022.

Boxers (Men and Women) who were born in 2004 and in 2005 are eligible to participate for these championships. Also, younger boxers born in 2006 and 2007 could compete in the junior part of the championships in Jordan.

== Medalists ==
=== Women ===
Event	Gold	Silver	Bronze
Minimumweight (45–48 kg)	Nivedita Karki; India	Saidakhon Rakhmonova; Uzbekistan	Runrait Graisee; Thailand
Minimumweight (45–48 kg)	Nivedita Karki; India	Saidakhon Rakhmonova; Uzbekistan	Gulnazburibayeva; Kazakhstan
Light Flyweight (50 kg)	Tamanna; India	Robiyakhon Bakhtiyorova; Uzbekistan	Anita Adisheva; Kazakhstan
Light Flyweight (50 kg)	Tamanna; India	Robiyakhon Bakhtiyorova; Uzbekistan	Balqees Alameer; Jordan
Flyweight (52 kg)	Tomiris Myrzakul; Kazakhstan	Munavvar Fozilova; Uzbekistan	Kamonchanok Chupradit; Thailand
Flyweight (52 kg)	Tomiris Myrzakul; Kazakhstan	Munavvar Fozilova; Uzbekistan	Renu; India
Light Bantamweight (54 kg)	Viktoriya Baidukova; Kazakhstan	Rano Muratbaeva; Uzbekistan	Tanisha Lamba; India
Light Bantamweight (54 kg)	Viktoriya Baidukova; Kazakhstan	Rano Muratbaeva; Uzbekistan	Lalita Chainarong; Thailand
Bantamweight (57 kg)	Ulzhan Sarsenbek; Kazakhstan	Natnichachongprongklang; Thailand	Prachi; India
Bantamweight (57 kg)	Ulzhan Sarsenbek; Kazakhstan	Natnichachongprongklang; Thailand	Rukhshona Uktamova; Uzbekistan
Featherweight (60 kg)	Shaheen Gill; India	Mukhlisa Tokhirova; Uzbekistan	Aruzabal Gabek; Kazakhstan
Featherweight (60 kg)	Shaheen Gill; India	Mukhlisa Tokhirova; Uzbekistan	Kurmanbekova Baktygul; Kazakhstan
Lightweight (63 kg)	Ravina; India	Sitora Bahodirova; Uzbekistan	Nour Asad; Jordan
Lightweight (63 kg)	Ravina; India	Sitora Bahodirova; Uzbekistan	Uranchimeg Anujin; Mongolia
Light Welterweight (66 kg)	Bakyt Seidish; Kazakhstan	Priyanka; India	Feruza Alijonova; Uzbekistan
Light Welterweight (66 kg)	Bakyt Seidish; Kazakhstan	Priyanka; India	Wajd Al-Majali; Jordan
Welterweight (70 kg)	Aziza Zokirova; Uzbekistan	Gaukhar Shaibekova; Kazakhstan	Pranjal Yadav; India
Welterweight (70 kg)	Aziza Zokirova; Uzbekistan	Gaukhar Shaibekova; Kazakhstan	Zaya Murad; Jordan
Middleweight (75 kg)	Muskan; India	Aidasaribarova; Kazakhstan	Rasha Alshatti; Jordan
Middleweight (75 kg)	Muskan; India	Aidasaribarova; Kazakhstan	None awarded
Heavyweight (81 kg)	Kamila Bazhbenova; Kazakhstan	Oltinoy Sotimboeva; Uzbekistan	Sneha; India
Heavyweight (81 kg)	Kamila Bazhbenova; Kazakhstan	Oltinoy Sotimboeva; Uzbekistan	Layan Qubaj; Jordan
Super Heavyweight (81+ kg)	Sakhobat Khusanova; Uzbekistan	Kirti; India	Assel Toktassyn; Kazakhstan
Super Heavyweight (81+ kg)	Sakhobat Khusanova; Uzbekistan	Kirti; India	None awarded

=== Men ===
Event	Gold	Silver	Bronze
Minimumweight (46-48 kg)	Vishvanath Suresh; India	Ergeshov Bekzat; Kyrgyzstan	Miralijon Mavlonov; Uzbekistan
Minimumweight (46-48 kg)	Vishvanath Suresh; India	Ergeshov Bekzat; Kyrgyzstan	Otgonbayar Tuvshinzaya; Mongolia
Flyweight (51 kg)	Khujanazar Nortojiyev; Uzbekistan	Almatabduali; Kazakhstan	Raman; India
Flyweight (51 kg)	Khujanazar Nortojiyev; Uzbekistan	Almatabduali; Kazakhstan	Hayder Anwer Jasim Makass; Iraq
Bantamweight (54 kg)	Abduvali Buriboyev; Uzbekistan	Eljay Mabelin Pamisa; Philippines	Anand Yadav; India
Bantamweight (54 kg)	Abduvali Buriboyev; Uzbekistan	Eljay Mabelin Pamisa; Philippines	Nima Beygi; Iran
Featherweight (57 kg)	Bakhtiyor Asadov; Uzbekistan	Asylbek Uluu Akzhol; Kyrgyzstan	Bakhtiyar Nazarbayev; Kazakhstan
Featherweight (57 kg)	Bakhtiyor Asadov; Uzbekistan	Asylbek Uluu Akzhol; Kyrgyzstan	Chakharin Aekpatcha; Thailand
Lightweight (60 kg)	Almaz Orozbekov; Kyrgyzstan	Abdurahim Yoqubov; Tajikistan	Akbar Bissarev; Kazakhstan
Lightweight (60 kg)	Almaz Orozbekov; Kyrgyzstan	Abdurahim Yoqubov; Tajikistan	Sukhrob Aminov; Uzbekistan
Light Welterweight (63.5 kg)	Vanshaj; India	Javokhir Ummataliev; Uzbekistan	Ahmad Nabaa; Syria
Light Welterweight (63.5 kg)	Vanshaj; India	Javokhir Ummataliev; Uzbekistan	Madiyar Taipakov; Kazakhstan
Welterweight (67 kg)	Fazliddin Erkinboev; Uzbekistan	Islam Sovetov; Kazakhstan	Karrar Hayder Ismael Isma; Iraq
Welterweight (67 kg)	Fazliddin Erkinboev; Uzbekistan	Islam Sovetov; Kazakhstan	Mahdi Almatbouli; Jordan
Light Middleweight (71 kg)	Yegor Yegorov; Kazakhstan	Alisher Ayubov; Uzbekistan	Yusuf Fozilov; Tajikistan
Light Middleweight (71 kg)	Yegor Yegorov; Kazakhstan	Alisher Ayubov; Uzbekistan	Mohammad Alhussien; Jordan
Middleweight (75 kg)	Rakhmatullo Boymatov; Uzbekistan	Daulet Tulemissov; Kazakhstan	Nurlanbek Ermatov; Tajikistan
Middleweight (75 kg)	Rakhmatullo Boymatov; Uzbekistan	Daulet Tulemissov; Kazakhstan	Deepak; India
Light Heavyweight (80 kg)	Abdulaziz Abdurakhmonov; Uzbekistan	Sultanbek Aibaruly; Kazakhstan	Abolfazl Dana Gharehbag; Iran
Light Heavyweight (80 kg)	Abdulaziz Abdurakhmonov; Uzbekistan	Sultanbek Aibaruly; Kazakhstan	Razi Alhyasat; Jordan
Cruiserweight (86 kg)	Temirlan Mukatayev; Kazakhstan	Jamoliddin Kozokov; Uzbekistan	Tenizbekov Sanjar Bayasbe; Kyrgyzstan
Cruiserweight (86 kg)	Temirlan Mukatayev; Kazakhstan	Jamoliddin Kozokov; Uzbekistan	Akmaljon Abduvaliev Akmal; Tajikistan
Heavyweight (92 kg)	Aynazar Kenesbayev; Uzbekistan	Yerdos Sharipbek; Kazakhstan	Argen Baktybekov; Kyrgyzstan
Heavyweight (92 kg)	Aynazar Kenesbayev; Uzbekistan	Yerdos Sharipbek; Kazakhstan	Mohammad Katout; Jordan
Super Heavyweight (92+ kg)	Saif Al-Rawashdeh; Jordan	Aman Singh Bisht; India	Saparbekov Joodarbek; Kyrgyzstan
Super Heavyweight (92+ kg)	Saif Al-Rawashdeh; Jordan	Aman Singh Bisht; India	Timofey Potashov; Kazakhstan

=== Women ===
Event	Gold	Silver	Bronze
Minimumweight (46 kg)			
Light Flyweight (48 kg)			
Flyweight (50 kg)			
Light Bantamweight (52 kg)			
Bantamweight (54 kg)			
Featherweight (57 kg)			
Lightweight (60 kg)			
Light Welterweight (63 kg)			
Welterweight (66 kg)			
Light Middleweight (70 kg)			
Middleweight (75 kg)			
Heavyweight (80 kg)			
Super Heavyweight (80+ kg)			

=== Men ===
Event	Gold	Silver	Bronze
Minimumweight (46 kg)			
Light Flyweight (48 kg)			
Flyweight (50 kg)			
Bantamweight (54 kg)			
Featherweight (57 kg)			
Lightweight (60 kg)			
Light Welterweight (63 kg)			
Welterweight (66 kg)			
Light Middleweight (70 kg)			
Middleweight (75 kg)			
Heavyweight (80 kg)			
Super Heavyweight (80+ kg)			
