= Kirra Ruston =

Australian boxer (born 1998)

Personal information
- Born: 19 April 1998 (age 28) Southport, Queensland, Australia
- Height: 6 ft (183 cm)
- Weight: Light-heavyweight

Boxing career
- Stance: Orthodox

Boxing record
- Total fights: 10
- Wins: 10
- Win by KO: 10

Kirra Ruston (born 19 April 1998) is an Australian professional boxer. He has held the IBF Pan Pacific and Australian light-heavyweight titles.

== Career ==
As an amateur, Ruston represented Australia at the 2020 Asia and Oceania Olympic Qualifier and the 2023 IBA World Championships.

Unbeaten since turning professional in 2024, he claimed the vacant Australian light-heavyweight title in just his fifth pro-fight, with a win over the also previously undefeated Tonga Tongotongo at Hordern Pavilion in Sydney on 12 March 2025. Ruston knocked his opponent to the canvas in the sixth round and, although Tongotongo got back to his feet to make it to the bell, he retired on his stool before the start of round seven.

Ruston secured his seventh stoppage win in as many pro-fights by knocking out the previously undefeated Kartik Kumar in the second round of their non-title contest at Cairns Convention Centre on 25 June 2025.

On 26 August 2026, he stopped the previously unbeaten Saundre Simmons in the first round at Gold Coast Convention and Exhibition Centre in Broadbeach, Queensland, for his 10th successive win inside the distance and to claim the vacant IBF Pan Pacific light-heavyweight title.

== Professional boxing record ==
10 fights	10 wins	0 losses
By knockout	10	0

No.	Result	Record	Opponent	Type	Round, time	Date	Location	Notes
10	Win	10–0	Saundre Simmons	TKO	1 (10), 2:37	26 Aug 2026	Gold Coast Convention and Exhibition Centre, Broadbeach, Queensland, Australia	Won vacant IBF Pan Pacific light-heavyweight title
9	Win	9–0	Berkay Varol	TKO	3 (10), 1:41	6 May 2026	Newcastle Entertainment Centre, Broadmeadow, New South Wales, Australia	
8	Win	8–0	Theepakorn Pankasem	KO	2 (8), 1:46	7 Mar 2026	Perth Convention and Exhibition Centre, Perth, Western Australia, Australia	
7	Win	7–0	Kartik Kumar	KO	2 (6), 1:41	25 Jun 2025	Convention Centre, Cairns, Queensland, Australia	
6	Win	6–0	Dylan Wright	TKO	1 (6), 2:45	26 Apr 2025	RAC Arena, Perth, Western Australia, Australia	
5	Win	5–0	Tonga Tongotongo	RTD	6 (10), 3:00	12 Mar 2025	Hordern Pavilion, Sydney, New South Wales, Australia	Won vacant Australian light-heavyweight title
4	Win	4–0	Mohammed Nafiz	TKO	1 (4), 2:30	1 Mar 2025	South Bank Piazza, South Brisbane, Queensland, Australia	
3	Win	3–0	Brayden Nallajar	TKO	2 (4), 1:08	12 Oct 2024	Mansfield Tavern, Southport, Queensland, Australia	
2	Win	2–0	Paulo Ratumaikoro	KO	1 (5), 2:28	20 Jul 2024	Southport Sharks, Southport, Queensland, Australia	
1	Win	1–0	Ralph Etienne	KO	1 (4), 2:35	8 May 2024	Entertainment Centre, Logan Central, Queensland, Australia	
