= Wanderley Pereira =

Brazilian boxer (born 2001)

Personal information
- Nickname: Holyfield
- National team: Brazil
- Born: 2 May 2001 (age 25) Conceição do Almeida, Bahia, Brazil

Sport
- Country: Brazil
- Sport: Boxing
Medal record
Men's amateur boxing
Representing Brazil
World Championships
Silver medal – second place	2023 Tashkent	Middleweight
Pan American Games
Silver medal – second place	2023 Santiago	-80 kg
South American Games
Gold medal – first place	2022 Asunción	Light heavyweight
Gold medal – first place	2026 Santa Fe	–80 kg

Wanderley de Souza Pereira (born 2 May 2001) is a Brazilian boxer.

== Career ==
Born in Conceição do Almeida, in the interior of Bahia, and a fan of martial arts since childhood, he moved to São Paulo to train and quickly became one of the country's top boxers.

At the 2021 AIBA World Boxing Championships, he lost in the first round to Cuban Yoenlis Hernández, who ended up being the tournament champion.

At the 2022 South American Games held in Asunción, Paraguay, he won a gold medal in the Light heavyweight (80 kg) category.

At the 2023 IBA Men's World Boxing Championships held in Tashkent, Uzbekistan, he won a silver medal in the Middleweight category.

At the 2023 Pan American Games held in Santiago, Chile, he won a silver medal in the 80 kg category. With this, he qualified for the 2024 Olympic Games in Paris.

World number 6, Wanderley Pereira was eliminated in the quarterfinals of the Paris Olympics when he faced Ukrainian Oleksandr Khyzhniak, third in the world ranking and Olympic runner-up. Khyzhniak went on to win the tournament.

At the 2025 World Boxing Championships, he won two fights, but lost in the quarterfinals against Yojerlin César.
