= Djibril Traoré =

Malian boxer

Personal information
- Nationality: Mali

Boxing career
Medal record
Men's amateur boxing
Representing Mali
African Championships
Bronze medal – third place	2024 Kinshasa	Middleweight
IBA World Championships
Bronze medal – third place	2025 Dubai	Middleweight

Djibril Traoré is a Malian boxer. He competed at the 2024 African Amateur Boxing Championships, winning the bronze medal in the middleweight event. He also competed at the 2025 IBA Men's World Boxing Championships, winning the bronze medal in the same event.
