= Paul Trainor =

Australian boxer

Personal information
- Nationality: Australia
- Born: 3 December 2001 (age 24) Sydney, Australia
- Height: 190 cm (6 ft 3 in)

Boxing career
- Weight class: 80 kg
Medal record
Men's amateur boxing
Representing Australia
Commonwealth Games
Bronze medal – third place	2026 Glasgow	80 kg

Paul Trainor (born 3 December 2001) is an Australian boxer. He competed at the 2026 Commonwealth Games, winning the bronze medal in the men's 80 kg event.
