= Yojerlin César =

French boxer

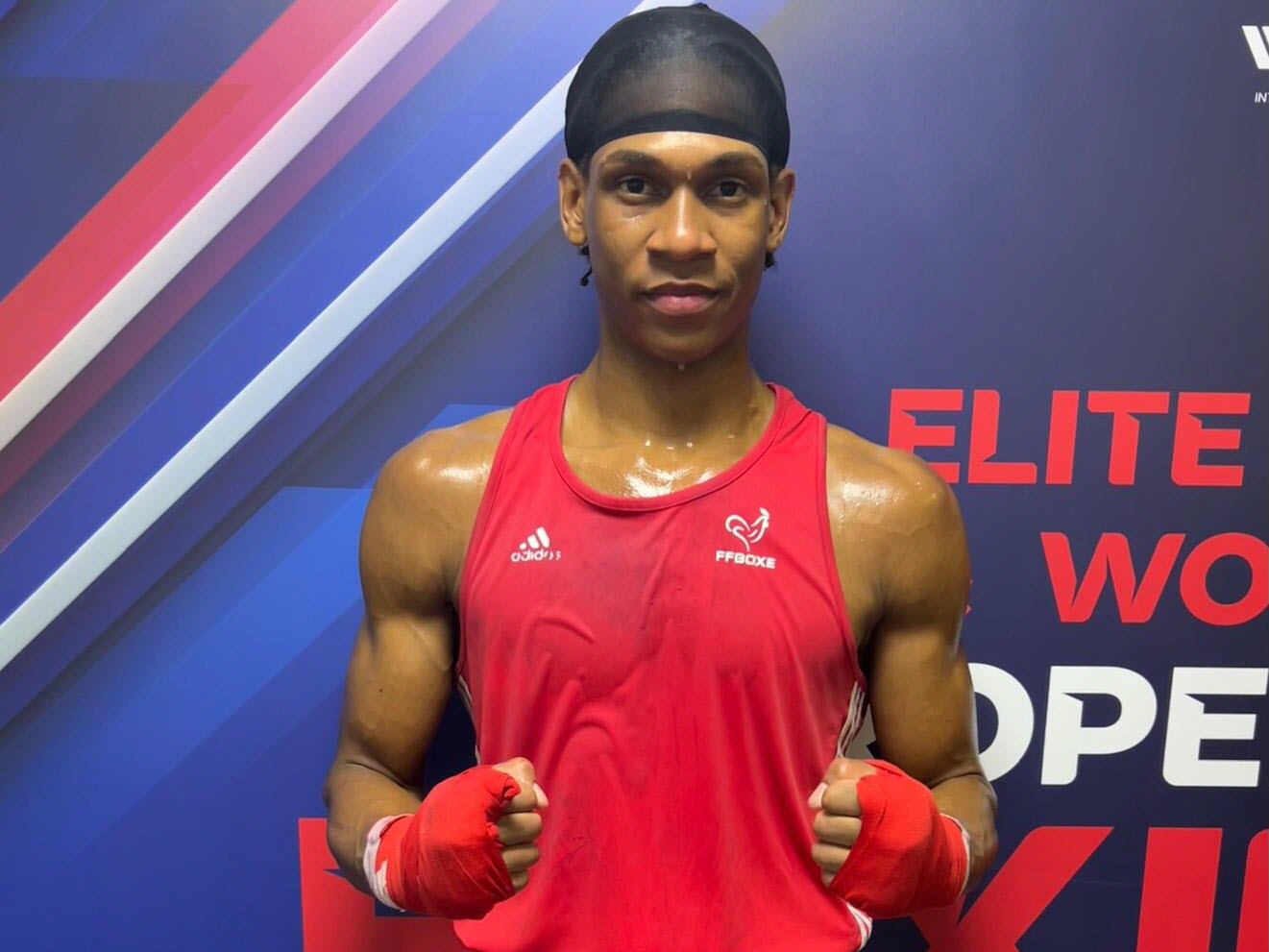

Personal information
- Nationality: France
- Born: 26 April 2004 (age 22)

Boxing career
Medal record
Men's amateur boxing
Representing France
World Championships
| Silver medal – second place | 2025 Liverpool | 80 kg |
European Championships
| Bronze medal – third place | 2024 Belgrade | Light heavyweight |

Yojerlin César (born 26 April 2004) is a French boxer. He competed at the 2024 European Amateur Boxing Championships, winning the bronze medal in the light heavyweight event. He also competed at the 2025 World Boxing Championships, winning the silver medal in the men's 80 kg event.
