= Syria at the 2022 Asian Games =

Syria at the multi-sports event

- IOC code: SYR
- NOC: Syrian Olympic Committee

in Hangzhou 19 September 2023 – 8 October 2023
- Competitors: 7 in 4 sports
- Flag bearer: Ahmad Ghousoon
- Medals Ranked 38th: Gold 0 Silver 0 Bronze 1 Total 1

Asian Games appearances (overview)
- 1951; 1954; 1958; 1962; 1966; 1970; 1974; 1978; 1982; 1986; 1990; 1994; 1998; 2002; 2006; 2010; 2014; 2018; 2022; 2026

Syria competed at the 2022 Asian Games in Hangzhou, Zhejiang, China, which was held from 23 September 2023 to 8 October 2023. The Syria national under-23 football team withdrew before matches started.

== Competitors ==
| Sport | Men | Women | Total |
|---|---|---|---|
| Athletics | 1 | 0 | 1 |
| Boxing | 2 | 0 | 2 |
| Equestrian | 2 | 0 | 2 |
| Wrestling | 2 | 0 | 2 |
| Total | 7 | 0 | 7 |

== Medalists ==
| Medal | Name | Sport | Event | Date |
|---|---|---|---|---|
| Bronze | Ahmad Ghousoon | Boxing | Men's 80 kg | 4 October |

Medals by sport
| Sport | 1st place, gold medalist(s) | 2nd place, silver medalist(s) | 3rd place, bronze medalist(s) | Total |
| Boxing | 0 | 0 | 1 | 1 |
