= Akmal Khasanov =

Uzbekistani boxer

Personal information
- Nationality: Uzbek
- Born: 28 November 1994 (age 31) Surxondaryo Region
- Height: 168 cm (5 ft 6 in)
- Weight: Lightweight

Boxing career

Akmal Khasanov (uzb: Akmal Xasanov, ru: Акмаль Хасанов born November 28, 1994, Termez, Surkhandaryo region, Uzbekistan) is a former Uzbek boxer of the middleweight category, champion of Uzbekistan, winner of international tournaments and coach of the national boxing team of Uzbekistan since 2018. Winner of the "Shuhrat" (Medal of Honor) (2023).

== Biography ==
Akmal Khasanov was born on November 20, 1994, in Termez, Surkhandarya region.

=== Boxing career ===
He started boxing when he was 15. Champion of Uzbekistan 2010–2014, winner of international competitions in Kazakhstan, Ukraine and Russia. 2009-2010 (1st place) Champion of Uzbekistan among boys and juniors 2011–2012, among adults 2013–2014. Akmal Khasanov ended his sports career in 2015 due to injury.

==== Coaching career ====
Akmal Khasanov started his boxing coaching career in 2018. Currently, the coach of the Uzbekistan national boxing team. Under his leadership, trained such World and Asian Championships medalists as Shokhjakhon Abdullaev and Javokhir Ummataliev, Abdullaev Alokhan and Paris 2024 Olympic gold medalist Asadkhuja Muydinkhujaev also Kyrgyz boxer Munarbek Seiitbek Uulu silver medalist of Paris-2024 Olympic games.

=== Paris-2024 Olympic Games ===
During the olympic games in Paris-2024, Kyrgyzstan boxing team arrived with just one coach to the games and they have asked from the neighbour country boxing team Uzbekistan to assist their boxer during the match in the corner. The kyrgyz boxer Munarbek Seiitbek Uulu with Akmal Khasanov reached final of Olympic games by guarentting medal for boxing for the first time in the history of Kyrgyzstan.

== Awards ==
- 2023 "Medal of Honor" (Uzbekistan)
- 2024 Chingis Aytmatov (Kyrgyzstan)
