= Ankush Panghal =

Indian boxer

Personal information
- Nationality: Indian
- Born: 13 August 2005 (age 21) Haryana, India

Sport
- Sport: Boxing
- Weight class: Light heavyweight
Medal record
Men's boxing
Representing India
World Boxing Cup
Silver medal – second place	2025 New Delhi	80 kg
Asian Games
Gold medal – first place	2026 Aichi-Nagoya	80 kg
Commonwealth Games
Gold medal – first place	2026 Glasgow	80 kg

Ankush Panghal (born 13 August 2005) is an Indian boxer who competes in the men's 80 kg category. He has won gold medals at the 2026 Commonwealth Games and 2026 Asian Games.

== Life and career ==
Ankush Panghal was born on 13 August 2005 in Haryana.

Panghal competed in the men's 80 kg category at the 2025 World Boxing Cup finals at New Delhi, where he won the silver medal after finishing runner-up to England's Oladimeji Shittu. In July 2026, he won the gold medal in the 80 kg category in the Grand Prix Usti nad Labem in Czechia.

Panghal represented India at the 2026 Commonwealth Games in Glasgow. He began his campaign with a win over Antigua and Barbuda's Zalaan Jan in the round of 16 before defeating Seychelles' Jade Micock in the quarter-finals. In the semi-finals, he defeated Canada's Joshua Ofori by unanimous decision to advance to the final. In the final, Panghal faced off against England's Dimeji Shittu. After trailing 0–5 at the end of the opening round, he came back to win the next two rounds and won the gold medal in the men's 80 kg event. At the 2026 Asian Games, he won the gold medal in the 80 kg category after defeating Kim Minseong of South Korea in the final.
