= Kaan Aykutsun =

Turkish boxer (born 2002)

Personal information
- Nationality: Turkish
- Born: 22 July 2002 (age 23) Ankara, Turkey
- Education: Sport coaching at Ankara Yıldırım Beyazıt University
- Height: 1.80 m (5 ft 11 in)

Sport
- Sport: Boxing
- Weight class: Light heavyweight
- Club: ASKİ Sports Club

Kaan Aykutsun (born 22 July 2002) is a Turkish Olympian boxer who competes in the light heavyweight(-80 kg) division.

== Early years in boxing ==
Aykutsun started boxing in 2008 at the age of six with the encouragement of his maternal and paternal uncles.

He competed in the 68 kg division at the 2016 European Schoolboys Championships held in Zagreb, Croatia, and won the bronze medal

== Sport career ==
The 1.80 m (5 ft 11 in) tall amateur boxer, is a member of the ASKİ Sports Club of the Ankara Metropolitan Municipality, and is coached by Levent Yaman.

As of 2024, he was eight times the Turkish champion.

=== 2021 ===
Aykutsun lost the second round match in the light heavyweight division at the 2021 AIBA World Championships in Belgrade, Serbia.

=== 2022 ===
In the light heavyweight (75-80 kg) event of the 202 European U222 Championships in Poreč, Croatia, he could not advance further from the quarterfinals.

He lost the quarterfinals match in the light heavyweight division at the 2022 Mediterranean Games in Oran, Algeria, and placed fifth.

=== 2023 ===
Aykutsun lost the Round of 16 match in the light heavyweight division at the 2023 IBA Men's World Championships in Tashkent, Uzbekistan.

He competed in the light heavyweight event of the 2023 European Games in Nowy Targ, Poland, and lost the Round of 32 match.

=== 2024 ===
Aykutsun competed in the −80 kg event at the 2024 World Boxing Olympic Qualification Tournament 1 in Busto Arsizio, Italy, and won a quota to represent his country in the 80 kg event at the 2024 Summer Olympics in Paris, France. He won the Round of 32, but lost the Round of 16 match against the 2016 Rio de Janeiro and 2020 Tokyo Olympic Games champion Arlen López from Cuba, and was so eliminated.

== Personal life ==
Kaan Aykutsun was born in Ankara, Turkey on 22 July 2002. He is a student of Sport coaching in the Faculty of Sport Science at the Ankara Yıldırım Beyazıt University.
