= Sumit Kundu =

Indian boxer (born 2003)

Personal information
- Born: November 1, 2002 (age 24) Dhakal, Jind, Haryana, India

Sport
- Sport: Boxing
Medal record
Men's amateur boxing
Representing India
Asian Championships
Bronze medal – third place	2022 Amman	75kg
World Cup
Bronze medal – third place	2025 Greater Noida	75kg

Sumit Kundu (born 2003) is an Indian boxer from Haryana. He is selected to represent India in the men's 70kg event at the 2026 Asian Games in September 2026. He defeated Thailand's Bunjong Sinsiri by a unanimous 5-0 decision in the opening round and entered the pre-quarters.

== Early life ==
Kundu was born on 1 November 2002 in Dhakal Village, Jind, Haryana, India. Kundu is from Haryana. He took up boxing in 2013, at the age of 10 but the same year his father died. His mother had to take up odd jobs including tailoring at night to run the family, so he left boxing and took up a security guard job at a school. He works in the Indian Army as a Havildar. He learnt his basics from his childhood coach Ved Prakash.

== Career ==
Encouraged by his mother, brothers and village elders, he returned to boxing and soon won gold medals at the 2018 National School Games and 2019 Khelo India Games.

In 2021, he reached the quarterfinals of the 2021 World Championship. He also won a gold medal in the 2021 Senior National Boxing Championships.

In 2022, he won a gold at the Thailand Open. He won a bronze medal at the 2022 Asian Elite Boxing Championships after defeating Thailand's Borworn Kadamduan by 3-2, before losing 0-5 to Uzbekistan's Saidjamshid Jafarov in the semifinal. In 2022, he also claimed an upset victory the World Championship silver medallist, Dzhambulat Bizhamov in the Strandja Memorial tournament. In the same year, he also represented India in the 2022 Commonwealth Games and the World Championships.

Later in 2023, he suffered an anterior cruciate ligament injury and missed the selections for the Paris Olympics in 2024 as he had to spend nearly 18 months in rehab. He returned in 2025. At the 2025 World Boxing Cup Finals in Greater Noida, Kundu secured a bronze medal after defeating South Korea's Kim Hyeon-tae by 5-0 in the quarterfinal. He lost to Poland's Michal Jarlinski in the semifinal. He did well in the selection trials for 2026 Asian Games.
