= Yoenlis Hernández =

Cuban boxer (born 1997)

Personal information
- Nickname: El Diablo
- Born: Yoenli Feliciano Hernandez Martinez; 30 June 1997 (age 29) Camagüey, Cuba
- Height: 6 ft 2 in (188 cm)
- Weight: Middleweight

Boxing career

Boxing record
- Total fights: 11
- Wins: 11
- Win by KO: 9
Medal record
Men's amateur boxing
Representing Cuba
IBA World Championships
Gold medal – first place	2021 Belgrade	Middleweight
Gold medal – first place	2023 Tashkent	Middleweight

Yoenlis Hernández is a Cuban professional boxer. He has held the WBO-NABO middleweight title since March 2026. As an amateur he was a two-time world champion.

== Amateur boxing career ==
Hernández competed at the 2021 AIBA World Boxing Championships, winning the gold medal in the middleweight event.

Two years later, at the 2023 IBA World Boxing Championships, he again won the middleweight gold medal to become a two-time world champion.

== Professional boxing career ==
In May 2023, Feliciano abandoned the Cuban delegation during a stopover in Panama. After going unbeaten in his first four professional fights, he signed a promotional deal with Dream Bigg Management in July 2024.

Hernández was scheduled to face Kyrone Davis in a super-middleweight bout at Michelob Ultra Arena in Las Vegas on 31 May 2025. He won by unanimous decision.

On 12 October 2025 at Seminole Hard Rock Hotel & Casino Hollywood in Hollywood, Florida, he defeated Ramon De La Cruz Sena via first-round technical knockout.

Hernández faced Terrell Gausha for the vacant WBO-NABO middleweight title at the MGM Grand Garden Arena in Las Vegas on 28 March 2026. He won by stoppage in the fourth round.

In his next fight at T-Mobile Arena in Paradise, Nevada, on 22 August 2026, he defeated Francisco Verón over 10 rounds via majority decision with two of the ringside judges scoring the bout 99–91 and 98–92 respectively in his favour, while the third had it a 95–95 draw.

== Professional boxing record ==
11 fights	11 wins	0 losses
By knockout	9	0
By decision	2	0

No.	Result	Record	Opponent	Type	Round, time	Date	Location	Notes
11	Win	11–0	Francisco Verón	MD	10	Aug 22, 2026	T-Mobile Arena, Paradise, Nevada, U.S.	
10	Win	10–0	Terrell Gausha	TKO	4 (10), 1:17	Mar 28, 2026	MGM Grand Garden Arena, Paradise, Nevada, U.S.	Won vacant WBO-NABO middleweight title
9	Win	9–0	Ramon De La Cruz Sena	TKO	1 (10), 2:59	Oct 12, 2025	Seminole Hard Rock Hotel & Casino, Hollywood, Florida, U.S.	
8	Win	8–0	Kyrone Davis	UD	10	May 31, 2025	Michelob Ultra Arena, Paradise, Nevada, U.S.	
7	Win	7–0	Angel Ruiz Astorga	KO	5 (10), 1:06	Feb 1, 2025	T-Mobile Arena, Paradise, Nevada, U.S.	
6	Win	6–0	Bryce Henry	TKO	8 (10), 1:53	Oct 11, 2024	Seminole Hard Rock Hotel & Casino, Hollywood, Florida, U.S.	
5	Win	5–0	Jose Sanchez Charles	TKO	2 (8), 1:45	Sep 14, 2024	T-Mobile Arena, Paradise, Nevada, U.S.	
4	Win	4–0	Alejandro Barrera	TKO	7 (10), 2:57	Jun 7, 2024	Seminole Hard Rock Hotel & Casino, Hollywood, Florida, U.S.	
3	Win	3–0	Alfredo Rodolfo Blanco	KO	1 (10), 0:23	Mar 22, 2024	Seminole Hard Rock Hotel & Casino, Hollywood, Florida, U.S.	
2	Win	2–0	Juan Sanchez Haro	TKO	7 (8), 0:37	Sep 9, 2022	Uruapan, Mexico	
1	Win	1–0	Juan Carlos Raygosa Perez	KO	3 (6), 1:13	May 20, 2022	Palenque De La FNSM, Aguascalientes, Mexico	
