= Gazimagomed Jalidov =

Spanish boxer (born 1995)

Personal information
- Nationality: Spanish
- Born: Gazimagomed Schamilovich Jalidov Gafurova; 16 March 1995 (age 31) Khasavyurt, Russia
- Weight: Light heavyweight

Boxing career
Medal record
Men's amateur boxing
Representing Spain
IBA World Championships
Bronze medal – third place	2023 Tashkent	Light heavyweight
Bronze medal – third place	2025 Dubai	Light heavyweight
Mediterranean Games
Bronze medal – third place	2022 Oran	Light heavyweight

Gazimagomed Schamilovich Jalidov Gafurova (Note: In this Spanish name, the first or paternal surname is Jalidov and the second or maternal family name is Gafurova.) (born 16 March 1995) is a Spanish boxer. He competed in the men's light heavyweight event at the 2020 Summer Olympics.

Born in Russia, he arrived in Spain in 2004.

== Professional boxing record ==
1 fight	1 win	0 losses
By knockout	1	0

No.	Result	Record	Opponent	Type	Round, time	Date	Location	Notes
1	Win	1–0	(Panama) Manuel Largacha	KO	1 (6) 3:00	8 October 2022	Pabellon Municipal, Villamediana de Iregua, Spain	
