= Aminiasi Saratibau =

Fijian boxer

Personal information
- Born: 10 June 1999 (age 27)
- Education: Tilak High School

Boxing career
- Country: Fiji
- Sport: Boxing
Medal record
Men's boxing
Representing Fiji
Pacific Games
Bronze medal – third place	2023 Honiara	Light heavyweight

Aminiasi Saratibau (born 10 June 1999) is a Fijian boxer. He competed in the men's 80 kg event at the 2025 World Boxing Championships.
