= Fazliddin Erkinboev =

Uzbek boxer

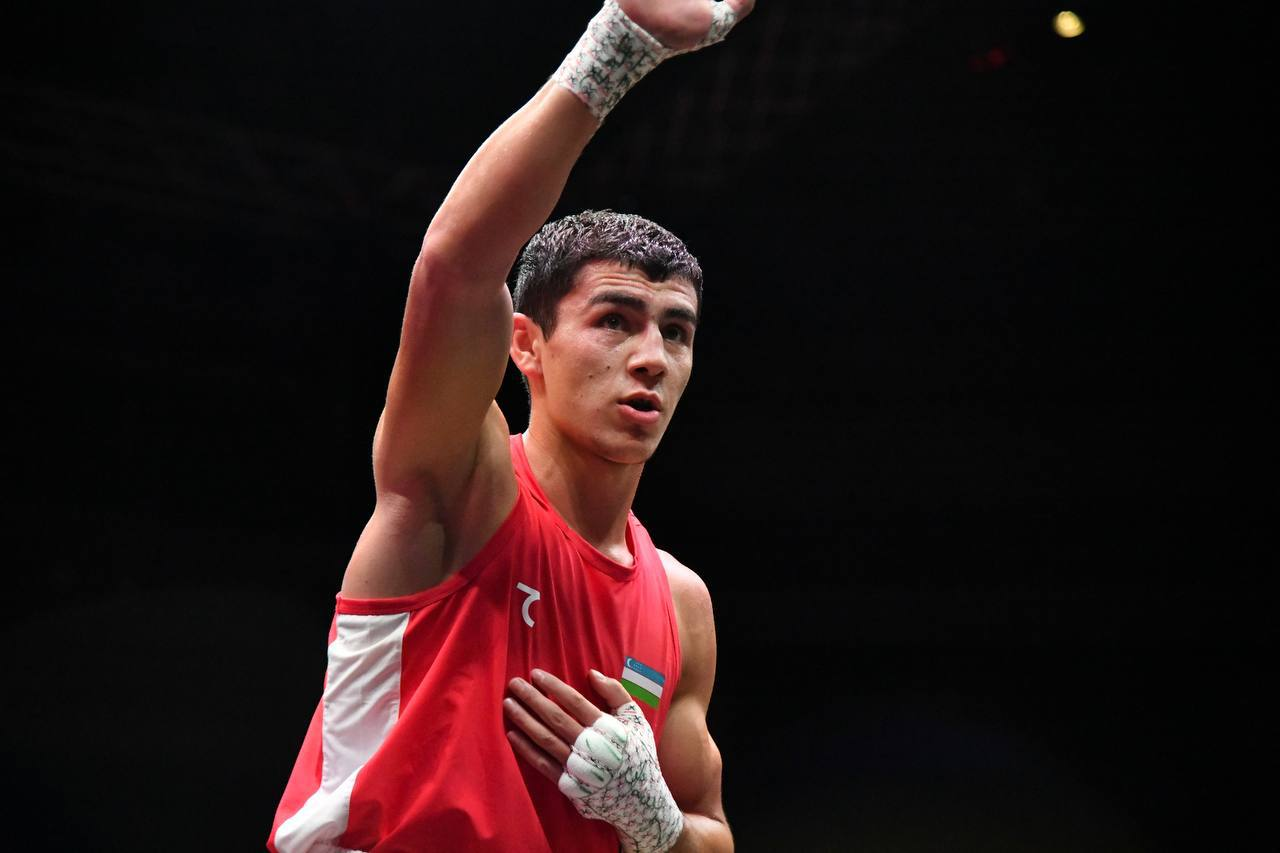
- Fazliddin Erkinboev

Personal information
- Nationality: Uzbekistan
- Height: 1.86 m (6 ft 1 in)

Boxing career
Medal record
Men's amateur boxing
Representing Uzbekistan
World Championships
Gold medal – first place	2025 Liverpool	75 kg
IBA World Championships
Bronze medal – third place	2025 Dubai	Middleweight
IBA Youth World Championships
Gold medal – first place	2022 La Nucia	Light middleweight
2022 Asian Youth & Junior Boxing Championships
Gold medal – first place	2022 Amman	Welterweight
World Boxing Cup
Gold medal – first place	2025 Foz do Iguaçu	70–75 kg
Asian Boxing Elite Boxing Championships
Gold medal – first place	2026 Ulaanbaatar	80 kg

Fazliddin Erkinboev is an Uzbek boxer. He competed at the 2025 World Boxing Championships, winning the gold medal in the men's 75 kg event. He also competed at the 2025 IBA Men's World Boxing Championships, winning the bronze medal in the middleweight event.
