= Nurbek Oralbay =

Kazakh boxer (born 2000)

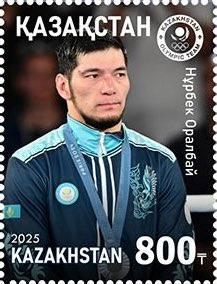
- Oralbay at the 2024 Olympic Games as depicted on a 2025 Kazakh stamp

Personal information
- Native name: Нұрбек Рахатұлы Оралбай
- Nationality: Kazakh
- Born: 11 June 2000 (age 26) Astana, Kazakhstan
- Height: 1.87 m (6 ft 2 in)
- Weight: Middleweight; Light heavyweight

Boxing career
- Stance: Orthodox
Medal record
Men's amateur boxing
Representing Kazakhstan
Olympic Games
Silver medal – second place	2024 Paris	Middleweight
World Amateur Championships
Gold medal – first place	2023 Tashkent	Light heavyweight
Asian Championships
Bronze medal – third place	2022 Amman	Light heavyweight
Youth World Championships
Gold medal – first place	2018 Budapest	Middleweight

Nurbek Rahatūly Oralbay (Kazakh: Нұрбек Рахатұлы Оралбай; born 11 June 2000) is a Kazakh amateur boxer. He won gold medal at the 2018 Youth World Championships in the middleweight division. In 2022, he won a bronze medal at the Asian Championships in Amman. At the World Boxing Championships in Tashkent, Uzbekistan, Oralbay competed in the 80 kg weight category. In the final match for the gold medal, he defeated Tuohetaerbieke Tanglatihan and became the world champion.

== 2024 Summer Olympics ==
At the 2024 Summer Olympics in Paris, he had his first fight against Australian Callum Peters. Oralbay won with a score of 3:2 and in the quarterfinals faced Azerbaijani boxer Murad Allahverdiyev, winning unanimously by the judges. In the semifinals, he competed against Dominican Cristian Pinales, winning with a score of 3:2 and advancing to the final. In the final, he lost to Ukrainian boxer Oleksandr Khyzhniak, earning a silver medal.

== Personal life ==
He is the twin brother of fellow boxer Aibek Oralbay.
