= Javokhir Ummataliev =

Uzbekistani boxer (born 2005)

Javokhir Ummataliyev
Personal information
- Full name: Javokhir Turobjon Ugli Ummataliyev
- Born: 26 February 2005 (age 21) Tashkent, Uzbekistan
- Height: 1.86 m (6 ft 1 in)
- Weight: Light-heavyweight

Boxing career
- Stance: Southpaw
Medal record
Men's amateur boxer
Representing Uzbekistan
World Championships
Gold medal – first place	2025 Liverpool	80 kg
IBA World Championships
Silver medal – second place	2025 Dubai	Light heavyweight
Asian Championships
Gold medal – first place	2024 Chiang Mai	Middleweight
CIS Games
Gold medal – first place	2023 CIS Games	Welterweight
Youth World Championships
Gold medal – first place	2022 La Nucia	Welterweight
Asian Youth Championships
Silver medal – second place	2022 Amman	Light welterweight

Javokhir Ummataliev (Uzbek: Javoxir Ummataliyev; Russian: Жавохир Умматалиев: born 26 February 2005 in Tashkent, Uzbekistan) is an Uzbekistani amateur boxer, who won a silver medal at the Youth Asian Championships 2022 held in Amman, Jordan and gold medalist of Asian Boxing Championship 2024 He also won a gold medal at the 2022 IBA Youth Men's & Women's World Boxing Championships held in La Nucia, Spain and Bulgaria – Strandja Cup (2024) He trains under the uzbekistani trainer Akmal Khasanov.

== Career ==
He began his international boxing career in August 2021, with a victory over Yashwardhan Singh at ASBC Asian Junior Boys & Girls Championships. In quarterfinals and semifinals defeated Mohammed Baker (5-0), Kazakh Madiyar Taipakov (4-1). He became Asian Champion at ASBC Asian Youth & Junior Boxing Championships 2021 by winning Orozboev Almaz (5-0).

=== 2022 IBA Youth World Boxing Championships results ===
Round of 16: Defeated Coulibaly Soucko Ganda (Spain) 5–0

Quarter-finals: Defeated Abdelmoneim Mohamed Hossam Aly (Egypt) 5–0

Semi-finals: Defeated Hakobyan Ares (Armenia) 5–0

Finals: Defeated Barnes Levi (England) 4-1
