= Tautuarii Nena =

French Polynesian boxer

Personal information
- Born: 1989 or 1990 (age 36–37)

Sport
- Country: French Polynesia
- Sport: Boxing
Medal record
Men's Boxing
Representing Tahiti
Pacific Games
Bronze medal – third place	2019 Apia	Light heavyweight
Silver medal – second place	2015 Port Moresby	Middleweight

Tautuarii Nena (born 1989 or 1990) is a French Polynesian boxer who has represented French Polynesia at the Pacific Games. He is the son of boxer and politician Tauhiti Nena and the grandson of boxer Maco Nena.

== Career ==
In 2011 while studying at Université Nice-Sophia-Antipolis he won the French university boxing championship in the under-75 kg category. In 2012 he came second in the under-81 kg category. In 2013 he was champion in the under-88 kg category. In 2014 he won again in the light heavyweight category.

At the 2015 Pacific Games in Port Moresby he won silver as a middleweight. At the 2019 Pacific Games in Apia he won bronze in the light heavyweight category.

In September 2025, Nena competed in the Elite Oceania Boxing Championships, securing a victory over Australia's Malakai Katene. In December 2025, he represented French Polynesia at the IBA Men's World Boxing Championships in the light heavyweight division. He won his opening match against Harassiya Waththe Rathnasiri of Sri Lanka on a 4:0 points decision.
