= Jancen Poutoa =

Samoan athlete

Sport
- Country: Samoa
- Sport: Boxing
Medal record
Men's Boxing
Representing Samoa
Pacific Games
Gold medal – first place	2019 Apia	Middleweight

Jancen Poutoa is a Samoan amateur boxer who has represented Samoa at the Pacific Games, Youth Olympic Games, and Commonwealth Games.

At the 2018 Summer Youth Olympics in Buenos Aires, Argentina he came 4th in the middleweight class after losing to Thailand's Weerapoon Jongjoho.

At the 2019 Pacific Games in Apia he won gold in the middleweight division. In March 2020 he lost his opening bout at the 2020 Asia & Oceania Boxing Olympic Qualification Tournament and so failed to qualify for the Tokyo Olympics.

On 14 July 2022 he was selected as part of Samoa's team for the 2022 Commonwealth Games in Birmingham.
