= Artem Ageev =

Serbian boxer (born 1992)

Personal information
- Nationality: Serbia; Russia
- Born: Artem Ageev; 24 January 1992 (age 34) Serpukhov, Russia
- Height: 5 ft 11.5 in (1.82 m)

Sport
- Country: Serbia
- Sport: Boxing
- Weight class: Light heavyweight
Medal record
Men's amateur boxing
Representing Serbia
European Championships
Gold medal – first place	2022 Yerevan	Light heavyweight

Artem Ageev (Serbian Cyrillic: Артјом Агејев, Russian: Артём Валерьевич Агеев; born 24 January 1992 in Serpukhov, Russia) is a Russian-born Serbian boxer. He competed at the 2022 European Amateur Boxing Championships, winning the gold medal in the light heavyweight event. Ageev and Vahid Abasov were the only people to win medals which were gold medals for their country. He was the second person of his country to win the medal.
