= Murad Allahverdiyev =

Azerbaijani boxer (born 2002)

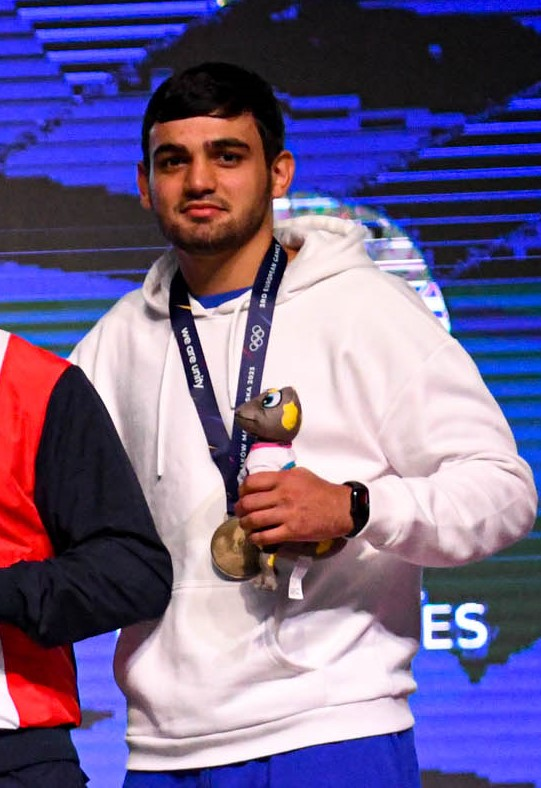
- Allahverdiyev in 2023

Personal information
- Nationality: Azerbaijan
- Born: 29 August 2002 (age 23)

Boxing career
Medal record
Men's amateur boxing
Representing Azerbaijan
European Games
Bronze medal – third place	2023 Kraków-Małopolska	Light heavyweight
European U23 Championships
Silver medal – second place	2024 Sofia	Light Heavyweight

Murad Allahverdiyev (born 29 August 2002) is an Azerbaijani boxer. He competed at the 2023 European Games, winning the bronze medal in the men's light heavyweight event. He also competed at the 2024 Summer Olympics in the men's 80 kg event, but was defeated in the quarter-final by Nurbek Oralbay.
