= Gabrijel Veočić =

Croatian boxer (born 2001)

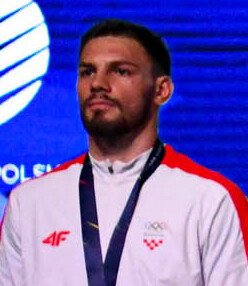
- Veočić in 2023

Personal information
- Nationality: Croatia
- Born: 1 June 2001 (age 25) Slavonski Brod, Croatia

Boxing career
Medal record
Men's amateur boxing
Representing Croatia
World Championships
Bronze medal – third place	2025 Liverpool	80 kg
European Championships
Gold medal – first place	2024 Belgrade	Light heavyweight
European Games
Silver medal – second place	2023 Kraków-Małopolska	Light heavyweight

Gabrijel Veočić (born 1 June 2001) is a Croatian boxer. He competed at the 2024 European Amateur Boxing Championships, winning the gold medal in the light heavyweight event. He also competed at the 2024 Summer Olympics in the men's 80 kg event, but was defeated in the quarter-final by Christian Javier Pinales.
