= Callum Peters =

Australian boxer (born 2002)

Personal information
- Nickname: 50 Cal
- Nationality: Australian
- Born: 25 November 2002 (age 23) Adelaide, Australia
- Height: 1.82 m (6 ft 0 in)
- Weight: Middleweight

Boxing career

Boxing record
- Total fights: 10
- Wins: 10
- Win by KO: 8
- Losses: 0
Medal record
Men's amateur boxing
Representing Australia
Commonwealth Games
Silver medal – second place	2022 Birmingham	Middleweight

Callum Peters (born 25 November 2002) is an Australian professional boxer. As of November 2026, he is world ranked #15 by the International Boxing Federation (IBF) in the middleweight division.

== Early life ==
Peters was born in Adelaide, South Australia into a family of Indigenous Australian descent. He began boxing at the age of 9 and quickly became an outstanding junior prospect.

== Amateur career ==
As an amateur, Peters won a silver medal in the men's middleweight event at the 2022 Commonwealth Games at 19 years of age. He competed in the men's middleweight event at the 2024 Summer Olympics and narrowly lost a controversial 3-2 split decision to the eventual silver medalist Nurbek Oralbay in the round of 16. Peters was the no.1 world ranked middleweight for several years while competing on the amateur circuit.

== Professional career ==
Peters began his professional boxing career in December 2024 and defeated Mitch Holden via first round TKO after 59 seconds at The Star Event Centre in Sydney. In December 2026, he is scheduled to face Mexican Saulo Saldivar on the Tim Tszyu vs. Erislandy Lara undercard at Cbus Super Stadium on the Gold Coast.

== Professional boxing record ==
10 fights	10 wins	0 losses
By knockout	8	0
By decision	2	0

No.	Result	Record	Opponent	Type	Round, time	Date	Location	Notes
10	Win	10-0	Juan Diego Ortiz	UD	10	6 Nov 2026	TikTok Entertainment Centre, Sydney, Australia	
9	Win	9-0	Blake Wells	TKO	8 (10), 2:03	26 Aug 2026	Convention and Exhibition Centre, Gold Coast, Australia	Won the IBF Pan Pacific middleweight title
8	Win	8-0	Ivan Ricardo Actis	TKO	7 (10), 0:55	26 Jul 2026	Afterpay Arena, Sydney, Australia	
7	Win	7-0	Joeshon James	UD	10	6 May 2026	Newcastle Entertainment Centre, Newcastle, Australia	
6	Win	6-0	Delio Anzaqeci Mouzinho	TKO	2 (8), 0:57	5 Apr 2026	WIN Entertainment Centre, Wollongong, Australia	
5	Win	5-0	Cody Beekin	TKO	6 (10), 2:05	17 Dec 2025	TikTok Entertainment Centre, Sydney, Australia	Won vacant Australian middleweight title
4	Win	4-0	Marcus Heywood	TKO	1 (6)	30 Jul 2025	Brisbane Powerhouse, Brisbane, Australia	
3	Win	3-0	Luca Lanigan	TKO	1 (6)	25 Jun 2025	Convention Centre, Cairns, Australia	
2	Win	2-0	William Lenehan	TKO	1 (4) 2:22	6 Apr 2025	Newcastle Entertainment Centre, Newcastle, Australia	
1	Win	1-0	Mitch Holden	TKO	1 (6) 0:59	13 Dec 2024	The Star Event Centre, Sydney, Australia	

== Recognition ==
- 2026 - National Aboriginal and Torres Strait Islander Sports Awards - National Sportsperson of the Year
