= Cristian Pinales =

Dominican Republic boxer

Medal record

Men's amateur boxing

Representing Dominican Republic

Olympic Games
Bronze medal – third place	2024 Paris	Middleweight

Bolivarian Games
Gold medal – first place	2022 Valledupar	Light heavyweight

Cristian Javier Pinales (born 2 November 2000 in La Romana, Dominican Republic) is a Dominican boxer. He qualified for the 2024 Summer Olympics, reaching the semifinals after defeating Tuohetaerbieke Tanglatihan and then Gabrijel Veočić. However, he lost to Nurbek Oralbay from Kazakhstan in the semifinals, earning a bronze medal.
