= Sabirzhan Akkalykov =

Kazakh boxer (born 2002)

Sabirzhan Akkalykov Сабыржан Аққалықов
Personal information
- Nationality: Kazakh
- Born: 2002 (age 23–24) Karaganda, Karagandy, Kazakhstan
- Weight: Light welterweight

Boxing career
Medal record
Men's amateur boxing
Representing Kazakhstan
IBA World Championships
Silver medal – second place	2025 Dubai	Middleweight
Youth World Championships
Gold medal – first place	2021 Kielce	Light welterweight

Sabirzhan Akkalykov (Kazakh: Сабыржан Аққалықов; born 2002) is a Kazakh amateur boxer who won gold medal at the 2021 Youth World Championships in the light welterweight division.
