= Rami Kiwan =

Bulgarian boxer (born 2000)

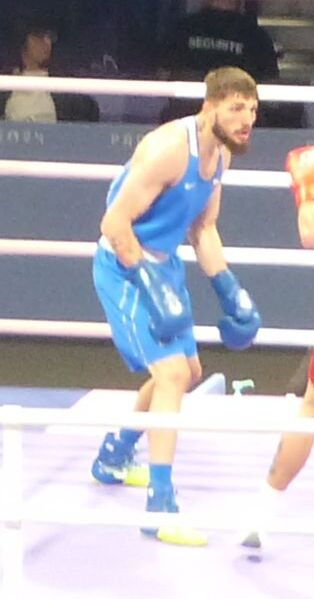
- Kiwan in 2024

Personal information
- Nationality: Bulgaria
- Born: Rami Mofid Kiwan; 3 June 2000 (age 26) Sofia, Bulgaria
- Height: 185 cm (6f 2in)

Boxing career
- Weight class: Middleweight
- Stance: orthodox
Medal record
Men's amateur boxing
Representing Bulgaria
World Championships
Silver medal – second place	2025 Liverpool	75 kg
EUBC European Championships
Gold medal – first place	2024 Belgrade	Middleweight
European Boxing Championships
Bronze medal – third place	2026 Sofia	75 kg

Rami Mofid Kiwan (Bulgarian: Рами Мофид Киуан; born 3 June 2000) is a Bulgarian boxer. He competed at the 2024 European Amateur Boxing Championships, winning the gold medal in the middleweight event. He also competed at the 2024 Summer Olympics in the men's 71 kg event, but was defeated in the quarter-final by Omari Jones.
