= Tuohetaerbieke Tanglatihan =

Chinese boxer (born 1996)

Personal information
- Nationality: Chinese
- Born: 18 November 1996 (age 29) Altay City, Altay Prefecture, Xinjiang, China
- Height: 188 cm (6 ft 2 in)
- Weight: Middleweight

Boxing career
- Stance: Orthodox
Medal record
Men's Amateur Boxing
Representing China
World Amateur Championships
Silver medal – second place	2023 Tashkent	Light heavyweight
Asian Games
Gold medal – first place	2022 Hangzhou	Light heavyweight

Tuohetaerbieke Tanglatihan (Chinese: 托合塔尔别克·唐拉提汗, Kazakh: Тоқтарбек Таңатқан, romanized: Toqtarbek Tañatqan; born 18 November 1996) is a Chinese boxer. He competed in the men's middleweight event at the 2020 Summer Olympics. He also competed in the men's middleweight event at the 2024 Summer Olympics.

Tanglatihan was born to Kazakh parents.
