= Saidjamshid Jafarov =

Uzbekistani boxer (born 1999)

Personal information
- Born: 16 January 1999 (age 27) Bukhara, Uzbekistan
- Height: 181 cm (5 ft 11 in)
- Weight: Middleweight

Boxing career
- Stance: Southpaw
Medal record
Men's amateur boxing
Representing Azerbaijan
World Championships
Bronze medal – third place	2025 Liverpool	Middleweight
European Boxing Championships
Gold medal – first place	2026 Sofia	75 kg
Islamic Solidarity Games
Gold medal – first place	2025 Riyadh	80 kg
Representing Uzbekistan
IBA World Championships
Silver medal – second place	2023 Tashkent	Light middleweight
Asian Championships
Gold medal – first place	2021 Dubai	Middleweight
Gold medal – first place	2022 Amman	Middleweight

Saidjamshid Jafarov (born 16 January 1999) is an Uzbek-Azerbaijani amateur boxer. He is a double Asian Champion as a middleweight.

== Amateur boxing career ==
=== Asian championships ===
Jafarov took part in the 2022 Asian Amateur Boxing Championships, held in November 2022 in Amman, Jordan. He retained his middleweight (75 kg) title after delivering heavy punches and sharp jabs over Kazakhstan's Nurkanat Raiys for a 5-0 romp.

=== World Cup ===
On April 26, 2026, at the World Cup in Foz do Iguaçu, Brazil, Saidjamshed Jafarov defeated Tauan Silva with a score of 5:0 and won the gold medal.

=== European Championship ===
In September 2026, at the European Championship in Sofia, he defeated Ismail Mutsolgov in the final by a score of 5:0 and won the gold medal.
