= Pylyp Akilov =

Ukrainian-born Hungarian boxer

Personal information
- Nationality: Hungary
- Born: 13 July 1999 (age 26) Soledar, Ukraine

Boxing career
Medal record
Men's amateur boxing
Representing Hungary
World Championships
Bronze medal – third place	2025 Liverpool	80 kg

Pylyp Akilov (born 13 July 1999) is a Ukrainian-born Hungarian boxer. He competed at the 2025 World Boxing Championships, winning the bronze medal in the men's 80 kg event.
