= 2023 IBA World Boxing Championships – Minimumweight =

Minimumweight at the 2023 IBA World Boxing Championships
- Venue: Humo Arena
- Location: Tashkent, Uzbekistan
- Dates: 4–14 May
- Competitors: 26 from 26 nations

Medalists
gold medal	Sanzhar Tashkenbay	Kazakhstan
silver medal	Sakhil Alakhverdovi	Georgia
bronze medal	Alejandro Claro	Cuba
bronze medal	Edmond Khudoyan	Russia

The combined competition at the 2023 IBA Men's World Boxing Championships was held between 4 and 14 May 2023.

== Results ==
=== Finals ===
Semifinals
(Georgia (country)) Sakhil Alakhverdovi	w/o
(Cuba) Alejandro Claro
(Kazakhstan) Sanzhar Tashkenbay	5
(Russia) Edmond Khudoian	0

Final
(Georgia (country)) Sakhil Alakhverdovi	0
(Kazakhstan) Sanzhar Tashkenbay	5

=== Top half ===
==== Section 1 ====
Round of 32
(India) Govind Kumar Sahani	5
(Tajikistan) Mehron Shafiev	0
(Turkmenistan) Daýanç Annaseýidow	0
(Kyrgyzstan) Anvarzhan Khodzhiev	5
(Botswana) Kobamelo Molatlhegi	0
(Bulgaria) Ergyunal Sebahtin	5

Round of 16
(Georgia (country)) Sakhil Alakhverdovi	5
(India) Govind Kumar Sahani	0
(Kyrgyzstan) Anvarzhan Khodzhiev	1
(Bulgaria) Ergyunal Sebahtin	4

Quarterfinals
(Georgia (country)) Sakhil Alakhverdovi	5
(Bulgaria) Ergyunal Sebahtin	0

==== Section 2 ====
Round of 32
(Cuba) Alejandro Claro	4
(Armenia) Baregham Harutyunyan	0
(Scotland) Aqeel Ahmed	4
(Guatemala) Hansel López	3

Round of 16
(Mozambique) Yassine Issufo	0
(Cuba) Alejandro Claro	5
(Scotland) Aqeel Ahmed	4
(Belarus) Yauheni Karmilchyk	1

Quarterfinals
(Cuba) Alejandro Claro	5
(Scotland) Aqeel Ahmed	0

=== Bottom half ===
==== Section 3 ====
Round of 32
(Dominican Republic) Junior Alcántara	5
(Kenya) Abednego Kyalo	0
(Nepal) Rabin Thapa	0
(Uzbekistan) Shodiyorjon Melikuziev	5

Round of 16
(Japan) Kazuma Aratake	5
(Dominican Republic) Junior Alcántara	0
(Uzbekistan) Shodiyorjon Melikuziev	1
(Kazakhstan) Sanzhar Tashkenbay	4

Quarterfinals
(Japan) Kazuma Aratake	0
(Kazakhstan) Sanzhar Tashkenbay	5

==== Section 4 ====
Round of 32
(Mongolia) Gankhuyagiin Gan-Erdene	1
(Morocco) Hamza Essaadi	4
(Russia) Edmond Khudoian	5
(Turkey) Nurullah Oyan	0
(Trinidad and Tobago) Ortega Jokhu	1
(Azerbaijan) Tural Sariyev	4

Round of 16
(Morocco) Hamza Essaadi	0
(Russia) Edmond Khudoian	5
(Azerbaijan) Tural Sariyev	1
(Thailand) Wuttichai Yurachai	4

Quarterfinals
(Russia) Edmond Khudoian	5
(Thailand) Wuttichai Yurachai	0
