= Boxing at the 2023 European Games – Men's flyweight =

Men's flyweight boxing at the 2023 European Games
- Venue: Nowy Targ Arena
- Location: Nowy Targ, Poland
- Dates: 24 June – 1 July
- Competitors: 20 from 20 nations

Medalists
gold medal	Billal Bennama	France
silver medal	Samet Gümüş	Turkey
bronze medal	Kiaran MacDonald	Great Britain
bronze medal	Federico Serra	Italy

The men's flyweight boxing event at the 2023 European Games was held between 24 June and 1 July 2023.

== Results ==
=== Finals ===
Semi-finals
Kiaran MacDonald (GBR)	0
Billal Bennama (FRA)	5
Samet Gümüş (TUR)	4
Federico Serra (ITA)	1

Final
Billal Bennama (FRA)	4
Samet Gümüş (TUR)	1

=== Top half ===
==== Section 1 ====
Round of 32
Salah Ibrahim (GER)	5
Allan Morozov (EST)	0

Round of 16
Kiaran MacDonald (GBR)	5
Salah Ibrahim (GER)	0
Leon Vranješ (BIH)
Omer Ametović (SRB)	RSC

Quarterfinals
Kiaran MacDonald (GBR)	5
Omer Ametović (SRB)	0

==== Section 2 ====
Round of 32
Billal Bennama (FRA)	5
Sakhil Alakhverdovi (GEO)	0

Round of 16
Daniel Asenov (BUL)	2
Jakub Słomiński (POL)	3
Billal Bennama (FRA)	5
Bashkim Bajoku (KOS)	0

Quarterfinals
Jakub Słomiński (POL)	DSQ
Billal Bennama (FRA)

=== Bottom half ===
==== Section 3 ====
Round of 32
Dumitru Vieru (MDA)
Martín Molina (ESP)	RSC

Round of 16
Seán Mari (IRL)	0
Martín Molina (ESP)	5
Samet Gümüş (TUR)	3
Dmytro Zamotayev (UKR)	1

Quarterfinals
Martín Molina (ESP)	0
Samet Gümüş (TUR)	5

==== Section 4 ====
Round of 32
Attila Bernáth (HUN)	4
David Alaverdian (ISR)	1

Round of 16
Federico Serra (ITA)	5
Rudolf Garboyan (ARM)	0
Attila Bernáth (HUN)	5
Masud Yusifzada (AZE)	0

Quarterfinals
Federico Serra (ITA)	5
Attila Bernáth (HUN)	0
