= Boxing at the 2018 Asian Games – Men's 49 kg =

Boxing competitions

Men's 49 kg at the 2018 Asian Games
- Venue: Jakarta International Expo
- Date: 25 August – 1 September 2018
- Competitors: 23 from 23 nations

Medalists
gold medal	Amit Panghal	India
silver medal	Hasanboy Dusmatov	Uzbekistan
bronze medal	Wu Zhonglin	China
bronze medal	Carlo Paalam	Philippines

The men's light flyweight (49 kilograms) event at the 2018 Asian Games took place from 25 August to 1 September 2018 at Jakarta International Expo Hall, Jakarta, Indonesia.

== Schedule ==
All times are Western Indonesia Time (UTC+07:00)

Date	Time	Event
Saturday, 25 August 2018	13:00	Round of 32
Monday, 27 August 2018	13:00	Round of 16
Wednesday, 29 August 2018	13:00	Quarterfinals
Friday, 31 August 2018	18:00	Semifinals
Saturday, 1 September 2018	14:00	Final

== Results ==
Legend

- RSC — Won by referee stop contest

=== Final ===
Final
Hasanboy Dusmatov (UZB)	2
Amit Panghal (IND)	3

=== Top half ===
Round of 32
Khamphouvanh Khamsathone (LAO)	3
Tej Bahadur Deuba (NEP)	1
Thiwanka Ranasinghe (SRI)	0
Mario Blasius Kali (INA)	5
Wuttichai Yurachai (THA)	5
Mohd Fuad Redzuan (MAS)	0

Round of 16
Hasanboy Dusmatov (UZB)	5
Khamphouvanh Khamsathone (LAO)	0
Mirlan Turkbai Uulu (KGZ)	RSC
Hasan Ali (IRQ)
José Barreto da Silva (TLS)	0
Mario Blasius Kali (INA)	5
Wuttichai Yurachai (THA)	0
Wu Zhonglin (CHN)	5

Quarterfinals
Hasanboy Dusmatov (UZB)	5
Mirlan Turkbai Uulu (KGZ)	0
Mario Blasius Kali (INA)	0
Wu Zhonglin (CHN)	5

Semifinals
Hasanboy Dusmatov (UZB)	5
Wu Zhonglin (CHN)	0

=== Bottom half ===
Round of 32
Tomoya Tsuboi (JPN)	5
Tashi Wangdi (BHU)	0
Tu Po-wei (TPE)	4
Abdulhaeem Mohibullah (PAK)	1
Omid Ahmadi Safa (IRI)	5
Jabar Meýleýew (TKM)	0
Kharkhüügiin Enkhmandakh (MGL)	3
Shin Jong-hun (KOR)	0

Round of 16
Temirtas Zhussupov (KAZ)	3
Tomoya Tsuboi (JPN)	2
Tu Po-wei (TPE)	0
Carlo Paalam (PHI)	5
Kim Jang-ryong (PRK)	3
Omid Ahmadi Safa (IRI)	2
Kharkhüügiin Enkhmandakh (MGL)	0
Amit Panghal (IND)	5

Quarterfinals
Temirtas Zhussupov (KAZ)	1
Carlo Paalam (PHI)	4
Kim Jang-ryong (PRK)	0
Amit Panghal (IND)	5

Semifinals
Carlo Paalam (PHI)	2
Amit Panghal (IND)	3
