= Orazbek Assylkulov =

Kazakhstani boxer (born 1996)

Personal information
- Born: 30 November 1996 (age 29) Kokshetau, Kazakhstan
- Weight: Featherweight; Lightweight

Boxing career
Medal record
Men's amateur boxing
Representing Kazakhstan
IBA World Championships
Gold medal – first place	2025 Dubai	Featherweight
Asian Championships
Gold medal – first place	2026 Ulaanbaatar	Lightweight
Silver medal – second place	2024 Chiang Mai	Featherweight

Orazbek Assylkulov (Kazakh: Оразбек Асылқұлов; born 30 December 1996) is a Kazakhstani boxer. As an amateur, he won a gold medal at the 2025 IBA Men's World Boxing Championships and two medals at the Asian Amateur Boxing Championships.

== Early life ==
Assylkulov was born on 30 December 1996 in Kokshetau. He took up boxing at the age of 10.

== Amateur career ==
In November 2018, Assylkulov competed in the 56 kg category of the national championships and won the silver medal, losing to Kairat Yeraliyev. In December 2021, he competed in the 57 kg category of the national championships and won the gold medal. He returned to the national championships the following year, where he won the silver medal in the same category.

At the 2024 Asian Amateur Boxing Championships, Assylkulov competed in the featherweight division where he reached the gold medal bout, losing to Mirazizbek Mirzakhalilov in the final.

Assylkulov competed in the featherweight division of the 2025 IBA Men's World Boxing Championships. He defeated Elisandro Sanches da Silva in the round of 32 and Mukelo Dlamini in the following round, the latter by knockout. He then defeated Carlos Martínez Bernad in the quarterfinal and Andrei Peglivanian in the semifinals. In the gold medal match, he defeated Khusravkhon Rakhimov.

At the 2026 Asian Amateur Boxing Championships, Assylkulov competed in the 60 kg (lightweight) division and won the gold medal, defeating Sachin Siwach in the final.
