= 2025 IBA World Boxing Championships – Light welterweight =

Light welterweight at the 2025 IBA World Boxing Championships
- Venue: Dubai Duty Free Tennis Stadium
- Location: Dubai, United Arab Emirates
- Dates: 4–13 December
- Competitors: 38

Medalists
gold medal	Ilya Popov	Russia
silver medal	Omar Livaza	Kyrgyzstan
bronze medal	Emmanuel Katema	Zambia
bronze medal	Yertugan Zeinulinov	Kazakhstan

The Light welterweight competition at the 2025 IBA Men's World Boxing Championships was held from 4 to 13 December 2025.

== Results ==
=== Finals ===
Semifinals
(Zambia) Emmanuel Katema	0
(Kyrgyzstan) Omar Livaza	5
(Russia) Ilya Popov	4
(Kazakhstan) Yertugan Zeinulinov	3

Final
(Kyrgyzstan) Omar Livaza	0
(Russia) Ilya Popov	5

=== Top half ===
==== Section 1 ====
Round of 64
(Greece) Stelios Kirsanidis	5
(Eswatini) Thabiso Dlamini	0

Round of 32
(Zambia) Emmanuel Katema	5
(Greece) Stelios Kirsanidis	0
(Brazil) Charles Davidson Rodrigues	5
(Ethiopia) Serawit Tsega Hailu	0
(Serbia) Pavel Fedorov	5
(Uganda) Farahat Manilola	0
(Kenya) Caleb Wandera	2
(Argentina) Lucas Villalba	5

Round of 16
(Zambia) Emmanuel Katema	KO
(Brazil) Charles Davidson Rodrigues
(Serbia) Pavel Fedorov	5
(Argentina) Lucas Villalba	0

Quarterfinals
(Zambia) Emmanuel Katema	RSC
(Serbia) Pavel Fedorov

==== Section 2 ====
Round of 64
(Zimbabwe) Nyongoloza Ntandoyenkosi	0
(Rwanda) Pacifique Niyonzima	5
(Palestine) Anas Sleiman
(Uzbekistan) Sayat Ilyasov	RSC

Round of 32
(Azerbaijan) Maksud Khasmetov	KO
(Rwanda) Pacifique Niyonzima
(Moldova) Vladislav Vaskovskyi	3
(Tajikistan) Ruslan Gafurov	4
(Armenia) Narek Hovhannisyan	4
(India) Shubham Kapil	1
(Uzbekistan) Sayat Ilyasov	0
(Kyrgyzstan) Omar Livaza	5

Round of 16
(Azerbaijan) Maksud Khasmetov	5
(Tajikistan) Ruslan Gafurov	0
(Armenia) Narek Hovhannisyan	2
(Kyrgyzstan) Omar Livaza	5

Quarterfinals
(Azerbaijan) Maksud Khasmetov	1
(Kyrgyzstan) Omar Livaza	4

=== Bottom half ===
==== Section 3 ====
Round of 64
(Democratic Republic of the Congo) Fiston Mbaya Mulumba	0
(Russia) Ilya Popov	5
(Ecuador) Matías Arosemena
(Czech Republic) David Karbaš	RSC

Round of 32
(Spain) Oier Ibarretxe	1
(Russia) Ilya Popov	4
(Libya) Yazin Al-Huwayj	4
(South Africa) Sinezelwe Mbatha	1
(Puerto Rico) Juliam Ortiz	5
(Cape Verde) Admilson Carvalho	0
(Czech Republic) David Karbaš	0
(Albania) Ani Haxhillari	5

Round of 16
(Russia) Ilya Popov	5
(Libya) Yazin Al-Huwayj	0
(Puerto Rico) Juliam Ortiz	5
(Albania) Ani Haxhillari	0

Quarterfinals
(Russia) Ilya Popov	5
(Puerto Rico) Juliam Ortiz	2

==== Section 4 ====
Round of 64
(Mongolia) Altangereliin Davaadalai	4
(Australia) Mitchell Lederman	1

Round of 32
(Papua New Guinea) John Ume	DSQ
(Tunisia) Firas Tabii
(Philippines) Jerald Into	1
(Israel) Ahmad Shtiwi	4
José Manuel Aguirre	WO
Joel Flores
(Mongolia) Altangereliin Davaadalai	0
(Kazakhstan) Yertugan Zeinulinov	5

Round of 16
(Papua New Guinea) John Ume	0
(Israel) Ahmad Shtiwi	5
José Manuel Aguirre	0
(Kazakhstan) Yertugan Zeinulinov	5

Quarterfinals
(Israel) Ahmad Shtiwi	0
(Kazakhstan) Yertugan Zeinulinov	5
