= 2025 IBA World Boxing Championships – Flyweight =

Flyweight at the 2025 IBA World Boxing Championships
- Venue: Dubai Duty Free Tennis Stadium
- Location: Dubai, United Arab Emirates
- Dates: 6–13 December
- Competitors: 27

Medalists
gold medal	Hasanboy Dusmatov	Uzbekistan
silver medal	Bair Batlaev	Russia
bronze medal	Rudolf Garboyan	Armenia
bronze medal	Patrick Chinyemba	Zambia

The Flyweight competition at the 2025 IBA Men's World Boxing Championships was held from 6 to 13 December 2025.

== Results ==
=== Finals ===
Semifinals
(Uzbekistan) Hasanboy Dusmatov	5
(Armenia) Rudolf Garboyan	0
(Russia) Bair Batlaev	5
(Zambia) Patrick Chinyemba	0

Final
(Uzbekistan) Hasanboy Dusmatov	4
(Russia) Bair Batlaev	1

=== Top half ===
==== Section 1 ====
Round of 32
(Argentina) Guillermo Freire	0
(Turkey) Samet Gümüş	5
(Tajikistan) Meroj Sufijonov	5
(Nepal) Funglang Kambang	0
(Kyrgyzstan) Mirlan Turkbai Uulu	5
(India) Ashu Mani Ram	0

Round of 16
(Uzbekistan) Hasanboy Dusmatov	5
(Turkey) Samet Gümüş	0
(Tajikistan) Meroj Sufijonov	5
(Kyrgyzstan) Mirlan Turkbai Uulu	0

Quarterfinals
(Uzbekistan) Hasanboy Dusmatov	4
(Tajikistan) Meroj Sufijonov	1

==== Section 2 ====
Round of 32
(Ethiopia) Yabsra Tadele Zeleke	0
(Portugal) Arménio Reis	5
(Cuba) Giovis Salfrán	4
(Azerbaijan) Nijat Huseynov	3

Round of 16
(Armenia) Rudolf Garboyan	5
(Portugal) Arménio Reis	0
(Cuba) Giovis Salfrán	RSC
(Spain) Martín Molina

Quarterfinals
(Armenia) Rudolf Garboyan	5
(Cuba) Giovis Salfrán	0

=== Bottom half ===
==== Section 3 ====
Round of 32
(Sri Lanka) Pasindu Godakandalage	1
(Thailand) Phanuwat Punnakorn	4
(French Polynesia) Nikee Cummings	4
(Botswana) Ribbin Modise	1
(Russia) Bair Batlaev	KO
(Bolivia) Freddy Alvarado

Round of 16
(Mauritius) Fabrice Valérie	5
(Thailand) Phanuwat Punnakorn	0
(French Polynesia) Nikee Cummings	0
(Russia) Bair Batlaev	5

Quarterfinals
(Mauritius) Fabrice Valérie	0
(Russia) Bair Batlaev	5

==== Section 4 ====
Round of 32
(Kenya) Kevin Maina	0
(Kazakhstan) Daniyal Sabit	5
(Cape Verde) Lenick Fernandes	KO
(Ecuador) Luis Guamán
(Moldova) Ion Plinga	WO
(Tanzania) Juma Athumani

Round of 16
(Kazakhstan) Daniyal Sabit	5
(Cape Verde) Lenick Fernandes	0
(Moldova) Ion Plinga	0
(Zambia) Patrick Chinyemba	5

Quarterfinals
(Kazakhstan) Daniyal Sabit	2
(Zambia) Patrick Chinyemba	5
