= 2021 AIBA World Boxing Championships – Minimumweight =

Boxing competition

Minimumweight at the 2021 AIBA World Boxing Championships
- Venue: Štark Arena
- Location: Belgrade, Serbia
- Dates: 27 October – 5 November
- Competitors: 23 from 23 nations

Medalists
gold medal	Temirtas Zhussupov	Kazakhstan
silver medal	Wuttichai Yurachai
bronze medal	Yauheni Karmilchyk	Belarus
bronze medal	Sakhil Alakhverdovi	Georgia

The Minimumweight competition at the 2021 AIBA World Boxing Championships was held from 27 October to 5 November 2021.

== Results ==
=== Finals ===
Semifinals
(Kazakhstan) Temirtas Zhussupov	5
(Belarus) Yauheni Karmilchyk	0
(Georgia (country)) Sakhil Alakhverdovi	0
Wuttichai Yurachai	5

Final
(Kazakhstan) Temirtas Zhussupov	5
Wuttichai Yurachai	0

=== Top half ===
==== Section 1 ====
First round
(Turkey) Muhammet Ünlü	1
(Serbia) Omer Ametović	4

Second round
(Kazakhstan) Temirtas Zhussupov	4
(Serbia) Omer Ametović	1
(Uzbekistan) Nodirjon Mirzakhmedov	5
(Republic of Ireland) Rickey Nesbitt	0

Quarterfinals
(Kazakhstan) Temirtas Zhussupov	5
(Uzbekistan) Nodirjon Mirzakhmedov	0

==== Section 2 ====
First round
(Mongolia) Gankhuyagiin Gan-Erdene	5
(Nepal) Rabin Thapa	0
(Belarus) Yauheni Karmilchyk	KO
(Sri Lanka) Sajeewa Mutunaka Pedi

Second round
(Germany) Christopher Goman	0
(Mongolia) Gankhuyagiin Gan-Erdene	5
(Belarus) Yauheni Karmilchyk	4
(Kenya) Martin Manyara	1

Quarterfinals
(Mongolia) Gankhuyagiin Gan-Erdene
(Belarus) Yauheni Karmilchyk	RSC

=== Bottom half ===
==== Section 3 ====
First round
(Armenia) Seyran Yeghikyan	3
(Italy) Nicola Cordella	0
(Ecuador) Billy Arias	2
(India) Govind Sahani	3

Second round
(Kyrgyzstan) Mirlan Turkbai Uulu	5
(Armenia) Seyran Yeghikyan	0
(India) Govind Sahani	0
(Georgia (country)) Sakhil Alakhverdovi	4

Quarterfinals
(Kyrgyzstan) Mirlan Turkbai Uulu	0
(Georgia (country)) Sakhil Alakhverdovi	5

==== Section 4 ====
First round
(Poland) Jakub Słomiński	0
Wuttichai Yurachai	5
Edmond Khudoian	5
(Ukraine) Andrii Yefymovych	0

Second round
(Chinese Taipei) Lin Hong-da	0
Wuttichai Yurachai	5
Edmond Khudoian
(Japan) Kazuma Aratake	DSQ

Quarterfinals
Wuttichai Yurachai	3
(Japan) Kazuma Aratake	2
