= Boxing at the 2018 Summer Youth Olympics – Boys' light welterweight =

Boxing competitions

Boys' light welterweight boxing at the III Summer Youth Olympic Games
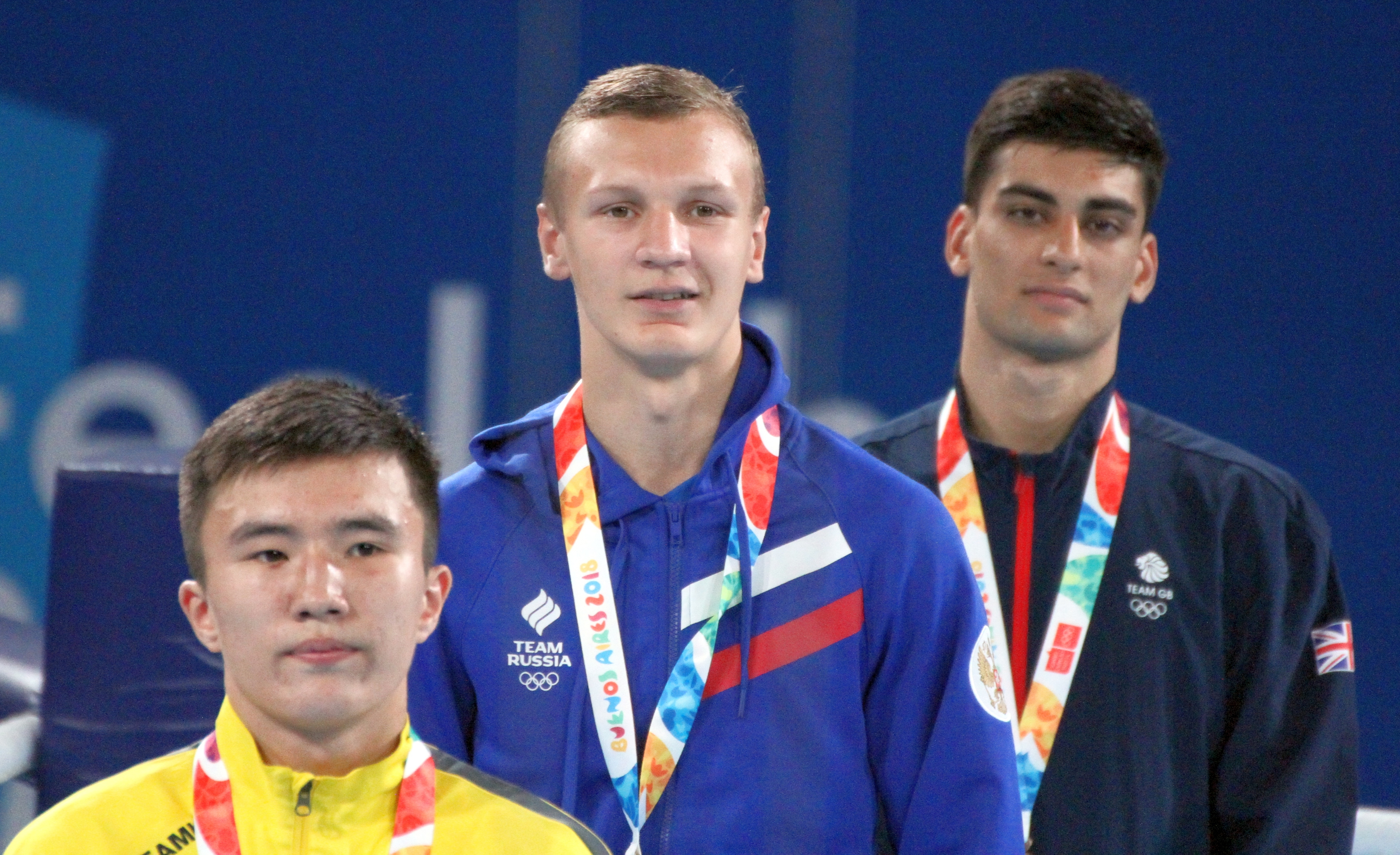
- 2018 Summer Youth Olympics – Boys' light welterweight Victory Ceremony
- Venue: Oceania Pavilion
- Date: 14–18 October
- Competitors: 6 from 6 nations

Medalists
1st place, gold medalist(s)		Ilya Popov	Russia
2nd place, silver medalist(s)		Talgat Shaiken	Kazakhstan
3rd place, bronze medalist(s)		Hassan Azim	Great Britain

The boys' light welterweight boxing competition at the 2018 Summer Youth Olympics in Buenos Aires was held from 14 to 18 October at the Oceania Pavilion.

== Schedule ==
All times are local (UTC−3).

Date	Time	Round
Sunday, 14 October	18:32	Preliminary Round 1
Monday, 15 October	18:30	Preliminary Round 2
Tuesday, 16 October	18:31	Semifinals
Thursday, 18 October	14:00	Finals

== Results ==
Preliminary Round 1
Hassan Azim (GBR)	4
Otha Jones III (USA)	1
Mohammed Boulaouja (MAR)	3
Erdonis Maliqi (KOS)	2

Preliminary Round 2
Ilya Popov (RUS)	3
Otha Jones III (USA)	2
Erdonis Maliqi (KOS)
Talgat Shaiken (KAZ)	WO

Semifinals
Hassan Azim (GBR)	1
Ilya Popov (RUS)	4
Talgat Shaiken (KAZ)	RSC
Mohammed Boulaouja (MAR)
Fifth place
Otha Jones III (USA)	NC¹
Erdonis Maliqi (KOS)

Final
Ilya Popov (RUS)	4
Talgat Shaiken (KAZ)	1
Third place
Hassan Azim (GBR)	RSC
Mohammed Boulaouja (MAR)

¹ AIBA doctors and national coaches from both teams have declared, in order to protect the safety of the athletes, USA’s Jones Otha and Kosovo’s Maliqi Erdonis unfit to compete today. Therefore, the bout is declared as No Contest.

== Final standings ==
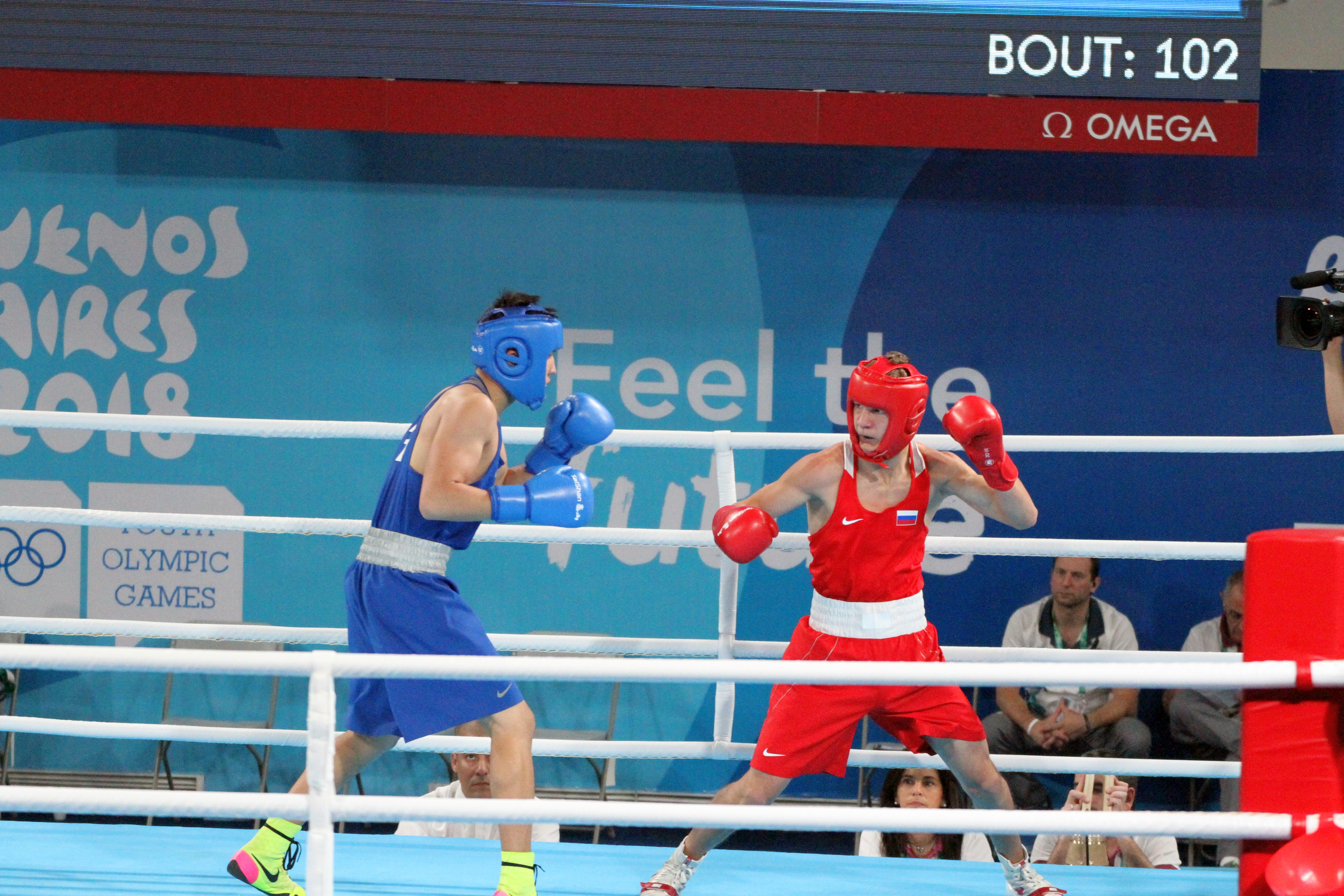
Gold Medal Bout Popov vs Shaiken

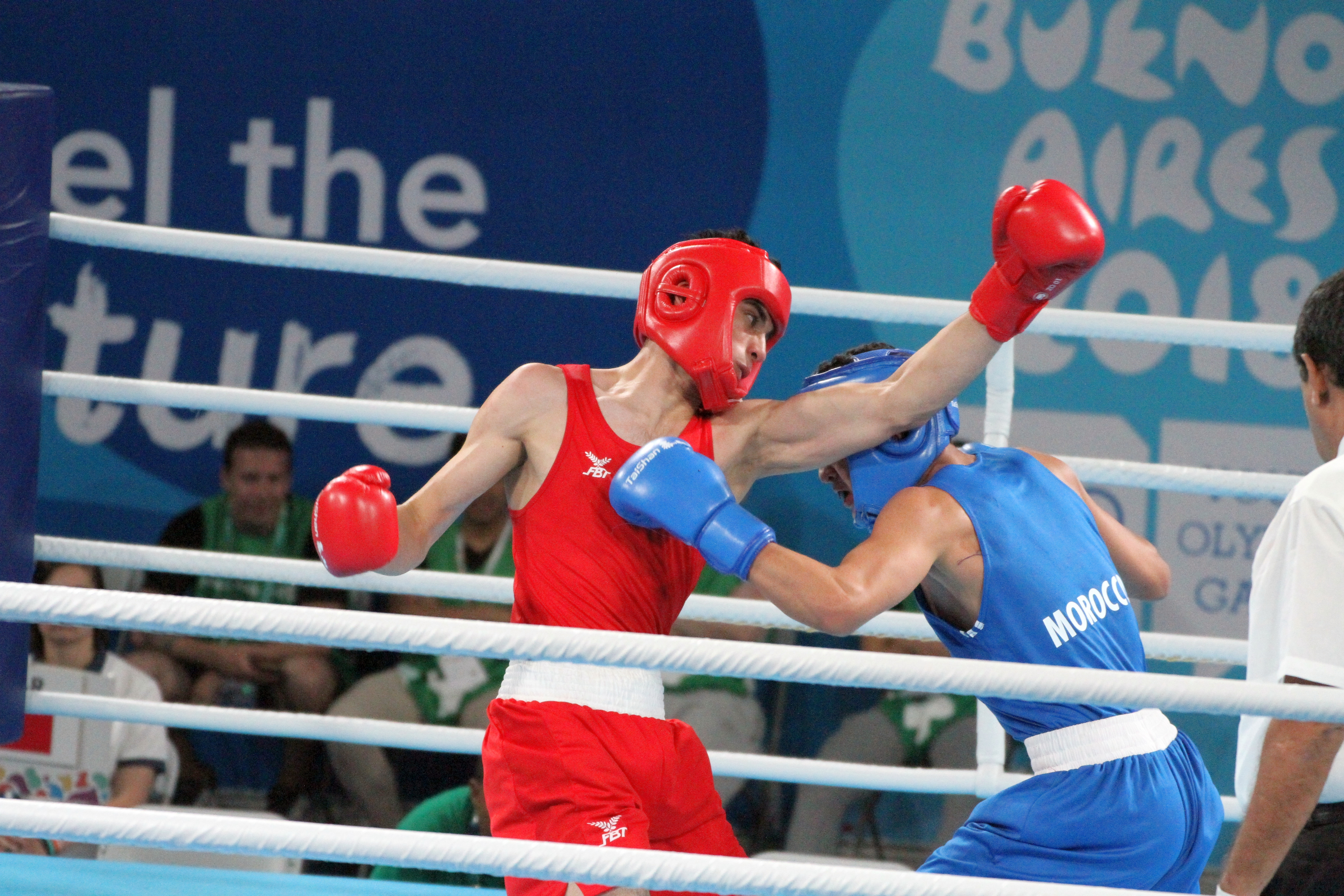
Bronze Medal Bout Azim vs Boulaouja

Rank	Athlete
1st place, gold medalist(s)	Ilya Popov (RUS)
2nd place, silver medalist(s)	Talgat Shaiken (KAZ)
3rd place, bronze medalist(s)	Hassan Azim (GBR)
4	Mohammed Boulaouja (MAR)
5	Otha Jones III (USA)
6	Erdonis Maliqi (KOS)
