= 2026 European Boxing Championships – Men's 50 kg =

Men's 50 kg at the 2026 European Boxing Championships
- Venue: Asics Arena
- Location: Sofia, Bulgaria
- Dates: 20–24 September
- Competitors: 14 from 14 nations

Medalists
gold medal	Subhan Mamedov	Azerbaijan
silver medal	Bair Batlaev	Russia
bronze medal	Rudolf Garboyan	Armenia
bronze medal	Samet Gümüş	Turkey

The men's 50 kg competition at the 2026 European Boxing Championships was held from 20 to 24 September 2026.

== Results ==
Round of 16; 20 September
(Russia) Bair Batlaev	5
(Georgia (country)) Sakhil Alakhverdovi	0
(Portugal) Leandro Almeida	2
(Armenia) Rudolf Garboyan	3
(Greece) Alexandros Mavromatis	0
(Israel) David Zakhari	5
(Azerbaijan) Subhan Mamedov	5
(Albania) Emanuel Koço	0
(Moldova) Cătălin Turcu	1
(Hungary) István Szaka	4
(Bulgaria) Ergyunal Sabri	0
(Ukraine) Maksym Rudyk	5

Quarterfinals; 22 September
(Spain) Martín Molina
(Russia) Bair Batlaev	RSC-I
(Armenia) Rudolf Garboyan	4
(Israel) David Zakhari	1
(Azerbaijan) Subhan Mamedov	3
(Hungary) István Szaka	2
(Ukraine) Maksym Rudyk	1
(Turkey) Samet Gümüş	4

Semifinals; 23 September
(Russia) Bair Batlaev	5
(Armenia) Rudolf Garboyan	0
(Azerbaijan) Subhan Mamedov	3
(Turkey) Samet Gümüş	2

Final; 24 September
(Russia) Bair Batlaev	1
(Azerbaijan) Subhan Mamedov	4
