= Subhan Mamedov =

Azerbaijani boxer

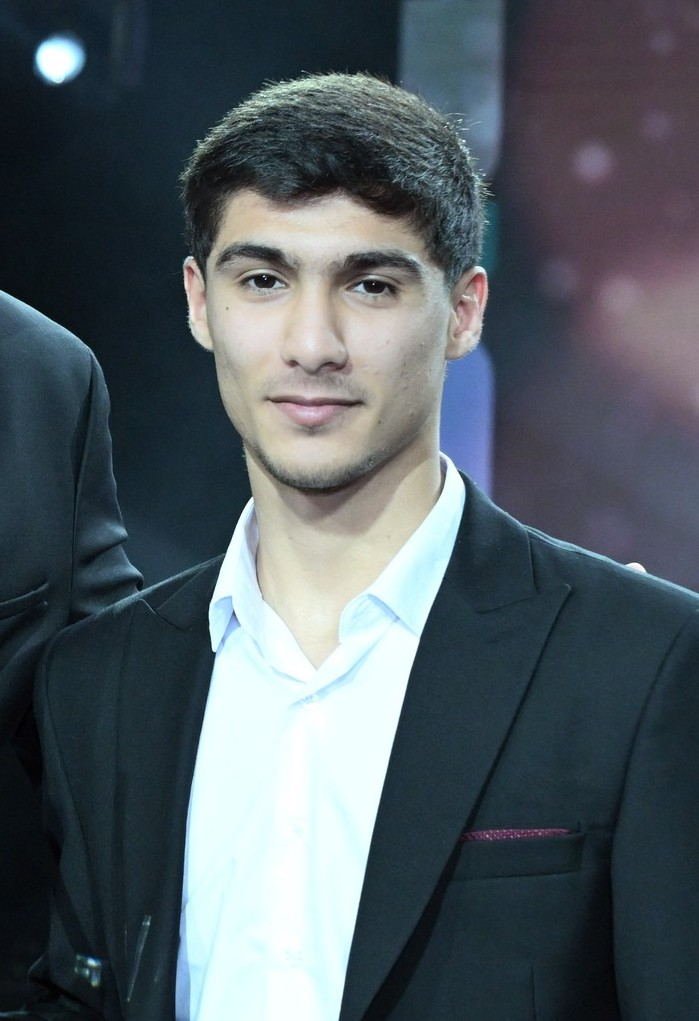
- Mamedov in 2025

Personal information
- Nationality: Azerbaijan
- Born: 7 September 2006 (age 20) Aghjabadi, Azerbaijan

Boxing career
Medal record
Men's amateur boxing
Representing Azerbaijan
IBA World Championships
Gold medal – first place	2025 Dubai	Minimumweight
European Boxing Championships
Gold medal – first place	2026 Sofia	50 kg

Subhan Mamedov (born 7 September 2006) is an Azerbaijani boxer. He competed at the 2025 IBA Men's World Boxing Championships, winning the gold medal in the minimumweight event.
