= Asilbek Jalilov =

Uzbek boxer

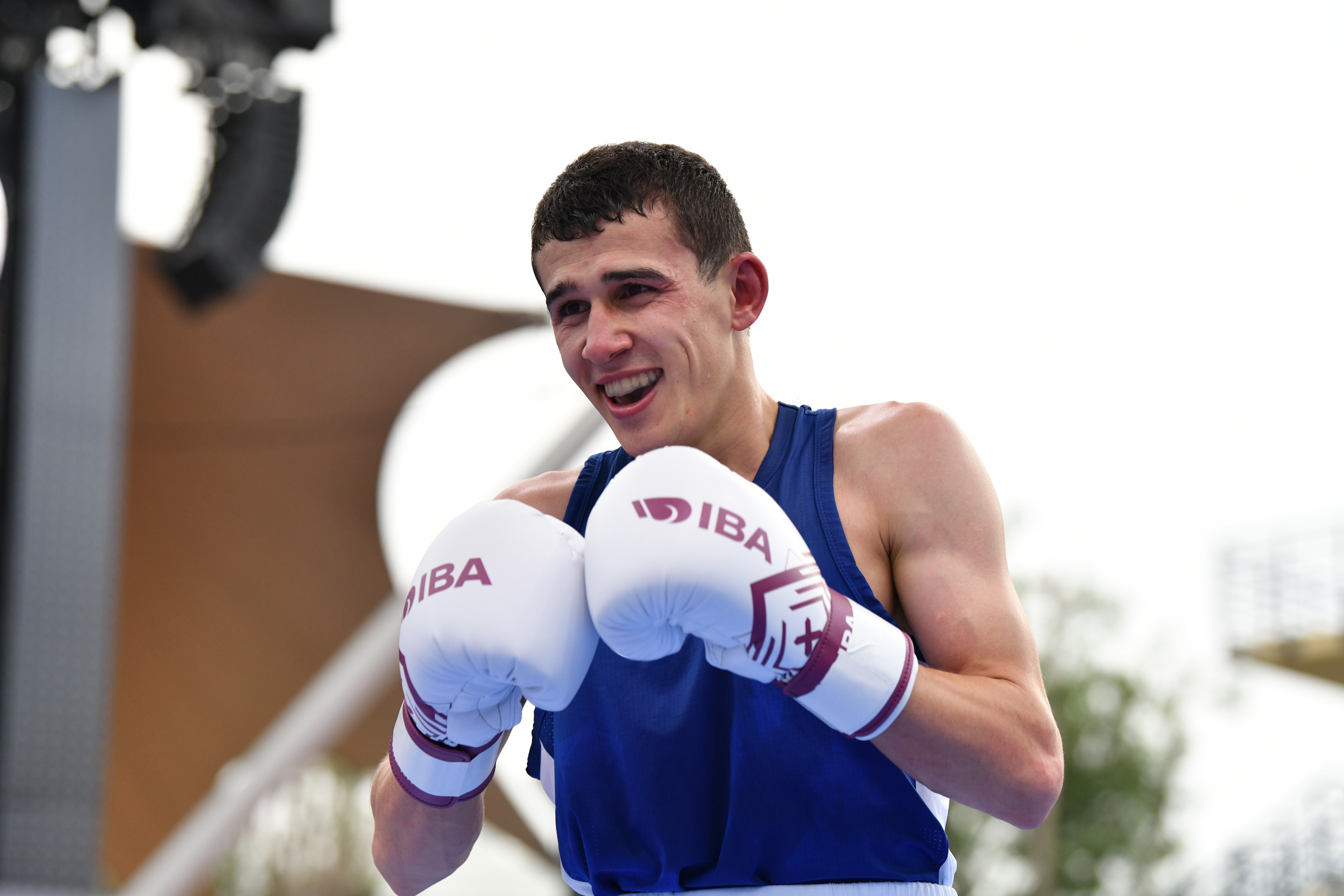
- Jalilov at the IBA 2025 Men's World Boxing Championships

Personal information
- Nationality: Uzbekistan
- Height: 1.70 m (5 ft 7 in)
- Weight: Flyweight

Boxing career
- Stance: Southpaw
Medal record
Men's amateur boxing
Representing Uzbekistan
IBA World Championships
Bronze medal – third place	2025 Dubai	Bantamweight
Asian Championships
Gold medal – first place	2024 Chiang Mai	Flyweight
Asian U22 Boxing Championships
Gold medal – first place	2022 Tashkent	Minimumweight (48 kg)

Asilbek Jalilov is an Uzbek amateur boxer. He is the gold medalist at the 2024 Asian Amateur Boxing Championships and bronze medalist at the 2025 IBA Men's World Boxing Championships.

== Career ==
Jalilov began competing internationally as an elite amateur in early 2022, appearing in tournaments such as the Asian U22 Championships, the Elorda Cup and other international events.

=== 2022 Asian U22 Boxing Championships: gold ===
In January 2022, Jalilov won gold at the Asian U22 Boxing Championships in Tashkent, defeating Qaiyum Ariffin, Zohaib Rasheed and Kazuma Aratake.

=== 2024 Asian Amateur Boxing Championships: gold ===
At the 2024 Asian Championships in Chiang Mai, Jalilov won gold after victories over Lkhagvadorj Davaadorj, Saken Bibossinov, Pasindu Umayanga Mihiran Godakandalage and Marvin Tabamo.

=== 2025 World Boxing Cup (Foz do Iguaçu): gold ===
At the 2025 World Boxing Cup stage in Foz do Iguaçu, Jalilov won gold, defeating Nurzat Ongarov, Jadumani Singh Mandengbam and Nikee Cummings.

=== 2025 IBA Men's World Boxing Championships: bronze ===
At the 2025 IBA Men's World Boxing Championships in Dubai, Jalilov won his opening bouts against Sadai Ahiskali and Mohammed Amadu before being defeated by Vyacheslav Rogozin, finishing with a bronze medal in the bantamweight event.
