= Judo at the 2018 Summer Youth Olympics – Girls' 44 kg =

Judo competition

Girls' 44 kg at the III Summer Youth Olympic Games
- Venue: Parque Polideportivo Roca
- Date: October 7
- Competitors: 14 from 14 nations

Medalists
1st place, gold medalist(s)		María Giménez	Venezuela
2nd place, silver medalist(s)		Tababi Devi Thangjam	India
3rd place, bronze medalist(s)		Erza Muminoviq	Kosovo
3rd place, bronze medalist(s)		Ana Viktorija Puljiz	Croatia

The Girls' 44 kg competition at the 2018 Summer Youth Olympics was held on 7 October, at the Asia Pavilion.

== Schedule ==
All times are in local time (UTC-3).

Date	Time	Round
Sunday, 7 October 2018	10:00; 11:00; 11:00; 12:00; 15:00	Round of 16; Quarterfinals; Repechage Rounds; Semifinals; Finals

== Results ==
Legend

- 1st number — Ippon
- 2nd number — Waza-ari
- s — Shido

=== Main Bracket ===
Round of 16
Tababi Devi Thangjam (IND)	10
Yangchen Wangmo (BHU)	00
Ana Viktorija Puljiz (CRO)	10
Soniya Bhatta (NEP)	00s3
Vusala Karimova (AZE)	10
Aleksa Georgieva (BUL)	00
Mikaela Rojas (ARG)	10
Houda Faissal (DJI)	00
Giorgia Hagianu (ROU)	01
Eva Pérez Soler (ESP)	10
Paulina Țurcan (MDA)	00
Anastasia Balaban (UKR)	10

Quarterfinals
Erza Muminoviq (KOS)	00
Tababi Devi Thangjam (IND)	01s2
Ana Viktorija Puljiz (CRO)	01
Vusala Karimova (AZE)	00s1
María Giménez (VEN)	10
Mikaela Rojas (ARG)	00s2
Eva Pérez Soler (ESP)	00
Anastasia Balaban (UKR)	10

Semifinals
Tababi Devi Thangjam (IND)	10
Ana Viktorija Puljiz (CRO)	00s1
María Giménez (VEN)	01
Anastasia Balaban (UKR)	00

Final
Tababi Devi Thangjam (IND)	00s1
María Giménez (VEN)	11

=== Repechage ===
Repechage 1
Soniya Bhatta (NEP)	00
Aleksa Georgieva (BUL)	10
Giorgia Hagianu (ROU)	01s1
Paulina Țurcan (MDA)	00

Repechage 2
Yangchen Wangmo (BHU)	00
Vusala Karimova (AZE)	10
Aleksa Georgieva (BUL)	00
Erza Muminoviq (KOS)	10s1
Houda Faissal (DJI)	00
Eva Pérez Soler (ESP)	10
Giorgia Hagianu (ROU)	01s3
Mikaela Rojas (ARG)	11s1

Repechage 3
Vusala Karimova (AZE)	00s2
Erza Muminoviq (KOS)	10s2
Eva Pérez Soler (ESP)	00s3
Mikaela Rojas (ARG)	10

Bronze Medal Finals
Erza Muminoviq (KOS)	10
Anastasia Balaban (UKR)	00
Mikaela Rojas (ARG)	00s2
Ana Viktorija Puljiz (CRO)	10

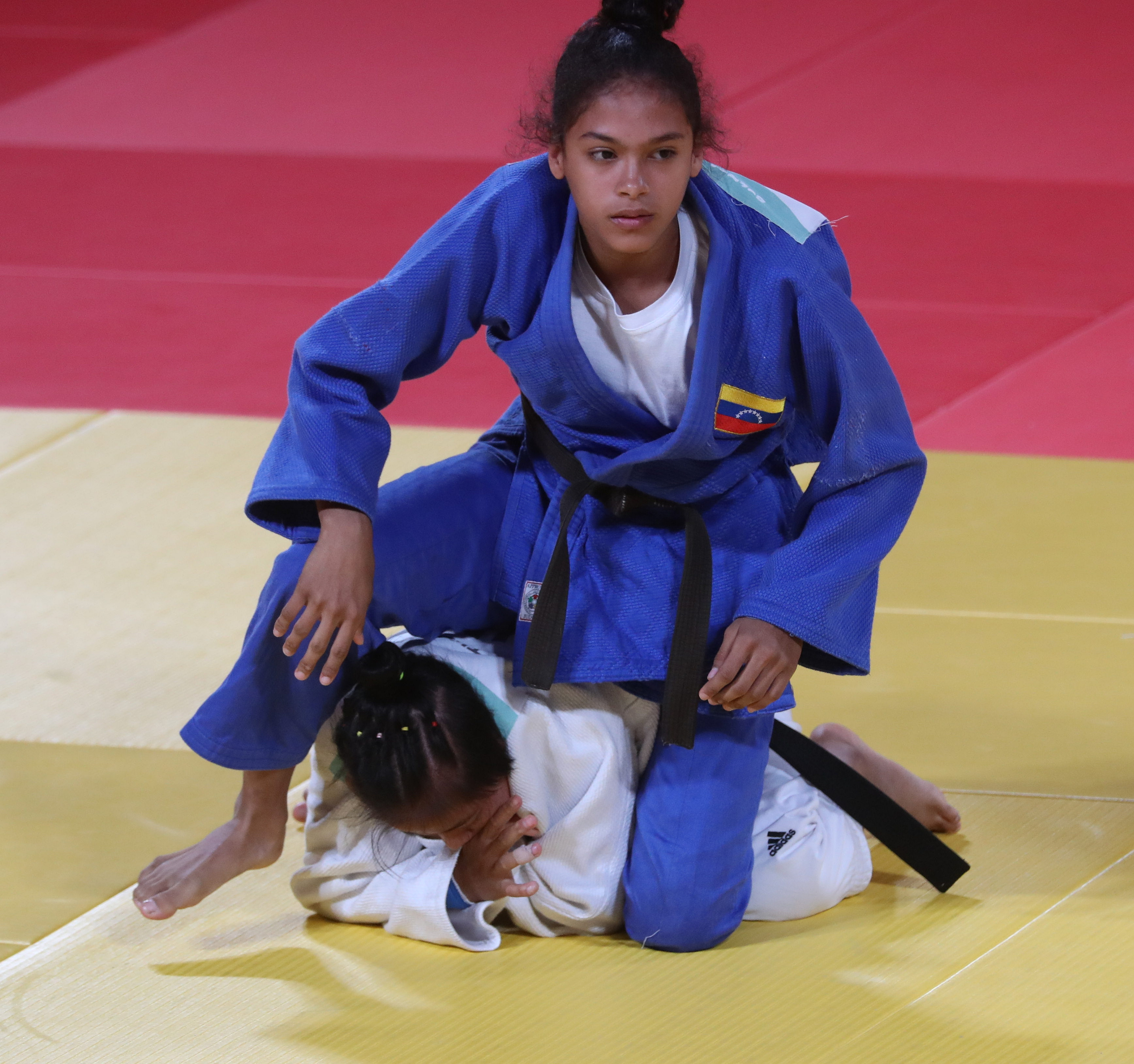
Final: María Giménez (on top) vs. Tababi Devi Thangjam

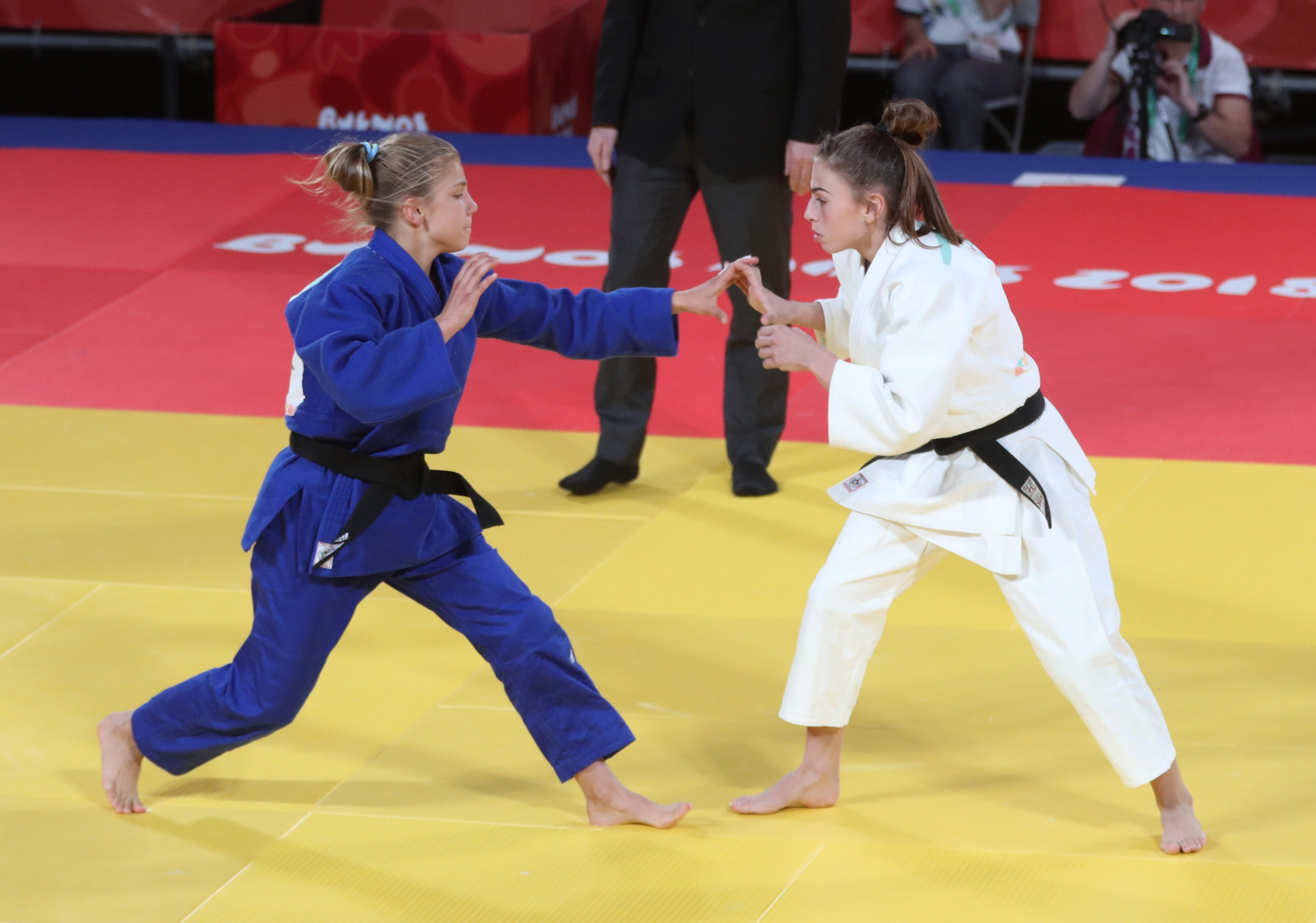
Bronze medal match: Erza Muminoviq (right) vs. Anastasia Balaban

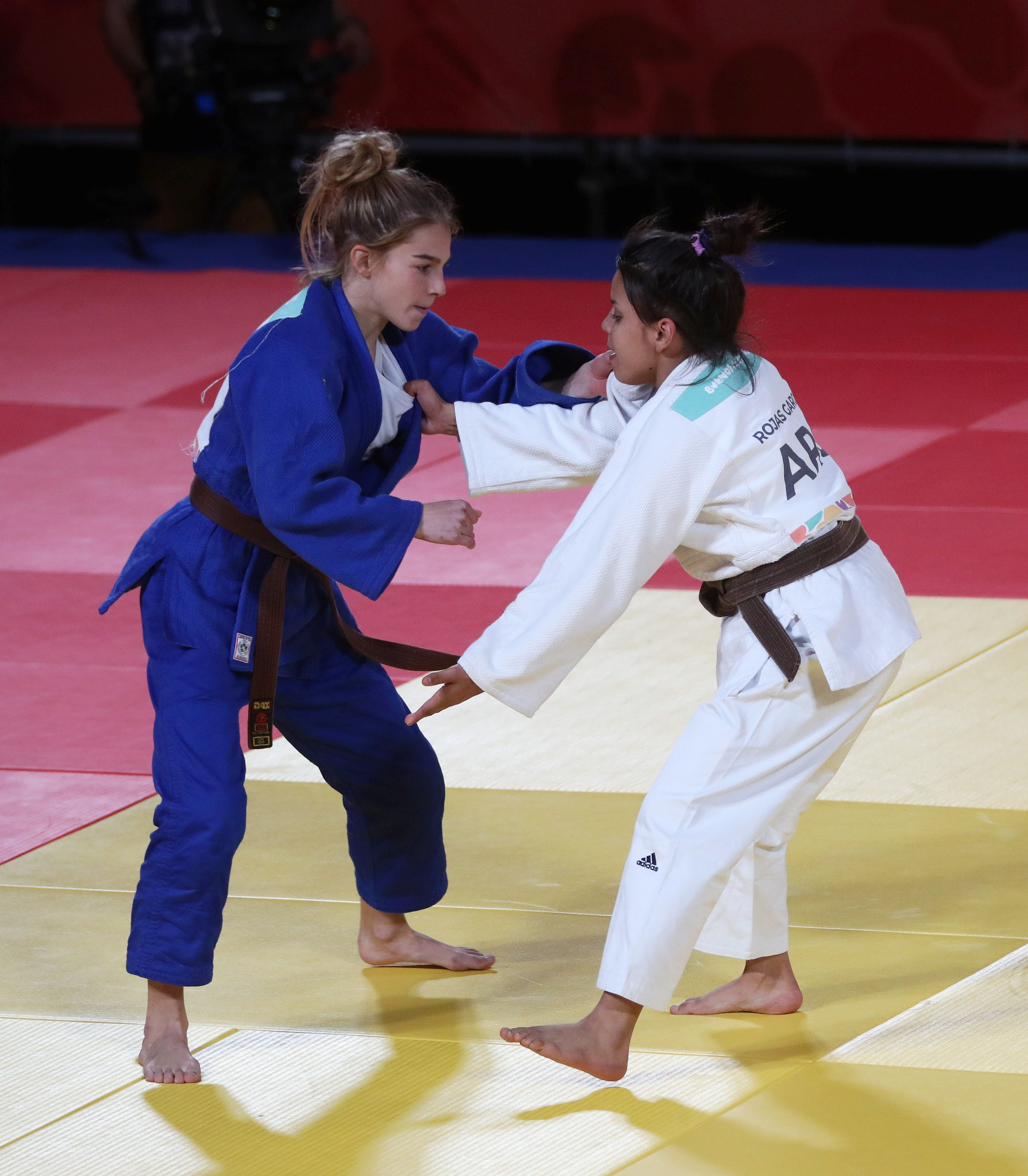
Bronze medal match: Mikaela Rojas vs. Ana Viktorija Puljiz (left)

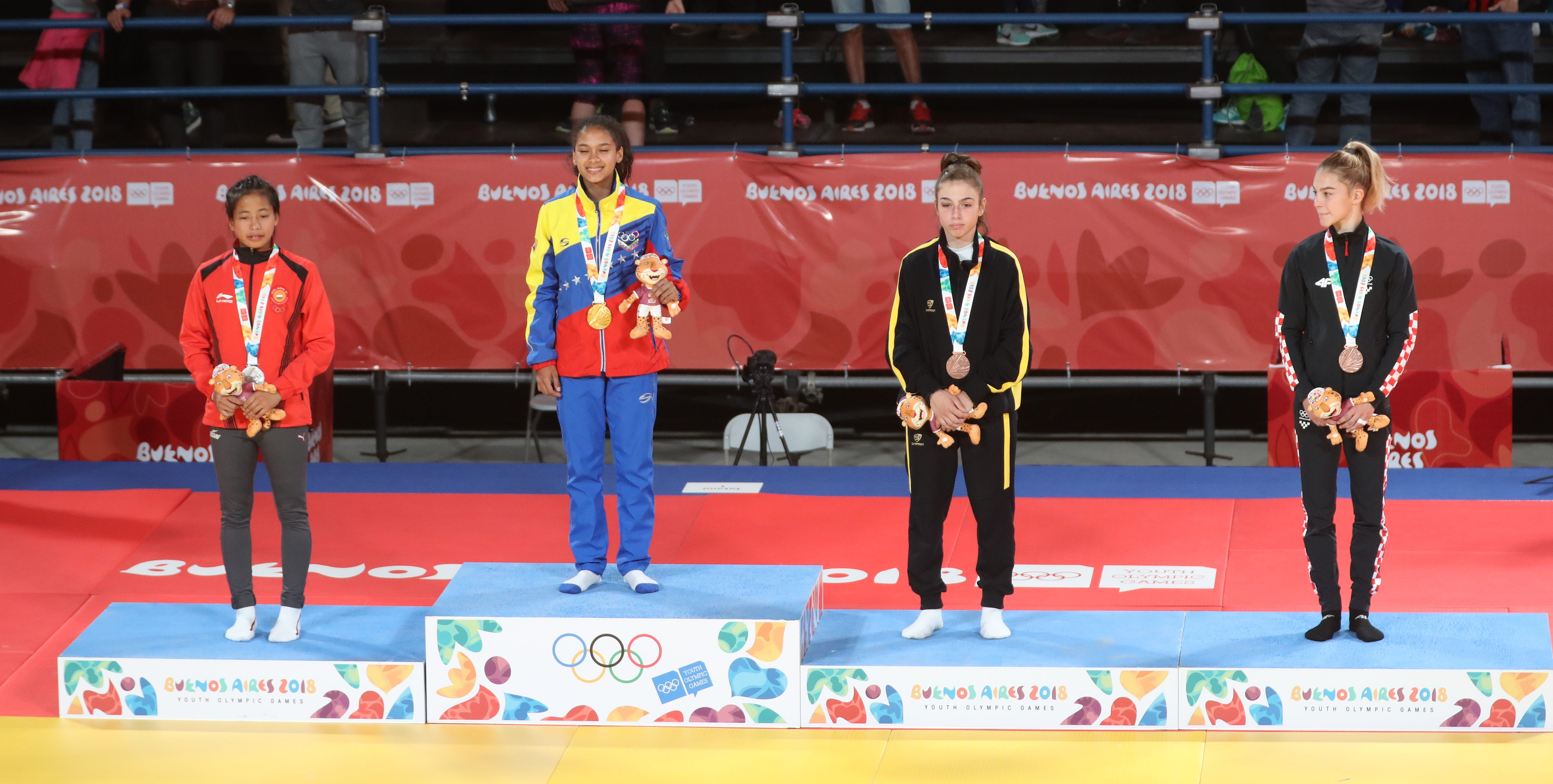
Victory ceremony
