= Ilya Popov =

Russian boxer

Ilya Popov Илья Попов
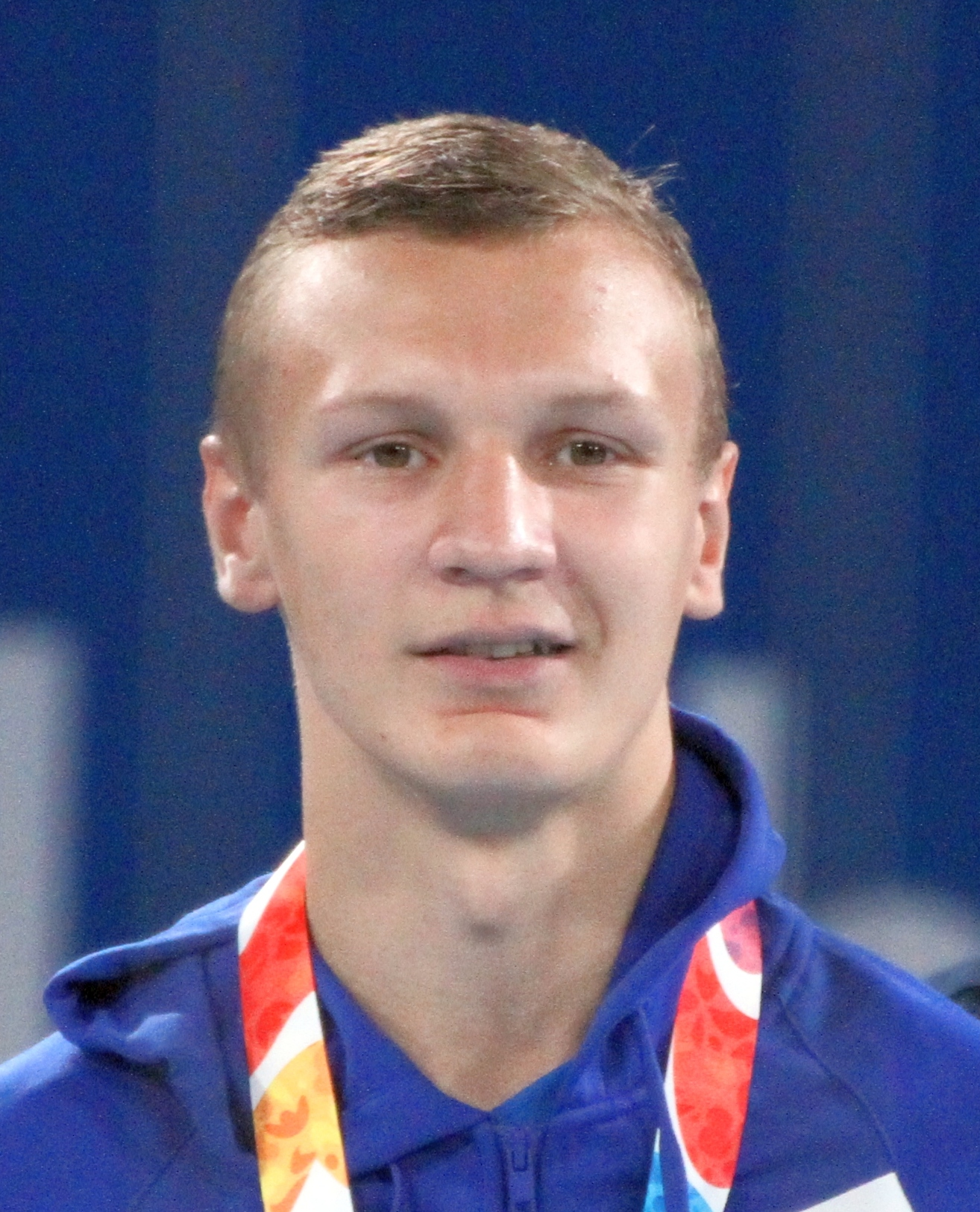
- Popov at the 2018 Summer Youth Olympics

Personal information
- Born: 19 June 2000 (age 26) Morshansk, Russia
- Height: 5 ft 9 in (175 cm)
- Weight: Light-welterweight

Boxing career
- Stance: Southpaw
Medal record
Men's amateur boxing
Representing Russia
IBA World Championships
Gold medal – first place	2025 Dubai	Light welterweight
Youth Olympic Games
Gold medal – first place	2018 Buenos Aires	Light-welterweight
Youth World Championships
Silver medal – second place	2018 Budapest	Light-welterweight
European Youth Championships
Gold medal – first place	2018 Roseto	Light-welterweight

Ilya Alekseyevich Popov (Russian: Илья Алексеевич Попов; born 19 June 2000) is a Russian amateur boxer who won gold medals at the 2018 Youth Olympics and 2018 European Youth Championships, and silver at the 2018 Youth World Championships, all in the light-welterweight division. In 2019 he joined the senior ranks and competed at the World Championships, losing in the quarter-finals to eventual gold medallist Andy Cruz of Cuba.
