= 2025 IBA World Boxing Championships – Featherweight =

Featherweight at the 2025 IBA World Boxing Championships
- Venue: Dubai Duty Free Tennis Stadium
- Location: Dubai, United Arab Emirates
- Dates: 5–13 December
- Competitors: 33

Medalists
gold medal	Orazbek Assylkulov	Kazakhstan
silver medal	Khusravkhon Rakhimov	Tajikistan
bronze medal	Andrei Peglivanian	Russia
bronze medal	Khujanazar Nortojiev	Uzbekistan

The Featherweight competition at the 2025 IBA Men's World Boxing Championships was held from 5 to 13 December 2025.

== Results ==
=== Finals ===
Semifinals
(Kazakhstan) Orazbek Assylkulov	5
(Russia) Andrei Peglivanian	0
(Uzbekistan) Khujanazar Nortojiev	0
(Tajikistan) Khusravkhon Rakhimov	5

Final
(Kazakhstan) Orazbek Assylkulov	5
(Tajikistan) Khusravkhon Rakhimov	0

=== Top half ===
==== Section 1 ====
Round of 64
(Sint Maarten) Kesny Joseph	1
(Cape Verde) Elisandro Sanches da Silva	4

Round of 32
(Kazakhstan) Orazbek Assylkulov	5
(Cape Verde) Elisandro Sanches da Silva	0
(Eswatini) Mukelo Dlamini	5
(Rwanda) Abdul Havyarimana	0
(Portugal) Sérgio Rodrigues	5
(Guyana) Keevin Allicock	2
(Spain) Carlos Martínez Bernad	5
(Philippines) Jayson Mama	0

Round of 16
(Kazakhstan) Orazbek Assylkulov	KO
(Eswatini) Mukelo Dlamini
(Portugal) Sérgio Rodrigues	0
(Spain) Carlos Martínez Bernad	5

Quarterfinals
(Kazakhstan) Orazbek Assylkulov	5
(Spain) Carlos Martínez Bernad	0

==== Section 2 ====
Round of 64

Round of 32
(Malawi) Patson Ledson
(Russia) Andrei Peglivanian	RSC
(Albania) Ardit Murja	0
(Brazil) Pablo Vitor	5
(Kenya) Paul Omondi	4
(Libya) Ahmed Al-Koum	3
(Mozambique) Armando Sigauque	4
(Australia) Ahmad Serat Jamal	1

Round of 16
(Russia) Andrei Peglivanian	5
(Brazil) Pablo Vitor	0
(Kenya) Paul Omondi	0
(Mozambique) Armando Sigauque	5

Quarterfinals
(Russia) Andrei Peglivanian	5
(Mozambique) Armando Sigauque	0

=== Bottom half ===
==== Section 3 ====
Round of 64

Round of 32
(Mauritius) Niven Chemben	5
(Burkina Faso) Abdoul Lawal Zore	0
(Armenia) Zhirayr Sargsyan	RSC
(Comoros) Ben Cheik Hassani
(India) Sachin Siwach	5
(Azerbaijan) Umid Rustamov	2
(Uzbekistan) Khujanazar Nortojiev	5
(Sri Lanka) Rukmal Prasanna	0

Round of 16
(Mauritius) Niven Chemben
(Armenia) Zhirayr Sargsyan	KO
(India) Sachin Siwach	0
(Uzbekistan) Khujanazar Nortojiev	5

Quarterfinals
(Armenia) Zhirayr Sargsyan	1
(Uzbekistan) Khujanazar Nortojiev	4

==== Section 4 ====
Round of 64

Round of 32
(United Arab Emirates) Nawwaf Al-Zahmi
(South Africa) Masibulele Sigwela	RSC
(Belarus) Dzianis Salotskikh	5
(Papua New Guinea) Allan Oaike	0
(Ghana) Emmanuel Mawuli	0
(Mongolia) Kharkhüügiin Enkh-Amar	5
(Lesotho) Toka Litabe
(Tajikistan) Khusravkhon Rakhimov	RSC

Round of 16
(South Africa) Masibulele Sigwela	5
(Belarus) Dzianis Salotskikh	0
(Mongolia) Kharkhüügiin Enkh-Amar	3
(Tajikistan) Khusravkhon Rakhimov	4

Quarterfinals
(South Africa) Masibulele Sigwela	0
(Tajikistan) Khusravkhon Rakhimov	5
