= Emmanuel Katema =

Zambian boxer

Personal information
- Nationality: Zambia

Boxing career
Medal record
Men's amateur boxing
Representing Zambia
IBA World Championships
Bronze medal – third place	2025 Dubai	Light welterweight
African Games
Silver medal – second place	2023 Accra	63.5 kg

Emmanuel Katema is a Zambian boxer. He competed at the 2025 IBA Men's World Boxing Championships, winning the bronze medal in the light welterweight event. He also competed at the 2026 Commonwealth Games, winning the bronze medal in the men's 65 kg event.
