= Jorge Castaneda (boxer) =

American boxer

Personal information
- Born: 31 October 1996 (age 29) Laredo, Texas, U.S.
- Height: 5 ft 10 in (178 cm)
- Weight: Super-featherweight; Lightweight

Boxing career
- Reach: 70 in (178 cm)
- Stance: Orthodox

Boxing record
- Total fights: 21
- Wins: 17
- Win by KO: 13
- Losses: 4

Jorge David Castaneda (born October 31, 1996) is an American professional boxer who held the WBC International Silver super featherweight title from October 2021 to June 2022.

== Professional career ==
Castaneda made his professional debut on August 14, 2015, scoring a third-round knockout (KO) victory against Angel Vargas at Laredo Energy Arena in Laredo, Texas.

After compiling a record of 7–0 (7 KOs), he defeated Ángel Martínez via eighth-round technical knockout (TKO), capturing the vacant WBC Youth Intercontinental super featherweight title on February 10, 2017, at the Laredo Energy Arena. Following a TKO victory against Jose Silveria in a non-title fight in July, Castaneda lost the title in his first defense, suffering a sixth-round TKO loss against Randy Moreno Ochoa on February 9, 2018, at the Laredo Energy Arena.

Following a TKO victory against Carlos Villareal in July, Castaneda defeated José Antonio Martínez via third-round KO on December 7, capturing the inaugural ABF USA lightweight title at the Sames Auto Arena in Laredo, Texas.

Two fights later he moved back down to super featherweight, defeating Pedro Amigon via eight-round unanimous decision (UD), capturing the inaugural ABF USA title on April 19, 2019, at the Sames Auto Arena.

In his next fight he scored a majority decision (MD) victory against undefeated prospect Otha Jones III in April 2021, before facing another undefeated prospect, Youssef Khoumari, for the vacant WBC International Silver super featherweight title on October 30 at The O2 Arena in London, England. Serving as part of the undercard for Chantelle Cameron vs. Mary McGee, Castaneda defeated Khoumari via ten-round MD, with two judges scoring the bout 97–94 and 96–94 in favour of Castaneda while the third judge scored it a draw at 95–95.

Castaneda faced Charly Suarez for the vacant WBO International super featherweight title in Glendale, Arizona, on September 20, 2024. He lost by stoppage in the third round.

== Professional boxing record ==
| 21 fights | 17 wins | 4 losses |
|---|---|---|
| By knockout | 13 | 3 |
| By decision | 4 | 1 |

| No. | Result | Record | Opponent | Type | Round, time | Date | Location | Notes |
|---|---|---|---|---|---|---|---|---|
| 21 | Loss | 17–4 | Charly Suarez | TKO | 3 (10), 2:22 | Sep 20, 2024 | Desert Diamond Arena, Glendale, Arizona, U.S. | For vacant WBO International super featherweight title |
| 20 | Win | 17–3 | Ángel Hernández | TKO | 2 (6), 2:47 | Aug 31, 2024 | Sames Auto Arena, Laredo, Texas, U.S. | |
| 19 | Loss | 16–3 | Orlando González | SD | 10 | Nov 29, 2023 | WhiteSands Events Center, Plant City, Florida, U.S. | |
| 18 | Win | 16–2 | Nestor Medellín | KO | 8 (8), 2:11 | Aug 19, 2023 | Sames Auto Arena, Laredo, Texas, U.S. | |
| 17 | Loss | 15–2 | Eduardo Hernández | TKO | 1 (10), 1:35 | Jun 10, 2022 | Domo Alcade, Guadalajara, Mexico | Lost WBC International Silver super featherweight title |
| 16 | Win | 15–1 | Youssef Khoumari | MD | 10 | Oct 30, 2021 | The O2 Arena, London, England | Won vacant WBC International Silver super featherweight title |
| 15 | Win | 14–1 | Otha Jones III | MD | 8 | Apr 17, 2021 | Seminole Hard Rock Hotel & Casino, Hollywood, Florida, U.S. | |
| 14 | Win | 12–1 | Pedro Amigon | UD | 8 | Apr 19, 2019 | Sames Auto Arena, Laredo, Texas, U.S. | Won vacant ABF USA super featherweight title |
| 13 | Win | 12–1 | Carlos Ramírez | MD | 8 | Feb 16, 2019 | Poliforum, Ciudad Cuauhtémoc, Mexico | |
| 12 | Win | 11–1 | José Antonio Martínez | KO | 3 (8), 1:47 | Dec 7, 2018 | Sames Auto Arena, Laredo, Texas, U.S. | Won vacant ABF USA lightweight title |
| 11 | Win | 10–1 | Carlos Villareal | TKO | 6 (10), 2:29 | Jul 27, 2018 | Laredo Energy Arena, Laredo, Texas, U.S. | |
| 10 | Loss | 9–1 | Randy Moreno Ochoa | TKO | 6 (10), 0:29 | Feb 9, 2018 | Laredo Energy Arena, Laredo, Texas, U.S. | Lost WBC Youth Intercontinental super featherweight title |
| 9 | Win | 9–0 | Jose Silveria | UD | 2 (8), 2:05 | Jul 28, 2017 | Laredo Energy Arena, Laredo, Texas, U.S. | |
| 8 | Win | 8–0 | Ángel Martínez | TKO | 8 (10), 1:22 | Feb 10, 2017 | Laredo Energy Arena, Laredo, Texas, U.S. | Won vacant WBC Youth Intercontinental super featherweight title |
| 7 | Win | 7–0 | Jose Guerra | KO | 1 (4), 1:44 | Oct 28, 2016 | Laredo Energy Arena, Laredo, Texas, U.S. | |
| 6 | Win | 6–0 | Gabriel Rangel | TKO | 2 (6), 1:19 | Aug 5, 2016 | Laredo Energy Arena, Laredo, Texas, U.S. | |
| 5 | Win | 5–0 | Jeremy Longoria | TKO | 2 (6), 2:49 | May 21, 2016 | Laredo Energy Arena, Laredo, Texas, U.S. | |
| 4 | Win | 4–0 | Ivan Ceron | KO | 1 (4), 1:54 | Mar 25, 2016 | Laredo Coliseum, Laredo, Texas, U.S. | |
| 3 | Win | 3–0 | Julio Macotela | TKO | 1 (4), 2:09 | Feb 26, 2016 | Laredo Energy Arena, Laredo, Texas, U.S. | |
| 2 | Win | 2–0 | Jahaziel Vazquez | KO | 2 (4), 1:29 | Nov 6, 2015 | Laredo Coliseum, Laredo, Texas, U.S. | |
| 1 | Win | 1–0 | Angel Vargas | KO | 3 (4), 1:11 | Aug 4, 2015 | Laredo Energy Arena, Laredo, Texas, U.S. | |

Sporting positions
Regional boxing titles
| Vacant Title last held by Miguel Berchelt | WBC Youth Intercontinental super featherweight champion February 10, 2017 – February 9, 2018 | Vacant Title next held by Randy Moreno Ochoa |
| Inaugural champion | ABF USA lightweight champion December 7, 2018 – 2019 | Vacant Title next held by Antonio Williams |
| Inaugural champion | ABF USA super featherweight champion April 19, 2019 – 2021 | Vacant |
| Vacant Title last held by Michael Magnesi | WBC Intercontinental Silver super featherweight champion October 30, 2021 – present | Incumbent |
