= 2025 IBA Men's World Boxing Championships =

Sport tournament

2025 IBA Men's World Amateur Boxing Championships
- Venue: Dubai Duty Free Tennis Stadium
- Location: Dubai, United Arab Emirates
- Dates: 4–13 December
- Competitors: in 13 events
- Total prize money: 8.32 million $

The 2025 IBA Men's World Boxing Championships (23rd) were held in Dubai, United Arab Emirates, from 4 to 13 December 2025.

The start of the competition had been postponed by a day due to delays in issuing visas for athletes from Kyrgyzstan.

== Prize money ==
The championships offered a record US$8.32 million prize fund, described by the IBA as an unprecedented/record purse for amateur boxing. In each weight category, prize money was awarded to the gold, silver and bronze medalists and to 5th-place finishers: US$300,000 (gold), US$150,000 (silver), US$75,000 (bronze), and US$10,000 (5th place). The IBA stated that each prize was split 50% to the boxer, 25% to the coach, and 25% to the national federation.

== Schedule ==
All times are local (UTC+4).

Date Event	Thu 4		Fri 5		Sat 6		Sun 7		Mon 8		Tue 9		Wen 10		Thu 11		Fri 12	Sat 13
Date Event	17:00	21:00	17:00	21:00	17:00	21:00	17:00	21:00	17:00	21:00	17:00	21:00	17:00	21:00	16:00	21:00		17:00
Minimumweight			R32							R16			QF		SF			F
Flyweight					R32							R16		QF		SF		F
Bantamweight		R64			R32						R16		QF		SF			F
Featherweight				R64			R32					R16		QF		SF		F
Lightweight	R64				R32					R16			QF		SF			F
Light welterweight		R64					R32				R16			QF		SF		F
Welterweight	R64		R32						R16				QF		SF			F
Light middleweight	R64						R32					R16		QF		SF		F
Middleweight		R64			R32					R16			QF		SF			F
Light heavyweight	R64		R32						R16					QF		SF		F
Cruiserweight				R32							R16		QF		SF			F
Heavyweight	R32								R16					QF		SF		F
Super heavyweight			R32						R16				QF			SF		F

== Medal summary ==
=== Medal table ===
* Host nation (United Arab Emirates)

Rank	Nation	Gold	Silver	Bronze	Total
1	Russia	7	5	1	13
2	Kazakhstan	3	1	2	6
3	Uzbekistan	2	4	3	9
4	Azerbaijan	1	0	2	3
5	Kyrgyzstan	0	1	1	2
5	Tajikistan	0	1	1	2
7	Belarus	0	1	0	1
8	Armenia	0	0	5	5
9	Georgia	0	0	2	2
9	Spain	0	0	2	2
9	Zambia	0	0	2	2
12	Cuba	0	0	1	1
12	Mali	0	0	1	1
12	Moldova	0	0	1	1
12	Nepal	0	0	1	1
12	Turkmenistan	0	0	1	1
Totals (16 entries)		13	13	26	52

=== Medalists ===
Event	Gold	Silver	Bronze
Minimumweight	Subhan Mamedov; Azerbaijan	Edmond Khudoyan; Russia	Sakhil Alakhverdovi; Georgia
Minimumweight	Subhan Mamedov; Azerbaijan	Edmond Khudoyan; Russia	Temirtas Zhussupov; Kazakhstan
Flyweight	Hasanboy Dusmatov; Uzbekistan	Bair Batlaev; Russia	Rudolf Garboyan; Armenia
Flyweight	Hasanboy Dusmatov; Uzbekistan	Bair Batlaev; Russia	Patrick Chinyemba; Zambia
Bantamweight	Saken Bibossinov; Kazakhstan	Viacheslav Rogozin; Russia	Chandra Bahadur Thapa; Nepal
Bantamweight	Saken Bibossinov; Kazakhstan	Viacheslav Rogozin; Russia	Asilbek Jalilov; Uzbekistan
Featherweight	Orazbek Assylkulov; Kazakhstan	Khusravkhon Rakhimov; Tajikistan	Andrei Peglivanian; Russia
Featherweight	Orazbek Assylkulov; Kazakhstan	Khusravkhon Rakhimov; Tajikistan	Khujanazar Nortojiev; Uzbekistan
Lightweight	Vsevolod Shumkov; Russia	Abdumalik Khalokov; Uzbekistan	Akmal Ubaidov; Tajikistan
Lightweight	Vsevolod Shumkov; Russia	Abdumalik Khalokov; Uzbekistan	Artur Bazeyan; Armenia
Light welterweight	Ilya Popov; Russia	Omar Livaza; Kyrgyzstan	Yertugan Zeinulinov; Kazakhstan
Light welterweight	Ilya Popov; Russia	Omar Livaza; Kyrgyzstan	Emmanuel Katema; Zambia
Welterweight	Asadkhuja Muydinkhujaev; Uzbekistan	Evgenii Kool; Russia	Alexandru Paraschiv; Moldova
Welterweight	Asadkhuja Muydinkhujaev; Uzbekistan	Evgenii Kool; Russia	Hovhannes Bachkov; Armenia
Light middleweight	Ablaikhan Zhussupov; Kazakhstan	Sergei Koldenkov; Russia	Ikhtiar Nishonov; Kyrgyzstan
Light middleweight	Ablaikhan Zhussupov; Kazakhstan	Sergei Koldenkov; Russia	Baýramdurdy Nurmuhammedow; Turkmenistan
Middleweight	Ismail Mutsolgov; Russia	Sabirzhan Akkalykov; Kazakhstan	Djibril Traoré; Mali
Middleweight	Ismail Mutsolgov; Russia	Sabirzhan Akkalykov; Kazakhstan	Fazliddin Erkinboev; Uzbekistan
Light heavyweight	Dzhambulat Bizhamov; Russia	Javokhir Ummataliev; Uzbekistan	Gazimagomed Jalidov; Spain
Light heavyweight	Dzhambulat Bizhamov; Russia	Javokhir Ummataliev; Uzbekistan	Arlen López; Cuba
Cruiserweight	Sharabutdin Ataev; Russia	Aliaksei Alfiorau; Belarus	Georgii Kushitashvili; Georgia
Cruiserweight	Sharabutdin Ataev; Russia	Aliaksei Alfiorau; Belarus	Rafayel Hovhannisyan; Armenia
Heavyweight	Muslim Gadzhimagomedov; Russia	Turabek Khabibullaev; Uzbekistan	Enmanuel Reyes; Spain
Heavyweight	Muslim Gadzhimagomedov; Russia	Turabek Khabibullaev; Uzbekistan	Loren Alfonso; Azerbaijan
Super heavyweight	David Surov; Russia	Arman Makhanov; Uzbekistan	Mahammad Abdullayev; Azerbaijan
Super heavyweight	David Surov; Russia	Arman Makhanov; Uzbekistan	Davit Chaloyan; Armenia

== Participating nations ==
428 athletes from 109 teams participated.

1. Afghanistan (1)
2. Albania (4)
3. Angola (3)
4. Argentina (4)
5. Armenia (13)
6. Australia (11)
7. Azerbaijan (11)
8. Bahamas (1)
9. Bahrain (1)
10. Belarus (5)
11. Bolivia (1)
12. Bosnia and Herzegovina (1)
13. Botswana (3)
14. Brazil (7)
15. Burkina Faso (2)
16. Cambodia (4)
17. Cameroon (4)
18. Cape Verde (5)
19. Comoros (2)
20. Cook Islands (1)
21. Cuba (4)
22. Cyprus (1)
23. Czech Republic (1)
24. DR Congo (6)
25. Ecuador (5)
26. Eswatini (6)
27. Ethiopia (5)
28. Fiji (1)
29. French Polynesia (4)
30. Gabon (1)
31. Gambia (1)
32. Georgia (4)
33. Germany (4)
34. Ghana (3)
35. Greece (6)
36. Guinea (1)
37. Guinea-Bissau (2)
38. Guyana (2)
39. Haiti (1)
40. IBA-PRO (7)
41. IBA-PRO-2 (3)
42. IBN-China (1)
43. IBN-Colombia (3)
44. IBN-England (2)
45. IBN-Estonia (1)
46. IBN-India (13)
47. IBN-Italy (2)
48. IBN-Malta (1)
49. IBN-Poland (1)
50. IBN-Puerto Rico (1)
51. IBN-Romania (1)
52. IBN-Turkey (5)
53. IBN-United States (1)
54. Indonesia (2)
55. Iran (3)
56. Iraq (1)
57. Israel (4)
58. Ivory Coast (1)
59. Kazakhstan (13)
60. Kenya (13)
61. Kyrgyzstan (12)
62. Latvia (3)
63. Lebanon (1)
64. Lesotho (1)
65. Liberia (1)
66. Libya (6)
67. Malawi (2)
68. Malaysia (1)
69. Mali (3)
70. Mauritius (4)
71. Moldova (8)
72. Mongolia (6)
73. Montenegro (1)
74. Mozambique (4)
75. Nepal (5)
76. New Zealand (2)
77. Niger (4)
78. North Macedonia (2)
79. Palestine (3)
80. Papua New Guinea (4)
81. Paraguay (1)
82. Philippines (3)
83. Portugal (5)
84. Russia (13)
85. Rwanda (4)
86. Saint Lucia (2)
87. Samoa (1)
88. Scotland (4)
89. Senegal (2)
90. Serbia (4)
91. Seychelles (3)
92. Sierra Leone (2)
93. Sint Maarten (1)
94. Solomon Islands (2)
95. South Africa (4)
96. Spain (11)
97. Sri Lanka (8)
98. Sweden (1)
99. Tajikistan (13)
100. Tanzania (5)
101. Thailand (4)
102. Tonga (2)
103. Tunisia (3)
104. Turkmenistan (3)
105. Uganda (5)
106. United Arab Emirates (2)
107. Uzbekistan (13)
108. Zambia (7)
109. Zimbabwe (6)

== See also ==
- 2025 IBA Women's World Boxing Championships
- 2025 World Boxing Championships
