= Alejandro Claro =

Cuban boxer

Personal information
- Full name: Alejandro Claro Fiz
- Nationality: Cuba
- Born: 27 February 2001 (age 25) Sancti Spíritus, Cuba
- Height: 1.62 m (5 ft 4 in)

Boxing career
Medal record
Men's amateur boxing
Representing Cuba
World Championships
Bronze medal – third place	2025 Liverpool	50 kg
IBA World Championships
Bronze medal – third place	2023 Tashkent	Minimumweight
Central American and Caribbean Games
Silver medal – second place	2026 Santo Domingo	Flyweight

Alejandro Claro Fiz (Note: In this Spanish name, the first or paternal surname is Claro and the second or maternal family name is Fiz.) (born 27 February 2001) is a Cuban boxer. He competed at the 2023 IBA World Boxing Championships, winning the bronze medal in the minimumweight event. He also competed at the 2024 Summer Olympics in the men's 51 kg event, but was defeated in the quarter-final by Billal Bennama.
