= 2025 IBA World Boxing Championships – Bantamweight =

Bantamweight at the 2025 IBA World Boxing Championships
- Venue: Dubai Duty Free Tennis Stadium
- Location: Dubai, United Arab Emirates
- Dates: 4–13 December
- Competitors: 34 from 34 nations

Medalists
gold medal	Saken Bibossinov	Kazakhstan
silver medal	Viacheslav Rogozin	Russia
bronze medal	Asilbek Jalilov	Uzbekistan
bronze medal	Chandra Bahadur Thapa	Nepal

The Bantamweight competition at the 2025 IBA Men's World Boxing Championships was held from 4 to 13 December 2025.

== Results ==
=== Finals ===
Semifinals
(Russia) Viacheslav Rogozin	5
(Uzbekistan) Asilbek Jalilov	0
(Nepal) Chandra Bahadur Thapa	0
(Kazakhstan) Saken Bibossinov	5

Final
(Russia) Viacheslav Rogozin	2
(Kazakhstan) Saken Bibossinov	5

=== Top half ===
==== Section 1 ====
Round of 64
(Ethiopia) Zekerya Kedir Dawd	0
(Kenya) Shaffi Bakari	5

Round of 32
(Spain) Rafael Lozano	5
(Kenya) Shaffi Bakari	0
(Azerbaijan) Zalim Suleymanov	5
(Eswatini) Khaya Shongwe	0
(Ecuador) Patricio Calero	0
(Kyrgyzstan) Sanzhai Seidekmatov	5
(Rwanda) Aime Iranezeza
(Russia) Viacheslav Rogozin	RSC

Round of 16
(Spain) Rafael Lozano	5
(Azerbaijan) Zalim Suleymanov	0
(Kyrgyzstan) Sanzhai Seidekmatov	0
(Russia) Viacheslav Rogozin	5

Quarterfinals
(Spain) Rafael Lozano	1
(Russia) Viacheslav Rogozin	4

==== Section 2 ====
Round of 64

Round of 32
(Uzbekistan) Asilbek Jalilov	5
(Turkey) Sadai Ahiskali	0
(Ghana) Mohammed Amadu	5
(India) Manoj Kumar	0
(Serbia) Artur Nagapetjan	5
(Portugal) Márcio Cardoso	0
(Mongolia) Gankhuyagiin Gan-Erdene	0
(Cape Verde) Daniel Varela de Pina	5

Round of 16
(Uzbekistan) Asilbek Jalilov	5
(Ghana) Mohammed Amadu	0
(Serbia) Artur Nagapetjan	5
(Cape Verde) Daniel Varela de Pina	0

Quarterfinals
(Uzbekistan) Asilbek Jalilov	4
(Serbia) Artur Nagapetjan	1

=== Bottom half ===
==== Section 3 ====
Round of 64

Round of 32
(Australia) Jawaad Shamshir	RSC
(Zimbabwe) Wisdom Dube
(Iran) Mehdi Kazemi	5
(Cambodia) Rangsey Sao	0
(Indonesia) Yosua Holy Masihor	0
(Nepal) Chandra Bahadur Thapa	5
(Mauritius) Francis Andre Guillaume	0
(Armenia) Davit Yegoryan	5

Round of 16
(Australia) Jawaad Shamshir	1
(Iran) Mehdi Kazemi	4
(Nepal) Chandra Bahadur Thapa	4
(Armenia) Davit Yegoryan	0

Quarterfinals
(Iran) Mehdi Kazemi	0
(Nepal) Chandra Bahadur Thapa	5

==== Section 4 ====
Round of 64
(Mozambique) Manuel Banguine	0
(Tajikistan) Anushervon Fazylov	5

Round of 32
(Kazakhstan) Saken Bibossinov	5
(Botswana) Katlego Keorapetse	0
(United Arab Emirates) Sultan Al-Nuaimi
(Tanzania) Faki Issa	RSC
(Sri Lanka) Ravindu Jayanath Kumara	4
(China) Cheng Weiqing	3
(Tajikistan) Anushervon Fazylov	1
(Zambia) Mwengo Mwale	4

Round of 16
(Kazakhstan) Saken Bibossinov	5
(Tanzania) Faki Issa0
(Sri Lanka) Ravindu Jayanath Kumara	0
(Zambia) Mwengo Mwale	5

Quarterfinals
(Kazakhstan) Saken Bibossinov	5
(Zambia) Mwengo Mwale	0
