= 2025 IBA World Boxing Championships – Minimumweight =

Minimumweight at the 2025 IBA World Boxing Championships
- Venue: Dubai Duty Free Tennis Stadium
- Location: Dubai, United Arab Emirates
- Dates: 5–13 December
- Competitors: 22

Medalists
gold medal	Subhan Mamedov	Azerbaijan
silver medal	Edmond Khudoyan	Russia
bronze medal	Temirtas Zhussupov	Kazakhstan
bronze medal	Sakhil Alakhverdovi	Georgia

The Minimumweight competition at the 2025 IBA Men's World Boxing Championships was held from 5 to 13 December 2025.

== Results ==
=== Finals ===
Semifinals
(Russia) Edmond Khudoyan	5
(Kazakhstan) Temirtas Zhussupov	0
(Azerbaijan) Subhan Mamedov	5
(Georgia (country)) Sakhil Alakhverdovi	0

Final
(Russia) Edmond Khudoyan	3
(Azerbaijan) Subhan Mamedov	4

=== Top half ===
==== Section 1 ====
Round of 32
(Botswana) Kobamelo Molatlhegi	5
(Papua New Guinea) David Ome	0

Round of 16
(Russia) Edmond Khudoyan	5
(Botswana) Kobamelo Molatlhegi	0
(Australia) Kobe Hunt	WO
(Democratic Republic of the Congo) Jeremie Mayala

Quarterfinals
(Russia) Edmond Khudoyan	RSC
(Australia) Kobe Hunt

==== Section 2 ====
Round of 32
(Ethiopia) Abel Abatiye Alemu	0
(Nepal) Lal Prasad Upreti	5
(India) Devendra Singh Solanki	5
(Tanzania) Ally Ngwando	0

Round of 16
(Moldova) Mihai Porombac	0
(Nepal) Lal Prasad Upreti	5
(India) Devendra Singh Solanki	0
(Kazakhstan) Temirtas Zhussupov	4

Quarterfinals
(Nepal) Lal Prasad Upreti	0
(Kazakhstan) Temirtas Zhussupov	5

=== Bottom half ===
==== Section 3 ====
Round of 32
(Kyrgyzstan) Anvarzhan Khodzhiev	5
(Zambia) Nene Maonga	0
(Azerbaijan) Subhan Mamedov	RSC
(Philippines) Joey Canoy

Round of 16
(Uzbekistan) Shodiyorjon Melikuziev	5
(Kyrgyzstan) Anvarzhan Khodzhiev	0
(Azerbaijan) Subhan Mamedov	5
(Tajikistan) Mehron Shafiev	0

Quarterfinals
(Uzbekistan) Shodiyorjon Melikuziev	1
(Azerbaijan) Subhan Mamedov	4

==== Section 4 ====
Round of 32
(Kenya) Silas Onyango	1
(Sri Lanka) Danil Hasika Tissaaratchy	4

Round of 16
(Armenia) Baregham Harutyunyan	4
(Thailand) Teerapat Itan	1
(Sri Lanka) Danil Hasika Tissaaratchy	2
(Georgia (country)) Sakhil Alakhverdovi	5

Quarterfinals
(Armenia) Baregham Harutyunyan	2
(Georgia (country)) Sakhil Alakhverdovi	5
