= Yertugan Zeinulinov =

Kazakh boxer

Personal information
- Nationality: Kazakhstan

Boxing career
Medal record
Men's amateur boxing
Representing Kazakhstan
IBA World Championships
Bronze medal – third place	2025 Dubai	Light welterweight

Yertugan Zeinulinov is a Kazakh boxer. He competed at the 2025 IBA Men's World Boxing Championships, winning the bronze medal in the light welterweight event.
