= Kosovo at the 2018 Summer Youth Olympics =

- IOC code: KOS
- NOC: Olympic Committee of Kosovo
- Website: http://www.noc-kosovo.org/

in Buenos Aires, Argentina 6 – 18 October 2018
- Competitors: 5 in 5 sports
- Medals Ranked 83rd: Gold 0 Silver 0 Bronze 1 Total 1

Summer Youth Olympics appearances (overview)
- 2018

Kosovo participated at the 2018 Summer Youth Olympics in Buenos Aires, Argentina from 6 October to 18 October 2018. This was the country's Youth Olympic Games debut.

== Medals ==
Medals awarded to participants of mixed-NOC (combined) teams are represented in italics. These medals are not counted towards the individual NOC medal tally.

Medal	Name	Sport	Event	Date
Bronze	Erza Muminoviq	Judo	Girls' -44 kg	7 October
Bronze	Erza Muminoviq	Judo	Mixed team	10 October

== Competitors ==
Sports	Boys	Girls	Total	Events
Athletics	1	0	1	1
Boxing	1	0	1	1
Judo	0	1	1	1
Swimming	0	1	1	1
Weightlifting	1	0	1	1
Total	3	2	5	5

== Athletics ==
The athlete Muhamet Ramadani was included in the shot thanks to an initiative by the European Athletics Association.

Athlete	Event	Stage 1		Stage 2		Total	
Athlete	Event	Result	Rank	Result	Rank	Total	Rank
Muhamet Ramadani	Boys' shot put	18.53	9	16.48	15	35.01	12

== Boxing ==
Kosovo received an invitation of the International Olympic Committee to participate in the boxing tournament.

- Boys' 64 kg - Erdonis Maliqi

Boys

Athlete	Event	Preliminary R1	Preliminary R2	Semifinals	Final / RM	Rank
Athlete	Event	Opposition Result	Opposition Result	Opposition Result	Opposition Result	Rank
Erdonis Maliqi	-64 kg	Boulaouja (MAR); L 2–3	Shaiken (KAZ); L WO	Did not advance	Jones (USA); NC	6

== Judo ==
Kosovo qualified one athlete, based on their performance at the U18 European Championship.

- Girls' 44 kg - Erza Muminovic

Individual

Athlete	Event	Round of 16	Quarterfinals	Semifinals	Rep 1	Rep 2	Rep 3	Final / BM	Rank
Athlete	Event	Opposition Result	Opposition Result	Opposition Result	Opposition Result	Opposition Result	Opposition Result	Opposition Result	Rank
Erza Muminoviq	Girls' -44 kg	Bye	Tababi Devi Thangjam (IND); L 00-01s2	Did not advance	Bye	Aleksa Georgieva (BUL); W 10s1-00	Vusala Karimova (AZE); W 10s2-00s2	Anastasia Balaban (UKR); W 10-00	3rd place, bronze medalist(s)

Team

Athletes	Event	Round of 16	Quarterfinals	Semifinals	Final	
Athletes	Event	Opposition Result	Opposition Result	Opposition Result	Opposition Result	Rank
Team Rio de Janeiro; Milana Charygulyyeva (TKM); Yassamine Djellab (ALG); Metka Lobnik (SLO); Erza Muminoviq (KOS); Abrek Naguchev (RUS); Fleury Nihozeko (BUR); Jamshed Sulaimoni (TJK); Sultan Zhenishbekov (KGZ)	Mixed team	Team Sydney (MIX); W 4–3	Team Atlanta (MIX); W 5–4	Team Athens (MIX); L 3–5	Did not advance	3rd place, bronze medalist(s)

== Swimming ==
Kosovo received an invitation of the IOC to participate in the swimming competitions.

- Girls' 100 m Breaststroke - Melisa Zhdrella

Athlete	Event	Heat		Semifinal		Final	
Athlete	Event	Time	Rank	Time	Rank	Time	Rank
Melisa Zhdrella	50 m backstroke	35.44	35	Did not advance			

== Weightlifting ==
Kosovo was given a quota by the tripartite committee to compete in weightlifting.

- Boys' events - Bleron Fetaovski

Athlete	Event	Snatch		Clean & Jerk		Total	Rank
Athlete	Event	Result	Rank	Result	Rank	Total	Rank
Bleron Fetaovski	−77 kg	87	8	103	9	190	9

== See also ==
- Kosovo at the Youth Olympics
