= Charly Suarez =

Filipino boxer (born 1988)

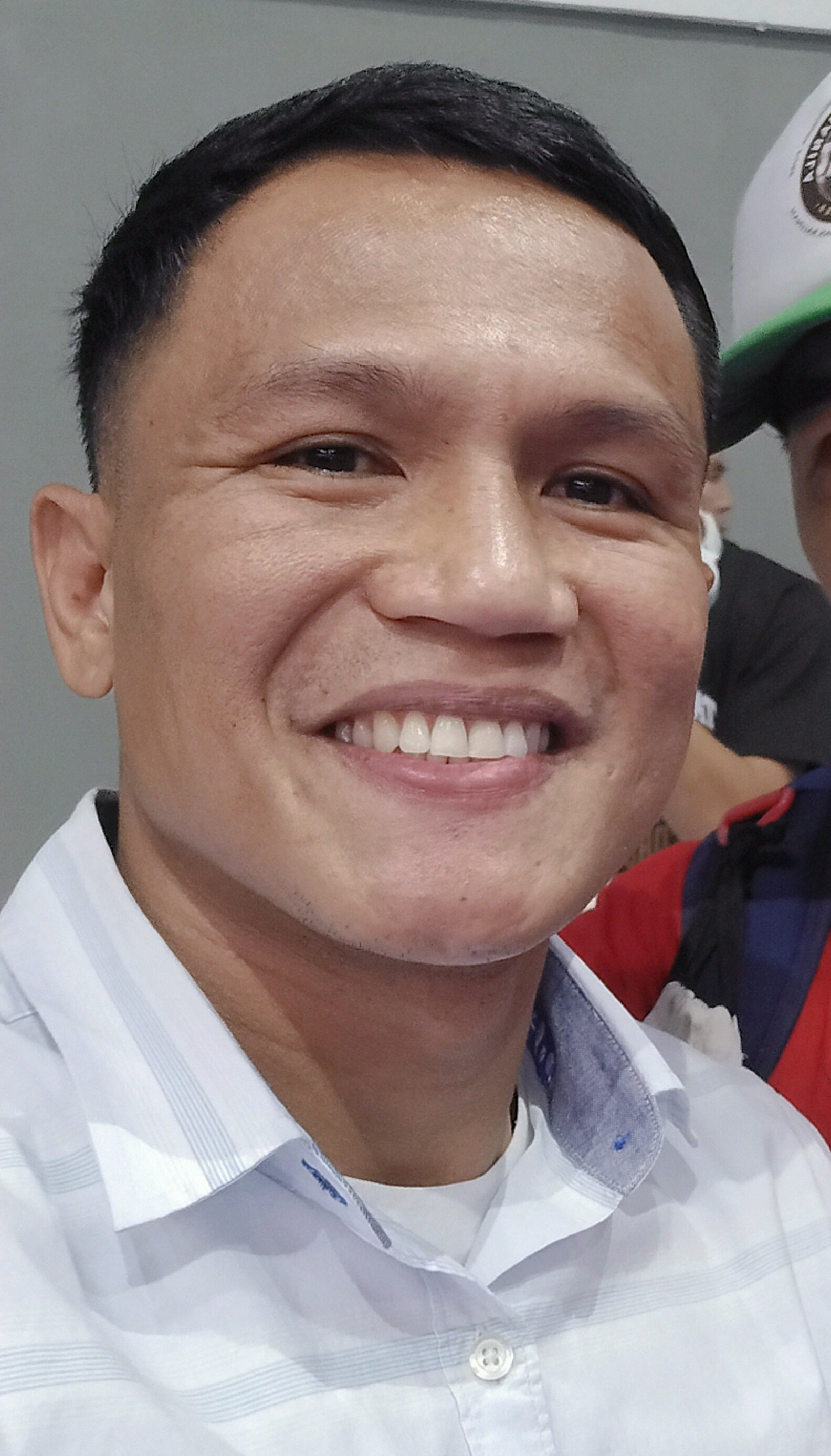
- Suarez in 2025

Personal information
- Nickname: King's Warrior
- Nationality: Filipino
- Born: Charly Coronel Suarez; August 14, 1988 (age 38) San Isidro, Davao del Norte, Philippines
- Height: 168 cm (5 ft 6 in)
- Weight: Super featherweight

Boxing career
- Reach: 188 cm (74 in)
- Stance: Orthodox

Boxing record
- Total fights: 20
- Wins: 19
- Win by KO: 11
- No contests: 1
Medal record
Men's amateur boxing
Representing Philippines
Asian Games
Silver medal – second place	2014 Incheon	Lightweight
Southeast Asian Games
Gold medal – first place	2009 Vientiane	Featherweight
Gold medal – first place	2011 Jakarta	Lightweight
Bronze medal – third place	2017 Kuala Lumpur	Light Welterweight
Gold medal – first place	2019 Metro Manila	Lightweight
President's Cup
Silver medal – second place	2011 Jakarta	Lightweight
Tammer Tournament
Silver medal – second place	2010 Tampere	Bantamweight
Kazakhstan President Cup
Silver medal – second place	2014 Almaty	Lightweight

Charly Coronel Suarez (born August 14, 1988) is a Filipino professional boxer who challenged for the World Boxing Organization (WBO) junior lightweight title in 2025. He is also the WBO International Super Featherweight Champion in 2024 and 2026. As an amateur, Suarez represented the Philippines at the 2016 Summer Olympics.

== Amateur career ==
=== Asian Games ===
2014

- Defeated Elnur Abduraimov (Uzbekistan) PTS (2–1)
- Defeated Akhil Kumar (India) PTS (2–1)
- Defeated Ammar Jabbar (Iraq) PTS (3–0)
- Defeated Obada Al-Kasbeh (Jordan) PTS (2–1)
- Lost to Dorjnyambuugiin Otgondalai (Mongolia) PTS (1–2) (claim silver medal)

=== Southeast Asian Games ===
2009

- Defeated Manuel Batisia (Timor-Leste) KO
- Defeated Wuttichai Masuk (Thailand) PTS (13–5)
- Defeated Phal Sophat (Cambodia) KO (claim gold medal)

2011

- Defeated Sailom Adi (Thailand)
- Defeated Matius Mandiangan (Indonesia) PTS (26–7) (claim gold medal)

2017

- 1st round bye
- Defeated Khir Akyazlan Bin Azmi (Malaysia) PTS (4–1)
- Lost to Wuttichai Masuk (Thailand) PTS (claim bronze medal)

2019

- Defeated Paing Min Arkar (Myanmar) RSC
- Defeated Vu Thanh Dat (Vietnam) PTS (5–0)
- Defeated Khunatip Pidnuch (Thailand) PTS (5–0) (claim gold medal)

== Professional career ==
Suarez, a 2016 Olympian, turned professional in 2019 and has made up for his late start in the pros, fighting five times in 2022 against solid competition. He stopped Indonesian Defry Palulu in two rounds on December in Vietnam. The Paul Fleming fight was his second straight fight abroad, winning a 12-round TKO claiming four titles.

Suarez together with Chavit Singson signed a contract with Top Rank Inc. on July 1, 2023, in preparation for the fight against Yohan "La Fiera" Vasquez of the Dominican Republic on August 26, 2023, at Hard Rock Hotel and Casino in Tulsa, Oklahoma USA. Charly Suarez bests Yohan Vasquez by unanimous decision and still remain undefeated the scores were 98–92, 98-92 and 97–93.

Suarez was scheduled to face Andres Cortes for the vacant WBO International super featherweight titlein Glendale, Arizona, on September 20, 2024. On September 12, 2024, it was reported that Cortes withdrew due to injury and was replaced by Jorge Castaneda. Suarez won by stoppage in the third round.

=== WBO super featherweight championship ===
==== Suarez vs. Navarrete ====
On March 19, 2025, it was reported that Emanuel Navarrete would make a fourth defense of his WBO title against Suarez, who was ranked first by the WBO. The fight was scheduled to take place on May 10, 2025, airing live on ESPN at the Pechanga Arena in San Diego. The bout ended in controversy by the eighth round, as Navarrete was unable to continue after suffering a cut over his left eyebrow, which referee Edward Collantes determined to be the result of an accidental clash of heads; as a result, the fight went to the scorecards, which read 78–75, 77–76, and 77–76 in favor of Navarrete. However, new footage released sometime after the fight suggested that the cut may have been caused by a punch from Suarez in the sixth round, and if the referee had ruled it as such, then Suarez would have won by TKO. Subsequently, team Suarez appealed to the California State Athletic Commission (CSAC). On June 2, 2025, the CSAC overturned Navarrete's unanimous technical decision win to a no contest, prompting the WBO to order a rematch.

Suarez returned to winning ways in his next fight, defeating Manuel Ávila by technical knockout in the first round to claim the vacant WBO International super-featherweight title at the Orange Show Events Center in San Bernardino, California, United States, on July 18, 2026.

== Professional boxing record ==
20 fights	19 wins	0 losses
By knockout	11	0
By decision	8	0
No contests	1	

No.	Result	Record	Opponent	Type	Round, time	Date	Location	Notes
20	Win	19–0 (1)	Manuel Ávila	TKO	1 (10), 2:31	18 Jul 2026	Orange Show Events Center, San Bernardino, California, U.S.	Won vacant WBO International super featherweight title
19	NC	18–0 (1)	Emanuel Navarrete	NC	8 (12), 0:01	10 May 2025	Pechanga Arena, San Diego, California, U.S.	For WBO super featherweight title; Originally a unanimous TD win for Navarrete, later changed to NC due to an incorrect referee call
18	Win	18–0	Jorge Castaneda	TKO	3 (10), 2:22	20 Sep 2024	Desert Diamond Arena, Glendale, Arizona, U.S.	Won vacant WBO International super featherweight title
17	Win	17–0	Luis Coria	UD	8	13 Apr 2024	American Bank Center, Corpus Christi, Texas, U.S.	
16	Win	16–0	Yohan Vasquez	UD	10	26 Aug 2023	Hard Rock Hotel & Casino, Tulsa, Oklahoma, U.S.	
15	Win	15–0	Paul Fleming	TKO	12 (12) 1:58	15 Mar 2023	Kevin Betts Stadium, Mount Druitt, Sydney, Australia	Won WBA Oceania, WBC-ABCO, IBO Inter-Continental and vacant IBF Inter-Continental super featherweight titles
14	Win	14–0	Defry Palulu	TKO	2 (12) 3:00	10 Dec 2022	The Grand Ho Tram Strip, Vung Tau, Vietnam	Won vacant IBF Asia super featherweight title
13	Win	13–0	Carlo Magali	UD	12	23 Oct 2022	The Flash Grand Ballroom of the Elorde Sports Complex, Parañaque, Philippines	Retained WBA Asia super featherweight title; Won Philippines GAB super featherweight title
12	Win	12–0	Mark John Yap	KO	3 (12) 2:25	14 Jan 2022	The Flash Grand Ballroom of the Elorde Sports Complex, Parañaque, Philippines	
11	Win	11–0	Junny Salogaol	UD	12	30 Apr 2021	Barangay Manga Elementary School Covered Court, Tagbilaran, Philippines	
10	Win	10–0	Tomjune Mangubat	TKO	12 (12) 0:45	12 Mar 2022	The Flash Grand Ballroom of the Elorde Sports Complex, Parañaque, Philippines	Won vacant WBA Asia super featherweight title
9	Win	9–0	Delmar Pellio	TKO	2 (10), 2:09	4 Dec 2021	Robinson's Mall Atrium, General Santos, Philippines	
8	Win	8–0	Lorence Rosas	KO	4 (8)	4 Sep 2020	Urdaneta Cultural Sports Complex, Urdaneta City, Philippines	
7	Win	7–0	Eduardo Mancito	UD	10	3 Jul 2020	Urdaneta Cultural Sports Complex, Urdaneta, Philippines	
6	Win	6–0	Pablito Canada	TKO	4 (6)	1 May 2020	Urdaneta Cultural Sports Complex, Urdaneta, Philippines	
5	Win	5–0	Jon Jon Estrada	UD	10	13 Feb 2020	2nd Floor, Mega Mart Burgos Poblacion Norte, Paniqui, Philippines	
4	Win	4–0	Dave Barlas	TKO	3 (8), 0:53	7 Feb 2020	Santo Domingo, Ilocos Sur, Philippines	
3	Win	3–0	Virgil Puton	TKO	1 (10), 1:41	24 Aug 2019	San Andres Civic & Sports Center, Manila, Philippines	
2	Win	2–0	Justin Cabarles	KO	2 (8), 2:53	5 Mar 2019	Dujali Gymnasium, Braulio E. Dujali, Philippines	
1	Win	1–0	Ernesto Cagampang	TKO	2 (6), 0:24	1 Jan 2019	Barangay Tablon Gymnasium (Covered Court), Cagayan de Oro, Philippines	

== Titles in boxing ==
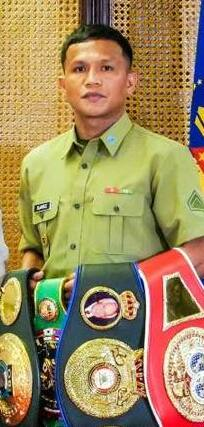
Suarez with some of his championship belts. April 2023.

=== Regional/International titles ===
- WBO International Super Featherweight title (130 lbs)
- IBF Inter-Continental Super Featherweight title (130 lbs)
- IBO Inter-Continental Super Featherweight title (130 lbs)
- WBA Oceania Super Featherweight title (130 lbs)
- WBC Asian Boxing Council Super Featherweight title (130 lbs)
- WBA Asia Super Featherweight title (130 lbs)
- GAB Super Featherweight title (130 lbs)
