= Omar Livaza =

Kyrgyz boxer

Personal information
- Nationality: Kyrgyzstan
- Born: 2003 or 2004 (age 21–22)

Boxing career
Medal record
Men's amateur boxing
Representing Kyrgyzstan
IBA World Championships
Silver medal – second place	2025 Dubai	Light welterweight

Omar Livaza (born 2003/2004) is a Kyrgyz boxer. He competed at the 2025 IBA Men's World Boxing Championships, winning the silver medal in the light welterweight event.
