= Chandra Bahadur Thapa (boxer) =

Nepalese boxer

Personal information
- Nationality: Nepal

Boxing career
Medal record
Men's amateur boxing
Representing Nepal
IBA World Championships
Bronze medal – third place	2025 Dubai	Bantamweight

Chandra Bahadur Thapa is a Nepalese boxer. He competed at the 2025 IBA Men's World Boxing Championships, winning the bronze medal in the bantamweight event.
