= Temirtas Zhussupov =

Kazakh boxer (born 1988)

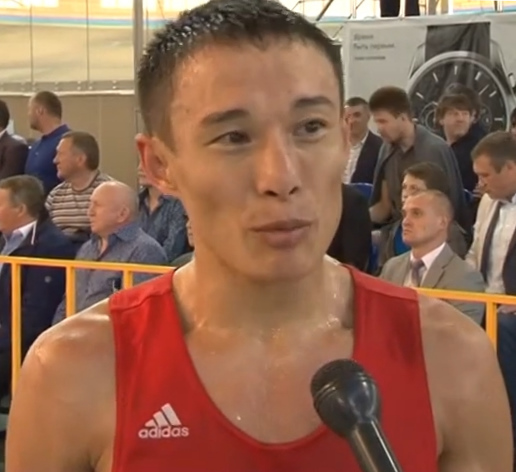
- Zhussupov in 2016

Personal information
- Nationality: Kazakhstan
- Born: 15 January 1988 (age 38) Tassuat, Kazakh SSR, Soviet Union

Boxing career
Medal record
Men's amateur boxing
Representing Kazakhstan
IBA World Championships
Gold medal – first place	2021 Belgrade	Minimumweight
Bronze medal – third place	2025 Dubai	Minimumweight
Military Championships
Gold medal – first place	2021 Moscow	Minimumweight

Temirtas Zhussupov (born 15 January 1988) is a Kazakh boxer. He competed at the 2021 AIBA World Boxing Championships, winning the gold medal in the minimumweight event. He also competed at the 2025 IBA Men's World Boxing Championships, winning the bronze medal in the same event.

Zhussupov was named the Best Boxer of the Year by the Kazakhstan Boxing Federation in 2018.
