= Otha Jones III =

American boxer (born 2000)

Personal information
- Born: February 6, 2000 (age 26) Toledo, Ohio, U.S.
- Height: 5 ft 10 in (178 cm)
- Weight: Lightweight

Boxing career
- Stance: Orthodox

Boxing record
- Total fights: 8
- Wins: 6
- Win by KO: 2
- Losses: 1
- Draws: 1

Otha Jones III (born February 6, 2000) is an American professional boxer. As an amateur, he won two U.S. National Junior Championships, one U.S. National Youth Championships and represented the United States at the 2018 Youth Olympic Games at light welterweight.

== Early and personal life ==
Otha Jones III was born on February 6, 2000, in Toledo, Ohio. Before dedicating himself to boxing, Jones participated in wrestling, winning three state titles between the ages of 8 and 12. He first got into boxing at the age of 8 after his friend, Wayne "Pretty Boy Bam Bam" Lawrence Jr., also eight at the time, became a viral hit on YouTube after posting a video of himself boxing. Jones said of the video, "We were like eight years old and he [Bam Bam] got a million views on YouTube [by posting a video of himself boxing]. I was thinking, ‘I want a million views, too, man!’. So, I told my dad and ever since then, I’ve been in the gym." Jones is trained by his father, Otha Jones II and his older brother, Roshown Jones.

His older sister, Oshae Jones, is also a professional boxer.

== Amateur career ==
During an amateur career in which he compiled a record of 283–13, Jones won multiple national championships at the junior and youth level.

== Professional career ==
On January 16, 2019, it was announced that Jones had signed a promotional contract with Eddie Hearn's Matchroom Boxing USA. He made his professional debut on March 9, 2019, winning via unanimous decision (UD) over six rounds against Girorgi Gelashvili at the Turning Stone Resort Casino in Verona, New York. Two judges scored the bout 58–55 while the third scored it 59–53. His second fight came three months later on June 21, scoring a first-round technical knockout (TKO) victory over Michael Horabin at the York Hall in London. Eight days after his bout with Horabin, Jones fought Matias Agustin Arriagada on June 29 at the Dunkin' Donuts Center in Providence, Rhode Island, winning by unanimous decision. All three judges scored the bout 60–54 in favour of Jones. The fight was part of the undercard for Demetrius Andrade's WBO title defense against Maciej Sulęcki. On October 12, 2019, as part of the undercard for Dmitry Bivol's WBA title defense against Lenin Castillo, Jones defeated Eric Manriquez by majority decision at the Wintrust Arena in Chicago. Two judges scored the bout in favour of Jones with 40–36 and 39–37, while the third scored it a draw at 38–38.

== Professional boxing record ==
7 fights	5 wins	1 loss
By knockout	2	0
By decision	3	1
Draws	1	

No.	Result	Record	Opponent	Type	Round, time	Date	Location	Notes
7	Loss	5–1–1	Jorge Castaneda	MD	8	Apr 17, 2021	Seminole Hard Rock Hotel & Casino, Hollywood, Florida, U.S.	
6	Draw	5–0–1	Kevin Montiel Mendoza	SD	6	Oct 23, 2020	Gimnasio TV Azteca, Mexico City, Mexico	
5	Win	5–0	Juan Santiago	TKO	2 (6), 1:29	Jan 30, 2020	Meridian at Island Gardens, Miami, Florida, U.S.	
4	Win	4–0	Eric Manriquez	MD	4	Oct 12, 2019	Wintrust Arena, Chicago, Illinois, U.S.	
3	Win	3–0	Matias Agustin Arriagada	UD	6	Jun 29, 2019	Dunkin' Donuts Center, Providence, Rhode Island, U.S.	
2	Win	2–0	Michael Horabin	TKO	1 (6), 1:40	Jun 21, 2019	York Hall, London, England	
1	Win	1–0	Giorgi Gelashvili	UD	6	Mar 9, 2019	Turning Stone Resort Casino, Verona, New York, U.S.	
