= Samet Gümüş =

Turkish boxer (born 2001)

Personal information
- Born: 9 May 2001 (age 25) Kocaeli, Turkey
- Height: 1.60 m (5 ft 3 in)
- Weight: Flyweight

Boxing career
Medal record
Men's amateur boxing
Representing Turkey
European Games
Silver medal – second place	2023 Kraków-Małopolska	Flyweight
EUBC European Championships
Gold medal – first place	2024 Belgrade	Flyweight
EB European Championships
Bronze medal – third place	2026 Sofia	50 kg
Mediterranean Games
Bronze medal – third place	2022 Oran	Flyweight
European U22 Championships
Gold medal – first place	2022 Poreč	Bantamweight

Samet Gümüş (born 9 May 2001) is a European champion Turkish boxer competing in the flyweight (51 kg) division.

== Boxing career ==
Samet faced Billal Bennama, a French athlete of Algerian origin, in the men's 51 kg final match at the 3rd European Games at Nowy Targ Arena in Nowy Targ, Poland. Although Samet won the first round, he was defeated in the second and third rounds, thereby losing the match and taking the silver medal. By reaching the final, he had earned a quota for the 2024 Paris Olympics.
