= Yauheni Karmilchyk =

Belarusian boxer

Personal information
- Nationality: Belarus

Boxing career
Medal record
Men's amateur boxing
Representing Belarus
IBA World Championships
Bronze medal – third place	2021 Belgrade	Minimumweight

Yauheni Karmilchyk is a Belarusian boxer. He competed at the 2021 AIBA World Boxing Championships, winning the bronze medal in the minimumweight event.
