= Narek Hovhannisyan =

Armenian footballer (born 2006)

Personal information
- Date of birth: 6 August 2006 (age 20)
- Place of birth: Yerevan, Armenia
- Height: 1.71 m (5 ft 7 in)
- Position: Winger

Team information
- Current team: Lechia Gdańsk
- Number: 20

Youth career
- Avan Football Academy

Senior career*
Years	Team	Apps	(Gls)
2022–2024	BKMA Yerevan-2	44	(13)
2024–2026	BKMA Yerevan	78	(16)
2026–	Lechia Gdańsk	2	(0)

International career^{‡}
2022	Armenia U16	1	(1)
2022	Armenia U17	5	(0)
2022–2024	Armenia U19	14	(2)
2024–	Armenia U21	10	(0)
2026–	Armenia	8	(0)
- * Club domestic league appearances and goals as of 15:25, 9 November 2026 (UTC) ‡ National team caps and goals as of 17:42, 15 November 2026 (UTC)

Narek Hovhannisyan (Armenian: Նարեկ Հովհաննիսյան; born 6 August 2006) is an Armenian professional footballer who plays as a winger for I liga club Lechia Gdańsk and the Armenia national team.

== Club career ==
On 10 September 2026, Hovhannisyan signed a contract with Lechia Gdańsk until 2031.

== International career ==
Hovhannisyan made his debut for Armenia national team on 29 March 2026 in a friendly against Belarus.

== Career statistics ==
=== International ===
As of match played 15 November 2026

Appearances and goals by national team and year
National team	Year	Apps	Goals
Armenia
Armenia	2026	8	0
Total		8	0
