= Rudolf Garboyan =

Armenian boxer

Personal information
- Nationality: Armenia

Boxing career
Medal record
Men's amateur boxing
Representing Armenia
IBA World Championships
Bronze medal – third place	2025 Dubai	Flyweight
EB European Championships
Bronze medal – third place	2026 Sofia	50 kg
European U23 Championships
Gold medal – first place	2024 Sofia	Flyweight

Rudolf Garboyan is an Armenian boxer. He competed at the 2025 IBA Men's World Boxing Championships, winning the bronze medal in the flyweight event.
