= Edmond Khudoyan =

Russian boxer

Personal information
- Other names: Edmond Khudoian
- Nationality: Russia
- Born: Edmond Gagikovich Khudoyan; 16 July 1996 (age 29) Zlatoust, Russia

Boxing career
Medal record
Men's amateur boxing
Representing Russia
IBA World Championships
Silver medal – second place	2025 Dubai	Minimumweight
Bronze medal – third place	2023 Tashkent	Minimumweight
European Championships
Gold medal – first place	2024 Belgrade	Minimumweight

Edmond Gagikovich Khudoyan (Russian: Эдмонд Гагикович Худоян; born 16 July 1996) is a Russian boxer. He competed at the 2023 IBA Men's World Boxing Championships, winning the bronze medal in the minimumweight event. He also competed at the 2024 European Amateur Boxing Championships, winning the gold medal in the same event.
