= Aqeel Ahmed (boxer) =

Scottish boxer

Personal information
- Full name: Aqeel Bashir Ahmed
- National team: Scotland
- Born: 28 July 1992 (age 32); Dundee, Scotland

Sport
- Country: Scotland
- Sport: Boxing

Achievements and titles
- Commonwealth finals: Glasgow 2014

Aqeel Bashir Ahmed (born 28 July 1992) is an amateur boxer from Dundee, Scotland. He represented Scotland in the Commonwealth Games in Glasgow in 2014 and again in Gold Coast in 2018. He is the current British Champion 2016, having defended it from the previous year.

In May 2019, Ahmed was selected to compete for Great Britain and Northern Ireland at the 2019 European Games in Minsk, Belarus.

== Personal life ==
Ahmed was born and raised in Dundee in Scotland and currently lives in Motherwell. He is of Pakistani descent.
