= Khusravkhon Rakhimov =

Tajikistani boxer

Personal information
- Nationality: Tajikistan
- Born: 2001 or 2002 (age 23–24)

Boxing career
Medal record
Men's amateur boxing
Representing Tajikistan
IBA World Championships
Silver medal – second place	2025 Dubai	Featherweight

Khusravkhon Rakhimov (born 2001/2002) is a Tajikistani boxer. He competed at the 2025 IBA Men's World Boxing Championships, winning the silver medal in the featherweight event.
