= Wuttichai Yurachai =

Thai boxer

Personal information
- Nationality: Thailand

Boxing career
Medal record
Men's amateur boxing
Representing Thailand Boxing Federation
IBA World Championships
Silver medal – second place	2021 Belgrade	Minimumweight

Wuttichai Yurachai is a Thai boxer. He competed at the 2021 AIBA World Boxing Championships, winning the silver medal in the minimumweight event.
