= Sakhil Alakhverdovi =

Georgian boxer (born 1999)

Personal information
- Nationality: Georgian
- Born: 9 January 1999 (age 27) Kvemo Kartli, Georgia

Sport
- Sport: Boxing
Medal record
Men's amateur boxing
Representing Georgia
IBA World Championships
Silver medal – second place	2023 Tashkent	Minimumweight
Bronze medal – third place	2021 Belgrade	Minimumweight
Bronze medal – third place	2025 Dubai	Minimumweight
European Championships
Gold medal – first place	2022 Yerevan	Minimumweight

Sakhil Alakhverdovi (born 9 January 1999) is a Georgian boxer. He competed in the men's flyweight division at the 2020 Summer Olympics. He then contested the men's minimumweight division at the 2021 World Championships, where he won the bronze medal.
