= Torsten May =

German boxer (born 1969)

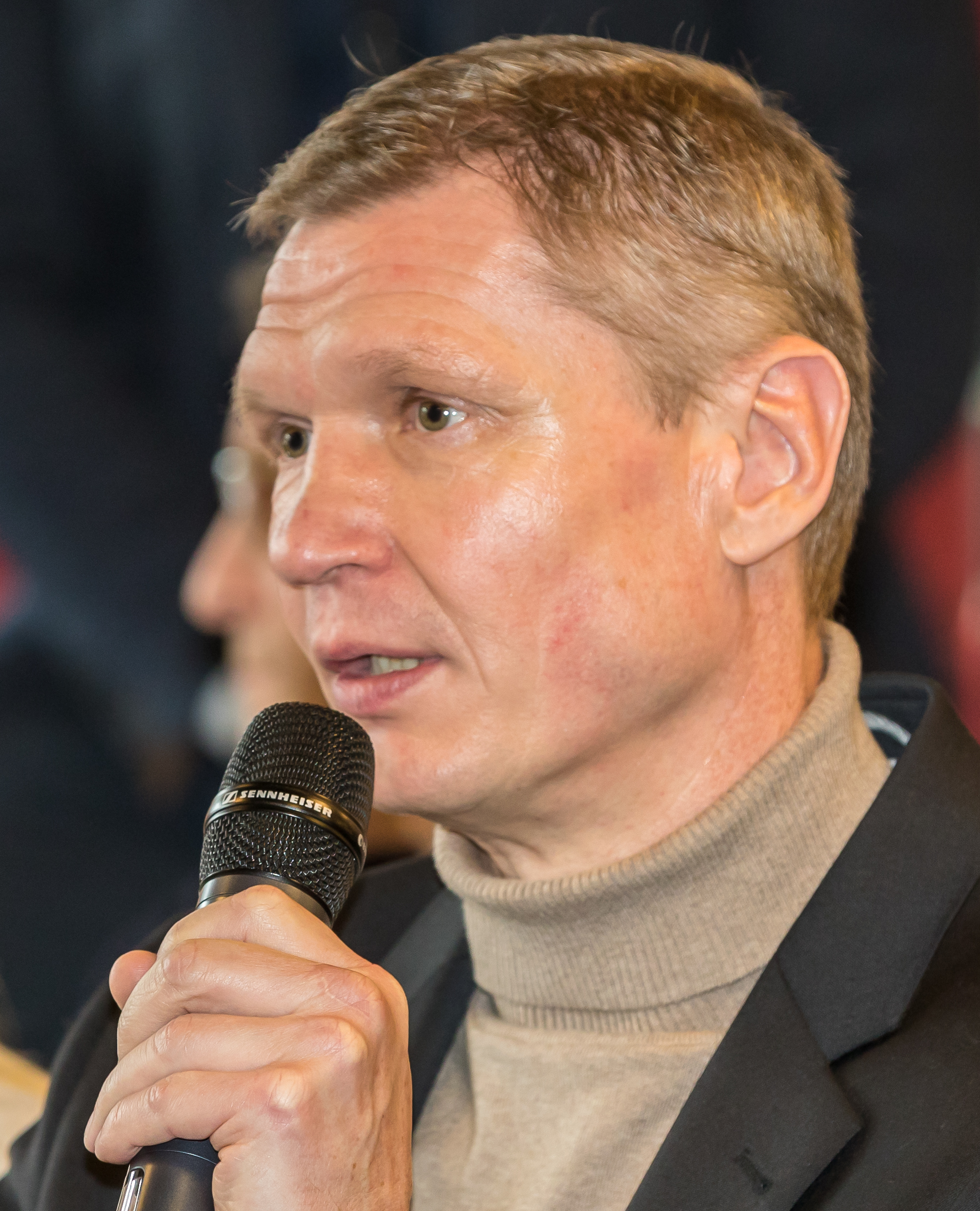
- Torsten May, 2019

Medal record

Representing Germany

Men's Boxing

Olympic Games
Gold medal – first place	1992 Barcelona	Light Heavyweight

World Amateur Championships
Gold medal – first place	1991 Sydney	Light Heavyweight

Torsten May (born September 10, 1969, in Glauchau, Saxony) is a former German boxer, who won the Light Heavyweight Gold medal at the 1992 Summer Olympics. He challenged once for the IBF cruiserweight championship in 2006.

== Amateur career ==
- 1991 German National Light Heavyweight champion
- 1991 Won World Championship as a Light Heavyweight in Sydney, Australia. Results were:
  - Defeated Patrice Aouissi (France) points
  - Defeated Orestes Solano (Cuba) points
  - Defeated Mehmet Gurgen (Turkey) points
  - Defeated Andrey Kurnyavka (Russia) points
- Olympic Gold Medalist in Barcelona 1992 as a Light Heavyweight. Results were:
  - Defeated Gil-Nam Kim (North Korea) points
  - Defeated Dale Brown (boxer) (Canada) points
  - Defeated Montell Griffin (United States) when controversially he was credited some of Griffin's points
  - Defeated Wojciech Bartnik (Poland) points
  - Defeated Rostislav Zaulitchny (Unified Team/ C.I.S) points

== Professional career ==
May began his professional career the following year and won his first 15 bouts in the cruiserweight division, setting up a fight for the vacant IBF cruiserweight title against Adolpho Washington. Washington won by a narrow unanimous decision, a loss which May avenged in 1999 via a 9th-round technical decision after Washington lost his title. May never again fought for a title, and lost via TKO in the 8th round to Alexander Gurov in 2001 in a match that ended May's career.

== Professional boxing record ==
22 Wins (12 knockouts, 10 decisions), 3 Losses (2 knockouts, 1 decision)
Result	Record	Opponent	Type	Round	Date	Location	Notes
Loss	29-3-1	(Ukraine) Alexander Gurov	TKO	8	21/04/2001	Erfurt, Germany	WBA Intercontinental/IBF Intercontinental/EBU Cruiserweight Titles.
Win	5-0	(Russia) Yan Kulkov	PTS	8	25/11/2000	Hannover, Germany	
Win	8-0-1	(Estonia) Valeri Semiskur	TKO	3	03/06/2000	Karlsruhe, Germany	IBF Intercontinental Cruiserweight Title.
Win	24-2	(Russia) Alexey Ilyin	MD	12	27/11/1999	Düsseldorf, Germany	EBU Cruiserweight Title.
Win	27-6-2	(United States) Adolpho Washington	TD	9	05/06/1999	Frankfurt, Germany	IBF Intercontinental cruiserweight title
Win	18-2	(France) Pascal Warusfel	PTS	10	10/10/1998	Vienna, Austria	
Loss	17-4-1	(Switzerland) Stefan Angehrn	TKO	9	13/12/1997	Düsseldorf, Germany	IBF Intercontinental Cruiserweight Title.
Win	23-9	(United States) Matthew Charleston	TKO	5	18/10/1997	Vienna, Austria	
Win	13-8	(United States) Jason Nicholson	PTS	10	15/02/1997	Vienna, Austria	
Loss	25-3-2	(United States) Adolpho Washington	UD	12	31/08/1996	Palma de Mallorca, Spain	For vacant IBF cruiserweight title
Win	24-8	(United States) Andrew Maynard	KO	10	20/04/1996	Düsseldorf, Germany	
Win	37-3-3	(United States) Gary "Tiger" Steiger	TKO	6	23/03/1996	(United States) New York City, U.S.	
Win	6-13	(United Kingdom) Bobbie Joe Edwards	PTS	8	29/01/1996	(United Kingdom) Piccadilly, London, England	
Win	32-8	(United States) Art Jimmerson	KO	5	09/09/1995	Bielefeld, Germany	
Win	16-13	(United States) Tim "Scrap Iron" Johnson	KO	2	17/06/1995	(United States) Las Vegas, Nevada, U.S.	Johnson knocked out at 2:09 of the second round.
Win	8-5-2	(United States) Fred "Kip" Adams	KO	3	27/05/1995	Dortmund, Germany	
Win	24-4	(Mexico) Saul Montana	UD	10	25/03/1995	Düsseldorf, Germany	
Win	20-5-2	(United States) Jason Waller	TKO	6	26/11/1994	Wuppertal, Germany	
Win	20-8-3	(United States) Dale "Lunch Pail" Jackson	TKO	5	18/06/1994	(United States) Chicago, Illinois, U.S.	Referee stopped the bout at 1:09 of the fifth round.
Win	32-7-7	(Germany) Ralf Rocchigiani	PTS	10	07/05/1994	Koblenz, Germany	BDB German Cruiserweight Title.
Win	15-19-6	(United Kingdom) Tony Booth	UD	6	26/03/1994	Dortmund, Germany	
Win	26-6-1	(United States) Vincent Boulware	SD	8	26/02/1994	(United States) San Jose, California, U.S.	
Win	--	Ludmil Popov	KO	1	11/12/1993	Düsseldorf, Germany	
Win	9-25-1	(United States) Bruce "The Truce" Johnson	TKO	4	16/10/1993	Koblenz, Germany	
Win	4-17-1	(United States) Eric "Ice" Cole	KO	1	18/09/1993	Düsseldorf, Germany	Cole knocked out at 2:35 of the first round.
