= Boxing at the 1992 Summer Olympics – Light heavyweight =

Light heavyweight boxing at the Games of the XXV Olympiad
- Venue: Pavelló Club Joventut Badalona
- Dates: 29 July – 9 August 1992
- Competitors: 26 from 26 nations

Medalists
| 1st place, gold medalist(s) | | Torsten May | Germany |
| 2nd place, silver medalist(s) | | Rostyslav Zaulychnyi | Unified Team |
| 3rd place, bronze medalist(s) | | Wojciech Bartnik | Poland |
| 3rd place, bronze medalist(s) | | Zoltán Béres | Hungary |

The men's light heavyweight event was part of the boxing programme at the 1992 Summer Olympics. The weight class allowed boxers of up to 81 kilograms to compete. The competition was held from 29 July to 9 August 1992. 26 boxers from 26 nations competed.

== Medalists ==
| Gold | Torsten May; Germany |
| Silver | Rostyslav Zaulychnyi; Unified Team |
| Bronze | Wojciech Bartnik; Poland |
| Bronze | Zoltán Béres; Hungary |

== Results ==
The following boxers took part in the event:

| Rank | Name | Country |
|---|---|---|
| 1 | Torsten May | Germany |
| 2 | Rostyslav Zaulychnyi | Unified Team |
| 3T | Wojciech Bartnik | Poland |
| 3T | Zoltán Béres | Hungary |
| 5T | Stephen Wilson | Great Britain |
| 5T | Roland Raforme | Seychelles |
| 5T | Montell Griffin | United States |
| 5T | Ángel Espinosa | Cuba |
| 9T | Mika Masoe | American Samoa |
| 9T | Jacklord Jacobs | Nigeria |
| 9T | Asghar Ali Changezi | Pakistan |
| 9T | Patrice Aouissi | France |
| 9T | Go Yo-da | South Korea |
| 9T | Dale Brown | Canada |
| 9T | Mohamed Ben Guesmia | Algeria |
| 9T | Roberto Castelli | Italy |
| 17T | Paulo Mwaselle | Tanzania |
| 17T | Rick Timperi | Australia |
| 17T | Manuel Verde | Mexico |
| 17T | France Mabiletsa | Botswana |
| 17T | Bai Chongguang | China |
| 17T | Damdingiin Zul | Mongolia |
| 17T | Kim Gil-nam | North Korea |
| 17T | Raimundo Yant | Venezuela |
| 17T | Alex González | Puerto Rico |
| 17T | Mehmet Gürgen | Turkey |

=== First round ===
- Stephen Wilson (GBR) – BYE
- Mika Masoe (ASA) – BYE
- Rostyslav Zaulychnyi (EUN) – BYE
- Jacklord Jacobs (NGA) – BYE
- Zoltán Béres (HUN) def. Paolo Mwaselle (TAN), 30:13
- Roland Raforme (SEY) def. Rick Temperi (AUS), 27:7
- Patrice Aouissi (FRA) def. Manuel Verde (MEX), RSCH-3 (01:46)
- Montell Griffin (USA) def. France Mabiletsa (BOT), 10:4
- Ko Yo-Da (KOR) def. Bai Chongguang (CHN), 18:4
- Robert Brown (CAN) def. Damidin Zul (MGL), RSCH-2 (03:00)
- Torsten May (GER) def. Kim Gil-Nam (PRK), 9:1
- Mohamed Benguesmia (ALG) def. Raimundo Yant (VEN), 15:11
- Wojciech Bartnik (POL) def. Alex González (PUR), 6:3
- Angel Espinosa (CUB) def. Mehmet Gürgen (TUR), RSC-3 (01:06)
- Roberto Castelli (ITA) def. Simon Maebele (CAM), WO
- Asghar Ali Changezi (PAK) def. Ali Kazemi (IRN), WO

=== Second round ===
- Stephen Wilson (GBR) def. Mika Masoe (ASA), 12:8
- Rostyslav Zaulychnyi (EUN) def. Jacklord Jacobs (NGA), 16:8
- Zoltán Béres (HUN) def. Asghar Ali Changezi (PAK), RSCH-1 (01:17)
- Roland Raforme (SEY) def. Patrice Aouissi (FRA), RSCH-2 (02:19)
- Montell Griffin (USA) def. Ko Yo-Da (KOR), 16:1
- Torsten May (GER) def. Robert Brown (CAN), 7:1
- Wojciech Bartnik (POL) def. Mohamed Benguesmia (ALG), 14:3
- Angel Espinosa (CUB) def. Roberto Castelli (ITA), RSCH-1 (02:34)

=== Quarterfinals ===
- Rostyslav Zaulychnyi (EUN) def. Stephen Wilson (GBR), 13:0
- Zoltán Béres (HUN) def. Roland Raforme (SEY), 11:3
- Torsten May (GER) def. Montell Griffin (USA), 6:4
- Wojciech Bartnik (POL) def. Angel Espinosa (CUB), 9:3

=== Semifinals ===
- Rostyslav Zaulychnyi (EUN) def. Zoltán Béres (HUN), RSC-3 (02:51)
- Torsten May (GER) def. Wojciech Bartnik (POL), 8:6

=== Final ===
- Torsten May (GER) def. Rostyslav Zaulychnyi (EUN), 8:3
