= Alexander Gurov (boxer) =

Ukrainian boxer

Personal information
- Nationality: Ukrainian
- Born: 7 April 1971 (age 55) Mariupol, Ukraine
- Height: 6 ft 5 in (1.96 m)
- Weight: Cruiserweight

Boxing career
- Reach: 199 cm (78 in)
- Stance: Southpaw

Boxing record
- Total fights: 49
- Wins: 42
- Win by KO: 33
- Losses: 6
- Draws: 1
- No contests: 0

Alexander Gurov (Ukrainian: Олександр Гуров) is a Ukrainian professional boxer and former WBO Asia-Pacific cruiserweight champion. He formerly held the EBU cruiserweight boxing title.

Gurov was defeated in December 2005 by David Haye losing the EBU European title in just 45 seconds.

== Professional boxing record ==
42 Wins (36 knockouts, 6 decisions), 6 Losses (5 knockouts, 1 decision), 1 Draw
Result	Record	Opponent	Type	Round	Date	Location	Notes
Win	--	(Ukraine) Volodymyr Afanasiev	TKO	2	18/03/2011	Yenakiyevo, Ukraine	
Win	14-13	(Belgium) Vitali Shkraba	TKO	4	21/08/2007	Donetsk, Ukraine	
Loss	32-4-1	(Italy) Vincenzo Cantatore	MD	12	22/06/2007	Rome, Italy	For vacant European cruiserweight title.
Win	13-1-2	(United States) Shaun George	UD	12	23/02/2007	Ekaterinburg, Russia	Won vacant WBO Asia Pacific cruiserweight title.
Loss	--	(United Kingdom) David Haye	KO	1	16/12/2005	(United Kingdom) Bracknell, Berkshire, England	Lost European cruiserweight title. Gurov knocked out at 0:45 of the first round.
Win	6-8-1	(Brazil) Marcelo Ferreira dos Santos	TKO	2	14/05/2005	Kyiv, Ukraine	
Win	10-3	(Finland) Allan "Macho Man" Gronfors	KO	1	24/02/2005	Kyiv, Ukraine	Won vacant WBA Inter-Continental cruiserweight title.
Win	--	(Ukraine) Volodymyr Savkov	KO	2	13/02/2005	Kyiv, Ukraine	Won vacant Ukraine cruiserweight title.
Win	28-2-2	(Italy) Vincenzo Rossitto	TKO	2	27/11/2004	Genoa, Italy	Won vacant European cruiserweight title. Referee stopped the bout at 1:45 of the second round.
Win	9-8-1	(Ukraine) Konstiantyn Pryziuk	TKO	4	24/10/2004	Chernihiv, Ukraine	
Win	--	(Ukraine) Ivan Dubin	KO	6	29/05/2003	Mariupol, Ukraine	
Loss	28-2	(France) Jean-Marc Mormeck	TKO	8	1 Mar 2003	(United States) Las Vegas, Nevada, U.S.	For WBA cruiserweight title
Win	5-10-1	(South Africa) Patrick Madzinga	TKO	1	23/03/2002	Kyiv, Ukraine	
Win	32-1	(Germany) Ruediger May	TKO	4	01/12/2001	Dortmund, Germany	Retained European cruiserweight title.
Win	22-2	(Germany) Torsten May	TKO	8	21/04/2001	Erfurt, Germany	European/IBF Intercontinental/WBA Inter-Continental cruiserweight titles.
Win	19-13-1	(Ukraine) Yuriy Yelistratov	KO	7	27/01/2001	Mykolaiv, Ukraine	Ukraine cruiserweight title'.
Win	19-14	(United States) Larry Prather	TKO	5	17/06/2000	Mariupol, Ukraine	WBA Inter-Continental cruiserweight title.
Win	17-21-2	(Ukraine) Kostiantyn Okhrey	TKO	6	21/01/2000	Kyiv, Ukraine	Won Ukraine cruiserweight title.
Win	6-2	(Senegal) Badara "Black Thunder" M'baye	TKO	8	26/11/1999	Marseille, France	
Win	--	(Ukraine) Mykola Bairak	KO	3	23/06/1999	Zhytomyr, Ukraine	
Win	9-5-2	(South Africa) Isaac Mahlangu	KO	4	21/05/1999	Kyiv, Ukraine	Won WBA Inter-Continental cruiserweight title.
Win	0-1	(Ukraine) Oleh Mishchenko	KO	2	23/02/1999	Kirovohrad, Ukraine	
Win	0-1-1	(Russia) Vadim Anikeev	KO	2	30/01/1999	Dniprodzerzhynsk, Ukraine	Won vacant WBC CISBB cruiserweight title.
Win	--	(Ukraine) Viktor Sidorenko	KO	2	26/06/1998	Dnipropetrovsk, Ukraine	
Loss	16-0	(United Kingdom) Terry Dunstan	KO	1	14/02/1998	(United Kingdom) London, England	For European cruiserweight title.
Win	6-4-2	(United Kingdom) Trevor Small	KO	6	25/10/1997	(United Kingdom) Queensferry, Wales	
Win	0-1	(Ukraine) Parshin	KO	2	03/05/1997	Mariupol, Ukraine	
Loss	29-4	(United States) Nate Miller	TKO	2	22/02/1997	(United States) Fort Lauderdale, Florida, U.S.	For WBA cruiserweight title
Win	14-23	(United States) Willie Lee Kemp	PTS	6	10/08/1996	St. Pauli, Germany	
Win	12-1	(Argentina) Pedro Daniel Franco	TKO	3	20/04/1996	Levallois-Perret, France	
Win	15-0	(France) Patrice Aouissi	KO	5	24/10/1995	Levallois-Perret, France	Won European cruiserweight title.
Win	5-11-1	(United States) Krishna Wainwright	TKO	3	27/06/1995	Levallois-Perret, France	
Loss	13-0	(France) Patrice Aouissi	KO	3	14/03/1995	Levallois-Perret, France	Lost European cruiserweight title.
Win	22-4-1	(France) Norbert Ekassi	TKO	1	17/01/1995	Levallois-Perret, France	Won vacant European cruiserweight title. Referee stopped the bout at 1:18 of the first round.
Win	--	(Ukraine) Serhiy Dotsenko	KO	5	09/12/1994	Mariupol, Ukraine	
Win	--	(Ukraine) Oleksiy Hovorov	PTS	8	09/10/1994	Artemivsk, Ukraine	
Win	0-2	(Bulgaria) Tzvetan Tzvetkov	KO	3	10/09/1994	Torez, Ukraine	
Win	--	(Ukraine) Ivan Honcharov	KO	6	28/08/1994	Rubizhne, Ukraine	Ukraine Cruiserweight Title.
Win	6-2-1	(France) Eugene Taima	KO	1	07/05/1994	Dnipropetrovsk, Ukraine	
Win	11-20-2	(United States) Sylvester White	PTS	8	26/02/1994	Vilvoorde, Belgium	
Win	7-3-1	(Russia) Andrey Rudenko	KO	2	30/01/1994	Makiyivka, Ukraine	
Win	1-2	(Russia) Valery Denisenko	PTS	8	25/12/1993	Mykolaiv, Ukraine	
Draw	17-4-2	(Ukraine) Valeriy Vykhor	PTS	8	24/10/1993	Sevastopol, Ukraine	
Win	--	(Ukraine) Volodymyr Vovk	KO	5	03/10/1993	Oleksandriya, Ukraine	
Win	--	(Russia) Vitaly Yarovoy	KO	8	18/07/1993	Kryvyi Rih, Ukraine	
Win	--	(Ukraine) Mykola Dobretskyi	KO	3	08/05/1993	Yalta, Ukraine	
Win	--	(Ukraine) Ihor Haluza	PTS	8	17/04/1993	Kryvyi Rih, Ukraine	
Win	--	(Ukraine) Serhiy Kryvonis	KO	4	27/03/1993	Mariupol, Ukraine	
