= Ramón Garbey =

Cuban boxer

Personal information
- Born: March 31, 1971 (age 55)

Sport
- Sport: Boxing
Medal record
Representing Cuba
World Amateur Championships
Bronze medal – third place	1991 Sydney	Middleweight
Gold medal – first place	1993 Tampere	Light Heavyweight
Pan American Games
Gold medal – first place	1991 Havana	Middleweight

Ramón Garbey (born March 31, 1971) is a heavyweight boxer from Cuba, who won the world title as an amateur in light heavyweight division (– 81 kg) at the 1993 World Amateur Boxing Championships in Tampere, Finland. In the final he defeated Nigeria's Jacklord Jacobs. Prior to that Garbey captured the gold medal at the 1991 Pan American Games in the middleweight division (– 75 kg).

== Amateur Highlights ==
- 1989 Won the World Junior Amateur Championships in San Juan, Puerto Rico at Middleweight
- 1991 1st place at Middleweight at Pan-American Games in Havana Cuba. Results were:
  - Defeated Lincoln Carter (Jamaica) TKO 1
  - Defeated Ricardo Santiago (Puerto Rico) TKO 1
  - Defeated Chris Johnson (Canada) TKO 2
- 1991 3rd place at Middleweight at World Championships in Sydney, Australia. Results were:
  - Defeated Chris Byrd (United States) points
  - Defeated Dennis Galvin (Ireland) TKO 3
  - Defeated Justin Crawford (Australia) TKO 3
  - Lost to Alexander Lebziak (Soviet Union) points
- 1992 defeated Sven Ottke by TKO 3, in AIBA tournament held in Berlin, Germany
- 1993 Light Heavyweight World Champion at competition in Tampere, Finland. Results were:
  - Defeated Mkhitar Vanessian (Armenia) TKO 1
  - Defeated Dimitri Vybornov (Russia) points
  - Defeated Wojciech Bartnik (Poland) points
  - Defeated Dale Brown (Canada) points, later scored a 4th-round TKO over Brown in 1994 in Dublin, Ireland.
  - Defeated Jacklord Jacobs (Nigeria) points

== Pro career ==
Nicknamed "El Nino" he made his professional debut on September 20, 1996, in Miami, Florida.

== Professional boxing record ==
19 Wins (13 knockouts, 6 decisions), 4 Losses (0 knockouts, 4 decisions)
Result	Record	Opponent	Type	Round	Date	Location	Notes
Win	11-8-1	(United States) Mike Sheppard	UD	4	20 Feb 2009	Fort Lauderdale, Florida, United States	40-33, 40-33, 40-33.
Win	13-36-3	(United States) James "Baby Tyson" Brock	UD	6	28 Oct 2006	Palm Beach, Florida, United States	60-54, 60-54, 60-54.
Loss	9-4-1	(United States) Kendrick "The Apostle" Releford	UD	10	8 Jun 2004	Hollywood, Florida, United States	97-93, 98-92, 98-92.
Win	16-3	(United States) Jermell "The Truth" Barnes	UD	12	17 Jan 2004	Coconut Creek, Florida, United States	WBO NABO/WBC Continental Americas Cruiserweight Titles. 116-112, 116-112, 115-113. Titles were vacated because Garbey did not make weight.
Win	35-10	(Mexico) Saul "La Cobra" Montana	TKO	8	3 Nov 2001	Miami, Florida, United States	IBA Continental Super Cruiserweight Title.
Win	22-3	(United States) Ezra Sellers	TKO	1	17 May 2001	Biloxi, Mississippi, United States	WBO NABO Cruiserweight Title. Referee stopped the bout at 1:45 of the first round.
Loss	17-0	(United States) Fres "The Big O" Oquendo	UD	10	25 Jun 2000	Elgin, Illinois, United States	90-99, 92-96, 91-97.
Loss	57-4-2	(United States) James "Lights Out" Toney	UD	10	8 Oct 1999	Taunton, Massachusetts, United States	91-99, 92-98, 93-98.
Loss	18-3	(Ghana) Napoleon Tagoe	MD	10	4 Jul 1999	Fort Lauderdale, Florida, United States	94-96, 94-96, 95-95.
Win	23-6-2	(United States) John "Yahya" McClain	UD	10	18 Apr 1999	Miami, Florida, United States	98-92, 98-92, 97-93.
Win	21-2	(United States) Leeonzer Barber	TKO	9	9 Jan 1999	Las Vegas, Nevada, United States	Referee stopped the bout at 1:18 of the ninth round.
Win	10-16	(United States) Cliff Nellon	TKO	2	13 Nov 1998	Miami, Florida, United States	
Win	14-3	(Ivory Coast) Onebo Maxime	TKO	7	21 Jul 1998	Atlantic City, New Jersey, United States	
Win	12-11	(United States) Art Bayliss	PTS	4	30 May 1998	Atlantic City, New Jersey, United States	
Win	6-22	(United States) Willie "Punching Preacher" Driver	KO	1	23 Jan 1998	Lake Worth, Florida, United States	Driver knocked out at the end of the first round.
Win	2-1	(United States) Scottie Chestnut	KO	1	4 Nov 1997	Tunica, Mississippi, United States	Chestnutt knocked out at 1:45 of the first round.
Win	5-9-3	(United States) Roy "House of" Payne	KO	1	3 Oct 1997	Atlantic City, New Jersey, United States	
Win	0-1	(United States) Travis Evans	KO	1	20 Jun 1997	Atlantic City, New Jersey, United States	
Win	4-8	(United States) Anthony Wade	TKO	1	26 Apr 1997	Atlantic City, New Jersey, United States	
Win	0-1	(United States) Sedreck "Big Buck" Fields	UD	4	5 Apr 1997	Atlantic City, New Jersey, United States	40-35, 39-36, 39-37.
Win	0-9	(United States) Anthony Harris	TKO	1	6 Dec 1996	Atlantic City, New Jersey, United States	Referee stopped the bout at 2:51 of the first round.
Win	0-20-2	(United States) Tony Torres	TKO	1	1 Nov 1996	Coconut Creek, Florida, United States	
Win	1-5	(United States) Kerry Parks	TKO	2	20 Sep 1996	Miami, Florida, United States	Referee stopped the bout at 1:03 of the second round.
