= Rostyslav Zaulychnyi =

Ukrainian boxer (born 1968)

Medal record

Men's Boxing

Representing the Soviet Union

European Amateur Championships
Bronze medal – third place	1991 Gothenburg	Light Heavyweight

Representing the Unified Team

Olympic Games
Silver medal – second place	1992 Barcelona	Light Heavyweight

Representing Ukraine

World Amateur Championships
Bronze medal – third place	1993 Tampere	Light Heavyweight

European Amateur Championships
Bronze medal – third place	1993 Bursa	Light Heavyweight

Rostyslav Zaulychnyi (Ukrainian: Ростислав Зауличний; born September 6, 1968, in Lviv) is a retired Ukrainian amateur boxer, who represented the Unified Team (former Soviet Union) and won the Light Heavyweight Silver medal at the 1992 Summer Olympics.

== Olympic results ==
- 1st round bye
- Defeated Jacklord Jacobs (Nigeria) 16-8
- Defeated Stephen Wilson (Great Britain) 13-0
- Defeated Zoltán Béres (Hungary) RSC 3 (2:51)
- Lost to Torsten May (Germany) 3-8
