= Mehmet Gürgen =

Turkish boxer

Personal information
- Nationality: Turkish
- Born: 30 December 1968 (age 56)

Sport
- Sport: Boxing

Mehmet Gürgen (born 30 December 1968) is a Turkish boxer. He competed in the men's light heavyweight event at the 1992 Summer Olympics. In his first match at the Olympics, he was drawn against Angel Espinosa but was beaten in the third round.

At the 1991 World Amateur Boxing Championships in Sydney, he made it as far as the semi-finals before defeat to Torsten May in the light heavyweight category.
