= Zoltán Béres =

Hungarian boxer

Olympic medal record

Men's boxing
Bronze medal – third place	1992 Barcelona	Light heavyweight

Zoltán Béres (born January 19, 1968, in Nyírbátor) is a boxer from Hungary, who won a light heavyweight bronze medal at the 1992 Summer Olympics.

== Amateur career ==
As an amateur, Beres was a member of the Hungarian Olympic team of 1992 Barcelona in light heavyweight and won the light heavyweight bronze medal.

== Amateur highlights ==
- 1992 Olympic results: boxed as a light heavyweight (81 kg)
  - Round of 32 - Defeated Paolo Mwaselle of Tanzania, 30:13
  - Round of 16 - Defeated Asghar Ali Changezi of Pakistan, RSCH-1
  - Quarterfinals - Defeated Roland Raforme of Seychelles, 11:3
  - Semifinals - Lost to Rostislav Zaulichniy of Unified Team URS, RSC-3

== Professional career ==
Beres began his professional career in 1998 and has had limited success. Having fought mainly in Europe, he has lost to the likes of Tomasz Adamek, Silvio Branco, and Sebastian Kober.

== Professional boxing record ==
44 wins (17 knockouts, 27 decisions), 52 losses (27 knockouts, 25 decisions), 3 draws
Result	Record	Opponent	Type	Round	Date	Location	Notes
Loss	4-0	(Germany) Mohamed Al Zein	KO	1	11/10/2015	Herne, Germany	Referee stopped the bout at 1:16 of the first round.
Loss	--	(Germany) Dennis Lewandowski	PTS	4	08/11/2014	Koblenz, Germany	
Loss	23-1	(Slovakia) Tamas Kovacs	TKO	2	26/04/2014	Žilina, Slovakia	Referee stopped the bout at 2:52 of the second round.
Loss	35-13	(Hungary) Laszlo Hubert	PTS	8	27/01/2013	Budapest, Hungary	
Loss	32-15	(Hungary) Gabor Halasz	TKO	7	23/03/2013	Szekszárd, Hungary	UBO international cruiserweight title.
Loss	3-0	(Croatia) Agron Smakici	TKO	1	27/01/2013	Vienna, Austria	Referee stopped the bout at 2:58 of the first round.
Win	20-13	(Romania) Istvan Varga	UD	4	01/03/2012	Budapest, Hungary	
Loss	29-15	(Hungary) Gabor Halasz	UD	4	01/03/2012	Budapest, Hungary	
Win	24-9-2	(Bosnia and Herzegovina) Adnan Buharalija	RTD	3	20/11/2011	Capljina, Bosnia and Herzegovina	Adnan retired at 3:00 of the third round.
Win	0-1	(Hungary) Imre Kosa	TKO	3	09/07/2011	Győr, Hungary	
Loss	31-5-1	(Czech Republic) Roman Kracik	TKO	2	30/12/2010	Prague, Czech Republic	Referee stopped the bout at 1:44 of the second round.
Win	0-8	(Hungary) Gabor Kovacs	TKO	3	12/10/2010	Nové Zámky, Slovakia	
Loss	25-6	(Hungary) Laszlo Hubert	DQ	6	02/05/2010	Tirana, Albania	WBF international heavyweight title
Win	2-32	(Hungary) Miklos Toldi	TKO	1	27/10/2009	Sturovo, Slovakia	
Loss	15-2-1	(Azerbaijan) Ali Ismailov	TKO	2	25/09/2009	Saint Petersburg, Russia	Referee stopped the bout at 2:53 of the second round.
Draw	12-21-2	(Hungary) Viktor Szalai	PTS	4	19/08/2009	Sturovo, Slovakia	
Win	6-9	(Hungary) Zoltan Peto	PTS	6	12/05/2009	Nové Zámky, Slovakia	
Loss	18-1	(Belgium) Geoffrey Battelo	TKO	5	04/04/2009	Düsseldorf, Germany	Referee stopped the bout at 2:04 of the fifth round.
Loss	12-0-1	(Poland) Tomasz Hutkowski	TKO	3	13/12/2008	Ketrzyn, Poland	
Win	8-34-2	(Hungary) Janos Somogyi	PTS	4	25/06/2008	Sturovo, Slovakia	
Loss	6-0-1	(Poland) Gregory Soszynski	TKO	4	01/06/2008	Józefów, Poland	Referee stopped the bout at 2:42 of the fourth round.
Win	8-31-1	(Hungary) Janos Somogyi	PTS	4	01/05/2008	Sturovo, Slovakia	
Loss	15-1	(Denmark) Lasse Johansen	TKO	4	23/03/2008	Esbjerg, Denmark	Referee stopped the bout at 1:22 of the fourth round.
Win	2-26	(Hungary) Miklos Toldi	TKO	2	25/01/2008	Budapest, Hungary	
Loss	17-25-3	(Algeria) Ramdane Serdjane	DQ	6	25/12/2007	Izegem, Belgium	
Win	2-19	(Hungary) Miklos Toldi	TKO	2	14/04/2007	Košice, Slovakia	Referee stopped the bout at 1:00 of the second round.
Win	0-14	(Hungary) Szabolcs Gergely	TKO	2	26/03/2007	Budapest, Hungary	Referee stopped the bout at 1:51 of the second round.
Loss	6-0	(Germany) Sebastian Koeber	KO	2	16/02/2007	Cologne, Germany	Beres knocked out at 1:07 of the second round.
Win	0-12	(Hungary) Szabolcs Gergely	PTS	6	13/01/2007	Nové Zámky, Slovakia	
Loss	12-0	(Poland) Mariusz Wach	TKO	4	16/12/2006	Poznań, Poland	TWBA Heavyweight Title. Referee stopped the bout at 1:58 of the fourth round.
Loss	6-0	(Belgium) Geoffrey Battelo	UD	6	18/11/2006	Namur, Belgium	
Loss	11-8	(Latvia) Edgars Kalnars	UD	8	28/10/2006	Fuerstenwalde, Germany	
Win	0-9-1	(Hungary) Csaba Bajczik	PTS	4	12/10/2006	Budapest, Hungary	
Loss	12-2-2	(Montenegro) Goran Gogic	KO	2	09/09/2006	Hamburg, Germany	Beres knocked out at 0:36 of the fourth round.
Loss	4-0	(Russia) Aleksandr Alekseyev	TKO	4	25/07/2006	Hamburg, Germany	Referee stopped the bout at 2:29 of the fourth round.
Win	0-3-1	(Hungary) Csaba Bajczik	PTS	6	09/06/2006	Nové Zámky, Slovakia	
Loss	10-2-1	(Cameroon) Jean Claude Bikoi	TKO	6	05/05/2006	Dudelange, Luxembourg	
Loss	13-1	(France) Jean Marc Monrose	DQ	4	15/04/2006	Uzès, France	
Win	3-70-3	(Hungary) Csaba Olah	PTS	4	17/03/2006	Tokol, Hungary	
Loss	34-2	(Italy) Pietro Aurino	PTS	6	10/03/2006	Bergamo, Italy	
Win	0-13	(Slovakia) Stefan Kusnier	PTS	4	07/02/2006	Nové Zámky, Slovakia	
Win	2-8	(Hungary) Miklos Toldi	PTS	4	23/01/2006	Budapest, Hungary	
Loss	18-0	(Italy) Giacobbe Fragomeni	TKO	4	16/12/2005	Milan, Italy	
Win	0-4	(Hungary) Zsolt Nemet	PTS	4	30/11/2005	Sturovo, Slovakia	
Loss	11-0	(Germany) Mark Hendem	UD	6	26/11/2005	Leverkusen, Germany	
Win	0-7	(Hungary) Gabor Czinke	PTS	4	24/10/2005	Sturovo, Slovakia	
Loss	16-0-1	(Denmark) Johny Jensen	TKO	5	30/09/2005	Slagelse, Denmark	Referee stopped the bout at 1:20 of the fifth round.
Win	0-2	(Hungary) Zsolt Nemet	TKO	3	03/09/2005	Budapest, Hungary	
Win	1-24	(Slovakia) Sylvester Petrovic	TKO	2	19/08/2005	Sturovo, Slovakia	Referee stopped the bout at 2:35 of the second round.
Win	0-3	(Hungary) Miklos Toldi	PTS	4	12/08/2005	Sturovo, Slovakia	
Win	0-4	(Hungary) Gabor Czinke	PTS	4	07/08/2005	Sturovo, Slovakia	
Win	0-3	(Hungary) Norbert Turanyi	PTS	4	01/08/2005	Sturovo, Slovakia	
Win	1-23	(Slovakia) Sylvester Petrovic	PTS	6	24/07/2005	Nové Zámky, Slovakia	
Win	--	(Hungary) Miklos Toldi	PTS	4	17/07/2005	Nové Zámky, Slovakia	
Win	--	(Hungary) Gabor Czinke	PTS	4	10/07/2005	Budapest, Hungary	
Draw	22-34-6	(Hungary) Laszlo Paszterko	PTS	4	13/06/2005	Sturovo, Slovakia	
Loss	51-8-2	(Italy) Silvio Branco	TKO	4	20/05/2005	Roma, Italy	Referee stopped the bout at 2:03 of the fourth round.
Win	0-9	(Slovakia) Vlado Szabo	PTS	4	27/04/2005	Košice, Slovakia	
Loss	31-3-1	(Algeria) Mohamed Benguesmia	TKO	3	09/03/2005	Algiers, Algeria	WBB World Cruiserweight Title.
Win	0-6	(Slovakia) Vlado Szabo	PTS	4	04/01/2005	Sturovo, Slovakia	
Win	3-64-3	(Hungary) Csaba Olah	UD	4	28/12/2004	Nyíregyháza, Hungary	
Win	0-3	(Slovakia) Stefan Kusnier	KO	1	11/12/2004	Salzburg, Austria	Kusnier knocked out at 2:25 of the first round.
Loss	18-7-1	(Italy) Paolo Ferrara	PTS	6	12/11/2004	Collegno, Italy	
Loss	12-4-1	(Italy) Alessandro Guni	PTS	6	16/10/2004	Verbania, Italy	
Loss	8-0	(Denmark) Lasse Johansen	TKO	3	17/04/2004	Mariehamn, Finland	
Loss	5-1	(Italy) Remo Tatangelo	PTS	6	26/12/2003	Grosseto, Italy	
Loss	46-6-2	(Italy) Silvio Branco	TKO	5	31/05/2003	Civitavecchia, Italy	
Loss	23-3-1	(France) Kamel Amrane	UD	8	19/05/2003	Levallois-Perret, France	
Loss	22-0	(Poland) Tomasz Adamek	UD	6	06/04/2003	Benidorm, Spain	
Loss	7-0	(Finland) Allan Gronfors	UD	6	25/02/2003	Helsinki, Finland	
Loss	20-11-1	(Czech Republic) Milan Konecny	TKO	3	17/05/2002	Prague, Czech Republic	Czech/Czech International Cruiserweight Titles.
Loss	26-2	(Liberia) Lee Manuel Ossie	KO	8	13/04/2002	Berlin, Germany	WBB World Cruiserweight Title.
Win	0-6	(Slovakia) Lubomir Janota	TKO	4	23/02/2002	Nové Zámky, Slovakia	
Loss	6-0	(France) Jackson Chanet	TKO	4	22/12/2001	Orléans, France	
Loss	25-2	(Italy) Vincenzo Cantatore	TKO	3	17/11/2001	Civitavecchia, Italy	
Loss	19-10-1	(Czech Republic) Milan Konecny	PTS	8	13/10/2001	Budapest, Hungary	
Loss	15-0	(Croatia) Stipe Drews	PTS	6	23/09/2001	Eddersheim, Hessen, Germany	
Win	0-15	(Slovakia) Marek Svoren	TKO	3	19/08/2001	Sturovo, Slovakia	
Loss	20-3	(Italy) Mario Tonus	PTS	10	20/07/2001	San Dona di Piave, Italy	
Loss	13-1	(France) Frederic Serrat	PTS	6	03/07/2001	Pont-Sainte-Maxence, France	
Win	15-2-1	(Turkey) Ahmet Oener	PTS	6	05/05/2001	Braunschweig, Germany	
Win	0-2	(Croatia) Velimir Listes	TKO	2	17/03/2001	Budapest, Hungary	
Loss	10-0	(France) Julien Chamayou	PTS	6	06/03/2001	Clermont-Ferrand, France	
Loss	8-1	(France) Yohan Gimenez	PTS	6	13/02/2001	Pont-Audemer, France	
Loss	15-6-3	(Cameroon) Simon Bakinde	PTS	6	19/12/2000	Pont-Sainte-Maxence, France	
Win	--	(Slovakia) Stefan Cirok	PTS	4	23/06/2000	Budapest, Hungary	
Draw	5-1	(Italy) Alessandro Guni	PTS	6	03/06/2000	Vienna, Austria	
Loss	8-0	(Germany) Firat Arslan	PTS	8	21/08/1999	Dresden, Germany	
Loss	6-1	(Denmark) Jesper Kristiansen	TKO	5	13/08/1999	Skagen, Denmark	
Win	21-40-3	(Belgium) Yves Monsieur	PTS	6	19/06/1999	Vienna, Austria	
Win	--	(Ukraine) Oleg Vdovenko	KO	1	07/05/1999	Vienna, Austria	
Win	2-12	(Hungary) Ferenc Deak	PTS	10	18/04/1999	Tokol, Hungary	
Loss	33-4-2	(Belgium) Dirk Wallyn	TKO	7	05/12/1998	Ingelmunster, Belgium	
Loss	6-1	(France) Jerry Benech	PTS	6	22/09/1998	Pont-Audemer, France	
Win	0-6	(Slovakia) Sylvester Petrovic	PTS	6	30/08/1998	Budapest, Hungary	
Win	--	(Slovakia) Peter Simko	TKO	3	15/05/1998	Szekszárd, Hungary	
Win	4-0	(Germany) Mohammed Lassoued	KO	2	28/02/1998	Zofingen, Switzerland	
Win	0-1	Richard Less	KO	1	21/02/1998	Budapest, Hungary	
Win	0-2	(Hungary) Laszlo Virag	PTS	4	17/01/1998	Budapest, Hungary	
