= Manuel Verde =

Mexican boxer (born 1966)

Personal information
- Born: 11 November 1966 (age 58); Mazatlán, Sinaloa, Mexico

Sport
- Sport: Boxing

Manuel Verde (born 11 November 1966) is a Mexican boxer. He competed in the men's light heavyweight event at the 1992 Summer Olympics.

His son, Marco, is also a boxer.
