= Shane Swartz =

American boxer

Shane Swartz (born December 27, 1975, in Fort Collins, Colorado) is an American former professional boxer who competed from 1996 to 2007.

== Amateur career ==
Swartz began boxing under the guidance of his father Roger at the age of four. He was an outstanding amateur, having won back-to-back gold medals at the 1993 and 1994 U.S. Olympic Festival. He was upset by Dana Rucker in the semifinals of the 1995 edition. Swartz was also the U.S. National Amateur Champion at 165 pounds in 1994 and 1995.

== Professional career ==
Known as "Hurricane", Swartz began his professional career in 1996 and has had limited success. He moved up to the heavyweight division and has fought several notable foes, such as Calvin Brock and Malik Scott, but has generally come up short in his big fights.

== Professional boxing record ==
18 Wins (12 knockouts, 6 decisions), 6 Losses (5 knockouts, 1 decision)
Result	Record	Opponent	Type	Round	Date	Location	Notes
Loss	11-0	Alexander Frenkel	KO	1	18/08/2007	Prenzlauer Berg, Berlin, Germany	Swartz knocked out at 0:50 of the first round.
Loss	22-0-1	Vadim Tokarev	KO	2	25/11/2006	Warsaw, Poland	NABF Cruiserweight Title. Swartz knocked out at 0:40 of the second round.
Win	35-4-1	Dale Brown	TD	5	30/06/2006	Hollywood, Florida, U.S.	Referee stopped the bout after the fifth round due to a severe cut caused by an accidental headbutt.
Win	20-10	Benito Fernandez	RTD	3	03/02/2006	Sarasota, Florida, U.S.	
Loss	22-0	Grigory Drozd	TKO	7	25/10/2005	Vienna, Austria	
Loss	21-0	Malik Scott	UD	8	23/04/2005	Las Vegas, Nevada, U.S.	
Loss	16-0	Calvin Brock	RTD	6	29/08/2003	Reading, Pennsylvania, U.S.	
Win	18-13-1	George Stephens	UD	6	18/05/2003	Black Hawk, Colorado, U.S.	
Loss	20-48-3	David Robinson	TKO	2	12/10/2001	Colorado Springs, Colorado, U.S.	
Win	25-8-3	Ed Dalton	TKO	4	04/08/2001	Tacoma, Washington, U.S.	Referee stopped the bout at 1:05 of the fourth round.
Win	2-24-2	Richie Galvan	TKO	1	13/07/2001	Colorado Springs, Colorado, U.S.	
Win	4-5	Joe Escamilla	TKO	4	12/11/2000	Denver, Colorado, U.S.	
Win	2-3	Rich Maciel	KO	2	06/10/2000	Loveland, Colorado, U.S.	
Win	5-19	Martin Lopez	TKO	2	15/09/2000	Denver, Colorado, U.S.	Referee stopped the bout at 1:56 of the second round.
Win	4-3	Joe Escamilla	TKO	3	27/08/2000	Black Hawk, Colorado, U.S.	
Win	3-2-1	Steve Robinson	TD	3	26/02/1997	Denver, Colorado, U.S.	
Win	7-14-2	Tyrone Jackson	PTS	6	21/01/1997	Biloxi, Mississippi, U.S.	
Win	5-6	Angelo Simpson	UD	6	16/12/1996	Fort Collins, Colorado, U.S.	
Win	6-3-1	Franklin Edmondson	UD	6	12/08/1996	Saratoga Springs, New York, U.S.	
Win	0-2	Cecil Hagins	KO	2	13/07/1996	Denver, Colorado, U.S.	
Win	7-2	Ed Bryant	TKO	1	12/06/1996	Atlantic City, New Jersey, U.S.	Referee stopped the bout at 2:20 of the first round.
Win	0-9	Jim Tanner	KO	1	03/06/1996	Fort Collins, Colorado, U.S.	
Win	6-20-1	Vince Foster	KO	2	18/05/1996	South Dakota, U.S.	
Win	0-1	Maurice Morris	TKO	1	10/05/1996	Boston, Massachusetts, U.S.	
