= Roberto Castelli (boxer) =

Italian boxer

Personal information
- Nationality: Italian
- Born: 3 March 1969 (age 56); Treviglio, Italy

Sport
- Sport: Boxing

Roberto Castelli (born 3 March 1969) is an Italian boxer. He competed in the men's light heavyweight event at the 1992 Summer Olympics.
