= Paulo Mwaselle =

Tanzanian boxer (born 1969)

Personal information
- Nationality: Tanzanian
- Born: 27 March 1969 (age 56)

Sport
- Sport: Boxing

Paulo Mwaselle (born 27 March 1969) is a Tanzanian boxer. He competed in the men's light heavyweight event at the 1992 Summer Olympics.
