= Andrey Kurnyavka =

Kyrgyzstani boxer

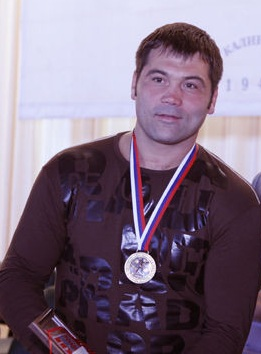

Personal information
- Born: 4 May 1968 (age 58) Frunze, Kirghiz SSR, Soviet Union
- Weight: 75–91 kg (165–201 lb)

Sport
- Sport: Boxing
- Club: Trudovye Rezervy
- Coached by: Mikhail Gashloma
Medal record
Representing the Soviet Union
World Championships
| Gold medal – first place | 1989 Moscow | -75 kg |
| Silver medal – second place | 1991 Sydney | -81 kg |
European Championships
| Bronze medal – third place | 1989 Athens | -75 kg |

Andrey Petrovich Kurnyavka (Russian: Андрей Петрович Курнявка, born 4 May 1968) is a retired Soviet and Kyrgyzstani boxer. He won the world middleweight title in 1989, and finished second in 1991, but was not included to the 1992 Soviet Olympic team and retired from boxing. He came out of retirement after a last-minute offer to compete for Kyrgyzstan in the heavyweight event of the 1996 Summer Olympics, but lost in the first bout to the eventual winner Félix Savón.

== Biography ==
Following his elder brother Kurnyavka trained in swimming for seven years, and took up boxing only in 1983. Next year he won Kyrgyz junior championships, in 1985 was included to the Soviet junior team, and in 1987 moved to the senior team. His breakthrough came in 1989, when he placed third at the European championships and won the Soviet and world titles, beating in the final the reigning world champion Angel Espinosa. After placing second at the 1991 World Championships he spent a year competing for German boxing clubs. Shortly before the 1992 Olympic selection he injured his hand and was left out of the Unified Team (the successor of the Soviet team at the 1992 Olympics).

Upon winning the silver at the 1991 Championships, he was approached on the spot by the undisputed heavyweight champion of the world Evander Holyfield and his handler Lou Duva, who noted Kurnyavka's aggressive style and offered him a full-time job as a sparring partner in the Team Holyfield camp, $10,000 monthly salary plus covering all other expenses. Holyfield's team was then in negotiations with Tyson's team on arranging the superfight, and Kurnyavka might have been quite useful for it. However, he didn't turn pro.

Disappointed about his '1992 dropout from the Unified Team going for the Barcelona Olympics, he retired from boxing and went into business. In 1996 he unexpectedly received an offer to compete for Kyrgyzstan at the forthcoming Olympics. By that time he gained much weight and went out of shape. He was also unlucky to meet the triple Olympic champion Félix Savón in the first bout. Savón was overly cautious in the first round, but went on to win the last two. Kurnyavka was the only boxer, who gave Savón a relatively even fight, all the opponents whom Savón met in the later rounds of the Olympics, he defeated with much ease than Kurnyavka.

In the 1990s Kurnyavka was shot on two occasions and spent four years in jail, in relation to his business activities. In 2002 he moved from his native Bishkek to Moscow, where he works as a boxing coach and serves as vice president of the Moscow Boxing Federation. Kurnyavka is married to Nina and has a son and a daughter with her. He also has two daughters from his previous marriage, who live with their German mother.
