= 1993 World Amateur Boxing Championships =

Boxing competitions

1993 AIBA World Boxing Championships
- Venue: Tampere Ice Stadium
- Location: Tampere, Finland
- Start date: May 7, 1993
- End date: May 16, 1993

The Men's 1993 World Amateur Boxing Championships were held in Tampere, Finland from May 7 to 16. The seventh edition of this competition, held nearly a year after the Summer Olympics in Barcelona, Spain, was organised by the Tampere Boxing Association, member of the Finnish Boxing Association under the influence of the world's governing body for amateur boxing AIBA. The 1993 World Championships witnessed the introduction of publicised scores at the end of each round.

== Medal table ==
Rank	Nation	Gold	Silver	Bronze	Total
1	Cuba (CUB)	8	3	0	11
2	Bulgaria (BUL)	2	2	0	4
3	Romania (ROU)	1	0	2	3
4	Armenia (ARM)	1	0	1	2
5	United States (USA)	0	1	2	3
6	Georgia (GEO)	0	1	1	2
6	Turkey (TUR)	0	1	1	2
8	Finland (FIN)	0	1	0	1
8	Lithuania (LTU)	0	1	0	1
8	Nigeria (NGR)	0	1	0	1
8	Uzbekistan (UZB)	0	1	0	1
12	Russia (RUS)	0	0	4	4
13	Germany (GER)	0	0	2	2
13	Ukraine (UKR)	0	0	2	2
15	Canada (CAN)	0	0	1	1
15	Egypt (EGY)	0	0	1	1
15	France (FRA)	0	0	1	1
15	Ireland (IRL)	0	0	1	1
15	Kazakhstan (KAZ)	0	0	1	1
15	Mongolia (MGL)	0	0	1	1
15	Netherlands (NED)	0	0	1	1
15	Norway (NOR)	0	0	1	1
15	Slovakia (SVK)	0	0	1	1
Totals (23 entries)		12	12	24	48

== Medal winners ==
Event	Gold	Silver	Bronze
Light Flyweight (– 48 kilograms)	Nshan Munchyan; Armenia	Daniel Petrov; Bulgaria	Albert Guardado; United States Erdenotsogtyn Tsogtjargal; Mongolia
Flyweight (– 51 kilograms)	Waldemar Font; Cuba	Kikmatulla Ahmedov; Uzbekistan	Hassan Mustafa; Egypt (Republic of Ireland) Damaen Kelly; Ireland
Bantamweight (– 54 kilograms)	Aleksandar Khristov; Bulgaria	Joel Casamayor; Cuba	Vladislav Antonov; Russia İlhan Güler; Turkey
Featherweight (– 57 kilograms)	Serafim Todorov; Bulgaria	Enrique Carrión; Cuba	(Georgia (country)) Ramaz Paliani; Georgia Marcelica Tudoriu; Romania
Lightweight (– 60 kilograms)	Damián Austin; Cuba	Larry Nicholson; United States	Tibor Rafael; Slovakia Vasile Nistor; Romania
Light Welterweight (– 63,5 kilograms)	Héctor Vinent; Cuba	Jyri Kjall; Finland	Oleg Saitov; Russia Oktay Urkal; Germany
Welterweight (– 67 kilograms)	Juan Hernández Sierra; Cuba	Vitalijus Karpačiauskas; Lithuania	Serhiy Horodnichov; Ukraine Andreas Otto; Germany
Light Middleweight (– 71 kilograms)	Francisc Vaştag; Romania	Alfredo Duvergel; Cuba	Sergey Karavaev; Russia Geir Hitland; Norway
Middleweight (– 75 kilograms)	Ariel Hernández; Cuba	Akın Kuloğlu; Turkey	Raymond Joval; Netherlands Vassiliy Jirov; Kazakhstan
Light Heavyweight (– 81 kilograms)	Ramón Garbey; Cuba	Jacklord Jacobs; Nigeria	Dale Brown; Canada Rostyslav Zaulychnyi; Ukraine
Heavyweight (– 91 kilograms)	Félix Savón; Cuba	(Georgia (country)) Georgi Kandelaki; Georgia	Stéphane Allouane; France Arshak Avartakyan; Armenia
Super Heavyweight (+ 91 kilograms)	Roberto Balado; Cuba	Svilen Rusinov; Bulgaria	Yevgeny Belousov; Russia Jo-el Scott; United States
