= Wojciech Bartnik =

Polish boxer

Personal information
- Nickname: Wojownik
- Nationality: Poland
- Born: Wojciech Stanisław Bartnik; 2 December 1967 (age 58) Oleśnica, Dolnośląskie
- Height: 1.82 m (6 ft 0 in)
- Weight: Heavyweight

Boxing career
- Stance: Southpaw

Boxing record
- Total fights: 31
- Wins: 26
- Win by KO: 10
- Losses: 4
- Draws: 1
Medal record
Olympic Games
Bronze medal – third place	1992 Barcelona	Light Heavyweight
European Amateur Championships
Bronze medal – third place	1996 Vejle	Heavyweight

Wojciech Stanisław Bartnik (born 2 December 1967 in Olesnica) is a former southpaw boxer from Poland, who won a Light Heavyweight Bronze medal at the 1992 Summer Olympics.

== Amateur career ==
- 1992 – Bronze Medal (Light Heavyweight) at the Barcelona Olympic Games
  - Defeated Alex Gonzales (Puerto Rico) points
  - Defeated Mohammed Benguesmia (Algeria) points
  - Defeated Angel Espinosa (Cuba) points
  - Lost to Torsten May (Germany) points
- 1996 – Bronze Medal (Heavyweight) at European Amateur Boxing Championships in Vejle, Denmark
  - Defeated Gitas Juskevicius (Lithuania) points
  - Defeated Alexey Chudinov (Russia) retired
  - Lost to Luan Krasniqi (Germany) points
- 1996 – Represented Poland (Heavyweight) at the Atlanta Olympic Games
  - Defeated Larha Singh (India) points
  - Lost to Georgi Kandelaki (Georgia) points
- 2000 – Represented Poland (Heavyweight) at the Sydney Olympic Games
  - Lost to Michael Bennett (United States) points

== Professional career ==
Bartnik began his professional career in 2001 and had limited success. His biggest fight was a points loss to Albert Sosnowski in 2004. Wojciech Bartnik's stats: 29 fights, 24 wins (9 by KO), 4 losses, 1 draw.
