= Parshin =

Parshin (Russian: Паршин) (feminine: Parshina) is a Russian-language surname. It may refer to:

- Aleksandr Parshin, Russian footballer
- Aleksei Parshin, Russian mathematician, the namesake of the terms "Parshin chain" and "Parshin's conjecture"
- Denis Parshin, Russian ice hockey player
- Georgy Parshin, Soviet World War II pilot, twice Hero of the Soviet Union
- Nikolai Parshin, Soviet footballer
- Lana Parshina, Russian-American journalist and filmmaker
- Daria Parshina, Russian swimmer
- Valentina Parshina, Russian and Soviet agronomist and politician
