= Larry Nicholson =

American boxer

Personal information
- Nationality: American
- Weight: Lightweight

Boxing career
Medal record
Men's amateur boxing
Representing United States
World Championships
| Silver medal – second place | 1993 Tampere | Lightweight |
Goodwill Games
| Bronze medal – third place | 1994 Saint Petersburg | Lightweight |

Larry Nicholson is an American boxer.

== Life and career ==
Nicholson attended Chapel Hill High School and Northern Michigan University.

Nicholson competed at the 1993 World Amateur Boxing Championships, winning the silver medal in the lightweight event.
