= Bai Chongguang =

Chinese boxer (born 1970)

Personal information
- Full name: 白 崇光
- Nationality: China
- Born: August 15, 1970 (age 55) Harbin, Heilongjiang, China
- Height: 1.84 m (6 ft 0 in)
- Weight: 83 kg (183 lb)

Sport
- Sport: Boxing
- Weight class: Light Heavyweight
Medal record
Asian Games
Gold medal – first place	1990 Beijing	Light Heavyweight

Bai Chongguang (Chinese: 白崇光; pinyin: Bái Chóngguāng; born August 15, 1970) is a retired boxer from PR China, who competed for his native country at the 1992 Summer Olympics in Barcelona, Spain. There he was defeated in the first round of the Men's Light-Heavyweight (– 81 kg) division by South Korea's Ko Yo-Da (4:18). He won a gold medal at the 1990 Asian Games.
