= Kim Gil-nam =

North Korean boxer (born 1964)

Personal information
- Nationality: North Korean
- Born: 29 August 1964 (age 61)

Sport
- Sport: Boxing

Kim Gil-nam (born 29 August 1964) is a North Korean boxer. He competed in the men's light heavyweight event at the 1992 Summer Olympics.
