= Ko Yo-da =

South Korean boxer

Personal information
- Full name: Korean: 고요다
- Nationality: South Korean
- Born: 26 September 1969 (age 55)

Sport
- Sport: Boxing

Ko Yo-da (born 26 September 1969) is a South Korean boxer. He competed in the men's light heavyweight event at the 1992 Summer Olympics.
