= Asghar Ali Changezi =

Pakistani boxer (born 1967)

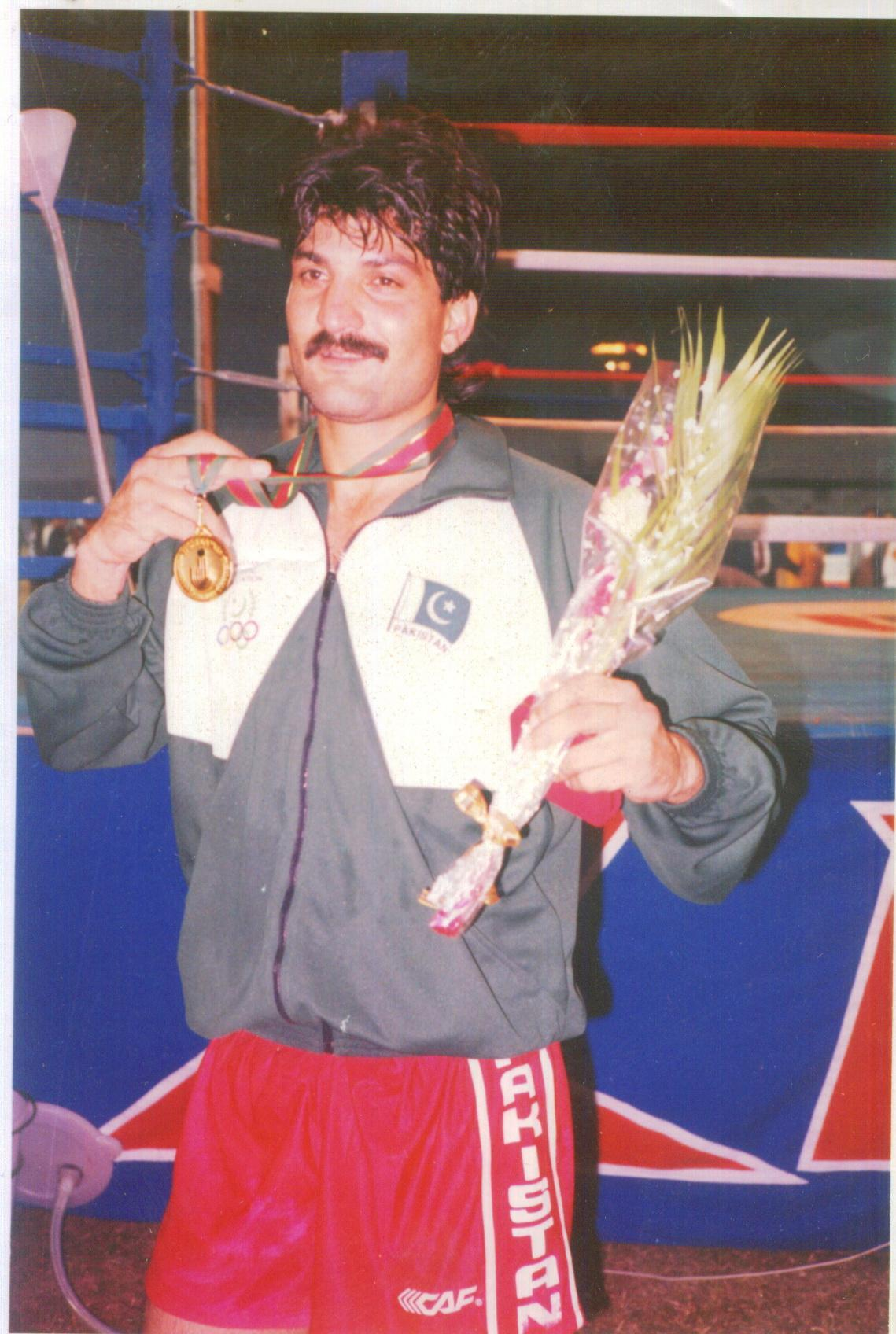

Personal information
- Nationality: Pakistani
- Born: 3 March 1967 (age 59) Mehrabad Alamdar Road, Quetta, Pakistan

Sport
- Sport: Boxing
Medal record
Asian Championships
Gold medal – first place	1992 Bangkok	81 kg

Asghar Ali Changezi (born 3 March 1967) is a Pakistani professional Olympian boxer. Changezi participation in 34 National Games and is a National and International Gold medalist (Boxing).

== Early life ==
Changezi was born on 3 March 1967, in Mehrabad, Alamdar Road, a Hazara ethnic neighborhood in the southwestern city of Quetta, Pakistan.

== Boxing Career ==
He competed in the men's light heavyweight event at the 1992 Summer Olympics.

Summary of his achievements are as per below:

 1- Asian Gold medal won 1992 in Bangkok 

 2- Participate Barcelona olympics1992 Barcelona (Spain) with ranking of world no. (8) 

 3- Four times won Gold medals in SAF games in the years 1984 (Nepal) 1989 (Islamabad) 1991 (Colombians) 1993 Dhaka (Bangladesh)and record of hat trick winner 

 4- Two times won Gold medals in k•E•S•E International competitions in 1990 (Karachi) and 1993 (Karachi) 

 5- Won Gold medal in P•S•B International Boxing tournament 1989 (Islamabad)

 6- PAK-IRAN Boxing tournament and won Gold medal (1991) (Karachi)  

 7- 28 times represented country from 1983–1996 in international competitions 

 8- Remained Captain of Pakistan Boxing team from 1993 to 1996
