= Stephen Wilson (boxer) =

British boxer

Personal information
- Nationality: British (Scottish)
- Born: 30 March 1971 (age 53); Edinburgh, Scotland

Sport
- Sport: Boxing

Stephen Wilson (born 30 March 1971) is a retired British boxer. He competed in the men's light heavyweight event at the 1992 Summer Olympics.

Wilson won the 1990 Amateur Boxing Association British middleweight title, when boxing out of the Haddington ABC.
