= Aleksandr Parshin =

Russian footballer

Personal information
- Full name: Aleksandr Gennadyevich Parshin
- Date of birth: 15 January 1986 (age 40)
- Height: 1.75 m (5 ft 9 in)
- Positions: Midfielder; forward

Senior career*
Years	Team	Apps	(Gls)
2001–2004	FC Shinnik-2 Yaroslavl		
2005–2006	FC Shinnik Yaroslavl	0	(0)
2007–2008	FC NKZ Shinnik Yaroslavl		
2009	FC Rostov Veliky Rostov		
2009	FC Sheksna Cherepovets	28	(5)
2010–2012	FC Dynamo Kostroma	72	(4)
2012	FC Dynamo Kostroma (amateur)		
2014	FC Shinnik-M Yaroslavl		
2016–2017	FC Shinnik-M Yaroslavl		
- * Club domestic league appearances and goals

Aleksandr Gennadyevich Parshin (Russian: Александр Геннадьевич Паршин; born 15 January 1986) is a former Russian professional football player.

== Club career ==
He made his debut for FC Shinnik Yaroslavl on 2 July 2006 in a Russian Cup game against FC Dynamo Bryansk.
