= Damdiny Zul =

Mongolian boxer (born 1973)

Personal information
- Nationality: Mongolian
- Born: 16 February 1973 (age 52); Mongolian People's Republic

Sport
- Sport: Boxing

Damdiny Zul (Mongolian: Дамдины Зул) born 16 February 1973) is a Mongolian boxer. He competed in the men's light heavyweight event at the 1992 Summer Olympics.
