= Dale Brown (boxer) =

Canadian boxer (born 1971)

Personal information
- Full name: Robert Dale Brown
- Born: December 15, 1971 (age 54) Calgary, Alberta, Canada

Sport
- Sport: Boxing
Medal record
Men's amateur boxing
Representing Canada
World Amateur Championships
Bronze medal – third place	1991 Sydney	Light heavyweight
Bronze medal – third place	1993 Tampere	Light heavyweight
Commonwealth Games
Gold medal – first place	1994 Victoria	Light heavyweight
Silver medal – second place	1990 Auckland	Light heavyweight
Pan American Games
Bronze medal – third place	1991 Havana	Light heavyweight

Robert Dale Brown (born December 15, 1971), known as Dale Brown, is a Canadian former professional boxer who competed from 1995 to 2007. As an amateur he represented Canada in the light heavyweight division at the 1992 Summer Olympics, losing to the eventual gold medallist Torsten May in the round of 16.

== Professional career ==
Born in Calgary, Alberta, Brown has been a contender in the Cruiserweight division since the late 1990s. He has unsuccessfully challenged for a world title three times; losing by stoppage to Vassiliy Jirov and Jean-Marc Mormeck, and by decision to O'Neill Bell in a fight guest analyst Kevin Kelley scored in Brown's favour. In his most recent bouts, Brown lost a 5-round technical decision to Shane Swartz and was KO'd by Darnell Wilson.

== Amateur career ==
As an amateur Brown represented Canada as a Light Heavyweight in the 1992 Barcelona Olympic Games. His results were:

- Defeated Damidin Zul (Mongolia) RSC 2 (3:00)
- Lost to Torsten May (Germany) 1-7

A year before his Olympic stint Brown won the bronze medal at the Pan American Games in Havana, Cuba. He did the same at the 1993 World Amateur Boxing Championships in Tampere, Finland.

== Professional boxing record ==
35 Wins (22 knockouts, 13 decisions), 6 Losses (4 knockouts, 2 decisions), 1 Draw
Result	Record	Opponent	Type	Round	Date	Location	Notes
Loss	19-5-3	Darnell Wilson	TKO	2	19/01/2007	Edmonton, Alberta, Canada	
Loss	17-4	Shane Swartz	TD	5	30/06/2006	Hollywood, Florida, U.S.	
Win	27-35-1	Dennis McKinney	UD	6	15/12/2005	Hollywood, Florida, U.S.	
Win	41-10	Damon Reed	TKO	5	27/08/2005	Chestermere Lake, Alberta, Canada	
Loss	23-1-1	O'Neil Bell	UD	12	20/05/2005	Hollywood, Florida, U.S.	For IBF cruiserweight title
Win	15-1	Shelby Gross	TKO	5	04/02/2005	Hollywood, Florida, U.S.	
Win	17-6	Jermell Barnes	UD	12	28/10/2004	Hollywood, Florida, U.S.	
Win	45-6-1	Robert Daniels	SD	12	08/06/2004	Hollywood, Florida, U.S.	
Win	28-4-1	Rich LaMontagne	UD	10	01/08/2003	Hampton Beach, New Hampshire, U.S.	
Win	10-1-1	Kevin Petty	KO	2	14/03/2003	Winnipeg, Manitoba, Canada	
Loss	27-2	Jean-Marc Mormeck	TKO	8	10/08/2002	Marseille, France	For WBA cruiserweight title
Win	10-5	Yohan Gimenez	TKO	5	31/05/2002	Bucharest, Romania	
Win	18-7-2	Greg Wright	UD	12	26/04/2002	Mississauga, Ontario, Canada	
Win	13-4-1	Rick Roufus	TKO	9	30/11/2001	Montreal, Quebec, Canada	
Win	12-1	Chris Brown	TKO	1	10/07/2001	Montreal, Quebec, Canada	
Win	15-2-2	Sione Asipeli	UD	10	03/11/2000	Montreal, Quebec, Canada	
Win	20-15-2	Mike Peak	UD	8	16/08/2000	Montreal, Quebec, Canada	
Win	16-2-1	Willard Lewis	TKO	7	16/06/2000	Montreal, Quebec, Canada	Canada Cruiserweight Title. Referee stopped the bout at 3:00 of the seventh round.
Win	24-11	Matthew Charleston	TKO	2	09/05/2000	Montreal, Quebec, Canada	Referee stopped the bout at 2:11 of the second round.
Loss	10-0	Wayne Braithwaite	TKO	8	12/02/2000	Uncasville, Connecticut, U.S.	NABF/WBC International Cruiserweight Titles. Referee stopped the bout at 1:44 of the eighth round.
Win	10-20-8	Wesley Martin	UD	8	29/10/1999	Montreal, Quebec, Canada	
Loss	21-0	Vassiliy Jirov	KO	10	18/09/1999	Las Vegas, Nevada, U.S.	For IBF cruiserweight title
Win	12-6-4	Sajad Abdul Aziz	UD	12	28/05/1999	Montreal, Quebec, Canada	NABF Cruiserweight Title.
Win	9-10	Val Smith	TKO	2	05/02/1999	Montreal, Quebec, Canada	Referee stopped the bout at 1:39 of the second round.
Win	11-0	David Washington	TKO	8	14/10/1998	Montreal, Quebec, Canada	Referee stopped the bout at 2:30 of the eighth round.
Win	31-10	Leslie Stewart	UD	12	28/05/1998	White Plains, New York, U.S.	NABF Cruiserweight Title.
Win	33-11	Art Jimmerson	KO	3	03/04/1998	Montreal, Quebec, Canada	NABF Cruiserweight Title. Jimmerson knocked out at 1:10 of the third round.
Win	27-7-1	Robert Folley	DQ	6	11/11/1997	Montreal, Quebec, Canada	Referee disqualified Folley at 2:34 of the sixth round.
Win	55-34-1	Bobby Crabtree	KO	1	04/10/1997	Lethbridge, Alberta, Canada	NABF Cruiserweight Title.
Win	7-2-2	Leon Gray	MD	10	04/07/1997	Nanaimo, British Columbia, Canada	
Win	28-4-2	Brian LaSpada	TKO	8	05/05/1997	Calgary, Alberta, Canada	NABF Cruiserweight Title. Referee stopped the bout at 2:57 of the eighth round.
Win	0-1	Marcelo Aravena	TKO	5	20/02/1997	Winnipeg, Manitoba, Canada	
Draw	27-3-1	Brian LaSpada	TD	6	18/08/1996	Calgary, Alberta, Canada	NABF Cruiserweight Title.
Win	--	Teddy Adeoba	TKO	2	31/05/1996	Victoria, British Columbia, Canada	
Win	0-1	Shawn Elliott	TKO	2	11/04/1996	Vancouver, British Columbia, Canada	Referee stopped the bout at 2:50 of the second round.
Win	15-17-2	Dave Fiddler	TKO	2	12/03/1996	Winnipeg, Manitoba, Canada	CPBC Cruiserweight Title.
Win	2-2	Derrell Banks	UD	6	25/01/1996	Toronto, Ontario, Canada	
Win	4-33	Donnie Penelton	TKO	4	14/12/1995	Winnipeg, Manitoba, Canada	Referee stopped the bout at 1:15 of the fourth round.
Win	4-14	Dean Shannon	KO	1	25/10/1995	Edmonton, Alberta, Canada	Shannon knocked out at 2:58 of the first round.
Win	5-5-2	Maurice Harris	KO	3	16/08/1995	Newark, New Jersey, U.S.	
Win	1-5-1	Dan Laliberte	KO	4	23/05/1995	Nanaimo, British Columbia, Canada	Laliberte knocked out at 2:00 of the fourth round.
Win	0-2	Thaddeus Carney	TKO	1	28/04/1995	Bushkill, Pennsylvania, U.S.	
