= Jacklord Jacobs =

Nigerian boxer (born 1970)

Medal record

Representing Nigeria

Men's Boxing

World Amateur Championships
Silver medal – second place	1993 Tampere	Light Heavyweight

All-Africa Games
Gold medal – first place	1991 Cairo	Light Heavyweight

Jacklord Bolaji Jacobs (born 1 January 1970 in Benin) is a Nigerian former professional boxer who competed from 1994 to 2003. As an amateur he represented Nigeria at the 1992 Summer Olympics in Barcelona, Spain. A year later he won the silver medal at the 1993 World Amateur Boxing Championships in Tampere, Finland, where he was beaten in the final of the light heavyweight (– 81 kg) division by Cuba's Ramón Garbey.

== Amateur Accomplishments ==
- Gold Medalist at the 1987 State Championship in Benin City, Nigeria as a Light-heavyweight.
- Gold Medalist at the 1989 Nigeria National Championship in Lagos State, Nigeria as a Light-heavyweight.
- Gold Medalist at the 1990 President Ibrahim Babangida Championship in Lagos State, Nigeria as a Light-heavyweight.
- Silver Medalist at the 1990 Boxgala in Germany as a Light-heavyweight.
- Gold Medalist at the 1991 All-Africa Games in Cairo as a Light-heavyweight, defeating Paulo Maaselbe of Tanzania in the final.
- Gold Medalist at the 1991 TLC Berlin in Germany as a Light-heavyweight.
- Represented Nigeria at the 1991 World Championship in Sydney, Australia as a Light-heavyweight.
- Represented Nigeria at the 1992 Barcelona Olympic Games in Barcelona, Spain as a Light-heavyweight.
  - His results were:
  - 1st round bye
  - Lost to Rostislav Zaulichniy (Unified Team) 8-16
- Silver Medalist at the 1993 World Amateur Boxing Championship in Tampere, Finland as a Light-heavyweight.
- Gold Medalist at the 1993 Amateur President Babangida Cup in Lagos State, Nigeria as a Light-heavyweight where he captained the national team.
- Total amateur fights - 110
  - Won 105
  - Lost 5

== Pro career ==
In 1994 he made his debut as a professional.
