= Mohamed Ben Guesmia =

Algerian boxer (born 1973)

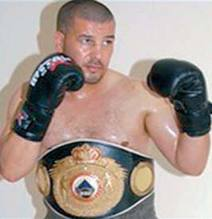
- Mohamed Ben Guesmia

Personal information
- Nationality: Algerian
- Born: 8 January 1973 (age 52); Boufarik, Algeria

Sport
- Sport: Boxing

Mohamed Ben Guesmia (born 8 January 1973) is an Algerian former professional boxer who competed from 1997 to 2012. As an amateur, he competed in the men's light heavyweight event at the 1992 Summer Olympics.
