= Patrice Aouissi =

French boxer (1966–2023)

Personal information
- Nationality: French
- Born: 24 February 1966 Lyon, France
- Died: 8 July 2023 (aged 57)

Sport
- Sport: Boxing

Patrice Aouissi (24 February 1966 – 8 July 2023) was a French professional boxer who competed from 1990 to 2000, challenging for the WBC cruiserweight title in 1996. As an amateur, he passed the first round of the men's light heavyweight tournament at the 1992 Summer Olympics.

== Biography ==
Patrice Aouissi was born on February 24, 1966, in Lyon.

He won a gold medal in the light heavyweight division at the 1991 Mediterranean Games in Athens. He was eliminated in the round of 16 of the light heavyweight division by Roland Raforme of the Seychelles at the 1992 Olympic Games in Barcelona. He then turned professional that same year with Paris Saint-Germain Boxing.

The 1994 French light heavyweight champion, he was crowned EBU European champion in the same weight class on March 14, 1995, defeating Ukrainian Alexander Gurov in Levallois-Perret title he would lose to the same opponent on October 24, 1995. He then lost the WBC light heavyweight world title fight to Argentine Marcelo Domínguez on July 5, 1996, in Hyères. He retired from professional boxing in 2000.

He then joined the Vienne, Isère Municipal Police and also served as a boxing coach for the Pont-Évêque club.

Suffering from advanced cancer, he died of a stroke on July 8, 2023, in Villeurbanne.
