= Angel Espinosa =

Cuban boxer (1966–2017)

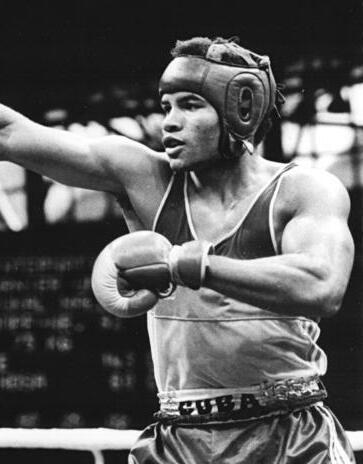

Personal information
- Full name: Angel Espinosa Capó
- Nationality: Cuba
- Born: 2 October 1966 Holguín, Cuba
- Died: 12 April 2017 (aged 50) Miami, Florida, US
- Height: 1.60 m (5 ft 3 in)
- Weight: 75 kg (165 lb)

Sport
- Sport: Boxing
- Weight class: Middleweight
Medal record
World Championships
Gold medal – first place	1986 Reno	Light Middleweight
Silver medal – second place	1989 Moscow	Middleweight
World Cup
Gold medal – first place	1987 Belgrade	Middleweight
Pan American Games
Gold medal – first place	1987 Indianapolis	Middleweight
Central American and Caribbean Games
Gold medal – first place	1986 Santiago	Light Middleweight
Friendship Games
Gold medal – first place	1984 Havana	Light Middleweight

Ángel Espinosa Capó (2 October 1966 – 12 April 2017) was a Cuban amateur boxer who dominated the 1980s at junior middleweight and middleweight and captured the 1986 World Amateur Boxing Championships. He never won an Olympic medal due to Cuba's boycott of the 1984 and 1988 Summer Olympics (as well as the 1985 Boxing World Cup boycott.) A hard-hitting Cuban with a southpaw stance, Espinosa was one of the most feared in his era and was known to have about 300 amateur fights.

== Career ==
In 1983, Espinosa won the junior world championships at junior welterweight by knocking out Meldrick Taylor in round 2. Cuba boycotted the 1984 Olympic Games.

He became 1986 world champion at junior middleweight. Espinosa then added the Panamerican title 1987 at middleweight.

On two occasions when Cuban government boycotted the Boxing World Cup in 1985, and the Summer Olympics in 1988, gold winner in the middleweight class was East German Henry Maske, whom Espinosa defeated three times unanimously in 1987–88.

At the 1989 world championships, Espinosa defeated Sven Ottke, but lost to Andrey Kurnyavka. At Espinosa's first Olympics in Barcelona 1992, he competed at light-heavy and lost to Wojciech Bartnik. Espinosa trained amateurs in a boxing gym in Hialeah, Florida named "Hialeah School of Boxing" before his death.

Espinosa was found dead at a gym in Miami. His cause of death is still undetermined.
