= Weightlifting at the 2024 Summer Olympics – Qualification =

This article details the qualifying phase for weightlifting at the 2024 Summer Olympics. The competition at these Games comprises a total of 120 weightlifters coming from different nations; each is permitted to enter a maximum of three weightlifters per gender, and a maximum of one per weight category.

== Qualification system ==
Each of the ten bodyweight categories consists of twelve weightlifters coming from different NOCs. These qualification spots are distributed to the following criteria below:

- IWF Olympic Qualification Ranking (as of April 28, 2024) – The ten highest-ranked weightlifters (by name and NOC) will obtain a quota place for their respective NOC and bodyweight category through the biennial IWF Olympic Qualification Ranking list (running from August 1, 2022, to April 28, 2024). If a weightlifter ranks in the top ten of the OQR for more than one weight category, the NOC involved must declare to the IWF which weightlifting event will he or she compete at the Games by May 10, 2024. If the NOC contains more than three athletes per gender across different weight categories in the top 10 of the OQR, the NOC must declare to the IWF which athletes they decide will be allocated the Olympic quota places.
- IWF Olympic Continental Qualification Ranking (as of April 28, 2024) – To achieve the widest possible representation across the IWF-recognized continental federations (Africa, the Americas, Asia, Europe, and Oceania), a single quota place is distributed to the highest-ranked eligible weightlifter, representing the NOC whose continent lies outside the top ten of his or her respective bodyweight category.
- Host nation – As the host country, France reserves two men and two women quota places across the different bodyweight categories. If less than two French weightlifters, whether male or female, qualify regularly and directly through the OQR, they may add more eligible athletes of their choice to attain the maximum guaranteed quota places, respecting the three-member limit per NOC.
- Universality places – Six invitational places (three per gender) will be entitled to eligible NOCs interested to have their weightlifters compete in Paris 2024 as granted by the Universality principle.

The quota places obtained by the ranking list (including continental places) and the Tripartite Commission (or Universality Invitation) are awarded to the specific weightlifter by name. Those for the host nation are distributed to the NOC which could allocate them among the various weight classes. If French weightlifters qualify through the ranking list, the number of host nation places would decrease (that is, the host places would only be used if France enters fewer than three men and three women, and only so many as needed to bring France up to those numbers would be used). Unused host places would be awarded through the IWF Olympic Qualification Ranking list.

To be eligible for Paris 2024, all weightlifters must compete at the 2023 IWF World Championships in Riyadh, Saudi Arabia, at the 2024 IWF World Cup in Phuket, Thailand, and in three or more qualifying tournaments as listed in the timeline section. Apart from two compulsory events, the host country France and those eligible for the Universality invitational places may compete in a minimum of two qualifying tournaments.

Each NOC is permitted to enter one weightlifter per bodyweight category and three per gender across all weight classes. The maximum number of athletes per NOC across all weight classes could also be limited because of the consequences wreaked by the anti-doping violations. Breaching an obligation under the IWF Anti-Doping Rule, failing to comply with any directives or requests on anti-doping matters issued by IWF, or committing three or more anti-doping violations sanctioned by IWF throughout the qualification calendar would forfeit some or all quota places obtained by any NOC at the Games.

== Timeline ==
Event	Date	Venue
2022 World Championships	December 5–16, 2022	Bogotá, Colombia
2023 Pan American Championships	March 25 – April 2, 2023	Bariloche, Argentina
2023 European Championships	April 15–23, 2023	Yerevan, Armenia
2023 Asian Championships	May 5–13, 2023	Jinju, South Korea
2023 African Championships	May 11–20, 2023	Tunis, Tunisia
2023 IWF Grand Prix #1	June 8–18, 2023	Havana, Cuba
2023 World Championships*	September 2–17, 2023	Riyadh, Saudi Arabia
2023 Pacific Games	November 20–24, 2023	Honiara, Solomon Islands
2023 IWF Grand Prix #2	December 2–12, 2023	Doha, Qatar
2024 African Championships	February 2–10, 2024	Ismailia, Egypt
2024 Asian Championships	February 3–10, 2024	Tashkent, Uzbekistan
2024 European Championships	February 12–20, 2024	Sofia, Bulgaria
2024 Oceania Championships	February 21–25, 2024	Auckland, New Zealand
2024 Pan American Championships	February 23–29, 2024	Caracas, Venezuela
2024 IWF World Cup*	March 31–April 11, 2024	Phuket, Thailand

* Compulsory event – all weightlifters must compete in the event to acquire eligibility for Paris 2024

== Qualification summary ==
Nation	Men					Women					Total
Nation	61 kg	73 kg	89 kg	102 kg	+102 kg	49 kg	59 kg	71 kg	81 kg	+81 kg	Total
Algeria					Yes						1
Armenia			Yes	Yes	Yes						3
Australia			Yes					Yes	Yes		3
Bahrain				Yes	Yes						2
Belgium						Yes					1
Brazil								Yes	Yes		2
Bulgaria	Yes	Yes	Yes								3
Canada			Yes				Yes				2
China	Yes	Yes		Yes		Yes	Yes			Yes	6
Chinese Taipei						Yes	Yes	Yes			3
Colombia		Yes	Yes				Yes	Yes			4
Cuba									Yes		1
Czech Republic					Yes						1
Dominican Republic						Yes			Yes	Yes	3
Ecuador								Yes	Yes	Yes	3
Egypt			Yes		Yes			Yes	Yes	Yes	5
Estonia					Yes						1
France		Yes	Yes				Yes	Yes			4
Georgia	Yes			Yes	Yes						3
Great Britain										Yes	1
Guam						Yes					1
India						Yes					1
Individual Neutral Athletes				Yes				Yes			2
Indonesia	Yes	Yes								Yes	3
Iran			Yes		Yes						2
Iraq					Yes						1
Italy	Yes		Yes				Yes				3
Japan		Yes			Yes	Yes					3
Kiribati	Yes										1
Latvia		Yes									1
Libya				Yes							1
Madagascar						Yes					1
Marshall Islands							Yes				1
Malaysia	Yes										1
Mexico							Yes				1
Moldova			Yes								1
Mongolia									Yes		1
New Zealand					Yes						1
Nigeria							Yes	Yes			2
Norway									Yes		1
Papua New Guinea	Yes										1
Philippines	Yes						Yes	Yes			3
Poland									Yes		1
Qatar				Yes							1
Romania						Yes		Yes			2
Refugee Olympic Team				Yes					Yes		2
Samoa				Yes						Yes	2
South Korea		Yes	Yes	Yes					Yes	Yes	5
Syria					Yes						1
Thailand	Yes	Yes				Yes				Yes	4
Tunisia		Yes									1
Turkey		Yes									1
Turkmenistan				Yes							1
Ukraine							Yes				1
United States	Yes			Yes		Yes		Yes		Yes	5
Uzbekistan				Yes					Yes	Yes	3
Vanuatu									Yes		1
Venezuela		Yes	Yes			Yes	Yes			Yes	5
Vietnam	Yes										1
Total: 57 NOCs	12	12	12	13	12	12	12	12	13	12	122

== Men's events ==
=== 61 kg ===
Section	Places	NOC	Qualified weightlifter
IWF Olympic Qualification Ranking (as of April 28, 2024)	10	China	Li Fabin
IWF Olympic Qualification Ranking (as of April 28, 2024)	10	United States	Hampton Morris
IWF Olympic Qualification Ranking (as of April 28, 2024)	10	Italy	Sergio Massidda
IWF Olympic Qualification Ranking (as of April 28, 2024)	10	Indonesia	Eko Yuli Irawan
IWF Olympic Qualification Ranking (as of April 28, 2024)	10	Philippines	John Ceniza
IWF Olympic Qualification Ranking (as of April 28, 2024)	10	Thailand	Theerapong Silachai
IWF Olympic Qualification Ranking (as of April 28, 2024)	10	Georgia	Shota Mishvelidze
IWF Olympic Qualification Ranking (as of April 28, 2024)	10	Malaysia	Aniq Kasdan
IWF Olympic Qualification Ranking (as of April 28, 2024)	10	Vietnam	Trịnh Văn Vinh
IWF Olympic Qualification Ranking (as of April 28, 2024)	10	Bulgaria	Ivan Dimov
IWF Olympic Continental Qualification Ranking	1	Papua New Guinea	Morea Baru
Host country or Universality place	1	Kiribati	Kaimauri Erati
Total	12		

=== 73 kg ===
Section	Places	NOC	Qualified weightlifter
IWF Olympic Qualification Ranking (as of April 28, 2024)	10	Indonesia	Rizki Juniansyah
IWF Olympic Qualification Ranking (as of April 28, 2024)	10	China	Shi Zhiyong
IWF Olympic Qualification Ranking (as of April 28, 2024)	10	Japan	Masanori Miyamoto
IWF Olympic Qualification Ranking (as of April 28, 2024)	10	Thailand	Weeraphon Wichuma
IWF Olympic Qualification Ranking (as of April 28, 2024)	10	Bulgaria	Bozhidar Andreev
IWF Olympic Qualification Ranking (as of April 28, 2024)	10	South Korea	Bak Joo-hyo
IWF Olympic Qualification Ranking (as of April 28, 2024)	10	Latvia	Ritvars Suharevs
IWF Olympic Qualification Ranking (as of April 28, 2024)	10	Turkey	Muhammed Furkan Özbek
IWF Olympic Qualification Ranking (as of April 28, 2024)	10	Venezuela	Julio Mayora
IWF Olympic Qualification Ranking (as of April 28, 2024)	10	Colombia	Luis Javier Mosquera
IWF Olympic Continental Qualification Ranking	1	Tunisia	Karem Ben Hnia
Host country or Universality place	1	France	Bernardin Matam
Total	12		

=== 89 kg ===
Section	Places	NOC	Qualified weightlifter
IWF Olympic Qualification Ranking (as of April 28, 2024)	10	Bulgaria	Karlos May Nasar
IWF Olympic Qualification Ranking (as of April 28, 2024)	10	Colombia	Yeison López
IWF Olympic Qualification Ranking (as of April 28, 2024)	10	Venezuela	Keydomar Vallenilla
IWF Olympic Qualification Ranking (as of April 28, 2024)	10	Iran	Mirmostafa Javadi
IWF Olympic Qualification Ranking (as of April 28, 2024)	10	Egypt	Karim Abokahla
IWF Olympic Qualification Ranking (as of April 28, 2024)	10	Italy	Antonino Pizzolato
IWF Olympic Qualification Ranking (as of April 28, 2024)	10	Moldova	Marin Robu
IWF Olympic Qualification Ranking (as of April 28, 2024)	10	Armenia	Andranik Karapetyan
IWF Olympic Qualification Ranking (as of April 28, 2024)	10	South Korea	Yu Dong-ju
IWF Olympic Qualification Ranking (as of April 28, 2024)	10	Canada	Boady Santavy
IWF Olympic Continental Qualification Ranking	1	Australia	Kyle Bruce
Host country or Universality place	1	France	Romain Imadouchène
Total	12		

=== 102 kg ===
Section	Places	NOC	Qualified weightlifter
IWF Olympic Qualification Ranking (as of April 28, 2024)	10	China	Liu Huanhua
IWF Olympic Qualification Ranking (as of April 28, 2024)	10	Armenia	Garik Karapetyan
IWF Olympic Qualification Ranking (as of April 28, 2024)	10	Qatar	Fares El-Bakh
IWF Olympic Qualification Ranking (as of April 28, 2024)	10	Uzbekistan	Akbar Djuraev
IWF Olympic Qualification Ranking (as of April 28, 2024)	10	Individual Neutral Athletes	Yauheni Tsikhantsou
IWF Olympic Qualification Ranking (as of April 28, 2024)	10	South Korea	Jang Yeon-hak
IWF Olympic Qualification Ranking (as of April 28, 2024)	10	Bahrain	Lesman Paredes
IWF Olympic Qualification Ranking (as of April 28, 2024)	10	Turkmenistan	Döwranbek Hasanbaýew
IWF Olympic Qualification Ranking (as of April 28, 2024)	10	Georgia	Irakli Chkheidze
IWF Olympic Qualification Ranking (as of April 28, 2024)	10	Samoa	Don Opeloge
IWF Olympic Continental Qualification Ranking	1	United States	Wesley Kitts
Host country or Universality place	1	Libya	Ahmed Abuzriba
Invitational Place	1	Refugee Olympic Team	Ramiro Mora Romero
Total	13		

=== +102 kg ===
Section	Places	NOC	Qualified weightlifter
IWF Olympic Qualification Ranking (as of April 28, 2024)	10	Georgia	Lasha Talakhadze
IWF Olympic Qualification Ranking (as of April 28, 2024)	10	Bahrain	Gor Minasyan
IWF Olympic Qualification Ranking (as of April 28, 2024)	10	Armenia	Varazdat Lalayan
IWF Olympic Qualification Ranking (as of April 28, 2024)	10	Iran	Ali Davoudi
IWF Olympic Qualification Ranking (as of April 28, 2024)	10	Syria	Man Asaad
IWF Olympic Qualification Ranking (as of April 28, 2024)	10	Egypt	Abdelrahman El-Sayed
IWF Olympic Qualification Ranking (as of April 28, 2024)	10	Iraq	Ali Rubaiawi
IWF Olympic Qualification Ranking (as of April 28, 2024)	10	Algeria	Walid Bidani
IWF Olympic Qualification Ranking (as of April 28, 2024)	10	Japan	Eishiro Murakami
IWF Olympic Qualification Ranking (as of April 28, 2024)	10	Czech Republic	Kamil Kučera
IWF Olympic Continental Qualification Ranking	1	New Zealand	David Liti
Host country or Universality place (Re-allocation)	1	Estonia	Mart Seim
Total	12		

== Women's events ==
=== 49 kg ===
Section	Places	NOC	Qualified weightlifter
IWF Olympic Qualification Ranking (as of April 28, 2024)	10	China	Hou Zhihui
IWF Olympic Qualification Ranking (as of April 28, 2024)	10	India	Saikhom Mirabai Chanu
IWF Olympic Qualification Ranking (as of April 28, 2024)	10	Thailand	Surodchana Khambao
IWF Olympic Qualification Ranking (as of April 28, 2024)	10	United States	Jourdan Delacruz
IWF Olympic Qualification Ranking (as of April 28, 2024)	10	Romania	Mihaela Cambei
IWF Olympic Qualification Ranking (as of April 28, 2024)	10	Japan	Rira Suzuki
IWF Olympic Qualification Ranking (as of April 28, 2024)	10	Belgium	Nina Sterckx (Note: She has also qualified in the 59 kg.)
IWF Olympic Qualification Ranking (as of April 28, 2024)	10	Venezuela	Katherin Echandia
IWF Olympic Qualification Ranking (as of April 28, 2024)	10	Chinese Taipei	Fang Wan-ling
IWF Olympic Qualification Ranking (as of April 28, 2024)	10	Dominican Republic	Beatriz Pirón
IWF Olympic Continental Qualification Ranking	1	Madagascar	Rosina Randafiarison
Host country or Universality place	1	Guam	Nicola Lagatao
Total	12		

=== 59 kg ===
Section	Places	NOC	Qualified weightlifter
IWF Olympic Qualification Ranking (as of April 28, 2024)	10	China	Luo Shifang
IWF Olympic Qualification Ranking (as of April 28, 2024)	10	Ukraine	Kamila Konotop
IWF Olympic Qualification Ranking (as of April 28, 2024)	10	Canada	Maude Charron
IWF Olympic Qualification Ranking (as of April 28, 2024)	10	Colombia	Yenny Álvarez
IWF Olympic Qualification Ranking (as of April 28, 2024)	10	Chinese Taipei	Kuo Hsing-chun
IWF Olympic Qualification Ranking (as of April 28, 2024)	10	Venezuela	Anyelin Venegas
IWF Olympic Qualification Ranking (as of April 28, 2024)	10	Philippines	Elreen Ando
IWF Olympic Qualification Ranking (as of April 28, 2024)	10	Nigeria	Rafiatu Lawal
IWF Olympic Qualification Ranking (as of April 28, 2024)	10	Mexico	Janeth Gómez
IWF Olympic Qualification Ranking (as of April 28, 2024)	10	Italy	Lucrezia Magistris
IWF Olympic Continental Qualification Ranking	1	Marshall Islands	Mattie Sasser
Host country or Universality place	1	France	Dora Tchakounté
Total	12		

=== 71 kg ===
Section	Places	NOC	Qualified weightlifter
IWF Olympic Qualification Ranking (as of April 28, 2024)	10	United States	Olivia Reeves
IWF Olympic Qualification Ranking (as of April 28, 2024)	10	Ecuador	Angie Palacios
IWF Olympic Qualification Ranking (as of April 28, 2024)	10	Romania	Loredana Toma
IWF Olympic Qualification Ranking (as of April 28, 2024)	10	Philippines	Vanessa Sarno
IWF Olympic Qualification Ranking (as of April 28, 2024)	10	Egypt	Neama Said
IWF Olympic Qualification Ranking (as of April 28, 2024)	10	Chinese Taipei	Chen Wen-huei
IWF Olympic Qualification Ranking (as of April 28, 2024)	10	Colombia	Mari Sánchez
IWF Olympic Qualification Ranking (as of April 28, 2024)	10	Individual Neutral Athletes	Siuzanna Valodzka
IWF Olympic Qualification Ranking (as of April 28, 2024)	10	Nigeria	Joy Ogbonne Eze
IWF Olympic Qualification Ranking (as of April 28, 2024)	10	Brazil	Amanda Schott
IWF Olympic Continental Qualification Ranking	1	Australia	Jacqueline Nichele
Host country or Universality place	1	France	Marie Fegue
Total	12		

=== 81 kg ===
Section	Places	NOC	Qualified weightlifter
IWF Olympic Qualification Ranking (as of April 28, 2024)	10	Ecuador	Neisi Dájomes
IWF Olympic Qualification Ranking (as of April 28, 2024)	10	Egypt	Sara Ahmed
IWF Olympic Qualification Ranking (as of April 28, 2024)	10	Norway	Solfrid Koanda
IWF Olympic Qualification Ranking (as of April 28, 2024)	10	Australia	Eileen Cikamatana
IWF Olympic Qualification Ranking (as of April 28, 2024)	10	South Korea	Kim Su-hyeon
IWF Olympic Qualification Ranking (as of April 28, 2024)	10	Cuba	Ayamey Medina
IWF Olympic Qualification Ranking (as of April 28, 2024)	10	Brazil	Laura Amaro
IWF Olympic Qualification Ranking (as of April 28, 2024)	10	Dominican Republic	Yudelina Mejía
IWF Olympic Qualification Ranking (as of April 28, 2024)	10	Mongolia	Mönkhjantsangiin Ankhtsetseg
IWF Olympic Qualification Ranking (as of April 28, 2024)	10	Uzbekistan	Rigina Adashbaeva
Quota Reallocated	1	Poland	Weronika Zielińska-Stubińska
Host country or Universality place	1	Vanuatu	Ajah Pritchard Lolo
Invitational Place	1	Refugee Olympic Team	Yekta Jamali
Total	13		

=== +81 kg ===
Section	Places	NOC	Qualified weightlifter
IWF Olympic Qualification Ranking (as of April 28, 2024)	10	China	Li Wenwen
IWF Olympic Qualification Ranking (as of April 28, 2024)	10	South Korea	Park Hye-jeong
IWF Olympic Qualification Ranking (as of April 28, 2024)	10	Great Britain	Emily Campbell
IWF Olympic Qualification Ranking (as of April 28, 2024)	10	Thailand	Duangaksorn Chaidee
IWF Olympic Qualification Ranking (as of April 28, 2024)	10	United States	Mary Theisen-Lappen
IWF Olympic Qualification Ranking (as of April 28, 2024)	10	Ecuador	Lisseth Ayoví
IWF Olympic Qualification Ranking (as of April 28, 2024)	10	Egypt	Halima Abbas
IWF Olympic Qualification Ranking (as of April 28, 2024)	10	Venezuela	Naryury Pérez
IWF Olympic Qualification Ranking (as of April 28, 2024)	10	Samoa	Iuniarra Sipaia
IWF Olympic Qualification Ranking (as of April 28, 2024)	10	Dominican Republic	Crismery Santana
Quota Reallocated	1	Indonesia	Nurul Akmal
Host country or Universality place (Re-allocation)	1	Uzbekistan	Tursunoy Jabborova
Total	12		
