= 2023 World Weightlifting Championships – Men's +109 kg =

The men's +109 kilograms competition at the 2023 World Weightlifting Championships was held on 17 September 2023.

== Schedule ==
Date	Time	Event
17 September 2023	09:00	Group D
17 September 2023	11:30	Group C
17 September 2023	14:00	Group B
17 September 2023	16:30	Group A

== Medalists ==
Event	Gold		Silver		Bronze	
Snatch	Lasha Talakhadze (GEO)	220 kg	Gor Minasyan (BHR)	213 kg	Varazdat Lalayan (ARM)	212 kg
Clean & Jerk	Lasha Talakhadze (GEO)	253 kg	Simon Martirosyan (ARM)	250 kg	Ali Davoudi (IRI)	249 kg
Total	Lasha Talakhadze (GEO)	473 kg	Varazdat Lalayan (ARM)	460 kg	Gor Minasyan (BHR)	459 kg

== Records ==
Prior to this competition, the existing world records were as follows.

World Record	Snatch	Lasha Talakhadze (GEO)	225 kg	Tashkent, Uzbekistan	17 December 2021
World Record	Clean & Jerk	Lasha Talakhadze (GEO)	267 kg	Tashkent, Uzbekistan	17 December 2021
World Record	Total	Lasha Talakhadze (GEO)	492 kg	Tashkent, Uzbekistan	17 December 2021

== Results ==
Rank	Athlete	Group	Snatch (kg)				Clean & Jerk (kg)				Total
Rank	Athlete	Group	1	2	3	Rank	1	2	3	Rank	Total
1st place, gold medalist(s)	Lasha Talakhadze (GEO)	A	208	215	220	1st place, gold medalist(s)	245	253	~~260~~	1st place, gold medalist(s)	473
2nd place, silver medalist(s)	Varazdat Lalayan (ARM)	A	205	212	~~217~~	3rd place, bronze medalist(s)	242	248	~~255~~	4	460
3rd place, bronze medalist(s)	Gor Minasyan (BHR)	A	205	213	~~220~~	2nd place, silver medalist(s)	240	246	~~253~~	5	459
4	Ali Davoudi (IRI)	A	~~195~~	195	203	4	240	249	~~255~~	3rd place, bronze medalist(s)	452
5	Simon Martirosyan (ARM)	A	195	200	~~205~~	6	240	250	~~255~~	2nd place, silver medalist(s)	450
6	Eduard Ziaziulin (AIN)	A	~~200~~	~~201~~	201	5	230	~~240~~	~~243~~	7	431
7	Ali Rubaiawi (IRQ)	B	185	190	198 JWR	7	221	~~228~~	~~231~~	11	419
8	Lee Jae-sang (KOR)	B	170	~~175~~	175	18	227	~~241~~	241	6	416
9	David Liti (NZL)	B	174	178	181	12	~~224~~	~~224~~	226	8	407
10	Mart Seim (EST)	B	175	180	~~185~~	13	~~225~~	225	~~232~~	9	405
11	Eishiro Murakami (JPN)	B	176	181	~~185~~	11	220	~~225~~	~~231~~	12	401
12	Bakari Turmanidze (GEO)	B	176	181	185	10	214	~~220~~	~~221~~	14	399
13	Oleh Hanzenko (UKR)	C	173	179	~~184~~	14	~~210~~	~~210~~	211	17	390
14	Hojamuhammet Toýçyýew (TKM)	B	175	~~180~~	~~181~~	17	~~215~~	~~215~~	215	13	390
15	Anthony Coullet (FRA)	C	160	~~165~~	165	23	205	215	222	10	387
16	Caine Wilkes (USA)	C	165	170	175	16	203	211	~~216~~	16	386
17	Sanele Mao (SAM)	C	170	175	~~180~~	15	210	~~217~~	~~220~~	18	385
18	Péter Nagy (HUN)	C	162	168	168	22	205	213	~~219~~	15	381
19	Alejandro Medina (USA)	C	165	170	~~175~~	21	203	~~210~~	~~217~~	19	373
20	David Litvinov (ISR)	C	155	161	~~166~~	24	~~195~~	195	200	20	361
21	Gilberto Lemus (GUA)	D	160.	170	~~175~~	20	~~190~~	190	~~200~~	23	360
22	Ragnar Holme (NOR)	C	~~157~~	157	~~163~~	26	195	~~200~~	—	21	352
23	Hassan Al-Radhi (KSA)	D	145	152	156	27	182	190	~~195~~	22	346
24	Bilal Bouamr (MAR)	D	150	~~156~~	~~157~~	28	180	186	~~190~~	24	336
25	Križan Rajič (CRO)	D	140	145	~~150~~	29	170	175	179	25	324
26	Fazal Karim Turkmen (AFG)	D	130	135	140	30	170	~~175~~	178	26	318
27	Bokang Kagiso (BOT)	D	~~120~~	120	—	31	145	—	—	27	265
28	Muratbyekiin Bakhbyergyen (MGL)	D	105	108	~~111~~	32	133	138	~~142~~	28	246
—	Ayat Sharifi (IRI)	A	192	~~199~~	~~202~~	8	~~233~~	~~233~~	~~242~~	—	—
—	Kamil Kučera (CZE)	B	~~175~~	~~175~~	~~176~~	—	—	—	—	—	—
—	Jo Seong-bin (KOR)	B	180	189	191	9	~~221~~	~~222~~	~~222~~	—	—
—	Arkadiusz Michalski (POL)	C	~~168~~	~~168~~	~~171~~	—	—	—	—	—	—
—	Jin Cheng (TPE)	C	150	160	~~170~~	25	~~190~~	~~190~~	—	—	—
—	Tamaš Kajdoči (SRB)	C	165	172	~~177~~	19	—	—	—	—	—
—	Abdelrahman El-Sayed (EGY)	D	~~180~~	~~185~~	~~185~~	—	—	—	—	—	—
—	Rustam Djangabaev (UZB)	A	—	—	—	—	—	—	—	—	—
—	Walid Bidani (ALG)	B	—	—	—	—	—	—	—	—	—
—	Man Asaad (SYR)	D	—	—	—	—	—	—	—	—	—
—	Enzo Kuworge (NED)	D	—	—	—	—	—	—	—	—	—
—	Kosuke Chinen (JPN)	D	—	—	—	—	—	—	—	—	—
—	Hernán Viera (PER)	D	—	—	—	—	—	—	—	—	—
—	Gurdeep Singh (IND)	D	—	—	—	—	—	—	—	—	—
—	Reza Rouhi (WRT)	C	Did not start								
