= List of Syrian records in Olympic weightlifting =

The following are the national records in Olympic weightlifting in Syria. Records are maintained in each weight class for the snatch lift, clean and jerk lift, and the total for both lifts by the Syrian Arab Weightlifting Federation.

== Current records ==
=== Men ===
Event	Record	Athlete	Date	Meet	Place	Ref
60 kg
Snatch						
Clean & Jerk						
Total						
65 kg
Snatch						
Clean & Jerk						
Total						
71 kg
Snatch						
Clean & Jerk						
Total						
79 kg
Snatch						
Clean & Jerk						
Total						
88 kg
Snatch	148 kg	Mohamad Al-Kateb	10 November 2025	Islamic Solidarity Games	Riyadh, Saudi Arabia	
Clean & Jerk	177 kg	Mohamad Al-Kateb	10 November 2025	Islamic Solidarity Games	Riyadh, Saudi Arabia	
Total	325 kg	Mohamad Al-Kateb	10 November 2025	Islamic Solidarity Games	Riyadh, Saudi Arabia	
94 kg
Snatch						
Clean & Jerk						
Total						
110 kg
Snatch	157 kg	Hamza Alasad Hallak	12 November 2025	Islamic Solidarity Games	Riyadh, Saudi Arabia	
Clean & Jerk	187 kg	Hamza Alasad Hallak	12 November 2025	Islamic Solidarity Games	Riyadh, Saudi Arabia	
Total	344 kg	Hamza Alasad Hallak	12 November 2025	Islamic Solidarity Games	Riyadh, Saudi Arabia	
+110 kg
Snatch						
Clean & Jerk						
Total						

=== Women ===
Event	Record	Athlete	Date	Meet	Place	Ref
48 kg
Snatch						
Clean & Jerk						
Total						
53 kg
Snatch						
Clean & Jerk						
Total						
58 kg
Snatch						
Clean & Jerk						
Total						
63 kg
Snatch						
Clean & Jerk						
Total						
69 kg
Snatch						
Clean & Jerk						
Total						
77 kg
Snatch						
Clean & Jerk						
Total						
86 kg
Snatch						
Clean & Jerk						
Total						
+86 kg
Snatch						
Clean & Jerk						
Total						

== Historical records ==
=== Men (2018–2025) ===
Event	Record	Athlete	Date	Meet	Place	Ref
55 kg
Snatch						
Clean and Jerk						
Total						
61 kg
Snatch						
Clean & Jerk						
Total						
67 kg
Snatch						
Clean & Jerk						
Total						
73 kg
Snatch						
Clean and Jerk						
Total						
81 kg
Snatch						
Clean and Jerk						
Total						
89 kg
Snatch						
Clean and Jerk						
Total						
96 kg
Snatch						
Clean and Jerk						
Total						
102 kg
Snatch						
Clean and Jerk						
Total						
109 kg
Snatch						
Clean and Jerk						
Total						
+109 kg
Snatch	198 kg	Man Asaad	16 December 2022	World Championships	Bogotá, Colombia	
Clean and Jerk	252 kg	Man Asaad	10 February 2024	Asian Championships	Tashkent, Uzbekistan	
Total	445 kg	Man Asaad	16 December 2022	World Championships	Bogotá, Colombia	

=== Women (2018–2025) ===
Event	Record	Athlete	Date	Meet	Place	Ref
45 kg
Snatch						
Clean and Jerk						
Total						
49 kg
Snatch						
Clean and Jerk						
Total						
55 kg
Snatch						
Clean and Jerk						
Total						
59 kg
Snatch						
Clean & Jerk						
Total						
64 kg
Snatch						
Clean and Jerk						
Total						
71 kg
Snatch	85 kg	Dyab Nahil	25 April 2019	Asian Championships	Ningbo, China	
Clean and Jerk						
Total						
76 kg
Snatch						
Clean and Jerk						
Total						
81 kg
Snatch						
Clean and Jerk						
Total						
87 kg
Snatch						
Clean and Jerk						
Total						
+87 kg
Snatch						
Clean and Jerk						
Total						
