= Weightlifting at the 2017 Summer Universiade – Men's +105 kg =

Men's +105 kg at the XXIX Summer Universiade
- Venues: Tamkang University Shao-Mo Memorial Gymnasium 7F
- Dates: 26 August 2017
- Competitors: 18 from 15 nations

Medalists
1st place, gold medalist(s)		Gor Minasyan	Armenia
2nd place, silver medalist(s)		Chen Shih-chieh	Chinese Taipei
3rd place, bronze medalist(s)		Hwang Woo-man	South Korea

The men's +105 kg event at the 2017 Summer Universiade was held on 25 August at the Tamkang University Shao-Mo Memorial Gymnasium 7F.

== Records ==
Prior to this competition, the existing world and Universiade records were as follows.

- Initial records

Category		Nation	Athlete	Record	Place	Date	Meet
World record	Snatch	Georgia	Lasha Talakhadze	217 kg	Split, Croatia	8 April 2017	2017 European Championships
World record	Clean & Jerk	Iran	Hossein Rezazadeh	263 kg	Athens, Greece	25 August 2004	2004 Summer Olympics
World record	Total	Georgia	Lasha Talakhadze	473 kg	Split, Croatia	8 April 2017	2017 European Championships
Universiade records	Snatch	Russia (RUS)	Ruslan Albegov	205 kg	Kazan, Russia	12 July 2013	2013 Summer Universiade
Universiade records	Clean & Jerk	Iran (IRI)	Bahador Molaei	254 kg	Kazan, Russia	12 July 2013	2013 Summer Universiade
Universiade records	Total	Russia (RUS)	Ruslan Albegov	459 kg	Kazan, Russia	12 July 2013	2013 Summer Universiade

== Results ==
Rank	Athlete	Group	Body weight	Snatch (kg)				Clean & Jerk (kg)				Total
Rank	Athlete	Group	Body weight	1	2	3	Result	1	2	3	Result	Total
1st place, gold medalist(s)	Gor Minasyan (ARM)	A	138.84	195	200	~~206~~	200	~~230~~	230	~~235~~	230	430
2nd place, silver medalist(s)	Chen Shih-chieh (TPE)	A	151.63	180	190	~~196~~	190	225	~~241~~	~~241~~	225	415
3rd place, bronze medalist(s)	Hwang Woo-man (KOR)	A	130.67	178	183	~~187~~	183	208	~~216~~	216	216	399
4	Mohsen Dadrasasl (IRI)	A	161.17	176	180	~~183~~	180	212	~~220~~	~~220~~	212	392
5	Przemysław Budek (POL)	A	118.76	170	175	~~181~~	175	210	~~218~~	~~218~~	210	385
6	Alexej Prochorow (GER)	A	131.08	170	175	~~180~~	175	195	203	208	208	383
7	Mykyta Proshynskyi (UKR)	A	138.74	165	170	~~175~~	170	205	211	~~215~~	211	381
8	Kosuke Chinen (JPN)	A	144.37	170	175	~~180~~	175	205	~~213~~	~~215~~	205	380
9	Tamaš Kajdoči (SRB)	B	145.70	165	~~170~~	170	170	200	205	210	210	380
10	Eishiro Murakami (JPN)	A	136.24	165	171	~~176~~	171	201	206	~~211~~	206	377
11	Maksym Kobets (UKR)	A	119.39	165	170	~~175~~	170	200	205	~~208~~	205	375
12	Azar Mammadli (AZE)	A	158.42	160	~~165~~	~~165~~	160	200	205	210	210	370
13	Radoslav Tatarčík (SVK)	B	112.12	166	171	175	175	~~185~~	185	~~190~~	185	360
14	David Litvinov (ISR)	B	119.91	156	~~161~~	161	161	195	~~200~~	~~200~~	195	356
15	Javier Patricio Pagliery (USA)	B	128.36	~~145~~	145	150	150	185	195	~~202~~	195	345
16	David James Jorge (USA)	B	125.30	145	152	~~157~~	152	~~180~~	183	~~191~~	183	335
17	Carl Hampus Lithén (SWE)	B	136.93	~~142~~	142	~~146~~	142	182	~~190~~	~~190~~	182	324
18	Kristjan Pikhof (EST)	B	109.40	120	~~126~~	128	128	~~155~~	155	~~160~~	155	283
