= 2021 World Weightlifting Championships – Men's +109 kg =

Weightlifting Championship

The men's +109 kilograms competition at the 2021 World Weightlifting Championships was held on 17 December 2021.

== Schedule ==
Date	Time	Event
17 December 2021	08:00	Group C
17 December 2021	10:00	Group B
17 December 2021	16:00	Group A

== Medalists ==
Event	Gold		Silver		Bronze	
Snatch	Lasha Talakhadze (GEO)	225 kg	Varazdat Lalayan (ARM)	211 kg	Eduard Ziaziulin (BLR)	206 kg
Clean & Jerk	Lasha Talakhadze (GEO)	267 kg	Varazdat Lalayan (ARM)	246 kg	Gor Minasyan (ARM)	243 kg
Total	Lasha Talakhadze (GEO)	492 kg	Varazdat Lalayan (ARM)	457 kg	Gor Minasyan (ARM)	448 kg

== Records ==
Prior to this competition, the existing world records were as follows.

World record	Snatch	Lasha Talakhadze (GEO)	223 kg	Tokyo, Japan	4 August 2021
World record	Clean & Jerk	Lasha Talakhadze (GEO)	265 kg	Tokyo, Japan	4 August 2021
World record	Total	Lasha Talakhadze (GEO)	488 kg	Tokyo, Japan	4 August 2021

== Results ==
Rank	Athlete	Group	Snatch (kg)				Clean & Jerk (kg)				Total
Rank	Athlete	Group	1	2	3	Rank	1	2	3	Rank	Total
1st place, gold medalist(s)	Lasha Talakhadze (GEO)	A	210	218	225 CWR	1st place, gold medalist(s)	247	257	267 CWR	1st place, gold medalist(s)	492 CWR
2nd place, silver medalist(s)	Varazdat Lalayan (ARM)	A	202	207	211	2nd place, silver medalist(s)	~~240~~	242	246	2nd place, silver medalist(s)	457
3rd place, bronze medalist(s)	Gor Minasyan (ARM)	A	205	~~213~~	~~213~~	4	240	243	~~253~~	3rd place, bronze medalist(s)	448
4	Eduard Ziaziulin (BLR)	A	200	206	~~210~~	3rd place, bronze medalist(s)	231	237	241	4	447
5	Aleksey Lovchev (RWF)	A	190	196	201	5	231	~~237~~	~~238~~	7	432
6	Ayat Sharifi (IRI)	A	185	192	197	6	227	~~242~~	~~244~~	10	424
7	Alireza Yousefi (IRI)	A	173	178	183	7	230	238 JWR	~~245~~	5	421
8	Ahmed Gaber (EGY)	A	175	180	~~185~~	10	226	230	~~234~~	8	410
9	David Liti (NZL)	B	172	176	~~180~~	12	223	227	231	6	407
10	Enzo Kuworge (NED)	B	170	~~175~~	176	13	222	227	~~238~~	9	403
11	Keiser Witte (USA)	B	~~178~~	178	182	8	215	220	~~225~~	14	402
12	Mart Seim (EST)	A	175	~~180~~	~~180~~	15	225	~~233~~	~~236~~	12	400
13	Kosuke Chinen (JPN)	B	~~175~~	175	181	9	210	217	~~222~~	18	398
14	Lee Yang-jae (KOR)	B	~~173~~	173	~~178~~	16	223	~~230~~	~~232~~	13	396
15	Bakari Turmanidze (GEO)	B	171	~~175~~	176	14	210	218	~~223~~	15	394
16	Péter Nagy (HUN)	B	172	~~177~~	—	17	212	218	~~222~~	16	390
17	Nooh Dastgir Butt (PAK)	B	~~165~~	165	~~170~~	21	220	225	—	11	390
18	Gurdeep Singh (IND)	B	160	167	172	18	210	217	~~223~~	17	389
19	Gilberto Lemus (GUA)	C	~~170~~	~~170~~	170	20	200	~~208~~	~~208~~	20	370
20	Mirkhosil Mirzabaev (UZB)	C	164	~~168~~	170	19	193	200	~~205~~	21	370
21	Dixon Arroyo (ECU)	C	170	177	~~182~~	11	~~192~~	~~192~~	192	23	369
22	Miklos Bencsik (CAN)	C	146	151	155	23	193	197	205	19	360
23	Quinn Everett (CAN)	C	153	~~158~~	158	22	~~193~~	193	~~200~~	22	351
24	Rungsuriya Panya (THA)	C	147	152	~~156~~	24	~~190~~	190	~~194~~	24	342
25	Ushan Charuka (SRI)	C	~~135~~	135	~~141~~	25	170	175	180	25	315
26	Godfrey Baligeya (UGA)	C	~~110~~	~~110~~	110	26	140	145	~~150~~	26	255
—	Hojamuhammet Toýçyýew (TKM)	A	~~180~~	~~180~~	~~180~~	—	—	—	—	—	—
—	Oleh Hanzenko (UKR)	B	~~175~~	~~175~~	~~175~~	—	—	—	—	—	—
—	Kamil Kučera (CZE)	B	~~172~~	~~172~~	~~172~~	—	~~223~~	~~223~~	~~223~~	—	—

== New records ==
Snatch	225 kg	Lasha Talakhadze (GEO)	WR
Clean & Jerk	267 kg	Lasha Talakhadze (GEO)	WR
Total	492 kg	Lasha Talakhadze (GEO)	WR
