= 2024 World Weightlifting Championships – Men's +109 kg =

Men's +109 kg at the 2024 World Weightlifting Championships
- Venue: Weightlifting Marquee Venue
- Location: Manama, Bahrain
- Dates: 15 December
- Competitors: 19 from 15 nations
- Winning total: 467 kg

Medalists
gold medal	Varazdat Lalayan	Armenia
silver medal	Ali Davoudi	Iran
bronze medal	Alireza Yousefi	Iran

The men's +109 kilograms competition at the 2024 World Weightlifting Championships was held on 15 December 2024.

== Schedule ==
Date	Time	Event
15 December 2024	13:00	Group B
15 December 2024	17:30	Group A

== Records ==
Prior to this competition, the existing world records were as follows.

World record	Snatch	Lasha Talakhadze (GEO)	225 kg	Tashkent, Uzbekistan	17 December 2021
World record	Clean & Jerk	Lasha Talakhadze (GEO)	267 kg	Tashkent, Uzbekistan	17 December 2021
World record	Total	Lasha Talakhadze (GEO)	492 kg	Tashkent, Uzbekistan	17 December 2021

== Results ==
Rank	Athlete	Group	Snatch (kg)				Clean & Jerk (kg)				Total
Rank	Athlete	Group	1	2	3	Rank	1	2	3	Rank	Total
1st place, gold medalist(s)	Varazdat Lalayan (ARM)	A	206	211	215	1st place, gold medalist(s)	245	~~252~~	252	3rd place, bronze medalist(s)	467
2nd place, silver medalist(s)	Ali Davoudi (IRI)	A	200	206	~~210~~	3rd place, bronze medalist(s)	~~250~~	~~250~~	253	2nd place, silver medalist(s)	459
3rd place, bronze medalist(s)	Alireza Yousefi (IRI)	A	184	~~191~~	194	5	248	258	262; CAR	1st place, gold medalist(s)	456
4	Gor Minasyan (BHR)	A	205	210	~~215~~	2nd place, silver medalist(s)	~~245~~	~~245~~	245	5	455
5	Ali Rubaiawi (IRQ)	A	201; WJR	204; CWJR	~~207~~	4	~~234~~	237	247; CWJR	4	451; CWJR
6	David Liti (NZL)	A	~~180~~	180	~~190~~	7	226	231	~~236~~	6	411
7	Aaron Williams (USA)	A	172	~~177~~	180	8	221	~~231~~	~~231~~	7	401
8	Bakari Turmanidze (GEO)	A	180	185	~~190~~	6	212	~~220~~	~~222~~	11	397
9	Rafael Cerro (COL)	A	~~180~~	~~180~~	180	9	210	~~220~~	~~236~~	14	390
10	Vladyslav Prylypko (UKR)	B	162	167	~~170~~	13	208	213	215	8	382
11	Moayad Al-Najjar (UAE)	B	~~168~~	168	~~175~~	12	213	~~216~~	~~216~~	9	381
12	Caine Wilkes (USA)	B	168	~~174~~	~~175~~	11	205	~~211~~	213	10	381
13	Oleh Hanzenko (UKR)	B	~~167~~	167	170	10	~~208~~	~~208~~	210	13	380
14	Karolis Stonkus (LTU)	B	150	~~156~~	156	14	205	210	~~215~~	12	366
15	Rungsuriya Panya (THA)	B	152	156	~~160~~	13	~~205~~	~~206~~	206	15	362
16	Alonso Bizama (CHI)	B	150	155	~~161~~	16	195	~~202~~	~~202~~	16	350
17	Križan Rajič (CRO)	B	140	~~145~~	145	17	160	~~167~~	167	17	312
—	Atajan Daýyýew (TKM)	B	155	~~160~~	~~160~~	15	~~205~~	~~205~~	~~205~~	—	—
—	Josué Medina (MEX)	B	—	—	—	—	—	—	—	—	—
