= Weightlifting at the 2018 Summer Youth Olympics – Boys' +85 kg =

Boys' +85 kg at the III Summer Youth Olympic Games
- Venue: Parque Polideportivo Roca
- Dates: October 13
- Competitors: 7 from 7 nations

Medalists
1st place, gold medalist(s)		Alireza Yousefi	Iran
2nd place, silver medalist(s)		Hristo Hristov	Bulgaria
3rd place, bronze medalist(s)		Enzo Kuworge	Netherlands

These are the results for the boys' +85 kg event at the 2018 Summer Youth Olympics.

== Results ==
Rank	Name	Nation	Body Weight	Snatch (kg)				Clean & Jerk (kg)				Total (kg)
Rank	Name	Nation	Body Weight	1	2	3	Res	1	2	3	Res	Total (kg)
1st place, gold medalist(s)	Alireza Yousefi	Iran		150	156	162	162	202	211	218	218	380
2nd place, silver medalist(s)	Hristo Hristov	Bulgaria		165	170	173	173	196	202	206	206	379
3rd place, bronze medalist(s)	Enzo Kuworge	Netherlands		155	159	162	162	195	203	~~210~~	203	365
4	Carlos Emilio Escudero Nájera	Ecuador		140	145	150	150	170	~~175~~	175	175	325
5	Jakub Jerzy Zieliński	Poland		135	140	~~145~~	140	168	173	~~178~~	173	313
6	Farid Saadi	Algeria		132	138	~~143~~	138	161	170	~~173~~	170	308
7	Delvin Rocco Baez Moyeno	Puerto Rico		~~110~~	~~110~~	110	110	135	~~140~~	~~140~~	135	245
