= Weightlifting at the 2022 Asian Games – Men's +109 kg =

Men's +109 kg at the 2022 Asian Games
- Venue: Xiaoshan Sports Center Gymnasium
- Date: 7 October 2023
- Competitors: 9 from 8 nations

Medalists
| gold medal | Gor Minasyan | Bahrain |
| silver medal | Ali Davoudi | Iran |
| bronze medal | Rustam Djangabaev | Uzbekistan |

The men's +109 kilograms competition at the 2022 Asian Games took place on 7 October 2023 at Xiaoshan Sports Center Gymnasium.

== Schedule ==
All times are China Standard Time (UTC+08:00)

| Date | Time | Event |
|---|---|---|
| Saturday, 7 October 2023 | 19:00 | Group A |

== Records ==
Prior to this competition, the existing world, Asian and Games records were as follows.

| World Record | Snatch | Lasha Talakhadze (GEO) | 225 kg | Tashkent, Uzbekistan | 17 December 2021 |
| World Record | Clean & Jerk | Lasha Talakhadze (GEO) | 267 kg | Tashkent, Uzbekistan | 17 December 2021 |
| World Record | Total | Lasha Talakhadze (GEO) | 492 kg | Tashkent, Uzbekistan | 17 December 2021 |
| Asian Record | Snatch | Gor Minasyan (BRN) | 217 kg | Jinju, South Korea | 13 May 2023 |
| Asian Record | Clean & Jerk | Gor Minasyan (BRN) | 250 kg | Bogotá, Colombia | 16 December 2022 |
| Asian Record | Total | Gor Minasyan (BRN) | 464 kg | Jinju, South Korea | 13 May 2023 |
| Games Record | Snatch | Asian Games Standard | 199 kg | — | 1 November 2018 |
| Games Record | Clean & Jerk | Asian Games Standard | 243 kg | — | 1 November 2018 |
| Games Record | Total | Asian Games Standard | 441 kg | — | 1 November 2018 |

== Results ==
Legend

- NM — No mark

| Rank | Athlete | Group | Snatch (kg) | | | | Clean & Jerk (kg) | | | | Total |
| Rank | Athlete | Group | 1 | 2 | 3 | Result | 1 | 2 | 3 | Result | Total |
|---|---|---|---|---|---|---|---|---|---|---|---|
| 1st place, gold medalist(s) | Gor Minasyan (BRN) | A | 205 | 212 | — | 212 | 235 | 245 | — | 245 | 457 |
| 2nd place, silver medalist(s) | Ali Davoudi (IRI) | A | 192 | ~~200~~ | ~~200~~ | 192 | 234 | ~~246~~ | — | 234 | 426 |
| 3rd place, bronze medalist(s) | Rustam Djangabaev (UZB) | A | 185 | ~~190~~ | 190 | 190 | 226 | 233 | — | 233 | 423 |
| 4 | Lee Jae-sang (KOR) | A | 170 | 177 | ~~182~~ | 177 | ~~220~~ | 223 | — | 223 | 400 |
| 5 | Hojamuhammet Toýçyýew (TKM) | A | 170 | 177 | ~~182~~ | 177 | 215 | 222 | ~~225~~ | 222 | 399 |
| 6 | Muhammad Abdullah Butt (PAK) | A | ~~145~~ | 145 | ~~152~~ | 145 | ~~190~~ | 190 | ~~200~~ | 190 | 335 |
| 7 | Sagar Bhandari (NEP) | A | 125 | ~~133~~ | 133 | 133 | 161 | 170 | ~~175~~ | 170 | 303 |
| 8 | Ibragim Bersanov (KAZ) | A | 130 | — | — | 130 | 150 | — | — | 150 | 280 |
| — | Ayat Sharifi (IRI) | A | 185 | ~~193~~ | ~~193~~ | 185 | — | — | — | — | NM |

== New records ==
The following records were established during the competition.

| Snatch | 205 | Gor Minasyan (BRN) | GR |
| Snatch | 212 | Gor Minasyan (BRN) | GR |
| Clean & Jerk | 245 | Gor Minasyan (BRN) | GR |
| Total | 447 | Gor Minasyan (BRN) | GR |
| Total | 457 | Gor Minasyan (BRN) | GR |
