= Armenia at the 2024 Summer Olympics =

- IOC code: ARM
- NOC: National Olympic Committee of Armenia
- Website: www.armnoc.am (in Armenian)

in Paris, France 26 July 2024 – 11 August 2024
- Competitors: 15 (13 men and 2 women) in 7 sports
- Flag bearers (opening): Davit Chaloyan & Varsenik Manucharyan
- Flag bearer (closing): Artur Aleksanyan
- Medals Ranked 66th: Gold 0 Silver 3 Bronze 1 Total 4

Summer Olympics appearances (overview)
- 1996; 2000; 2004; 2008; 2012; 2016; 2020; 2024

Other related appearances
- Russian Empire (1900–1912); Soviet Union (1952–1988); Unified Team (1992)

Armenia competed at the 2024 Summer Olympics in Paris from 26 July to 11 August 2024. It was the nation's eighth consecutive appearance at the Summer Olympics in the post-Soviet era.

== Medalists ==
Medal	Name	Sport	Event	Date
Silver	Artur Davtyan	Gymnastics	Men's vault	4 August
Silver	Artur Aleksanyan	Wrestling	Men's Greco-Roman 97 kg	7 August
Silver	Varazdat Lalayan	Weightlifting	Men's +102 kg	11 August
Bronze	Malkhas Amoyan	Wrestling	Men's Greco-Roman 77 kg	7 August

== Competitors ==
The following is the list of number of competitors in the Games.

Sport	Men	Women	Total
Athletics	1	0	1
Boxing	1	0	1
Gymnastics	2	0	2
Shooting	0	1	1
Swimming	1	1	2
Weightlifting	3	0	3
Wrestling	5	0	5
Total	13	2	15

== Athletics ==
Armenia sent one runner to compete at the 2024 Summer Olympics.

Key

- Note–Ranks given for track events are within the athlete's heat only
- Q = Qualified for the next round
- q = Qualified for the next round as a fastest loser or, in field events, by position without achieving the qualifying target
- NR = National record
- N/A = Round not applicable for the event
- Bye = Athlete not required to compete in round

Track and events

Athlete	Event	Preliminary		Heat		Repechage		Semifinal		Final	
Athlete	Event	Time	Rank	Time	Rank	Time	Rank	Time	Rank	Time	Rank
Yervand Mkrtchyan	Men's 800 m	—		1:49.91 NR	9	1:50.07	8	Did not advance			

== Boxing ==
Armenia entered one boxer into the Olympic tournament. Davit Chaloyan (men's super heavyweight) secured his spot following the triumph in quota bouts round, at the 2024 World Olympic Qualification Tournament 2 in Bangkok, Thailand.

Athlete	Event	Round of 32	Round of 16	Quarterfinals	Semifinals	Final	
Athlete	Event	Opposition Result	Opposition Result	Opposition Result	Opposition Result	Opposition Result	Rank
Davit Chaloyan	Men's +92 kg	—	Orie (GBR) W 3–2	Ghadfa (ESP) L 0–5	Did not advance		

== Gymnastics ==
=== Artistic ===
Armenia qualified two gymnasts. Artur Davtyan qualified for the games by being among the highest-ranked eligible athletes in the all-around at the 2023 World Artistic Gymnastics Championships; meanwhile Vahagn Davtyan qualified for the games by being one of the top two athletes ranked on rings through the accumulations of the 2024 Apparatus World Cup series.

Men

Athlete	Event	Qualification								Final							
Athlete	Event	Apparatus						Total	Rank	Apparatus						Total	Rank
Athlete	Event	F	PH	R	V	PB	HB	Total	Rank	F	PH	R	V	PB	HB	Total	Rank
Artur Davtyan	Men's Vault	—			14.666	—		14.666	7 Q	—			14.966	—		14.966	2nd place, silver medalist(s)
Vahagn Davtyan	Men's rings	—		14.733	—			14.733	7 Q	—		14.866	—			14.866	6

== Shooting ==
Armenian shooters achieved quota places for the following events based on their results at the 2022 and 2023 ISSF World Championships, 2022, 2023, and 2024 European Championships, 2023 European Games, and 2024 ISSF World Olympic Qualification Tournament.

Athlete	Event	Qualification		Final	
Athlete	Event	Points	Rank	Points	Rank
Elmira Karapetyan	Women's 10 m air pistol	576	9	Did not advance	

== Swimming ==
Armenia sent two swimmers to compete at the 2024 Paris Olympics.

Athlete	Event	Heat		Semifinal		Final	
Athlete	Event	Time	Rank	Time	Rank	Time	Rank
Artur Barseghyan	Men's 100 m freestyle	51:54	56	Did not advance			
Varsenik Manucharyan	Women's 100 m butterfly	1:01:24	26	Did not advance			

== Weightlifting ==
Armenia entered three weightlifters into the Olympic competition. Andranik Karapetyan (men's 89 kg), Garik Karapetyan (men's 102 kg) and Varazdat Lalayan (men's +102 kg) secured one of the top ten slots in their respective weight divisions based on the IWF Olympic Qualification Rankings.

Athlete	Event	Snatch		Clean & Jerk		Total	Rank
Athlete	Event	Result	Rank	Result	Rank	Total	Rank
Andranik Karapetyan	Men's −89 kg	170	5	200	7	370	7
Garik Karapetyan	Men's −102 kg	186	2	212	5	398	4
Varazdat Lalayan	Men's +102 kg	215	3	252	2	467	2nd place, silver medalist(s)

== Wrestling ==
Armenia qualified five wrestlers for each of the following classes into the Olympic competition. All of them qualified for the games by virtue of top five results through the 2023 World Championships in Belgrade, Serbia.

Key:

- VT (ranking points: 5–0 or 0–5) – Victory by fall.
- VB (ranking points: 5–0 or 0–5) – Victory by injury (VF for forfeit, VA for withdrawal or disqualification)
- PP (ranking points: 3–1 or 1–3) – Decision by points – the loser with technical points.
- PO (ranking points: 3–0 or 0–3) – Decision by points – the loser without technical points.
- ST (ranking points: 4–0 or 0–4) – Great superiority – the loser without technical points and a margin of victory of at least 8 (Greco-Roman) or 10 (freestyle) points.
- SP (ranking points: 4–1 or 1–4) – Technical superiority – the loser with technical points and a margin of victory of at least 8 (Greco-Roman) or 10 (freestyle) points.

Freestyle

Athlete	Event	Round of 16	Quarterfinal	Semifinal	Repechage	Final / BM	
Athlete	Event	Opposition Result	Opposition Result	Opposition Result	Opposition Result	Opposition Result	Rank
Arsen Harutyunyan	Men's −57 kg	Bravo-Young (MEX); W 13–3 ^{SP}	Abdullaev (UZB); L 5–12 ^{PP}	Did not advance			7
Vazgen Tevanyan	Men's −65 kg	Dzebisashvili (GEO); W 11–0 ^{SP}	Tömör-Ochiryn (MGL); L 5–7	Did not advance			7

Greco-Roman

Athlete	Event	Round of 16	Quarterfinals	Semifinals	Repechage	Final / BM	
Athlete	Event	Opposition Result	Opposition Result	Opposition Result	Opposition Result	Opposition Result	Rank
Slavik Galstyan	Men's −67 kg	Montaño (ECU); W 3–2 ^{PP}	Sylla (FRA); W 3–2 ^{PP}	Esmaeli (IRI); L 4–10 ^{PP}	Bye	Orta (CUB); L 4–10 ^{PP}	5
Malkhas Amoyan	Men's −77 kg	Sarkkinen (FIN); W 8–0 ^{ST}	Kavianinejad (IRI); W 3–0 ^{PO}	Kusaka (JPN); L 1–3 ^{PP}	Bye	Vardanyan (UZB); W 6-5 ^{PP}	3rd place, bronze medalist(s)
Artur Aleksanyan	Men's −97 kg	Kim S-j (KOR); W 9–0 ^{ST}	Assakalov (UZB); W 9–5 ^{PP}	Rosillo (CUB); W 5–3 ^{PP}	Bye	Hadi Saravi (IRI); L 1–4 ^{PP}	2nd place, silver medalist(s)

== See also ==
- Armenia at the 2024 Winter Youth Olympics
