= Ali Davoudi =

Iranian weightlifter (born 1999)

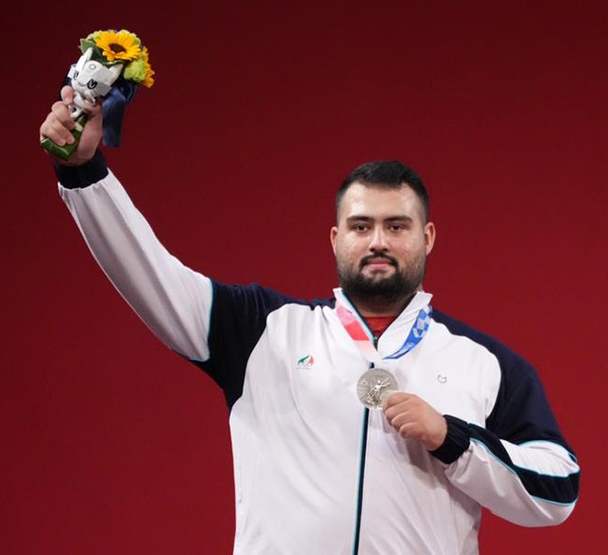
- Davoudi at the 2020 Summer Olympics

Personal information
- Nationality: Iran
- Born: March 22, 1999 (age 27) Tehran, Iran
- Home town: Tehran, Iran
- Height: 198 cm (6 ft 6 in)
- Weight: 168.25 kg (370.9 lb)

Sport
- Country: Iran
- Sport: Weightlifting
- Event: +109 kg
- Coached by: Navab Nassirshalal

Achievements and titles
- Personal bests: Snatch: 206 kg (2024); Clean and jerk: 260 kg (2026); Total: 466 kg (2026)
Medal record
Men's weightlifting
Representing Iran
Olympic Games
Silver medal – second place	2020 Tokyo	+109 kg
World Championships
Silver medal – second place	2024 Manama	+109 kg
Asian Games
Gold medal – first place	2026 Aichi–Nagoya	+110 kg
Silver medal – second place	2022 Hangzhou	+109 kg
Asian Championships
Gold medal – first place	2019 Ningbo	+109 kg
Gold medal – first place	2020 Tashkent	+109 kg
Silver medal – second place	2022 Manama	+109 kg
World Junior Championships
Gold medal – first place	2018 Tashkent	+105 kg
Silver medal – second place	2019 Suva	+109 kg
World Youth Championships
Gold medal – first place	2016 Penang	+94 kg
Asian Youth Championships
Gold medal – first place	2016 Tokyo	+94 kg

Ali Davoudi (Persian: علی داودی; born March 22, 1999, in Tehran) is an Iranian weightlifter.

== Career ==
He won a gold medal at the 2016 Youth World Championships in the +94 kg weight division.

In August 2024, he finished in fourth place in the men's +102 kg event at the 2024 Summer Olympics held in Paris, France.

== Major results ==
Year	Venue	Weight	Snatch (kg)				Clean & Jerk (kg)				Total	Rank
Year	Venue	Weight	1	2	3	Rank	1	2	3	Rank	Total	Rank
Olympic Games
2021	Tokyo, Japan	+109 kg	191	196	200	—N/a	234	~~240~~	241	—N/a	441	2nd place, silver medalist(s)
2024	Paris, France	+102 kg	~~200~~	201	205	—N/a	242	~~257~~	~~257~~	—N/a	447	4
World Championships
2018	Ashgabat, Turkmenistan	+109 kg	185	192	197	6	227	~~242~~	~~245~~	9	424	7
2019	Pattaya, Thailand	+109 kg	190	~~198~~	~~199~~	7	230	~~244~~	~~244~~	11	420	9
2022	Bogotá, Colombia	+109 kg	197	202	~~204~~	4	240	247	~~252~~	4	449	4
2023	Riyadh, Saudi Arabia	+109 kg	~~195~~	195	203	4	240	249	~~255~~	3rd place, bronze medalist(s)	452	4
2024	Manama, Bahrain	+109 kg	200	206	~~210~~	3rd place, bronze medalist(s)	~~250~~	~~250~~	253	2nd place, silver medalist(s)	459	2nd place, silver medalist(s)
2025	Førde, Norway	+110 kg	~~196~~	196	~~202~~	3rd place, bronze medalist(s)	~~243~~	~~244~~	~~246~~	—	—	—
2026	Ningbo, China	+110 kg	200	206	~~210~~	3rd place, bronze medalist(s)	246	~~261~~	~~261~~	4	452	4
IWF World Cup
2024	Phuket, Thailand	+109 kg	195	~~200~~	202	2nd place, silver medalist(s)	240	252	—	2nd place, silver medalist(s)	454	2nd place, silver medalist(s)
Asian Games
2023	Hangzhou, China	+109 kg	192	~~200~~	~~200~~	—N/a	234	~~246~~	—	—N/a	426	2nd place, silver medalist(s)
2026	Nagoya, Japan	+110 kg	197	202	206	—N/a	242	260	~~261~~	—N/a	466	1st place, gold medalist(s)
Asian Championships
2019	Ningbo, China	+109 kg	190	195	~~200~~	1st place, gold medalist(s)	232	237	~~242~~	1st place, gold medalist(s)	432	1st place, gold medalist(s)
2021	Tashkent, Uzbekistan	+109 kg	192	196	~~200~~	1st place, gold medalist(s)	233	239	~~245~~	1st place, gold medalist(s)	435	1st place, gold medalist(s)
2022	Manama, Bahrain	+109 kg	195	~~201~~	~~202~~	2nd place, silver medalist(s)	238	243	~~250~~	1st place, gold medalist(s)	438	2nd place, silver medalist(s)
Junior World Championships
2017	Tokyo, Japan	+105 kg	178	187	~~191~~	2nd place, silver medalist(s)	~~220~~	~~221~~	~~222~~	—	—	—
2018	Tashkent, Uzbekistan	+105 kg	181	187	192	1st place, gold medalist(s)	221	227	~~235~~	2nd place, silver medalist(s)	419	1st place, gold medalist(s)
2019	Suva, Fiji	+109 kg	180	~~191~~	193	1st place, gold medalist(s)	~~225~~	225	~~233~~	3rd place, bronze medalist(s)	418	2nd place, silver medalist(s)
Youth World Championships
2016	Penang, Malaysia	+94 kg	160	165	170	1st place, gold medalist(s)	~~191~~	191	205	1st place, gold medalist(s)	375	1st place, gold medalist(s)
Youth Asian Championships
2016	Tokyo, Japan	+94 kg	155	166	~~171~~	1st place, gold medalist(s)	185	200	~~210~~	1st place, gold medalist(s)	366	1st place, gold medalist(s)
IWF Grand Prix
2023	Havana, Cuba	+109 kg	195	~~203~~	203	1	238	~~251~~	~~252~~	1	441	1st place, gold medalist(s)
Fajr cup
2017	Tehran, Iran	+105 kg	171	~~180~~	~~180~~	1st place, gold medalist(s)	210	220	~~225~~	1st place, gold medalist(s)	391	1st place, gold medalist(s)
2019	Tehran, Iran	+109 kg	190	~~200~~	~~200~~	1st place, gold medalist(s)	231	~~240~~	~~242~~	1st place, gold medalist(s)	421	1st place, gold medalist(s)
2020	Tehran, Iran	+109 kg	193	197	201	1st place, gold medalist(s)	234	240	—	1st place, gold medalist(s)	441	1st place, gold medalist(s)
