= Abdelrahman El-Sayed =

Egyptian weightlifter (born 1989)

- El-Sayed at the 2024 Olympics

Personal information
- Full name: AbdelRahman Mohamed Abdelaziz El-Sayed
- Nationality: Egypt
- Born: 19 May 1989 (age 37)
- Height: 184 cm (6 ft 0 in)
- Weight: 105 kg (231 lb)

Sport
- Sport: Weightlifting
- Event: 105 kg
Medal record
Men's weightlifting
African Championships
Gold medal – first place	2009 Kampala	+105 kg
Gold medal – first place	2022 Cairo	+109 kg
Gold medal – first place	2023 Tunis	+109 kg

Abdelrahman Mohamed El-Sayed (Arabic: عبد الرحمن السيد; born 19 May 1989) is an Egyptian weightlifter.

== Career ==
El-Sayed represented Egypt at the 2008 Summer Olympics in Beijing, where he competed for the men's heavyweight category (105 kg). El-Sayed placed fourteenth in this event, as he successfully lifted 175 kg in the single-motion snatch, and hoisted 210 kg in the two-part, shoulder-to-overhead clean and jerk, for a total of 385 kg. El-Sayed was later elevated to a higher position, when Ukraine's Ihor Razoronov had been disqualified from the Olympics, after he tested positive for nandrolone.

In August 2024, he finished in seventh place in the men's +102 kg event at the 2024 Summer Olympics held in Paris, France.

== Major results ==
Year	Venue	Weight	Snatch (kg)				Clean & Jerk (kg)				Total	Rank
Year	Venue	Weight	1	2	3	Rank	1	2	3	Rank	Total	Rank
Summer Olympics
2008	Beijing, China	105 kg	172	175	~~178~~	—N/a	210	~~216~~	~~216~~	—N/a	385	12
2024	Paris, France	+102 kg	178	183	~~190~~	—N/a	225	~~233~~	233	—N/a	416	7
World Championships
2007	Chiang Mai, Thailand	105 kg	~~165~~	165	170	19	205	~~207~~	~~207~~	17	375	16
2009	Goyang, South Korea	+105 kg	180	185	~~187~~	5	~~225~~	225	230	4	415	4
2011	Paris, France	+105 kg	185	190	~~192~~	9	217	~~225~~	~~226~~	15	407	11
2022	Bogotá, Colombia	+109 kg	185	~~191~~	191	8	236	242	~~247~~	6	433	6
2023	Riyadh, Saudi Arabia	+109 kg	~~180~~	~~185~~	~~185~~	—	—	—	—	—	—	—
African Games
2019	Rabat, Morocco	+109 kg	165	—	—	—	196	—	—	—	DSQ	—
African Championships
2009	Kampala, Uganda	+105 kg	160			1st place, gold medalist(s)	205			1st place, gold medalist(s)	365	1st place, gold medalist(s)
2022	Cairo, Egypt	+109 kg	180	187	190	1st place, gold medalist(s)	230	236	~~248~~	1st place, gold medalist(s)	426	1st place, gold medalist(s)
2023	Tunis, Tunisia	+109 kg	175	185	~~193~~	2nd place, silver medalist(s)	226	243	~~245~~	1st place, gold medalist(s)	428	1st place, gold medalist(s)
2024	Ismailia, Egypt	+109 kg	~~157~~	~~157~~	—	—	—	—	—	—	—	—
Pan Arab Games
2011	Doha, Qatar	+105 kg	150	~~190~~	~~190~~	1st place, gold medalist(s)	200	220	—	1st place, gold medalist(s)	370	1st place, gold medalist(s)
