= Enzo Kuworge =

Dutch weightlifter (born 2001)

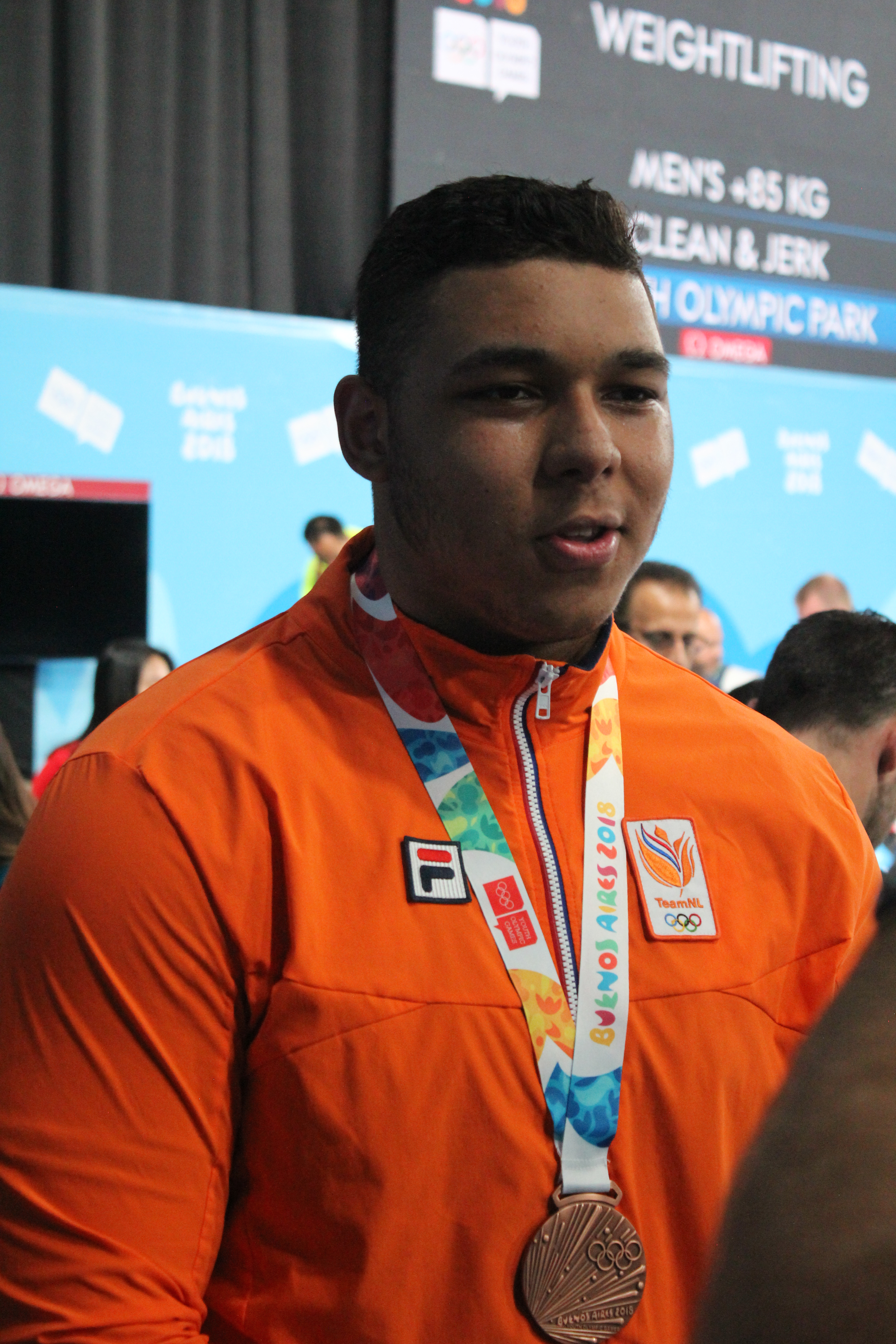
- Enzo Kuworge at the 2018 Summer Youth Olympics

Personal information
- Full name: Enzo Kofi Kuworge
- Born: 31 August 2001 (age 24) Nijmegen, The Netherlands
- Years active: 2009 – present
- Height: 1.98 m (6 ft 6 in)
- Weight: 150 kg (331 lb)

Sport
- Country: Netherlands
- Sport: Weightlifting
- Weight class: +109 kg (Super heavyweight)
- Coached by: Pierre Verkroost
Medal record
Men's weightlifting
Representing Netherlands
Junior World Championships
Gold medal – first place	2021 Tashkent	+109 kg
Summer Youth Olympics
Bronze medal – third place	2018 Buenos Aires	+85 kg
European Youth Championships
Silver medal – second place	2017 Pristina	+94 kg
Silver medal – second place	2018 San Donato Milanese	+94 kg

Enzo Kofi Kuworge (born 31 August 2001) is a Dutch weightlifter. He became junior super heavyweight world champion at the 2021 Junior World Weightlifting Championships held in Tashkent, Uzbekistan. He represented the Netherlands at the 2020 Summer Olympics in Tokyo, Japan.

In 2018, he won the bronze medal in the boys' +85 kg event at the Summer Youth Olympics held in Buenos Aires, Argentina.

== Career ==
At the 2017 European Youth Weightlifting Championships held in Pristina, Kosovo, he won the bronze medal in the clean & jerk and the silver medal in total in the men's +94 kg. He repeated this in 2018 at the European Youth Weightlifting Championships held in San Donato Milanese, Italy but added a gold medal in the clean & jerk and a silver medal in the snatch. A few months later, he competed at the 2018 Summer Youth Olympics held in Buenos Aires, Argentina where he broke all national senior records and won the bronze medal.

In 2019, at the British International Open held in Coventry, Great Britain, he won the bronze medal in the men's +109 kg event. A few months later, he competed in the men's +109 kg event at the 2019 World Weightlifting Championships held in Pattaya, Thailand without winning a medal. At the 2019 European Junior & U23 Weightlifting Championships held in Bucharest, Romania, he won the silver medal in the men's junior +109 kg event.

In 2020, he finished in 6th place in the men's +109 kg event at the Roma 2020 World Cup in Rome, Italy.

In April 2021, Kuworge finished in 11th place in the men's +109 kg event at the European Weightlifting Championships held in Moscow, Russia. In May 2021, he won the gold medal in his event at the Junior World Weightlifting Championships held in Tashkent, Uzbekistan.

Kuworge competed in the men's +109 kg event at the 2020 Summer Olympics in Tokyo, Japan. It was the first time a weightlifter from the Netherlands competed at the Summer Olympics in over fifty years. (Note: Pieter van der Kruk competed in the men's +90 kg event at the 1968 Summer Olympics in Mexico City, Mexico.) He finished in 6th place with a lift of 175 kg in the Snatch, 234 kg in the Clean & Jerk and 409 kg in total. A few months later, he won the gold medal in the men's junior +109 kg event at the 2021 European Junior & U23 Weightlifting Championships held in Rovaniemi, Finland. In December 2021, he competed in the men's +109 kg event at the World Weightlifting Championships held in Tashkent, Uzbekistan. He finished in 10th place. In that same month, he won the Young Talent Award 2020/2021 at the NOC*NSF Sports Gala.

Kuworge competed in the men's +109 kg event at the 2022 European Weightlifting Championships held in Tirana, Albania.

== Personal life ==
He has a Ghanaian father and a Dutch mother.

== Achievements ==
Year	Venue	Weight	Snatch (kg)				Clean & Jerk (kg)				Total	Rank
Year	Venue	Weight	1	2	3	Rank	1	2	3	Rank	Total	Rank
Summer Olympics
2021	Tokyo, Japan	+109 kg	175	~~180~~	~~180~~	—N/a	225	~~233~~	234	—N/a	409	6
World Championships
2019	Pattaya, Thailand	+109 kg	161	166	~~170~~	24	~~213~~	~~213~~	215	19	381	20
2021	Tashkent, Uzbekistan	+109 kg	170	~~175~~	176	13	222	227	~~238~~	9	403	10
2022	Bogotá, Colombia	+109 kg	—	—	—	—	—	—	—	—	—	—
2023	Riyadh, Saudi Arabia	+109 kg	—	—	—	—	—	—	—	—	—	—
European Championships
2021	Moscow, Russia	+109 kg	172	176	~~180~~	10	~~222~~	~~222~~	222	9	398	11
2022	Tirana, Albania	+109 kg	178	~~181~~	183	6	~~230~~	~~230~~	~~230~~	—	—	—
2023	Yerevan, Armenia	+109 kg	—	—	—	—	—	—	—	—	—	—
2024	Sofia, Bulgaria	+109 kg	160	165	168	9	202	—	—	10	370	9
