= 2025 World Weightlifting Championships – Men's +110 kg =

Men's +110 kg at the 2025 World Weightlifting Championships
- Venue: Førdehuset
- Location: Førde, Norway
- Dates: 10 and 11 October
- Winning total: 461 kg

Medalists
gold medal	Varazdat Lalayan	Armenia
silver medal	Gor Minasyan	Bahrain
bronze medal	Song Yeong-hwan	South Korea

The men's +110 kilograms competition at the 2025 World Weightlifting Championships was held on 10 and 11 October 2025.

== Schedule ==
Date	Time	Event
10 October 2025	17:00	Group B
11 October 2025	16:00	Group A

== Records ==
Prior to this competition, the existing world records were as follows.

World record	Snatch	World Standard	218 kg	—	1 June 2025
World record	Clean & Jerk	World Standard	260 kg	—	1 June 2025
World record	Total	World Standard	477 kg	—	1 June 2025

== Results ==
Rank	Athlete	Group	Snatch (kg)				Clean & Jerk (kg)				Total
Rank	Athlete	Group	1	2	3	Rank	1	2	3	Rank	Total
1st place, gold medalist(s)	Varazdat Lalayan (ARM)	A	206	~~211~~	211	1st place, gold medalist(s)	245	250	~~261~~	1st place, gold medalist(s)	461
2nd place, silver medalist(s)	Gor Minasyan (BHR)	A	~~205~~	205	~~210~~	2nd place, silver medalist(s)	242	~~251~~	—	2nd place, silver medalist(s)	447
3rd place, bronze medalist(s)	Song Yeong-hwan (KOR)	A	175	~~180~~	~~180~~	7	~~235~~	235	~~242~~	3rd place, bronze medalist(s)	410
4	Lee Yang-jae (KOR)	A	175	~~180~~	180	5	220	~~225~~	225	4	405
5	Vladyslav Prylypko (UKR)	B	166	171	~~174~~	8	216	221	~~226~~	5	392
6	Ragnar Holme (NOR)	B	~~173~~	173	178	6	~~210~~	210	~~217~~	7	388
7	Kamil Kučera (CZE)	B	~~165~~	~~166~~	166	12	210	217	~~223~~	6	383
8	Lovepreet Singh (IND)	B	~~168~~	~~168~~	168	10	~~201~~	201	~~209~~	10	369
9	Karolis Stonkus (LTU)	B	156	160	164	13	205	~~210~~	~~210~~	8	369
10	Josef Kolář (CZE)	B	155	160	164	14	190	200	203	9	367
11	Karim Saadi (MEX)	B	158	163	166	11	~~193~~	193	200	12	366
12	Suamili Nanai (AUS)	B	~~160~~	160	~~168~~	15	~~200~~	~~200~~	200	13	360
13	Alonso Bizama (CHI)	B	145	155	~~161~~	16	190	200	~~206~~	11	355
14	Sikoti Manumua (TGA)	B	135	~~140~~	~~140~~	17	166	172	177	14	312
—	Ali Davoudi (IRI)	A	~~196~~	196	~~202~~	3rd place, bronze medalist(s)	~~243~~	~~244~~	~~246~~	—	—
—	Aaron Williams (USA)	A	180	~~185~~	185	4	~~220~~	~~221~~	~~225~~	—	—
—	Moayad Al-Najjar (UAE)	A	170	~~176~~	~~176~~	9	—	—	—	—	—
—	Ayat Sharifi (IRI)	A	~~190~~	~~197~~	—	—	~~244~~	~~244~~	—	—	—
—	Bakari Turmanidze (GEO)	A	—	—	—	—	—	—	—	—	—
—	David Liti (NZL)	A	Did not start								
—	Bilal Bouamr (MAR)	B	Did not start								
