= 2019 World Weightlifting Championships – Men's +109 kg =

The men's +109 kg competition at the 2019 World Weightlifting Championships was held on 27 September 2019.

== Schedule ==
Date	Time	Event
27 September 2019	09:00	Group C
27 September 2019	11:00	Group B
27 September 2019	15:55	Group A

== Medalists ==
Event	Gold		Silver		Bronze	
Snatch	Lasha Talakhadze (GEO)	220 kg	Gor Minasyan (ARM)	212 kg	Walid Bidani (ALG)	200 kg
Clean & Jerk	Lasha Talakhadze (GEO)	264 kg	Gor Minasyan (ARM)	248 kg	Ruben Aleksanyan (ARM)	245 kg
Total	Lasha Talakhadze (GEO)	484 kg	Gor Minasyan (ARM)	460 kg	Ruben Aleksanyan (ARM)	437 kg

== Records ==
Prior to this competition, the existing world records were as follows.

World Record	Snatch	Lasha Talakhadze (GEO)	218 kg	Batumi, Georgia	13 April 2019
World Record	Clean & Jerk	Lasha Talakhadze (GEO)	260 kg	Batumi, Georgia	13 April 2019
World Record	Total	Lasha Talakhadze (GEO)	478 kg	Batumi, Georgia	13 April 2019

== Results ==
Rank	Athlete	Group	Snatch (kg)				Clean & Jerk (kg)				Total
Rank	Athlete	Group	1	2	3	Rank	1	2	3	Rank	Total
1st place, gold medalist(s)	Lasha Talakhadze (GEO)	A	208	215	220 WR	1st place, gold medalist(s)	247	255	264 WR	1st place, gold medalist(s)	484 WR
2nd place, silver medalist(s)	Gor Minasyan (ARM)	A	200	207	212	2nd place, silver medalist(s)	237	243	248	2nd place, silver medalist(s)	460
3rd place, bronze medalist(s)	Ruben Aleksanyan (ARM)	A	~~192~~	~~192~~	192	6	241	245	—	3rd place, bronze medalist(s)	437
4	Eduard Ziaziulin (BLR)	A	193	198	~~201~~	4	225	~~234~~	234	7	432
5	Walid Bidani (ALG)	A	191	~~197~~	200	3rd place, bronze medalist(s)	222	231	~~238~~	9	431
6	Man Asaad (SYR)	B	183	189	~~192~~	8	225	233	241	5	430
7	Fernando Reis (BRA)	A	185	~~191~~	192	5	225	232	~~236~~	8	424
8	Hojamuhammet Toýçyýew (TKM)	A	180	~~187~~	~~189~~	16	235	242	—	4	422
9	Ali Davoudi (IRI)	A	190	~~198~~	~~199~~	7	230	~~244~~	~~244~~	11	420
10	Jiří Orság (CZE)	B	~~176~~	176	~~180~~	18	230	240	~~250~~	6	416
11	Eishiro Murakami (JPN)	B	180	~~185~~	185	11	217	224	230	10	415
12	Giorgi Chkheidze (GEO)	B	178	182	185	10	222	227	~~231~~	14	412
13	Antoniy Savchuk (RUS)	B	~~179~~	179	183	13	217	222	226	15	409
14	Ham Sang-il (KOR)	B	180	~~187~~	~~190~~	15	220	227	~~232~~	13	407
15	Caine Wilkes (USA)	B	175	181	~~187~~	14	215	222	~~227~~	17	403
16	David Liti (NZL)	C	163	168	173	21	216	222	227	12	400
17	Mart Seim (EST)	B	~~175~~	~~175~~	175	20	225	~~230~~	~~230~~	16	400
18	Péter Nagy (HUN)	B	176	~~181~~	~~182~~	17	215	221	~~225~~	18	397
19	David Litvinov (ISR)	C	176	181	184	12	~~205~~	205	211	21	395
20	Enzo Kuworge (NED)	C	161	166	~~170~~	24	~~213~~	~~213~~	215	19	381
21	Raúl Manríquez (MEX)	C	165	171	~~176~~	22	205	~~215~~	~~215~~	22	376
22	Anthony Coullet (FRA)	C	158	163	~~166~~	25	212	~~219~~	~~222~~	20	375
23	Kim Tollefsen (NOR)	C	157	162	~~164~~	26	200	205	~~208~~	23	367
24	Gilberto Lemus (GUA)	C	165	171	~~176~~	23	195	~~205~~	~~206~~	24	366
—	Mohsen Dadras (IRI)	A	181	186	~~190~~	9	~~225~~	~~225~~	~~230~~	—	—
—	Fernando Salas (ECU)	C	163	170	175	19	~~193~~	—	—	—	—
—	Kamil Kučera (CZE)	B	~~176~~	~~176~~	~~176~~	—	~~225~~	—	—	—	—
DQ	Chen Shih-chieh (TPE)	A	185	190	~~193~~	—	235	~~242~~	~~242~~	—	—

== New records ==
Snatch	220 kg	Lasha Talakhadze (GEO)	WR
Clean & Jerk	264 kg	Lasha Talakhadze (GEO)	WR
Total	484 kg	Lasha Talakhadze (GEO)	WR
