= Weightlifting at the 2026 Asian Games – Men's +110 kg =

Men's +110 kg at the 2026 Asian Games
- Venue: Nagoya Trade & Industry Center
- Date: 29 September 2026
- Competitors: 5 from 5 nations

Medalists
gold medal	Ali Davoudi	Iran
silver medal	Ali Ammar	Iraq
bronze medal	Gor Minasyan	Bahrain

The men's +110 kilograms competition at the 2026 Asian Games was held on 29 September 2026 at the Nagoya Trade & Industry Center.

== Schedule ==
All times are Japan Standard Time (UTC+09:00)

Date	Time	Event
Tuesday, 29 September 2026	19:10	Group A

== Records ==
Prior to this competition, the existing world, Asian and Games records were as follows.

World Record	Snatch	World Standard	218 kg	—	1 June 2025
World Record	Clean & Jerk	Alireza Yousefi (IRI)	261 kg	Gandhinagar, India	17 May 2026
World Record	Total	World Standard	477 kg	—	1 June 2025
Asian Record	Snatch	Gor Minasyan (BRN)	213 kg	Riyadh, Saudi Arabia	12 November 2025
Asian Record	Clean & Jerk	Alireza Yousefi (IRI)	261 kg	Gandhinagar, India	17 May 2026
Asian Record	Total	Gor Minasyan (BRN)	460 kg	Riyadh, Saudi Arabia	12 November 2025
Games Record	Snatch	Asian Games Standard	207 kg	—	1 August 2026
Games Record	Clean & Jerk	Asian Games Standard	240 kg	—	1 August 2026
Games Record	Total	Asian Games Standard	447 kg	—	1 August 2026

== Results ==
Rank	Athlete	Group	Snatch (kg)				Clean & Jerk (kg)				Total
Rank	Athlete	Group	1	2	3	Result	1	2	3	Result	Total
1st place, gold medalist(s)	Ali Davoudi (IRI)	A	197	202	206	206	242	260	~~261~~	260	466
2nd place, silver medalist(s)	Ali Ammar (IRQ)	A	210	215	219	219	240	246	~~252~~	246	465
3rd place, bronze medalist(s)	Gor Minasyan (BRN)	A	205	~~211~~	~~211~~	205	~~235~~	235	~~246~~	235	440
4	Song Yeong-hwan (KOR)	A	171	180	~~183~~	180	~~234~~	234	—	234	414
5	Dong Bing-cheng (TPE)	A	170	180	183	183	~~210~~	210	230	230	413

== New records ==
The following records were established during the competition.

Snatch	210	Ali Ammar (IRQ)	GR
Snatch	215	Ali Ammar (IRQ)	AR
Snatch	219	Ali Ammar (IRQ)	WR
Clean & Jerk	242	Ali Davoudi (IRI)	GR
Clean & Jerk	246	Ali Ammar (IRQ)	GR
Clean & Jerk	260	Ali Davoudi (IRI)	GR
Total	459	Ali Ammar (IRQ)	GR
Total	465	Ali Ammar (IRQ)	AR
Total	466	Ali Davoudi (IRI)	AR
