= Weightlifting at the 2024 Summer Olympics – Men's +102 kg =

Men's +102 kg at the Games of the XXXIII Olympiad
- Venue: Paris Expo Porte de Versailles
- Date: 10 August 2024
- Competitors: 12 from 12 nations
- Winning total: 470 kg

Medalists
1st place, gold medalist(s)		Lasha Talakhadze	Georgia
2nd place, silver medalist(s)		Varazdat Lalayan	Armenia
3rd place, bronze medalist(s)		Gor Minasyan	Bahrain

The men's +102 kg weightlifting competition at the 2024 Summer Olympics was held on 10 August at the Paris Expo Porte de Versailles.

Going into the competition, two-time Olympic champion Lasha Talakhadze of Georgia was the favourite to win, while 2024 European Champion Varazdat Lalayan of Armenia and 2023 Asian Champion Gor Minasyan of Bahrain were also among the top contenders. In the final, Talakhadze won gold, becoming the fifth weightlifter to win three Olympic gold medals. Lalayan won silver and Minasyan won bronze. Ali Rubaiawi of Iraq placed sixth but set junior world records in the snatch and the total. Placing eighth, David Liti of New Zealand set an Oceanian record in the total.

== Background ==
On 14 June 2022, the International Weightlifting Federation (IWF) officially announced the new weight categories for the 2024 Summer Olympics, with the total medal count reduced from fourteen to ten. The men's +109 kg category of the 2020 Summer Olympics, which was won by Lasha Talakhadze of Georgia, was adjusted as the men's +102 kg category due to the men's 109 kg category being replaced by the men's 102 kg category for these Games.

In the same year, Talakhadze had to lose weight on his doctor's advice due to the detection of a minor heart irregularity, while he also suffered from a leg injury he sustained in training. At the 2022 World Weightlifting Championships, the first eligible event during the qualification timeline, he placed first with a total of 466 kilograms despite his injury. 2016 Summer Olympic silver medalist Gor Minasyan, who changed his sporting nationality from Armenian to Bahraini that year, placed second, while Varazdat Lalayan of Armenia placed third. Talakhadze then competed at the 2023 European Weightlifting Championships, placing first in the event with a total of 474 kilograms for his seventh straight European Championship win.

Minasyan then competed at the 2023 Asian Weightlifting Championships and placed first in the snatch, clean and jerk, and total, the first time he had done so in international competition. He set new Asian records in the snatch with 217 kilograms, the second-heaviest snatch of all time, and a total of 464 kilograms. Alireza Yousefi of Iran also set a new junior world record in the clean and jerk with 246 kilograms. At the 2023 World Weightlifting Championships, Talakhadze placed first in the event with a total of 474 kilograms, 13 kilograms more than second placer Lalayan, while Minasyan placed third. This was Talakhadze's seventh straight world championship title. In the B Group (a session for lower entry weights, held before the A Group), Ali Rubaiawi of Iraq set a junior world record in the snatch with 198 kilograms, becoming the first Iraqi weightlifter to set a junior world record. Two months after the World Championships, Lalayan won his first world level gold medal at the 2023 IWF Grand Prix II with a total of 441 kilograms.

At the 2024 Asian Weightlifting Championships, 2020 Summer Olympic bronze medalist Man Asaad of Syria placed first over Minasyan by 1 kilogram, with a total of 444 kilograms. Asaad was initially 15 kilograms behind in the snatch with 192 kilograms, but lifted 252 kilograms in the clean and jerk to set a new Asian record, and won his first Asian Championship gold medal. Minasyan had only one successful attempt in the clean and jerk with 236 kilograms before failing his two subsequent attempts. The next competition was the 2024 European Weightlifting Championships, where Giorgi Asanidze, Georgia's head coach, decided to withdraw Talakhadze due to a minor trauma dealt on one of his knees. Without Talakhadze, Lalayan placed first in the category with a total of 455 kilograms for his first European Championship win. The 2024 IWF World Cup was the last competition during the qualification period. Among the athletes who decided to be entered in the start list—in order to be eligible to qualify for the 2024 Summer Olympics—but did not lift in the competition were Talakhadze, Minasyan, and Asaad. There, Lalayan placed first with a total of 463 kilograms. 2020 Summer Olympic silver medalist Ali Davoudi of Iran was second, and Ayat Sharifi of Iran placed third.

Sports Illustrated predicted that Talakhadze would win, followed by Minasyan in second, and Lalayan in third.

=== Qualification ===
Qualification for every event had spots for at least twelve weightlifters coming from different National Olympic Committees (NOC). Qualification spots were eligible for the ten highest-ranked weightlifters in the IWF Olympic Qualification Ranking; the highest-ranked weightlifter representing an NOC whose continent lies outside the top ten (IWF Olympic Continental Qualification Ranking); the host nation's reserved entry; and a universality place, which allows an NOC to send athletes despite not meeting the standard qualification criteria. If a spot was still available after all continents had representation in the top ten, the host nation did not send an entry, a universality place was not used, or any combination of the following, the quota place was allocated to the next highest-ranked eligible weightlifter.

To be eligible for the event, all weightlifters must have competed at the 2023 World Weightlifting Championships in Riyadh, 2024 IWF World Cup in Phuket, and in at least three qualifying tournaments. Apart from two compulsory events, the host country France and those eligible for universality places may have competed in a minimum of two qualifying tournaments. For the men's +102 kg category, twelve athletes qualified for the event with the absence of a host entry and a universality slot. Eduard Ziaziulin, competing for the Individual Neutral Athletes, was originally in the top ten but was removed from the ranking after being declared ineligible to compete by the IWF. Kamil Kučera of the Czech Republic and Mart Seim of Estonia were reallocated the spots due to the absence of a weightlifter in the top ten, a host entry, and a universality slot.

Qualified weightlifters
Weightlifter	Country	Total (kg)	Qualification
Lasha Talakhadze	Georgia	474	Ranking
Gor Minasyan	Bahrain	464	Ranking
Varazdat Lalayan	Armenia	463	Ranking
Ali Davoudi	Iran	454	Ranking
Man Asaad	Syria	445	Ranking
Abdelrahman El-Sayed	Egypt	433	Ranking
Ali Rubaiawi	Iraq	427	Ranking
Walid Bidani	Algeria	426	Ranking
Eishiro Murakami	Japan	421	Ranking
David Liti	New Zealand	413	Continental ranking
Kamil Kučera	Czech Republic	411	Reallocation
Mart Seim	Estonia	410	Reallocation

=== Records ===
The world records before the competition were all set by Talakhadze at the 2021 World Weightlifting Championships, with a snatch of 225 kilograms and a clean and jerk of 267 kilograms, for a total of 492 kilograms. With these lifts, Talakhadze would own all of the all-time senior world records in the super-heavyweight category after surpassing his previous world records and the 266 kilogram clean and jerk set by Leonid Taranenko. The Olympic records made before the restructuring of the event were all set by Talakhadze at the previous Summer Games. He lifted a snatch of 223 kilograms and a clean and jerk of 265 kilograms for a total of 488 kilograms, which were also world records before his stint at the 2021 World Weightlifting Championships.

Records before the competition
World Record	Snatch	Lasha Talakhadze (GEO)	225 kg	Tashkent, Uzbekistan	17 December 2021
World Record	Clean & Jerk	Lasha Talakhadze (GEO)	267 kg	Tashkent, Uzbekistan	17 December 2021
World Record	Total	Lasha Talakhadze (GEO)	492 kg	Tashkent, Uzbekistan	17 December 2021
Olympic Record	Snatch	Lasha Talakhadze (GEO)	223 kg	Tokyo, Japan	4 August 2021
Olympic Record	Clean & Jerk	Lasha Talakhadze (GEO)	265 kg	Tokyo, Japan	4 August 2021
Olympic Record	Total	Lasha Talakhadze (GEO)	488 kg	Tokyo, Japan	4 August 2021

== Results ==
The event was held on 10 August, starting at 8:30 p.m., at the Paris Expo Porte de Versailles. Bidani was eliminated during the snatch portion of the event after failing two of his attempts before declining a third one due to a knee injury. Kučera, the oldest weightlifter at the Summer Games, had the lightest snatch of the event at 110 kilograms, owing it to recovery from a laparoscopy done on his abdomen a month before the Summer Games.

Minasyan had the heaviest snatch at 216 kilograms while Lalayan and Talakhadze tied for the second-heaviest with 215 kilograms; Rubaiawi broke the junior world record in the snatch with 200 kilograms. In the clean and jerks, Kučera would also have the lightest lift, lifting 140 kilograms, while Talakhadze lifted 255 kilograms as the heaviest of the event; Minasyan had the third-heaviest of the event at 245 kilograms while Lalayan had the second-heaviest at 252 kilograms, failing his last attempt at 256 kilograms to overtake Talakhadze.

With a total of 470 kilograms, Talakhadze won his third Olympic title, becoming the fifth weightlifter to win three Olympic gold medals after Pyrros Dimas of Greece, Kakhi Kakhiashvili of Georgia and the Unified Team, Halil Mutlu of Turkey, and Naim Süleymanoğlu of Turkey. Lalayan and Minasyan placed second and third, respectively. Although placing sixth, Rubaiawi broke the junior world record in the total with 437 kilograms. Placing eighth, Liti broke the Oceanian record in the total with 415 kilograms.

Rank	Athlete	Nation	Snatch (kg)				Clean & Jerk (kg)				Total
Rank	Athlete	Nation	1	2	3	Result	1	2	3	Result	Total
1st place, gold medalist(s)	Lasha Talakhadze	Georgia	210	215	~~220~~	215	247	255	—	255	470
2nd place, silver medalist(s)	Varazdat Lalayan	Armenia	210	215	~~218~~	215	247	252	~~256~~	252	467
3rd place, bronze medalist(s)	Gor Minasyan	Bahrain	210	216	~~220~~	216	245	~~255~~	~~255~~	245	461
4	Ali Davoudi	Iran	~~200~~	201	205	205	242	~~257~~	~~257~~	242	447
5	Man Asaad	Syria	191	197	~~201~~	197	235	241	~~253~~	241	438
6	Ali Rubaiawi	Iraq	~~195~~	195	200	200 JWR	230	237	~~247~~	237	437 JWR
7	Abdelrahman El-Sayed	Egypt	178	183	~~190~~	183	225	~~233~~	233	233	416
8	David Liti	New Zealand	178	182	184	184	224	231	~~235~~	231	415; OR
9	Mart Seim	Estonia	175	180	~~183~~	180	220	~~237~~	~~237~~	220	400
10	Eishiro Murakami	Japan	170	~~180~~	180	180	200	220	~~230~~	220	400
11	Kamil Kučera	Czech Republic	100	110	—	110	120	140	—	140	250
—	Walid Bidani	Algeria	~~190~~	~~190~~	—	—	—	—	—	—	DNF
