= David Liti =

New Zealand weightlifter (born 1996)

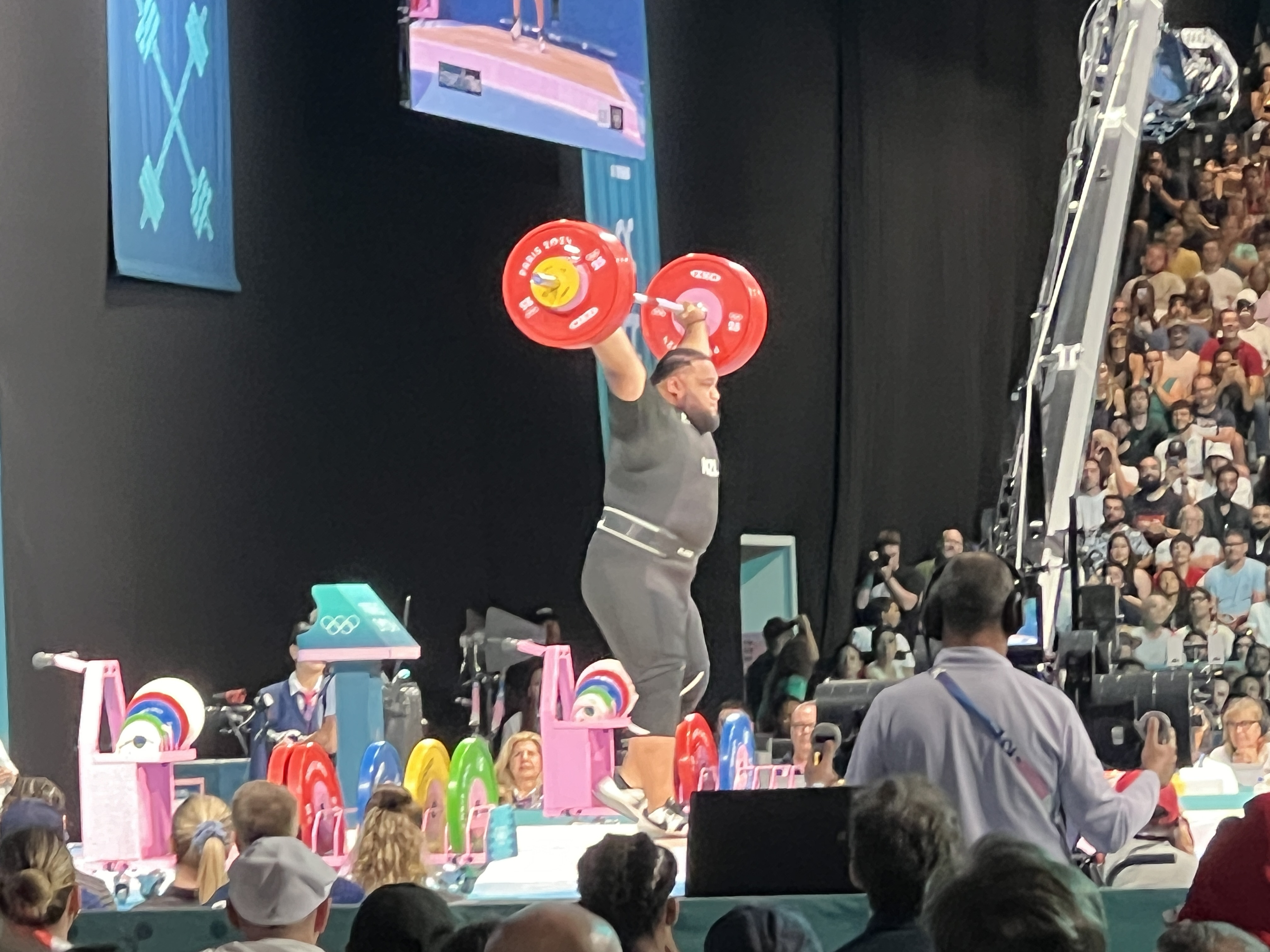
- 2024 Summer Olympics

Personal information
- Full name: David Andrew Liti
- Nickname: Big Bear
- Born: 11 July 1996 (age 30) Auckland, New Zealand
- Home town: Auckland, New Zealand
- Height: 1.82 m (6 ft 0 in) (2018)
- Weight: 185 kg (408 lb) (2018)

Sport
- Coached by: Tina Ball
Medal record
Men's weightlifting
Representing New Zealand
Commonwealth Games
Gold medal – first place	2018 Gold Coast	+105 kg
Gold medal – first place	2026 Glasgow	+110 kg
Silver medal – second place	2022 Birmingham	+109 kg
Commonwealth Championships
Gold medal – first place	2021 Tashkent	+109 kg
Silver medal – second place	2016 Penang	+105 kg
Pacific Games
Gold medal – first place	2023 Honiara	+109 kg
Bronze medal – third place	2015 Port Moresby	+105 kg
Oceania Championships
Gold medal – first place	2018 Le-Mont Dore	+105 kg
Gold medal – first place	2023 Honiara	+109 kg
Gold medal – first place	2024 Auckland	+109 kg
Gold medal – first place	2025 Meyuns	+110 kg
Silver medal – second place	2026 Apia	+110 kg
Bronze medal – third place	2015 Port Moresby	+105 kg

David Andrew Liti (born 11 July 1996) is a New Zealand weightlifter, who won the gold medal in the +105 kg event at the 2018 Commonwealth Games. His total lift of 403 kg was a Commonwealth Games record.

At the Games' closing ceremony, Liti was presented with the David Dixon Award for sportsmanship shown towards his injured weightlifting rival Lauititi Lui.

== Career ==
He represented New Zealand at the 2020 Summer Olympics in Tokyo, Japan, finishing fifth in the men's +109 kg event.

In December 2022, he was elected as member of the IWF Athletes' Commission.

In August 2024, he finished in eighth place in the men's +102 kg event at the 2024 Summer Olympics held in Paris, France.

== Major results ==
Year	Venue	Weight	Snatch (kg)				Clean & Jerk (kg)				Total	Rank
Year	Venue	Weight	1	2	3	Rank	1	2	3	Rank	Total	Rank
Summer Olympics
2021	Tokyo, Japan	+109 kg	173	178	~~183~~	—N/a	229	236	~~241~~	—N/a	414	5
2024	Paris, France	+102 kg	178	182	184	—N/a	224	231	~~235~~	—N/a	415	8
World Championships
2017	Anaheim, United States	+105 kg	160	166	~~171~~	14	218	~~222~~	222	11	388	14
2018	Ashgabat, Turkmenistan	+109 kg	161	165	169	20	220	226	~~231~~	11	395	12
2019	Pattaya, Thailand	+109 kg	163	168	173	21	216	222	227	12	400	16
2021	Tashkent, Uzbekistan	+109 kg	172	176	~~180~~	12	223	227	231	6	407	9
2022	Bogotá, Colombia	+109 kg	167	170	173	18	218	223	—	13	396	16
2023	Riyadh, Saudi Arabia	+109 kg	174	178	181	12	~~224~~	~~224~~	226	8	407	9
2024	Manama, Bahrain	+109 kg	~~180~~	180	~~190~~	7	226	231	~~236~~	6	411	6
2025	Førde, Norway	+110 kg	—	—	—	—	—	—	—	—	—	—
2026	Ningbo, China	+110 kg	160	~~165~~	~~165~~	24	—	—	—	—	—	—
IWF World Cup
2024	Phuket, Thailand	+109 kg	175	181	~~185~~	10	~~228~~	~~228~~	—	—	—	—
Oceania Championships
2016	Suva, Fiji	+105 kg	146	152	157	4	~~200~~	200	206	2nd place, silver medalist(s)	363	4
2018	Mont-Dore, New Caledonia	+105 kg	160	—	—	1st place, gold medalist(s)	200	—	—	1st place, gold medalist(s)	360	1st place, gold medalist(s)
2024	Auckland, New Zealand	+109 kg	177	~~182~~	~~183~~	2nd place, silver medalist(s)	223	230	236	1st place, gold medalist(s)	413	1st place, gold medalist(s)
Pacific Games
2015	Port Moresby, Papua New Guinea	+105 kg	131	135	140	6	172	177	181	3rd place, bronze medalist(s)	321	3rd place, bronze medalist(s)
2019	Apia, Samoa	+109 kg	173	177	~~180~~	2nd place, silver medalist(s)	~~220~~	~~220~~	~~220~~	—	—	—
2023	Honiara, Solomon Islands	+109 kg	~~176~~	176	182	1st place, gold medalist(s)	216	223	—	1st place, gold medalist(s)	405	1st place, gold medalist(s)
