= 2022 World Weightlifting Championships – Men's +109 kg =

Weightlifting competition

The men's +109 kilograms competition at the 2022 World Weightlifting Championships was held on 16 December 2022.

== Schedule ==
| Date | Time | Event |
|---|---|---|
| 16 December 2022 | 11:30 | Group C |
| 16 December 2022 | 14:00 | Group B |
| 16 December 2022 | 16:30 | Group A |

== Medalists ==
| Event | Gold | | Silver | | Bronze | |
|---|---|---|---|---|---|---|
| Snatch | Lasha Talakhadze (GEO) | 215 kg | Varazdat Lalayan (ARM) | 215 kg | Gor Minasyan (BHR) | 212 kg |
| Clean & Jerk | Lasha Talakhadze (GEO) | 251 kg | Gor Minasyan (BHR) | 250 kg | Man Asaad (SYR) | 247 kg |
| Total | Lasha Talakhadze (GEO) | 466 kg | Gor Minasyan (BHR) | 462 kg | Varazdat Lalayan (ARM) | 461 kg |

== Records ==
Prior to this competition, the existing world records were as follows.

| World Record | Snatch | Lasha Talakhadze (GEO) | 225 kg | Tashkent, Uzbekistan | 17 December 2021 |
| World Record | Clean & Jerk | Lasha Talakhadze (GEO) | 267 kg | Tashkent, Uzbekistan | 17 December 2021 |
| World Record | Total | Lasha Talakhadze (GEO) | 492 kg | Tashkent, Uzbekistan | 17 December 2021 |

== Results ==
| Rank | Athlete | Group | Snatch (kg) | | | | Clean & Jerk (kg) | | | | Total |
| Rank | Athlete | Group | 1 | 2 | 3 | Rank | 1 | 2 | 3 | Rank | Total |
|---|---|---|---|---|---|---|---|---|---|---|---|
| 1st place, gold medalist(s) | Lasha Talakhadze (GEO) | A | 208 | 215 | ~~220~~ | 1st place, gold medalist(s) | ~~245~~ | 245 | 251 | 1st place, gold medalist(s) | 466 |
| 2nd place, silver medalist(s) | Gor Minasyan (BHR) | A | 205 | 212 | ~~216~~ | 3rd place, bronze medalist(s) | ~~241~~ | 242 | 250 | 2nd place, silver medalist(s) | 462 |
| 3rd place, bronze medalist(s) | Varazdat Lalayan (ARM) | A | 205 | 210 | 215 | 2nd place, silver medalist(s) | ~~245~~ | ~~245~~ | 246 | 5 | 461 |
| 4 | Ali Davoudi (IRI) | A | 197 | 202 | ~~204~~ | 4 | 240 | 247 | ~~252~~ | 4 | 449 |
| 5 | Man Asaad (SYR) | A | 192 | 198 | ~~203~~ | 5 | 237 | 247 | ~~252~~ | 3rd place, bronze medalist(s) | 445 |
| 6 | Abdelrahman El-Sayed (EGY) | A | 185 | ~~191~~ | 191 | 8 | 236 | 242 | ~~247~~ | 6 | 433 |
| 7 | Ayat Sharifi (IRI) | A | 190 | 196 | ~~201~~ | 6 | ~~230~~ | ~~230~~ | 236 | 7 | 432 |
| 8 | Simon Martirosyan (ARM) | A | ~~190~~ | 190 | ~~200~~ | 10 | 235 | ~~240~~ | ~~240~~ | 8 | 425 |
| 9 | Walid Bidani (ALG) | A | 195 | ~~201~~ | ~~203~~ | 7 | 225 | ~~235~~ | — | 12 | 420 |
| 10 | Jo Seong-bin (KOR) | B | 180 | ~~185~~ | 188 | 11 | 220 | 227 | 230 | 10 | 418 |
| 11 | Hwang Woo-man (KOR) | B | 180 | ~~190~~ | 190 | 9 | 215 | 226 | ~~230~~ | 11 | 416 |
| 12 | Kamil Kučera (CZE) | B | ~~178~~ | 180 | ~~185~~ | 15 | 225 | ~~230~~ | 231 | 9 | 411 |
| 13 | Kosuke Chinen (JPN) | B | 176 | 184 | ~~194~~ | 12 | 214 | ~~220~~ | 220 | 15 | 404 |
| 14 | Eishiro Murakami (JPN) | B | 180 | ~~188~~ | ~~190~~ | 13 | ~~215~~ | 215 | 220 | 14 | 400 |
| 15 | Mart Seim (EST) | B | 170 | ~~175~~ | 177 | 16 | ~~220~~ | ~~220~~ | 220 | 16 | 397 |
| 16 | David Liti (NZL) | C | 167 | 170 | 173 | 18 | 218 | 223 | — | 13 | 396 |
| 17 | Dixon Arroyo (ECU) | C | 171 | ~~176~~ | 176 | 17 | ~~190~~ | 190 | ~~197~~ | 21 | 366 |
| 18 | Gordon Shaw (GBR) | C | 163 | ~~170~~ | ~~170~~ | 20 | 192 | 197 | 201 | 18 | 364 |
| 19 | Kim Tollefsen (NOR) | C | 155 | 160 | 163 | 21 | 195 | 200 | ~~202~~ | 19 | 363 |
| 20 | Quinn Everett (CAN) | C | 156 | ~~160~~ | 162 | 22 | ~~194~~ | 194 | ~~199~~ | 20 | 356 |
| 21 | Gurdeep Singh (IND) | C | 145 | — | — | 23 | 205 | ~~215~~ | ~~216~~ | 17 | 350 |
| 22 | Bokang Kagiso (BOT) | C | 120 | 126 | 131 | 24 | ~~150~~ | 150 | — | 22 | 281 |
| — | David Litvinov (ISR) | B | 180 | ~~185~~ | ~~185~~ | 14 | — | — | — | — | — |
| — | Jiří Orság (CZE) | B | 170 | ~~177~~ | ~~177~~ | 19 | — | — | — | — | — |
| — | Akbar Djuraev (UZB) | A | — | — | — | — | — | — | — | — | — |
| — | Enzo Kuworge (NED) | B | — | — | — | — | — | — | — | — | — |
| — | Hsieh Yun-ting (TPE) | C | — | — | — | — | — | — | — | — | — |
