= Gor Minasyan =

Armenian weightlifter (born 1994)

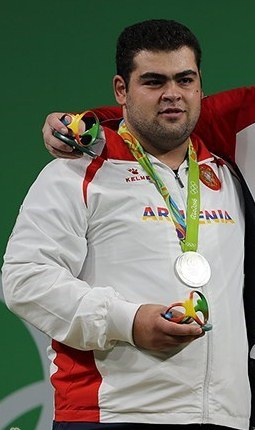
- Minasyan at the 2016 Summer Olympics

Personal information
- Nationality: Armenia; Bahrain
- Born: 25 October 1994 (age 32) Gyumri, Armenia
- Education: Gyumri State Pedagogical Institute
- Height: 1.80 m (5 ft 11 in)
- Weight: 150.80 kg (332 lb)

Sport
- Country: Bahrain
- Sport: Weightlifting
- Event: +109 kg

Achievements and titles
- Personal bests: Snatch: 217 kg (2023); Clean and jerk: 250 kg (2022); Total: 464 kg (2021)
Medal record
Representing Bahrain
Olympic Games
Bronze medal – third place	2024 Paris	+102 kg
World Championships
Silver medal – second place	2022 Bogotá	+109 kg
Silver medal – second place	2025 Førde	+110 kg
Bronze medal – third place	2023 Riyadh	+109 kg
Asian Games
Gold medal – first place	2022 Hangzhou	+109 kg
Bronze medal – third place	2026 Aichi–Nagoya	+110 kg
Asian Championships
Gold medal – first place	2022 Manama	+109 kg
Gold medal – first place	2023 Jinju	+109 kg
Gold medal – first place	2026 Gandhinagar	+110 kg
Silver medal – second place	2024 Tashkent	+109 kg
Islamic Solidarity Games
Gold medal – first place	2025 Riyadh	+110 kg S
Gold medal – first place	2025 Riyadh	+110 kg C
Gold medal – first place	2025 Riyadh	+110 kg T
Representing Armenia
Olympic Games
Silver medal – second place	2016 Rio de Janeiro	+105 kg
World Championships
Silver medal – second place	2018 Ashgabat	+109 kg
Silver medal – second place	2019 Pattaya	+109 kg
Bronze medal – third place	2015 Houston	+105 kg
Bronze medal – third place	2021 Tashkent	+109 kg
European Championships
Silver medal – second place	2016 Førde	+105 kg
Silver medal – second place	2017 Split	+105 kg
Silver medal – second place	2021 Moscow	+109 kg
Bronze medal – third place	2022 Tirana	+109 kg

Gor Minasyan (Armenian: Գոռ Մինասյան; born 25 October 1994) is an Armenian-Bahraini weightlifter, and two-time Olympic medalist competing in the super-heavyweight category. (+105 kg until 2018 and +109 kg starting in 2018 after the International Weightlifting Federation reorganized the categories)

== Career ==
Minasyan was the youth world record holder for the snatch in the +94 kg division till middle of 2018 when new bodyweight category announced. Minasyan won a silver medal at the 2010 Summer Youth Olympics.

Minasyan was banned for 2 years in 2013 after testing positive for norandrosterone.

Minasyan was the bronze medalist at the 2015 World Weightlifting Championships, and the silver medalist at the 2016 European Weightlifting Championships, 2017 European Weightlifting Championships, 2018 World Weightlifting Championships, and the 2016 Summer Olympics.

In 2021, Minasyan won the bronze medal in the men's +109 kg event at the World Weightlifting Championships held in Tashkent, Uzbekistan.

In July 2022, Minasyan began competing for Bahrain, as Armenia had three leading super heavyweights but only two weightlifters in each weight category are allowed per country in international competitions.

He won the gold medal in the men's +109 kg event at the 2022 Asian Weightlifting Championships held in Manama, Bahrain.

In May 2023, Minasyan successfully defended his Asian title, winning the +109 kg event at the 2023 Asian Weightlifting Championships held in Jinju, South Korea, matching his best total of 464 kg.

In August 2024, Minasyan won a bronze medal in the men's +102 kg event at the 2024 Summer Olympics held in Paris, France.

== Major results ==
Year	Venue	Weight	Snatch (kg)				Clean & Jerk (kg)				Total	Rank
Year	Venue	Weight	1	2	3	Rank	1	2	3	Rank	Total	Rank
Olympic Games
2016	Rio de Janeiro, Brazil	+105 kg	200	207	210	—N/a	236	~~241~~	241	—N/a	451	2nd place, silver medalist(s)
2024	Paris, France	+102 kg	210	216	~~220~~	—N/a	245	~~255~~	~~255~~	—N/a	461	3rd place, bronze medalist(s)
World Championships
2015	Houston, United States	+105 kg	195	201	203	2nd place, silver medalist(s)	234	~~240~~	~~240~~	8	437	3rd place, bronze medalist(s)
2018	Ashgabat, Turkmenistan	+109 kg	200	205	~~211~~	2nd place, silver medalist(s)	240	245	~~250~~	2nd place, silver medalist(s)	450	2nd place, silver medalist(s)
2019	Pattaya, Thailand	+109 kg	200	207	212	2nd place, silver medalist(s)	237	243	248	2nd place, silver medalist(s)	460	2nd place, silver medalist(s)
2021	Tashkent, Uzbekistan	+109 kg	205	~~213~~	~~213~~	4	240	243	~~253~~	3rd place, bronze medalist(s)	448	3rd place, bronze medalist(s)
2022	Bogotá, Colombia	+109 kg	205	212	~~216~~	3rd place, bronze medalist(s)	~~241~~	242	250	2nd place, silver medalist(s)	462	2nd place, silver medalist(s)
2023	Riyadh, Saudi Arabia	+109 kg	205	213	~~220~~	2nd place, silver medalist(s)	240	246	~~253~~	5	459	3rd place, bronze medalist(s)
2024	Manama, Bahrain	+109 kg	205	210	~~215~~	2nd place, silver medalist(s)	~~245~~	~~245~~	245	5	455	4
2025	Førde, Norway	+110 kg	~~205~~	205	~~210~~	2nd place, silver medalist(s)	242	~~251~~	—	2nd place, silver medalist(s)	447	2nd place, silver medalist(s)
Asian Games
2023	Hangzhou, China	+109 kg	205	212 GR	—	—N/a	235	245 GR	—	—N/a	457 GR	1st place, gold medalist(s)
2026	Nagoya, Japan	+110 kg	205	~~211~~	~~211~~	—N/a	~~235~~	235	~~246~~	—N/a	440	3rd place, bronze medalist(s)
Asian Championships
2022	Manama, Bahrain	+109 kg	201	205	210	1st place, gold medalist(s)	237	~~242~~	242	2nd place, silver medalist(s)	452	1st place, gold medalist(s)
2023	Jinju, South Korea	+109 kg	203	213	217	1st place, gold medalist(s)	235	~~246~~	247	1st place, gold medalist(s)	464	1st place, gold medalist(s)
2024	Tashkent, Uzbekistan	+109 kg	201	207	~~212~~	1st place, gold medalist(s)	236	~~242~~	~~242~~	2nd place, silver medalist(s)	443	2nd place, silver medalist(s)
2026	Ghandinagar, India	+110 kg	202	208	212	1st place, gold medalist(s)	240	245	—	2nd place, silver medalist(s)	457	1st place, gold medalist(s)
European Championships
2013	Tirana, Albania	+105 kg	180	~~185~~	185	7	~~215~~	215	—	8	400	7
2016	Førde, Norway	+105 kg	195	200	205	2nd place, silver medalist(s)	~~231~~	231	237	4	442	2nd place, silver medalist(s)
2017	Split, Croatia	+105 kg	200	205	211	2nd place, silver medalist(s)	235	~~240~~	~~240~~	5	446	2nd place, silver medalist(s)
2019	Batumi, Georgia	+109 kg	200	~~205~~	~~205~~	3rd place, bronze medalist(s)	222	~~234~~	—	7	422	5
2021	Moscow, Russia	+109 kg	205	212	216	2nd place, silver medalist(s)	240	248	~~252~~	2nd place, silver medalist(s)	464	2nd place, silver medalist(s)
2022	Tirana, Albania	+109 kg	202	~~210~~	210	3rd place, bronze medalist(s)	236	~~245~~	~~245~~	4	446	3rd place, bronze medalist(s)
World Junior Championships
2011	Penang, Malaysia	+105 kg	170	175	178	1st place, gold medalist(s)	200	206	~~208~~	5	384	4
2012	Antigua Guatemala, Guatemala	+105 kg	180	186	190	2nd place, silver medalist(s)	220	227	~~230~~	3rd place, bronze medalist(s)	417	3rd place, bronze medalist(s)
2013	Lima, Peru	+105 kg	177	183	~~187~~	—	206	213	220	—	DSQ	—
European Junior & U23 Championships
2011	Bucharest, Romania	+105 kg	172	178	179	2nd place, silver medalist(s)	202	210	216	2nd place, silver medalist(s)	395	2nd place, silver medalist(s)
2012	Eilat, Israel	+105 kg	180	187	191	2nd place, silver medalist(s)	210	220	~~230~~	3rd place, bronze medalist(s)	411	3rd place, bronze medalist(s)
2017	Durrës, Albania	+105 kg	190	200	—	1st place, gold medalist(s)	220	~~240~~	—	1st place, gold medalist(s)	420	1st place, gold medalist(s)
Youth Olympic Games
2010	Singapore, Singapore	+85 kg	~~155~~	155	160	—N/a	~~190~~	190	~~195~~	—N/a	350	2nd place, silver medalist(s)
World Youth Championships
2011	Lima, Peru	+94 kg	165	171	174	1st place, gold medalist(s)	200	205	~~207~~	1st place, gold medalist(s)	379	1st place, gold medalist(s)
European Youth Championships
2010	Valencia, Spain	+94 kg	148	~~155~~	155	2nd place, silver medalist(s)	178	185	~~190~~	2nd place, silver medalist(s)	340	2nd place, silver medalist(s)
2011	Ciechanów, Poland	+94 kg	165	181	—	1st place, gold medalist(s)	200	209	—	1st place, gold medalist(s)	390	1st place, gold medalist(s)
Universiade
2017	Taipei, Taiwan	+105 kg	195	200	~~206~~	—N/a	~~230~~	230	~~235~~	—N/a	430	1st place, gold medalist(s)
IWF Grand Prix
2015	Grozny, Russia; 5th Presidents Cup	+105 kg	190	~~195~~	195	2nd place, silver medalist(s)	225	~~230~~	230	4	425	2nd place, silver medalist(s)
2019	Doha, Qatar; 6th International Qatar Cup	+109 kg	190	191	198	1st place, gold medalist(s)	220	226	—	3rd place, bronze medalist(s)	424	1st place, gold medalist(s)
