= Eishiro Murakami =

Japanese weightlifter (born 1995)

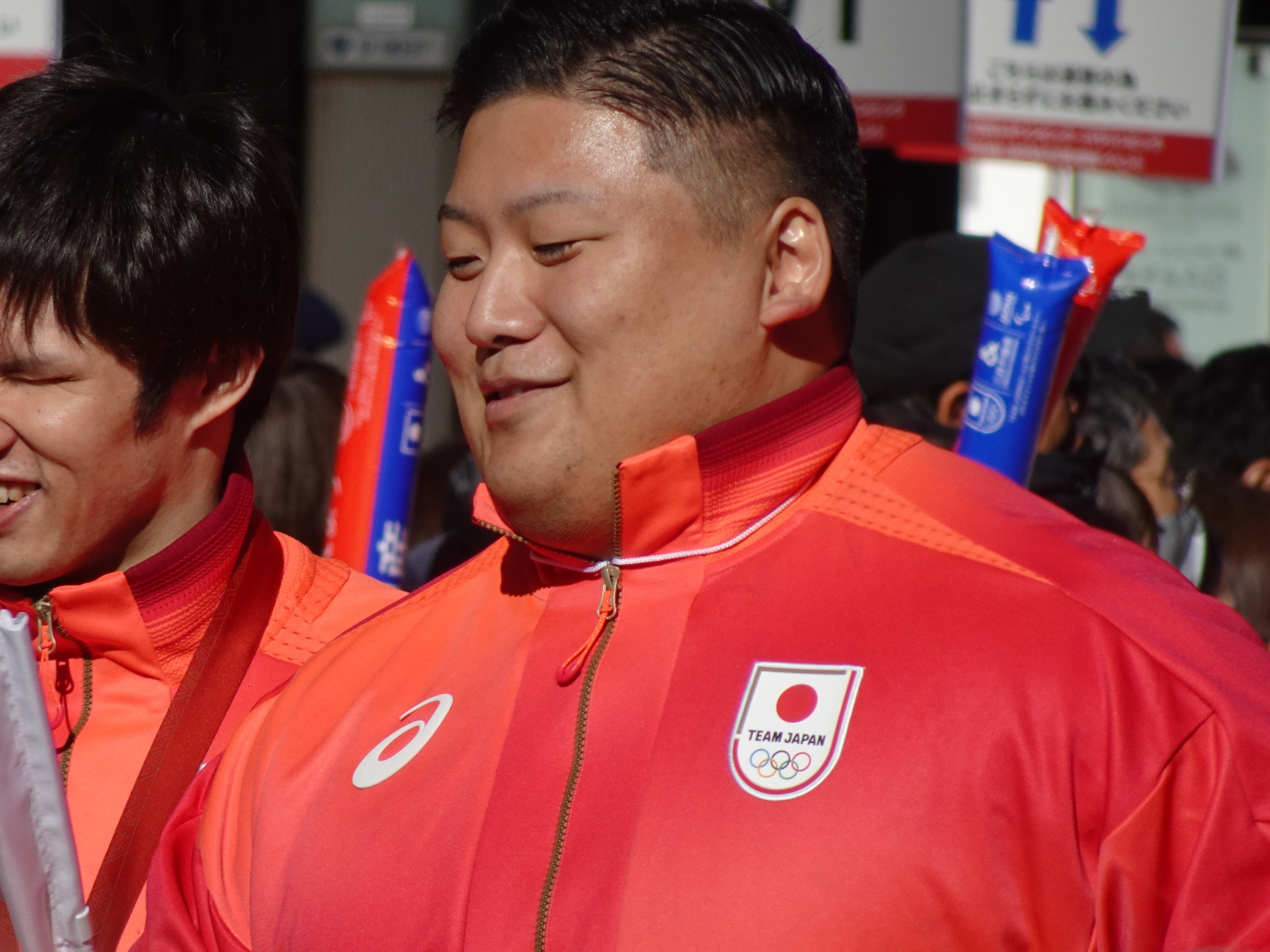
- Murakami in 2024

Personal information
- Nickname: The Tank
- Born: 8 August 1995 (age 31) Toyama, Japan
- Education: Nihon University, Waseda University

Sport
- Country: Japan
- Sport: Weightlifting
Medal record
Weightlifting
Representing Japan
Asian Championships
Bronze medal – third place	2020 Tashkent	+109 kg
World Cup
Gold medal – first place	2019 Tianjin	+109 kg

Eishiro Murakami (born 8 August 1995), nicknamed "The Tank", is a Japanese weightlifter. He competed in the men's +102 kg event at the 2024 Summer Olympics.

== Major results ==
Year	Venue	Weight	Snatch (kg)				Clean & Jerk (kg)				Total	Rank
Year	Venue	Weight	1	2	3	Rank	1	2	3	Rank	Total	Rank
Olympic Games
2024	Paris, France	102 kg	170	~~180~~	180	—N/a	200	220	~~230~~	—N/a	400	10
World Championships
2019	Pattaya, Thailand	+109 kg	180	~~185~~	185	11	217	224	230	10	415	11
2022	Bogotá, Colombia	+109 kg	180	~~188~~	~~190~~	13	~~215~~	215	220	14	400	14
2023	Riyadh, Saudi Arabia	+109 kg	176	181	~~185~~	11	220	~~225~~	~~231~~	12	401	11
IWF World Cup
2019	Tianjin, China	+109 kg	180	185	~~189~~	1st place, gold medalist(s)	220	228	231	1st place, gold medalist(s)	416	1st place, gold medalist(s)
2024	Phuket, Thailand	+109 kg	185	190	~~192~~	7	~~232~~	~~232~~	~~237~~	—	—	—
Asian Championships
2016	Tashkent, Uzbekistan	+105 kg	155	~~165~~	165	10	190	200	205	9	370	10
2021	Tashkent, Uzbekistan	+109 kg	180	185	190	3rd place, bronze medalist(s)	225	~~230~~	~~232~~	3rd place, bronze medalist(s)	415	3rd place, bronze medalist(s)
2023	Jinju, South Korea	+109 kg	180	185	~~190~~	6	216	~~226~~	~~236~~	9	401	8
2024	Tashkent, Uzbekistan	+109 kg	183	188	190	5	225	231	~~235~~	5	421	5
