= Man Asaad =

Syrian heavyweight weightlifter

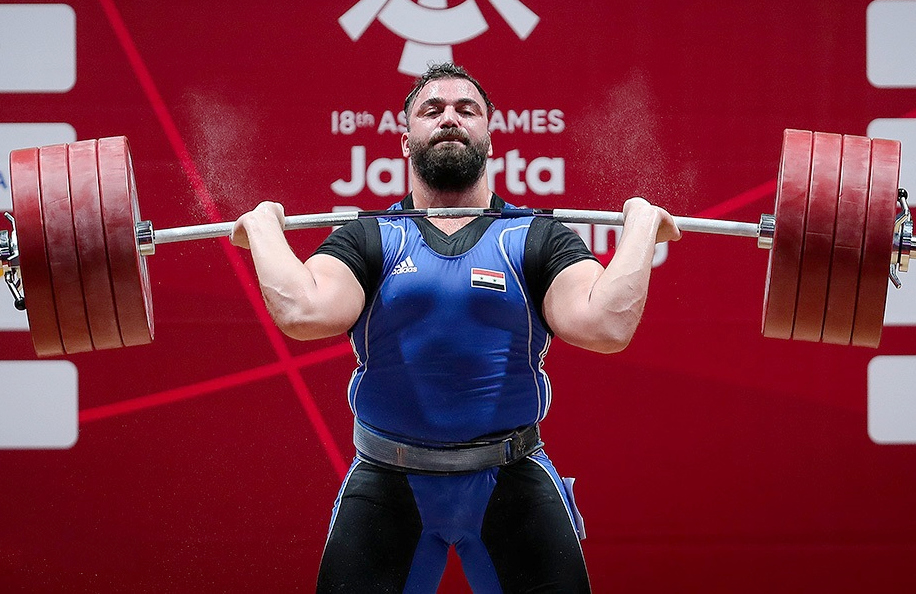
- Asaad at the 2018 Asian Games

Personal information
- Nationality: Syrian
- Born: 20 November 1993 (age 32) Hama, Syria
- Home town: Damascus, Syria
- Education: Tishreen University
- Years active: 2015–
- Height: 190 cm (6 ft 3 in)
- Weight: 143 kg (315 lb)

Sport
- Country: Syria
- Sport: Weightlifting
- Event: +109 kg
- Coached by: Qais Asaad

Achievements and titles
- Personal bests: Snatch: 198 kg (2022); Clean and jerk: 252 kg (2024); Total: 445 kg (2022)
Medal record
Men's weightlifting
Representing Syria
Olympic Games
Bronze medal – third place	2020 Tokyo	+109 kg
Asian Championships
Gold medal – first place	2024 Tashkent	+109 kg
Silver medal – second place	2020 Tashkent	+109 kg
Mediterranean Games
Gold medal – first place	2022 Oran	+102 kg Clean&Jerk
Silver medal – second place	2022 Oran	+102 kg Snatch
Arab Games
Gold medal – first place	2023 Algiers	+102 kg Clean&Jerk
Gold medal – first place	2023 Algiers	+102 kg Snatch

Man Asaad (Note: His family name is sometimes mistranscribed as "Assad".) (Arabic: معن أسعد / ALA-LC: Maʻn Asʻad, Arabic pronunciation: [maʕn ˈʔasʕad]; born 20 November 1993) is a Syrian heavyweight weightlifter who competes in the +109 kg category. He won the bronze medal in the men's +109 kg event at the 2020 Summer Olympics held in Tokyo, Japan.

== Career ==
On 11 April 2010, he was given a two-year ban by the International Weightlifting Federation after he tested positive for the banned substance metandienone.

He made his debut appearance at the Olympics representing Syria at the 2016 Olympics and was placed 15th in +105kg event. He was placed fifth at the 2018 Asian Games.

He qualified to represent Syria at the 2020 Summer Olympics in Tokyo, Japan. He competed in the men's +109 kg event with a total of 424 kg and claimed bronze medal in the event. It was also Syria's first medal of the 2020 Tokyo Olympics.

He won two medals at the 2022 Mediterranean Games held in Oran, Algeria. He won the silver medal in the men's +102 kg Snatch event and the gold medal in the men's +102 kg Clean & Jerk event.

He won bronze medal in the men's +109 kg Clean&Jerk event at the 2022 World Weightlifting Championships held in Bogotá, Colombia.

In February 2024 he successfully earned his first Asian title, winning the +109 kg event at the 2024 Asian Weightlifting Championships held in Tashkent, Uzbekistan, matching his PR total of 444 kg.

In August 2024, he finished in fifth place in the men's +102 kg event at the 2024 Summer Olympics held in Paris, France.

== Major results ==
Year	Venue	Weight	Snatch (kg)				Clean & Jerk (kg)				Total	Rank
Year	Venue	Weight	1	2	3	Rank	1	2	3	Rank	Total	Rank
Olympic Games
2016	Rio de Janeiro, Brazil	+109 kg	180	~~187~~	~~187~~	—N/a	220	~~233~~	~~233~~	—N/a	400	15
2021	Tokyo, Japan	+109 kg	185	190	~~197~~	—N/a	228	234	~~242~~	—N/a	424	3rd place, bronze medalist(s)
2024	Paris, France	+102 kg	191	197	~~201~~	—N/a	235	241	~~253~~	—N/a	438	5
World Championships
2019	Pattaya, Thailand	+109 kg	183	189	~~192~~	8	225	233	241	5	430	6
2022	Bogotá, Colombia	+109 kg	192	198	~~203~~	5	237	247	~~252~~	3rd place, bronze medalist(s)	445	5
Asian Games
2018	Jakarta, Indonesia	+105 kg	180	~~185~~	187	—N/a	~~225~~	~~225~~	~~225~~	—N/a	—	—
Asian Championships
2015	Phuket, Thailand	+105 kg	170	~~178~~	~~178~~	4	~~200~~	200	~~215~~	5	370	5
2016	Tashkent, Uzbekistan	+105 kg	170	~~182~~	186	4	215	~~227~~	232	5	418	5
2019	Ningbo, China	+109 kg	183	188	~~193~~	3rd place, bronze medalist(s)	222	~~230~~	~~231~~	5	410	5
2021	Tashkent, Uzbekistan	+109 kg	186	191	195	2nd place, silver medalist(s)	230	~~238~~	238	2nd place, silver medalist(s)	433	2nd place, silver medalist(s)
2024	Tashkent, Uzbekistan	+109 kg	192	~~200~~	~~200~~	2nd place, silver medalist(s)	237	252 AR	—	1st place, gold medalist(s)	444	1st place, gold medalist(s)
Mediterranean Games
2022	Oran, Algeria	+102 kg	191	197	~~203~~	2nd place, silver medalist(s)	232	242	247	1st place, gold medalist(s)	—N/a	
Arab Games
2023	Algiers, Algeria	+102 kg	175	175	—	1st place, gold medalist(s)	225	225	—	1st place, gold medalist(s)	—N/a	
Asian Junior Championships
2013	Doha, Qatar	+105 kg	150	156	~~162~~	1st place, gold medalist(s)	185	~~192~~	~~193~~	2nd place, silver medalist(s)	341	2nd place, silver medalist(s)
