= Varazdat Lalayan =

Armenian weightlifter (born 1999)

- Lalayan at the 2024 Olympics

Personal information
- Born: 1 May 1999 (age 27) Gyumri, Armenia
- Weight: 152.5 kg (336 lb)

Sport
- Country: Armenia
- Sport: Weightlifting
- Weight class: +109 kg
- Coached by: Pashik Alaverdyan
Medal record
Men's weightlifting
Representing Armenia
Olympic Games
Silver medal – second place	2024 Paris	+102 kg
World Championships
Gold medal – first place	2024 Manama	+109 kg
Gold medal – first place	2025 Førde	+110 kg
Silver medal – second place	2021 Tashkent	+109 kg
Silver medal – second place	2023 Riyadh	+109 kg
Bronze medal – third place	2022 Bogotá	+109 kg
Bronze medal – third place	2026 Ningbo	+110 kg
European Championships
Gold medal – first place	2024 Sofia	+109 kg
Gold medal – first place	2025 Chișinău	+109 kg
Gold medal – first place	2026 Batumi	+110 kg
Silver medal – second place	2022 Tirana	+109 kg
Silver medal – second place	2023 Yerevan	+109 kg
Bronze medal – third place	2021 Moscow	+109 kg

Varazdat Lalayan (born 1 May 1999, Gyumri, Armenia) is an Armenian weightlifter. He is a five-time medalist, including two gold medals, at the World Weightlifting Championships and a five-time medalist, including two gold medals, at the European Weightlifting Championships.

== Career ==
In 2018, Lalayan won the silver medal in both the men's +105 kg event at the Junior World Weightlifting Championships held in Tashkent, Uzbekistan and the junior men's +105 kg event at the European Junior & U23 Weightlifting Championships held in Zamość, Poland.

A year later, Lalayan won the gold medal in the men's +109 kg event at both the 2019 Junior World Weightlifting Championships held in Suva, Fiji and the 2019 European Junior & U23 Weightlifting Championships held in Bucharest, Romania.

Lalayan won the bronze medal in the men's +109 kg event at the 2021 European Weightlifting Championships held in Moscow, Russia. At the 2021 European Junior & U23 Weightlifting Championships in Rovaniemi, Finland, he won the gold medal in his event.

He won the silver medal in the men's +109 kg event at the 2021 World Weightlifting Championships held in Tashkent, Uzbekistan. the 2023 Asian Weightlifting Championships held in Jinju, South Korea, matching his PR total of 464 kg.

In August 2024, he finished in second place and won a silver medal in the men's +102 kg event at the 2024 Summer Olympics held in Paris, France.

== Achievements ==
Year	Venue	Weight	Snatch (kg)				Clean & Jerk (kg)				Total	Rank
Year	Venue	Weight	1	2	3	Rank	1	2	3	Rank	Total	Rank
Olympic Games
2024	Paris, France	+102 kg	210	215	~~218~~	—N/a	247	252	~~256~~	—N/a	467	2nd place, silver medalist(s)
World Championships
2021	Tashkent, Uzbekistan	+109 kg	202	207	211	2nd place, silver medalist(s)	~~240~~	242	246	2nd place, silver medalist(s)	457	2nd place, silver medalist(s)
2022	Bogotá, Colombia	+109 kg	202	210	215	2nd place, silver medalist(s)	~~245~~	~~245~~	246	5	461	3rd place, bronze medalist(s)
2023	Riyadh, Saudi Arabia	+109 kg	205	212	~~217~~	3rd place, bronze medalist(s)	242	248	~~255~~	4	460	2nd place, silver medalist(s)
2024	Manama, Bahrain	+109 kg	206	211	215	1st place, gold medalist(s)	245	~~252~~	252	3rd place, bronze medalist(s)	467	1st place, gold medalist(s)
2025	Førde, Norway	+110 kg	206	~~211~~	211	1st place, gold medalist(s)	245	250	~~261~~	1st place, gold medalist(s)	461	1st place, gold medalist(s)
2026	Ningbo, China	+110 kg	205	210	~~214~~	2nd place, silver medalist(s)	247	~~252~~	~~257~~	3rd place, bronze medalist(s)	457	3rd place, bronze medalist(s)
IWF World Cup
2024	Phuket, Thailand	+109 kg	205	210	~~215~~	1st place, gold medalist(s)	243	253	—	1st place, gold medalist(s)	463	1st place, gold medalist(s)
European Championships
2021	Moscow, Russia	+109 kg	200	205	~~209~~	3rd place, bronze medalist(s)	240	~~250~~	~~250~~	3rd place, bronze medalist(s)	445	3rd place, bronze medalist(s)
2022	Tirana, Albania	+109 kg	203	~~211~~	211	2nd place, silver medalist(s)	240	~~252~~	~~252~~	2nd place, silver medalist(s)	451	2nd place, silver medalist(s)
2023	Yerevan, Armenia	+109 kg	205	212	~~218~~	2nd place, silver medalist(s)	240	~~250~~	250	2nd place, silver medalist(s)	462	2nd place, silver medalist(s)
2024	Sofia, Bulgaria	+109 kg	200	205	~~210~~	1st place, gold medalist(s)	240	250	—	1st place, gold medalist(s)	455	1st place, gold medalist(s)
2025	Chișinău, Moldova	+109 kg	200	210	~~218~~	1st place, gold medalist(s)	240	~~250~~	—	1st place, gold medalist(s)	450	1st place, gold medalist(s)
2026	Batumi, Georgia	+110 kg	200	210	—	1st place, gold medalist(s)	241	~~253~~	~~253~~	1st place, gold medalist(s)	451	1st place, gold medalist(s)
