= Gurdeep Singh (weightlifter) =

Indian weightlifter (born 1995)

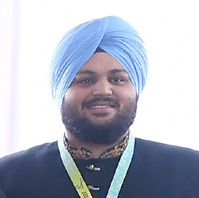
- Singh in August 2022

Personal information
- Born: 1 October 1995 (age 30) Ludhiana, Punjab, India
- Height: 1.90 m (6 ft 3 in)
- Weight: {+109}

Sport
- Sport: Weightlifting
- Event: Men's +109 kilograms
Medal record
Men's weightlifting
Representing India
Commonwealth Games
Bronze medal – third place	2022 Birmingham	+109 kg
Commonwealth Championships
Bronze medal – third place	2021 Tashkent	+109 kg
Bronze medal – third place	2017 Gold Coast	+105 kg

Gurdeep Singh (born 1 October 1995) is an Indian weightlifter hailing from Khanna town of Punjab. He won the bronze medal in both Commonwealth Weightlifting Championships at 2017 Gold Coast and 2021 Tashkent. In 2018, he broke the national record in the 105+ kg category at the National Weightlifting Championships, winning the gold medal in the process. He won the bronze medal at the 2022 Commonwealth Games in the 109+ kg category.
