= Weightlifting at the 2024 Summer Olympics =

Weightlifting at the Games of the XXXIII Olympiad
- Venue: Paris Expo Porte de Versailles
- Dates: 7–11 August 2024
- No. of events: 10 (5 men, 5 women)
- Competitors: 122 from 57 nations

The weightlifting competitions at the 2024 Summer Olympics in Paris took place from 7 to 11 August at the Paris Expo Porte de Versailles. Several significant changes were instituted in the weightlifting program for Paris 2024, as the number of categories was trimmed from fourteen in Tokyo to ten. Furthermore, 120 weightlifters, with an equal split between men and women, competed in each of the ten weight classes, a massive drop from the 196 at the previous Games.

== Qualification ==
120 weightlifting quota places, with an equal distribution between men and women, were available for Paris 2024, almost eighty fewer overall than those in Tokyo 2020. Qualified NOCs were permitted to enter a maximum of three weightlifters per gender, with a maximum of one in each bodyweight category.

Over eighty-three percent of the total quota was awarded to the ten highest-ranked weightlifters across ten weight classes through the biennial IWF Olympic Qualification Ranking list (running from 1 August 2022, to 28 April 2024). Five more spots per gender were offered to the highest-ranked weightlifter vying for qualification and outside the top ten based on their continental representation (Africa, the Americas, Asia, Europe, or Oceania) from the list.

Host country France reserved two men's and two women's quota places in weightlifting, while a further three places per gender were entitled to eligible NOCs to have their weightlifters compete in Paris 2024 as granted by the Universality principle.

== Competition format ==
On 14 June 2022, the International Weightlifting Federation officially announced the new weight categories for Paris 2024, with the total medal count reducing from fourteen to ten. Among the weightlifting medal events, the 61 and 73 kg categories for men and the 49 and 59 kg for women remain present from Tokyo 2020. The 67 and 96 kg classes for men and 55 and 64 kg classes for women were removed. The following list is the official weight categories for men and women, respectively.

Men's weight classes

- 61 kg
- 73 kg
- 89 kg
- 102 kg
- +102 kg

Women's weight classes

- 49 kg
- 59 kg
- 71 kg
- 81 kg
- +81 kg

== Competition schedule ==
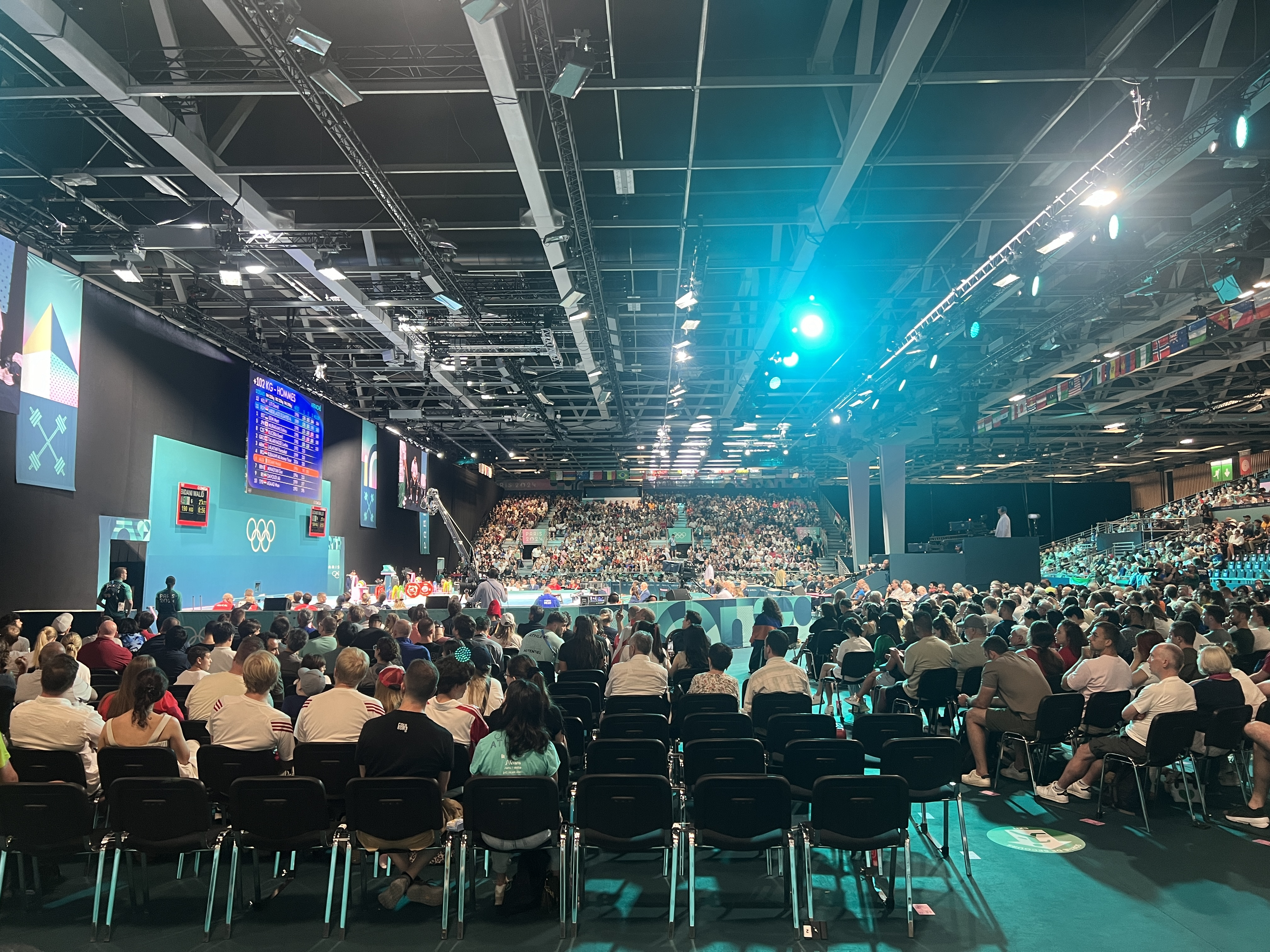
Weightlifting arena during competition

Schedule
Date→ Event↓	Wed 7		Thu 8		Fri 9		Sat 10			Sun 11
Date→ Event↓	15:00	19:30	15:00	19:30	15:00	19:30	11:30	16:00	20:30	11:30
Men's weight categories
Men's 61 kg	F									
Men's 73 kg				F						
Men's 89 kg					F					
Men's 102 kg							F			
Men's +102 kg									F	
Women's weight categories
Women's 49 kg		F								
Women's 59 kg			F							
Women's 71 kg						F				
Women's 81 kg								F		
Women's +81 kg										F

== Participating nations ==
There were 57 participating nations:

- Algeria (1)
- Armenia (3)
- Australia (3)
- Bahrain (2)
- Belgium (1)
- Brazil (2)
- Bulgaria (3)
- Canada (2)
- China (6)
- Colombia (4)
- Cuba (1)
- Czech Republic (1)
- Dominican Republic (3)
- Ecuador (3)
- Egypt (5)
- Estonia (1)
- France (4) (host)
- Georgia (3)
- Great Britain (1)
- Guam (1)
- India (1)
- Individual Neutral Athletes (2)
- Indonesia (3)
- Iran (2)
- Iraq (1)
- Italy (3)
- Japan (3)
- Kiribati (1)
- Latvia (1)
- Libya (1)
- Madagascar (1)
- Marshall Islands (1)
- Malaysia (1)
- Mexico (1)
- Moldova (1)
- Mongolia (1)
- New Zealand (1)
- Nigeria (2)
- Norway (1)
- Papua New Guinea (1)
- Philippines (3)
- Poland (1)
- Qatar (1)
- Refugee Olympic Team (2)
- Romania (2)
- Samoa (2)
- South Korea (5)
- Syria (1)
- Chinese Taipei (3)
- Thailand (4)
- Tunisia (1)
- Turkey (1)
- Turkmenistan (1)
- Ukraine (1)
- United States (5)
- Uzbekistan (3)
- Vanuatu (1)
- Venezuela (5)
- Vietnam (1)

== Medal summary ==
=== Medal table ===
* Host nation (France)

Rank	NOC	Gold	Silver	Bronze	Total
1	China	5	0	0	5
2	Bulgaria	1	0	1	2
2	United States	1	0	1	2
4	Georgia	1	0	0	1
4	Indonesia	1	0	0	1
4	Norway	1	0	0	1
7	Thailand	0	2	1	3
8	Colombia	0	2	0	2
9	Armenia	0	1	0	1
9	Canada	0	1	0	1
9	Egypt	0	1	0	1
9	Romania	0	1	0	1
9	South Korea	0	1	0	1
9	Uzbekistan	0	1	0	1
15	Ecuador	0	0	2	2
16	Bahrain	0	0	1	1
16	Chinese Taipei	0	0	1	1
16	Great Britain	0	0	1	1
16	Italy	0	0	1	1
–	Individual Neutral Athletes	0	0	1	1
Totals (19 entries)		10	10	10	30

=== Men's events ===
Event	Gold		Silver		Bronze	
61 kg	Li Fabin; China	310 kg	Theerapong Silachai; Thailand	303 kg	Hampton Morris; United States	298 kg
73 kg	Rizki Juniansyah; Indonesia	354 kg	Weeraphon Wichuma; Thailand	346 kg	Bozhidar Andreev; Bulgaria	344 kg
89 kg	Karlos Nasar; Bulgaria	404 kg WR	Yeison López; Colombia	390 kg	Antonino Pizzolato; Italy	384 kg
102 kg	Liu Huanhua; China	406 kg	Akbar Djuraev; Uzbekistan	404 kg	Yauheni Tsikhantsou; Individual Neutral Athletes	402 kg
+102 kg	Lasha Talakhadze; Georgia	470 kg	Varazdat Lalayan; Armenia	467 kg	Gor Minasyan; Bahrain	461 kg

=== Women's events ===
Event	Gold		Silver		Bronze	
49 kg	Hou Zhihui; China	206 kg	Mihaela Cambei; Romania	205 kg	Surodchana Khambao; Thailand	200 kg
59 kg	Luo Shifang; China	241 kg OR	Maude Charron; Canada	236 kg	Kuo Hsing-chun; Chinese Taipei	235 kg
71 kg	Olivia Reeves; United States	262 kg	Mari Sánchez; Colombia	257 kg	Angie Palacios; Ecuador	256 kg
81 kg	Solfrid Koanda; Norway	275 kg OR	Sara Ahmed; Egypt	268 kg	Neisi Dájomes; Ecuador	267 kg
+81 kg	Li Wenwen; China	309 kg	Park Hye-jeong; South Korea	299 kg	Emily Campbell; Great Britain	288 kg

== See also ==
- Powerlifting at the 2024 Summer Paralympics
