= Nassiri =

Nassiri is a surname. Notable people with the surname include:

- Alireza Nassiri (weightlifter) (born 2005), Iranian weightlifter
- Jamshid Nassiri (born 1959), Iranian-Indian football player and manager
- Kiyan Nassiri (born 2000), Indian football player
- Meisam Nassiri (born 1989), Iranian wrestler
- Mohammad Nasiri (born 1945), Iranian weightlifter
- Nematollah Nassiri (1910–1979), Iranian military officer
