= Turkmenistan at the 2026 Asian Games =

- IOC code: TKM
- NOC: National Olympic Committee of Turkmenistan

in Aichi–Nagoya, Japan September 19 – October 4, 2026
- Competitors: 37 in 8 sports
- Medals Ranked 31st: Gold 0 Silver 2 Bronze 0 Total 2

Asian Games appearances (overview)
- 1994; 1998; 2002; 2006; 2010; 2014; 2018; 2022; 2026

Turkmenstan was represented at the 2026 Asian Games in Aichi Prefecture and Nagoya, Japan by the National Olympic Committee of Turkmenistan. Aichi–Nagoya 2026 marked the ninth occasion that Tajikistan had competed at the Asian Games following its debut at the 1994 Asian Games in Hiroshima, Japan.

In total, 37 athletes including 27 men and 10 women represented Tajikistan in nine different sports including athletics, boxing, esports, karate, kurash, swimming, weightlifting, wrestling and wushu.

Turkmenistan won two medals at the Games after Dawut Nazmyradow and Şahzadbek Matýakubow both claimed silver in the men's karate kumite 75 kg category and the men's weightlifting 110 kg category respectively.

== Background ==
Aichi Prefecture and Nagoya, Japan were awarded the rights to host the 2026 Asian Games in September 2016. The games would take place between 19 September and 4 October 2026.

The 2026 Asian Games marked Turkmenistan's ninnth participation at the games, after making its debut at the 1994 Asian Games in Hiroshima, Japan.

== Competitors ==
In total, 37 athletes represented Turkmenistan at the 2026 Asian Games in Aichi–Nagoya, Japan across nine different sports.

| Sport | Men | Women | Total |
|---|---|---|---|
| Athletics | 1 | 2 | 3 |
| Boxing | 5 | 0 | 5 |
| Esports | 2 | 0 | 2 |
| Karate | 3 | 0 | 3 |
| Kurash | 3 | 3 | 6 |
| Swimming | 2 | 1 | 3 |
| Weightlifting | 2 | 2 | 4 |
| Wrestling | 6 | 0 | 6 |
| Wushu | 3 | 2 | 5 |
| Total | 27 | 10 | 37 |

== Medalists ==
Dawut Nazmyradow won silver in the men's karate kumite 75 kg category and Şahzadbek Matýakubow also won silver in the men's weightlifting 110 kg category.

| Medal | Name | Sport | Event | Date |
|---|---|---|---|---|
| Silver | Dawut Nazmyradow | Karate | Men's kumite 75 kg | 22 Sep |
| Silver | Şahzadbek Matýakubow | Weightlifting | Men's 110 kg | 29 Sep |

== Athletics ==
In total, three Turkmen athletes participated in the athletics events – Enejan Esedowa, Lukman Gurbandurdyýew and Valentina Meredova.

| Athlete | Event | Heat | | Semifinals | | Final | |
| Athlete | Event | Result | Rank | Result | Rank | Result | Rank |
|---|---|---|---|---|---|---|---|
| Lukman Gurbandurdyýew | Men's 100 m | 10.80 | 6 | Did not advance | | | |
| Lukman Gurbandurdyýew | Men's 200 m | 22.11 | 5 | Did not advance | | | |
| Valentina Meredova | Women's 100 m | 12.19 | 7 | Did not advance | | | |
| Enejan Esedowa | Women's 200 m | 25.16 | 8 | Did not advance | | | |

== Boxing ==
In total, five Turkmen athletes participated in the boxing events – Döwlet Muhanow, Baýramdurdy Nurmuhammedow, Daniýar Rozmetow, Abdyrahman Yklymow and Döwlet Yslamow.

| Athlete | Event | Round of 32 | Round of 16 | Quarterfinals | Semifinals | Final | |
| Athlete | Event | Opposition Result | Opposition Result | Opposition Result | Opposition Result | Opposition Result | Rank |
|---|---|---|---|---|---|---|---|
| Daniýar Rozmetow | 55 kg | Bokhunthod (THA); L 0–5 | Did not advance | | | | |
| Döwlet Muhanow | 60 kg | Jayanath (SRI); L 2–3 | Did not advance | | | | |
| Baýramdurdy Nurmuhammedow | 70 kg | Abdalla (BHR); L 1–4 | Did not advance | | | | |
| Abdyrahman Yklymow | 80 kg | —N/a | Salimov (TJK); L 0–5 | Did not advance | | | |
| Döwlet Yslamow | +90 kg | —N/a | Koshaliev (KGZ); L 2–3 | Did not advance | | | |

== Esports ==
In total, two Turkmen athletes participated in the esports events – Mergen Charyyev and Muhammetmyrat Mollaekeyev.

== Karate ==
In total, three Turkmen athletes participated in the karate events – Raýan Gurbanmyradow, Daýanç Keletliýew and Dawut Nazmyradow.

Key:

• H - Hantei (Decision) • S - Senshu (Advantage)

| Athlete | Event | Round of 32 | Round of 16 | Quarterfinals | Semifinals | Repechage | Final / BM | |
| Athlete | Event | Opposition Result | Opposition Result | Opposition Result | Opposition Result | Opposition Result | Opposition Result | Rank |
|---|---|---|---|---|---|---|---|---|
| Raýan Gurbanmyradow | Men's –60 kg | —N/a | Lachica (PHI); W 6–1 | Sureeya Sankar (MAS); L 2–3 | Did not advance | | | 9 |
| Daýanç Keletliýew | Men's –67 kg | Cheng H.P. (HKG) (S) L 2–2 | Did not advance | | | | | 19 |
| Dawut Nazmyradow | Men's –75 kg | —N/a | Bye | Nurlanov (KGZ); W 7–2 | Almarjeh (SYR) (H) W 0–0 | —N/a | Nemati (IRI); L 3–4 | (silver) |

== Kurash ==
In total, six Turkmen athletes participated in the kurash events – Ahmet Çaryýew, Nurana Hezretowa, Humaý Jumardudýewa, Sabina Kadyrowa, Hydyr Muhammadow and Ylýas Muhammedow.

== Swimming ==
In total, three Turkmen athletes participated in the swimming events – David Akopyan, Valeriya Mirenskaya and Alan Muhin.

| Athlete | Event | Heat | | Final | |
| Athlete | Event | Time | Rank | Time | Rank |
|---|---|---|---|---|---|
| Alan Muhin | Men's 50 m freestyle | 23.91 | 29 | Did not advance | |
| Alan Muhin | Men's 100 m freestyle | 53.69 | 34 | Did not advance | |
| Alan Muhin | Men's 50 m butterfly | 26.17 | 35 | Did not advance | |
| David Akopyan | Men's 50 m breaststroke | 29.28 | 29 | Did not advance | |
| David Akopyan | Men's 100 m breaststroke | 1:04.72 | 26 | Did not advance | |
| David Akopyan | Men's 50 m butterfly | 24.89 | 22 | Did not advance | |
| David Akopyan | Men's 100 m butterfly | 56.26 | 26 | Did not advance | |
| Valeriya Mirenskaya | Women's 50 m freestyle | 29.11 | 28 | Did not advance | |
| Valeriya Mirenskaya | Women's 100 m freestyle | 1:03.50 | 29 | Did not advance | |
| Valeriya Mirenskaya | Women's 50 m butterfly | 29.11 | 28 | Did not advance | |
| Valeriya Mirenskaya | Women's 200 m individual medley | 2:43.30 | 21 | Did not advance | |

== Weightlifting ==
In total, four Turkmen athletes participated in the weightlifting events – Ogulşat Amanowa, Şahzadbek Matýakubow, Bektimur Reýimow and Anamjan Rustamowa.

| Athlete | Event | Snatch | | Clean & Jerk | | Total | Rank |
| Athlete | Event | Result | Rank | Result | Rank | Total | Rank |
|---|---|---|---|---|---|---|---|
| Bektimur Reýimow | Men's −75 kg | 155 | 4 | 182 | 4 | 337 | 5 |
| Şahzadbek Matýakubow | Men's −110 kg | 188 | 2 | 222 | 3 | 410 | (silver) |
| Ogulşat Amanowa | Women's −53 kg | 88 | 8 | 103 | 9 | 191 | 9 |
| Anamjan Rustamowa | Women's −86 kg | 116 | 3 | 142 | 4 | 258 | 4 |

== Wrestling ==
In total, six Turkmen athletes participated in the wrestling events – Azatjan Açilow, Aslan Agadadaýew, Amanberdi Agamämmedow, Alp Arslan Begenjow, Şatlyk Hemelýäýew and Zyyamuhammet Saparow.

== Wushu ==
In total, five Turkmen athletes participated in the wushu events – Bibimeryem Akmuhammedowa, Baýrammyrat Annamyradow, Merjen Joraýewa, Muhammet Jumamyradow and Hezret Öwezgeldiýew.

| Athlete | Event | Round of 32 | Round of 16 | Quarterfinals | Semifinals | Final | |
| Athlete | Event | Opposition Score | Opposition Score | Opposition Score | Opposition Score | Opposition Score | Rank |
|---|---|---|---|---|---|---|---|
| Baýrammyrat Annamyradow | Men's –60 kg | —N/a | Bye | Guitara (INA); L WPD | Did not advance | | |
| Hezret Öwezgeldiýew | Men's –65 kg | Bye | Panahigelehkolaei (IRI); L 0–2 | Did not advance | | | |
| Muhammet Jumamyradow | Men's –75 kg | —N/a | Zhang H-y (TPE); L 0–2 | Did not advance | | | |
| Bibimeryem Akmuhammedowa | Women's –52 kg | —N/a | Tursyn (KAZ); L 0–2 | Did not advance | | | |
| Merjen Joraýewa | Women's –60 kg | —N/a | Thakulla (NEP); W 2–0 | Nguyễn T.T.T. (VIE); L WPD | Did not advance | | |
