= 2023 Asian Youth & Junior Weightlifting Championships =

- Host city: Delhi, India
- Dates: 28 July-5 August
- Main venue: Gautam Buddha University

The 2023 Asian Youth & Junior Weightlifting Championships were held at Delhi, India from 28 July to 5 August.

== Medal summary ==
=== Junior men's ===
Event	Gold		Silver		Bronze	
55 kg
Snatch	Đỗ Tú Tùng; Vietnam	115 kg	Dương Tuấn Kiệt; Vietnam	109 kg	Mukund Santosh Aher; India	108 kg
Clean & Jerk	Đỗ Tú Tùng; Vietnam	145 kg	Mukund Santosh Aher; India	137 kg	Dương Tuấn Kiệt; Vietnam	135 kg
Total	Đỗ Tú Tùng; Vietnam	260 kg	Mukund Santosh Aher; India	245 kg	Dương Tuấn Kiệt; Vietnam	244 kg
61 kg
Snatch	A Tiêu; Vietnam	120 kg AYR	Siddhanta Gogoi; India	116 kg	Lapung Sankar; India	114 kg
Clean & Jerk	Siddhanta Gogoi; India	149 kg	Albert Delos Santos; Philippines	148 kg	Perhat Bagtyýarow; Turkmenistan	144 kg
Total	Siddhanta Gogoi; India	265 kg	Albert Delos Santos; Philippines	258 kg	Lapung Sankar; India	256 kg
67 kg
Snatch	Khusinboy Matrasulov; Uzbekistan	138 kg	Trần Minh Trí; Vietnam	131 kg	Madhavan Thirumurugan; India	128 kg
Clean & Jerk	Trần Minh Trí; Vietnam	168 kg	Diyorbek Ruzmetov; Uzbekistan	160 kg	Khusinboy Matrasulov; Uzbekistan	160 kg
Total	Trần Minh Trí; Vietnam	299 kg	Khusinboy Matrasulov; Uzbekistan	298 kg	Diyorbek Ruzmetov; Uzbekistan	288 kg
73 kg
Snatch	Worrapot Nasuriwong; Thailand	136 kg	Abdulaziz Alimjanov; Uzbekistan	133 kg	Hemant Pal; Nepal	97 kg
Clean & Jerk	Worrapot Nasuriwong; Thailand	171 kg	Abdulaziz Alimjanov; Uzbekistan	160 kg	Hemant Pal; Nepal	110 kg
Total	Worrapot Nasuriwong; Thailand	307 kg	Abdulaziz Alimjanov; Uzbekistan	293 kg	Hemant Pal; Nepal	207 kg
81 kg
Snatch	Nursultan Esbergenov; Uzbekistan	154 kg	Gaýgysyz Töräýew; Turkmenistan	147 kg	Abdollah Beiranvand; Iran	145 kg
Clean & Jerk	Gaýgysyz Töräýew; Turkmenistan	178 kg	Nursultan Esbergenov; Uzbekistan	178 kg	Abdollah Beiranvand; Iran	175 kg
Total	Nursultan Esbergenov; Uzbekistan	332 kg	Gaýgysyz Töräýew; Turkmenistan	325 kg	Abdollah Beiranvand; Iran	320 kg
89 kg
Snatch	Khojiakbar Olimov; Uzbekistan	155 kg	Resul Rejepow; Turkmenistan	148 kg	Nursultan Tarmalov; Kyrgyzstan	147 kg
Clean & Jerk	Khojiakbar Olimov; Uzbekistan	180 kg	Farhad Gholozadeh; Iran	174 kg	Resul Rejepow; Turkmenistan	170 kg
Total	Khojiakbar Olimov; Uzbekistan	335 kg	Resul Rejepow; Turkmenistan	318 kg	Farhad Gholozadeh; Iran	317 kg
96 kg
Snatch	Shahzadbek Matyakubov; Turkmenistan	160 kg	Alireza Nassiri; Iran	156 kg	Cha Byung-jun; South Korea	147 kg
Clean & Jerk	Shahzadbek Matyakubov; Turkmenistan	197 kg	Alireza Nassiri; Iran	196 kg	Asem Al-Sallaj; Jordan	180 kg
Total	Shahzadbek Matyakubov; Turkmenistan	357 kg	Alireza Nassiri; Iran	352 kg	Asem Al-Sallaj; Jordan	325 kg
102 kg
Snatch	Abolfazl Zare; Iran	158 kg	Jeong Hui-jun; South Korea	155 kg	Mirjahon Yusupov; Uzbekistan	143 kg
Clean & Jerk	Jeong Hui-jun; South Korea	195 kg	Abolfazl Zare; Iran	190 kg	Lin Jui-li; Chinese Taipei	176 kg
Total	Jeong Hui-jun; South Korea	350 kg	Abolfazl Zare; Iran	348 kg	Lin Jui-li; Chinese Taipei	318 kg
109 kg
Snatch	Kurbonmurod Nomozov; Uzbekistan	160 kg	Hassan Emadi; Iran	158 kg	Kourosh Zare; Iran	157 kg
Clean & Jerk	Kurbonmurod Nomozov; Uzbekistan	200 kg	Kourosh Zare; Iran	192 kg	Ma Ching-chieh; Chinese Taipei	190 kg
Total	Kurbonmurod Nomozov; Uzbekistan	360 kg	Kourosh Zare; Iran	349 kg	Ma Ching-chieh; Chinese Taipei	345 kg
+109 kg
Snatch	Alireza Esfandiari; Iran	177 kg	Taha Nematimoghaddam; Iran	166 kg	Amir Abdullaev; Uzbekistan	157 kg
Clean & Jerk	Nam Ji-yong; South Korea	213 kg	Alireza Esfandiari; Iran	207 kg	Taha Nematimoghaddam; Iran	200 kg
Total	Alireza Esfandiari; Iran	384 kg	Nam Ji-yong; South Korea	369 kg	Taha Nematimoghaddam; Iran	366 kg

=== Junior women's ===
Event	Gold		Silver		Bronze	
45 kg
Snatch	Angeline Colonia; Philippines	70 kg	Rose Jean Ramos; Philippines	70 kg	Khemika Kamnoedsri; Thailand	67 kg
Clean & Jerk	Trần Thị Bắc Giang; Vietnam	88 kg	Rose Jean Ramos; Philippines	87 kg	Khemika Kamnoedsri; Thailand	84 kg
Total	Rose Jean Ramos; Philippines	157 kg	Trần Thị Bắc Giang; Vietnam	154 kg	Angeline Colonia; Philippines	152 kg
49 kg
Snatch	Rosegie Ramos; Philippines	83 kg	Gyaneshwari Yadav; India	78 kg	Nguyễn Bích Trâm; Vietnam	76 kg
Clean & Jerk	Rosegie Ramos; Philippines	99 kg	Gyaneshwari Yadav; India	97 kg	Huang Yi-chen; Chinese Taipei	95 kg
Total	Rosegie Ramos; Philippines	182 kg	Gyaneshwari Yadav; India	175 kg	Nguyễn Bích Trâm; Vietnam	169 kg
55 kg
Snatch	Chen Guan-ling; Chinese Taipei	83 kg	Nigora Abdullaeva; Uzbekistan	80 kg	Hoàng Kim Lụa; Vietnam	79 kg
Clean & Jerk	Chen Guan-ling; Chinese Taipei	112 kg	Nigora Abdullaeva; Uzbekistan	101 kg	Usha Usha; India	100 kg
Total	Chen Guan-ling; Chinese Taipei	195 kg	Nigora Abdullaeva; Uzbekistan	181 kg	Hoàng Kim Lụa; Vietnam	176 kg
59 kg
Snatch	Hà Thị Xiên; Vietnam	85 kg	Han Ji-hye; South Korea	84 kg	Reihaneh Karimi; Iran	81 kg
Clean & Jerk	Han Ji-hye; South Korea	109 kg	Reihaneh Karimi; Iran	107 kg	Pawanrat Chatkaew; Thailand	106 kg
Total	Han Ji-hye; South Korea	193 kg	Hà Thị Xiên; Vietnam	190 kg	Reihaneh Karimi; Iran	188 kg
64 kg
Snatch	Sanapathi Pallavi; India	87 kg	Fatemeh Keshafarz; Iran	86 kg	Madinabonu Djuraeva; Uzbekistan	85 kg
Clean & Jerk	Fatemeh Keshafarz; Iran	111 kg	Sanapathi Pallavi; India	109 kg	Madinabonu Djuraeva; Uzbekistan	105 kg
Total	Fatemeh Keshafarz; Iran	197 kg	Sanapathi Pallavi; India	196 kg	Madinabonu Djuraeva; Uzbekistan	190 kg
71 kg
Snatch	Vanessa Sarno; Philippines	95 kg	Phattharathida Wongsing; Thailand	92 kg	Sevinchoy Komilova; Uzbekistan	88 kg
Clean & Jerk	Vanessa Sarno; Philippines	121 kg	Phattharathida Wongsing; Thailand	120 kg	Mashkhura Rustamova; Uzbekistan	110 kg
Total	Vanessa Sarno; Philippines	216 kg	Phattharathida Wongsing; Thailand	212 kg	Sevinchoy Komilova; Uzbekistan	198 kg
76 kg
Snatch	Park Su-min; South Korea	99 kg	Madina Fayzullaeva; Uzbekistan	89 kg	Gulshodakhon Dadamirzaeva; Uzbekistan	89 kg
Clean & Jerk	Park Su-min; South Korea	118 kg	Sanjana; India	112 kg	Madina Fayzullaeva; Uzbekistan	111 kg
Total	Park Su-min; South Korea	217 kg	Madina Fayzullaeva; Uzbekistan	200 kg	Gulshodakhon Dadamirzaeva; Uzbekistan	198 kg
81 kg
Snatch	Anamjan Rustamowa; Turkmenistan	103 kg	Nigora Suvonova; Uzbekistan	90 kg	Wang Hsin-hsiu; Chinese Taipei	89 kg
Clean & Jerk	Anamjan Rustamowa; Turkmenistan	125 kg	Nigora Suvonova; Uzbekistan	116 kg	Anjana Sreejith; India	108 kg
Total	Anamjan Rustamowa; Turkmenistan	228 kg	Nigora Suvonova; Uzbekistan	206 kg	Wang Hsin-hsiu; Chinese Taipei	194 kg
87 kg
Snatch	Kim Su-a; South Korea	92 kg	Boonyapat Boonchauy; Thailand	91 kg	Kizhan Maghsoodi; Iran	88 kg
Clean & Jerk	Kim Su-a; South Korea	120 kg	Kizhan Maghsoodi; Iran	116 kg	Boonyapat Boonchauy; Thailand	112 kg
Total	Kim Su-a; South Korea	212 kg	Kizhan Maghsoodi; Iran	204 kg	Boonyapat Boonchauy; Thailand	203 kg
+87 kg
Snatch	Kim Hyo-eon; South Korea	109 kg	Wang Ling-chen; Chinese Taipei	108 kg	Trần Thị Hiền; Vietnam	100 kg
Clean & Jerk	Kim Hyo-eon; South Korea	141 kg	Wang Ling-chen; Chinese Taipei	140 kg	Trần Thị Hiền; Vietnam	124 kg
Total	Kim Hyo-eon; South Korea	250 kg	Wang Ling-chen; Chinese Taipei	248 kg	Trần Thị Hiền; Vietnam	224 kg

=== Youth men's ===
Event	Gold		Silver		Bronze	
49 kg
Snatch	Prince Delos Santos; Philippines	94 kg	Bùi Minh Đạo; Vietnam	93 kg	Eron Borres; Philippines	91 kg
Clean & Jerk	Eron Borres; Philippines	119 kg	Bùi Minh Đạo; Vietnam	116 kg	Prince Delos Santos; Philippines	116 kg
Total	Prince Delos Santos; Philippines	210 kg	Eron Borres; Philippines	210 kg	Bùi Minh Đạo; Vietnam	209 kg
55 kg
Snatch	K'Dương; Vietnam	105 kg	Gurunaidu Sanapathi; India	104 kg	N Tomchou Meetei; India	103 kg
Clean & Jerk	K'Dương; Vietnam	135 kg	Miraziz Mirsobirov; Uzbekistan	125 kg	N Tomchou Meetei; India	125 kg
Total	K'Dương; Vietnam	240 kg	Gurunaidu Sanapathi; India	229 kg	N Tomchou Meetei; India	228 kg
61 kg
Snatch	A Tiêu; Vietnam	120 kg AYR	Perhat Bagtyýarow; Turkmenistan	112 kg	Azizbek Shomurodov; Uzbekistan	111 kg
Clean & Jerk	Albert Delos Santos; Philippines	148 kg	Perhat Bagtyýarow; Turkmenistan	144 kg	Azizbek Shomurodov; Uzbekistan	142 kg
Total	Albert Delos Santos; Philippines	258 kg	Perhat Bagtyýarow; Turkmenistan	256 kg	Azizbek Shomurodov; Uzbekistan	253 kg
67 kg
Snatch	Bedabrat Bharali; India	124 kg	Nurillo Davlatboev; Uzbekistan	123 kg	Mohammed Al-Ani; Syria	118 kg
Clean & Jerk	Nurillo Davlatboev; Uzbekistan	149 kg	Bedabrat Bharali; India	149 kg	A Tân; Vietnam	140 kg
Total	Bedabrat Bharali; India	273 kg	Nurillo Davlatboev; Uzbekistan	272 kg	A Tân; Vietnam	257 kg
73 kg
Snatch	Khikmatullo Khaydarov; Uzbekistan	127 kg	Krishna Venkata; India	120 kg	Isroilbek Ismoilov; Uzbekistan	116 kg
Clean & Jerk	Khikmatullo Khaydarov; Uzbekistan	160 kg	Krishna Venkata; India	151 kg	Isroilbek Ismoilov; Uzbekistan	148 kg
Total	Khikmatullo Khaydarov; Uzbekistan	287 kg	Krishna Venkata; India	271 kg	Isroilbek Ismoilov; Uzbekistan	264 kg
81 kg
Snatch	Diyorbek Ermatov; Uzbekistan	145 kg	Iliya Salehipour; Iran	140 kg	Mohamad Al-Kateb; Syria	133 kg
Clean & Jerk	Diyorbek Ermatov; Uzbekistan	174 kg	Iliya Salehipour; Iran	173 kg	Mohamad Al-Kateb; Syria	160 kg
Total	Diyorbek Ermatov; Uzbekistan	319 kg	Iliya Salehipour; Iran	313 kg	Mohamad Al-Kateb; Syria	293 kg
89 kg
Snatch	Amirmohammad Soleimanihazan; Iran	144 kg	Farhad Gholizadeh; Iran	143 kg	Ummatillo Rustambekov; Uzbekistan	137 kg
Clean & Jerk	Farhad Gholizadeh; Iran	174 kg	Ummatillo Rustambekov; Uzbekistan	168 kg	Amirmohammad Soleimanihazan; Iran	164 kg
Total	Farhad Gholizadeh; Iran	317 kg	Amirmohammad Soleimanihazan; Iran	308 kg	Ummatillo Rustambekov; Uzbekistan	305 kg
96 kg
Snatch	Batirbek Parakhatov; Uzbekistan	143 kg	Farukh Shokirzhanov; Kyrgyzstan	140 kg	Dawood Al-Lami Ali Hazim; Iraq	134 kg
Clean & Jerk	Batirbek Parakhatov; Uzbekistan	175 kg	Hamidreza Zarei; Iran	174 kg	Dawood Al-Lami Ali Hazim; Iraq	171 kg
Total	Batirbek Parakhatov; Uzbekistan	318 kg	Farukh Shokirzhanov; Kyrgyzstan	307 kg	Hamidreza Zarei; Iran	306 kg
102 kg
Snatch	Abolfazl Zare; Iran	158 kg	Abolfazl Kiani Shahvandi; Iran	141 kg	Sonowal Kapil; India	125 kg
Clean & Jerk	Abolfazl Zare; Iran	190 kg	Abolfazl Kiani Shahvandi; Iran	177 kg	Uulu Erbol Ermek; Kyrgyzstan	156 kg
Total	Abolfazl Zare; Iran	348 kg	Abolfazl Kiani Shahvandi; Iran	318 kg	Sonowal Kapil; India	276 kg
+102 kg
Snatch	Taha Nematimoghaddam; Iran	166 kg	Hamidreza Mohammaditanha; Iran	158 kg	Ali Mohammad; Syria	143 kg
Clean & Jerk	Taha Nematimoghaddam; Iran	200 kg	Hamidreza Mohammaditanha; Iran	192 kg	Wang Yu-cheng; Chinese Taipei	171 kg
Total	Taha Nematimoghaddam; Iran	366 kg	Hamidreza Mohammaditanha; Iran	350 kg	Wang Yu-cheng; Chinese Taipei	313 kg

=== Youth women's ===
Event	Gold		Silver		Bronze	
40 kg
Snatch	Alexsandra Diaz; Philippines	57 kg	Nguyễn Phương Linh; Vietnam	56 kg	Jyoshna Sabar; India	55 kg
Clean & Jerk	Nguyễn Phương Linh; Vietnam	68 kg	Alexsandra Diaz; Philippines	66 kg	Jyoshna Sabar; India	64 kg
Total	Nguyễn Phương Linh; Vietnam	124 kg	Alexsandra Diaz; Philippines	123 kg	Jyoshna Sabar; India	119 kg
45 kg
Snatch	Angeline Colonia; Philippines	70 kg	Nguyễn Thị Hoài; Vietnam	67 kg	Ogulşat Amanowa; Turkmenistan	65 kg
Clean & Jerk	Nguyễn Thị Hoài; Vietnam	84 kg	Angeline Colonia; Philippines	82 kg	Ogulşat Amanowa; Turkmenistan	80 kg
Total	Angeline Colonia; Philippines	152 kg	Nguyễn Thị Hoài; Vietnam	151 kg	Ogulşat Amanowa; Turkmenistan	145 kg
49 kg
Snatch	Jhodie Peralta; Philippines	73 kg	Bar Koyel; India	69 kg	Phanida Denduang; Thailand	67 kg
Clean & Jerk	Jhodie Peralta; Philippines	87 kg	Bar Koyel; India	86 kg	Phanida Denduang; Thailand	84 kg
Total	Jhodie Peralta; Philippines	160 kg	Bar Koyel; India	155 kg	Phanida Denduang; Thailand	151 kg
55 kg
Snatch	Ziyoda Khudoykulova; Uzbekistan	78 kg	Natcha Kaewnoi; Thailand	76 kg	Rosalinda Faustino; Philippines	75 kg
Clean & Jerk	Natcha Kaewnoi; Thailand	100 kg	Rosalinda Faustino; Philippines	97 kg	Ziyoda Khudoykulova; Uzbekistan	98 kg
Total	Natcha Kaewnoi; Thailand	176 kg	Rosalinda Faustino; Philippines	172 kg	Ziyoda Khudoykulova; Uzbekistan	166 kg
59 kg
Snatch	Kanittha Saetang; Thailand	81 kg	Seyedehghazal Hosseini; Iran	80 kg	Lyudmila Elefteriadi; Uzbekistan	79 kg
Clean & Jerk	Bellana Harika; India	98 kg	Lyudmila Elefteriadi; Uzbekistan	98 kg	Kanittha Saetang; Thailand	95 kg
Total	Lyudmila Elefteriadi; Uzbekistan	177 kg	Kanittha Saetang; Thailand	176 kg	Bellana Harika; India	176 kg
64 kg
Snatch	Seyedehghazaleh Hosseini; Iran	81 kg	Gülälek Kakamyradowa; Turkmenistan	79 kg	Asalkhon Rajabova; Uzbekistan	77 kg
Clean & Jerk	Seyedehghazaleh Hosseini; Iran	101 kg	Hanieh Sharifi Sedeh; Iran	100 kg	Gülälek Kakamyradowa; Turkmenistan	96 kg
Total	Seyedehghazaleh Hosseini; Iran	185 kg	Gülälek Kakamyradowa; Turkmenistan	175 kg	Hanieh Sharifi Sedeh; Iran	172 kg
71 kg
Snatch	Phattharathida Wongsing; Thailand	92 kg	Laya Karimi; Iran	83 kg	Dilnoza Fayzullaeva; Uzbekistan	76 kg
Clean & Jerk	Phattharathida Wongsing; Thailand	120 kg	Dilnoza Fayzullaeva; Uzbekistan	93 kg	Laya Karimi; Iran	91 kg
Total	Phattharathida Wongsing; Thailand	212 kg	Laya Karimi; Iran	174 kg	Dilnoza Fayzullaeva; Uzbekistan	169 kg
76 kg
Snatch	Madina Fayzullaeva; Uzbekistan	89 kg	Sanjana; India	86 kg	Asal Kadkhodaei; Iran	78 kg
Clean & Jerk	Sanjana; India	112 kg	Madina Fayzullaeva; Uzbekistan	111 kg	Chiang Sin-yueh; Chinese Taipei	97 kg
Total	Madina Fayzullaeva; Uzbekistan	200 kg	Sanjana; India	198 kg	Asal Kadkhodaei; Iran	174 kg
81 kg
Snatch	Anamjan Rustamowa; Turkmenistan	103 kg	Chen Ko-ko; Chinese Taipei	78 kg	Layan Al-Qurashi; Saudi Arabia	60 kg
Clean & Jerk	Anamjan Rustamowa; Turkmenistan	125 kg	Chen Ko-ko; Chinese Taipei	100 kg	Layan Al-Qurashi; Saudi Arabia	68 kg
Total	Anamjan Rustamowa; Turkmenistan	228 kg	Chen Ko-ko; Chinese Taipei	178 kg	Layan Al-Qurashi; Saudi Arabia	128 kg
+81 kg
Snatch	Trần Thị Hiền; Vietnam	100 kg	Martina Maibam; India	95 kg	Nguyễn Ánh Như; Vietnam	86 kg
Clean & Jerk	Trần Thị Hiền; Vietnam	124 kg	Martina Maibam; India	123 kg	Lolakhona Abdurashidova; Uzbekistan	110 kg
Total	Trần Thị Hiền; Vietnam	224 kg	Martina Maibam; India	218 kg	Lolakhona Abdurashidova; Uzbekistan	193 kg

== Medal table ==
=== Junior ===
Ranking by Big (Total result) medals

* Host nation (India)

Rank	Nation	Gold	Silver	Bronze	Total
1	South Korea	5	1	0	6
2	Uzbekistan	3	5	4	12
3	Philippines	3	1	1	5
4	Iran	2	4	4	10
5	Vietnam	2	2	4	8
6	Turkmenistan	2	2	0	4
7	India*	1	3	1	5
8	Chinese Taipei	1	1	3	5
9	Thailand	1	1	1	3
10	Jordan	0	0	1	1
10	Nepal	0	0	1	1
Totals (11 entries)		20	20	20	60

Ranking by all medals: Big (Total result) and Small (Snatch and Clean & Jerk)

* Host nation (India)

Rank	Nation	Gold	Silver	Bronze	Total
1	South Korea	14	3	1	18
2	Uzbekistan	9	14	13	36
3	Vietnam	8	4	9	21
4	Philippines	8	4	1	13
5	Turkmenistan	7	4	2	13
6	Iran	5	15	10	30
7	India*	3	9	6	18
8	Thailand	3	4	5	12
9	Chinese Taipei	3	3	7	13
10	Nepal	0	0	3	3
11	Jordan	0	0	2	2
12	Kyrgyzstan	0	0	1	1
Totals (12 entries)		60	60	60	180

=== Youth ===
Ranking by Big (Total result) medals

* Host nation (India)

Rank	Nation	Gold	Silver	Bronze	Total
1	Uzbekistan	5	1	6	12
2	Iran	4	5	3	12
3	Philippines	4	3	0	7
4	Vietnam	3	1	2	6
5	Thailand	2	1	1	4
6	India*	1	5	4	10
7	Turkmenistan	1	2	1	4
8	Chinese Taipei	0	1	1	2
9	Kyrgyzstan	0	1	0	1
10	Saudi Arabia	0	0	1	1
10	Syria	0	0	1	1
Totals (11 entries)		20	20	20	60

Ranking by all medals: Big (Total result) and Small (Snatch and Clean & Jerk)

* Host nation (India)

Rank	Nation	Gold	Silver	Bronze	Total
1	Uzbekistan	14	7	16	37
2	Iran	12	16	6	34
3	Philippines	11	6	3	20
4	Vietnam	10	5	4	19
5	Thailand	6	2	4	12
6	India*	4	14	9	27
7	Turkmenistan	3	5	4	12
8	Chinese Taipei	0	3	3	6
9	Kyrgyzstan	0	2	1	3
10	Syria	0	0	4	4
11	Iraq	0	0	3	3
11	Saudi Arabia	0	0	3	3
Totals (12 entries)		60	60	60	180

== Team ranking ==
=== Junior ===
==== Men ====
Rank	Team	Points
1	Uzbekistan	729
2	Iran	708
3	India	599
4	Vietnam	358
5	Chinese Taipei	314
6	Turkmenistan	301

==== Women ====
Rank	Team	Points
1	Uzbekistan	671
2	India	665
3	Vietnam	559
4	Iran	531
5	Thailand	405
6	Philippines	380

=== Youth ===
==== Men ====
Rank	Team	Points
1	Iran	741
2	Uzbekistan	732
3	India	672
4	Vietnam	317
5	Turkmenistan	317
6	Kyrgyzstan	306

==== Women ====
Rank	Team	Points
1	India	690
2	Uzbekistan	688
3	Iran	488
4	Vietnam	429
5	Philippines	316
6	Thailand	310

== Participating nations ==
=== Junior ===
- Chinese Taipei (10)
- India (20) Host
- Iran (18)
- Iraq (3)
- Japan (2)
- Jordan (2)
- Kuwait (1)
- Kyrgyzstan (2)
- Lebanon (1)
- Nepal (2)
- Philippines (7)
- Saudi Arabia (6)
- South Korea (8)
- Syria (3)
- Thailand (10)
- Turkmenistan (6)
- Uzbekistan (20)
- Vietnam (15)

=== Youth ===
- Chinese Taipei (9)
- India (20) Host
- Iran (17)
- Iraq (4)
- Jordan (1)
- Kuwait (1)
- Kyrgyzstan (6)
- Lebanon (1)
- Nepal (2)
- Philippines (8)
- Saudi Arabia (4)
- Syria (3)
- Thailand (7)
- Turkmenistan (8)
- Uzbekistan (20)
- Vietnam (12)

== Junior men's results ==
=== 55 kg ===
Rank	Athlete	Group	Snatch (kg)				Clean & Jerk (kg)				Total
Rank	Athlete	Group	1	2	3	Rank	1	2	3	Rank	Total
1st place, gold medalist(s)	Đỗ Tú Tùng (VIE)	A	110	115	~~118~~	1st place, gold medalist(s)	138	145	~~149~~	1st place, gold medalist(s)	260
2nd place, silver medalist(s)	Mukund Santosh Aher (IND)	A	103	108	~~111~~	3rd place, bronze medalist(s)	127	132	137	2nd place, silver medalist(s)	245
3rd place, bronze medalist(s)	Dương Tuấn Kiệt (VIE)	A	104	109	~~111~~	2nd place, silver medalist(s)	~~135~~	~~135~~	~~135~~	3rd place, bronze medalist(s)	244
4	Fahad Alotaibi (KUW)	A	~~71~~	71	~~77~~	4	91	96	101	4	177

=== 61 kg ===
Rank	Athlete	Group	Snatch (kg)				Clean & Jerk (kg)				Total
Rank	Athlete	Group	1	2	3	Rank	1	2	3	Rank	Total
1st place, gold medalist(s)	Siddhanta Gogoi (IND)	A	110	114	116	2nd place, silver medalist(s)	142	146	149	1st place, gold medalist(s)	265
2nd place, silver medalist(s)	Albert Delos Santos (PHI)	A	105	110	~~112~~	6	145	148	~~150~~	2nd place, silver medalist(s)	258
3rd place, bronze medalist(s)	Lapung Sankar (IND)	A	107	111	114	3rd place, bronze medalist(s)	139	142	~~145~~	4	256
4	Perhat Bagtyýarow (TKM)	A	112	~~115~~	~~115~~	5	141	144	~~146~~	3rd place, bronze medalist(s)	256
5	Patsaphong Thongsuk (THA)	A	108	~~113~~	113	4	~~142~~	142	~~147~~	5	255
6	A Tiêu (VIE)	A	112	116	120	1st place, gold medalist(s)	~~132~~	132	~~140~~	7	252
7	Mehrab Davasari (IRI)	B	102	107	~~110~~	7	134	~~138~~	138	6	245
8	Mohammad Tarha (LBN)	B	97	~~102~~	~~102~~	8	122	~~127~~	~~128~~	8	219
—	K'Brừm (VIE)	A	~~110~~	—	—	—	—	—	—	—	—

=== 67 kg ===
Rank	Athlete	Group	Snatch (kg)				Clean & Jerk (kg)				Total
Rank	Athlete	Group	1	2	3	Rank	1	2	3	Rank	Total
1st place, gold medalist(s)	Trần Minh Trí (VIE)	A	131	~~135~~	~~135~~	2nd place, silver medalist(s)	161	168	—	1st place, gold medalist(s)	299
2nd place, silver medalist(s)	Khusinboy Matrasulov (UZB)	A	130	134	138	1st place, gold medalist(s)	151	156	160	3rd place, bronze medalist(s)	298
3rd place, bronze medalist(s)	Diyorbek Ruzmetov (UZB)	A	~~127~~	~~127~~	128	4	156	160	~~165~~	2nd place, silver medalist(s)	288
4	Madhavan Thirumurugan (IND)	A	125	128	~~131~~	3rd place, bronze medalist(s)	142	150	155	5	283
5	Yang Fan-shun (TPE)	A	~~125~~	125	~~128~~	6	150	153	156	4	281
6	Tario Markio (IND)	A	~~120~~	~~120~~	120	7	~~153~~	153	~~161~~	6	273
7	A Tân (VIE)	B	~~116~~	117	~~119~~	9	130	137	140	7	257
8	Ibrahim Mohammed Al-Ani (IRQ)	B	115	~~118~~	118	8	136	~~139~~	~~139~~	8	254
9	Mohammed Al-Zawri (KSA)	B	106	111	113	10	~~135~~	135	~~138~~	9	248
10	Elzar Taiirov (KGZ)	B	112	~~117~~	~~117~~	11	130	~~135~~	~~135~~	10	242
—	Christian Rodriguez (PHI)	B	~~105~~	~~105~~	~~105~~	—	~~137~~	~~138~~	~~138~~	—	—
—	Kitsada Wongsa (THA)	A	~~122~~	122	126	5	~~160~~	~~160~~	~~161~~	—	—

=== 73 kg ===
Rank	Athlete	Group	Snatch (kg)				Clean & Jerk (kg)				Total
Rank	Athlete	Group	1	2	3	Rank	1	2	3	Rank	Total
1st place, gold medalist(s)	Worrapot Nasuriwong (THA)	A	130	134	136	1st place, gold medalist(s)	161	166	171	1st place, gold medalist(s)	307
2nd place, silver medalist(s)	Abdulaziz Alimjanov (UZB)	A	127	133	~~136~~	2nd place, silver medalist(s)	155	160	~~171~~	2nd place, silver medalist(s)	293
3rd place, bronze medalist(s)	Hemant Pal (NEP)	A	85	92	97	3rd place, bronze medalist(s)	~~110~~	110	~~120~~	3rd place, bronze medalist(s)	207

=== 81 kg ===
Rank	Athlete	Group	Snatch (kg)				Clean & Jerk (kg)				Total
Rank	Athlete	Group	1	2	3	Rank	1	2	3	Rank	Total
1st place, gold medalist(s)	Nursultan Esbergenov (UZB)	A	145	150	154	1st place, gold medalist(s)	~~177~~	~~178~~	178	2nd place, silver medalist(s)	332
2nd place, silver medalist(s)	Gaýgysyz Töräýew (TKM)	A	140	144	147	2nd place, silver medalist(s)	178	~~186~~	~~186~~	1st place, gold medalist(s)	325
3rd place, bronze medalist(s)	Abdollah Beiranvand (IRI)	A	145	~~151~~	~~151~~	3rd place, bronze medalist(s)	167	175	~~179~~	3rd place, bronze medalist(s)	320
4	Iliya Salehipour (IRI)	A	135	140	~~146~~	5	166	173	~~180~~	4	313
5	Valluri Ajaya Babu (IND)	A	138	~~142~~	142	4	160	~~165~~	168	5	310
6	Mohamad Al-Kateb (SYR)	A	129	133	~~138~~	7	156	160	~~167~~	6	293
7	Piphat Burikham (THA)	A	130	~~137~~	~~137~~	8	~~150~~	150	155	7	285
—	So Ji-seop (KOR)	A	135	~~139~~	~~140~~	6	—	—	—	—	—

=== 89 kg ===
Rank	Athlete	Group	Snatch (kg)				Clean & Jerk (kg)				Total
Rank	Athlete	Group	1	2	3	Rank	1	2	3	Rank	Total
1st place, gold medalist(s)	Khojiakbar Olimov (UZB)	A	150	155	~~158~~	1st place, gold medalist(s)	180	~~194~~	~~195~~	1st place, gold medalist(s)	335
2nd place, silver medalist(s)	Resul Rejepow (TKM)	A	142	146	148	2nd place, silver medalist(s)	165	170	~~173~~	3rd place, bronze medalist(s)	318
3rd place, bronze medalist(s)	Farhad Gholizadeh (IRI)	A	136	143	~~146~~	4	167	~~174~~	174	2nd place, silver medalist(s)	317
4	Nursultan Tarmalov (KGZ)	A	~~143~~	143	147	3rd place, bronze medalist(s)	160	~~166~~	166	4	313
5	Alaa Al-Malahma Hafedh (IRQ)	A	131	~~137~~	~~137~~	7	~~157~~	~~157~~	160	5	291
—	Lal Sk Basheer (IND)	A	129	133	~~137~~	5	~~159~~	~~159~~	~~159~~	—	—
—	Ahmad Shammaa (SYR)	A	~~130~~	130	133	6	~~167~~	~~167~~	~~168~~	—	—

=== 96 kg ===
Rank	Athlete	Group	Snatch (kg)				Clean & Jerk (kg)				Total
Rank	Athlete	Group	1	2	3	Rank	1	2	3	Rank	Total
1st place, gold medalist(s)	Shahzadbek Matyakubov (TKM)	A	155	160	~~165~~	1st place, gold medalist(s)	185	191	197	1st place, gold medalist(s)	357
2nd place, silver medalist(s)	Alireza Nassiri (IRI)	A	146	151	156	2nd place, silver medalist(s)	181	190	196	2nd place, silver medalist(s)	352
3rd place, bronze medalist(s)	Asem Al-Sallaj (JOR)	A	141	145	~~147~~	4	~~176~~	176	180	3rd place, bronze medalist(s)	325
4	Cha Byung-jun (KOR)	A	142	~~147~~	147	3rd place, bronze medalist(s)	170	~~177~~	177	4	324
5	Begis Kenesbaev (UZB)	A	134	~~140~~	140	5	168	~~176~~	~~177~~	7	308
6	Dawood Al-Lami Ali Hazim (IRQ)	B	131	~~134~~	134	6	~~171~~	171	~~175~~	5	305
7	Alok Yadav (IND)	B	118	123	127	9	160	170	~~175~~	6	297
8	Abdullah Al-Ahmad (KSA)	B	118	123	129	8	161	'166	~~172~~	8	295
9	Xu Jin-jia (TPE)	A	125	131	~~135~~	7	150	155	~~160~~	9	286
10	Sanjay Yadav (NEP)	B	90	96	~~101~~	10	115	125	~~130~~	10	221

=== 102 kg ===
Rank	Athlete	Group	Snatch (kg)				Clean & Jerk (kg)				Total
Rank	Athlete	Group	1	2	3	Rank	1	2	3	Rank	Total
1st place, gold medalist(s)	Jeong Hui-jun (KOR)	A	150	155	~~157~~	2nd place, silver medalist(s)	189	195	~~200~~	1st place, gold medalist(s)	350
2nd place, silver medalist(s)	Abolfazi Zare (IRI)	A	150	156	158	1st place, gold medalist(s)	185	190	~~196~~	2nd place, silver medalist(s)	348
3rd place, bronze medalist(s)	Lin Jui-li (TPE)	A	~~135~~	135	142	4	172	~~176~~	176	3rd place, bronze medalist(s)	318
4	Mirjahon Yusupov (UZB)	A	140	143	~~151~~	3rd place, bronze medalist(s)	170	174	~~177~~	4	317

=== 109 kg ===
Rank	Athlete	Group	Snatch (kg)				Clean & Jerk (kg)				Total
Rank	Athlete	Group	1	2	3	Rank	1	2	3	Rank	Total
1st place, gold medalist(s)	Kurbonmurod Nomozov (UZB)	A	156	160	~~164~~	1st place, gold medalist(s)	195	200	~~206~~	1st place, gold medalist(s)	360
2nd place, silver medalist(s)	Kourosh Zare (IRI)	A	152	157	~~161~~	3rd place, bronze medalist(s)	182	187	192	2nd place, silver medalist(s)	349
3rd place, bronze medalist(s)	Ma Ching-chieh (TPE)	A	~~150~~	150	155	4	185	190	~~195~~	3rd place, bronze medalist(s)	345
4	Hassan Emadi (IRI)	A	152	158	~~163~~	2nd place, silver medalist(s)	177	~~184~~	184	5	343
5	Nurbol Abdurashitov (UZB)	A	146	~~151~~	153	5	175	183	186	4	339

=== +109 kg ===
Rank	Athlete	Group	Snatch (kg)				Clean & Jerk (kg)				Total
Rank	Athlete	Group	1	2	3	Rank	1	2	3	Rank	Total
1st place, gold medalist(s)	Alireza Esfandiari (IRI)	A	168	173	177	1st place, gold medalist(s)	201	207	~~212~~	2nd place, silver medalist(s)	384
2nd place, silver medalist(s)	Nam Ji-yong (KOR)	A	~~156~~	156	~~161~~	4	208	213	~~229~~	1st place, gold medalist(s)	369
3rd place, bronze medalist(s)	Taha Nematimoghaddam (IRI)	A	160	166	~~172~~	2nd place, silver medalist(s)	190	200	~~206~~	3rd place, bronze medalist(s)	366
4	Amir Abdullaev (UZB)	A	155	157	~~167~~	3rd place, bronze medalist(s)	180	190	196	4	353
5	Kao Jia-hui (TPE)	A	130	140	~~145~~	6	185	190	~~195~~	5	330
6	Ali Mohammad (SYR)	A	141	143	~~150~~	5	161	~~168~~	169	6	312
7	Paramvir Singh (IND)	A	~~135~~	~~135~~	135	7	158	~~166~~	166	7	301
8	Kesav Bessa (IND)	A	~~125~~	125	131	8	150	156	~~161~~	8	287

== Junior women's results ==
=== 45 kg ===
Rank	Athlete	Group	Snatch (kg)				Clean & Jerk (kg)				Total
Rank	Athlete	Group	1	2	3	Rank	1	2	3	Rank	Total
1st place, gold medalist(s)	Rose Jean Ramos (PHI)	A	~~70~~	70	~~72~~	2nd place, silver medalist(s)	85	87	~~89~~	2nd place, silver medalist(s)	157
2nd place, silver medalist(s)	Trần Thị Bắc Giang (VIE)	A	~~66~~	66	~~68~~	5	85	~~88~~	88	1st place, gold medalist(s)	154
3rd place, bronze medalist(s)	Angeline Colonia (PHI)	A	68	70	~~72~~	1st place, gold medalist(s)	80	82	~~85~~	5	152
4	Khemika Kamnoedsri (THA)	A	64	67	~~71~~	3rd place, bronze medalist(s)	84	~~87~~	~~87~~	3rd place, bronze medalist(s)	151
5	Nguyễn Thị Hoài (VIE)	A	61	~~66~~	67	4	79	81	84	4	151
6	Asmita Dhone (IND)	A	57	~~60~~	60	6	75	78	~~80~~	6	138

=== 49 kg ===
Rank	Athlete	Group	Snatch (kg)				Clean & Jerk (kg)				Total
Rank	Athlete	Group	1	2	3	Rank	1	2	3	Rank	Total
1st place, gold medalist(s)	Rosegie Ramos (PHI)	A	~~80~~	80	83	1st place, gold medalist(s)	96	99	~~101~~	1st place, gold medalist(s)	182
2nd place, silver medalist(s)	Gyaneshwari Yadav (IND)	A	75	~~78~~	78	2nd place, silver medalist(s)	~~93~~	93	97	2nd place, silver medalist(s)	175
3rd place, bronze medalist(s)	Nguyễn Bích Trâm (VIE)	A	72	~~76~~	76	3rd place, bronze medalist(s)	93	~~97~~	~~98~~	4	169
4	Huang Yi-chen (TPE)	A	73	~~75~~	~~76~~	5	~~95~~	95	~~98~~	3rd place, bronze medalist(s)	168
5	Panadda Haengnamchot (THA)	A	67	~~71~~	~~71~~	6	88	91	~~96~~	5	158
6	Anita Feizi (IRI)	B	60	63	~~65~~	7	77	83	~~86~~	6	146
—	Nguyễn Hoài Hương (VIE)	A	~~73~~	74	~~76~~	4	~~94~~	~~94~~	~~94~~	6	—

=== 55 kg ===
Rank	Athlete	Group	Snatch (kg)				Clean & Jerk (kg)				Total
Rank	Athlete	Group	1	2	3	Rank	1	2	3	Rank	Total
1st place, gold medalist(s)	Chen Guan-ling (TPE)	A	~~83~~	83	~~88~~	1st place, gold medalist(s)	103	108	112	1st place, gold medalist(s)	195
2nd place, silver medalist(s)	Nigora Abdullaeva (UZB)	A	77	80	~~84~~	2nd place, silver medalist(s)	98	~~101~~	101	2nd place, silver medalist(s)	181
3rd place, bronze medalist(s)	Hoàng Kim Lụa (VIE)	A	76	~~79~~	79	3rd place, bronze medalist(s)	93	97	~~99~~	6	176
4	Usha Usha (IND)	A	76	~~79~~	~~80~~	5	96	100	~~102~~	3rd place, bronze medalist(s)	176
5	Rosalinda Faustino (PHI)	A	~~75~~	75	~~79~~	6	92	97	~~100~~	5	172
6	Boni Mangkhya (IND)	A	70	73	~~76~~	8	94	99	~~104~~	4	172
7	Yusa Sato (JPN)	A	~~71~~	71	75	7	92	96	~~101~~	7	171
8	Ziyoda Khudoykulova (UZB)	B	71	74	78	4	83	86	88	8	166
9	Hanan Aameri (KSA)	B	~~55~~	55	~~60~~	9	68	73	~~77~~	9	128

=== 59 kg ===
Rank	Athlete	Group	Snatch (kg)				Clean & Jerk (kg)				Total
Rank	Athlete	Group	1	2	3	Rank	1	2	3	Rank	Total
1st place, gold medalist(s)	Han Ji-hye (KOR)	A	82	~~84~~	84	2nd place, silver medalist(s)	103	107	109	1st place, gold medalist(s)	193
2nd place, silver medalist(s)	Hà Thị Xiên (VIE)	A	83	~~85~~	85	1st place, gold medalist(s)	102	~~105~~	105	4	190
3rd place, bronze medalist(s)	Reihaneh Karimi (IRI)	A	~~81~~	81	~~84~~	3rd place, bronze medalist(s)	101	107	~~111~~	2nd place, silver medalist(s)	188
4	Pawanrat Chatkaew (THA)	A	77	~~80~~	~~80~~	6	103	~~106~~	106	3rd place, bronze medalist(s)	183
5	Seyedehghazal Hosseini (IRI)	A	75	80	~~82~~	4	90	~~94~~	94	6	174
6	Sonam Singh (IND)	A	70	75	78	5	90	95	~~99~~	5	173
7	Marjona Abdumutalova (UZB)	A	~~74~~	~~74~~	74	7	90	~~95~~	~~96~~	7	164
8	Hoàng Thị Nhật Hà (VIE)	A	65	~~74~~	~~74~~	8	85	~~91~~	~~91~~	8	150
9	Mutlaq Jear Rafif (KSA)	A	49	~~52~~	53	9	61	66	~~69~~	9	119

=== 64 kg ===
Rank	Athlete	Group	Snatch (kg)				Clean & Jerk (kg)				Total
Rank	Athlete	Group	1	2	3	Rank	1	2	3	Rank	Total
1st place, gold medalist(s)	Fatemeh Keshavarz (IRI)	A	83	86	~~88~~	2nd place, silver medalist(s)	~~105~~	106	111	1st place, gold medalist(s)	197
2nd place, silver medalist(s)	Sanapathi Pallavi (IND)	A	84	~~87~~	87	1st place, gold medalist(s)	102	106	109	2nd place, silver medalist(s)	196
3rd place, bronze medalist(s)	Madinabonu Djuraeva (UZB)	A	80	82	85	3rd place, bronze medalist(s)	98	102	105	3rd place, bronze medalist(s)	190
4	Seyedehghazaleh Hosseini (IRI)	A	78	~~81~~	81	4	96	101	~~105~~	4	182
5	Gülälek Kakamyradowa (TKM)	A	76	79	~~81~~	5	92	96	~~99~~	5	175

=== 71 kg ===
Rank	Athlete	Group	Snatch (kg)				Clean & Jerk (kg)				Total
Rank	Athlete	Group	1	2	3	Rank	1	2	3	Rank	Total
1st place, gold medalist(s)	Vanessa Sarno (PHI)	A	95	~~97~~	—	1st place, gold medalist(s)	115	117	121	1st place, gold medalist(s)	216
2nd place, silver medalist(s)	Phattharathida Wongsing (THA)	A	85	88	92	2nd place, silver medalist(s)	113	116	120	2nd place, silver medalist(s)	212
3rd place, bronze medalist(s)	Sevinchoy Komilova (UZB)	A	82	85	88	3rd place, bronze medalist(s)	105	107	110	4	198
4	Mashkhura Rustamova (UZB)	A	80	84	87	4	105	107	110	3rd place, bronze medalist(s)	197
5	Akari Nishio (JPN)	A	80	83	~~86~~	6	100	106	~~109~~	5	189
6	Laya Karimi (IRI)	A	78	83	~~86~~	5	91	~~95~~	~~95~~	6	174
7	Weam Qandeel (JOR)	A	50	~~60~~	60	7	65	~~70~~	~~71~~	7	125

=== 76 kg ===
Rank	Athlete	Group	Snatch (kg)				Clean & Jerk (kg)				Total
Rank	Athlete	Group	1	2	3	Rank	1	2	3	Rank	Total
1st place, gold medalist(s)	Park Su-min (KOR)	A	92	96	99	1st place, gold medalist(s)	113	118	~~121~~	1st place, gold medalist(s)	217
2nd place, silver medalist(s)	Madina Fayzullaeva (UZB)	A	86	89	~~93~~	2nd place, silver medalist(s)	105	108	111	3rd place, bronze medalist(s)	200
3rd place, bronze medalist(s)	Gulshodakhon Dadamirzaeva (UZB)	A	82	86	89	3rd place, bronze medalist(s)	105	109	~~112~~	6	198
4	Sanjana (IND)	A	82	86	~~88~~	5	107	112	~~115~~	2nd place, silver medalist(s)	198
5	Chalida Taingdee (THA)	A	~~86~~	~~87~~	87	4	106	~~110~~	110	5	197
6	Li Xing-en (TPE)	A	85	~~88~~	~~88~~	6	~~110~~	110	~~114~~	4	195
7	Asal Kadkhodaei (IRI)	A	~~78~~	78	~~82~~	7	92	~~96~~	96	7	174

=== 81 kg ===
Rank	Athlete	Group	Snatch (kg)				Clean & Jerk (kg)				Total
Rank	Athlete	Group	1	2	3	Rank	1	2	3	Rank	Total
1st place, gold medalist(s)	Anamjan Rustamowa (TKM)	A	98	103	~~107~~	1st place, gold medalist(s)	117	125	~~127~~	1st place, gold medalist(s)	228
2nd place, silver medalist(s)	Nigora Suvonova (UZB)	A	86	~~90~~	90	2nd place, silver medalist(s)	110	116	~~120~~	2nd place, silver medalist(s)	206
3rd place, bronze medalist(s)	Wang Hsin-hsiu (TPE)	A	85	~~89~~	89	3rd place, bronze medalist(s)	105	~~112~~	~~115~~	4	194
4	Anjana Sreejith (IND)	A	75	79	82	5	100	104	108	3rd place, bronze medalist(s)	190
5	Sri Lakshmi Chukka (IND)	A	75	79	83	4	100	—	—	5	183
6	Nujud Khormi (KSA)	A	53	60	63	6	75	~~82~~	~~85~~	6	138
7	Layan Al-Qurashi (KSA)	A	47	55	60	7	62	68	~~72~~	7	128

=== 87 kg ===
Rank	Athlete	Group	Snatch (kg)				Clean & Jerk (kg)				Total
Rank	Athlete	Group	1	2	3	Rank	1	2	3	Rank	Total
1st place, gold medalist(s)	Kim Su-a (KOR)	A	87	90	92	1st place, gold medalist(s)	113	117	120	1st place, gold medalist(s)	212
2nd place, silver medalist(s)	Kizhan Maghsoodi (IRI)	A	83	88	~~91~~	3rd place, bronze medalist(s)	105	111	116	2nd place, silver medalist(s)	204
3rd place, bronze medalist(s)	Boonyapat Boonchauy (THA)	A	85	88	91	2nd place, silver medalist(s)	107	~~112~~	112	3rd place, bronze medalist(s)	203
4	Nguyễn Ánh Như (VIE)	A	80	84	86	4	~~106~~	106	~~109~~	4	192

=== +87 kg ===
Rank	Athlete	Group	Snatch (kg)				Clean & Jerk (kg)				Total
Rank	Athlete	Group	1	2	3	Rank	1	2	3	Rank	Total
1st place, gold medalist(s)	Kim Hyo-eon (KOR)	A	105	~~109~~	109	1st place, gold medalist(s)	136	141	~~150~~	1st place, gold medalist(s)	250
2nd place, silver medalist(s)	Wang Ling-chen (TPE)	A	103	108	~~110~~	2nd place, silver medalist(s)	130	140	~~143~~	2nd place, silver medalist(s)	248
3rd place, bronze medalist(s)	Trần Thị Hiền (VIE)	A	94	96	100	3rd place, bronze medalist(s)	120	124	~~132~~	3rd place, bronze medalist(s)	224
4	Martina Devi Maibam (IND)	A	88	92	95	4	112	118	123	4	218
5	Lolakhona Abdurashidova (UZB)	A	83	~~85~~	~~87~~	5	105	~~110~~	110	5	193

== Youth men's results ==
=== 49 kg ===
Rank	Athlete	Group	Snatch (kg)				Clean & Jerk (kg)				Total
Rank	Athlete	Group	1	2	3	Rank	1	2	3	Rank	Total
1st place, gold medalist(s)	Prince Delos Santos (PHI)	A	92	94	~~96~~	1st place, gold medalist(s)	~~113~~	113	116	3rd place, bronze medalist(s)	210
2nd place, silver medalist(s)	Eron Borres (PHI)	A	85	88	91	3rd place, bronze medalist(s)	115	119	~~120~~	1st place, gold medalist(s)	210
3rd place, bronze medalist(s)	Bùi Minh Đạo (VIE)	A	~~90~~	90	93	2nd place, silver medalist(s)	116	~~118~~	~~118~~	2nd place, silver medalist(s)	209
4	Dhanush Loganathan (IND)	A	82	86	~~89~~	5	100	105	~~111~~	4	191
5	Diyorbek Odilov (UZB)	A	81	~~86~~	~~87~~	7	99	~~104~~	~~105~~	6	180
6	V Kishore (IND)	A	80	84	~~87~~	6	~~95~~	~~95~~	95	8	179
7	Nathapon Kijwanichniyom (THA)	A	71	~~76~~	~~76~~	10	91	96	101	5	172
8	Abbas Hussein (IRQ)	A	76	~~82~~	~~82~~	8	90	~~95~~	95	7	171
9	Bekbol Sarpashev (KGZ)	A	~~70~~	70	75	9	~~90~~	~~90~~	90	9	165
10	Wang Yu-chun (TPE)	A	55	60	~~63~~	11	70	75	~~80~~	10	135
—	Nguyễn Văn Nam (VIE)	A	~~86~~	87	~~89~~	4	~~113~~	~~114~~	~~114~~	—	—

=== 55 kg ===
Rank	Athlete	Group	Snatch (kg)				Clean & Jerk (kg)				Total
Rank	Athlete	Group	1	2	3	Rank	1	2	3	Rank	Total
1st place, gold medalist(s)	K'Dương (VIE)	A	105	~~115~~	~~115~~	1st place, gold medalist(s)	135	—	—	1st place, gold medalist(s)	240
2nd place, silver medalist(s)	Gurunaidu Sanapathi (IND)	A	98	101	104	2nd place, silver medalist(s)	~~125~~	125	~~130~~	4	229
3rd place, bronze medalist(s)	N Tomchou Meetei (IND)	A	98	100	103	3rd place, bronze medalist(s)	~~125~~	125	~~130~~	3rd place, bronze medalist(s)	228
4	Miraziz Mirsobirov (UZB)	A	96	99	102	4	115	125	~~128~~	2nd place, silver medalist(s)	227
5	Wutthiphong Chomkhunthod (THA)	A	89	95	100	5	108	~~115~~	115	5	215
6	Nurbek Azamatow (TKM)	A	83	86	~~89~~	6	98	~~102~~	102	6	188
7	Fahad Alotaibi (KUW)	A	~~71~~	71	~~77~~	7	91	96	101	7	172

=== 61 kg ===
Rank	Athlete	Group	Snatch (kg)				Clean & Jerk (kg)				Total
Rank	Athlete	Group	1	2	3	Rank	1	2	3	Rank	Total
1st place, gold medalist(s)	Albert Delos Santos (PHI)	A	105	110	~~112~~	4	145	148	~~150~~	1st place, gold medalist(s)	258
2nd place, silver medalist(s)	Perhat Bagtyýarow (TKM)	A	112	~~115~~	~~115~~	2nd place, silver medalist(s)	141	144	~~146~~	2nd place, silver medalist(s)	256
3rd place, bronze medalist(s)	Azizbek Shomurodov (UZB)	A	108	111	~~114~~	3rd place, bronze medalist(s)	135	142	~~146~~	3rd place, bronze medalist(s)	253
4	A Tiêu (VIE)	A	112	116	120	1st place, gold medalist(s)	~~132~~	132	~~140~~	6	252
5	Mehrab Davasari (IRI)	B	102	107	~~110~~	5	134	~~138~~	138	4	245
6	Kopkiat Sirisuk (THA)	B	96	101	106	6	115	122	129	7	235
7	Golom Tinku (IND)	B	100	~~104~~	~~105~~	7	128	135	~~139~~	5	235
8	Hong Ju-yan (TPE)	B	97	100	~~103~~	8	120	~~126~~	~~126~~	9	220
9	Tarha Mohammad (LBN)	B	97	~~102~~	~~102~~	9	122	~~127~~	~~128~~	8	219
—	K'Brừm (VIE)	A	~~110~~	—	—	—	—	—	—	—	—

=== 67 kg ===
Rank	Athlete	Group	Snatch (kg)				Clean & Jerk (kg)				Total
Rank	Athlete	Group	1	2	3	Rank	1	2	3	Rank	Total
1st place, gold medalist(s)	Bedabrat Bharali (IND)	B	119	122	124	1st place, gold medalist(s)	142	147	149	2nd place, silver medalist(s)	273
2nd place, silver medalist(s)	Nurillo Davlatboev (UZB)	B	116	120	123	2nd place, silver medalist(s)	141	147	149	1st place, gold medalist(s)	272
3rd place, bronze medalist(s)	A Tân (VIE)	B	~~116~~	117	~~119~~	4	130	137	140	3rd place, bronze medalist(s)	257
4	Mohammed Al-Ani (SYR)	B	115	~~118~~	118	3rd place, bronze medalist(s)	136	~~139~~	~~139~~	4	254
5	Mohammad Al-Zawri (KSA)	B	106	111	113	6	~~135~~	135	~~138~~	5	248
6	Yusup Garahanov (TKM)	B	110	~~115~~	115	5	125	130	~~135~~	7	245
7	Didarbek Jumabaýew (TKM)	B	~~103~~	105	108	7	127	132	135	6	243
—	Christian Rodriguez (PHI)	B	~~105~~	~~105~~	~~105~~	—	~~137~~	~~138~~	~~138~~	—	—

=== 73 kg ===
Rank	Athlete	Group	Snatch (kg)				Clean & Jerk (kg)				Total
Rank	Athlete	Group	1	2	3	Rank	1	2	3	Rank	Total
1st place, gold medalist(s)	Khikmatullo Khaydarov (UZB)	A	~~127~~	127	~~140~~	1st place, gold medalist(s)	150	155	160	1st place, gold medalist(s)	287
2nd place, silver medalist(s)	Krishna Venkata (IND)	A	115	117	120	2nd place, silver medalist(s)	143	148	151	2nd place, silver medalist(s)	271
3rd place, bronze medalist(s)	Isroilbek Ismoilov (UZB)	A	~~110~~	110	116	3rd place, bronze medalist(s)	140	148	~~156~~	3rd place, bronze medalist(s)	264
4	Hermant Pal (NEP)	A	85	92	97	4	~~110~~	110	~~120~~	4	207

=== 81 kg ===
Rank	Athlete	Group	Snatch (kg)				Clean & Jerk (kg)				Total
Rank	Athlete	Group	1	2	3	Rank	1	2	3	Rank	Total
1st place, gold medalist(s)	Diyorbek Ermatov (KAZ)	A	~~139~~	139	145	1st place, gold medalist(s)	167	174	~~177~~	1st place, gold medalist(s)	319
2nd place, silver medalist(s)	Iliya Salehipour (IRI)	A	135	140	~~146~~	2nd place, silver medalist(s)	166	173	~~180~~	2nd place, silver medalist(s)	313
3rd place, bronze medalist(s)	Mohamad Al-Kateb (IRQ)	A	129	133	~~138~~	3rd place, bronze medalist(s)	156	160	~~167~~	3rd place, bronze medalist(s)	293
4	Lalruatfela (IND)	A	121	125	~~128~~	5	150	154	157	4	282
5	Galkan Rahmanov (TKM)	A	120	125	~~128~~	4	~~150~~	153	~~157~~	5	278

=== 89 kg ===
Rank	Athlete	Group	Snatch (kg)				Clean & Jerk (kg)				Total
Rank	Athlete	Group	1	2	3	Rank	1	2	3	Rank	Total
1st place, gold medalist(s)	Farhad Gholizadeh (IRI)	A	136	143	~~146~~	2nd place, silver medalist(s)	167	~~174~~	174	1st place, gold medalist(s)	317
2nd place, silver medalist(s)	Amirmohammad Soleimanihazan (IRI)	A	133	138	144	1st place, gold medalist(s)	156	164	~~167~~	3rd place, bronze medalist(s)	308
3rd place, bronze medalist(s)	Ummatillo Rustambekov (UZB)	A	132	137	~~142~~	3rd place, bronze medalist(s)	164	168	~~172~~	2nd place, silver medalist(s)	305
4	Alaa Al-Malahma Hafedh (IRQ)	A	131	~~137~~	~~137~~	5	~~157~~	~~157~~	160	4	291
5	Nurmukhamed Kasenov (KGZ)	A	~~130~~	130	~~135~~	6	150	~~157~~	~~157~~	5	280
6	Lin Yen-chih (TPE)	A	110	115	~~120~~	7	135	140	145	6	260
7	Aitegin Zholdoshkulov (KGZ)	A	105	110	~~115~~	8	130	~~135~~	~~135~~	7	240
—	Ahmad Shammaa (SYR)	A	~~130~~	130	133	4	~~167~~	~~167~~	~~168~~	—	—

=== 96 kg ===
Rank	Athlete	Group	Snatch (kg)				Clean & Jerk (kg)				Total
Rank	Athlete	Group	1	2	3	Rank	1	2	3	Rank	Total
1st place, gold medalist(s)	Batirbek Parakhatov (UZB)	A	135	140	143	1st place, gold medalist(s)	164	~~170~~	175	1st place, gold medalist(s)	318
2nd place, silver medalist(s)	Farukh Shokirzhanov (KGZ)	A	130	135	140	2nd place, silver medalist(s)	160	167	~~175~~	4	307
3rd place, bronze medalist(s)	Hamidreza Zarei (IRI)	B	122	128	132	5	160	174	~~178~~	2nd place, silver medalist(s)	306
4	Dawood Al-Lami Ali Hazim (IRQ)	B	131	~~134~~	134	3rd place, bronze medalist(s)	~~171~~	171	~~175~~	3rd place, bronze medalist(s)	305
5	Liao Wen-zhe (TPE)	B	126	130	133	4	156	161	165	6	298
6	Abdullah Al-Ahmad (KSA)	B	118	123	129	7	161	'166	~~172~~	5	295
7	Mohammadamin Habibi (IRI)	B	120	126	130	6	155	~~161~~	~~162~~	7	285
8	Sanjay Yadav (NEP)	B	90	96	~~101~~	8	115	125	~~130~~	8	221

=== 102 kg ===
Rank	Athlete	Group	Snatch (kg)				Clean & Jerk (kg)				Total
Rank	Athlete	Group	1	2	3	Rank	1	2	3	Rank	Total
1st place, gold medalist(s)	Abolfazl Zare (IRI)	A	150	156	158	1st place, gold medalist(s)	185	190	~~196~~	1st place, gold medalist(s)	348
2nd place, silver medalist(s)	Abolfazl Kiani Shahvandi (IRI)	A	127	135	141	2nd place, silver medalist(s)	158	171	177	2nd place, silver medalist(s)	318
3rd place, bronze medalist(s)	Sonowal Kapil (IND)	A	115	120	125	3rd place, bronze medalist(s)	146	151	~~157~~	4	276
4	Uulu Erbol Ermek (KGZ)	A	114	120	~~126~~	4	145	150	156	3rd place, bronze medalist(s)	276

=== +102 kg ===
Rank	Athlete	Group	Snatch (kg)				Clean & Jerk (kg)				Total
Rank	Athlete	Group	1	2	3	Rank	1	2	3	Rank	Total
1st place, gold medalist(s)	Taha Nematimoghaddam (IRI)	A	160	166	~~172~~	1st place, gold medalist(s)	190	200	~~206~~	1st place, gold medalist(s)	366
2nd place, silver medalist(s)	Hamidreza Mohammaditanha (IRI)	A	147	155	158	2nd place, silver medalist(s)	175	187	192	2nd place, silver medalist(s)	350
3rd place, bronze medalist(s)	Wang Yu-cheng (TPE)	A	130	136	142	4	~~167~~	167	171	3rd place, bronze medalist(s)	313
4	Ali Mohammad (SYR)	A	141	143	~~150~~	3rd place, bronze medalist(s)	161	~~168~~	169	5	312
5	Asadbek Pazlitdinov (UZB)	A	120	131	137	5	155	163	169	4	306
6	Paramvir Singh (IND)	A	~~135~~	~~135~~	135	6	158	~~166~~	166	6	301

== Youth women's results ==
=== 40 kg ===
Rank	Athlete	Group	Snatch (kg)				Clean & Jerk (kg)				Total
Rank	Athlete	Group	1	2	3	Rank	1	2	3	Rank	Total
1st place, gold medalist(s)	Nguyễn Phương Linh (VIE)	A	51	54	56	2nd place, silver medalist(s)	68	~~76~~	~~76~~	1st place, gold medalist(s)	124
2nd place, silver medalist(s)	Alexsandra Diaz (PHI)	A	52	55	57	1st place, gold medalist(s)	63	66	~~70~~	2nd place, silver medalist(s)	123
3rd place, bronze medalist(s)	Jyoshna Sabar (IND)	A	50	53	55	3rd place, bronze medalist(s)	61	64	~~69~~	3rd place, bronze medalist(s)	119
4	Munisa Odilova (UZB)	A	49	~~52~~	~~52~~	4	62	~~65~~	~~65~~	4	111

=== 45 kg ===
Rank	Athlete	Group	Snatch (kg)				Clean & Jerk (kg)				Total
Rank	Athlete	Group	1	2	3	Rank	1	2	3	Rank	Total
1st place, gold medalist(s)	Angeline Colonia (PHI)	A	68	70	~~72~~	1st place, gold medalist(s)	80	82	~~85~~	2nd place, silver medalist(s)	152
2nd place, silver medalist(s)	Nguyễn Thị Hoài (VIE)	A	61	~~66~~	67	2nd place, silver medalist(s)	79	81	84	1st place, gold medalist(s)	151
3rd place, bronze medalist(s)	Ogulşat Amanowa (TKM)	A	65	~~68~~	~~68~~	3rd place, bronze medalist(s)	~~80~~	~~80~~	80	3rd place, bronze medalist(s)	145
4	Asmita Dhone (IND)	A	57	~~60~~	60	4	75	78	~~80~~	4	138
5	Chen Yan-xi (TPE)	A	53	57	~~60~~	5	~~70~~	70	73	5	130

=== 49 kg ===
Rank	Athlete	Group	Snatch (kg)				Clean & Jerk (kg)				Total
Rank	Athlete	Group	1	2	3	Rank	1	2	3	Rank	Total
1st place, gold medalist(s)	Jhodie Peralta (PHI)	A	70	~~72~~	73	1st place, gold medalist(s)	83	~~87~~	87	1st place, gold medalist(s)	160
2nd place, silver medalist(s)	Bar Koyel (IND)	B	63	66	69	2nd place, silver medalist(s)	81	84	86	2nd place, silver medalist(s)	155
3rd place, bronze medalist(s)	Phanida Denduang (THA)	A	~~64~~	64	67	3rd place, bronze medalist(s)	80	84	~~88~~	3rd place, bronze medalist(s)	151
4	Anita Feizi (IRI)	B	60	63	~~65~~	4	77	83	~~86~~	4	146
5	Nguyễn Thị Yến Nhi (VIE)	B	~~61~~	~~61~~	61	5	78	82	~~85~~	6	143
6	Zulfiya Ramazonova (UZB)	B	55	58	~~60~~	6	65	70	~~72~~	7	128
—	Pan Hsing-chen (TPE)	A	~~71~~	~~71~~	~~71~~	—	~~83~~	~~83~~	83	5	—

=== 55 kg ===
Rank	Athlete	Group	Snatch (kg)				Clean & Jerk (kg)				Total
Rank	Athlete	Group	1	2	3	Rank	1	2	3	Rank	Total
1st place, gold medalist(s)	Natcha Kaewnoi (THA)	A	76	~~79~~	~~79~~	2nd place, silver medalist(s)	95	98	100	1st place, gold medalist(s)	176
2nd place, silver medalist(s)	Rosalinda Faustino (PHI)	A	~~75~~	75	~~79~~	3rd place, bronze medalist(s)	92	97	~~100~~	2nd place, silver medalist(s)	172
3rd place, bronze medalist(s)	Ziyoda Khudoykulova (UZB)	B	71	74	78	1st place, gold medalist(s)	83	86	88	3rd place, bronze medalist(s)	166
4	Shakhnoza Jabbarova (UZB)	B	66	70	72	4	86	~~89~~	~~89~~	5	158
5	Santa Mina (IND)	B	~~65~~	65	~~69~~	5	80	83	87	4	152

=== 59 kg ===
Rank	Athlete	Group	Snatch (kg)				Clean & Jerk (kg)				Total
Rank	Athlete	Group	1	2	3	Rank	1	2	3	Rank	Total
1st place, gold medalist(s)	Lyudmila Elefteriadi (UZB)	A	73	77	79	3rd place, bronze medalist(s)	92	~~96~~	98	2nd place, silver medalist(s)	177
2nd place, silver medalist(s)	Kanittha Saetang (THA)	A	76	78	81	1st place, gold medalist(s)	90	~~94~~	95	3rd place, bronze medalist(s)	176
3rd place, bronze medalist(s)	Bellana Harika (IND)	A	71	75	78	4	92	95	98	1st place, gold medalist(s)	176
4	Seyedehghazal Hosseini (IRI)	A	75	80	~~82~~	2nd place, silver medalist(s)	90	~~94~~	94	4	174
5	Marjona Abdumutalova (UZB)	A	~~74~~	~~74~~	74	5	90	~~95~~	~~96~~	5	164
6	Seyedeh Zahra Hosseini (IRI)	A	72	~~77~~	~~78~~	6	88	~~93~~	~~93~~	6	160
7	Hoàng Thị Nhật Hà (VIE)	A	65	~~74~~	~~74~~	7	85	~~91~~	~~91~~	7	150
8	Mutlaq Jear Rafif (KSA)	A	49	~~52~~	53	8	61	66	~~69~~	8	119

=== 64 kg ===
Rank	Athlete	Group	Snatch (kg)				Clean & Jerk (kg)				Total
Rank	Athlete	Group	1	2	3	Rank	1	2	3	Rank	Total
1st place, gold medalist(s)	Seyedehghazaleh Hosseini (IRI)	A	78	~~81~~	81	1st place, gold medalist(s)	96	101	~~105~~	1st place, gold medalist(s)	182
2nd place, silver medalist(s)	Gülälek Kakamyradowa (TKM)	A	76	79	~~81~~	2nd place, silver medalist(s)	92	96	~~99~~	3rd place, bronze medalist(s)	175
3rd place, bronze medalist(s)	Hanieh Sharifi Sedeh (IRI)	A	72	~~76~~	~~77~~	6	95	100	~~104~~	2nd place, silver medalist(s)	172
4	Zeng Jing-chun (TPE)	A	75	~~78~~	~~78~~	4	90	93	~~97~~	4	168
5	Asalkhon Rajabova (UZB)	A	71	73	77	3rd place, bronze medalist(s)	85	90	~~94~~	5	167
6	C Harshika (IND)	A	66	70	73	5	83	87	90	6	163

=== 71 kg ===
Rank	Athlete	Group	Snatch (kg)				Clean & Jerk (kg)				Total
Rank	Athlete	Group	1	2	3	Rank	1	2	3	Rank	Total
1st place, gold medalist(s)	Phattharathida Wongsing (THA)	A	85	88	92	1st place, gold medalist(s)	113	116	120	1st place, gold medalist(s)	212
2nd place, silver medalist(s)	Laya Karimi (IRI)	A	78	83	~~86~~	2nd place, silver medalist(s)	91	~~95~~	~~95~~	3rd place, bronze medalist(s)	174
3rd place, bronze medalist(s)	Dilnoza Fayzullaeva (UZB)	A	73	76	~~80~~	3rd place, bronze medalist(s)	85	90	93	2nd place, silver medalist(s)	169
4	Ramadass Harini (IND)	A	67	70	~~74~~	5	88	~~92~~	~~100~~	4	158
5	Chelsi (IND)	A	68	71	~~74~~	4	85	~~91~~	~~91~~	5	156
6	Weam Qandeel (JOR)	A	50	~~60~~	60	6	65	~~70~~	~~71~~	6	125

=== 76 kg ===
Rank	Athlete	Group	Snatch (kg)				Clean & Jerk (kg)				Total
Rank	Athlete	Group	1	2	3	Rank	1	2	3	Rank	Total
1st place, gold medalist(s)	Madina Fayzullaeva (UZB)	A	86	89	~~93~~	1st place, gold medalist(s)	105	108	111	2nd place, silver medalist(s)	200
2nd place, silver medalist(s)	Sanjana (IND)	A	82	86	~~88~~	2nd place, silver medalist(s)	107	112	~~115~~	1st place, gold medalist(s)	198
3rd place, bronze medalist(s)	Asal Kadkhodaei (IRI)	A	~~78~~	78	~~82~~	3rd place, bronze medalist(s)	92	~~96~~	96	4	174
—	Chiang Sin-yueh (TPE)	A	~~85~~	~~85~~	~~85~~	—	95	97	~~112~~	3rd place, bronze medalist(s)	—

=== 81 kg ===
Rank	Athlete	Group	Snatch (kg)				Clean & Jerk (kg)				Total
Rank	Athlete	Group	1	2	3	Rank	1	2	3	Rank	Total
1st place, gold medalist(s)	Anamjan Rustamowa (TKM)	A	98	103	~~107~~	1st place, gold medalist(s)	117	125	~~127~~	1st place, gold medalist(s)	228
2nd place, silver medalist(s)	Chen Ko-ko (TPE)	A	75	78	~~83~~	2nd place, silver medalist(s)	~~100~~	100	—	2nd place, silver medalist(s)	178
3rd place, bronze medalist(s)	Layan Al-Qurashi (KSA)	A	47	55	60	3rd place, bronze medalist(s)	62	68	~~72~~	3rd place, bronze medalist(s)	128

=== +81 kg ===
Rank	Athlete	Group	Snatch (kg)				Clean & Jerk (kg)				Total
Rank	Athlete	Group	1	2	3	Rank	1	2	3	Rank	Total
1st place, gold medalist(s)	Trần Thị Hiền (VIE)	A	94	96	100	1st place, gold medalist(s)	120	124	~~132~~	1st place, gold medalist(s)	224
2nd place, silver medalist(s)	Martina Maibam (IND)	A	88	92	95	2nd place, silver medalist(s)	112	118	123	2nd place, silver medalist(s)	218
3rd place, bronze medalist(s)	Lolakhona Abdurashidova (UZB)	A	83	~~85~~	~~87~~	4	105	~~110~~	110	3rd place, bronze medalist(s)	193
4	Nguyễn Ánh Như (VIE)	A	80	84	86	3rd place, bronze medalist(s)	~~106~~	106	~~109~~	4	192
