= 2023 Junior World Weightlifting Championships =

- Venue: Foro de Halterofilia
- Location: Guadalajara, Mexico
- Dates: 15–23 November
- Competitors: 229 from 44 nations

The 2023 Junior World Weightlifting Championships was a weightlifting competition held in Guadalajara, Mexico, from 15 to 23 November 2023.

== Medal table ==
Ranking by Big (Total result) medals

* Host nation (Mexico)

| Rank | Nation | Gold | Silver | Bronze | Total |
|---|---|---|---|---|---|
| 1 | United States | 3 | 3 | 1 | 7 |
| 2 | Mexico* | 3 | 0 | 1 | 4 |
| 3 | Armenia | 3 | 0 | 0 | 3 |
| 4 | Iran | 2 | 3 | 0 | 5 |
| 5 | Ukraine | 2 | 0 | 2 | 4 |
| 6 | Chinese Taipei | 2 | 0 | 0 | 2 |
| 7 | Ecuador | 1 | 1 | 0 | 2 |
| 7 | Kazakhstan | 1 | 1 | 0 | 2 |
| 9 | Georgia | 1 | 0 | 4 | 5 |
| 10 | Turkey | 1 | 0 | 1 | 2 |
| 10 | Venezuela | 1 | 0 | 1 | 2 |
| 12 | Japan | 0 | 3 | 4 | 7 |
| 13 | Turkmenistan | 0 | 3 | 0 | 3 |
| 14 | Egypt | 0 | 2 | 1 | 3 |
| 15 | Spain | 0 | 1 | 1 | 2 |
| – | Individual Neutral Athletes | 0 | 1 | 1 | 2 |
| 16 | Canada | 0 | 1 | 0 | 1 |
| 16 | Thailand | 0 | 1 | 0 | 1 |
| 18 | Brazil | 0 | 0 | 1 | 1 |
| 18 | Poland | 0 | 0 | 1 | 1 |
| 18 | Slovakia | 0 | 0 | 1 | 1 |
| Totals (20 entries) | | 20 | 20 | 20 | 60 |

Ranking by all medals: Big (Total result) and Small (Snatch and Clean & Jerk)

* Host nation (Mexico)

| Rank | Nation | Gold | Silver | Bronze | Total |
|---|---|---|---|---|---|
| 1 | United States | 10 | 5 | 3 | 18 |
| 2 | Mexico* | 8 | 4 | 5 | 17 |
| 3 | Armenia | 7 | 1 | 1 | 9 |
| 4 | Iran | 5 | 9 | 1 | 15 |
| 5 | Ukraine | 5 | 1 | 4 | 10 |
| 6 | Georgia | 4 | 0 | 6 | 10 |
| 7 | Japan | 3 | 7 | 8 | 18 |
| 8 | Chinese Taipei | 3 | 2 | 4 | 9 |
| 9 | Kazakhstan | 3 | 2 | 0 | 5 |
| 10 | Turkey | 3 | 1 | 2 | 6 |
| 11 | Turkmenistan | 2 | 7 | 0 | 9 |
| 12 | Ecuador | 2 | 4 | 0 | 6 |
| 13 | Egypt | 1 | 4 | 6 | 11 |
| 14 | Venezuela | 1 | 3 | 3 | 7 |
| 15 | Spain | 1 | 2 | 2 | 5 |
| – | Individual Neutral Athletes | 1 | 1 | 5 | 7 |
| 16 | Albania | 1 | 0 | 0 | 1 |
| 17 | Canada | 0 | 3 | 1 | 4 |
| 18 | Thailand | 0 | 2 | 1 | 3 |
| 19 | Poland | 0 | 1 | 2 | 3 |
| 20 | Romania | 0 | 1 | 0 | 1 |
| 21 | Brazil | 0 | 0 | 2 | 2 |
| 21 | Slovakia | 0 | 0 | 2 | 2 |
| 23 | Mongolia | 0 | 0 | 1 | 1 |
| 23 | New Zealand | 0 | 0 | 1 | 1 |
| Totals (24 entries) | | 60 | 60 | 60 | 180 |

== Medalists ==
=== Men ===
| Event | Gold | | Silver | | Bronze | |
55 kg
| Snatch | José Poox; Mexico | 103 kg | Andrii Revko; Ukraine | 100 kg | Kento Kousaka; Japan | 97 kg |
| Clean & Jerk | José Poox; Mexico | 131 kg | Kento Kousaka; Japan | 130 kg | Wilfredo Alemán; Mexico | 121 kg |
| Total | José Poox; Mexico | 234 kg | Kento Kousaka; Japan | 227 kg | Andrii Revko; Ukraine | 220 kg |
61 kg
| Snatch | Gabriel Chhum; United States | 117 kg | Abraham Rivera; Venezuela | 113 kg | Ali Elsayed; Egypt | 111 kg |
| Clean & Jerk | Gabriel Chhum; United States | 145 kg | Ali Elsayed; Egypt | 143 kg | Adolfo Tun; Mexico | 141 kg |
| Total | Gabriel Chhum; United States | 262 kg | Ali Elsayed; Egypt | 254 kg | Abraham Rivera; Venezuela | 248 kg |
67 kg
| Snatch | Gor Sahakyan; Armenia | 140 kg | Yahor Papou; Individual Neutral Athletes | 136 kg | Herseleid Carrazco; Mexico | 130 kg |
| Clean & Jerk | Hampton Morris; United States | 178 kg | Gor Sahakyan; Armenia | 165 kg | Yahor Hrynko; Individual Neutral Athletes | 163 kg |
| Total | Gor Sahakyan; Armenia | 305 kg | Hampton Morris; United States | 303 kg | Yahor Papou; Individual Neutral Athletes | 294 kg |
73 kg
| Snatch | Ismail Jamali; Spain | 145 kg | Tiberiu Donose; Romania | 141 kg | Reinner Arango; Venezuela | 141 kg |
| Clean & Jerk | Rakuei Azuma; Japan | 176 kg | Reinner Arango; Venezuela | 176 kg | Martin Poghosyan; Armenia | 171 kg |
| Total | Reinner Arango; Venezuela | 317 kg | Rakuei Azuma; Japan | 316 kg | Ismail Jamali; Spain | 315 kg |
81 kg
| Snatch | Mohamed Abdelmoneim; Egypt | 151 kg | Gaýgysyz Töräýew; Turkmenistan | 151 kg | Preston Powell; United States | 150 kg |
| Clean & Jerk | Yedige Yemberdi; Kazakhstan | 191 kg | Gaýgysyz Töräýew; Turkmenistan | 184 kg | Saba Asanidze; Georgia | 184 kg |
| Total | Yedige Yemberdi; Kazakhstan | 336 kg | Gaýgysyz Töräýew; Turkmenistan | 335 kg | Saba Asanidze; Georgia | 333 kg |
89 kg
| Snatch | Ertjan Kofsha; Albania | 159 kg | Elijah James Hein; United States | 158 kg | Inhatsi Pauliukavets; Individual Neutral Athletes | 156 kg |
| Clean & Jerk | Elijah James Hein; United States | 193 kg | Jonathan Ramos; Mexico | 192 kg | Inhatsi Pauliukavets; Individual Neutral Athletes | 192 kg |
| Total | Elijah James Hein; United States | 351 kg | Inhatsi Pauliukavets; Individual Neutral Athletes | 348 kg | Zurab Mskhaladze; Georgia | 346 kg |
96 kg
| Snatch | Şahzadbek Matýakubow; Turkmenistan | 167 kg | Masashi Nishikawa; Japan | 167 kg | Alireza Nassiri; Iran | 166 kg |
| Clean & Jerk | Alireza Nassiri; Iran | 205 kg | Şahzadbek Matýakubow; Turkmenistan | 200 kg | Masashi Nishikawa; Japan | 195 kg |
| Total | Alireza Nassiri; Iran | 371 kg | Şahzadbek Matýakubow; Turkmenistan | 367 kg | Masashi Nishikawa; Japan | 362 kg |
102 kg
| Snatch | Garik Karapetyan; Armenia | 175 kg | Abolfazl Zare; Iran | 166 kg | Muhammed Emin Burun; Turkey | 161 kg |
| Clean & Jerk | Garik Karapetyan; Armenia | 203 kg | Abolfazl Zare; Iran | 199 kg | Gurami Vekua; Georgia | 198 kg |
| Total | Garik Karapetyan; Armenia | 378 kg | Abolfazl Zare; Iran | 365 kg | Gurami Vekua; Georgia | 358 kg |
109 kg
| Snatch | Giorgi Kirvalidze; Georgia | 169 kg | Ariya Paydar; Iran | 168 kg | Mykyta Rubanovskyi; Ukraine | 167 kg |
| Clean & Jerk | Mykyta Rubanovskyi; Ukraine | 207 kg | Ariya Paydar; Iran | 205 kg | Uladzislau Sakovich; Individual Neutral Athletes | 199 kg |
| Total | Mykyta Rubanovskyi; Ukraine | 374 kg | Ariya Paydar; Iran | 373 kg | Giorgi Kirvalidze; Georgia | 364 kg |
+109 kg
| Snatch | Alireza Yousefi; Iran | 180 kg | Taha Nemati Moghaddam; Iran | 176 kg YWR | Vladimir Macura; Slovakia | 168 kg |
| Clean & Jerk | Alireza Yousefi; Iran | 240 kg | Taha Nemati Moghaddam; Iran | 205 kg | Kao Jia-hui; Chinese Taipei | 193 kg |
| Total | Alireza Yousefi; Iran | 420 kg | Taha Nemati Moghaddam; Iran | 381 kg | Vladimir Macura; Slovakia | 359 kg |

=== Women ===
| Event | Gold | | Silver | | Bronze | |
45 kg
| Snatch | Cansu Bektaş; Turkey | 73 kg | Marta García; Spain | 71 kg | Habiba Abdelfattah; Egypt | 69 kg |
| Clean & Jerk | Gamze Altun; Turkey | 91 kg | Cansu Bektaş; Turkey | 90 kg | Marta García; Spain | 86 kg |
| Total | Cansu Bektaş; Turkey | 163 kg | Marta García; Spain | 157 kg | Gamze Altun; Turkey | 154 kg |
49 kg
| Snatch | Nozomi Abe; Japan | 79 kg | Kerlys Montilla; Venezuela | 76 kg | Huang Yi-chen; Chinese Taipei | 76 kg |
| Clean & Jerk | Isabella Rodriguez; United States | 99 kg | Huang Yi-chen; Chinese Taipei | 96 kg | Kerlys Montilla; Venezuela | 94 kg |
| Total | Huang Yi-chen; Chinese Taipei | 172 kg | Isabella Rodriguez; United States | 171 kg | Nozomi Abe; Japan | 170 kg |
55 kg
| Snatch | Nanasa Kawasaki; Japan | 84 kg | Mao Tsutsumi; Japan | 83 kg | Małgorzata Myjak; Poland | 83 kg |
| Clean & Jerk | Aleksandra Grigoryan; Armenia | 107 kg | Nanasa Kawasaki; Japan | 103 kg | Mao Tsutsumi; Japan | 103 kg |
| Total | Aleksandra Grigoryan; Armenia | 188 kg | Nanasa Kawasaki; Japan | 187 kg | Mao Tsutsumi; Japan | 186 kg |
59 kg
| Snatch | Svitlana Samuliak; Ukraine | 98 kg | Jéssica Palacios; Ecuador | 92 kg | Sei Higa; Japan | 90 kg |
| Clean & Jerk | Svitlana Samuliak; Ukraine | 116 kg | Jéssica Palacios; Ecuador | 115 kg | Chiu Yu-ling; Chinese Taipei | 108 kg |
| Total | Svitlana Samuliak; Ukraine | 214 kg | Jéssica Palacios; Ecuador | 207 kg | Sei Higa; Japan | 196 kg |
64 kg
| Snatch | Katsiaryna Yakushava; Individual Neutral Athletes | 96 kg | Charlotte Simoneau; Canada | 95 kg | Otgonchimegiin Tögs-Erdene; Mongolia | 95 kg |
| Clean & Jerk | Katharine Estep; United States | 120 kg | Charlotte Simoneau; Canada | 118 kg | Olha Ivzhenko; Ukraine | 115 kg |
| Total | Katharine Estep; United States | 214 kg | Charlotte Simoneau; Canada | 213 kg | Olha Ivzhenko; Ukraine | 208 kg |
71 kg
| Snatch | Mariana García; Mexico | 93 kg | Martyna Dołęga; Poland | 93 kg | Phattharathida Wongsing; Thailand | 92 kg |
| Clean & Jerk | Mariana García; Mexico | 123 kg | Phattharathida Wongsing; Thailand | 116 kg | Chen Hsin-ning; Chinese Taipei | 115 kg |
| Total | Mariana García; Mexico | 216 kg | Phattharathida Wongsing; Thailand | 208 kg | Martyna Dołęga; Poland | 204 kg |
76 kg
| Snatch | Ella Nicholson; United States | 105 kg | Kelin Jiménez; Ecuador | 104 kg | Ángeles Cruz; Mexico | 100 kg |
| Clean & Jerk | Kelin Jiménez; Ecuador | 130 kg | Ángeles Cruz; Mexico | 123 kg | Ella Nicholson; United States | 122 kg |
| Total | Kelin Jiménez; Ecuador | 234 kg | Ella Nicholson; United States | 227 kg | Ángeles Cruz; Mexico | 223 kg |
81 kg
| Snatch | Anamjan Rustamowa; Turkmenistan | 104 kg | Vanessa Hernández; Mexico | 102 kg | Rahma Ahmed Elsayed; Egypt | 101 kg |
| Clean & Jerk | Vanessa Hernández; Mexico | 126 kg | Anamjan Rustamowa; Turkmenistan | 123 kg | Rahma Ahmed Elsayed; Egypt | 122 kg |
| Total | Vanessa Hernández; Mexico | 228 kg | Anamjan Rustamowa; Turkmenistan | 227 kg | Rahma Ahmed Elsayed; Egypt | 223 kg |
87 kg
| Snatch | Mariam Murgvliani; Georgia | 102 kg | Denise Amanda Robles; United States | 101 kg | Medea Jones; New Zealand | 98 kg |
| Clean & Jerk | Mariam Murgvliani; Georgia | 123 kg | Fatma Sadek; Egypt | 122 kg | Estefany Espinoza; Mexico | 120 kg |
| Total | Mariam Murgvliani; Georgia | 225 kg | Fatma Sadek; Egypt | 219 kg | Denise Amanda Robles; United States | 215 kg |
+87 kg
| Snatch | Wang Ling-chen; Chinese Taipei | 111 kg | Aisamal Sansyzbayeva; Kazakhstan | 107 kg | Etta Mae Love; Canada | 106 kg |
| Clean & Jerk | Aisamal Sansyzbayeva; Kazakhstan | 143 kg | Wang Ling-chen; Chinese Taipei | 141 kg | Taiane Justino; Brazil | 140 kg |
| Total | Wang Ling-chen; Chinese Taipei | 252 kg | Aisamal Sansyzbayeva; Kazakhstan | 250 kg | Taiane Justino; Brazil | 245 kg |

== Team ranking ==
=== Men ===
| Rank | Team | Points |
|---|---|---|
| 1 | Iran | 668 |
| 2 | Mexico | 592 |
| 3 | United States | 589 |
| 4 | Georgia | 455 |
| 5 | Ukraine | 326 |
| 6 | Poland | 320 |
| 7 | Egypt | 297 |
| 8 | Armenia | 292 |
| 9 | Chinese Taipei | 262 |
| 10 | Turkmenistan | 246 |

=== Women ===
| Rank | Team | Points |
|---|---|---|
| 1 | Mexico | 628 |
| 2 | United States | 624 |
| 3 | Japan | 458 |
| 4 | Venezuela | 405 |
| 5 | Chinese Taipei | 397 |
| 6 | Canada | 370 |
| 7 | Poland | 315 |
| 8 | Egypt | 301 |
| 9 | Spain | 249 |
| 10 | Ukraine | 206 |

== Participating nations ==
229 athletes from 44 countries:

- Albania (1)
- Argentina (1)
- Armenia (7)
- Australia (6)
- Austria (3)
- Azerbaijan (1)
- Belarus (3)
- Belgium (1)
- Brazil (3)
- Canada (11)
- Chile (2)
- Chinese Taipei (13)
- Costa Rica (2)
- Croatia (2)
- Cuba (2)
- Czech Republic (3)
- Ecuador (4)
- Egypt (11)
- El Salvador (3)
- Estonia (1)
- France (1)
- Georgia (9)
- Germany (1)
- Great Britain (2)
- Iran (10)
- Japan (10)
- Kazakhstan (5)
- Malta (3)
- Mexico (20) Host
- Mongolia (1)
- New Zealand (4)
- Panama (1)
- Peru (4)
- Poland (11)
- Romania (4)
- Slovakia (1)
- Spain (8)
- Sweden (2)
- Thailand (2)
- Turkmenistan (6)
- Turkey (4)
- Ukraine (8)
- United States (20)
- Venezuela (10)

== Men's results ==
=== 55 kg ===
| Rank | Athlete | Group | Snatch (kg) | | | | Clean & Jerk (kg) | | | | Total |
| Rank | Athlete | Group | 1 | 2 | 3 | Rank | 1 | 2 | 3 | Rank | Total |
|---|---|---|---|---|---|---|---|---|---|---|---|
| 1st place, gold medalist(s) | José Poox (MEX) | A | 97 | 100 | 103 | 1st place, gold medalist(s) | 125 | 129 | 131 | 1st place, gold medalist(s) | 234 |
| 2nd place, silver medalist(s) | Kento Kousaka (JPN) | A | 93 | 97 | ~~100~~ | 3rd place, bronze medalist(s) | 120 | 125 | 130 | 2nd place, silver medalist(s) | 227 |
| 3rd place, bronze medalist(s) | Andrii Revko (UKR) | A | 94 | 98 | 100 | 2nd place, silver medalist(s) | 120 | ~~125~~ | ~~125~~ | 4 | 220 |
| 4 | Wilfredo Alemán (MEX) | A | 94 | ~~98~~ | ~~99~~ | 4 | 117 | 121 | ~~126~~ | 3rd place, bronze medalist(s) | 215 |
| 5 | Tang Chun-yen (TPE) | A | 85 | 88 | 91 | 6 | 115 | 120 | ~~124~~ | 5 | 211 |
| 6 | Nol Chumbe (PER) | A | ~~94~~ | 94 | ~~98~~ | 5 | ~~110~~ | ~~111~~ | ~~111~~ | 7 | 205 |
| 7 | Aleksandr Dzobak (CZE) | A | 82 | 85 | 89 | 7 | 107 | 112 | 116 | 7 | 205 |

=== 61 kg ===
| Rank | Athlete | Group | Snatch (kg) | | | | Clean & Jerk (kg) | | | | Total |
| Rank | Athlete | Group | 1 | 2 | 3 | Rank | 1 | 2 | 3 | Rank | Total |
|---|---|---|---|---|---|---|---|---|---|---|---|
| 1st place, gold medalist(s) | Gabriel Chhum (USA) | A | 112 | 117 | ~~121~~ | 1st place, gold medalist(s) | ~~142~~ | 143 | 145 | 1st place, gold medalist(s) | 262 |
| 2nd place, silver medalist(s) | Ali Elsayed (EGY) | A | 107 | 111 | ~~114~~ | 3rd place, bronze medalist(s) | 138 | 143 | ~~148~~ | 2nd place, silver medalist(s) | 254 |
| 3rd place, bronze medalist(s) | Abraham Rivera (VEN) | A | 105 | 109 | 113 | 2nd place, silver medalist(s) | 135 | ~~139~~ | ~~139~~ | 4 | 248 |
| 4 | Adolfo Tun (MEX) | A | 97 | 102 | ~~105~~ | 4 | 141 | ~~145~~ | ~~147~~ | 3rd place, bronze medalist(s) | 243 |

=== 67 kg ===
| Rank | Athlete | Group | Snatch (kg) | | | | Clean & Jerk (kg) | | | | Total |
| Rank | Athlete | Group | 1 | 2 | 3 | Rank | 1 | 2 | 3 | Rank | Total |
|---|---|---|---|---|---|---|---|---|---|---|---|
| 1st place, gold medalist(s) | Gor Sakhayan (ARM) | A | 135 | 140 | ~~147~~ | 1st place, gold medalist(s) | 165 | ~~171~~ | ~~171~~ | 2nd place, silver medalist(s) | 305 |
| 2nd place, silver medalist(s) | Hampton Morris (USA) | A | 119 | 125 | ~~130~~ | 7 | 164 | 170 | 178 | 1st place, gold medalist(s) | 303 |
| 3rd place, bronze medalist(s) | Yahor Papou (AIN) | A | ~~130~~ | 130 | 136 | 2nd place, silver medalist(s) | 158 | ~~163~~ | ~~163~~ | 5 | 294 |
| 4 | Herseleid Carrazco (MEX) | B | 122 | 127 | 130 | 3rd place, bronze medalist(s) | 153 | 157 | 162 | 4 | 292 |
| 5 | Yahor Hrynko (AIN) | A | 123 | ~~126~~ | 126 | 5 | 155 | 159 | 163 | 3rd place, bronze medalist(s) | 289 |
| 6 | Helmi Abdelbari (EGY) | A | 124 | ~~127~~ | 127 | 4 | 156 | ~~163~~ | ~~164~~ | 7 | 283 |
| 7 | Yang Fan-shun (TPE) | B | ~~125~~ | 125 | ~~128~~ | 6 | ~~150~~ | 150 | ~~153~~ | 8 | 275 |
| 8 | Mario Marquez (USA) | B | ~~112~~ | 112 | 115 | 12 | 152 | 156 | ~~160~~ | 6 | 271 |
| 9 | Perhat Bagtyýarow (TKM) | A | 120 | ~~125~~ | ~~125~~ | 10 | ~~150~~ | 150 | ~~157~~ | 9 | 270 |
| 10 | Petr Khrebtov (KAZ) | A | 120 | ~~124~~ | ~~124~~ | 9 | ~~150~~ | ~~150~~ | 150 | 10 | 270 |
| 11 | David Garcia (VEN) | B | ~~113~~ | 113 | 116 | 11 | ~~140~~ | 140 | 145 | 11 | 261 |
| 12 | Marcin Wiatrowicz (POL) | B | 117 | ~~120~~ | 120 | 8 | ~~135~~ | 135 | 140 | 13 | 260 |
| 13 | Mateo Rentería (PER) | B | ~~110~~ | ~~110~~ | 110 | 14 | 140 | 144 | ~~146~~ | 12 | 254 |
| 14 | Feras Eldin (CAN) | B | 110 | 113 | ~~116~~ | 13 | 135 | ~~139~~ | ~~140~~ | 14 | 248 |
