= Syria at the 2026 Asian Games =

- IOC code: SYR
- NOC: Syrian Olympic Committee

in Aichi–Nagoya, Japan September 19 – October 4, 2026
- Competitors: 15 in 10 sports
- Medals Ranked 37th: Gold 0 Silver 0 Bronze 1 Total 1

Asian Games appearances (overview)
- 1951; 1954; 1958; 1962; 1966; 1970; 1974; 1978; 1982; 1986; 1990; 1994; 1998; 2002; 2006; 2010; 2014; 2018; 2022; 2026

Syria competed at the 2026 Asian Games in Aichi Prefecture and Nagoya, Japan, from September 19 to October 4, 2026.

The Syrian delegation consisted of 15 athletes who competed in 10 sports.

== Medalists ==
The following athlete from Syria won medal at the Games.

Medal	Name	Sport	Event	Date
Bronze	Fawaz Bani Al-Marjeh	Karate	Men's kumite –75 kg	22 September

== Medal summary ==
Medals by sport
Sport	1st place, gold medalist(s)	2nd place, silver medalist(s)	3rd place, bronze medalist(s)	Total
Karate	0	0	1	1
Total	0	0	1	1

Medals by gender
Gender	1st place, gold medalist(s)	2nd place, silver medalist(s)	3rd place, bronze medalist(s)	Total
Male	0	0	1	1
Total	0	0	1	1

Medals by date
Date	1st place, gold medalist(s)	2nd place, silver medalist(s)	3rd place, bronze medalist(s)	Total
22 September	0	0	1	1
Total	0	0	1	1

== Competitors ==
The following is the list of number of competitors participated at the Games per sport/discipline.

Sport	Men	Women	Total
Athletics	1	0	1
Kurash	1	0	1
Cycling	1	0	1
Esports	1	2	3
Gymnastics	0	1	1
Judo	1	0	1
Karate	2	0	2
Shooting	2	0	2
Table tennis	0	2	2
Wrestling	1	0	1
Total	10	5	15

== Athletics ==
Athlete	Event	Qualification		Final	
Athlete	Event	Distance	Position	Distance	Position
Mohammad Alsalami	Men's high jump	DNS		Did not advance	
Mohammad Alsalami	Men's triple jump	—N/a		15.90	7

== Cycling ==
=== Road ===
Athlete	Event	Time	Rank
Ibrahiem Al-Refai	Men's individual time trial	DNS	

== Esports ==
Team	Event	Group stage				Quarterfinals	Semifinals	Final	
Team	Event	Opposition Score	Opposition Score	Opposition Score	Rank	Opposition Score	Opposition Score	Opposition Score	Rank
Hazar Salloum; Moaoia Al-Hmadi; Nour Al-Saadi	Competitive Martial Arts	Chinese Taipei (TPE); L DNS	Pakistan (PAK); L 0–3	Thailand (THA); L 0–3	4	Did not advance			

== Gymnastics ==
=== Rhythmic ===
Athlete	Event	Qualification						Final					
Athlete	Event	Hoop	Ball	Clubs	Ribbon	Total	Rank	Hoop	Ball	Clubs	Ribbon	Total	Rank
Alisa Daud	Women's individual	18.300	16.700	18.850	17.950	71.800	22	Did not advance					

== Judo ==
Athlete	Event	Round of 32	Round of 16	Quarterfinals	Semifinals	Repechage	Final / BM	
Athlete	Event	Opposition Result	Opposition Result	Opposition Result	Opposition Result	Opposition Result	Opposition Result	Rank
Mohamad Omran Ajineh	Men's –60 kg	Guchkov (CAM); L WO	Did not advance					

== Karate ==
Key:

- H - Hantei (Decision)

Athlete	Event	Round of 32	Round of 16	Quarterfinals	Semifinals	Repechage	Final / BM	
Athlete	Event	Opposition Result	Opposition Result	Opposition Result	Opposition Result	Opposition Result	Opposition Result	Rank
Mohammad Darwish	Men's kumite 67 kg	Bye	Shih Ch-ch (TPE); L 1–5	Did not advance				
Fawaz Bani Almarjeh	Men's kumite 75 kg	—N/a	Bye	An G-m (KOR); W 11–2	Nazmyradow (TKM) (H) L 0–0	—N/a	Nurlanov (KGZ); W 18–8	3rd place, bronze medalist(s)

== Kurash ==
Athlete	Event	Round of 16	Quarterfinals	Semifinals	Repechage	Final	
Athlete	Event	Opposition Result	Opposition Result	Opposition Result	Opposition Result	Opposition Result	Rank
Majd Hajkadoor	Men's −81 kg	—N/a	Sung Hs-ch (TPE); L 0–10	Did not advance			

== Shooting ==
Athlete	Event	Qualification		Final	
Athlete	Event	Points	Rank	Points	Rank
Fadi Hamdan	Men's 10 m air pistol	549	59	Did not advance	
Wssam Jafaar	Men's trap	92	40	Did not advance	

== Table tennis ==
Athlete	Event	Round of 64	Round of 32	Round of 16	Quarterfinals	Semifinals	Final	
Athlete	Event	Opposition Score	Opposition Score	Opposition Score	Opposition Score	Opposition Score	Opposition Score	Rank
Hend Zaza	Women's singles	Khan (PAK); W 4–0	Ghorpade (IND); L 1–4	Did not advance				
Rashel Abboud	Women's singles	Chiri (LBN); W 4–0	Zeng (SGP); L 0–4	Did not advance				
Hend Zaza; Rashel Abboud	Women's doubles	Maharani / Sudarnita (INA); L 0–3	Did not advance					

== Wrestling ==
Syria entered five wrestlers.

Key:

- VT (ranking points: 5–0 or 0–5) – Victory by fall.
- VB (ranking points: 5–0 or 0–5) – Victory by injury (VF for forfeit, VA for withdrawal or disqualification)
- PP (ranking points: 3–1 or 1–3) – Decision by points – the loser with technical points.
- PO (ranking points: 3–0 or 0–3) – Decision by points – the loser without technical points.
- ST (ranking points: 4–0 or 0–4) – Great superiority – the loser without technical points and a margin of victory of at least 8 (Greco-Roman) or 10 (freestyle) points.
- SP (ranking points: 4–1 or 1–4) – Technical superiority – the loser with technical points and a margin of victory of at least 8 (Greco-Roman) or 10 (freestyle) points.

Freestyle

Athlete	Event	Round of 32	Round of 16	Quarterfinals	Semifinals	Repechage	Final / BM	
Athlete	Event	Opposition Result	Opposition Result	Opposition Result	Opposition Result	Opposition Result	Opposition Result	Rank
Ibrahim Al-Tabbaa	Men's −57 kg	Wong (HKG); W 10–0^{SP}	Kim (KOR); L 2–12^{SP}	Did not advance				
