= 2025 World Weightlifting Championships – Men's 110 kg =

Men's 110 kg at the 2025 World Weightlifting Championships
- Venue: Førdehuset
- Location: Førde, Norway
- Dates: 10 October
- Winning total: 428 kg CWR

Medalists
gold medal	Akbar Djuraev	Uzbekistan
silver medal	Alireza Nassiri	Iran
bronze medal	Ruslan Nurudinov	Uzbekistan

The men's 110 kilograms competition at the 2025 World Weightlifting Championships was held on 10 October 2025.

== Schedule ==
Date	Time	Event
10 October 2025	10:00	Group D
10 October 2025	12:00	Group C
10 October 2025	14:30	Group B
10 October 2025	19:30	Group A

== Records ==
Prior to this competition, the existing world records were as follows.

World record	Snatch	World Standard	195 kg	—	1 June 2025
World record	Clean & Jerk	World Standard	237 kg	—	1 June 2025
World record	Total	World Standard	427 kg	—	1 June 2025

== Results ==
Rank	Athlete	Group	Snatch (kg)				Clean & Jerk (kg)				Total
Rank	Athlete	Group	1	2	3	Rank	1	2	3	Rank	Total
1st place, gold medalist(s)	Akbar Djuraev (UZB)	A	189	193	196 CWR	1st place, gold medalist(s)	227	232	~~245~~	1st place, gold medalist(s)	428 CWR
2nd place, silver medalist(s)	Alireza Nassiri (IRI)	A	~~183~~	~~183~~	184 AJR	7	218	224	231 JWR	2nd place, silver medalist(s)	415 JWR
3rd place, bronze medalist(s)	Ruslan Nurudinov (UZB)	A	183	186	~~190~~	4	224	228	~~233~~	3rd place, bronze medalist(s)	414
4	Garik Karapetyan (ARM)	A	~~186~~	~~186~~	187	3rd place, bronze medalist(s)	220	~~224~~	~~224~~	6	407
5	Marcos Ruiz (ESP)	A	180	~~185~~	185	6	215	~~219~~	221	5	406
6	Hristo Hristov (BUL)	A	~~180~~	~~181~~	185	5	205	212	~~217~~	11	397
7	Kolbi Ferguson (USA)	B	~~173~~	~~173~~	174	13	~~215~~	215	222 AM	4	396
8	Siarhei Sharankou (AIN)	B	~~175~~	175	180	10	~~215~~	~~215~~	215	8	395
9	Chen Po-jen (TPE)	B	173	~~179~~	181	9	~~211~~	~~211~~	212	9	393
10	Jang Yeon-hak (KOR)	B	~~173~~	173	177	11	210	~~215~~	~~215~~	13	387
11	Dong Bing-cheng (TPE)	B	171	~~176~~	~~176~~	16	~~210~~	210	216	7	387
12	Abolfazl Zare (IRI)	B	166	172	176	12	~~208~~	~~209~~	210	14	386
13	Dadash Dadashbayli (AZE)	A	173	—	—	15	212	—	—	10	385
14	Viktor Kondratev (AIN)	B	~~173~~	173	~~180~~	14	~~210~~	~~210~~	210	15	383
15	Sultan Meiram (KAZ)	C	160	165	169	18	200	208	211	12	380
16	Artūrs Plēsnieks (LAT)	B	165	170	~~174~~	17	~~208~~	209	~~218~~	16	379
17	Ryunosuke Mochida (JPN)	C	~~162~~	163	168	19	202	~~210~~	~~210~~	19	370
18	Asem Al-Sallaj (JOR)	C	160	165	~~167~~	23	200	203	~~207~~	17	368
19	Ezzeddin Al-Ghafeer (UAE)	C	161	166	~~169~~	21	196	~~201~~	~~202~~	21	362
20	Mohammed Hamada (PLE)	D	160	165	~~170~~	22	190	~~196~~	196	20	361
21	Junior Ngadja Nyabeyeu (CMR)	D	~~154~~	154	~~160~~	28	195	202	~~207~~	18	356
22	Josué Medina (MEX)	C	155	~~160~~	~~160~~	26	190	~~195~~	196	22	351
23	Neilas Gineikis (LTU)	D	150	155	~~160~~	25	180	185	~~190~~	23	340
24	Arnas Šidiškis (LTU)	D	145	~~150~~	~~150~~	29	175	180	~~186~~	24	325
25	Jørgen Kjellevand (NOR)	D	130	135	140	30	160	~~167~~	~~167~~	25	300
26	Eric Kamande (KEN)	D	100	106	112	31	130	137	142	26	254
—	Aymen Bacha (TUN)	A	~~184~~	~~184~~	~~186~~	—	~~213~~	~~215~~	~~217~~	—	—
—	Simon Martirosyan (ARM)	A	~~185~~	~~185~~	~~187~~	—	—	—	—	—	—
—	Luis Lauret (ROU)	A	185	~~188~~	188	2nd place, silver medalist(s)	~~213~~	~~215~~	~~217~~	—	—
—	Muhammed Emin Burun (TUR)	B	~~173~~	~~173~~	~~173~~	—	—	—	—	—	—
—	Ali Shukurlu (AZE)	B	175	~~180~~	182	8	~~211~~	~~211~~	~~211~~	—	—
—	Artur Mugurdumov (ISR)	C	162	~~166~~	~~167~~	24	~~203~~	~~203~~	~~204~~	—	—
—	Hernán Viera (PER)	C	150	~~155~~	155	27	~~210~~	~~210~~	~~211~~	—	—
—	Xavier Lusignan (CAN)	C	160	166	~~170~~	20	~~200~~	~~201~~	~~202~~	—	—
—	Yevhenii Yantsevych (UKR)	C	Did not start								
—	Ryan Sester (USA)	C	Did not start								
X	Cyrille Tchatchet (CWF)	C	~~153~~	153	160	X	192	198	203	X	363
X	Andrew Griffiths (CWF)	D	155	~~160~~	~~160~~	X	~~178~~	178	~~184~~	X	333
X	Omar Keshta (CWF)	D	135	~~140~~	~~140~~	X	175	180	~~185~~	X	315
X	Henry Axon (CWF)	D	~~135~~	~~135~~	135	X	165	~~171~~	171	X	306
X	Oliver Dodds (CWF)	D	115	120	125	X	140	150	~~155~~	X	275
