= Alireza Yousefi =

Iranian weightlifter (born 2003)

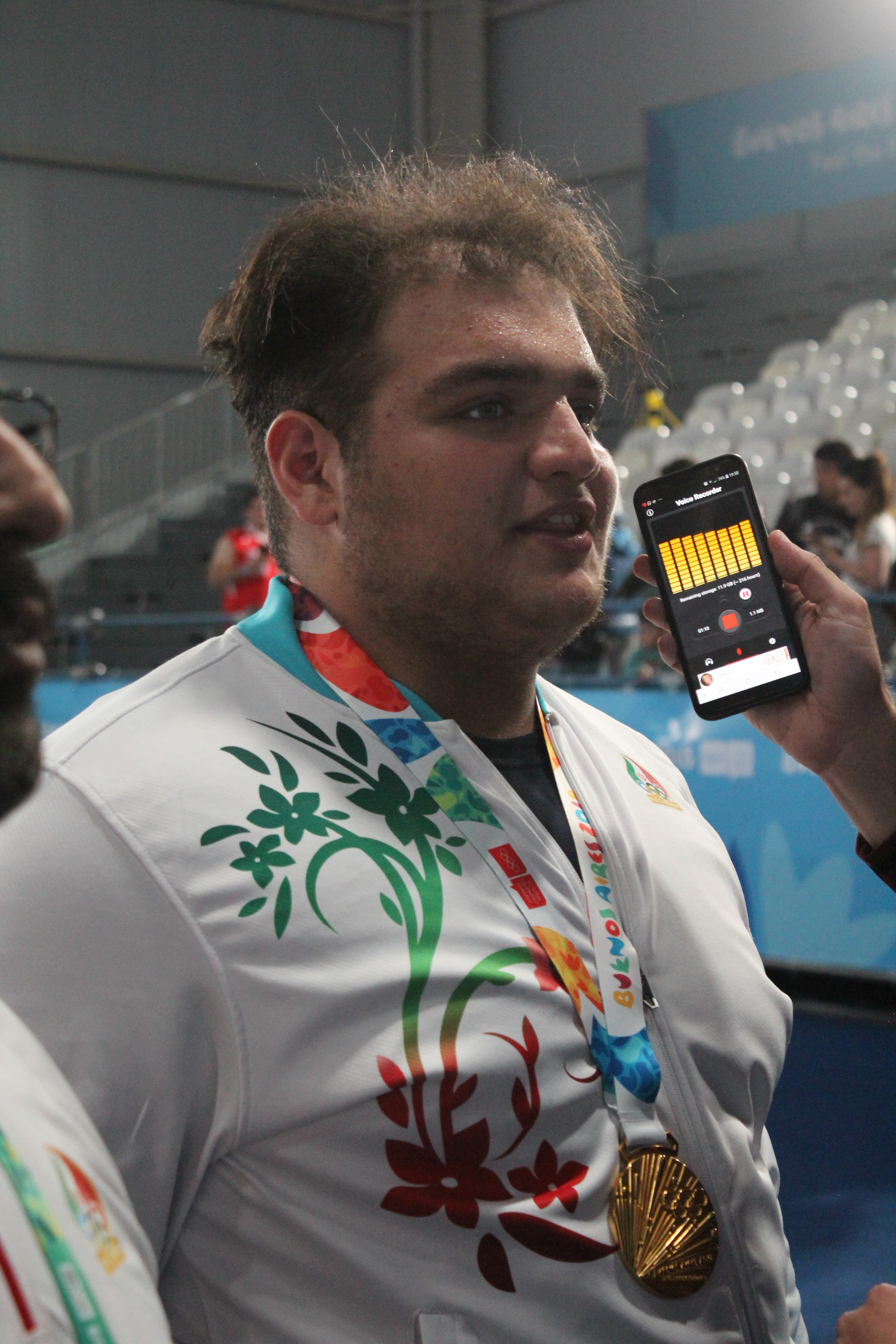
- Yousefi at the 2018 Summer Youth Olympics

Personal information
- Nationality: Iran
- Born: 27 August 2003 (age 23) Ghaemshahr, Mazandaran, Iran
- Weight: 199 kg (439 lb)

Sport
- Country: Iran
- Sport: Weightlifting
- Event: +110 kg

Achievements and titles
- Personal bests: Snatch: 195 kg (2026); Clean and jerk: 263 kg (2026); Total: 458 kg (2026)
Medal record
Representing Iran
Men's weightlifting
World Championships
Silver medal – second place	2026 Ningbo	+110 kg
Bronze medal – third place	2024 Manama	+109 kg
Asian Championships
Silver medal – second place	2026 Gandhinagar	+110 kg
Islamic Solidarity Games
Silver medal – second place	2021 Konya	+109 kg
World Junior Championships
Gold medal – first place	2022 Heraklion	+109 kg
Gold medal – first place	2023 Guadalajara	+109 kg
Bronze medal – third place	2019 Suva	+109 kg
Youth Olympic Games
Gold medal – first place	2018 Buenos Aires	+85 kg
Asian Youth Championships
Gold medal – first place	2018 Urgench	+94 kg

Alireza Yousefi (Persian: علیرضا یوسفی, born 27 August 2003) is an Iranian weightlifter, who won a gold medal at the 2018 Buenos Aires Youth Olympic Games.

In 2019, Yousefi competed at the 2019 World Junior Weightlifting Championships in the over 109 kg category setting 6 youth world records. In 2022, Yousefi became the world junior weightlifting champion and held the record for the world super-heavyweight clean & jerk in the junior category.

In 2024, Yousefi won the overall bronze medal at the 2024 World Weightlifting Championships, as well as the gold medal in the clean & jerk with 262 kilograms. In 2025, Yousefi underwent knee surgery on his right knee after tearing a ligament and meniscus and was out of action for the rest of the year. He returned in February 2026 at the Iranian Weightlifting Pro League, where he won the competition.

At the 2026 Asian Weightlifting Championships, Youseif clean & jerked a world record lift of 261 kilograms, claiming his first ever senior world record. He would secure an overall silver medal with 445 kilograms.

At the 2026 World Championship s he set a new world record with 263kg in the clean and jerk.

== Major results ==
Year	Venue	Weight	Snatch (kg)				Clean & jerk (kg)				Total	Rank
Year	Venue	Weight	1	2	3	Rank	1	2	3	Rank	Total	Rank
World Championships
2021	Tashkent, Uzbekistan	+109 kg	173	178	183	7	230	238	~~245~~	5	421	7
2024	Manama, Bahrain	+109 kg	184	~~191~~	194	5	248	258	262	1st place, gold medalist(s)	456	3rd place, bronze medalist(s)
2026	Ningbo, China	+110 kg	186	191	195	4	253	~~258~~	263 WR	1st place, gold medalist(s)	458	2nd place, silver medalist(s)
Asian Championships
2023	Jinju, South Korea	+109 kg	176	184	190	4	236	246 JWR	~~249~~	2nd place, silver medalist(s)	436	4
2026	Gandhinagar, India	+110 kg	177	184	~~189~~	3rd place, bronze medalist(s)	248	~~261~~	261 WR	1st place, gold medalist(s)	445	2nd place, silver medalist(s)
Islamic Solidarity Games
2022	Konya, Turkey	+109 kg	171	176	181	3rd place, bronze medalist(s)	230	~~241~~	~~241~~	2nd place, silver medalist(s)	411	2nd place, silver medalist(s)
Junior World Championships
2019	Suva, Fiji	+109 kg	156	163	171	4	212	225	~~233~~	2nd place, silver medalist(s)	396	3rd place, bronze medalist(s)
2022	Heraklion, Greece	+109 kg	166	171	177	1st place, gold medalist(s)	215	~~239~~	239	1st place, gold medalist(s)	416	1st place, gold medalist(s)
2023	Guadalajara, Mexico	+109 kg	173	180	--	1st place, gold medalist(s)	225	~~240~~	240	1st place, gold medalist(s)	420	1st place, gold medalist(s)
Youth Olympic Games
2018	Buenos Aires, Argentina	+85 kg	150	156	162	3	202	211	218	1	380	1st place, gold medalist(s)
Asian Youth Championships
2018	Urgench, Uzbekistan	+94 kg	136	141	144	1st place, gold medalist(s)	176	186	~~195~~	1st place, gold medalist(s)	330	1st place, gold medalist(s)
