= Weightlifting at the 2026 Asian Games – Men's 110 kg =

Men's 110 kg at the 2026 Asian Games
- Venue: Nagoya Trade & Industry Center
- Date: 27–29 September 2026
- Competitors: 11 from 11 nations

Medalists
gold medal	Akbar Djuraev	Uzbekistan
silver medal	Şahzadbek Matýakubow	Turkmenistan
bronze medal	Liu Huanhua	China

The men's 110 kilograms competition at the 2026 Asian Games was held on 27 and 29 September 2026 at the Nagoya Trade & Industry Center.

== Schedule ==
All times are Japan Standard Time (UTC+09:00)

Date	Time	Event
Sunday, 27 September 2026	10:00	Group B
Tuesday, 29 September 2026	12:30	Group A

== Records ==
Prior to this competition, the existing world, Asian and Games records were as follows.

World Record	Snatch	Akbar Djuraev (UZB)	196 kg	Førde, Norway	10 October 2025
World Record	Clean & Jerk	World Standard	237 kg	—	1 June 2025
World Record	Total	Akbar Djuraev (UZB)	428 kg	Førde, Norway	10 October 2025
Asian Record	Snatch	Akbar Djuraev (UZB)	196 kg	Førde, Norway	10 October 2025
Asian Record	Clean & Jerk	Asian Standard	237 kg	—	1 June 2025
Asian Record	Total	Akbar Djuraev (UZB)	428 kg	Førde, Norway	10 October 2025
Games Record	Snatch	Asian Games Standard	188 kg	—	1 August 2026
Games Record	Clean & Jerk	Asian Games Standard	225 kg	—	1 August 2026
Games Record	Total	Asian Games Standard	409 kg	—	1 August 2026

== Results ==
Legend

- NM — No mark

Rank	Athlete	Group	Snatch (kg)				Clean & Jerk (kg)				Total
Rank	Athlete	Group	1	2	3	Result	1	2	3	Result	Total
1st place, gold medalist(s)	Akbar Djuraev (UZB)	A	190	195	197	197	226	—	—	226	423
2nd place, silver medalist(s)	Şahzadbek Matýakubow (TKM)	A	180	184	188	188	~~217~~	~~222~~	222	222	410
3rd place, bronze medalist(s)	Liu Huanhua (CHN)	A	170	180	185	185	210	220	~~226~~	220	405
4	Alireza Nassiri (IRI)	A	180	~~185~~	~~185~~	180	223	~~231~~	~~231~~	223	403
5	Ryunosuke Mochida (JPN)	B	160	165	170	170	201	206	210	210	380
6	Jin Yun-seong (KOR)	B	~~165~~	165	171	171	195	~~200~~	~~201~~	195	366
7	Mohammed Hamada (PLE)	B	130	140	~~145~~	140	150	~~156~~	160	160	300
8	Akbarzhon Ghafurov (TJK)	B	~~125~~	125	131	131	155	~~161~~	~~161~~	155	286
—	Ali Al-Khazal (KSA)	A	170	~~174~~	~~175~~	170	~~204~~	~~204~~	—	—	NM
—	Chen Po-jen (TPE)	A	185	189	~~195~~	189	~~220~~	~~222~~	~~222~~	—	NM
—	Asem Al-Sallaj (JOR)	B	161	~~166~~	~~166~~	161	—	—	—	—	NM

== New records ==
The following records were established during the competition.

Snatch	189	Chen Po-jen (TPE)	GR
Snatch	190	Akbar Djuraev (UZB)	GR
Snatch	195	Akbar Djuraev (UZB)	GR
Snatch	197	Akbar Djuraev (UZB)	WR
Clean & Jerk	226	Akbar Djuraev (UZB)	GR
Total	423	Akbar Djuraev (UZB)	GR
