= 2026 World Weightlifting Championships – Men's 110 kg =

Men's 110 kg at the 2026 World Weightlifting Championships
- Venue: Ningbo Olympic Sports Center
- Location: Ningbo, China
- Dates: 6 November
- Competitors: 30 from 28 nations
- Winning total: 432 kg WR

Medalists
gold medal	Akbar Djuraev	Uzbekistan
silver medal	Alireza Nassiri	Iran
bronze medal	Şahzadbek Matýakubow	Turkmenistan

The men's 110 kilograms competition at the 2026 World Weightlifting Championships was held on 6 November 2026.

== Schedule ==
Date	Time	Event
6 November 2026	11:00	Group C
6 November 2026	16:30	Group B
6 November 2026	19:00	Group A

== Records ==
Prior to this competition, the existing world records were as follows.

World record	Snatch	Akbar Djuraev (UZB)	197 kg	Nagoya, Japan	29 September 2026
World record	Clean & Jerk	World Standard	237 kg	—	1 June 2025
World record	Total	Akbar Djuraev (UZB)	428 kg	Førde, Norway	10 October 2025

== Results ==
Rank	Athlete	Group	Snatch (kg)				Clean & Jerk (kg)				Total
Rank	Athlete	Group	1	2	3	Rank	1	2	3	Rank	Total
1st place, gold medalist(s)	Akbar Djuraev (UZB)	A	190	195	198; WR	1st place, gold medalist(s)	228	234	~~238~~	1st place, gold medalist(s)	432; WR
2nd place, silver medalist(s)	Alireza Nassiri (IRI)	A	~~180~~	181	185	6	226	233	~~235~~	2nd place, silver medalist(s)	418
3rd place, bronze medalist(s)	Şahzadbek Matýakubow (TKM)	A	~~180~~	183	187	4	215	~~224~~	230	3rd place, bronze medalist(s)	417
4	Luis Lauret (ROU)	A	190	194	~~198~~	2nd place, silver medalist(s)	216	222	~~226~~	7	416
5	Chen Po-jen (TPE)	B	185	191	~~194~~	3rd place, bronze medalist(s)	210	219	~~226~~	8	410
6	Liu Huanhua (CHN)	B	175	180	~~185~~	10	215	225	~~231~~	6	405
7	Kolbi Ferguson (USA)	A	170	~~175~~	~~175~~	17	217	223	227	4	397
8	Artyom Antropov (KAZ)	A	166	167	~~175~~	19	226	~~230~~	~~231~~	5	393
9	Sarmat Tebloev (RUS)	A	175	181	~~186~~	8	206	211	~~215~~	12	392
10	Joen Vikingsson Sjöblom (SWE)	B	169	173	176	12	202	208	214	9	390
11	Ahmed Gamal (EGY)	A	175	180	~~184~~	11	210	~~214~~	~~214~~	13	390
12	Alireza Moeini (IRI)	B	180	~~186~~	~~187~~	9	202	208	~~212~~	14	388
13	Ryunosuke Mochida (JPN)	B	166	170	174	13	206	211	~~215~~	11	385
14	Gurami Vekua (GEO)	B	164	168	~~171~~	18	204	208	212	10	380
15	Taniela Rainibogi (FIJ)	B	165	170	~~175~~	16	205	~~210~~	~~210~~	15	375
16	Cyrille Tchatchet (GBR)	C	160	165	170	15	~~200~~	~~200~~	201	16	371
17	Josef Kolář (CZE)	C	160	~~164~~	166	20	195	200	~~206~~	18	366
18	Josué Medina (MEX)	B	~~165~~	165	~~170~~	22	200	~~205~~	~~207~~	19	365
19	Artur Mugurdumov (ISR)	C	156	161	~~165~~	23	195	~~201~~	~~205~~	20	356
20	Hernán Viera (PER)	C	144	~~148~~	~~148~~	26	190	200	~~206~~	17	344
21	Neilas Gineikis (LTU)	C	150	156	~~161~~	24	~~185~~	185	—	22	341
22	Victor Sundh (SWE)	C	145	~~150~~	~~150~~	25	190	~~197~~	~~200~~	21	335
23	Eric Kamande (KEN)	C	~~105~~	105	~~110~~	28	137	~~142~~	~~142~~	24	242
—	Garik Karapetyan (ARM)	A	183	~~188~~	~~188~~	7	~~217~~	~~217~~	—	—	—
—	Hristo Hristov (BUL)	A	~~180~~	180	186	5	~~210~~	~~210~~	~~210~~	—	—
—	Asem Al-Sallaj (JOR)	B	165	~~170~~	~~170~~	21	~~200~~	~~200~~	~~200~~	—	—
—	Marcin Ziółkowski (POL)	B	~~170~~	~~170~~	173	14	~~200~~	~~200~~	~~202~~	—	—
—	Þórbergur Ernir Hlynsson (ISL)	C	~~144~~	~~144~~	~~144~~	—	172	~~181~~	~~182~~	23	—
—	Cheung Ka Lok (HKG)	C	~~130~~	130	~~135~~	27	~~170~~	~~172~~	~~172~~	—	—
—	Seamus O'Conchubhair (IRL)	C	~~137~~	~~137~~	~~137~~	—	—	—	—	—	—
—	Ali Al-Khazal (KSA)	B	Did not start								
—	Junior Ngadja Nyabeyeu (CMR)	C	Did not start								
