= Karate at the 2026 Asian Games – Men's kumite 75 kg =

Men's kumite 75 kg at the 2026 Asian Games
- Venue: Toyohashi City General Gymnasium
- Date: 22 September 2026
- Competitors: 10 from 10 nations

Medalists
gold medal	Morteza Nemati	Iran
silver medal	Dawut Nazmyradow	Turkmenistan
bronze medal	Nurkanat Azhikanov	Kazakhstan
bronze medal	Fawaz Bani Al-Marjeh	Syria

The men's kumite 75 kilograms competition at the 2026 Asian Games took place on 22 September 2026 at Toyohashi City General Gymnasium, Toyohashi.

== Schedule ==
All times are Japan Standard Time (UTC+09:00)

Date	Time	Event
Tuesday, 22 September 2026	14:25	Round of 16
Tuesday, 22 September 2026	14:25	Quarterfinals
Tuesday, 22 September 2026	14:25	Semifinals
Tuesday, 22 September 2026	14:25	Bronze medal bouts
Tuesday, 22 September 2026	16:00	Final

== Results ==
Legend

- K — Won by kiken

=== Main bracket ===
Round of 16
Alwyn Batican (PHI)	3^{K}
Omar Al-Jenaei (KUW)	3
Nazim Nurlanov (KGZ)	4
Isaiah Tang (SGP)	3

Quarterfinals
Alwyn Batican (PHI)	5
Xu Jia Cheng (MAC)	4
Morteza Nemati (IRI)	8
Nurkanat Azhikanov (KAZ)	0
Nazim Nurlanov (KGZ)	2
Dawut Nazmyradow (TKM)	7
Fawaz Bani Al-Marjeh (SYR)	11
An Gwang-min (KOR)	2

Semifinals
Alwyn Batican (PHI)	2
Morteza Nemati (IRI)	8
Dawut Nazmyradow (TKM)	0
Fawaz Bani Al-Marjeh (SYR)	0

Final
Morteza Nemati (IRI)	4
Dawut Nazmyradow (TKM)	3

=== Repechage ===
Bronze medal bouts
Nurkanat Azhikanov (KAZ)	10
Alwyn Batican (PHI)	1
Nazim Nurlanov (KGZ)	8
Fawaz Bani Al-Marjeh (SYR)	18
