= 2026 World Weightlifting Championships – Men's +110 kg =

Men's +110 kg at the 2026 World Weightlifting Championships
- Venue: Ningbo Olympic Sports Center
- Location: Ningbo, China
- Dates: 7–8 November
- Competitors: 29 from 24 nations
- Winning total: 466 kg

Medalists
gold medal	Ali Ammar	Iraq
silver medal	Alireza Yousefi	Iran
bronze medal	Varazdat Lalayan	Armenia

The men's +110 kilograms competition at the 2026 World Weightlifting Championships was held on 7 and 8 November 2026.

== Schedule ==
Date	Time	Event
7 November 2026	11:00	Group C
7 November 2026	16:30	Group B
8 November 2026	14:00	Group A

== Records ==
Prior to this competition, the existing world records were as follows.

World record	Snatch	Ali Ammar (IRQ)	219 kg	Nagoya, Japan	29 September 2026
World record	Clean & Jerk	Alireza Yousefi (IRI)	261 kg	Gandhinagar, India	17 May 2026
World record	Total	World Standard	477 kg	—	1 June 2025

== Results ==
Rank	Athlete	Group	Snatch (kg)				Clean & Jerk (kg)				Total
Rank	Athlete	Group	1	2	3	Rank	1	2	3	Rank	Total
1st place, gold medalist(s)	Ali Ammar (IRQ)	A	206	211	~~220~~	1st place, gold medalist(s)	240	250	255	2nd place, silver medalist(s)	466
2nd place, silver medalist(s)	Alireza Yousefi (IRI)	A	186	191	195	4	253	~~258~~	263; WR	1st place, gold medalist(s)	458
3rd place, bronze medalist(s)	Varazdat Lalayan (ARM)	A	205	210	~~214~~	2nd place, silver medalist(s)	247	~~252~~	~~257~~	3rd place, bronze medalist(s)	457
4	Ali Davoudi (IRI)	A	200	206	~~210~~	3rd place, bronze medalist(s)	246	~~261~~	~~261~~	4	452
5	Daniil Vagaitsev (RUS)	A	185	190	194	5	225	232	237	5	431
6	Bohdan Taranenko (UKR)	A	185	190	~~195~~	8	226	232	~~242~~	6	422
7	Sharofiddin Amriddinov (UZB)	A	185	190	~~195~~	7	220	226	~~230~~	10	416
8	Hwang Woo-man (KOR)	B	~~190~~	~~190~~	190	6	225	~~230~~	~~230~~	11	415
9	Rafael Cerro (COL)	A	185	~~191~~	~~192~~	9	220	230	~~235~~	8	415
10	Song Yeong-hwan (KOR)	B	175	180	~~183~~	10	231	~~240~~	—	7	411
11	Aaron Williams (USA)	A	180	~~185~~	~~188~~	12	225	~~232~~	~~232~~	12	405
12	Vladyslav Prylypko (UKR)	B	~~170~~	170	175	14	221	229	~~235~~	9	404
13	Dong Bing-cheng (TPE)	B	175	180	~~185~~	11	~~215~~	215	223	13	403
14	Ragnar Holme (NOR)	A	177	~~182~~	~~183~~	13	~~217~~	217	~~223~~	16	394
15	Moayad Al-Najjar (UAE)	B	172	~~178~~	~~178~~	15	215	~~222~~	~~222~~	18	387
16	Kentaro Sawanobori (JPN)	B	~~165~~	165	~~170~~	20	220	~~230~~	~~230~~	15	385
17	Kamil Kučera (CZE)	B	165	~~170~~	~~170~~	19	210	216	~~221~~	17	381
18	Karolis Stonkus (LTU)	C	~~155~~	155	160	23	208	214	220	14	380
19	Lovepreet Singh (IND)	B	~~170~~	170	~~174~~	16	~~205~~	205	~~213~~	21	375
20	Alonso Bizama (CHI)	C	160	166	~~170~~	17	201	207	~~211~~	19	373
21	Karim Saadi (MEX)	C	~~165~~	165	~~170~~	18	195	200	205	20	370
22	Jin Cheng (TPE)	C	150	155	160	22	190	195	200	22	360
23	Hanno Keskitalo (FIN)	C	~~162~~	162	~~167~~	21	183	~~187~~	~~187~~	25	345
24	Hugo Ottosson (SWE)	C	~~150~~	150	~~155~~	25	190	~~196~~	~~196~~	24	340
25	Cian Nowlan Rooney (IRL)	C	145	~~149~~	~~151~~	27	~~193~~	195	~~203~~	23	340
26	Sikoti Manumua (TGA)	C	144	149	~~153~~	26	176	~~181~~	~~186~~	26	325
—	David Liti (NZL)	B	160	~~165~~	~~165~~	24	—	—	—	—	—
—	Keiser Witte (USA)	B	~~180~~	~~180~~	~~180~~	—	—	—	—	—	—
—	Bilal Bouamr (MAR)	C	~~155~~	—	—	—	—	—	—	—	—
—	Saud Al-Rabah (KUW)	C	Did not start								
