= Şahzadbek Matýakubow =

Turkmenistan weightlifter (born 2004)

Personal information
- Born: 1 March 2004 (age 22) Akdepe District, Daşoguz Province, Turkmenistan

Sport
- Country: Turkmenistan
- Sport: Weightlifting
- Event: –110 kg (Note: formerly –81, –96 and –102 kg)
Medal record
Men's weightlifting
Representing Turkmenistan
World Championships
Bronze medal – third place	2026 Ningbo	110 kg
Asian Games
Silver medal – second place	2026 Aichi–Nagoya	110 kg
World Junior Championships
Gold medal – first place	2024 León	102 kg
Silver medal – second place	2023 Guadalajara	96 kg
Asian Junior Championships
Gold medal – first place	2023 Delhi	96 kg
Gold medal – first place	2024 Doha	102 kg

Şahzadbek Matýakubow (Note: Also spelled as Shahzadbek Matyakubov.) (born 1 March 2004) is a Turkmenistan weightlifter currently competing in the men's 110 kg category. He is a silver medalist at the Asian Games.

== Career ==
In 2022, Matýakubow competed in the Asian Youth & Junior Championships in the junior 81 kg category and the World Weightlifting Championships in the 89 kg category.

At the 2023 Asian Youth & Junior Weightlifting Championships, held in Delhi, India, Matýakubow competed in the 96 kg category and won a gold medal with a total of 357 kilograms, lifted 160 kilograms in the snatch and 197 kilograms in the clean and jerk. In November 2023, at the Junior World Championships in Guadalajara, Mexico, he won a silver medal with a total of 367 kilograms in the 96 kg category. In the snatch, he lifted 167 kilograms, and in the clean and jerk, he managed 200 kilograms. The following month, he also competed in the 2023 IWF Grand Prix II held in Doha, Qatar, where he won a gold medal overall a total of 371 kg in the 96 kg category. In the snatch, he lifted 167 kilograms and won a gold medal, while in the clean and jerk, he lifted 204 kilograms and won a silver medal.

In September 2024, at the World Junior Championships in León, Spain, Matýakubow won a gold medal with a total of 391 kilograms in the 102 kg category. In the snatch, he lifted 175 kilograms, and in the clean and jerk, he lifted 216 kilograms, setting a junior world record in the process. At the 2024 Asian Youth & Junior Weightlifting Championships, held in Doha, Qatar, hecompeted in the 102 kg category and won a gold medal with a total of 396 kilograms, lifted 177 kilograms in the snatch and 219 kilograms in the clean and jerk.

At the 2026 Asian Games in Nagoya, Matýakubow won a silver medal with a total of 410 kilograms in the 110 kg category. In the snatch, he lifted 188 kilograms, and in the clean and jerk, he managed 222 kilograms. In November 2026, at the World Weightlifting Championships, Matýakubow won a bronze medal with a total of 432 kilograms in the 110 kg category, lifting 187 kilograms in the snatch and 230 kilograms in the clean and jerk.
