= Alireza Nassiri (weightlifter) =

Iranian weightlifter (born 2005)

Personal information
- Native name: علیرضا نصیری
- Born: 14 December 2005 (age 20)

Sport
- Country: Iran
- Sport: Weightlifting
- Weight class: 110 kg
Medal record
Men's weightlifting
Representing Iran
World Championships
Silver medal – second place	2025 Førde	110 kg
Silver medal – second place	2026 Ningbo	110 kg

Alireza Nassiri (Persian: علیرضا نصیری; born 14 December 2005) is an Iranian weightlifter.

== Career ==
In August 2023, Nassiri competed at the 2023 Asian Junior Championships and won a silver medal in the 96 kg event. He opened the event with 156 kg in the snatch. He followed it up with 196 kg in the clean and jerk, before finishing with a total lift of 352 kg. In November 2023, he competed at the 2023 Junior World Weightlifting Championships and won a gold medal in the 96 kg category. He opened the event with 166 kg in the snatch. He followed it up with 205 kg in the clean and jerk, before finishing with a total lift of 371 kg.

In May 2025, he competed at the 2025 World Junior Championships and won a gold medal in the 109 kg event. He opened the event with 180 kg in the snatch. He followed it up with 220 kg in the clean and jerk, before finishing with a total lift of 400 kg. In October 2025, he competed at the 2025 World Weightlifting Championships and won a silver medal in the 110 kg event. He opened the event with 184 kg in the snatch, setting an Asian junior record. He followed it up with 231 kg in the clean and jerk, before finishing with a total lift of 415 kg. He set junior world records in the clean and jerk and total.

In May 2026, he competed at the 2026 Asian Weightlifting Championships and won a gold medal in the clean and jerk with a lift of 231 kg. In September 2026, he competed at the 2026 Asian Games and finished in fourth place in the 110 kg event. He opened the event with 180 kg in the snatch. He followed it up with 223 kg in the clean and jerk, before finishing with a total lift of 403 kg.
