= Boxing at the 2018 Asian Games – Women's 51 kg =

Boxing competitions

Women's 51 kg at the 2018 Asian Games
- Venue: Jakarta International Expo
- Date: 24 August – 1 September 2018
- Competitors: 18 from 18 nations

Medalists
gold medal	Chang Yuan	China
silver medal	Pang Chol-mi	North Korea
bronze medal	Lin Yu-ting	Chinese Taipei
bronze medal	Nguyễn Thị Tâm	Vietnam

The women's flyweight (51 kilograms) event at the 2018 Asian Games took place from 24 August to 1 September 2018 at Jakarta International Expo Hall, Jakarta, Indonesia.

In the final, Chinese boxer Chang defeated North Korean boxer Pang by a split decision of 3–2. Pang was the more aggressive boxer throughout the bout and the verdict came as a shock to the Korean side. They protested inside the ring. Eventually the security personnels were required to remove them from the ring. Many of the spectators also thought Pang was the clear winner, so they booed the verdict and the boos continued even during the medal distribution ceremony. North Korea challenged the verdict. Though the verdict was not overturned, AIBA restored the right to challenge a verdict of the boxing bouts in future amateur boxing tournaments.

== Schedule ==
All times are Western Indonesia Time (UTC+07:00)

Date	Time	Event
Friday, 24 August 2018	14:00	Round of 32
Sunday, 26 August 2018	13:00	Round of 16
Wednesday, 29 August 2018	13:00	Quarterfinals
Friday, 31 August 2018	14:00	Semifinals
Saturday, 1 September 2018	14:00	Final

== Results ==
Legend

- RSC — Won by referee stop contest

=== Final ===
Final
Chang Yuan (CHN)	3
Pang Chol-mi (PRK)	2

=== Top half ===
Round of 32
Lin Yu-ting (TPE)	5
Aldriani Beatrichx Sugoro (INA)	0

Round of 16
Daomayuly Chantilath (LAO)
Lin Yu-ting (TPE)	RSC
Nazym Kyzaibay (KAZ)	RSC
Razia Bano Aziz (PAK)
Sarjubala Devi (IND)	5
Madina Ghaforova (TJK)	0
Chang Yuan (CHN)	RSC
Tandin Lhamo (BHU)

Quarterfinals
Lin Yu-ting (TPE)	4
Nazym Kyzaibay (KAZ)	1
Sarjubala Devi (IND)	0
Chang Yuan (CHN)	5

Semifinals
Lin Yu-ting (TPE)	1
Chang Yuan (CHN)	4

=== Bottom half ===
Round of 32
Chuthamat Raksat (THA)	1
Pang Chol-mi (PRK)	4

Round of 16
Ochirbatyn Jargalan (MGL)	4
Bimala Shrestha (NEP)	1
Nguyễn Thị Tâm (VIE)	5
Nam Eun-jin (KOR)	0
Anusha Koddithuwakku (SRI)	1
Madoka Wada (JPN)	4
Pang Chol-mi (PRK)	5
Irish Magno (PHI)	0

Quarterfinals
Ochirbatyn Jargalan (MGL)	0
Nguyễn Thị Tâm (VIE)	5
Madoka Wada (JPN)
Pang Chol-mi (PRK)	RSC

Semifinals
Nguyễn Thị Tâm (VIE)	0
Pang Chol-mi (PRK)	4
