= Gabriela Celeste Alaniz =

Argentine woman boxer

Personal information
- Nickname: La Chucky
- Born: 28 June 1996 (age 30) Buenos Aires, Argentina
- Height: 5 ft 3 in (160 cm)
- Weight: Flyweight

Boxing career
- Stance: Orthodox

Boxing record
- Total fights: 17
- Wins: 15
- Win by KO: 6
- Losses: 2

Gabriela Celeste Alaniz (born June 28, 1996) is an Argentine professional boxer who was the WBA, WBC, WBO and The Ring female world flyweight champion.

== Professional boxing career ==
Alaniz began her professional boxing career by debuting on May 25, 2018, at the age of 21, when she defeated the 1 win, 2 losses Maria Elizabeth Sanchez by a four-rounds unanimous decision at the FAB stadium in Buenos Aires.

Her second fight was her first in her adopted hometown of Merlo. In that contest, she beat previously undefeated, the 2 wins, 0 losses and 1 draw (tie) Aixa Adema by a six-rounds unanimous decision.

Alaniz won four more contests, all by decision, before she challenged for her first professional title: She boxed Anyelen Loreley Espinosa for the FAB's vacant, national women's flyweight title. Alaniz faced Espinosa on Saturday, 29 February 2020 at the Club Atletico Lanus in Lanus, Argentina. In her first professional championship fight, Alaniz also scored her first knockout as a professional boxer, as she dropped Espinosa in round one before winning by stoppage in round four. That win was followed by five more victories before she challenged for the WBO world championship. Three of those fights were knockout or technical knockout wins, but none were in defense of her national title. One was a rematch victory over Aixa Adema, who by now sported a record of 3 wins, 5 losses and 2 draws, in a contest held as part of a program headlined by a fight between Maira Moneo and Ana Romina Guichapani, Alaniz being triumphant by an eight-rounds unanimous decision.

== World champion ==
On June 18, 2022, Alaniz fought Tamara Elisabet DeMarco, for DeMarco's WBO world flyweight championship, in a fight that was televised to the Americas by TyC Sports' weekends boxing show, Boxeo de Primera. DeMarco had 10 wins and 4 losses in 14 professional contests before their fight. Alaniz, however, dominated the contest, dropping the champion twice in the first round and controlling the bout's pace until the champion's corner threw in their towel after the bell to start round seven had sounded, signifying that they were stopping the fight, and giving Alaniz her first world boxing championship by way of a seventh-round technical knockout. The fight was held in front of Alaniz' hometown fans at the Club Ferro Carril Oeste in Merlo.

On September 24, 2022, Alaniz made the first defense of her world championship, dominating Venezuelan challenger Debora Rengifo, 18-9-1 with 10 knockouts before their contest, dropping Rengifo in round seven, on her way to a ninth round technical knockout victory. The fight was also telecast on Boxeo de Primera.

=== Alaniz vs. Esparza ===
On July 8, 2023, Alaniz fought to unify her WBO world Flyweight title with the WBA and WBC ones by facing Marlen Esparza of the United States at the AT&T Center in Esparza's hometown of San Antonio, Texas. After a close contest, she was declared loser by a ten-rounds majority decision, with scores of a 99-91 and 97-93 against her and a 95-95 tie. She lost her WBO world Flyweight title in this test.

=== Alaniz vs. Esparza 2 ===
Alaniz beat Marlen Esparza by split decision to win the WBC, WBO, WBA and Ring female world flyweight titles at Save Mart Arena, Fresno, California on 27 April 2024.

=== Alaniz vs. Fundora ===
Fundora was scheduled to face Gabriela Fundora for the undisputed flyweight title in Las Vegas on November 2, 2024. She lost by stoppage in the seventh round.

== Professional boxing record ==
17 fights	15 wins	2 losses
By knockout	6	1
By decision	9	1

No.	Result	Record	Opponent	Type	Round, time	Date	Location	Notes
17	Loss	15–2	Gabriela Fundora	TKO	7 (10)	2024-11-02	The Theater at Virgin Hotels, Paradise, Nevada, U.S.	For IBF flyweight title; Lost WBA, WBC, WBO & The Ring flyweight titles
16	Win	15–1	Marlen Esparza	SD	10 (10)	2024-04-27	Save Mart Center, Fresno, California, U.S.	Won vacant WBA, WBC, WBO & The Ring flyweight titles; Esparza stripped of titles for failing to make weight
15	Loss	14–1	Marlen Esparza	MD	10 (10)	2023-07-08	AT&T Center, San Antonio, Texas, U.S.	Lost WBO flyweight title; For WBA, WBC & The Ring flyweight titles
14	Win	14–0	Debora Rengifo	TKO	9 (10)	2022-09-24	Club Ferro Carril Midland, Libertad, Argentina	Retained WBO flyweight title
13	Win	13–0	Tamara Elisabet DeMarco	TKO	7 (10)	2022-06-18	Club Ferro Carril Oeste, Merlo, Argentina	Won WBO flyweight title
12	Win	12–0	Johana Zuniga	TKO	4 (10)	2022-01-22	El Remanso Deportivo, Merlo, Argentina	Won vacant WBO Latino flyweight title
11	Win	11–0	Maria Sol Baumstarh	UD	8 (8)	2021-08-21	Centro Cultural y Polideportivo, Los Hornos, Argentina	
10	Win	10–0	Daniela Gisele Molina	TKO	5 (6)	2021-04-10	Club Atlético Talleres, Villa Gobernador Gálvez, Argentina	
9	Win	9–0	Aixa Adema	UD	8 (8)	2021-02-13	Complejo Multifuncion, Pérez, Argentina	
8	Win	8–0	Roxana Ayelen Bermudez	TKO	5 (8)	2020-12-04	Asociacion Bomberos Voluntarios, Zavalla, Argentina	
7	Win	7–0	Anyelen Loreley Espinosa	TKO	4 (10)	2020-02-29	Club Atlético Lanús, Lanús, Argentina	Won vacant Argentine flyweight title
6	Win	6–0	Adriana Lorena Gisele Maldonado	UD	6 (6)	2019-10-19	Gimnasio JCL, Merlo, Argentina	
5	Win	5–0	Maria Sol Baumstarh	UD	4 (4)	2019-07-20	Club Ferro Carril Midland, Libertad, Argentina	
4	Win	4–0	Romina Belen Gorosito	UD	4 (4)	2019-06-15	Gimnasio JCL, Merlo, Argentina	
3	Win	3–0	Daniela Gisele Molina	UD	4 (4)	2018-12-28	Club Once Rayos, Merlo, Argentina	
2	Win	2–0	Aixa Adema	UD	6 (6)	2018-09-15	Club Independiente, Merlo, Argentina	
1	Win	1–0	Maria Elizabeth Sanchez	UD	4 (4)	2018-05-25	Estadio F.A.B., Buenos Aires, Argentina	

== See also ==
- List of female boxers

Sporting positions
Regional boxing titles
Vacant Title last held by Débora Anahí López	Argentine female flyweight champion February 29, 2020 – June 18, 2022; Won world title	Vacant Title next held by Jennifer Sabrina Meza
New title	WBO Latino female flyweight champion January 22, 2022 – June 18, 2022; Won world title	Vacant Title next held by Eveling Junieth Ortega
World boxing titles
Preceded by Tamara Elisabet DeMarco	WBO female flyweight champion June 18, 2022 – July 8, 2023	Succeeded by Marlen Esparza
Vacant Title last held by Marlen Esparza; Stripped, did not make weight	WBA female flyweight champion April 27, 2024 – November 2, 2024	Succeeded by Gabriela Fundora
Vacant Title last held by Marlen Esparza; Stripped, did not make weight	WBC female flyweight champion April 27, 2024 – November 2, 2024	Succeeded by Gabriela Fundora
Vacant Title last held by Marlen Esparza; Stripped, did not make weight	WBO female flyweight champion April 27, 2024 – November 2, 2024	Succeeded by Gabriela Fundora
Vacant Title last held by Marlen Esparza; Stripped, did not make weight	The Ring female flyweight champion April 27, 2024 – November 2, 2024	Succeeded by Gabriela Fundora
