= Tamara Elisabet DeMarco =

Argentine woman boxer

Personal information
- Born: Tamara Elisabet DeMarco; August 6, 1988 (age 37) Saladillo, Buenos Aires, Argentina
- Weight: Flyweight

Boxing career

Boxing record
- Total fights: 17
- Wins: 11
- Win by KO: 0
- Losses: 7
- Draws: 0
- No contests: 0

Tamara Elisabet DeMarco (born August 6, 1988) is an Argentine female professional boxer from Saladillo, Buenos Aires. From March 19, 2022, to June 18 of the same year, she was the World Boxing Organization's female world Flyweight champion.

== Professional boxing career ==
DeMarco debuted on June 10, 2017, defeating Rosa Maria Salazar, a 2 wins, 4 losses fighter, by a four rounds unanimous decision. DeMarco won her first seven bouts, all by decision, before facing Ayelen Micaela Alejandra Granadino, who was undefeated in two previous bouts and who defeated DeMarco by six rounds majority decision at the Club Jacobo Orso in Saladillo, on December 8, 2018. After losing to Kim Clavel by eight rounds unanimous decision on May 17, 2019, at the Montreal Casino in Montreal, Canada, DeMarco challenged Granadino in a rematch, this time for the Federacion Argentina de Boxeo's (FAB) national female light-flyweight title, on September 7, 2019, at the Club Atletico in Lanus. By this time, Granadino had 4 wins and 2 draws (ties) in six professional bouts. DeMarco was again outpointed by Granadino, again by a majority decision, this time over ten rounds. Then, DeMarco fought Amira Hamzaoui for the World Boxing Federation's vacant International Flyweight title on December 7 of the same year (2019) at Epernay, France. DeMarco won the international championship with a ten rounds unanimous decision.

DeMarco's first world championship fight came on her next fight, which came on June 4, 2021, after her career, like that of most boxers worldwide, was sidelined by the onset of the COVID-19 pandemic during 2020. That night, DeMarco faced undefeated, 13 wins and one draw (tie) Evelin Nazarena Bermudez for Bermudez's International Boxing Federation's female world light-flyweight title at the Complejo Deportivo Municipal Emilio Latuf in Rosario, Argentina. DeMarco was dropped in round two and was stopped for the first time in her career when she lost by a ninth-round technical knockout.

=== World champion ===
DeMarco's next contest took place on March 19, 2022, as part of a boxing program that was televised to Argentina and the rest of the Americas by TyC Sports' weekends' night boxing show, Boxeo de Primera. For that fight, DeMarco went up in weight by one category, climbing from the light (or junior) flyweight division to the flyweight one. In the contest, she faced then undefeated, 20 wins and 1 tie Débora Anahí López for Lopez's World Boxing Organization's (WBO) female world flyweight championship. In an intense fight with many hard punch exchanges, DeMarco was deducted one point in round five by the contest's referee, and then in the ninth round, a clash of heads caused a deep cut on Lopez's head and she was deemed unable to continue by a ringside doctor. Because the injury was caused by a headbutt and not by a punch, the fight's outcome was decided by the three judges' scorecards, and two of the three judges at ringside had DeMarco ahead at the moment the fight was stopped, thus DeMarco became the WBO's female world flyweight champion by a nine rounds split technical decision. This contest took place at the Club Atletico Social y Deportivo Camioneros, at Luis Guillon, Buenos Aires, Argentina.

On June 18 of the same year, DeMarco was dethroned as world champion, when she was defeated by Gabriela Celeste Alaniz (12–0, 4 knockout wins coming into their bout) by a seventh-round technical knockout at Merlo, Buenos Aires, Argentina. DeMarco was dropped twice in round one of this contest. This fight was also televised to Argentina and the Americas on "Boxeo de Primera".

== See also ==
- List of Argentines
