= Philippines at the 2024 Summer Olympics =

Sporting event delegation

- IOC code: PHI
- NOC: Philippine Olympic Committee
- Website: www.olympic.ph

in Paris, France 26 July 2024 – 11 August 2024
- Competitors: 22 (7 men and 15 women) in 9 sports
- Flag bearers (opening): Carlo Paalam & Nesthy Petecio
- Flag bearers (closing): Carlos Yulo & Aira Villegas
- Officials: Jonvic Remulla (chef de mission)
- Medals Ranked 37th: Gold 2 Silver 0 Bronze 2 Total 4

Summer Olympics appearances (overview)
- 1924; 1928; 1932; 1936; 1948; 1952; 1956; 1960; 1964; 1968; 1972; 1976; 1980; 1984; 1988; 1992; 1996; 2000; 2004; 2008; 2012; 2016; 2020; 2024

The Philippines competed at the 2024 Summer Olympics in Paris from 26 July to 11 August 2024, celebrating the centenary of the team's debut in the same city. Filipino athletes have appeared in every edition of the Summer Olympic Games from 1924 onwards, except for Moscow 1980 when the nation was part of the American-led boycott.

This is the second consecutive Olympic Games where the Philippines earned at least one gold medal, having won its first-ever gold in Tokyo 2020. Carlos Yulo won two golds in the men's floor and vault events, becoming the first-ever Filipino and Southeast Asian double Olympic gold medalist, and the first from gymnastics. In addition, Aira Villegas and Nesthy Petecio from boxing each won a bronze medal.

The Philippines recorded its best Olympic performance so far, surpassing its performance in 2020, on its 100th anniversary of participation.

== Medalists ==
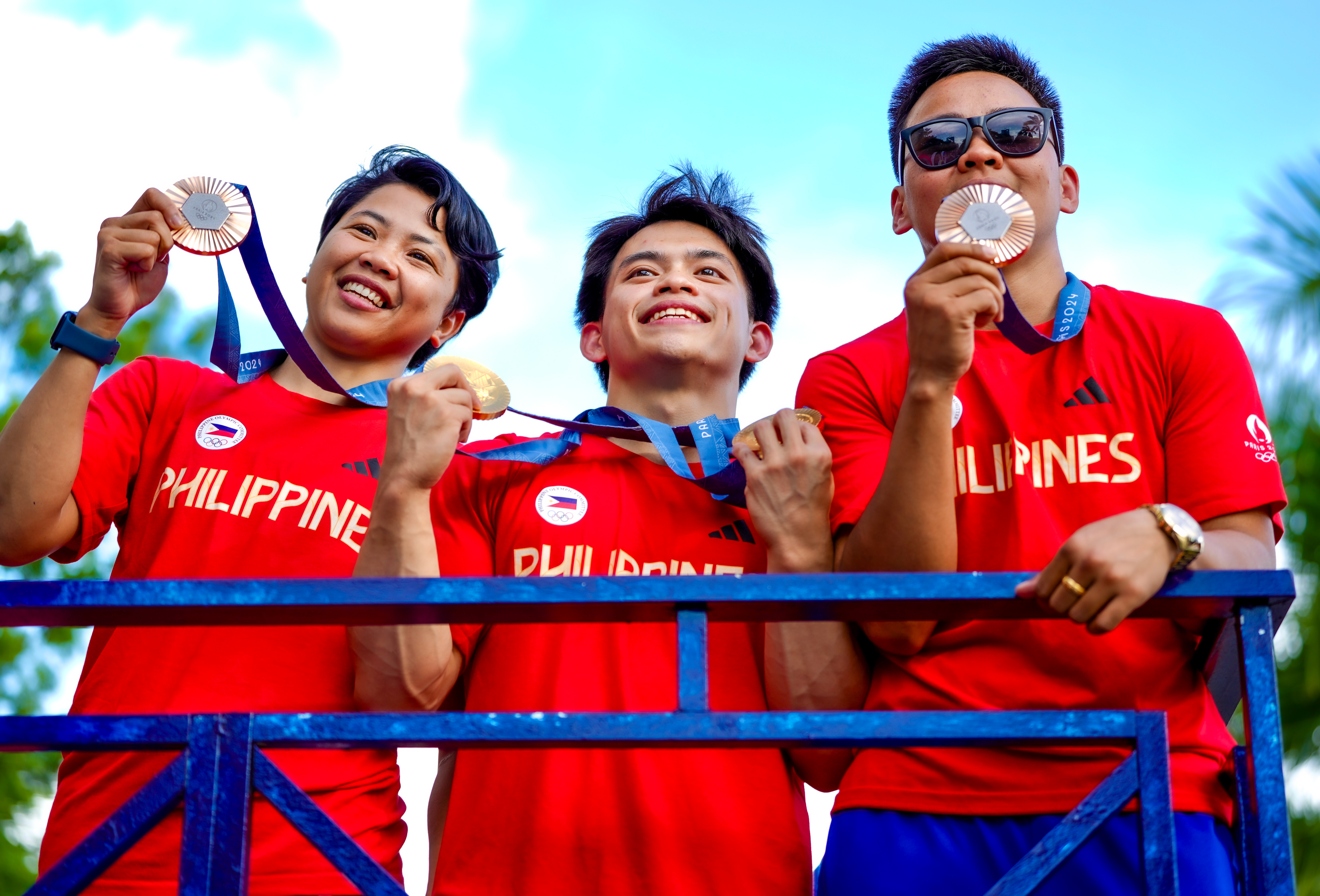
Villegas, Yulo and Petecio with their medals at their welcoming parade in Manila

Medal	Name	Sport	Event	Date
Gold	Carlos Yulo	Gymnastics	Men's floor	3 August
Gold	Carlos Yulo	Gymnastics	Men's vault	4 August
Bronze	Aira Villegas	Boxing	Women's flyweight	6 August
Bronze	Nesthy Petecio	Boxing	Women's featherweight	7 August

== Background ==
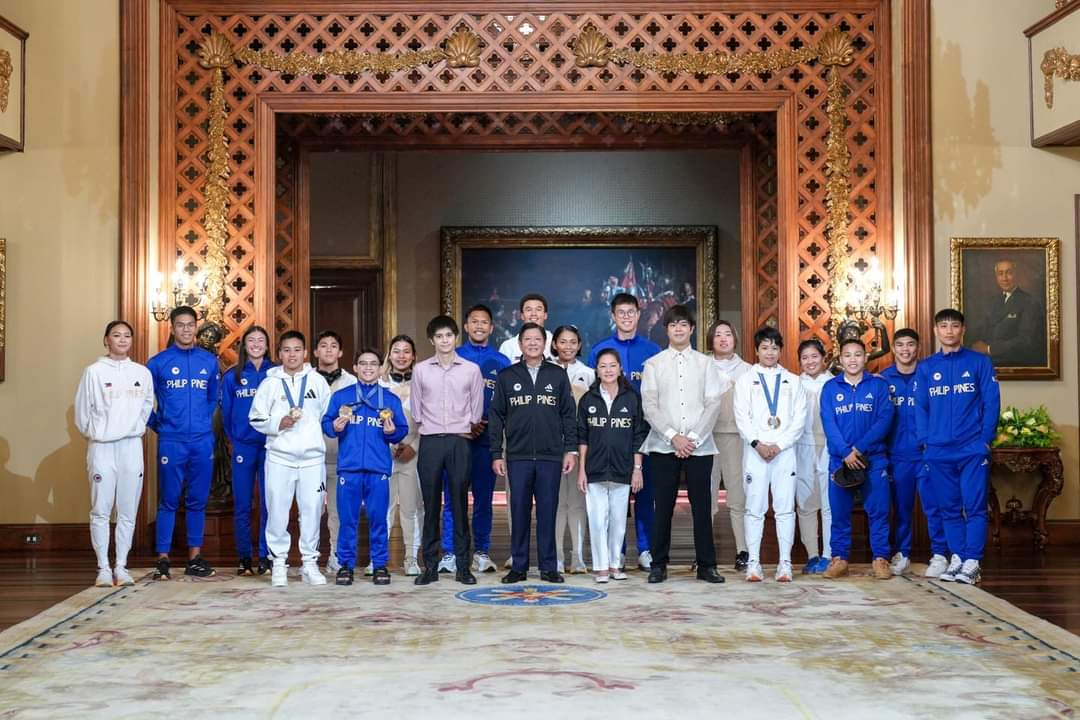
The Philippine delegation with President Bongbong Marcos on August 13, 2024.

=== Administration ===
Samahang Basketbol ng Pilipinas president Al Panlilio was initially appointed as the chef de mission for the Philippine delegation for the 2024 Summer Olympics back in 2022. In February 2023, Panlilio was replaced by Philippine Rowing Association honorary chairman and Cavite governor Jonvic Remulla for the role.

=== Qualification ===
The Philippines aimed to qualify as many as twenty athletes. They hoped to qualify more athletes in basketball, cycling, football, judo, rowing, shooting, swimming, taekwondo, and wrestling. The women's football team advanced to the second round of AFC Women's Olympic Qualifying Tournament, but failed to qualify. The men's basketball team also reached the semi-finals of the FIBA Olympic Qualifying Tournament in Latvia but was not able to secure a spot at the Olympics.

=== Averted WADA sanction ===
In January 2024, the delegation was put at risk of facing a ban on using the Philippine flag at the Games after the World Anti-Doping Agency (WADA) tagged the Philippine Sports Commission for non-compliance with doping regulations. The tagging was disputed and referred to the Court of Arbitration for Sport. The issue was resolved by March 2024, when WADA cleared the Philippines.

=== Preparation ===
The Philippine delegation in late June 2024 started a one-month training camp in Metz in France, as opposed to prior editions where Filipino athletes would come to the host country a just a few days prior to the Games. The training venue was secured in early 2024. Adidas is the official outfitter of the delegation.

Philippine Olympic Committee president Abraham Tolentino projected that the delegation would surpass the performance made back in the 2020 Summer Olympics in Tokyo, where the Philippines won their first ever gold medal.

=== Opening ceremony ===
The Philippine delegation originally proposed weightlifter Hidilyn Diaz as their flagbearer for the opening ceremony in honor of her winning the country's first ever Olympic gold medal in the 2020 Summer Olympics in Tokyo. Since Diaz failed to qualify and the organizers insisted that flagbearers should be competing athletes, boxers Nesthy Petecio and Carlo Paalam were designated for the role instead by virtue of being the country's two silver medalists in the last edition.

The delegation boarded the Parisis, a boat of the Vedettes du Pont Neuf with Poland and Puerto Rico which traveled on a route on the Seine River for the Parade of Nations. The Filipino athletes wore the Sinag Barong, a custom barong by Francis Libiran which features a red and blue sling over the wearer's left upper arm.

=== Broadcasters ===
The Manny V. Pangilinan (MVP) group will provide coverage of the 2024 Summer Olympics in the Philippines. The group has carried broadcast coverage of the Olympics since 2012. Cignal TV is the official media and broadcast partner in the Philippines. Cignal is providing coverage through its numerous free-to-air and paid networks.

Smart Communications is providing coverage of the games through streaming via their own mobile app and social media platforms.

Name	Type	Ref
Cignal TV (through TV5, One Sports, and RPTV)	Free-to-air, Pay and over-the-top	
Smart	Free-to-air	
PLDT	Pay and over-the-top	

== Competitors ==
The following is the list of number of competitors in the Games.

Sport	Men	Women	Total
Athletics	2	1	3
Boxing	2	3	5
Fencing	0	1	1
Golf	0	2	2
Gymnastics	1	3	4
Judo	0	1	1
Rowing	0	1	1
Swimming	1	1	2
Weightlifting	1	2	3
Total	7	15	22

== Athletics ==
Filipino track and field athletes achieved the entry standards for Paris 2024, either by passing the direct qualifying mark (or time for track and road races) or by world ranking, in the following events (a maximum of 3 athletes each): Obiena met the qualifying mark at the BAUHAUS-galan meet of the 2023 Diamond League on 2 July. Meanwhile, hurdlers John Cabang and Lauren Hoffman qualified through world rankings.

Obiena stated before the competition that he was dealing with an unspecified "physical problems" lingering since April, but vowed to compete. In the qualification round, he opened with a 5.40 meter leap. He failed twice in the 5.60 meter leap, before opting to jump 5.70 meter, which he cleared. He then cleared 5.75 meter and finished seventh to qualify for the final. In the final, Obiena placed fourth, finishing with 5.90 meter as his highest successful leap after failing to leap 5.95 meters, behind Emmanouil Karalis of Greece.

Cabang and Hoffman both failed to clinch a spot in the semifinal of their respective events and were relegated to repechage. Hoffman finished seventh in the repechage, while Cabang did not start.

Key

- Note–Ranks given for track events are within the athlete's heat only
- Q = Qualified for the next round
- q = Qualified for the next round as a fastest loser or, in field events, by position without achieving the qualifying target
- NR = National record
- N/A = Round not applicable for the event
- Bye = Athlete not required to compete in round

Track & road events

Athlete	Event	Heat		Repechage		Semifinal		Final	
Athlete	Event	Result	Rank	Result	Rank	Result	Rank	Result	Rank
John Cabang	Men's 110 m hurdles	13.66	6 R	DNS		Did not advance			
Lauren Hoffman	Women's 400 m hurdles	57.83	8 R	58.28	7	Did not advance			

Field events

Athlete	Event	Qualification		Final	
Athlete	Event	Distance	Position	Distance	Position
EJ Obiena	Men's pole vault	5.75	7 Q	5.90	4

== Boxing ==
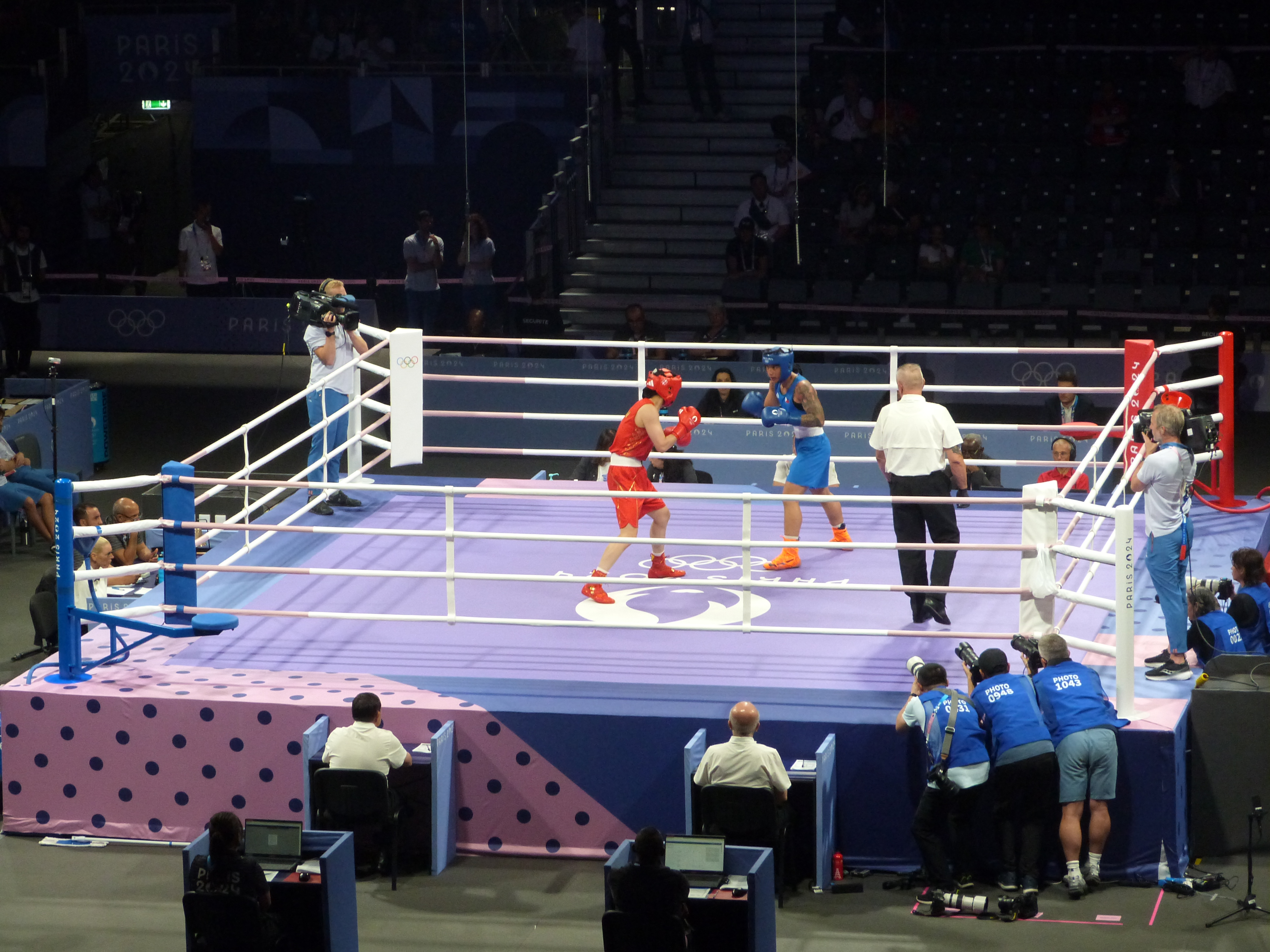
Hergie Bacyadan (in blue) v. Li Qian (in red)

The Philippines entered five boxers (two men and three women) for Paris 2024. Tokyo 2020 medalists Eumir Marcial, Carlo Paalam, and Nesthy Petecio all qualified in men's middleweight, men's featherweight, and women's featherweight events respectively. Marcial secured his spot after reaching the final of men's middleweight event at the 2022 Asian Games in Hangzhou, China. Meanwhile, Petecio qualified for the event after securing a quota spot at the 2024 World Olympic Qualification Tournament 1 in Busto Arsizio, Italy alongside Aira Villegas, who qualified for the flyweight event. Paalam qualified to the event via securing the quota spot at the 2024 World Olympic Qualification Tournament 2 in Bangkok, Thailand, alongside Hergie Bacyadan who qualified for women's middleweight event. A formal appeal to the IOC was made so that retired professional boxer Manny Pacquiao could compete. This was denied with the IOC refusing to waive the age limit for competitors and requirement to participate in the qualifiers.

The draw for the first round was held on 25 July. Petecio and Villegas started their campaigns with a win in the round of 32. The rest of the boxers received a bye to the round of 16.

Marcial was unexpectedly eliminated early on via a loss to Uzbekistan's Turabek Khabibullaev. He attributed the loss on his rib injury two weeks prior in a sparring session. Meanwhile, after winning his opening fight in the round of 16, Paalam was eliminated during the quarterfinals by Australia's Charlie Senior via split decision. Bacyadan lost to the eventual gold medalist Li Qian of China.

Meanwhile, Petecio and Villegas fared better, winning their fights at the round of 16 and quarterfinals to reach the semifinals and guarantee a medal. Both boxers were eliminated in the next round, with Villegas defeated by Turkey's Buse Naz Çakıroğlu via unanimous decision, and Petecio defeated in an upset by Poland's Julia Szeremeta via split decision. Villegas was nursing an injury in her knee, foot and shoulder during her campaign which ended in a bronze.

Athlete	Event	Round of 32	Round of 16	Quarterfinals	Semifinals	Final	
Athlete	Event	Opposition Result	Opposition Result	Opposition Result	Opposition Result	Opposition Result	Rank
Carlo Paalam	Men's 57 kg	Bye	Gallagher (IRL); W 5–0	Senior (AUS); L 2–3	Did not advance		
Eumir Marcial	Men's 80 kg	Bye	Khabibullaev (UZB); L 0–5	Did not advance			
Aira Villegas	Women's 50 kg	Moutaqui (MAR); W 5–0	Boualam (ALG); W 5–0	Lkhadiri (FRA); W 3–2	Çakıroğlu (TUR); L 0–5	Did not advance	3rd place, bronze medalist(s)
Nesthy Petecio	Women's 57 kg	Lamboria (IND); W 5–0	Zidani (FRA); W 4–1	Xu (CHN); W 5–0	Szeremeta (POL); L 1–4	Did not advance	3rd place, bronze medalist(s)
Hergie Bacyadan	Women's 75 kg	—N/a	Li (CHN); L 0–5	Did not advance			

== Fencing ==
Samantha Catantan qualified for the women's individual foil event after winning the 2024 Asia and Oceania Zonal Qualifying Tournament in Dubai, United Arab Emirates, the first for the country since 1992.

Catantan suffered a knee injury during the 2023 SEA Games in Cambodia. Despite this, she won her opening fight against Brazil's Mariana Pistoia in the Round of 64. However, she lost in the next round to London 2012 silver medalist Arianna Errigo of Italy.

Athlete	Event	Round of 64	Round of 32	Round of 16	Quarterfinal	Semifinal	Final / BM	
Athlete	Event	Opposition Score	Opposition Score	Opposition Score	Opposition Score	Opposition Score	Opposition Score	Rank
Samantha Catantan	Women's foil	Pistoia (BRA); W 15–13	Errigo (ITA); L 12–15	Did not advance				32

== Golf ==
Philippines entered two golfers into the Olympic tournament. Bianca Pagdanganan and Dottie Ardina qualified based on their ranking at the Olympic Golf Rankings.

The two golfers had to deal with a lack of official apparel and gear, including having to cover the logos of their golf clubs to comply with Olympics policy on unsanctioned display of branding. Despite this, Pagdanganan and Ardina fared better in the competition. Pagdanganan finished fourth in a four-way tie, the highest ever for a Filipino golfer. Meanwhile, Ardina finished at 13th place in a five-way tie.

Athlete	Event	Round 1	Round 2	Round 3	Round 4	Total		
Athlete	Event	Score	Score	Score	Score	Score	Par	Rank
Bianca Pagdanganan	Women's	72	69	73	68	282	−6	T4
Dottie Ardina	Women's	76	72	69	68	285	−3	T13

== Gymnastics ==
=== Artistic ===
The Philippines qualified four gymnasts. Carlos Yulo earned his berth by being the highest ranked eligible athlete on floor exercise at the 2023 World Artistic Gymnastics Championships; Aleah Finnegan earned her berth by being one of the fourteen highest-ranked eligible athletes in the women's all-around at the 2023 World Artistic Gymnastics Championships; Levi Ruivivar earned a berth via the World Cup series, in which she had the second highest accumulation of points on the uneven bars; and Emma Malabuyo earned a berth after she won the bronze medal in the women's all-around at the 2024 Asian Women's Artistic Gymnastics Championships in Tashkent, Uzbekistan. Finnegan, Malabuyo, and Ruivivar are the first Filipina gymnasts to qualify for the Summer Olympics since 1964.

In the lead-up to the competition, Yulo aimed to qualify for the final of at least two events: all-around and floor exercise. He chose a 6.3 difficulty in his routines, lower than his usual 6.6 to maximize the chance of qualifying for the all-around final. He both qualified for the two events, alongside vault. In the all-around final, Yulo started with a fall during his pommel horse routine, finishing twelfth overall in the all-around. However, he fared better at his other two events. Yulo won the gold medal at the floor exercise final, becoming the first Filipino gymnast to win an event in gymnastics and the second Filipino to win a gold medal in the Olympics, a feat first achieved by Hidilyn Diaz in weightlifting during the previous games. Less than a day later, Yulo went on to win a historic second gold medal during the vault final, becoming the first Filipino in history to achieve multiple gold medals at a single edition of the Olympics.

Finnegan, Malabuyo, and Ruivivar finished at 47th, 41st, and 40th overall during the qualification round.

Men

Athlete	Event	Qualification								Final							
Athlete	Event	Apparatus						Total	Rank	Apparatus						Total	Rank
Athlete	Event	F	PH	R	V	PB	HB	Total	Rank	F	PH	R	V	PB	HB	Total	Rank
Carlos Yulo	All-around	14.766	13.066	13.000	14.800	14.533	13.466	83.631	9 Q	14.333	11.900	13.933	14.766	14.500	13.600	83.032	12
Carlos Yulo	Floor	14.766	—N/a					14.766	2 Q	15.000	—N/a					15.000	1st place, gold medalist(s)
Carlos Yulo	Vault	—N/a			14.683	—N/a		14.683	6 Q	—N/a			15.116	—N/a		15.116	1st place, gold medalist(s)

Women

Athlete	Event	Qualification						Final					
Athlete	Event	Apparatus				Total	Rank	Apparatus				Total	Rank
Athlete	Event	V	UB	BB	F	Total	Rank	V	UB	BB	F	Total	Rank
Aleah Finnegan	All-around	13.733	12.566	11.466	12.733	50.498	47	Did not advance					
Emma Malabuyo	All-around	13.266	12.500	12.233	13.100	51.099	41	Did not advance					
Levi Ruivivar	All-around	13.600	13.200	11.466	12.733	51.099	40	Did not advance					

== Judo ==
Filipino-Japanese judoka Kiyomi Watanabe qualified for the Olympics via the IJF World Ranking List and a continental quota in Asia. This is her second Olympic appearance having debut in the 2020 Summer Olympics in Tokyo in 2021.

Watanabe was eliminated early on during the first round by China's Tang Jing via ippon with kuzure kesa gatame.

Athlete	Event	Round of 32	Round of 16	Quarterfinals	Semifinals	Repechage	Final / BM	
Athlete	Event	Opposition Result	Opposition Result	Opposition Result	Opposition Result	Opposition Result	Opposition Result	Rank
Kiyomi Watanabe	Women's −63 kg	Tang (CHN); L 00–10	Did not advance					17

== Rowing ==
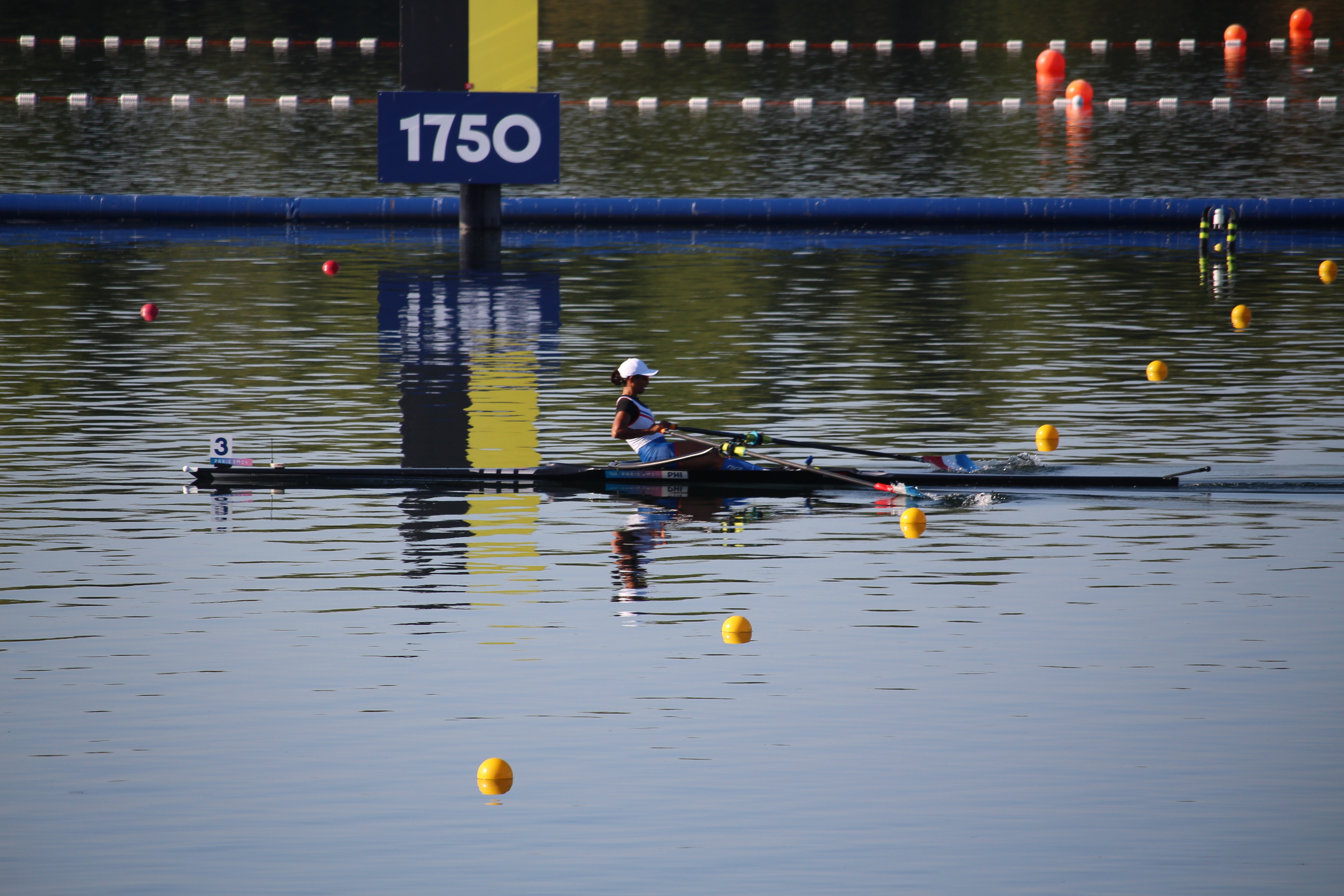
Joanie Delgaco rowing in the repecharge

For the first time, the Philippines qualified a female rower for the single sculls event. Joanie Delgaco secured her spot at Paris during the 2024 Asia & Oceania Qualification Regatta in Chungju, South Korea.

Delgaco placed fourth in the initial heat and was relegated to the repechage. She then finished first, qualifying for the quarterfinals, which she finished last. Delgaco finished her campaign at 20th place during the classification rounds.

Athlete	Event	Heats		Repechage		Quarterfinals		Semifinals		Final	
Athlete	Event	Time	Rank	Time	Rank	Time	Rank	Time	Rank	Time	Rank
Joanie Delgaco	Women's single sculls	7:56.26	4 R	7:55.00	1 QF	7:58.30	6 SCD	8.00.18	5 FD	7:43:53	20

Qualification Legend: FA=Final A (medal); FB=Final B (non-medal); FC=Final C (non-medal); FD=Final D (non-medal); FE=Final E (non-medal); FF=Final F (non-medal); SA/B=Semifinals A/B; SC/D=Semifinals C/D; SE/F=Semifinals E/F; QF=Quarterfinals; R=Repechage

== Swimming ==
The Philippines nominated two swimmers as recipients of universality places from World Aquatics. Kayla Sanchez and Jarod Hatch were the ones who received the nomination. The country requested for Hatch and Sanchez to be given a berth for the men's 100m freestyle and women's 100m backstroke respectively which is subject to approval from World Aquatics. Sanchez previously competed for Canada, winning two medals in the 2020 edition.

In the women's 100 meter freestyle, Sanchez qualified for the semifinals after placing tenth overall in the initial heats, breaking a Philippine national record, which she first set earlier year. She failed to finish among the top eight swimmers in the semifinal, ending her campaign.

Hatch finished last in his heat in the men's 100 meter butterfly. He placed 36th overall, failing to advance to the semifinals.

Athlete	Event	Heat		Semifinal		Final	
Athlete	Event	Time	Rank	Time	Rank	Time	Rank
Jarod Hatch	Men's 100 m butterfly	54.66	36	Did not advance			
Kayla Sanchez	Women's 100 m freestyle	53.67 NR	10 Q	54.21	15	Did not advance	

== Weightlifting ==
The Philippines entered three weightlifters into the Olympic competition. John Ceniza (men's 61 kg), Elreen Ando (women's 59 kg), and Vanessa Sarno (women's 71 kg) secured one of the top ten slots, each in their respective weight divisions based on the IWF Olympic Qualification Rankings (OQR).

Tokyo 2020 gold medalist Hidilyn Diaz notably failed to qualify. Having competed in the now-scrapped women's 55 kg class at the 2020 Summer Olympics in Tokyo, Diaz moved to 59 kg. Ando qualified at her expense, since each country can only qualify one weightlifter per weight division through the OQR.

Ceniza failed to record any lift in the snatch. He made three attempts at 125 kg. He was still recovering from a shoulder injury at the time. Sarno likewise met the same fate, failing to lift 100 kilograms at all three attempts. Sarno linked her performance to the "toxic environment" she endured during her training in Metz, particularly the absence of her preferred coach Richard Agosto, in the lead up to the competition.

Ando struggled during the competition, lifting 100 kilograms during snatch and 130 during clean and jerk, finishing sixth overall. Nevertheless, she still set new personal bests and national records for the clean & jerk and total.

Athlete	Event	Snatch		Clean & Jerk		Total	Rank
Athlete	Event	Result	Rank	Result	Rank	Total	Rank
John Ceniza	Men's −61 kg	~~125~~	DNF	–	–	–	DNF
Elreen Ando	Women's −59 kg	100	8	130 NR	5	230 NR	6
Vanessa Sarno	Women's −71 kg	~~100~~	DNF	–	–	–	DNF

== See also ==
- Philippines at the 2024 Summer Paralympics
