= Maira Moneo =

Uruguayan professional boxer (born 1992)

Personal information
- Nickname: La Panterita
- Born: 25 September 1992 (age 33) Uruguay
- Weight: Lightweight

Boxing career

Boxing record
- Total fights: 19
- Wins: 16
- Win by KO: 3
- Losses: 3

Maira Moneo (born September 25, 1992) is an Uruguayan professional boxer. A lightweight, she has been recognized as the interim champion of the world in her division by the World Boxing Association (WBA) since July 1, 2023, and by the World Boxing Council (WBC) since December 15, 2023, and ranked #3 by the International Boxing Federation (IBF). An aggressive fighter, her nickname is "La Panterita" ("The Small Panther"). A popular performer in Uruguay and in neighboring country Argentina, Moneo has been featured various times at Argentina's international television boxing show, TyC Sports' Boxeo de Primera. Managed by Pedro Bologna and promoted by Georgina Rivero, Moneo was, as of 2024, the WBA's and WBC's interim women's world lightweight champion.

== Professional career ==
Moneo made her professional debut on October 14, 2018, defeating the much more experienced Brazilian fighter Amanda Lopes at the Club Coetc in Montevideo by a four-round unanimous decision.

Moneo won two more fights by decision before rematching Lopes in Moneo's fourth fight. That bout was significant because, in it, Moneo beat Lopes by a sixth-round technical knockout to record her first win as a professional by knockout. This fight took place on June 29, 2019, at the Club Coetc. Lopes retired after that bout, with a record of 1 win and 8 losses.

Moneo's next contest after the Lopes rematch saw her debut at the famous Palacio Peñarol in Montevideo as part of a program promoted by Argentine boxing promoter Sampson Lewkowicz that also marked her first time showcased on TyC Sports' Saturday nights television boxing series, Boxeo de Primera, when Moneo boxed Argentine Estefania Alaniz (4–2–1), defeating her by a six-round unanimous decision despite having one point deducted by referee Alejandro Velazquez Torres in round five.

Moneo's first six professional bouts took place in her native Uruguay, but her seventh fight marked both her first fight abroad and first in Argentina, when she faced Yanina del Carmen Lescano for the vacant South American women's lightweight championship on February 8, 2020, at Club Ferro Carril Concordia in Concordia. Deducted a point in the seventh round for a rabbit punch, Moneo suffered her first loss as a professional boxer when she was disqualified in round ten by referee Rubén Benez, who considered a headbutt that opened a cut over Moneo's right eye to have been caused intentionally by Moneo, leading to him disqualifying Moneo. This fight was a rematch; Moneo had previously beaten Lescano by a four-round unanimous decision on Moneo's second professional fight, on November 10, 2018, at Club Coetc in Montevideo.

Moneo's next bout after the disqualification loss against Lescano was for the vacant WBA Fedelatin lightweight title, against Ana Romina Guichapani (13–1–1), as the main event of a program that also included a fight between Gabriela Celeste Alaniz and Aixa Adema and a Diego Chaves fight. Moneo dropped Guichapani in round nine and forced a stoppage when referee Adrian Maganini decided that Guichapani was not defending herself enough to continue during that same round, thus Moneo scoring her second career knockout victory and first career championship, at the Complejo Multifuncion, in the city of Perez, Santa Fe, in Argentina.

Moneo had a rematch with Estefania Alaniz (5–5–1), with Moneo's WBA Fedelatin lightweight belt on the line, on February 26, 2022, at the Estadio Municipal Hector Gallucci in San Lorenzo, Santa Fe, and she repeated her win over Alaniz by beating her by a wide, unanimous ten-rounds decision with scores of 100–84, 100–89 and 99–88.5 for the Uruguayan (at that time in Argentine boxing, unlike boxing in other countries, judges were allowed to give competitors half a point on rounds) who, with her victory, retained the Fedelatin championship. Of a total of 30 combined rounds scored by the three judges in this contest, Moneo was given 29.

One more successful defense of her title followed (against Sofia Rodriguez, a ten-round unanimous decision win), and then Moneo went for the vacant South American super-lightweight title, facing Yamila Esther Reynoso (12–11–3) at the Club Social Brandsen in Brandsen, Brandsen, Buenos Aires, on October 1, 2022. Moneo took the title by a close but unanimous ten-round decision, with two scores of 96–94 and one of 97–93, all in favor of her.

For Moneo, fight number 13 proved to be her most important contest up until that point in her career, when she fought former WBC world lightweight and super-lightweight champion, the similarly nicknamed ("La Pantera" or "The Panther") Erica Farias (27–7, 10 KOs), in a defense of Moneo's Fedelatin lightweight title, at Casino Buenos Aires at Buenos Aires, Buenos Aires on December 30, 2022. Moneo retained the belt by a very close but unanimous decision in ten rounds with three scores of 96–94 for her.

Moneo became the WBA interim women's world lightweight champion on July 1, 2023, when she beat Alyn Sanchez by an eighth-round technical knockout at the Luna Park Stadium in Buenos Aires, as the main event of a program showcased on TyC Sport. Sanchez was floored in round seven; the fight was stopped on the ringside doctor's advice. With the victory, Moneo was hoping to challenge the WBA's "full" champion, Katie Taylor of Ireland, for full recognition as a WBA world champion.

On December 15, 2023, Moneo fought for, and won, the vacant WBC interim women's world lightweight title by outpointing Bolivia's Lizbeth Crespo by unanimous decision after ten rounds, at the Luna Park Stadium in Buenos Aires, in a contest which was televised across the Americas on TyC Sports' Boxeo de Primera television show.

In July 2024, it was announced Moneo would fight Caroline Dubois for the interim WBC women's lightweight world title at Oakwell Stadium in Barnsley, England, on 3 August that year. She lost by unanimous decision with the ringside judges scoring the fight 100–90, 100–89 and 99–90 in favour of Dubois.

Moneo has a record of 16 wins and 3 losses in 19 professional boxing contests, with 3 wins by knockout.

== Personal life ==
Moneo resides in Montevideo.

== See also ==
- Chris Namús
- List of Uruguayans
