= Boxing at the 2018 Summer Youth Olympics – Girls' lightweight =

Boxing competitions

Girls' lightweight boxing at the III Summer Youth Olympic Games
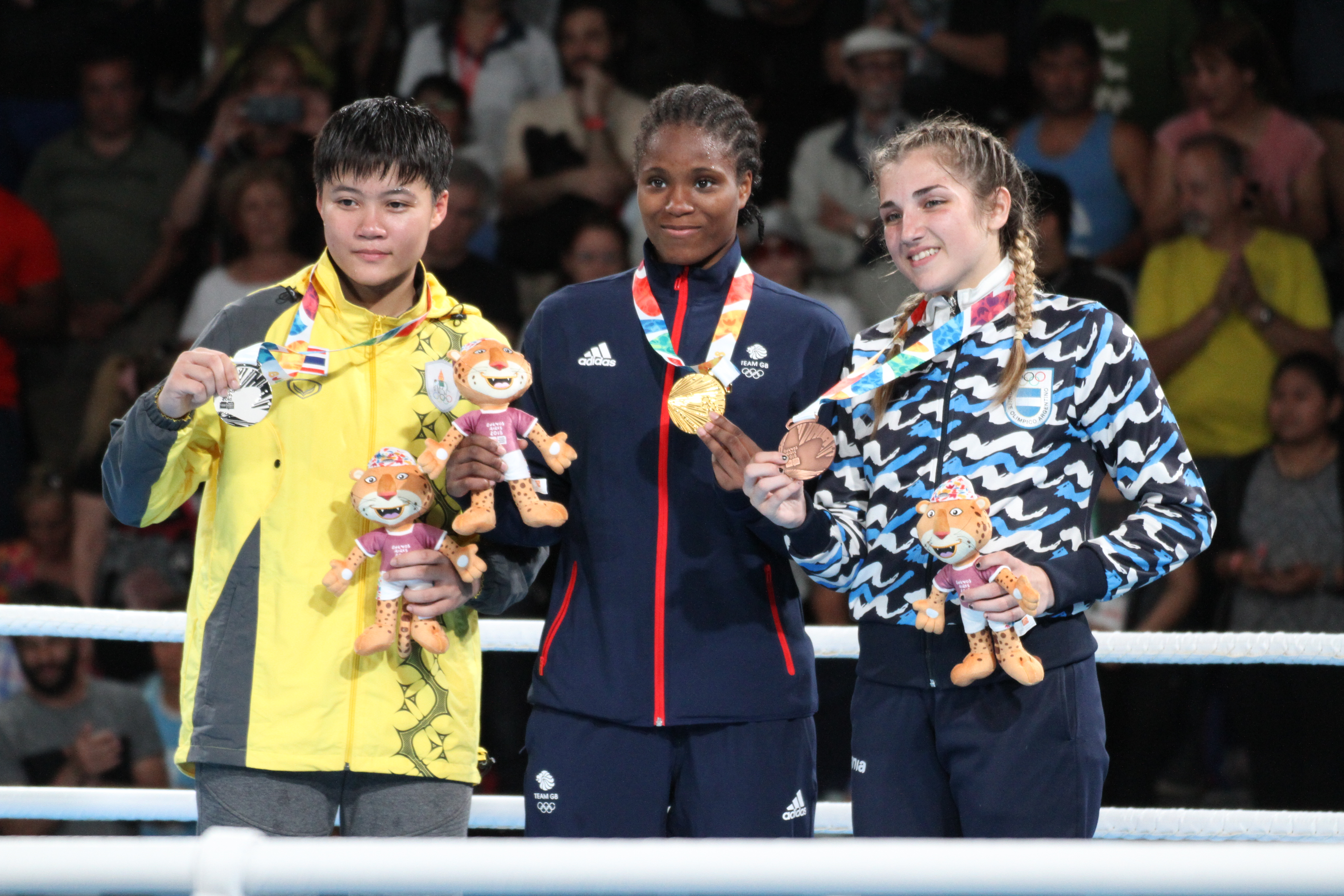
- Victory Ceremony Girls' lightweight Boxing 2018 YOG
- Venue: Oceania Pavilion
- Date: 15–18 October
- Competitors: 7 from 7 nations

Medalists
1st place, gold medalist(s)		Caroline Dubois	Great Britain
2nd place, silver medalist(s)		Porntip Buapa	Thailand
3rd place, bronze medalist(s)		Oriana Saputo	Argentina

The girls' lightweight boxing competition at the 2018 Summer Youth Olympics in Buenos Aires was held from 15 to 18 October at the Oceania Pavilion.

== Schedule ==
All times are local (UTC−3).

Date	Time	Round
Monday, 15 October	15:02	Preliminaries
Tuesday, 16 October	20:33	Semifinals
Thursday, 18 October	16:22	Finals

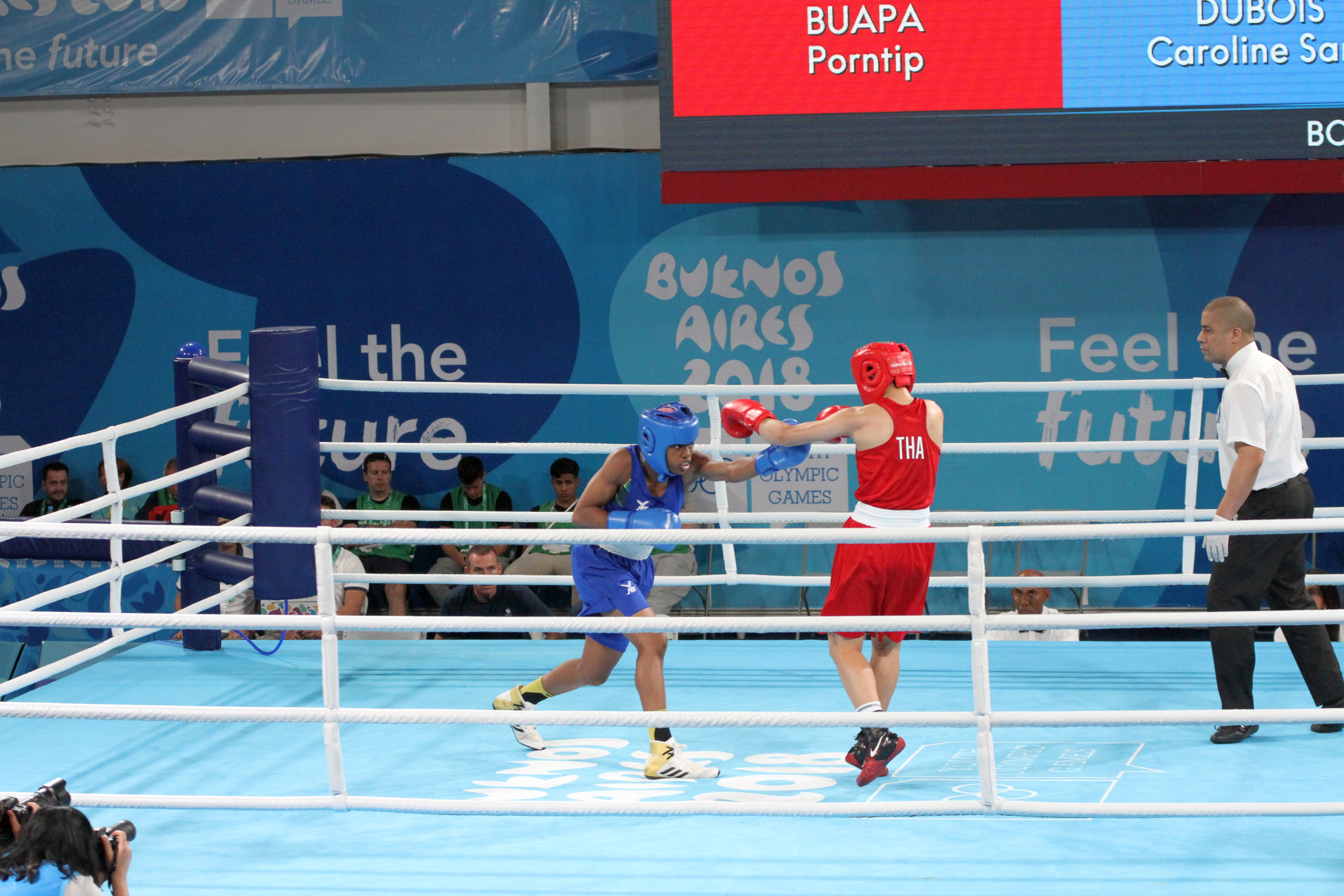
Gold Medal Bout Dubois vs Buapa

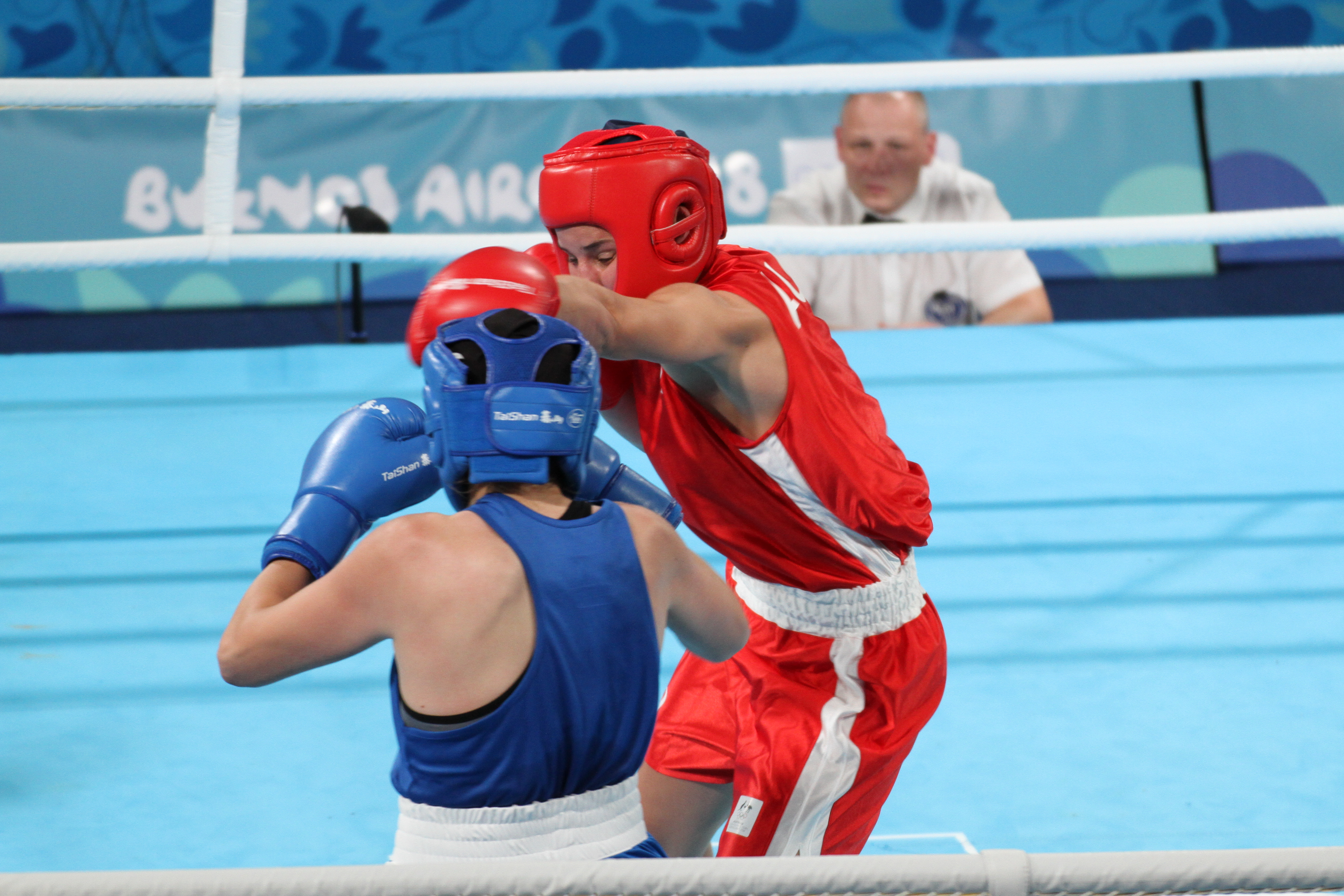
Bronze Medal Bout Saputo vs Lawson

== Results ==
Preliminaries
Emma Lawson (AUS)	5
Fatimo Aramokola (NGR)	0
Oriana Saputo (ARG)	5
Luca Anna Hámori (HUN)	0
Mawada Taghouti (TUN)	0
Caroline Dubois (GBR)	5

Semifinals
Porntip Buapa (THA)	5
Emma Lawson (AUS)	0
Oriana Saputo (ARG)	0
Caroline Dubois (GBR)	5

Final
Porntip Buapa (THA)	0
Caroline Dubois (GBR)	5
Third place
Emma Lawson (AUS)	0
Oriana Saputo (ARG)	5
