= Gabriela Fundora =

American boxer (born 2002)

Personal information
- Nickname: Sweet Poison
- Born: Gabriela Diana Fundora; March 29, 2002 (age 24) Palm Beach, Florida, U.S.
- Height: 5 ft 9 in (175 cm)
- Weight: Flyweight

Boxing career
- Reach: 69 in (175 cm)
- Stance: Southpaw

Boxing record
- Total fights: 20
- Wins: 19
- Win by KO: 10
- No contests: 1
Medal record
Women's amateur boxing
Junior National Championships
Gold medal – first place	2017 Charleston	Bantamweight
National Junior Olympics
Gold medal – first place	2018 Charleston	Bantamweight

Gabriela Diana Fundora (born March 29, 2002) is an American professional boxer and the undisputed flyweight champion, having unified the World Boxing Association (WBA), World Boxing Council (WBC), International Boxing Federation (IBF), and World Boxing Organization (WBO) titles, as well as The Ring magazine title, in November 2024. At 22 years old, she became the youngest undisputed world champion in boxing history, male or female, during the four-belt era.

As of January 2026, Fundora is the #1 ranked female pound-for-pound boxer in the world by BoxRec. She and her brother Sebastian are the first brother-sister duo to become world champions in boxing history.

== Early life and amateur career ==
Fundora was born on March 29, 2002, in Palm Beach, Florida, and is one of six siblings. Her father, Freddy, is Cuban, and her mother, Monique, is Mexican. She began boxing at the age of six. In 2011, Fundora and her family relocated to California's Coachella Valley to access a larger and more competitive boxing talent pool and improved training opportunities, where she began training with her father and brother, Sebastian, at the Coachella Valley Boxing Club.

As an amateur, Fundora was highly decorated and emerged as the nation's top-ranked junior boxer in the 119-pound division. In 2017, she won the Junior National Championships and was named Boxer of the Tournament. That same year, she also captured titles at the Junior Open and the USA Boxing Eastern and Western Olympic Qualifying Tournaments. She continued her success in 2018 by winning the National Junior Olympics and was named USA Boxing Junior Female Boxer of the Year in 2017. Due to age restrictions that made her ineligible to qualify for the next Olympic Games, she subsequently decided to turn professional.

== Professional career ==
=== IBF Flyweight Champion ===
==== Fundora vs. Mucino ====
Fundora turned professional in 2021 and compiled a record of 12-0 with 1 no contest before defeating Arely Muciño, to win the IBF flyweight title on October 21, 2023 in Inglewood, California.

==== Fundora vs. Cruz ====
On January 27, 2024 in Phoenix, Arizona, Fundora defeated Christina Cruz via 10th-round TKO and made the first successful defense of her IBF flyweight title.

==== Fundora vs. Asenjo ====
On August 10, 2024 at Michelob Ultra Arena in Las Vegas, Fundora defeated Daniela Asenjo by unanimous decision and made the second successful defense of her IBF flyweight title.

=== Undisputed Flyweight Champion ===
==== Fundora vs. Alaniz ====
Fundora was scheduled to face Gabriela Celeste Alaniz for the undisputed flyweight title in Las Vegas on November 2, 2024. She won the fight by TKO in the seventh round.

==== Fundora vs. Badillo ====
Fundora was scheduled to make the first defense of her undisputed flyweight title against Marilyn Badillo on April 19, 2025 in Oceanside, CA. Fundora won the fight via stoppage in the seventh round.

==== Fundora vs. Kubicki ====
Fundora was scheduled to make the second defense of her undisputed flyweight title against Ayelen Granadino in Indio, California, on September 20, 2025. On September 11, 2025, it was announced that Alexas Kubicki would replace Granadino. Fundora defeated Kubicki by seventh-round TKO.

==== Fundora vs. Ruiz ====
Fundora made the third defense of her undisputed flyweight title against Viviana Ruiz Corredor at the Honda Center in Anaheim, California, on March 14, 2026. She won by knockout in the sixth round.

==== Fundora vs. Zapotoczna ====
Fundora defended her undisputed title against Jasmina Zapotoczna at Fantasy Springs Resort Casino in Indio, California, on November 20, 2026. She sent her challenger to the canvas with punches to her body in the seventh and eighth rounds, going on to win by unanimous decision.

== Awards ==
- BWAA Female Fighter of the Year: 2024
- The Ring Female Fighter of the Year: 2024
- WBC Female Fighter of the Year: 2025
- WBC Performance of the Year vs. Marilyn Badillo Amaya: 2025
- 2× ESPN Female Fighter of the Year: 2024, 2025
- 2× WBN Female Fighter of the Year: 2024, 2025
- 2× Uncrowned Women's Fighter of the Year: 2024, 2025
- BoxingScene Female Fighter of the Year: 2024
- The Sporting News Women's Fighter of the Year: 2024
- 2× Women Boxing Archive Network (WBAN) Hottest Female Rising Star: 2022, 2024
- WBAN Fighter of the Year: 2025
- Boxing News International Female Fighter of the Year: 2025
- The Sporting News Best Boxer Under 25: 2025

== Professional boxing record ==
20 fights	19 wins	0 losses
By knockout	10	0
By decision	9	0
No contests	1	

No.	Result	Record	Opponent	Type	Round, time	Date	Location	Notes
20	Win	19–0 (1)	Jasmina Zapotoczna	UD	10	Nov 20, 2026	Fantasy Springs Resort Casino, Indio, California,, U.S.	Retained WBA, WBC, IBF, WBO & The Ring flyweight titles
19	Win	18–0 (1)	Viviana Ruiz Corredor	KO	6 (10), 1:25	Mar 14, 2026	Honda Center, Anaheim, California, U.S.	Retained WBA, WBC, IBF, WBO & The Ring flyweight titles
18	Win	17–0 (1)	Alexas Kubicki	TKO	7 (10), 0:43	Sep 20, 2025	Fantasy Springs Resort Casino, Indio, California, U.S.	Retained WBA, WBC, IBF, WBO & The Ring flyweight titles
17	Win	16–0 (1)	Marilyn Badillo Amaya	TKO	7 (10), 1:44	Apr 19, 2025	Frontwave Arena, Oceanside, California, U.S.	Retained WBA, WBC, IBF, WBO & The Ring flyweight titles
16	Win	15–0 (1)	Gabriela Celeste Alaniz	TKO	7 (10), 1:40	Nov 2, 2024	The Theater at Virgin Hotels, Paradise, Nevada, U.S.	Retained IBF flyweight title; Won WBA, WBC, WBO & The Ring flyweight titles
15	Win	14–0 (1)	Daniela Asenjo	UD	10 (10)	Aug 10, 2024	Michelob Ultra Arena, Paradise, Nevada, U.S.	Retained IBF flyweight title
14	Win	13–0 (1)	Christina Cruz	TKO	10 (10), 0:59	Jan 27, 2024	Footprint Center, Phoenix, Arizona, U.S.	Retained IBF flyweight title
13	Win	12–0 (1)	Arely Muciño	KO	5 (10), 1:18	Oct 21, 2023	Kia Forum, Inglewood, California, U.S.	Won IBF flyweight title
12	Win	11–0 (1)	Maria Micheo Santizo	UD	8 (8)	Apr 8, 2023	Dignity Health Sports Park, Carson, California, U.S.	
11	Win	10–0 (1)	Tania Garcia Hernandez	UD	10 (10)	Feb 23, 2023	Sala de Armas, Mexico City, Mexico	Won vacant WBC Youth flyweight title
10	Win	9–0 (1)	Naomi Arellano Reyes	UD	10 (10)	Oct 8, 2022	Dignity Health Sports Park, Carson, California, U.S.	Won vacant WBC Latino flyweight title
9	Win	8–0 (1)	Lucia Hernandez Nunez	UD	8 (8)	Jul 28, 2022	Fantasy Springs Resort Casino, Indio, California, U.S.	
8	Win	7–0 (1)	Rubi Marisol Molina Sanchez	TKO	2 (8)	Apr 29, 2022	Arena Neza, Ciudad Nezahualcóyotl, Mexico	
7	Win	6–0 (1)	Estrella Valverde	TKO	2 (6)	Feb 26, 2022	Domo Deportivo Metropolitano, Ciudad Nezahualcóyotl, Mexico	
6	Win	5–0 (1)	Nataly Delgado	UD	8 (8)	Jan 14, 2022	Centro de Convenciones Vasco Núñez de Balboa, Panama City, Panama	
5	NC	4–0 (1)	Alejandra Soto Martinez	NC	1 (6)	Oct 23, 2021	Salon 3 Coronas, La Paz, Mexico	
4	Win	4–0	Jessica Martinez Castillo	RTD	4 (6)	Sep 25, 2021	Gym Pelon Benitez, San Martín Texmelucan, Mexico	
3	Win	3–0	Karol Mazariegos Gonzalez	TKO	1 (4)	Aug 21, 2021	Big Punch Arena, Tijuana, Mexico	
2	Win	2–0	Indeya Smith	UD	4 (4)	Jul 3, 2021	Dignity Health Sports Park, Carson, California, U.S.	
1	Win	1–0	Jazmin Valverde	UD	4 (4)	May 15, 2021	Dignity Health Sports Park, Carson, California, U.S.	

== Personal life ==
Fundora's brother Sebastian is also a professional boxer. They are both trained by their father, Freddy, at a private gym established by the family.

In 2021, Fundora signed a long-term promotional agreement with Sampson Boxing. In 2024, she entered into a co-promotional deal with Golden Boy Promotions, with Sampson Boxing retained as her co-promoter.

== See also ==
- List of female boxers
- Notable boxing families
- List of southpaw stance boxers
- List of undisputed world boxing champions

Sporting positions
Regional boxing titles
Vacant Title last held by Viviana Ruiz Corredor	WBC Latino flyweight champion October 8, 2022 – October 21, 2023; Won world title	Vacant
Vacant Title last held by Arely Valente	WBC Youth flyweight champion February 23, 2023 – October 21, 2023; Won world title	Vacant Title next held by Alexas Kubicki
World boxing titles
Preceded by Arely Muciño	IBF flyweight champion October 21, 2023 – present	Incumbent
Preceded by Gabriela Celeste Alaniz	WBA flyweight champion November 2, 2024 – present	Incumbent
Preceded by Gabriela Celeste Alaniz	WBC flyweight champion November 2, 2024 – present	Incumbent
Preceded by Gabriela Celeste Alaniz	WBO flyweight champion November 2, 2024 – present	Incumbent
Preceded by Gabriela Celeste Alaniz	The Ring flyweight champion November 2, 2024 – present	Incumbent
Inaugural champion	Undisputed flyweight champion November 2, 2024 – present	Incumbent
