= Nazym Kyzaibay =

Kazakh boxer (born 1993)

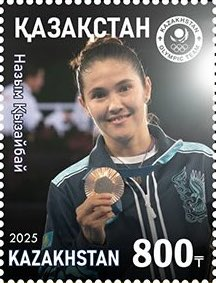
- Kyzaibay at the 2024 Olympic Games as depicted on a 2025 Kazakh stamp

Personal information
- Native name: Назым Абайқызы Қызайбай
- Born: 14 September 1993 (age 33) Jetıgen, Almaty Region, Kazakhstan
- Weight: Light-flyweight; Flyweight; Minimumweight

Sport
- Sport: Boxing
- Coached by: Jumabek Omirzaqov (personal); Vadim Prisyazhnyuk (national)
Medal record
Women's boxing
Representing Kazakhstan
Olympic Games
Bronze medal – third place	2024 Paris	Flyweight
World Championships
Silver medal – second place	2025 Liverpool	48 kg
AIBA World Championships
Gold medal – first place	2014 Jeju	Light-flyweight
Gold medal – first place	2016 Astana	Light-flyweight
Gold medal – first place	2025 Niš	Minimumweight
Bronze medal – third place	2012 Qinhuangdao	Light-flyweight
Asian Championships
Gold medal – first place	2021 Dubai	Flyweight
Bronze medal – third place	2022 Amman	Light-flyweight

Nazym Abaiqyzy Qyzaibai (Kazakh: Назым Абайқызы Қызайбай; born 14 September 1993) is a Kazakh amateur boxer. She is her country's first three-time world champion having won the light-flyweight gold medal in 2014 and 2016 and the minimumweight title in 2025 and also bronze medalist at the 2024 Summer Olympics.

== Career ==
Kyzaibay won the light-flyweight gold medal at the 2014 AIBA Women's World Boxing Championships in Jeju, South Korea, defeating Sarjubala Devi of India in the final.

At the 2016 AIBA Women's World Boxing Championships in Astana, Kazakhstan, she beat China's Wang Yuyan in the light-flyweight final to win the gold medal.

Kyzaibay won the flyweight gold medal at the 2021 Asian Amateur Boxing Championships in Dubai, defeating Mary Kom of India 3:2 in the final.

She won a bronze medal in the flyweight division at the 2024 Paris Olympics, losing to Chinese reigning world champion and eventual gold medalist Wu Yu 4:1 in the semi-finals.

Now competing at minimumweight, Kyzaibay beat Iuliia Chumgalakova from Russia in the final at the 2025 IBA Women's World Boxing Championships in Niš, Serbia, to take the gold medal and become Kazakhstan's first three-time world boxing champion.
