= Amelia Moore =

American amateur boxer (born 1990)

Personal information
- Born: February 4, 1990 (age 36) Middletown, Connecticut, United States
- Height: 5 ft 9 in (175 cm)
- Weight: Lightweight

Boxing career
- Stance: Orthodox

Boxing record
- Total fights: 5
- Wins: 4
- Win by KO: 1
- Losses: 1
Medal record
Women's amateur boxing
Representing the United States of America
Elite National Championships
Silver medal – second place	2016	Kansas City, MO
Gold medal – first place	2017	Salt Lake City
Silver medal – second place	2018	Salt Lake City
Gold medal – first place	2021	Shreveport
National PAL
Gold medal – first place	2017	Salt Lake City
Continental Championships
Bronze medal – third place	2022 Guayaquil

Amelia Moore (born February 4, 1990) is an American professional boxer. She challenged for the WBC and WBO female lightweight titles in 2026. On a regional level, Moore held the NABF female lightweight title in 2026. As an amateur, she won two national championships and competed internationally as a member of USA Boxing.

== Early life ==
Moore was born on 4 February 1990 in Middletown, Connecticut. When she was four, her family moved to Norway, Maine where she attended Guy E. Rowe Elementary School. At age seven, Moore participated in a visiting karate program at the school and began studying competition sparring and kata, which she credits with "igniting a fire" in her for combat sport. Moore played football in middle school and participated in soccer, hockey and track and field at Oxford Hills Comprehensive High School.

Moore became emancipated at age 16 and began working two jobs to support living on her own. By the end of her junior year in high school, her financial situation caused her to consider enlisting in the military rather than attending a four-year college. Her high school counselor encouraged her to look into the United States military academies. After studying information her counselor provided and viewing the 2006 film Annapolis, Moore became especially interested in the United States Naval Academy. The school recruited her to run track.

After her 2008 graduation from high school and a year of Navy preparatory school, Moore entered the United States Naval Academy. She took training classes in swimming, wrestling and boxing and remained at the school for two years before being medically discharged due to a diagnosis of Crohn's disease.

== Amateur career ==
Moore first became interested in boxing in 2006 when she attended a self-defense kickboxing class in Portland, Maine. The instructor, who ran a boxing gym, approached her at the conclusion of the class to ask about Moore's athletic background. Moore was unable to afford the commute to train at the time, but began researching boxing and its training requirements. By the end of junior year, however, she had secured a vehicle and was able to travel to train with Joey Gamache at his gym in Lewiston, Maine.

Unable to receive training at the Naval Academy, Moore found a coach in nearby Millersville, Maryland. When her school obligations were complete, she would run over a mile to her vehicle, which she was not allowed to have as a first-year student, and drive the 20 minutes to train. Moore competed in her first USA Boxing fight on 5 February 2011, the day after her 21st birthday.

In 2015, after completing only 14 official fights, Moore made the 2016 Summer Olympics qualifying tournament but had to withdraw before it began due to illness.

In 2016 at age 27, Moore won the 2017 National Golden Gloves Championship in women's 141-lb weight class. She won gold medals at the Elite National Championships and National PAL that same year, and in 2018 was a top finisher in the European Boxing Confederation's International Boxing Tournament, or "Boxam." Moore won her second national title in December 2021 at the USA Boxing National Championships and won a bronze medal in 2022 the Continental Championships in Guayaquil, Ecuador.

In 2020, she was an alternate for Tokyo Olympics team member Rashida Ellis, but was unable to travel to the Games because of COVID-19 restrictions.

== Professional career ==
Moore made her professional boxing debut on 2 November 2024 at Mohegan Sun Casino in Uncasville, Connecticut, defeating Michaele Nogue over four-rounds by unanimous decision. At the same venue, she knocked out Michelle Cook in the second round of their scheduled four-round contest on 15 April 2025.

In her third pro-fight she secured a unanimous decision win over Victoria Mason in a six-round bout at Foxwoods Resort Casino in Mashantucket, Connecticut, on 11 October 2025.

Moore won the vacant NABF female lightweight title with a unanimous decision success against Bonnie Hunter at North Shore Music Theatre in Beverly, Massachusetts, on 28 March 2026.

She challenged WBC and WBO female lightweight champion Caroline Dubois at The O2 Arena in London, England, on 29 August 2026, losing by unanimous decision.

== Personal life ==
Moore lives in Colorado Springs, Colorado and works as an accountant in healthcare. She enjoys gardening, cooking, paddle boarding, and guitar, and she rides a motorcycle.
