= Caroline Dubois (boxer) =

British boxer (born 2001)

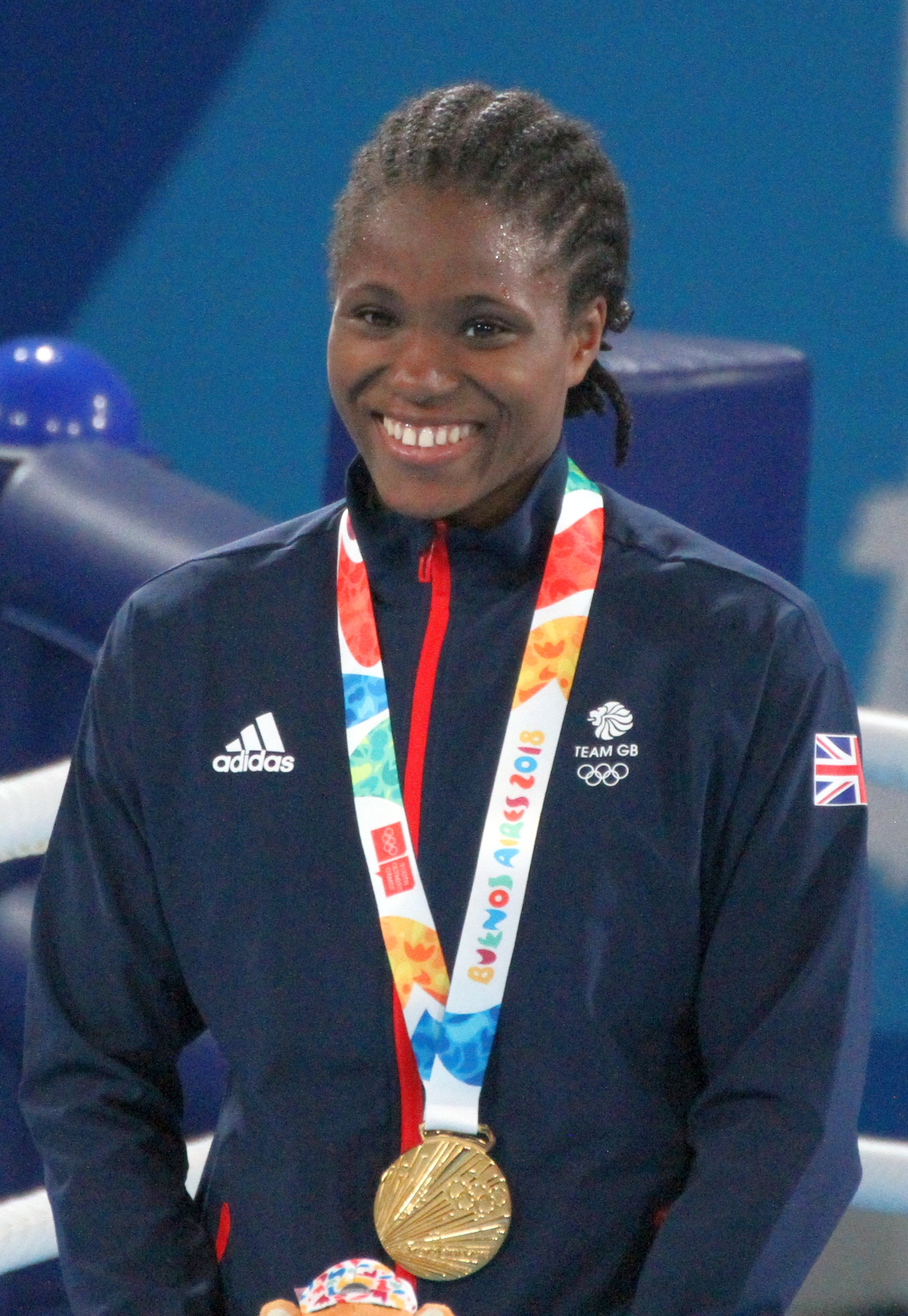
- Dubois at the 2018 Youth Olympics

Personal information
- Nickname: Sweet
- Born: Caroline Sara Dubois; 11 January 2001 (age 25) London, England
- Height: 5 ft 5 1/2 in (166 cm)
- Weight: Lightweight

Boxing career
- Stance: Southpaw

Boxing record
- Total fights: 15
- Wins: 14
- Win by KO: 5
- Losses: 0
- Draws: 1
Medal record
Women's Amateur boxing
Representing Great Britain
Youth Olympics
Gold medal – first place	2018 Buenos Aires	Lightweight

Caroline Sara Dubois (born 11 January 2001) is a British professional boxer. She has held the World Boxing Council (WBC) female lightweight title since December 2024 and the World Boxing Organization (WBO) and Ring magazine female lightweight titles since April 2026. Previously she was the International Boxing Organization (IBO) champion in the same weight division. As an amateur Dubois was Youth Olympic champion, World Youth champion and four-times European Youth champion. She is the younger sister of two-time heavyweight boxing world champion Daniel Dubois.

== Early life ==
Dubois is one of eleven children. She was raised in a single-parent household by her father, a native of Grenada, while her mother is Nigerian.

== Amateur career ==
Dubois started boxing at the age of nine. While there were all-girl amateur boxing clubs in her city, her father wanted her to practice at a top-flight club where her older brother Daniel had trained. For her first few months at Repton Amateur Boxing Club, Dubois pretended to be a boy named Colin.

At the 2017 European Junior Championships, Dubois beat Nune Asatryan by unanimous points decision in the final to take the title. The following year, she had a win at the English National Youth Championships (60 kg), with a unanimous points decision against Ellis Hopkins.

She became England's first World Youth Champion by recording a win over Nune Asatryan by unanimous points decision in August 2018, having previously won in her semi-final by unanimous decision against Rebeca Santos. At the Girls' lightweight competition at the 2018 Summer Youth Olympics Dubois won the gold medal by beating Porntip Buapa in the final.

The 2019 European Youth Championships in 2019 saw Dubois achieve a unanimous points win over Amina Abramova in their semi-final, before winning the title with a split decision against Asatrian in the final. Her next fight was the final of the England Boxing National Youth Championships, which she won by unanimous decision against Wenessa Orczwk. As of February 2020, Dubois was unbeaten, and expressed an ambition to turn professional.

Dubois won the SportsAid One-to-Watch award for 2018, having been chosen from around 1,000 candidates across 60 sports nominated by their sport's governing bodies. She had previously been on the shortlist of ten for the 2017 award. She was also named BBC Young Sports Personality of the Year in 2019.

She qualified for the 2020 Summer Olympics at the 2020 European Boxing Olympic Qualification Tournament, where she took the silver medal after losing to Kellie Harrington on a split decision in the final. At the time of turning pro, Dubois had an amateur record of 37 wins and 3 losses.

== Professional career ==
Dubois made her professional debut at Motorpoint Arena Cardiff in Cardiff, defeating Vaida Masiokaite on points over six rounds.

In her eighth pro-fight, she defeated Magali Rodriguez by unanimous decision to claim the IBO lightweight title at York Hall in London on 30 September 2023.

Dubois made a successful first defense of her title with a unanimous decision win over Miranda Reyes at Wembley Arena in London on 3 February 2024.

In July 2024, it was announced Dubois had signed a long-term promotional deal with Boxxer and would fight Maira Moneo for the interim WBC female lightweight world title at Oakwell Stadium in Barnsley on 3 August that year. She won by unanimous decision with the ringside judges scoring the fight 100–90, 100–89 and 99–90.

On 11 December 2024, Dubois was upgraded to full WBC female lightweight champion after Katie Taylor vacated the title.

Dubois defended her titles against Jessica Camara at Park Community Arena in Sheffield on 11 January 2025. The fight ended in a technical draw at the start of round three on the orders of the ringside doctor after Camara suffered a cut to her left eye caused by an accidental clash of heads.

Having vacated the IBO title, she retained her WBC championship thanks to a majority decision win over Bo Mi Re Shin at the Royal Albert Hall in London on 7 March 2025. Two judges scorecards read 98–92 and 98–93 in her favour, while the third had the fight as a 95–95 draw.

On 9 December 2025, it was announced that Dubois had signed with Most Valuable Promotions and would defend her title against Camilla Panatta at Kaseya Center in Miami, Florida, USA, as part of the undercard of the Jake Paul vs. Anthony Joshua fight on 19 December. She knocked Panatta to the canvas in the sixth round and went on to win the fight by unanimous decision.

Holding the WBC lightweight title, Dubois faced WBO champion Terri Harper in a unification fight at Olympia in London on 5 April 2026. She won by unanimous decision.

On 29 August 2026, Dubois successfully defended her titles with a unanimous decision win over the previously unbeaten Amelia Moore at The O2 Arena in London.

== Achievements ==
- 2016 European junior champion (54 kg)
- 2017 European junior champion (60 kg)
- 2018 English National Youth Champion (60 kg)
- 2018 European junior champion (60 kg)
- 2018 Youth Olympic Games champions (Girls' lightweight)
- 2018 World Women's Youth Champion (60 kg)
- 2019 English National Youth Champion (60 kg)
- 2019 European Women's Youth Champion (60 kg)

== Professional boxing record ==
15 fights	14 wins	0 losses
By knockout	5	0
By decision	9	0
Draws	1	

No.	Result	Record	Opponent	Type	Round, time	Date	Location	Notes
15	Win	14–0–1	Amelia Moore	UD	10	29 Aug 2026	The O2 Arena, London, England	Retained WBC, WBO & The Ring female lightweight titles
14	Win	13–0–1	Terri Harper	UD	10	5 Apr 2026	Olympia, London, England	Retained WBC female lightweight title; Won WBO & vacant The Ring female lightweight titles
13	Win	12–0–1	Camilla Panatta	UD	10	19 Dec 2025	Kaseya Center, Miami, Florida, U.S.	Retained WBC female lightweight title
12	Win	11–0–1	Bo Mi Re Shin	MD	10	7 Mar 2025	Royal Albert Hall, London, England	Retained WBC female lightweight title
11	Draw	10–0–1	Jessica Camara	TD	3 (10)	11 Jan 2025	Park Community Arena, Sheffield, England	Retained WBC and IBO female lightweight title
10	Win	10–0	Maira Moneo	UD	10	3 Aug 2024	Oakwell Stadium, Barnsley, England	Retained IBO female lightweight title; Won Interim WBC female lightweight title
9	Win	9–0	Miranda Reyes	UD	10	3 Feb 2024	Wembley Arena, London, England	Retained IBO female lightweight title
8	Win	8–0	Magali Rodriguez	UD	10	30 Sept 2023	York Hall, London, England	Won vacant IBO female lightweight title
7	Win	7–0	Yanina del Carmen Lescano	UD	8 (8)	16 Jun 2023	York Hall, London, England	
6	Win	6–0	Feriche Mashaury	TKO	3 (8), 0:47	11 Feb 2023	Wembley Arena, London, England	
5	Win	5–0	Sofia Rodriguez	TKO	1 (6), 1:00	17 Dec 2022	Bournemouth International Centre, Bournemouth, England	
4	Win	4–0	Milena Koleva	TKO	5 (6), 1:53	15 Oct 2022	O2 Arena, London, England	
3	Win	3–0	Happy Daudi	TKO	3 (6), 0:36	30 Jul 2022	Bournemouth International Centre, Bournemouth, England	
2	Win	2–0	Martina Horgasz	TKO	1 (6), 0:49	26 Mar 2022	Wembley Arena, London, England	
1	Win	1–0	Vaida Masiokaite	PTS	6	5 Feb 2022	Motorpoint Arena Cardiff, Cardiff, Wales	

== See also ==
- List of female boxers
- Notable boxing families
- List of southpaw stance boxers

Sporting positions
Minor world boxing titles
Vacant Title last held by Estelle Mossely	IBO lightweight champion 30 September 2023 – 2025; Vacated	Vacant Title next held by Pamela Noutcho Sawa
Major world boxing titles
Preceded by Maira Moneo	WBC lightweight champion Interim title 3 August 2024 – 11 December 2024; Promoted	Vacant
Preceded by Katie Taylor; Vacated	WBC lightweight champion 11 December 2024 – present	Incumbent
Preceded by Terri Harper	WBO lightweight champion 5 April 2026 – present	Incumbent
Vacant Title last held by Katie Taylor	The Ring lightweight champion 5 April 2026 – present	Incumbent
