= 2016 AIBA Women's World Boxing Championships – Light flyweight =

Boxing competitions

Light flyweight at the 2016 AIBA Women's World Boxing Championships
- Dates: 21–27 May
- Competitors: 29 from 29 nations

Medalists
gold medal	Nazym Kyzaibay	Kazakhstan
silver medal	Wang Yuyan	China
bronze medal	Marlen Esparza	United States
bronze medal	U Yong-gum	North Korea

The Light Flyweight (45-48 kg) competition at the 2016 AIBA Women's World Boxing Championships was held from 21 to 27 May 2016.

== Draw ==
Round of 32
21 May
(Azerbaijan) Aziza Abbasova	0
(South Korea) Bak Cho-rong	3
21 May
(Japan) Kasumi Saeki	1
(Ukraine) Nataliya Knyaz	2
21 May
(Turkey) Meltem Akar	0
(Mongolia) Lutsaikhany Altantsetseg	3
21 May
(Chinese Taipei) Chin Chian-huei	0
(Italy) Valeria Calabrese	3
21 May
(Russia) Ekaterina Pinigina	0
(China) Wang Yuyan	2
21 May
(Argentina) Jazmin Vilarino	0
(Belarus) Volha Lushchyk	2
21 May
(Philippines) Josie Gabuco	2
(Bulgaria) Sevda Asenova	0
21 May
(Canada) Kim Klavel	3
(Republic of Ireland) Donna Barr	0
21 May
(Germany) Sarah Bormann	3
(New Zealand) Sunita Lallu	0
21 May
(Morocco) Yasmine Mouttaki	0
(North Korea) U Yong-gum	3
21 May
(Kazakhstan) Nazym Kyzaibay	3
(Poland) Angelika Grońska	0
21 May
(Australia) Lauren Camilleri	0
(Sweden) Lise Sandebjer	2
21 May
(Hungary) Virginia Barankai	0
(Sri Lanka) Erandi Kaluhath	3

Round of 16
23 May
(United States) Marlen Esparza	3
(South Korea) Bak Cho-rong	0
23 May
(Ukraine) Nataliya Knyaz	0
(Mongolia) Lutsaikhany Altantsetseg	2
23 May
(Italy) Valeria Calabrese	0
(China) Wang Yuyan	2
23 May
(Belarus) Volha Lushchyk	0
(Philippines) Josie Gabuco	3
23 May
(Romania) Steluţa Duţă	1
(Canada) Kim Klavel	2
23 May
(Germany) Sarah Bormann	0
(North Korea) U Yong-gum	3
23 May
(Kazakhstan) Nazym Kyzaibay	3
(Sweden) Lise Sandebjer	0
23 May
(Sri Lanka) Erandi Kaluhath	0
(India) Sarjubala Shamjetsabam	3

Quarterfinals
24 May
(United States) Marlen Esparza	3
(Mongolia) Lutsaikhany Altantsetseg	0
24 May
(China) Wang Yuyan	3
(Philippines) Josie Gabuco	0
24 May
(Canada) Kim Klavel	0
(North Korea) U Yong-gum	3
24 May
(Kazakhstan) Nazym Kyzaibay	3
(India) Sarjubala Shamjetsabam	0

Semifinals
26 May
(United States) Marlen Esparza	0
(China) Wang Yuyan	3
26 May
(North Korea) U Yong-gum	0
(Kazakhstan) Nazym Kyzaibay	3

Final
27 May
(China) Wang Yuyan	0
(Kazakhstan) Nazym Kyzaibay	3
