= North American Boxing Federation =

Boxing governing body

The North American Boxing Federation (NABF) is a not-for-profit regional sanctioning body that awards regional boxing titles. It is a boxing federation within the World Boxing Council (WBC).

== History ==
The WBC established the NABF in 1969 as part of its creation of a variety of regional boxing federations. These regional federations would sanction championship bouts and crown regional champions. These champions would be given consideration in the world rankings put out by the WBC. The first NABF title bout was between Sonny Liston and Leotis Martin on December 6, 1969.

According to the International Boxing Research Organization, "the appearance of the NABF in 1969 marked the start of major 12-round title bouts in western countries..."

== Current champions ==
=== Male ===
Weight class:	Champion:	Reign began:
Minimumweight	(Mexico) Russell Acosta Silveira	September 12, 2025
Light flyweight	(United States) Terry Washington	February 27, 2026
Flyweight	(United States) Abraham Rene Perez	December 12, 2025
Super flyweight	(Puerto Rico) Juan Carlos Camacho	August 19, 2022
Bantamweight	(United States) Domonique Crowder	October 18, 2025
Super bantamweight	(United States) Jordan Martinez	July 26, 2025
Featherweight	(Mexico) René Palacios	January 30, 2026
Super featherweight	(United States) Iman Lee	April 18, 2026
Lightweight	(Canada) Luis Santana	April 9, 2026
Super lightweight	(Canada) Arthur Biyarslanov	June 6, 2024
Welterweight	(Mexico) Raúl Curiel	June 28, 2025
Super welterweight	(United States) Justin Figueroa	November 7, 2025
Middleweight	(United States) Francis Hogan	November 15, 2025
Super middleweight	(Canada) Wilkens Mathieu	October 30, 2025
Light heavyweight	(Russia) Imam Khataev	January 13, 2024
Cruiserweight	(Nigeria) Efetobor Apochi	March 27, 2026
Heavyweight	(United States) Richard Torrez	April 5, 2025

=== Female ===
Weight class:	Champion:	Reign began:
Atomweight	vacant	
Strawweight	vacant	
Light flyweight	(Canada) Kim Clavel	December 7, 2019
Flyweight	(Canada) Alexas Kubicki	May 4, 2024
Super flyweight	(United States) Shera Mae Patricio	February 28, 2026
Bantamweight	(United States) Reina Tellez	November 9, 2024
Super bantamweight	(United States) Reina Tellez	September 7, 2024
Featherweight	(United States) Hannah Noelle Rapp	March 8, 2025
Super featherweight	(United States) Gabriela Tellez	November 9, 2024
Lightweight	(United States) Amelia Moore	March 28, 2026
Super lightweight	vacant	
Welterweight	vacant	
Super welterweight	(United States) Oshae Jones	November 10, 2023
Middleweight	(United States) Raquel Miller	May 18, 2019
Super middleweight	vacant	
Heavyweight	vacant	

== Other regional WBC federations ==
- Oriental and Pacific Boxing Federation (OPBF)
- European Boxing Union (EBU)
- Asian Boxing Council (ABCO)
- African Boxing Union (ABU)
- Caribbean Boxing Federation (CABOFE)
- Central American Boxing Federation (FECARBOX)
- CIS and Slovenian Boxing Bureau (CISBB)
- South American Boxing Federation (FESUBOX)

== See also ==
- List of boxing organisations
- List of NABF champions
