= 2014 AIBA Women's World Boxing Championships – Light flyweight =

Boxing competitions

The Light flyweight (45–48 kg) competition at the 2014 AIBA Women's World Boxing Championships was held from 16–24 November 2014.

== Medalists ==
Gold	Nazym Kyzaibay (KAZ)
Silver	Sarjubala Devi (IND)
Bronze	Chuthamat Raksat (THA)
Bronze	Madoka Wada (JPN)

== Draw ==
=== Preliminaries ===
	Result	
Judith Mbougnade (Central African Republic)	TKO	(Mongolia) Tumurkhuyag Bolortuul
Sevda Asenova (Bulgaria)	TKO	(Senegal) Camara Raquiatou

=== Top half ===
First Round
(Bolivia) Nadia Barriga	0
(Mongolia) Tömörkhuyagiin Bolortuul	3
(India) Sarjubala Devi	3
(Brazil) Graziele Jesus Sousa	0
(Australia) Lauren Camilleri	0
(United States) Alexandra Love	3
(Czech Republic) Vladimíra Malíková	0
(Indonesia) Aldriani Suguro	3
(Algeria) Souhila Bouchene	WO
(Finland) Sonia Gronroos
(Afghanistan) Shamila Husainzada
(Thailand) Chuthamat Raksat	TKO
(Philippines) Josie Gabuco	0
(Chinese Taipei) Pin Meng-chieh	3
(Italy) Valeria Calabrese	3
(Belarus) Volha Lushchyk	0

Second Round
(Mongolia) Tömörkhuyagiin Bolortuul	0
(India) Sarjubala Devi	3
(United States) Alexandra Love	1
(Indonesia) Aldriani Suguro	2
(Algeria) Souhila Bouchene	0
(Thailand) Chuthamat Raksat	3
(Chinese Taipei) Pin Meng-chieh	2
(Italy) Valeria Calabrese	1

Quarterfinals
(India) Sarjubala Devi	3
(Indonesia) Aldriani Suguro	0
(Thailand) Chuthamat Raksat	2
(Chinese Taipei) Pin Meng-chieh	1

Semifinals
(India) Sarjubala Devi	2
(Thailand) Chuthamat Raksat	0

=== Bottom half ===
First Round
(Turkey) Ayşe Çağırır	2
(Sri Lanka) Anusha Koddithuwakku	1
(Russia) Zoia Isaeva	TKO
(Azerbaijan) Aziza Abbasova
(Germany) Annemarie Stark	0
(Japan) Madoka Wada	3
(Netherlands) Abbygail Deekman	0
(Ukraine) Nataliya Knyaz	3
(South Korea) Bak Cho-rong	3
(Hungary) Virginia Barankai	0
(Uganda) Moreen Ajambo
(Kazakhstan) Nazym Kyzaibay	TKO
(Sweden) Elin Ronnlund	0
(Romania) Steluţa Duţă	3
(Bulgaria) Sevda Asenova	1
(China) Xu Shiqi	2

Second Round
(Turkey) Ayşe Çağırır	0
(Russia) Zoia Isaeva	3
(Japan) Madoka Wada	2
(Ukraine) Nataliya Knyaz	0
(South Korea) Bak Cho-rong	0
(Kazakhstan) Nazym Kyzaibay	3
(Romania) Steluţa Duţă	2
(China) Xu Shiqi	0

Quarterfinals
(Russia) Zoia Isaeva	0
(Japan) Madoka Wada	3
(Kazakhstan) Nazym Kyzaibay	3
(Romania) Steluţa Duţă	0

Semifinals
(Japan) Madoka Wada	0
(Kazakhstan) Nazym Kyzaibay	2

=== Final ===
Final
(India) Sarjubala Devi	0
(Kazakhstan) Nazym Kyzaibay	3
