= Silvana Carsetti =

Argentine boxing commentator

- Born: Silvana Eleonora Carsetti; June 2, 1980 (age 45); Argentina
- Occupations: Television reporter, sports commentator
- Known for: Boxing coverage on TyC Sports and Fox Deportes

Silvana Eleonora Carsetti (born June 2, 1980) is an Argentine television boxing reporter and commentator. She works in Argentina, on a show named Boxeo de Primera, transmitted every Saturday evening to her country and to most countries in the Americas on TyC Sports. She has also done some work for Argentine television show Golpe a Golpe presented by Walter Nelson. She also periodically works in the United States, on Fox Deportes.

== Biography ==
Silvana Carsetti graduated from university with a degree in sports journalism. She admits she did not know anything about boxing when she started studying to become a sportscaster. She preferred basketball, association football, car racing, swimming and volleyball instead.

== Personal ==
She is the former girlfriend of Sergio Martinez. They met in 2009 and dated for 13 months.

== Martinez controversy ==
Sergio Martinez allegedly asked TyC Sports not to send Carsetti to Las Vegas, Nevada, to cover his match with Julio César Chávez Jr.; Around this time, Carsetti told an interviewer that Martinez had allegedly hit her during their relationship; Martinez manager Sampson Lewkowicz declared it was him and not Martinez who had ordered the television station not to send Carsetti to cover the fight, and Carsetti then tweeted that Martinez had never hit her.

== Work ==
Silvana Carsetti has done television work, both for TyC Sports and for Fox Deportes en Espanol, around the world, including Bangkok, Thailand, Cancun, Mexico and the United States.

She has interviewed several famous boxers, including Jackie Nava, Omar Narvaez, Nonito Donaire and Lucas Matthysse.
