= 2025 IBA Women's World Boxing Championships – Minimumweight =

Minimumweight at the 2025 IBA Women's World Boxing Championships
- Venue: Sportski centar Čair
- Location: Niš, Serbia
- Dates: 10–14 March (preliminaries/semifinals); 16 March (final)
- Competitors: 21 from 21 nations

Medalists
gold medal	Nazym Kyzaibay	Kazakhstan
silver medal	Iuliia Chumgalakova	Russia
bronze medal	Farzona Fozilova	Uzbekistan
bronze medal	Hong Kyong-ryong	North Korea

The Minimumweight competition at the 2025 IBA Women's World Boxing Championships was held from 10 to 16 March 2025.

== Results ==
=== Finals ===
Semi-finals
(Uzbekistan) Farzona Fozilova	0
(Russia) Iuliia Chumgalakova	5
(Kazakhstan) Nazym Kyzaibay	4
(North Korea) Hong Kyong-ryong	1

Final
(Russia) Iuliia Chumgalakova	0
(Kazakhstan) Nazym Kyzaibay	5

=== Top half ===
==== Section 1 ====
Round of 32
(China) Zhong Xueyun	5
(Spain) Marta López	2

Round of 16
(Uzbekistan) Farzona Fozilova	5
(China) Zhong Xueyun	0
(Azerbaijan) Anakhanim Ismayilova	w/o
(South Africa) Phiwokuhle Mnguni

Quarterfinals
(Uzbekistan) Farzona Fozilova	5
(Azerbaijan) Anakhanim Ismayilova	0

==== Section 2 ====
Round of 32
(North Macedonia) Suada Ibraimovska
(Russia) Iuliia Chumgalakova	RSC
(Greece) Athina Avramidou
(Mexico) Ingrid Gómez	RSC

Round of 16
(Vietnam) Ngô Ngọc Linh Chi	0
(Russia) Iuliia Chumgalakova	5
(Mexico) Ingrid Gómez	3
(Morocco) Rabab Cheddar	4

Quarterfinals
(Russia) Iuliia Chumgalakova	5
(Morocco) Rabab Cheddar	0

=== Bottom half ===
==== Section 3 ====
Round of 32
(Republic of Ireland) Carleigh Irving	0
(Venezuela) Tayonis Cedeño	5

Round of 16
(Serbia) Snežana Šiljković	0
(Venezuela) Tayonis Cedeño	5
(Slovakia) Nicole Ďuríková
(Kazakhstan) Nazym Kyzaibay	RSC

Quarterfinals
(Venezuela) Tayonis Cedeño
(Kazakhstan) Nazym Kyzaibay	RSC

==== Section 4 ====
Round of 32
(Turkey) Nurselen Yalgettekin	RSC
(Afghanistan) Tamana Ahmadi

Round of 16
(Romania) Ramona Manea
(North Korea) Hong Kyong-ryong	RSC
(Turkey) Nurselen Yalgettekin	0
(Bulgaria) Sevda Asenova	5

Quarterfinals
(North Korea) Hong Kyong-ryong	5
(Bulgaria) Sevda Asenova	0
