= Boxing at the 2024 Summer Olympics – Women's 50 kg =

Women's 50 kg at the Games of the XXXIII Olympiad
- Boxing pictogram
- Venue: Arena Paris Nord (preliminary); Stade Roland Garros (semifinals and finals)
- Dates: 28 July – 9 August 2024
- Competitors: 22 from 22 nations

Medalists
1st place, gold medalist(s)		Wu Yu	China
2nd place, silver medalist(s)		Buse Naz Çakıroğlu	Turkey
3rd place, bronze medalist(s)		Nazym Kyzaibay	Kazakhstan
3rd place, bronze medalist(s)		Aira Villegas	Philippines

The women's 50 kg (flyweight) boxing event at the 2024 Summer Olympics took place between 28 July and 9 August 2024. Preliminary boxing matches occurred at Arena Paris Nord in Villepinte, with the medal rounds (semifinals and finals) staged at Stade Roland Garros.

== Qualification ==
Each NOC could send one boxer to the event.

== Competition format ==
Like all Olympic boxing events, the competition was a straight single-elimination tournament. The competition began with a preliminary round, where the number of competitors was reduced to 16, and concluded with a final. As there were fewer than 32 boxers in the competition, a number of boxers received a bye through the preliminary round. Both semi-final losers were awarded bronze medals.

Bouts consisted of three three-minute rounds with a one-minute break between rounds. A boxer may win by knockout or by points. Scoring was on the "10-point-must," with five judges scoring each round. Judges consider "number of blows landed on the target areas, domination of the bout, technique and tactical superiority and competitiveness." Each judge determined a winner for each round, who received 10 points for the round, and assigned the round's loser a number of points between seven and nine based on performance. The judge's scores for each round were added to give a total score for that judge. The boxer with the higher score from a majority of the judges was the winner.

== Schedule ==
The schedule was as follows.

Legend

R32	Round of 32	R16	Round of 16	QF	Quarter-Finals	SF	Semi-Finals	F	Final

Jul 28	Jul 29	Jul 30	Jul 31	Aug 1	Aug 2	Aug 3	Aug 4	Aug 5	Aug 6	Aug 7	Aug 8	Aug 9
R32				R16		QF			SF			F

== Draw ==
The draw was held on 25 July 2024.

== Seeds ==
The seeds were released on 25 July 2024.

1. Wu Yu (CHN) (champion)
2. Roumaysa Boualam (ALG) (round of 16)
3. Buse Naz Çakıroğlu (TUR) (final)
4. Caroline de Almeida (BRA) (round of 16)
5. Monique Suraci (AUS) (round of 16)
6. Jennifer Lozano (USA) (round of 16)
7. Wassila Lkhadiri (FRA) (quarterfinals)
8. Chuthamat Raksat (THA) (quarterfinals)

== Results ==
=== Finals ===
Final
9 August
Wu Yu (CHN)	4
Buse Naz Çakıroğlu (TUR)	1

=== Top half ===
Round of 32
28 July
Maxi Klötzer (GER)	0
Nikhat Zareen (IND)	5
28 July
Oyuntsetsegiin Yesügen (MGL)	0
Ingrit Valencia (COL)	5
28 July
Giordana Sorrentino (ITA)	1
Nazym Kyzaibay (KAZ)	4

Round of 16
1 August
Wu Yu (CHN)	5
Nikhat Zareen (IND)	0
1 August
Sabina Bobokulova (UZB)	0
Chuthamat Raksat (THA)	5
1 August
Monique Suraci (AUS)	0
Ingrit Valencia (COL)	5
1 August
Nazym Kyzaibay (KAZ)	5
Caroline de Almeida (BRA)	0

Quarterfinals
3 August
Wu Yu (CHN)	5
Chuthamat Raksat (THA)	0
3 August
Ingrit Valencia (COL)	1
Nazym Kyzaibay (KAZ)	4

Semifinals
6 August
Wu Yu (CHN)	4
Nazym Kyzaibay (KAZ)	1

=== Bottom half ===
Round of 32
28 July
Fátima Herrera (MEX)	3
Laura Fuertes (ESP)	2
28 July
Pihla Kaivo-oja (FIN)	5
Margret Tembo (ZAM)	0
28 July
Yasmine Moutaqui (MAR)	0
Aira Villegas (PHI)	5

Round of 16
1 August
Buse Naz Çakıroğlu (TUR)	5
Fátima Herrera (MEX)	0
1 August
Pihla Kaivo-oja (FIN)	5
Jennifer Lozano (USA)	0
1 August
Wassila Lkhadiri (FRA)	4
Daina Moorehouse (IRL)	1
1 August
Aira Villegas (PHI)	5
Roumaysa Boualam (ALG)	0

Quarterfinals
3 August
Buse Naz Çakıroğlu (TUR)	5
Pihla Kaivo-oja (FIN)	0
3 August
Wassila Lkhadiri (FRA)	2
Aira Villegas (PHI)	3

Semifinals
6 August
Buse Naz Çakıroğlu (TUR)	5
Aira Villegas (PHI)	0
