= Marlen Esparza =

American boxer (born 1989)

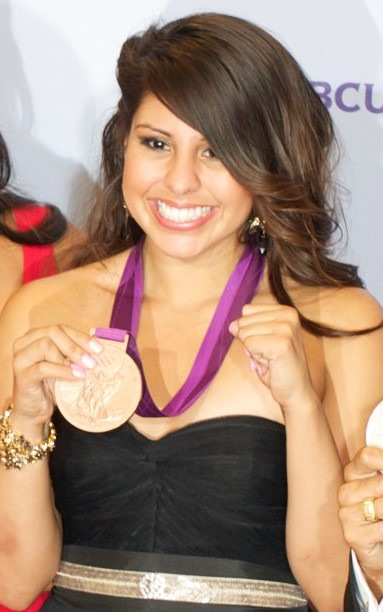
- Esparza at the 2012 ALMA Awards

Personal information
- Born: July 29, 1989 (age 36) Pasadena, Texas, U.S.
- Height: 5 ft 3 in (160 cm)
- Weight: Flyweight

Boxing career
- Reach: 64 in (163 cm)
- Stance: Orthodox

Boxing record
- Total fights: 18
- Wins: 15
- Win by KO: 1
- Losses: 3
Medal record
Women's amateur boxing
Representing the United States
Olympic Games
Bronze medal – third place	2012 London	Flyweight
World Championships
Gold medal – first place	2014 Jeju	Flyweight
Bronze medal – third place	2006 New Delhi	Light flyweight
Bronze medal – third place	2016 Astana	Light flyweight

Marlen Esparza (born July 29, 1989) is an American professional boxer who is the former WBC, WBO, WBA and Ring female world flyweight champion. As an amateur, in 2012 she became the first American female boxer to qualify for the Olympics, in the first year that women's boxing was an Olympic event, going on to win a bronze medal in the women's flyweight division at the London Olympics. This made her the first American woman winner of any Olympic boxing medal.

== Amateur career ==
Esparza won a bronze medal at the 2006 Women's World Boxing Championship, gold at the 2014 AIBA Women's World Boxing Championships, and bronze at the 2016 AIBA Women's World Boxing Championships.

In 2012 she became the first American woman to qualify for the Olympics in women's boxing, in the first year that women's boxing was an Olympic event. At the 2012 Summer Olympics she defeated Karlha Magliocco, making her the first American woman winner of an Olympic boxing match. She won a bronze medal in the women's flyweight division, making her the first American woman winner of any Olympic boxing medal.

Esparza was voted the Houston Fighter Of The Year (an award that encompasses both professional and amateur boxers) for 2010, 2011, 2012, 2013, and 2014. She also won the inaugural Houston Female Fighter of the Year in 2022.

== Professional career ==
In December 2016, she signed a contract with Golden Boy Promotions and subsequently made her pro debut on ESPN's March 23, 2017 opening card of a multi-year deal with Golden Boy. She won that fight, which was against Rachel Sazoff.

She faced Seniesa Estrada for the WBA interim female flyweight title on November 2, 2019 at the MGM Grand Garden Arena in Paradise, Nevada. The bout formed part of the undercard for Canelo Álvarez vs. Sergey Kovalev. The bout was stopped at the end of the ninth round, on the advice of the ringside doctor, after Esparza suffered a cut in the fifth round from an accidental clash of heads, handing her the first defeat of her professional career by way of a unanimous technical decision.

Esparza won her first professional world title by defeating WBC flyweight champion Ibeth Zamora Silva via unanimous decision at Don Haskins Center, El Paso, Texas, on June 19, 2021.

She became a unified world champion when she scored a unanimous decision win over WBA title holder Naoko Fujioka at the Alamodome, San Antonio, Texas, on April 9, 2022, in a contest which was also for the inaugural Ring female world flyweight championship.

On July 8, 2023, at the AT&T Center in San Antonio, Texas, Esparza defeated Gabriela Celeste Alaniz by majority decision to add the WBO female flyweight title to her collection.

Esparza was scheduled to defend her WBA, WBC, WBO flyweight titles in a rematch against Alaniz on March 16, 2024, in Las Vegas but the fight was postponed due to challenger's US VISA issue. The fight eventually took place on April 27, 2024, at Save Mart Arena, Fresno, California, although Esparza missed weight by 2 lbs, and was ineligible to keep the titles in case of her victory. Alaniz won the contest by split decision.

== Personal life ==
Esparza, who is of Mexican descent, graduated from Pasadena High School in Pasadena, Texas in 2007. She was the subject of Soledad O'Brien's 2011 CNN documentary In Her Corner: Latino in America 2.

She had an endorsement deal with CoverGirl cosmetics and appeared in a Spanish-language commercial for Coca-Cola. Esparza also appeared in an advert for animal rights group PETA.

== Professional boxing record ==
18 fights	15 wins	3 losses
By knockout	1	0
By decision	14	3

No.	Result	Record	Opponent	Type	Round, time	Date	Location	Notes
18	Loss	15–3	Yokasta Valle	SD	10	March 29, 2025	Cancun, Quintana Roo, Mexico	
17	Win	15–2	Arely Muciño	UD	10	December 24, 2024	Toyota Arena, Ontario, California, U.S.	
16	Loss	14–2	Gabriela Celeste Alaniz	SD	10	April 27, 2024	Save Mart Arena, Fresno, California, U.S.	Lost WBC, WBA, WBO and The Ring female flyweight titles - Esparza missed weight.
15	Win	14–1	Gabriela Celeste Alaniz	MD	10	July 8, 2023	AT&T Center, San Antonio, Texas, U.S.	Retained WBC, WBA and The Ring female flyweight titles, won WBO female Flyweight title
14	Win	13–1	Eva Guzman	UD	10	August 6, 2022	Dickies Arena, Fort Worth, Texas, U.S.	Retained WBC, WBA and The Ring female flyweight titles
13	Win	12–1	Naoko Fujioka	UD	10	April 9, 2022	Alamodome, San Antonio, Texas, U.S.	Retained WBC female flyweight title; Won WBA and inaugural The Ring female flyweight titles
12	Win	11–1	Anabel Ortiz	UD	10	December 18, 2021	AT&T Center, San Antonio, Texas, U.S.	Retained WBC female flyweight title
11	Win	10–1	Ibeth Zamora Silva	UD	10	June 19, 2021	Don Haskins Center, El Paso, Texas, U.S.	Won WBC female flyweight title
10	Win	9–1	Shelly Barnett	UD	6	March 5, 2021	Dort Federal Event Center, Flint, Michigan, U.S.	
9	Win	8–1	Sulem Urbina	UD	8	October 30, 2020	Fantasy Springs Resort Casino, Indio, California, U.S.	
8	Loss	7–1	Seniesa Estrada	TD	9 (10), 2:00	Nov 2, 2019	MGM Grand Garden Arena, Paradise, Nevada, U.S.	For WBA interim female flyweight title; Unanimous TD after Esparza was cut from an accidental head clash
7	Win	7–0	Sonia Osorio	UD	8	July 18, 2019	Fantasy Springs Resort Casino, Indio, California, U.S.	
6	Win	6–0	Jhosep Vizcaíno	UD	8	April 25, 2019	Fantasy Springs Resort Casino, Indio, California, U.S.	
5	Win	5–0	Laetizia Campana	TKO	3 (8), 0:11	April 6, 2018	Belasco Theater, Los Angeles, California, U.S.	
4	Win	4–0	Karla Valenzuela	UD	6	December 14, 2017	Fantasy Springs Resort Casino, Indio, California, U.S.	
3	Win	3–0	Aracely Palacios	UD	6	September 16, 2017	T-Mobile Arena, Paradise, Nevada, U.S.	
2	Win	2–0	Samantha Salazar	UD	4	May 6, 2017	T-Mobile Arena, Paradise, Nevada, U.S.	
1	Win	1–0	Rachel Sazoff	UD	4	March 23, 2017	Fantasy Springs Resort Casino, Indio, California, U.S.	

Sporting positions
World boxing titles
Preceded by Ibeth Zamora Silva	WBC female Flyweight champion June 19, 2021 – April 27, 2024	Succeeded by Gabriela Celeste Alaniz
Preceded by Naoko Fujioka	WBA female Flyweight champion April 9, 2022 – April 27, 2024	Succeeded by Gabriela Celeste Alaniz
Inaugural champion	The Ring female Flyweight champion April 9, 2022 – April 27, 2024	Succeeded by Gabriela Celeste Alaniz
Preceded by Gabriela Celeste Alaniz	WBO female Flyweight champion July 8, 2023 – April 27, 2024	Succeeded by Gabriela Celeste Alaniz
