= Débora Anahí López =

Argentine boxer (born 1995)

Personal information
- Nickname: La Indiecita
- Born: 20 February 1995 (age 31) Junín, Buenos Aires, Argentina
- Weight: Flyweight; Super-flyweight; Bantamweight

Boxing career
- Stance: Orthodox

Boxing record
- Total fights: 24
- Wins: 21
- Win by KO: 1
- Losses: 3
- Draws: 1

Débora Anahí López (born 20 February 1995) is an Argentine professional boxer who held the WBO female flyweight title from 2019 to 2022.

== Professional career ==
López made her professional debut on 18 September 2015, scoring a four-round unanimous decision (UD) victory against Yisele Sosa (5–6, 3 KOs) at Club General San Martín in Junín, Argentina.

After compiling a record of 15–0–1 (1 KO), winning the Argentine female flyweight title twice and the South American female flyweight title once, she faced Niorkis Carreno for the vacant WBO female flyweight title on 20 December 2019 at Social y Deportivo Camioneros in Luis Guillon, Argentina. López defeated Carreno via UD to capture her first world title. Two judges scored the bout 100–89 and the third scored it 98–91.

On 19 March 2022, she lost for the WBO's vacant female flyweight world title against countrywoman Tamara Elisabet DeMarco, who was 9–4, 0 knockouts in thirteen previous contests coming in, by a ninth-round technical decision when Lopez suffered a severe cut after an accidental headbutt and was deemed unfit to continue. She was behind on two of the three judges' scorecards, so she lost by a split technical decision.

López challenged WBO female bantamweight champion, Dina Thorslund, at Gråkjær Arena, Holstebro, Denmark, on 25 February 2023. She lost by technical knockout in the eighth round.

She fought Angelina Lukas for the vacant IBO female super-flyweight title in Bangkok, Thailand, on 6 October 2024, but lost by unanimous decision.

== Professional boxing record ==
25 fights	21 wins	3 losses
By knockout	1	1
By decision	20	2
Draws	1	

No.	Result	Record	Opponent	Type	Round, time	Date	Location	Notes
25	Loss	21–3–1	(Kazakhstan) Angelina Lukas	UD	10	6 Jun 2024	Ramindra Lumpini Stadium, Bangkok, Thailand	For vacant IBO female super-flyweight title
24	Win	21–2–1	(Argentina) Eliana Vanesa Orecchia	UD	8	17 Jun 2023	Club Ciclista Juninense, Junín, Argentina	
23	Loss	20–2–1	(Denmark) Dina Thorslund	TKO	8 (10), 1:12	25 Feb 2023	Gråkjær Arena, Holstebro, Denmark	For WBO female bantamweight title
22	Loss	20–1–1	(Argentina) Tamara Elisabet Demarco	TD	10 (10)	19 Mar 2022	Social y Deportivo Camioneros, Luis Guillon, Argentina	
21	Win	20–0–1	(Argentina) Natalia Josefina Alderete	UD	6	22 Dec 2021	Polideportivo de Tierras Altas, Tortuguitas, Argentina	
20	Win	19–0–1	(Argentina) Lucia De Los Angeles Ruiz	UD	6	9 Jul 2021	Social y Deportivo Camioneros, Luis Guillon, Argentina	
19	Win	18–0–1	(Argentina) Debora Gomez	UD	8	2 Apr 2021	Social y Deportivo Camioneros, Luis Guillon, Argentina	
18	Win	17–0–1	(Argentina) Ayelen Granadino	UD	10	19 Dec 2020	Social y Deportivo Camioneros, Luis Guillon, Argentina	Retained WBO female flyweight title
17	Win	16–0–1	(Venezuela) Niorkis Carreno	UD	10	20 Dec 2019	Social y Deportivo Camioneros, Luis Guillon, Argentina	Won vacant WBO female flyweight title
16	Win	15–0–1	(Argentina) Natalia Alderete	UD	6	25 Oct 2019	Club Sportivo Barracas, Buenos Aires, Argentina	
15	Win	14–0–1	(Argentina) Debora Gomez	UD	10	12 Jul 2019	Asociación de Fomento Social y Deportiva Mayo, Luis Guillón, Argentina	Won vacant FAB female, and South American female flyweight titles
14	Win	13–0–1	(Argentina) Virginia Carcamo	UD	8	25 Aug 2018	Monaco Hotel & Resort, Villa Carlos Paz, Argentina	
13	Win	12–0–1	(Argentina) Victoria Moreyra	MD	6	19 May 2018	Everton Club, Coronel Moldes, Argentina	
12	Win	11–0–1	(Argentina) Alejandra Rios	UD	10	19 Aug 2017	Club Atletico Central Argentino, Río Cuarto, Argentina	Retained FAB female flyweight title
11	Win	10–0–1	(Argentina) Valeria Almiron	UD	6	18 Feb 2017	Club Ciclista Juninense, Junín, Argentina	
10	Win	9–0–1	(Argentina) Cintia Gonzalez	UD	6	28 Jan 2017	Club Social y Deportivo Los Millonarios, Bragado, Argentina	
9	Win	8–0–1	(Colombia) Luna del Mar Torroba	SD	10	26 Nov 2016	Club Ciclista Juninense, Junín, Argentina	Won vacant FAB female flyweight title
8	Win	7–0–1	(Brazil) Fabiana Lopes	UD	6	22 Oct 2016	Sportsman Club Social y Deportivo, Villa Cañás, Argentina	
7	Win	6–0–1	(Argentina) Veronica Tesure	UD	4	27 Aug 2016	Club Ciclista Juninense, Junín, Argentina	
6	Win	5–0–1	(Argentina) Debora Gomez	SD	4	23 Jul 2016	Club Ciclista Juninense, Junín, Argentina	
5	Win	4–0–1	(Argentina) Rocio Cejas	KO	3 (4)	17 Jun 2016	Club General San Martín, Junín, Argentina	
4	Win	3–0–1	(Argentina) Catalina Alvarez	UD	4	20 May 2016	Club General San Martín, Junín, Argentina	
3	Draw	2–0–1	(Argentina) Andrea Sanchez	MD	4	16 Apr 2016	Club Atlético Talleres, Villa Constitución, Argentina	
2	Win	2–0	(Argentina) Adriana Moldonado	UD	4	13 Nov 2015	Junín, Buenos Aires, Argentina	
1	Win	1–0	(Argentina) Yisele Sosa	UD	4	18 Sep 2015	Club General San Martín, Junín, Argentina	
