= Aira Villegas =

Filipino boxer (born 1995)

Aira Villegas OLY
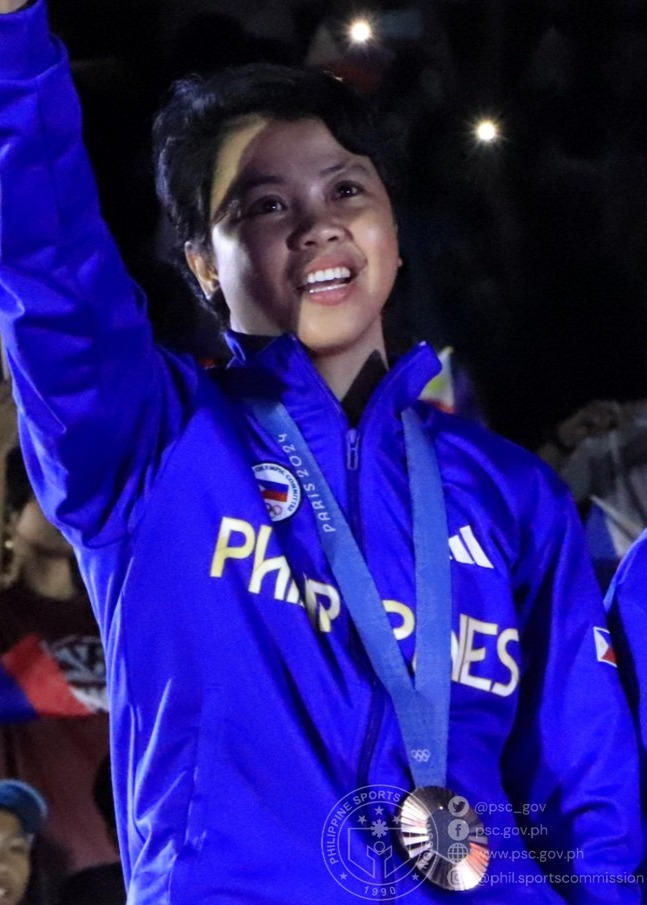
- Villegas in 2024

Personal information
- Nationality: Filipino
- Born: August 1, 1995 (age 31) Tacloban, Leyte, Philippines

Boxing career
- Weight class: Light flyweight
- Stance: Southpaw
Medal record
Women's boxing
Representing the Philippines
Event	1st	2nd	3rd
Summer Olympic Games	0	0	1
Southeast Asian Games	0	1	1
Total	0	1	2
Olympic Games
Bronze medal – third place	2024 Paris	Light flyweight
SEA Games
Silver medal – second place	2025 Thailand	Flyweight
Bronze medal – third place	2019 Philippines	Bantamweight

Aira Cordero Villegas OLY (born August 1, 1995) is a Filipino amateur boxer. She won a bronze medal in the inaugural women's Light Flyweight event at the 2024 Summer Olympics.

== Early life ==
Villegas was born on August 1, 1995, in Tacloban. Her older brother, Rominick, was a boxer who had won titles in their province and was a university scholar at the government-managed Leyte Sports Academy. He taught her boxing when she was nine years old, at first for fun. However, a serious hand fracture prevented him from making the national team. When Typhoon Yolanda hit Tacloban, their family lost their home. Motivated by her brother and her desire to provide for their family, she decided to pursue boxing.

== Career ==
In 2012, when she was 16, Villegas began her amateur career, joining the Association of Boxing Alliances in the Philippines (ABAP) National Open in Tagbilaran City. It was at this tournament that she was scouted by former Olympian and Asian Games gold medalist Violito Payla, who then brought her to Manila to train with the national team.

As a southpaw, Villegas has competed in at least two editions of the IBA Women's World Boxing Championships in the -52 kg division. For the 2022 edition in Turkey, she was forced to move to the -50 kg division after her previous class was scrapped.

In 2021, the Philippine Olympic Committee named Villegas as a beneficiary of the Olympics Solidarity Scholarship Grant by the International Olympic Committee.

She has also competed at the 2022 Asian Games which was held in September 2023 in Hangzhou, China. Villegas is also a Southeast Asian Games medalist, having won a bronze in the 2019 edition organized in the Philippines.

Villegas qualified for the 2024 Summer Olympics in Paris, by winning the quota bouts round, of the women's flyweight division, at the 2024 World Olympic Qualification Tournament 1 in Busto Arsizio, Italy.

At the Olympics, she won a bronze medal after losing to Turkish boxer Buse Naz Çakıroğlu in the semi-finals.

== Personal life ==
Villegas studies criminology at the University of Baguio.

== Summer Olympics ==
Light flyweight (50 kg) Olympic qualification

- Defeated Mckenzie Wright (Canada) PTS 3-2
- Defeated Sofie Rosshaug (Denmark) UD 5-0
- Defeated Zlatislava Chukanova (Bulgaria) UD 5-0

2024 Summer Olympics results

- Defeated Yasmine Mouttaki (Morocco) UD 5-0
- Defeated Roumaysa Boualam (Algeria) UD 5-0
- Defeated Wassila Lkhadiri (France) SD 3-2
- Lost to Buse Naz Çakıroğlu (Turkey) UD 5-0 (claim bronze medal)
