= Chuthamat Raksat =

Thai boxer (born 1993)

Personal information
- Nickname: Wan
- Nationality: Thai
- Born: 6 July 1993 (age 33) Nang Rong, Buriram, Thailand

Boxing career
- Weight class: Light flyweight Flyweight

Boxing record
- Total fights: 5
- Wins: 4
- Win by KO: 0
- Losses: 1
- Draws: 0
- No contests: 0
Medal record
Women's amateur boxing
Representing Thailand
World Championships
Bronze medal – third place	2014 Jeju	Light flyweight
Bronze medal – third place	2019 Ulan-Ude	Light flyweight
Asian Games
Silver medal – second place	2022 Hangzhou	Light flyweight
Asian Championships
Gold medal – first place	2024 Chiang Mai	Light flyweight
Southeast Asian Games
Gold medal – first place	2021 Hanoi	Light flyweight
Gold medal – first place	2025 Bangkok	Flyweight
Silver medal – second place	2015 Singapore	Light flyweight

Chuthamat Raksat (Thai: จุฑามาศ รักสัตย์; born 6 July 1993) is a Thai boxer. She won a medal at the 2019 AIBA Women's World Boxing Championships.

== Early life ==
Born in boxing family in Buriram in lower Isan (northeast region), her father is former Muaythai kickboxer. She started playing sports because she was not physically strong, starting with sepak takraw and football. Until she entered junior high school, the school's sepak takraw club was disbanded. Her older brother, who was a boxing trainer, convinced her to take up boxing instead. Her path as a boxer began from then on.

== 2024 Summer Olympics ==
In the 2024 Summer Olympics in Paris, Raksat competed in the women's 50 kg (flyweight) event. In the first stage (round of 32), she was drawn to advance to the next stage. In the second stage (round of 16), she defeated Sabina Bobokulova the representative from Uzbekistan 0–5.

In the quarter-finals (round of 8), as the eighth seed, she lost to the Chinese number one seed, Wu Yu 5–0.
