= Sarjubala Devi =

Indian boxer (born 1993)

- Born: Samjetsabam Sarjubala Devi; 1 June 1993 (age 33); Nongpok Lourembam, Thoubal, Manipur, India
- Occupation: Boxer Women's 48kg
- Known for: Light Welter-weight (48kg)

Medal record

Women's boxing

Representing India

World Championships
Silver medal – second place	2014 Jeju	Light flyweight

Samjetsabam Sarjubala Devi (born 1 March 1993) is an Indian woman boxer from Manipur and represented India at the 2016 Rio Olympics. After being awarded as the Best Boxer at Youth World Women Boxing Championship organised at Turkey, the Olympic Gold Quest (OGQ) announced support for Sarjubala Devi in 2012. She is referred to as the next Mary Kom. She used to be part of the 48 kg category but recently changed it to 51 kg category. After the change she claimed a gold medal at the National Women's Boxing Championship 2018 (Fly category). She also won the Best Boxer award at the 7th Youth Women National Championship in Patiala and in the 14th Senior Women Boxing Competition.

== Early life and career ==
Sarjubala Devi was born in a farmer's family to Sh Rajen Singh and Thoibi Devi. Being inspired by the stories of Mary Kom's success, she joined boxing school in 2005. Two years later, she joined the Sports Authority of India training centre in her city, Imphal India. Before winning Silver at the Junior Nationals she won the Sub-Junior Women National Championships both in years 2006 and 2008. She won the World Youth Championship in 2011 and later went on to win the Senior National Championship the same year. She has also participated in the 11th Senior Women National Boxing Championship in 2011.

Devi did not make it past the quarterfinals stage at the 2016 Rio Olympics. She also represented India at the Asian Games 2018 but was knocked out during the quarterfinals against China's Chang Yuan.

In February 2022 Devi had her first professional boxing match against Lulu Kayage of Tanzania. The match took place in Dubai. This was Kayage's seventeenth professional match but Devi won by a unanimous decision in what was reported as a one-sided match.

== Achievements ==
Sarjubala Devi is an honourable boxer, some of her achievements in the field of boxing are:

Year	Event	Location	Awards/ achievements
2006	Sub-Junior Women National Championships	India	Gold Medal
2008	Sub-Junior Women National Championships	India	Gold Medal
2009	Junior Women National Championships	Goa	Silver Medal
2010	National Boxing Championships	Bhopal	Gold Medal
2010	6th Youth Women National Boxing Championship	Guwahati	Best Boxer
2011	National Boxing Championships	Bhopal	Gold Medal
2011	Youth National Championships	India	Gold Medal
2011	7th Youth Women National Boxing Championship	Patiala	Best Boxer
2011	AIBA World Youth Boxing Championships	Antalya	Gold Medal
2013	14th Senior Women Boxing Competition	Khatima	Best Boxer
2014	Women World Boxing Championship	Jeju City, Korea	Silver Medal
