= Boxeo de Primera =

Argentine boxing television show

Boxeo de Primera is a boxing television show from Argentina, which is televised during weekend days on the Argentine sports television channel, TyC Sports. The show has been televised continuously since 1994 and is shown internationally live to many countries in the Americas, including Panama and the United States.

The show is telecast almost every Saturday night through the year and on select Friday nights also.

In 2023, the show celebrated its 30th anniversary.

== Select boxers and fights on the show ==
Boxeo de Primera has showcased fights by many boxers, including:

- Jorge Castro KO7 Derrick Harmon
- Omar Narvaez KO10 Rayonta Whitfield
- Marcela Acuna draw (tie) 10 Jackie Nava
- Yesica Bopp W10 Anastasia Toktaulova
- Gonzalo Basile
- Ulises Solis W12 Luis Lazarte

== Sportscasters ==
Silvana Carsetti and Sergio Charito are among the sportscasters who work regularly on Boxeo de Primera. Former 2 time world boxing champion Santos Laciar has also been a commentator, rather irregularly, at Boxeo de Primera. Late in 2021, former professional boxer Martin Antonio Coggi, who himself had been featured fighting at the show, made his debut as a Boxeo de Primera sportscaster.

== See also ==
- Jorge Basile - referee who has worked many fights shown on Boxeo de Primera
