= List of Czech records in Olympic weightlifting =

The following are the national records in Olympic weightlifting in the Czech Republic. Records are maintained in each weight class for the snatch lift, clean and jerk lift, and the total for both lifts by the Czech Weightlifting Federation (Český svaz vzpírání).

== Current records ==
Key to tables: Awaiting ratification Not ratified or later rescinded by ČSV

=== Men ===
Event	Record	Athlete	Date	Meet	Place	Ref
60 kg
Snatch	105 kg	Standard				
Clean & Jerk	129 kg	Standard				
Total	231 kg	Standard				
65 kg
Snatch	120 kg	Standard				
Clean & Jerk	148 kg	Standard				
Total	267 kg	Standard				
70 kg
Snatch	127 kg	Standard				
Clean & Jerk	160 kg	Standard				
Total	286 kg	Standard				
75 kg
Snatch	132 kg	Standard				
Clean & Jerk	165 kg	Standard				
Total	295 kg	Standard				
85 kg
Snatch	143 kg	Petr Mareček	2 November 2026	World Championships	Ningbo, China	
Clean & Jerk	174 kg	Petr Mareček	31 May 2026	Czech Championships	Holešov, Czech Republic	
Total	315 kg	Petr Mareček	31 May 2026	Czech Championships	Holešov, Czech Republic	
95 kg
Snatch	147 kg	Standard				
Clean & Jerk	178 kg	Standard				
Total	322 kg	Standard				
110 kg
Snatch	166 kg	Josef Kolář	6 November 2026	World Championships	Ningbo, China	
Clean & Jerk	200 kg	Josef Kolář	6 November 2026	World Championships	Ningbo, China	
Total	366 kg	Josef Kolář	6 November 2026	World Championships	Ningbo, China	
+110 kg
Snatch	166 kg	Josef Kolář	3 October 2026		Brno, Czech Republic	
Clean & Jerk	216 kg	Kamil Kučera	7 November 2026	World Championships	Ningbo, China	
Total	381 kg	Kamil Kučera	7 November 2026	World Championships	Ningbo, China	

=== Women ===
Event	Record	Athlete	Date	Meet	Place	Ref
49 kg
Snatch	62 kg	Standard				
Clean & Jerk	76 kg	Lenka Polášková	19 April 2026	European Championships	Batumi, Georgia	
Total	136 kg	Standard				
53 kg
Snatch	70 kg	Standard				
Clean & Jerk	89 kg	Petra Laštovková	30 May 2026	Czech Championships	Holešov, Czech Republic	
Total	156 kg	Petra Laštovková	19 April 2026	European Championships	Batumi, Georgia	
57 kg
Snatch	76 kg	Standard				
Clean & Jerk	94 kg	Standard				
Total	168 kg	Standard				
61 kg
Snatch	82 kg	Standard				
Clean & Jerk	100 kg	Standard				
Total	180 kg	Standard				
69 kg
Snatch	91 kg	Patricie Gasior	15 March 2026		Bohumín , Czech Republic	
Clean & Jerk	108 kg	Patricie Gasior	22 April 2026	European Championships	Batumi, Georgia	
Total	197 kg	Patricie Gasior	22 April 2026	European Championships	Batumi, Georgia	
77 kg
Snatch	97 kg	Eliška Šmigová	23 April 2026	European Championships	Batumi, Georgia	
Clean & Jerk	120 kg	Eliška Šmigová	23 April 2026	European Championships	Batumi, Georgia	
Total	217 kg	Eliška Šmigová	23 April 2026	European Championships	Batumi, Georgia	
86 kg
Snatch	96 kg	Eliška Šmigová	30 May 2026	Czech Championships	Holešov, Czech Republic	
Clean & Jerk	122 kg	Eliška Šmigová	3 October 2026		Brno, Czech Republic	
Total	218 kg	Eliška Šmigová	3 October 2026		Brno, Czech Republic	
+86 kg
Snatch	94 kg	Pavlína Šedá	28 March 2026		Plauen, Germany	
Clean & Jerk	117 kg	Pavlína Šedá	8 November 2026	World Championships	Ningbo, China	
Total	211 kg	Pavlína Šedá	8 November 2026	World Championships	Ningbo, China	

== Historical records ==
=== Men (2018–2025) ===
Event	Record	Athlete	Date	Meet	Place	Ref
55 kg
Snatch	103 kg	František Polák	25 September 2021	European Junior Championships	Rovaniemi, Finland	
Clean & Jerk	127 kg	František Polák	4 April 2021	European Championships	Moscow, Russia	
Total	224 kg	František Polák	4 April 2021	European Championships	Moscow, Russia	
61 kg
Snatch	112 kg	František Polák	11 September 2021		Prague, Czech Republic	
Clean & Jerk	136 kg	František Polák	19 June 2021		Havířov, Czech Republic	
Total	247 kg	František Polák	24 July 2021		Holešov, Czech Republic	
67 kg
Snatch	133 kg	Petr Petrov	8 December 2022	World Championships	Bogotá, Colombia	
Clean & Jerk	165 kg	Petr Petrov	5 April 2021	European Championships	Moscow, Russia	
Total	298 kg	Petr Petrov	17 April 2023	European Championships	Yerevan, Armenia	
73 kg
Snatch	135 kg	Petr Petrov	7 June 2019	British International Open	Coventry, Great Britain	
Clean & Jerk	171 kg	Petr Petrov	9 April 2019	European Championships	Batumi, Georgia	
Total	304 kg	Petr Petrov	9 April 2019	European Championships	Batumi, Georgia	
81 kg
Snatch	151 kg	Petr Mareček	21 December 2019		Boskovice, Czech Republic	
Clean & Jerk	182 kg	Petr Mareček	30 September 2023		Holešov, Czech Republic	
Total	330 kg	Petr Mareček	11 September 2023	World Championships	Riyadh, Saudi Arabia	
89 kg
Snatch	153 kg	Petr Mareček	23 April 2022		Hlohovec, Slovakia	
Clean & Jerk	183 kg	Petr Mareček	14 May 2022		Holešov, Czech Republic	
Total	335 kg	Petr Mareček	14 May 2022		Holešov, Czech Republic	
96 kg
Snatch	152 kg	Jiří Gasior	18 February 2024	European Championships	Sofia, Bulgaria	
Clean & Jerk	188 kg	Jiří Gasior	18 February 2024	European Championships	Sofia, Bulgaria	
Total	340 kg	Jiří Gasior	18 February 2024	European Championships	Sofia, Bulgaria	
102 kg
Snatch	157 kg	Josef Kolář	14 October 2023		Bohumín, Czech Republic	
Clean & Jerk	190 kg	Josef Kolář	13 December 2022	World Championships	Bogotá, Colombia	
Total	346 kg	Josef Kolář	13 December 2022	World Championships	Bogotá, Colombia	
109 kg
Snatch	162 kg	Josef Kolář	23 November 2024		Chemnitz, Germany	
Clean & Jerk	198 kg	Josef Kolář	23 November 2024		Chemnitz, Germany	
Total	360 kg	Josef Kolář	23 November 2024		Chemnitz, Germany	
+109 kg
Snatch	184 kg	Kamil Kučera	5 June 2022	European Championships	Tirana, Albania	
Clean & Jerk	241 kg	Jiří Orság	1 March 2020	Malta International Open	Cospicua, Malta	
Total	418 kg	Kamil Kučera	13 April 2019	European Championships	Batumi, Georgia	

=== Men (1998–2018) ===
Event	Record	Athlete	Date	Meet	Place	Ref
–56 kg
Snatch	104 kg	František Polák	7 October 2018	Youth Olympics	Buenos Aires, Argentina	
Clean & Jerk	130 kg	Petr Slabý	8 October 2003	European Junior Championships	Valencia, Spain	
Total	233 kg	František Polák	7 October 2018	Youth Olympics	Buenos Aires, Argentina	
–62 kg
Snatch	117 kg	Petr Stanislav	24 April 1999		Teplice, Czech Republic	
Clean & Jerk	150 kg	Petr Stanislav	24 April 1999		Teplice, Czech Republic	
Total	267 kg	Petr Stanislav	24 April 1999		Teplice, Czech Republic	
–69 kg
Snatch	137 kg	Petr Petrov	28 March 2018	European Championships	Bucharest, Romania	
Clean & Jerk	169 kg	Petr Petrov	4 April 2017	European Championships	Split, Croatia	
Total	305 kg	Petr Petrov	4 April 2017	European Championships	Split, Croatia	
–77 kg
Snatch	151 kg	Zbyněk Vacura	15 March 2003		Bohumín, Czech Republic	
Clean & Jerk	175 kg	Zbyněk Vacura	24 April 2000	European Championships	Sofia, Bulgaria	
Total	325 kg	Zbyněk Vacura	24 April 2000	European Championships	Sofia, Bulgaria	
–85 kg
Snatch	160 kg	Zbyněk Vacura	6 March 2004		Třinec, Czech Republic	
Clean & Jerk	190 kg	Zbyněk Vacura	6 March 2004		Třinec, Czech Republic	
Total	350 kg	Zbyněk Vacura	6 March 2004		Třinec, Czech Republic	
–94 kg
Snatch	166 kg	Tomáš Matykiewicz	22 October 2011		Havířov, Czech Republic	
Clean & Jerk	200 kg	Jiří Mandát	2 March 2002		Bohumín, Czech Republic	
Total	361 kg	Tomáš Matykiewicz	22 October 2011		Havířov, Czech Republic	
–105 kg
Snatch	180 kg	Tomáš Matykiewicz	13 October 2012		Sokolov, Czech Republic	
Clean & Jerk	220 kg	Tomáš Matykiewicz	8 May 2004		Havířov, Czech Republic	
Total	392 kg	Tomáš Matykiewicz	20 November 2003	World Championships	Vancouver, Canada	
+105 kg
Snatch	200 kg	Petr Sobotka	19 March 2005		Bohumín, Czech Republic	
Clean & Jerk	245 kg	Jiří Orság	11 November 2017	Czech Championships	Prague, Czech Republic	
Total	435 kg	Jiří Orság	11 November 2017	Czech Championships	Prague, Czech Republic	

=== Women (2018–2025) ===
Event	Record	Athlete	Date	Meet	Place	Ref
45 kg
Snatch	49 kg	Bára Gajdová	14 April 2024		Zlín, Czech Republic	
Clean & Jerk	60 kg	Bára Gajdová	14 April 2024		Zlín, Czech Republic	
Total	109 kg	Bára Gajdová	14 April 2024		Zlín, Czech Republic	
49 kg
Snatch	61 kg	Alena Sýkorová	13 November 2022		Prague, Czech Republic	
Clean & Jerk	75 kg	Dorota Dziková	6 July 2019		Olomouc, Czech Republic	
Total	133 kg	Alena Sýkorová	25 June 2022		Holešov, Czech Republic	
55 kg
Snatch	71 kg	Veronika Handlová	13 November 2022		Prague, Czech Republic	
Clean & Jerk	87 kg	Radka Klabalová	1 October 2023		Holešov, Czech Republic	
Total	154 kg	Vendula Šafratová	20 February 2020		Třinec, Czech Republic	
59 kg
Snatch	83 kg	Patricie Ježková	5 March 2023		Havířov, Czech Republic	
Clean & Jerk	98 kg	Radka Klabalová	28 October 2024	European Junior Championships	Raszyn, Poland	
Total	177 kg	Patricie Ježková	17 April 2023	European Championships	Yerevan, Armenia	
64 kg
Snatch	93 kg	Patricie Ježková	15 February 2024	European Championships	Sofia, Bulgaria	
Clean & Jerk	110 kg	Patricie Ježková	15 February 2024	European Championships	Sofia, Bulgaria	
Total	203 kg	Patricie Ježková	15 February 2024	European Championships	Sofia, Bulgaria	
71 kg
Snatch	94 kg	Patricie Ježková	9 November 2024		Heinsheim, Germany	
Clean & Jerk	112 kg	Patricie Ježková	2 March 2024		Samswegen, Germany	
Total	204 kg	Patricie Ježková	9 November 2024		Heinsheim, Germany	
76 kg
Snatch	91 kg	Simona Jeřábková	9 June 2024		Brno, Czech Republic	
Clean & Jerk	114 kg	Michaela Skleničková	25 April 2021		Havířov, Czech Republic	
Total	203 kg	Michaela Skleničková	25 April 2021		Havířov, Czech Republic	
81 kg
Snatch	89 kg	Eliška Šmigová	17 December 2023		Brno, Czech Republic	
Clean & Jerk	112 kg	Michaela Skleničková	9 April 2021	European Championships	Moscow, Russia	
Total	200 kg	Eliška Šmigová	17 December 2023		Brno, Czech Republic	
87 kg
Snatch	88 kg	Eliška Šmigová	22 April 2023	European Championships	Yerevan, Armenia	
Clean & Jerk	114 kg	Eliška Šmigová	19 February 2024	European Championships	Sofia, Bulgaria	
Total	201 kg	Eliška Šmigová	19 February 2024	European Championships	Sofia, Bulgaria	
+87 kg
Snatch	94 kg	Tereza Králová	9 June 2024		Brno, Czech Republic	
Clean & Jerk	117 kg	Tereza Králová	16 September 2023	World Championships	Riyadh, Saudi Arabia	
Total	207 kg	Tereza Králová	15 December 2024	World Championships	Manama, Bahrain	

=== Women (1998–2018) ===
Event	Record	Athlete	Date	Meet	Place	Ref
–48 kg
Snatch	62 kg	Veronika Věžníková	10 April 2016	European Championships	Førde, Norway	
Clean & Jerk	73 kg	Veronika Věžníková	10 April 2016	European Championships	Førde, Norway	
Total	135 kg	Veronika Věžníková	10 April 2016	European Championships	Førde, Norway	
–53 kg
Snatch	67 kg	Veronika Věžníková	1 November 2015		Prague, Czech Republic	
Clean & Jerk	78 kg	Veronika Věžníková	1 November 2015		Prague, Czech Republic	
Total	145 kg	Veronika Věžníková	1 November 2015		Prague, Czech Republic	
–58 kg
Snatch	77 kg	Marie Korčiánová	24 April 2000	European Championships	Sofia, Bulgaria	
Clean & Jerk	100 kg	Marie Korčiánová	24 April 2000	European Championships	Sofia, Bulgaria	
Total	177 kg	Marie Korčiánová	24 April 2000	European Championships	Sofia, Bulgaria	
–63 kg
Snatch	95 kg	Lenka Orságová	16 April 2005	European Championships	Sofia, Bulgaria	
Clean & Jerk	117 kg	Lenka Orságová	16 April 2005	European Championships	Sofia, Bulgaria	
Total	212 kg	Lenka Orságová	16 April 2005	European Championships	Sofia, Bulgaria	
–69 kg
Snatch	93 kg	Lenka Orságová	15 October 2005		Ostrava, Czech Republic	
Clean & Jerk	116 kg	Lenka Orságová	15 October 2005		Ostrava, Czech Republic	
Total	209 kg	Lenka Orságová	15 October 2005		Ostrava, Czech Republic	
–75 kg
Snatch	102 kg	Radka Ševčíková	17 April 1999	European Championships	A Coruña, Spain	
Clean & Jerk	127 kg	Radka Ševčíková	17 April 1999	European Championships	A Coruña, Spain	
Total	230 kg	Radka Ševčíková	17 April 1999	European Championships	A Coruña, Spain	
–90 kg
Snatch	102 kg	Radka Ševčíková	9 November 2002		Ostrava, Czech Republic	
Clean & Jerk	133 kg	Radka Ševčíková	23 February 2002		Bohumin, Czech Republic	
Total	232 kg	Radka Ševčíková	20 October 2001		Bohumin, Czech Republic	
+90 kg
Snatch	80 kg	Tereza Králová	4 April 2017	European Championships	Split, Croatia	
Clean & Jerk	96 kg	Lenka Ledvinová	9 May 2010		Prague, Czech Republic	
Total	172 kg	Tereza Králová	4 April 2017	European Championships	Split, Croatia	
