= Von Gemmingen =

Von Gemmingen may refer to:

- Eberhard von Gemmingen is (1936-) the editor-in-chief of the German department of Vatican Radio.
- Uriel von Gemmingen (1468-9 February 1514) was appointed Archbishop of Mainz on 27 September 1508, a prince elector, and chancellor to Emperor Maximillian I on 23 April 1509.

== See also ==
- Gemmingen is a town in the district of Heilbronn in Baden-Württemberg in southern Germany.
