= Matykiewicz =

Matykiewicz is a Polish surname. Notable people with the surname include:

- Bruno Matykiewicz (born 1959), Polish weightlifter
- Eduard Matykiewicz (born 1946), Czech senator
- Tomáš Matykiewicz (born 1982), Czech weightlifter
