= Bad Rappenau =

Spa town in Baden-Württemberg, Germany

- Town
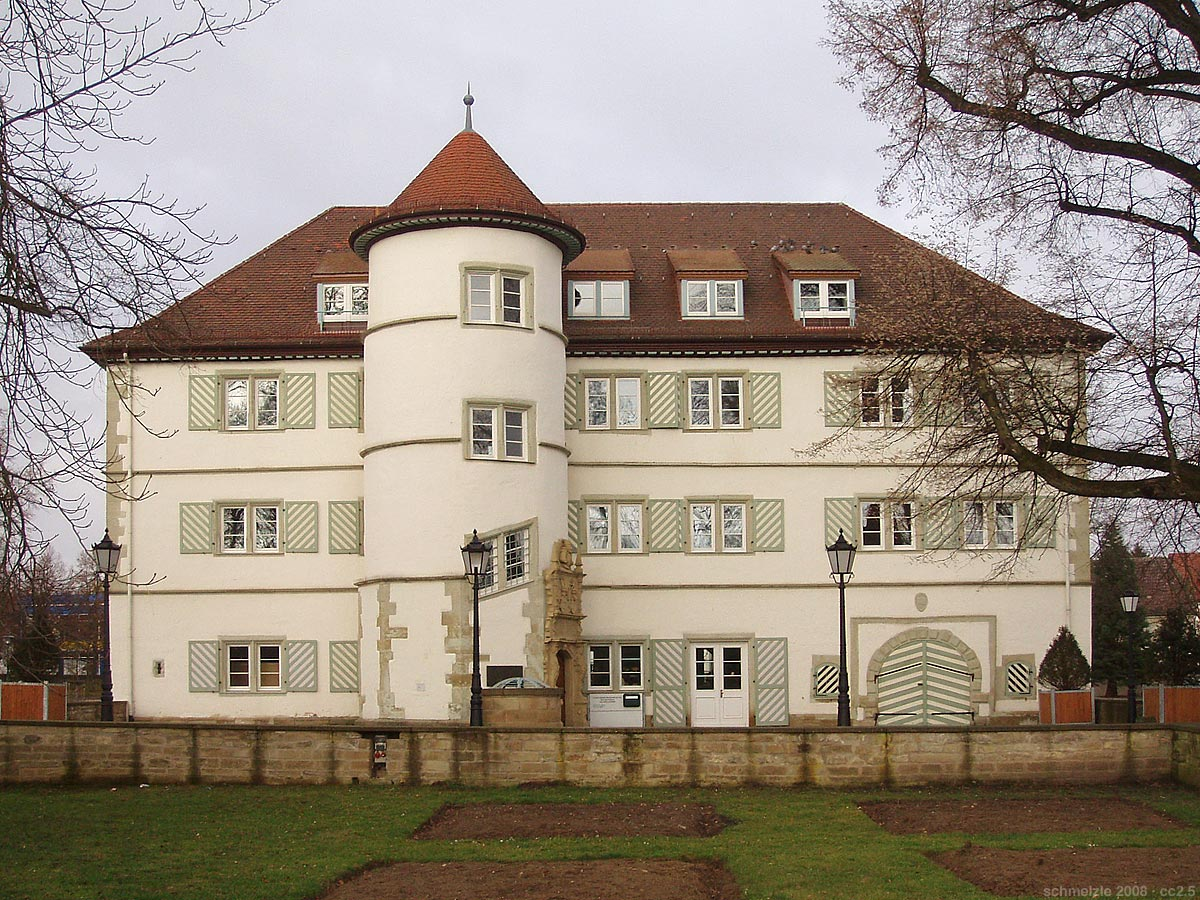

- Coat of arms

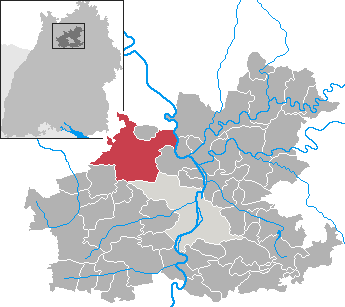
- Location of Bad Rappenau within Heilbronn district
- Interactive map of Bad Rappenau
- Location within Germany Location within Baden-Württemberg
- Coordinates: 49°14′N 9°6′E
- Country: Germany
- State: Baden-Württemberg
- Admin. region: Stuttgart
- District: Heilbronn
- Subdivisions: 10

Government
  - Mayor (2018–26): Sebastian Frei (Ind.)

Area
  - Total: 73.56 km^{2} (28.40 sq mi)
- Elevation: 235 m (771 ft)

Population (2025-12-31)
  - Total: 22,728
  - Density: 309.0/km^{2} (800.2/sq mi)
- Time zone: UTC+01:00 (CET)
  - Summer (DST): UTC+02:00 (CEST)
- Postal codes: 74906
- Dialling codes: 07264, 07066, 07268, 06268, 07266
- Vehicle registration: HN
- Website: www.badrappenau.de

Bad Rappenau (German: [baːt ˈʁapənaʊ]; South Franconian: Rappene) is a city municipality in the district of Heilbronn in Baden-Württemberg in southern Germany. It is situated about 15 kilometres (9 mi) northwest of Heilbronn.

== Geography ==
Bad Rappenau is situated in the northeastern Kraichgau.

=== Neighbouring municipalities ===
Neighbouring towns and villages of Bad Rappenau are (clockwise from the east): Gundelsheim, Offenau and Bad Wimpfen (all of the district of Heilbronn), Heilbronn, Massenbachhausen and Kirchardt (both of the district of Heilbronn), Sinsheim, Neckarbischofsheim and Helmstadt-Bargen (all of the Rhein-Neckar-Kreis), Hüffenhardt (Neckar-Odenwald-Kreis), Siegelsbach (district of Heilbronn) and Haßmersheim (Neckar-Odenwald-Kreis). Bad Rappenau has combined with Kirchardt and Siegelsbach to form a joint association of administrations.

=== Structure ===
The municipality consists of the town itself and the villages Babstadt, Bonfeld, Fürfeld, Grombach, Heinsheim, Obergimpern, Treschklingen, and Wollenberg.

Besides there are the hamlets Zimmerhof, Kohlhof, Maierhof, Bartsmühle, Kugelmühle, and Sommersmühle. The hamlets Oberbiegelhof and Unterbiegelhof belong to Babstadt; Eichhäuser Hof, Obere Mühle, and Untere Mühle belong to Bonfeld; Burg Ehrenberg belongs to Heinsheim; Eulenberg(er)hof, Wagenbach, Obere Mühle, and Portland-Zementwerk belong to Obergimpern; and Neumühle belongs to Wollenberg. Gone resp. non-existent villages are Niuern and Speceshart on the communal land of Rappenau, Eichhausen on the communal land of Bonfeld, und Battenhausen on the communal land of Grombach.

== History ==
Rappenau was first mentioned in 1343. According to other sources the village was previously named as Rappenheim due to its founder Rappo who was not in connection with ministerials. It is presumed that the settlement began around the 8th century. In the Middle Ages there were three villages near Rappenau: the upper village, the older lower village, and the no-more existent village Speßhardt, besides several hamlets.

Rappenau belonged to the Lords of Vaihingen and Württemberg until 1339, since 1344 it still only belonged to the Lords of Württemberg. The upper and lower village grew together to a united village, bordering at the Mühlbach in the south. Eberhard von Gemmingen had built a water castle in 1601. In Thirty Years' War the village burned down several times. By the German Mediatisation the village came to Baden in 1806.

After discovering a brine 175m below earth surface in 1822, there were big efforts to use the brine as a remedy. However, Baden had no interests in creating a bath in the first time. So there was founded a community to create the Sophienbad (named after grand duchess Sophie von Baden) on May 15, 1834. Soon it turned out that the bath was unable to be financed, so it had to be closed. In 1845 the brine bath was opened, further increasing its capacity. In 1862 and 1882 a steam bath and brine inhalations were added.

In 1887 the children's spa rooms were opened. In 1912 Prof. Dr. Oskar Vulpius opened a sanatorium containing 120 beds to treat bone, joint, and gland sufferings. Meanwhile, a new brine bath was built and opened in 1903. In 1921 there were around 84,500 overnight stays. The recognition of being a spa town goes back to a decree of 1930 by the ministry of Baden. Since then the municipality took the name Bad Rappenau. After World War II cure bustle increased heavily. In 1952 it has been the seventh biggest spa town in Baden. In the 1970s there were four special clinics hosting around 600,000 overnight stays.

Due to the administration reform of 1936 Bad Rappenau turned into the district of Sinsheim. On April 1, 1950, the village Zimmerhof has been incorporated into the municipality. From 1971 to 1973 eight further municipalities had been incorporated into Bad Rappenau. Due to the district reform of January 1, 1973, Bad Rappenau turned into the district of Heilbronn. This district belongs to the administrative district of Stuttgart, so a municipality previously belonging to Baden is now administered by Württemberg. Also in 1973 the municipality got town rights. On January 1, 2003, Bad Rappenau became a Große Kreisstadt.

=== Religions ===
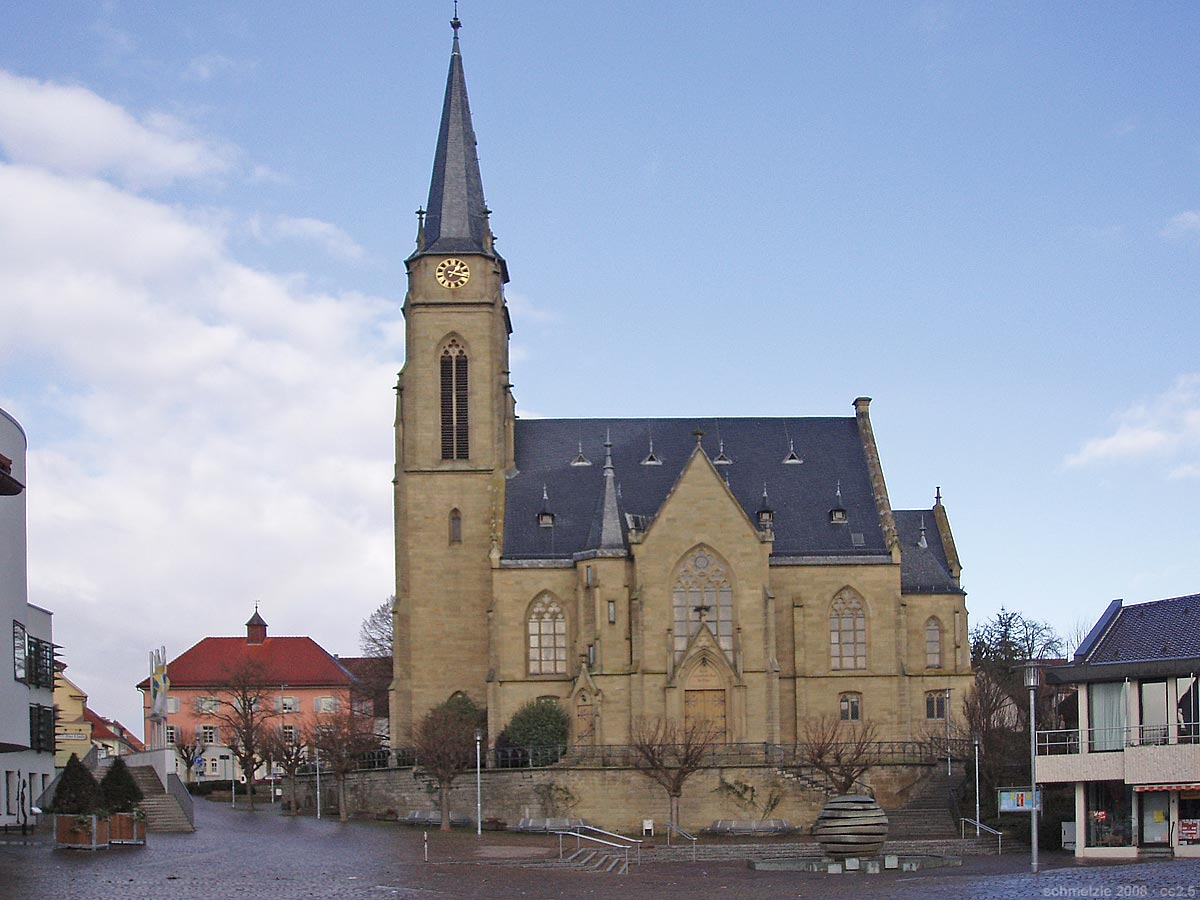
Protestant church

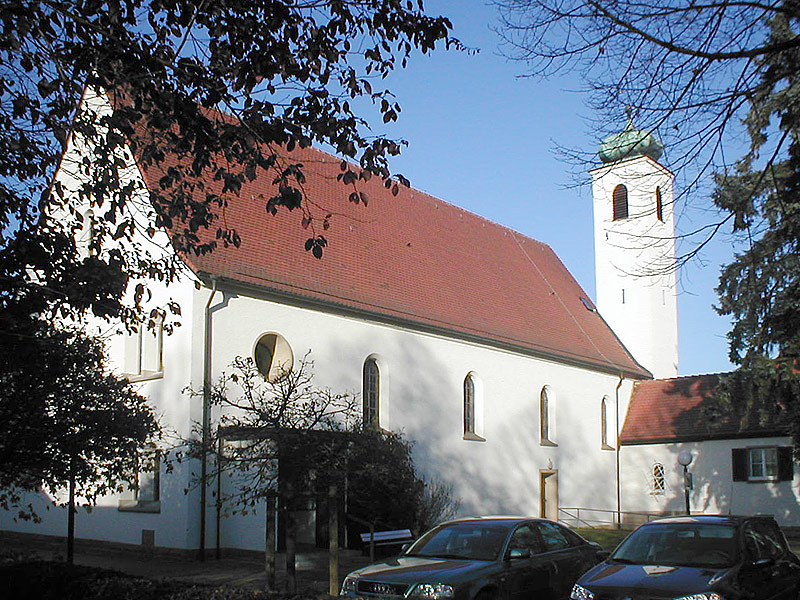
Catholic church Herz-Jesu-Kirche

Protestants;

The area surrounding the town of Bad Rappenau originally belonged to the Bishopric of Worms, an ecclesiastical principality of the Holy Roman Empire. In 1343, the Bishop of Worms permitted Konrad von Helmstatt to establish the Rappenau branch chapel of the Wimpfen parish church as a separate parish church.

Beginning in 1530, the local lords introduced the Protestant Reformation, and as a result, Rappenau became a predominantly Protestant community for centuries.

After the transfer to Baden in 1806, the congregation became a member of what later became the Evangelical Church in Baden. In 1887, the congregation laid the foundation stone for a new church, which is today's Bad Rappenau Town Church. The Bad Rappenau parish originally belonged to the Sinsheim church district, then in 1975 it became part of the Eppingen-Bad Rappenau district. On January 1, 2005, it merged with the Sinsheim church district to form the new Kraichgau church district .

In other villages of Bad Rappenau, there are also different parishes belonging to the Protestant Parish of Baden. Only the parishes of Bonfeld and Fürfeld belong to the Protestant Parish of Württemberg, since these villages belonged to Württemberg in former times.

Catholics

In the 19th century, there were also Catholics moving to Bad Rappenau. Previously, they were cared for by the neighbouring parish of Siegelsbach. In 1896, they began having their own services in a room in the water castle. In 1929, the Herz-Jesu-Kirche (Note: Herz-Jesu-Kirche translates as "Sacred Heart Church".) was built, and was expanded in 1954. Since its foundation, it belonged to the Roman Catholic Archdiocese of Freiburg (deanery Kraichgau).

Jewish community

Since the 16th century, there had been a small Jewish community in Rappenau, which was generally poor. In 1802, there were five Jewish families; and, in 1825, there were six. A small synagogue was built in 1843, and the Jewish cemetery along the road to Siegelsbach was established in 1881. The community size was over 80 members in 1875, but declined significantly over the following years due to emigration. In 1900, 46 members lived in the town, and in 1933, only 10. In 1937, the community was dissolved, the synagogue sold, and converted into a milk collection point.

During the Kristallnacht (November pogrom) of 1938, riots broke out against the few Jews still living in Rappenau. Four of the five Jews still living in Rappenau in 1940 were killed during the deportation of Jews from Germany in 1940.

=== Incorporations ===
Following communal lands and villages had been introduced into Bad Rappenau. As far as not given otherwise they belonged to the district of Sinsheim until 1972. All of them came to the district of Heilbronn according to the district reform on January 1, 1973.

- April 1, 1950: Zimmerhof
- April 1, 1952: Zimmerhöferfeld
- January 1, 1971: Babstadt, Treschklingen
- January 1, 1972: Obergimpern, Wollenberg
- March 1, 1972: Heinsheim (district of Mosbach)
- January 1, 1973: Fürfeld (district of Heilbronn), Grombach
- November 1, 1973: Bonfeld (district of Heilbronn)

=== Development of population ===
year	inhabitants
December 1, 1871	1,441
December 1, 1880^{1}	1,665
December 1, 1890^{1}	1,577
December 1, 1900^{1}	1,628
December 1, 1910^{1}	1,726
June 16, 1925^{1}	1,862
June 16, 1933^{1}	1,918
May 17, 1939^{1}	1,979
December 1945	2,328
September 13, 1950^{1}	2,962

year	inhabitants
6 June 1961^{1}	3,899
27 May 1970^{1}	5,404
31 December 1975	13,361
31 December 1980	13,826
27 May 1987^{1}	14,461
31 December 1990	15,884
31 December 1995	18,562
31 December 2000	19,884
31 December 2005	20,600
31 December 2010	20,505

^{1} results of censuses

== Politics ==
=== District council ===
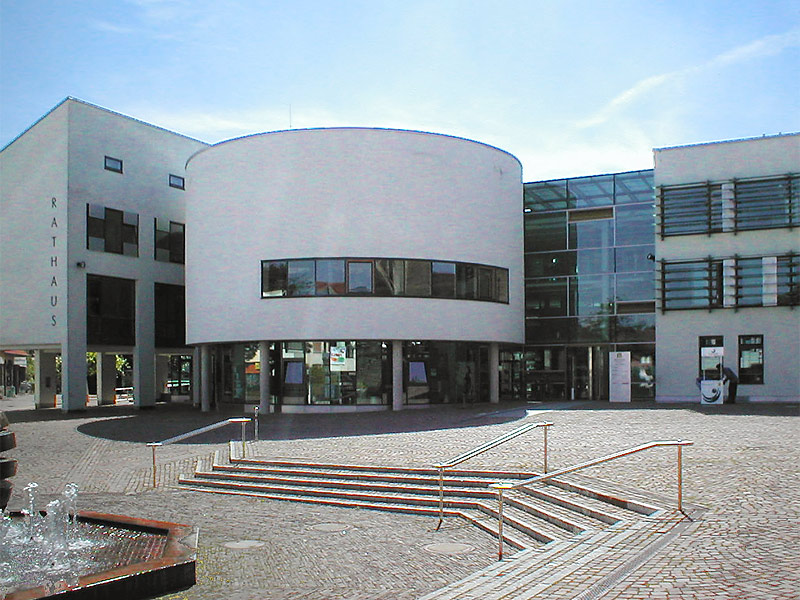
Town hall

Following the municipal election of 25 May 2014, the district council of Bad Rappenau has 34 seats. The election result is as follows:

Party	Vote	Change	Seats	Change
CDU	40.0%	− 3.3	14	− 3
SPD	24.9%	+ 0.6	8	− 2
ödp	10.4%	+ 0.3	4	± 0
GAL	12.6%	+ 3.9	4	+ 1
Freie Wähler^{*}	12.0%	− 1.9	4	− 1
Total	100%		34	
Turnout: 43.0%

* In 2009, together with the FDP

=== Mayor ===
In the past the local lord appointed a bailiff (vogt) to administer the village of Rappenau. Later the Grand Duchy of Baden established a mayor to head the municipal administration assisted by a council. Being a Große Kreisstadt since 1 January 2003, the mayor has the title Oberbürgermeister. His deputy is called the Bürgermeister.

Bürgermeister and Oberbürgermeister

- 1821–1831: Johann Jakob Freudenberger
- 1831–1836: various mayors
- 1836–1850: Christoph Reichardt
- 1850–1869: Johann Adam Rothenhöfer
- 1869–1877: Georg Zimmermann
- 1877–1889: Emil Kachel
- 1889–1895: Wilhelm Straub
- 1895–1922: Philipp Freudenberger
- 1922–1945: Hermann Hofmann
- 1945–1946: Walter Staubitz
- 1946–1978: Fritz Hagner
- 1978–2002: Gerd Zimmermann
- 2002–2018: Hans Heribert Blättgen
- since 2018: Sebastian Frei

=== Arms and flag ===
Arms of Bad Rappenau

Blazon: In gold on a blue sign a jumping black horse. The town colours are black and yellow.

The seal of Rappenau (1820) shows in blue two golden beams. The arms and flag were given by the ministry of the interior on September 26, 1957.

== Twin towns – sister cities ==
Bad Rappenau is twinned with:

- Contrexéville, France (1982)
- Llandrindod Wells, Wales, United Kingdom (2001)

== Culture and sights ==
=== Museums ===
Since 1989 Bad Rappenau has a museum showing the history of brine and bathing in the town.

=== Notable buildings ===
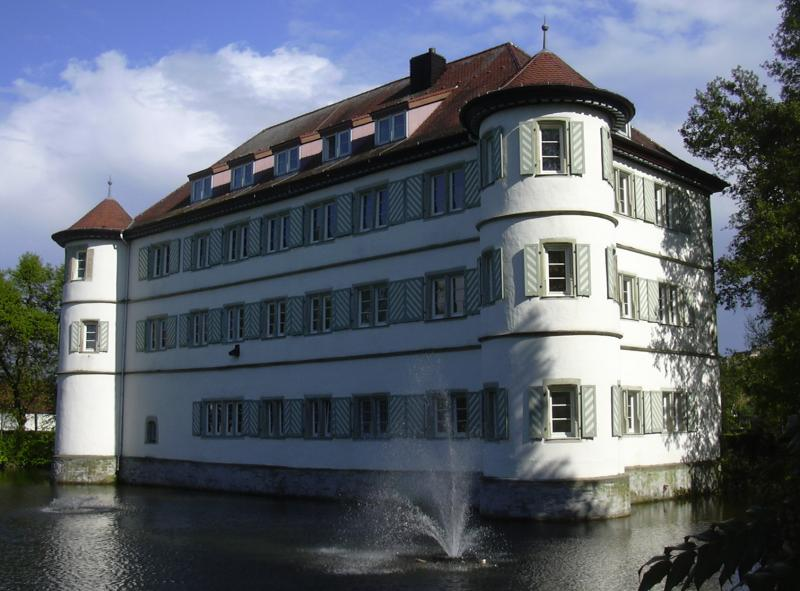
The castle

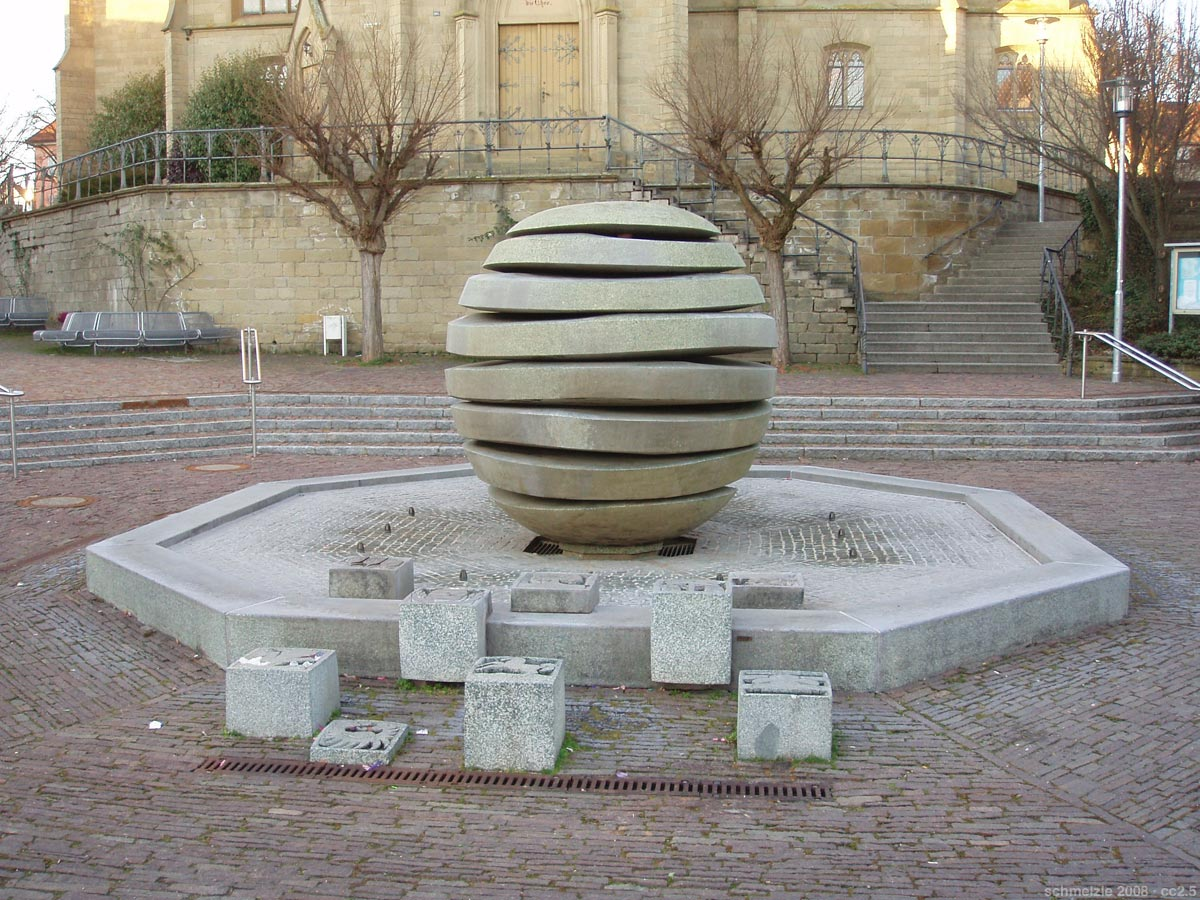
Fountain

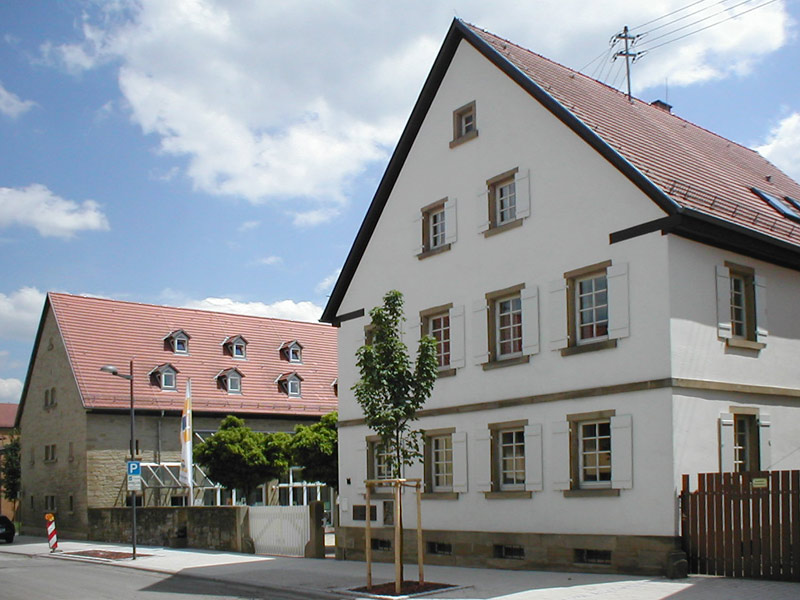
Culture centre

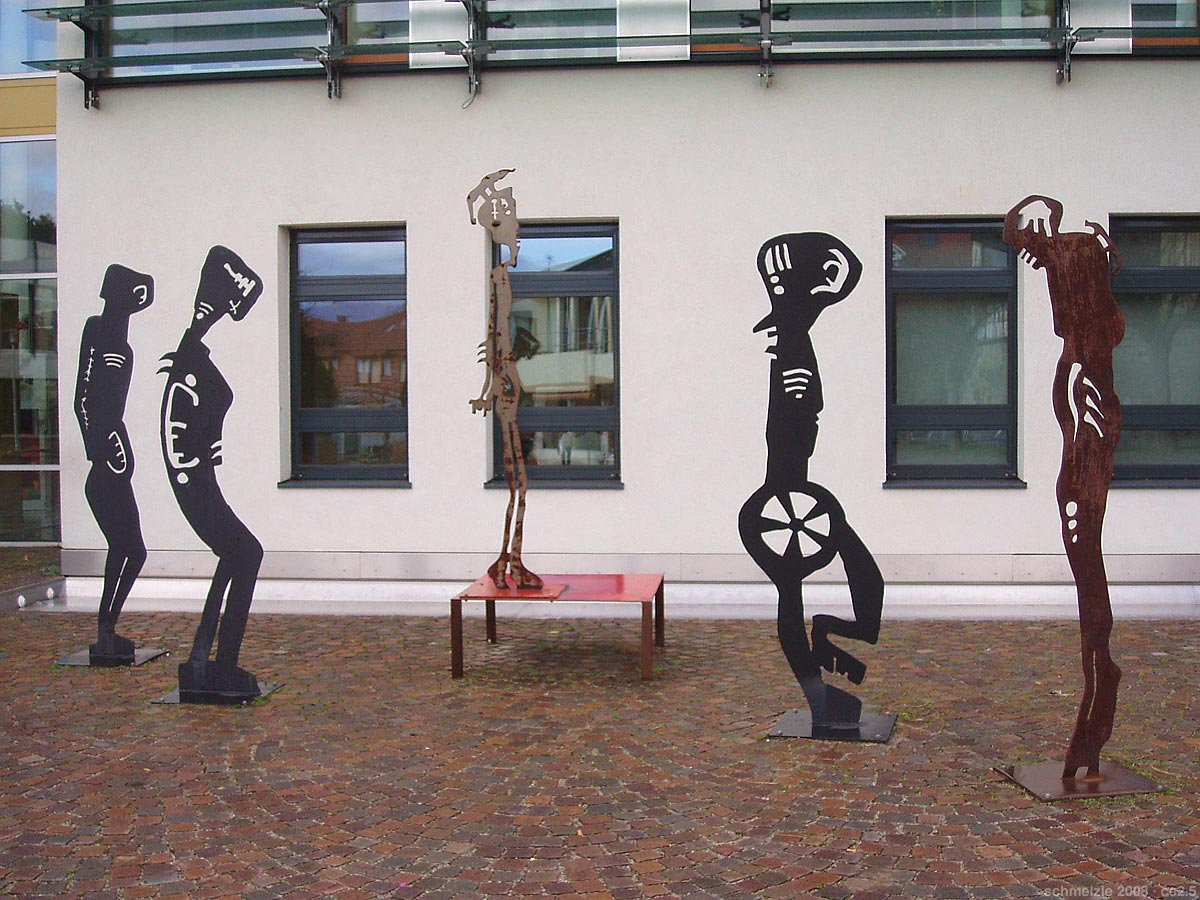
Sculptures

Next to the parish church there is the old town hall built in 1841 being the first one. Nearby the old town hall there is a fountain of 1928 having the inscription: Ruhe ist des Bürgers erste Pflicht - Im Wein liegt Wahrheit, im Wasser liegt Klarheit. - "The first citizen's duty is silence - In wine there is truth, in water there is clearness." In the town there is some old half-timbering, e. g. the Dominikanerhof. The station is a building of classicism in times of rail construction.

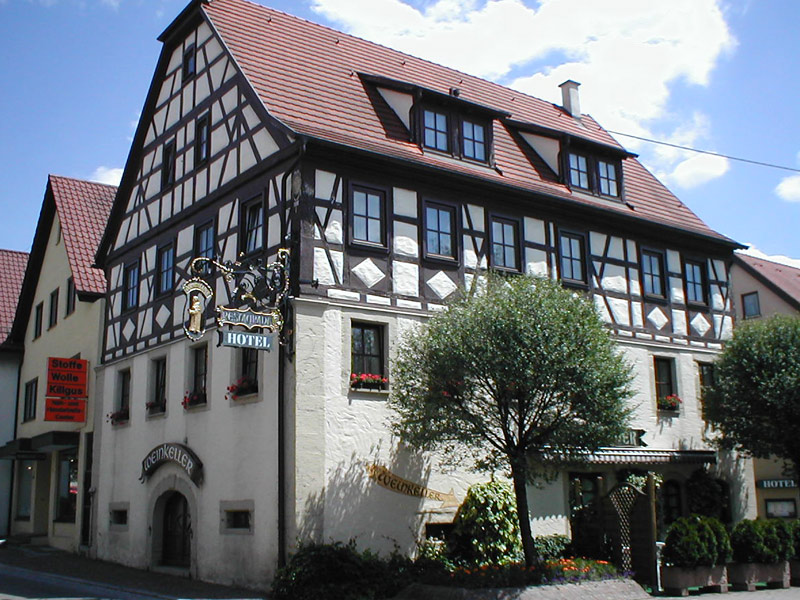
Dominikanerhof

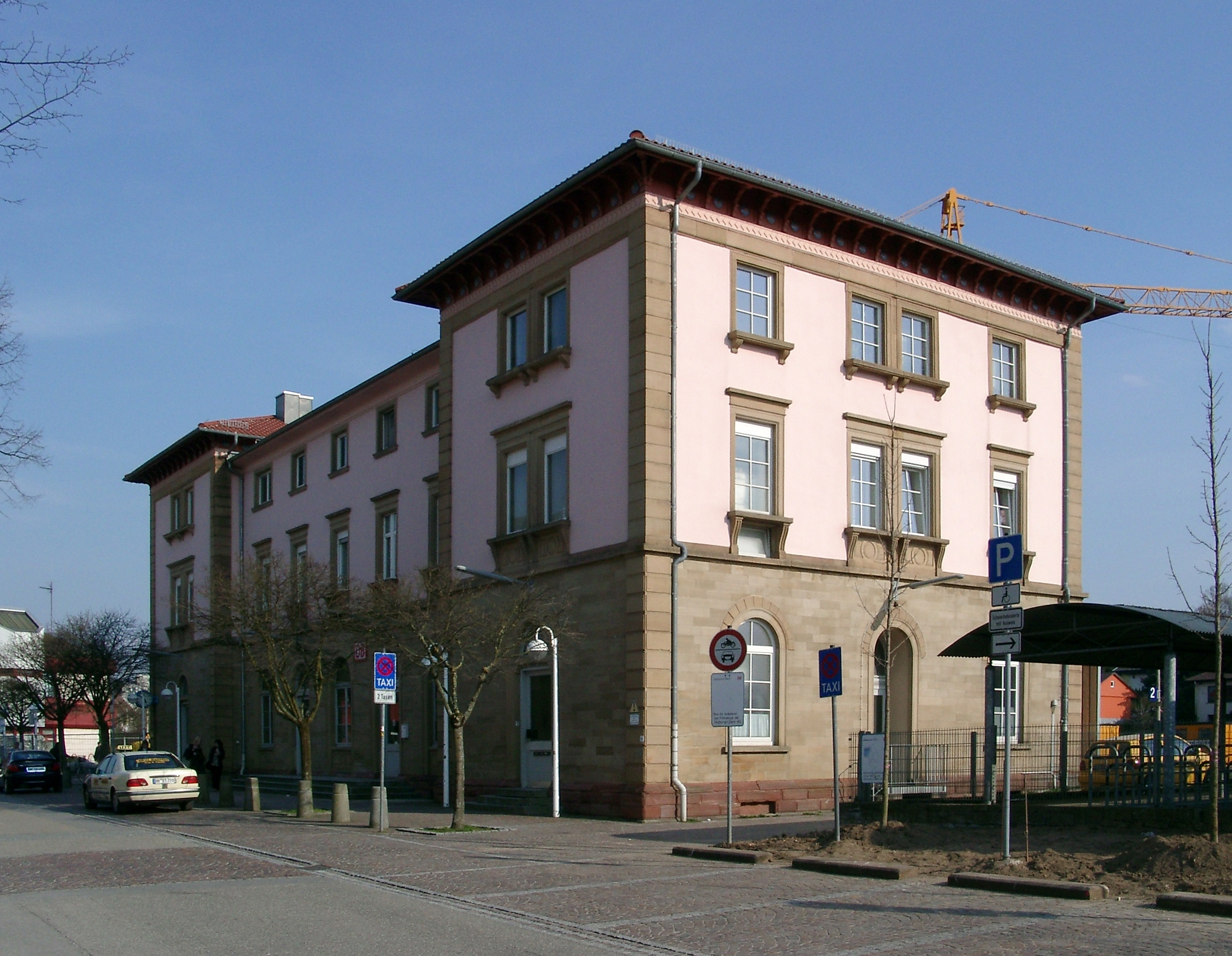
Station

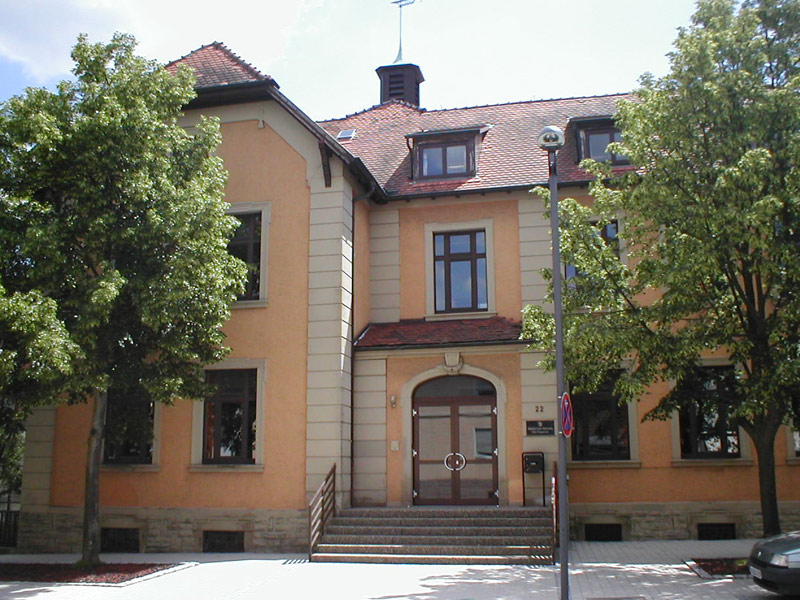
School house of 1906

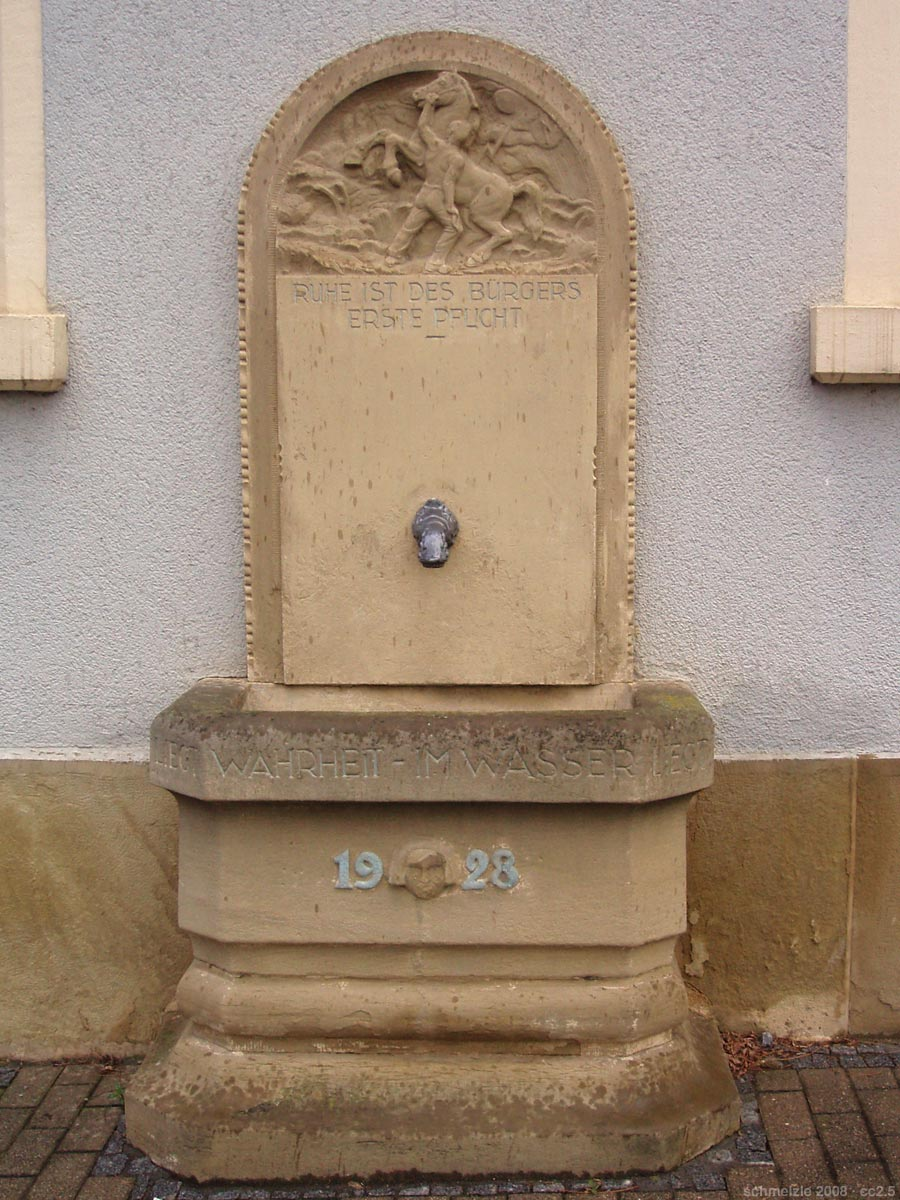
Old fountain of 1928

On the urban cemetery lies Georg Christian Heinrich Rosentritt who discovered salt occurrences in 1822. There is also a war memorial.

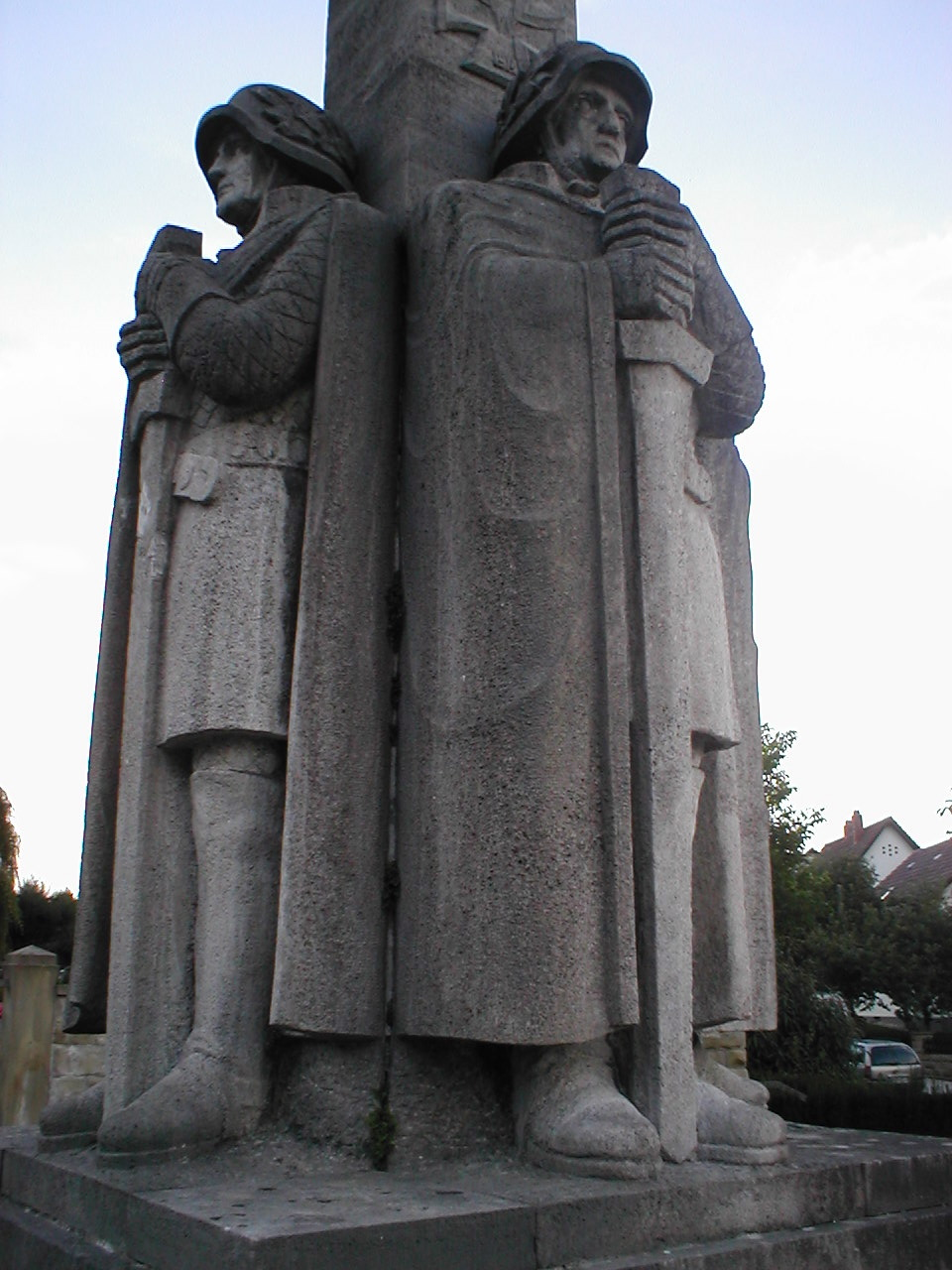
War memorial of 1934

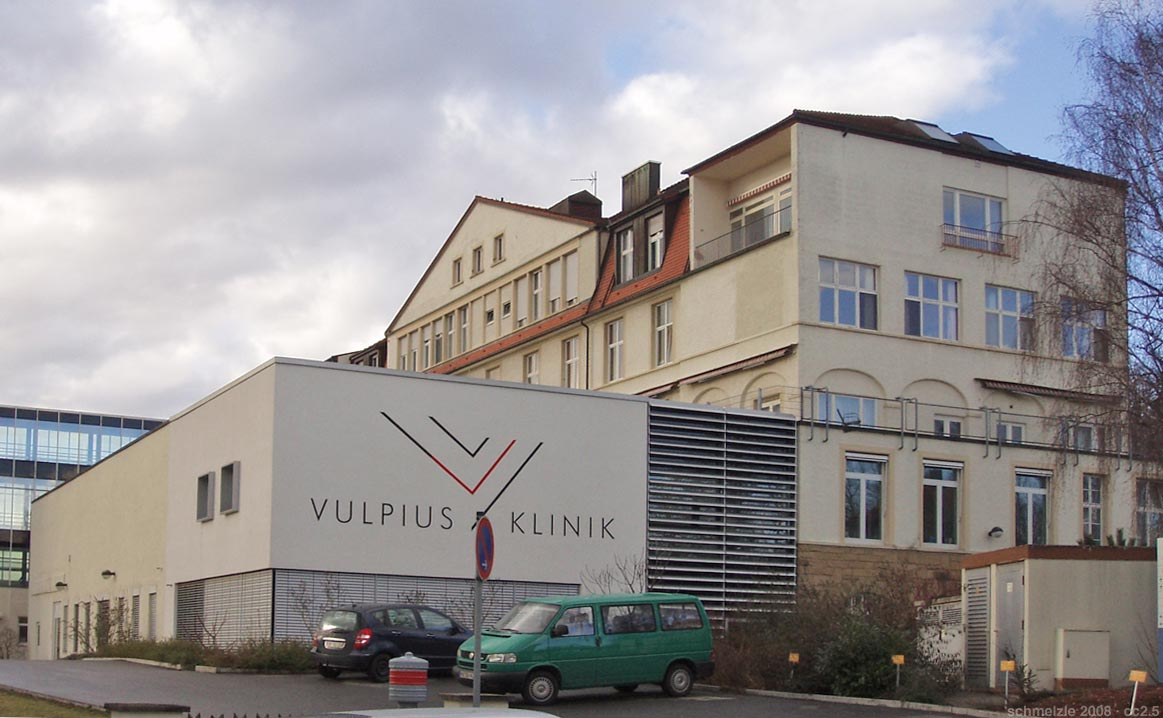
Vulpiusklinik, hospital

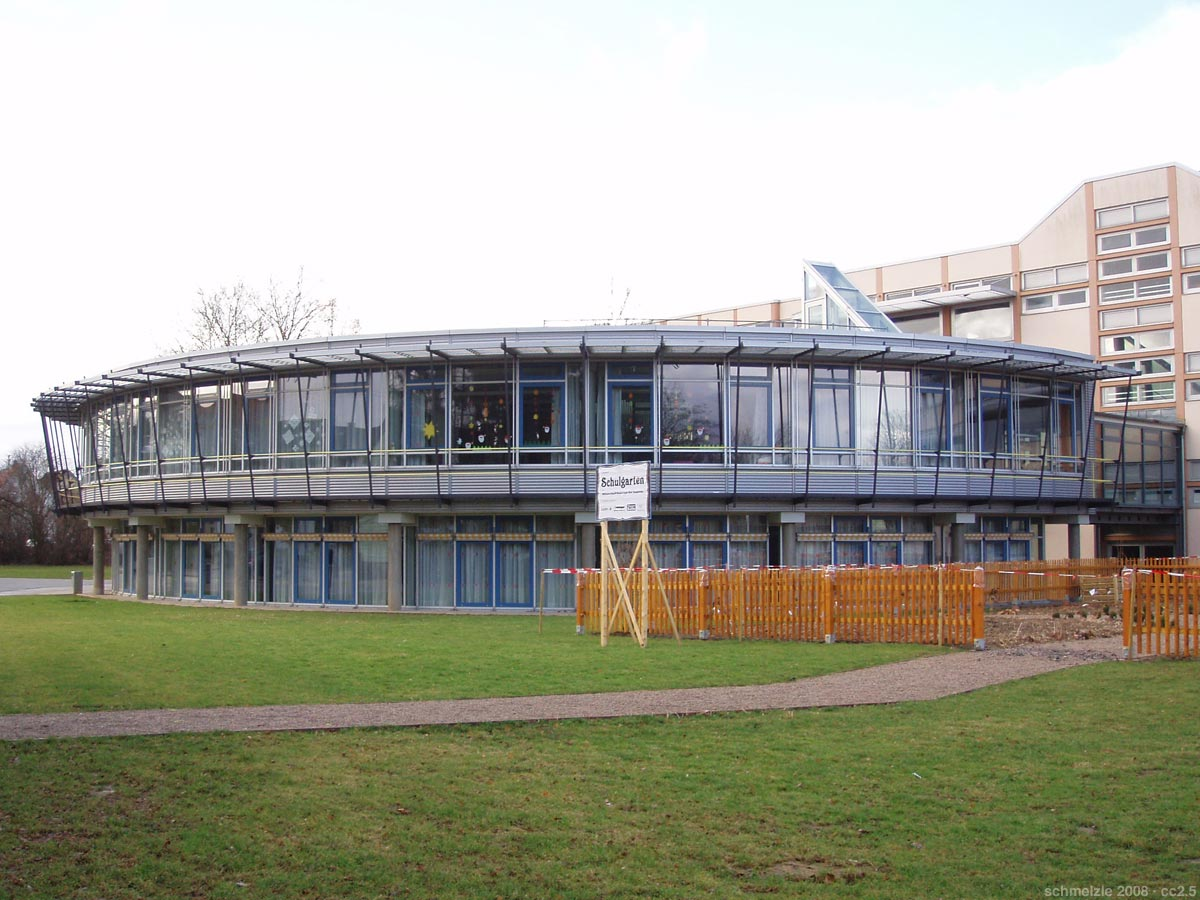
School centre

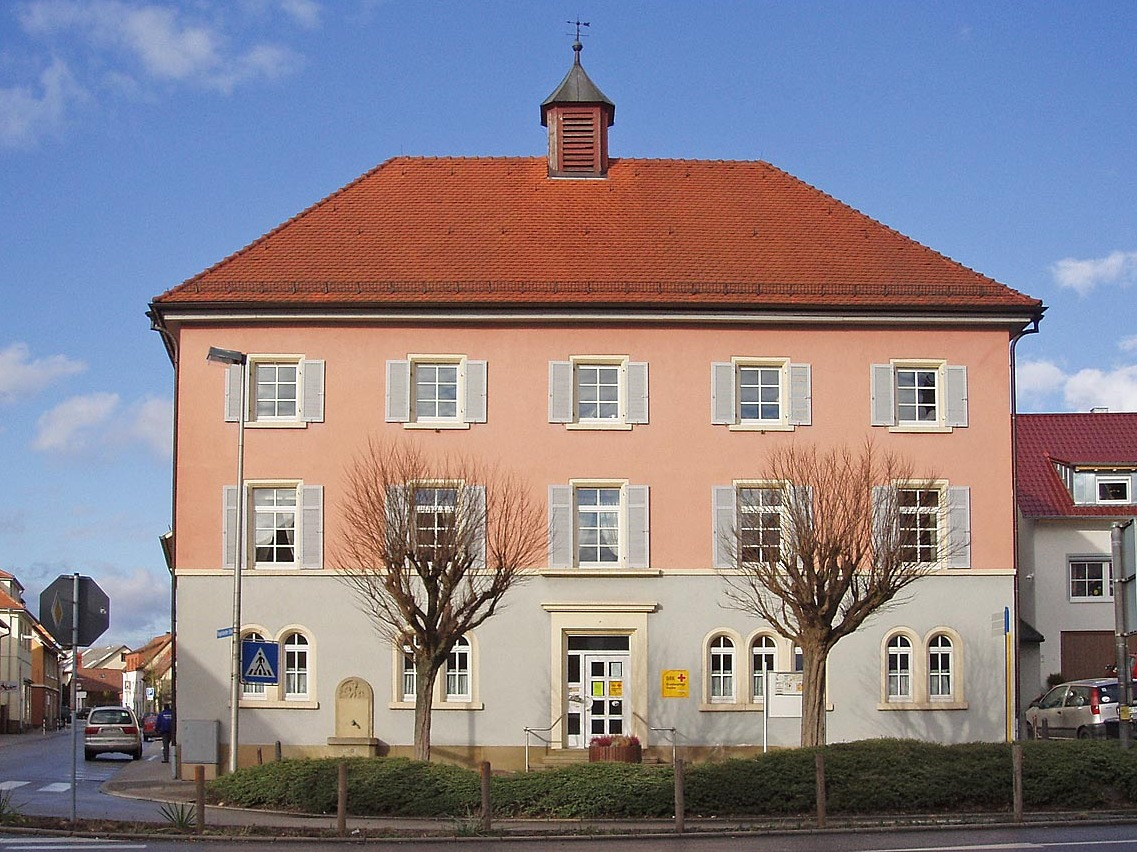
Old town hall

=== Parks ===
Bad Rappenau has several parks at its disposal: the Schlosspark in the west around of the water castle and the Salinengarten including Hohenstadter Grund and Kurpark in the east.

From April 25 to October 5, 2008, the Landesgartenschau of Baden-Württemberg took place in Bad Rappenau. One of the main attractions was the graduation tower. The three parks have been connected and upgraded by this event.

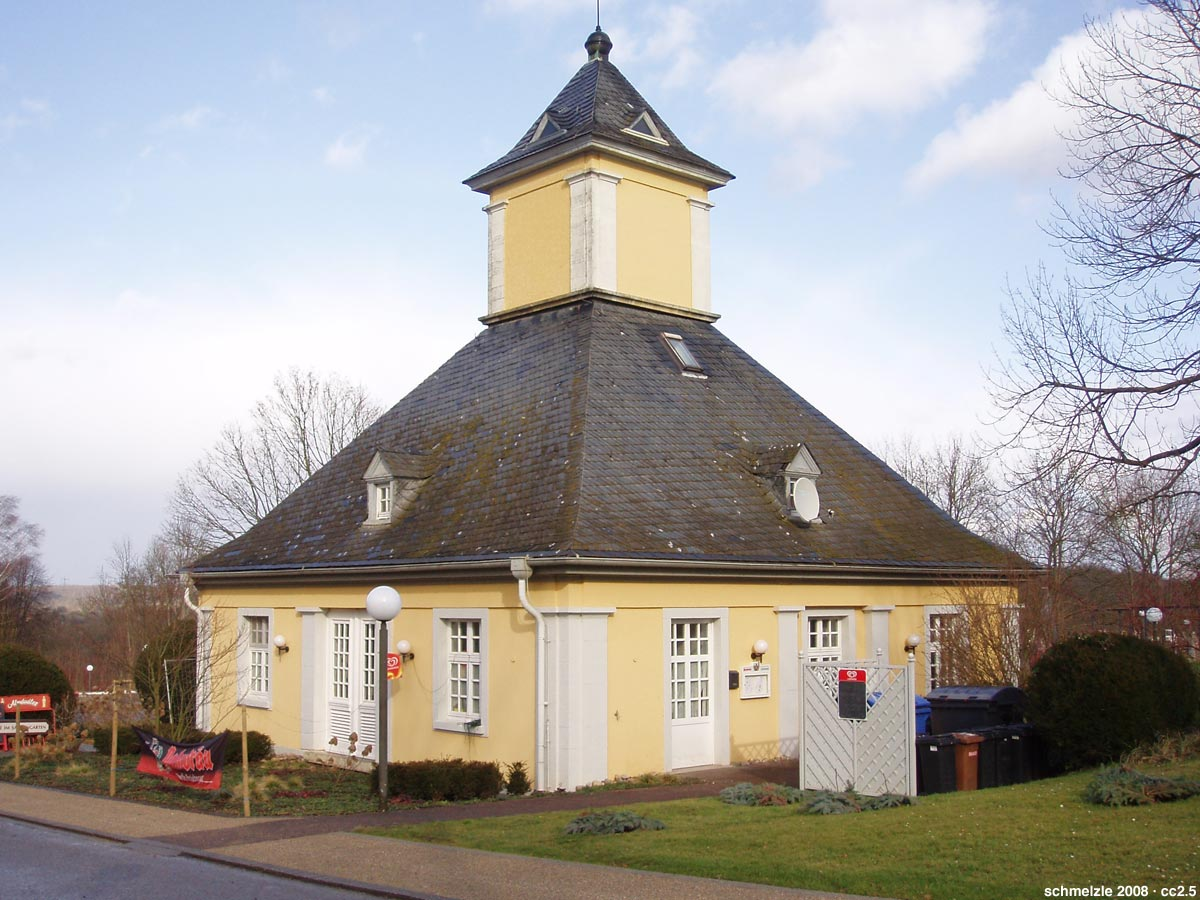
Trafo station

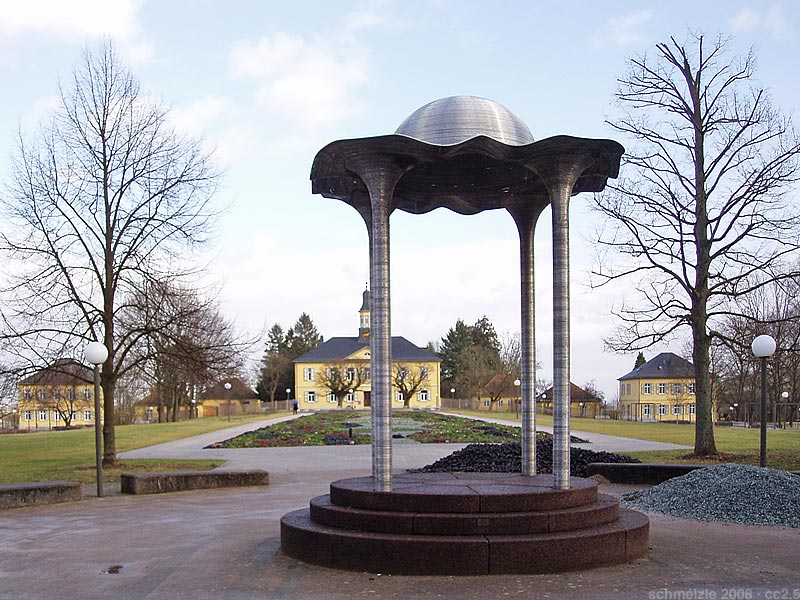
Monopteros

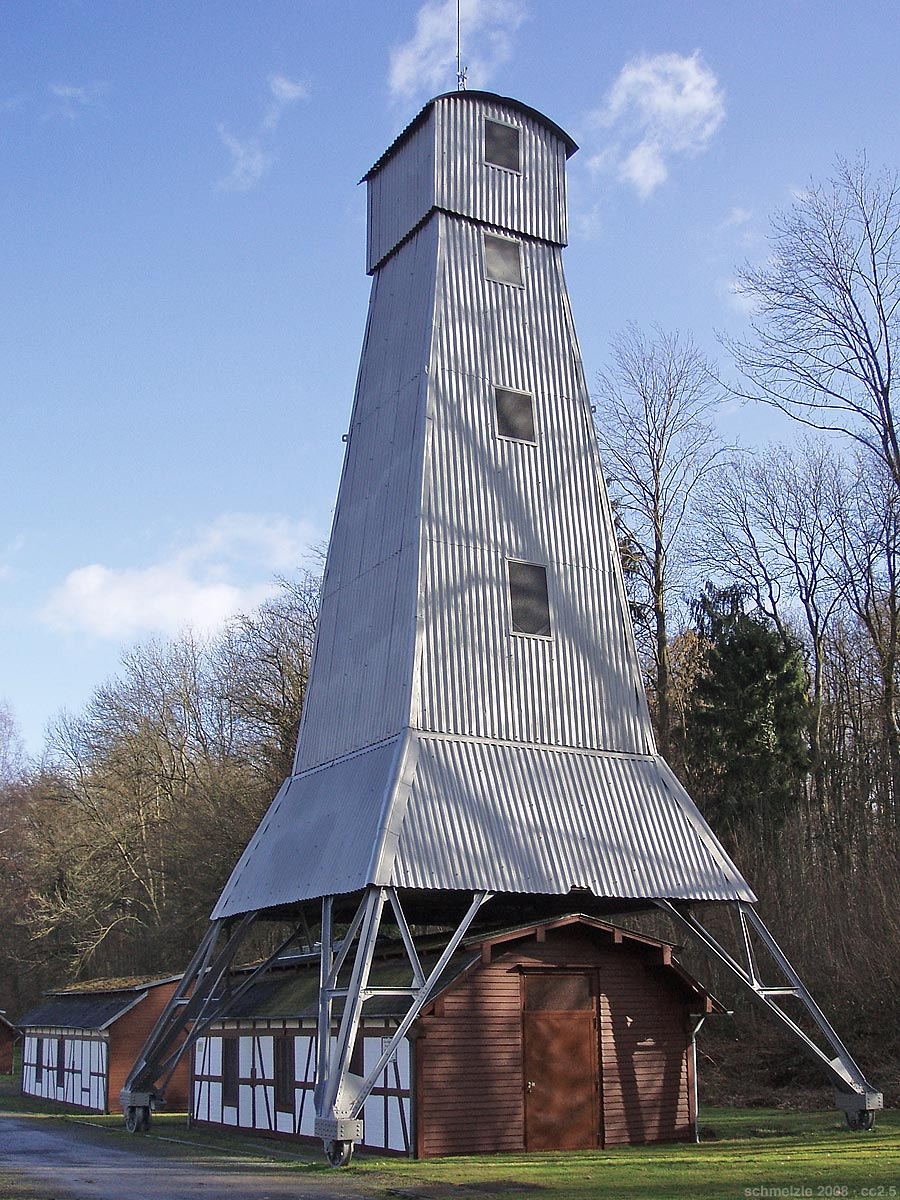
Derrick

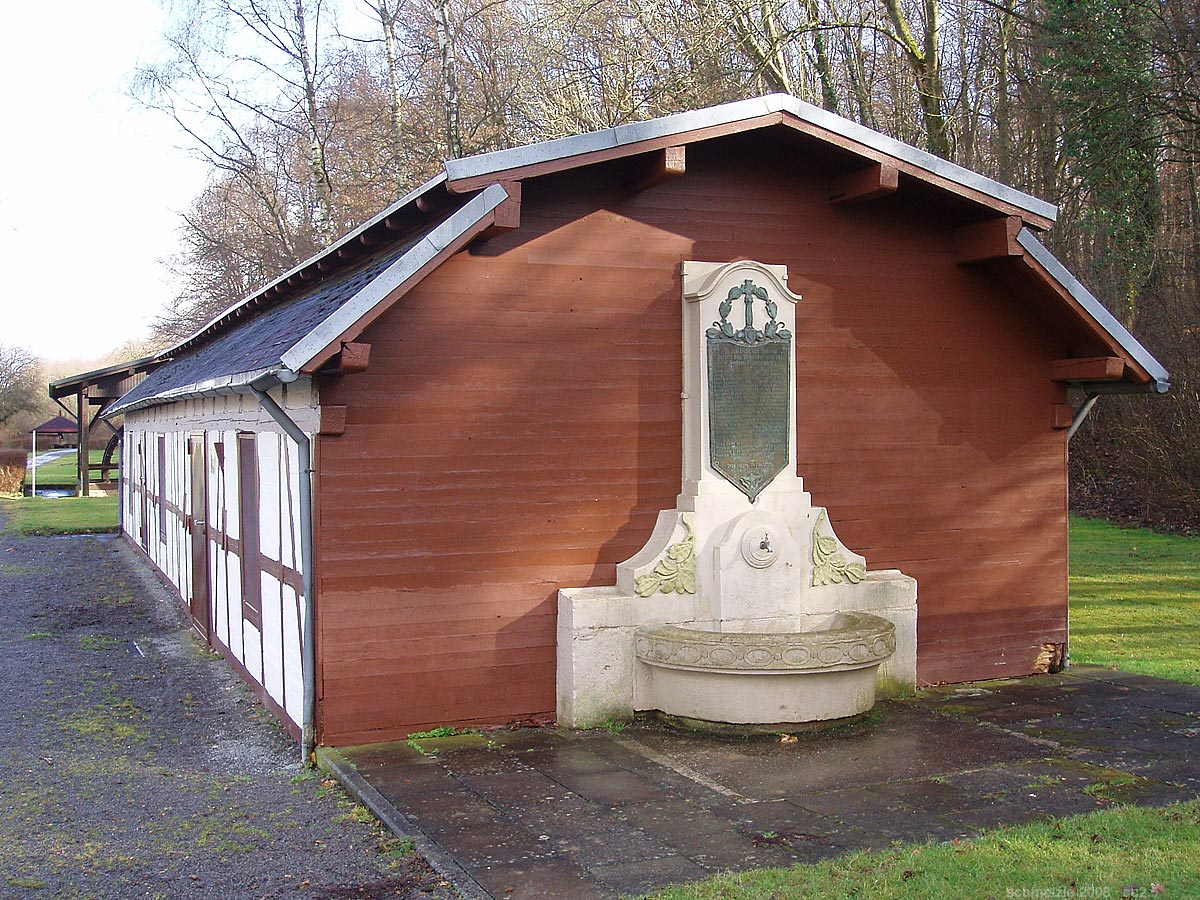
Honour monument

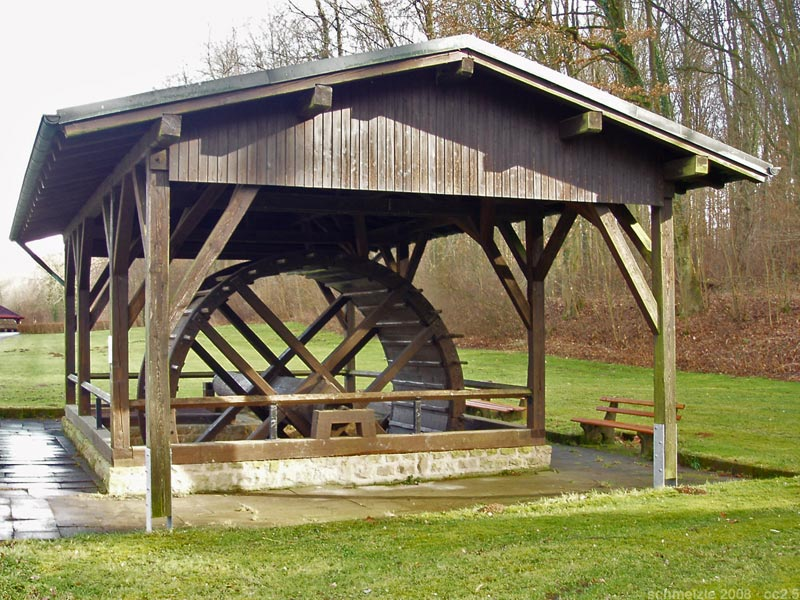
Tretrad

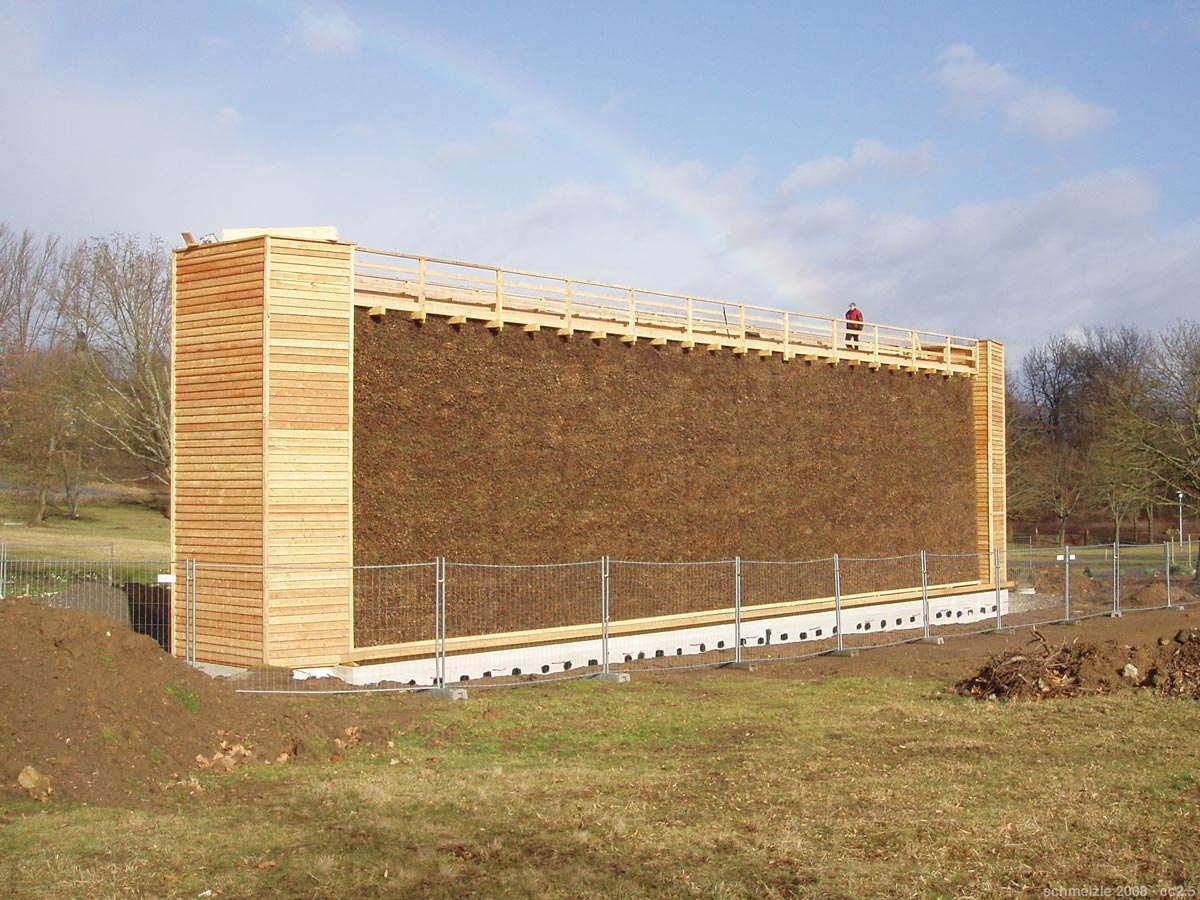
Graduation tower

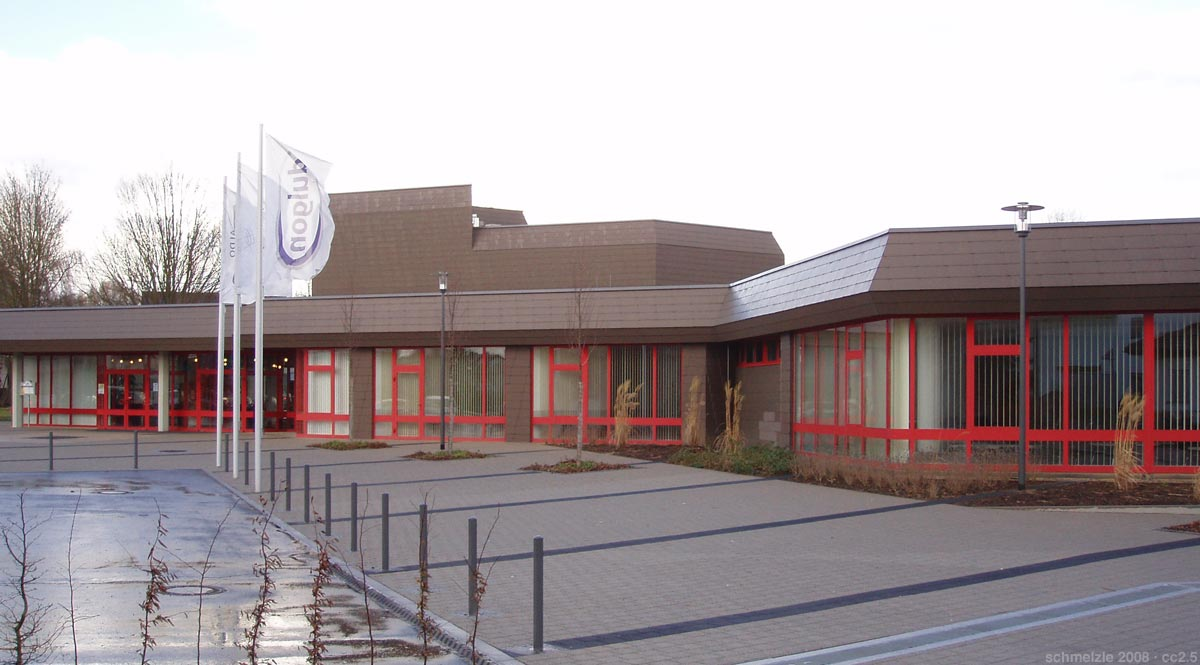
Neues Kurhaus

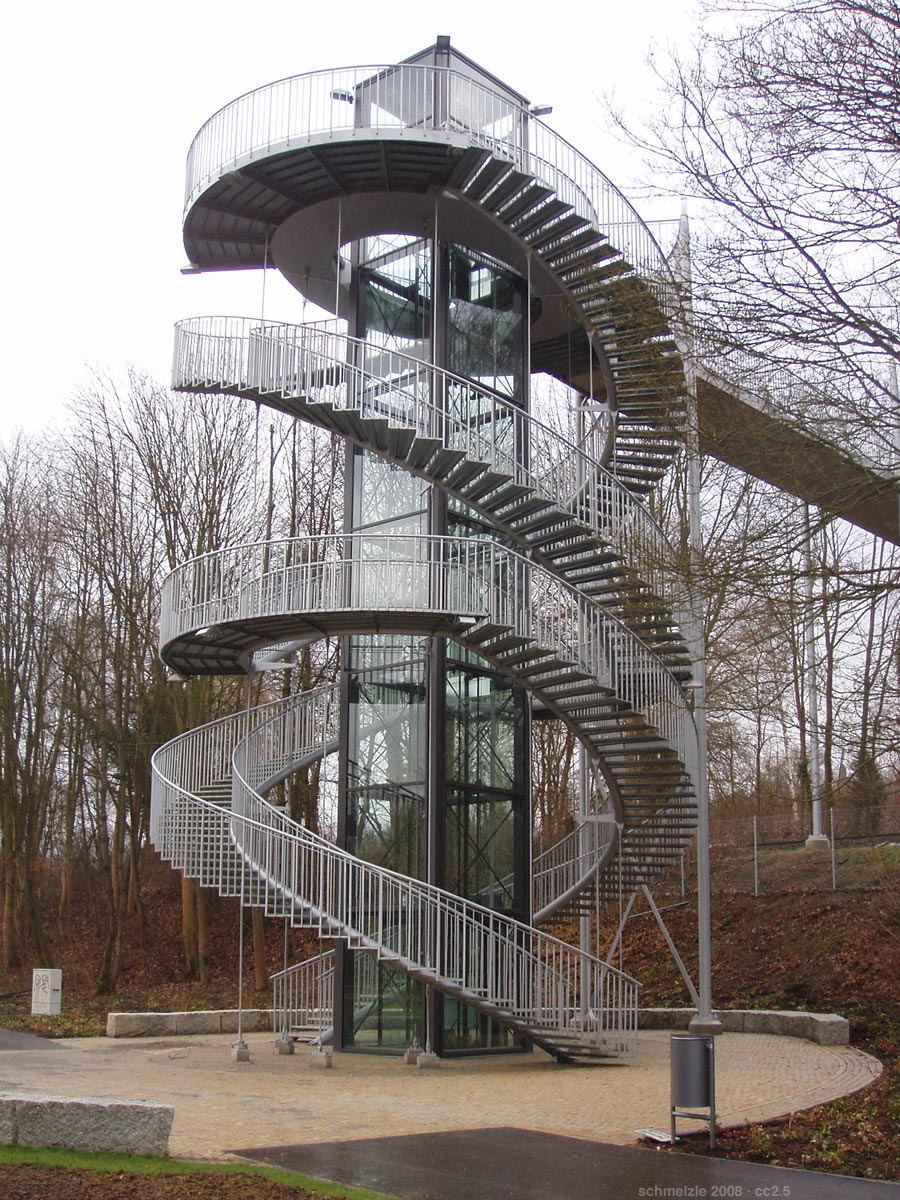
Tower in the spa park

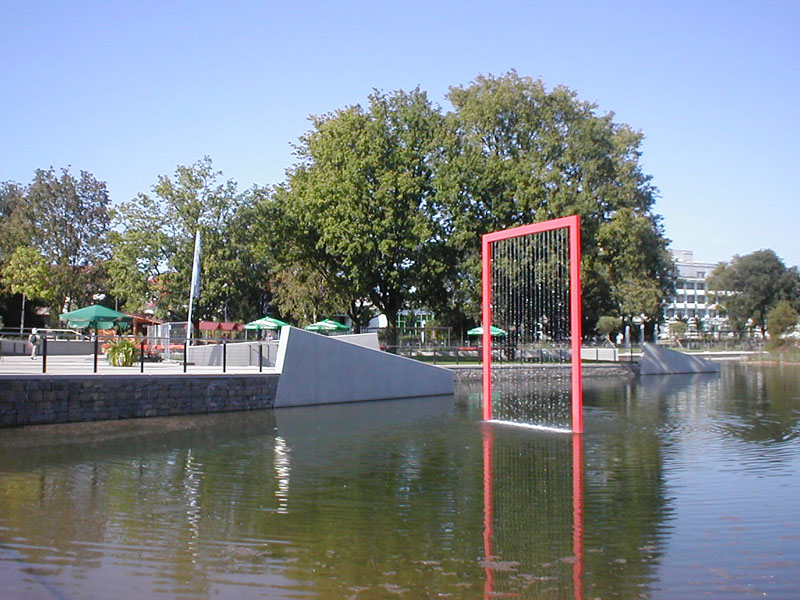
Lake nearby

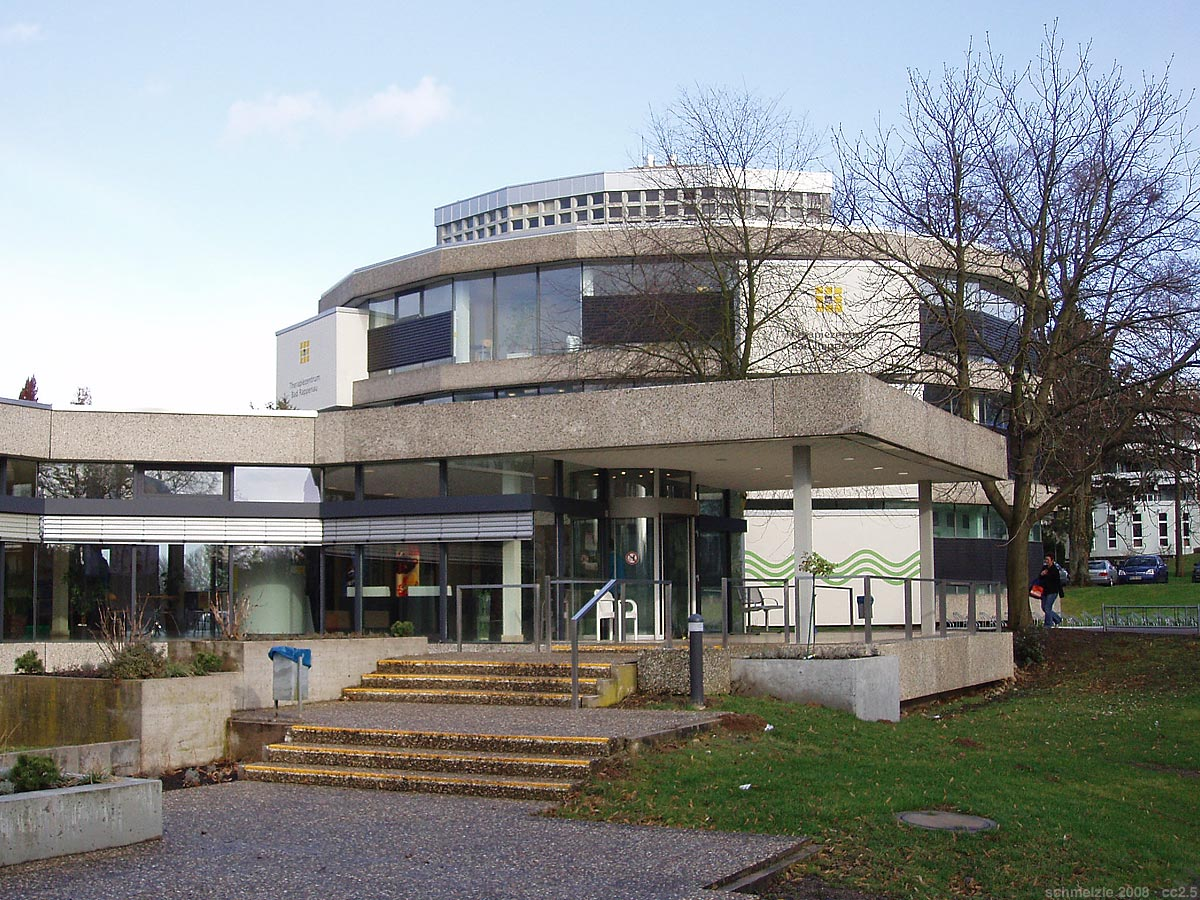
Kurmittelhaus

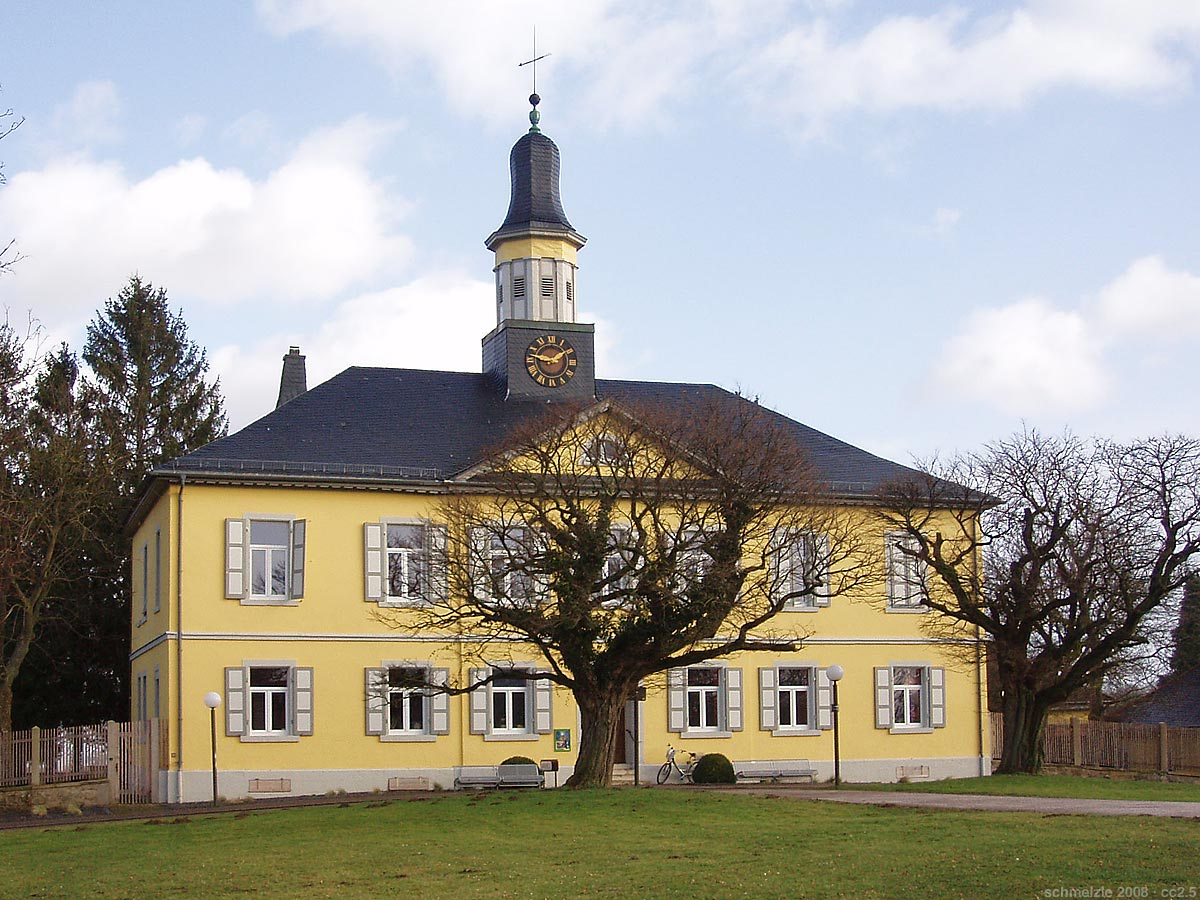
Salt-works building

=== Regular events ===
Since 1977 and 1978 there is the Straßenfest respectively Stadtfest; also a spring festival takes place. Since the 1980s and 1990s there are different festivals in other parts of the town, e. g. the Herbstfest and the Schlosshoffest in Grombach, the Fischerfest in Heinsheim, the Schlossfest in Obergimpern, the Kelterfest in Wollenberg and the Martinimarkt in Zimmerhof. Also there is the lightning festival taking more than 10,000 visitors to Bad Rappenau and having big success. An open-air festival also takes place.

== Economy and infrastructure ==
=== Traffic ===
Bad Rappenau has a direct motorway point along the A 6 (Mannheim–Heilbronn). There is also the Bundesstraße B 39.

Bad Rappenau station is situated at the Elsenz Valley Railway running from Bad Friedrichshall to Heidelberg. Public transport is managed by Heilbronner Hohenloher Haller Nahverkehr.

=== Local businesses ===
Some of the biggest businesses are:

- Modehaus Bauer GmbH, clothing store.
- Kulimare Italian Restaurant.
- Mondi Bad Rappenau GmbH, producer of packaging
- ZIMA Apparate GmbH, producer of filter instruments
- Stahl Plast Kunststoffe GmbH & Co.
- Losberger Intertent GmbH, building constructor
- EOS KSI Inkasso Deutschland GmbH, demand and credit management
- Kraichgau-Klinik Bad Rappenau GmbH & Co.KG, rehabilitation centre of oncology
- Vulpius Klinik GmbH, orthopaedic hospital
- Kurklinik Bad Rappenau GmbH, management and business of hospitals
- Häffner Bräu, brewery and restaurant
- "Vesalius Klinik GmbH" psychosomatic hospital.

=== Media ===
The Kraichgau Stimme, part of the Heilbronner Stimme and the paper Bad Rappenauer Bote / Eppinger Nachrichten, part of the Rhein-Neckar-Zeitung) inform about happenings in Bad Rappenau.

=== Public institutions ===
In Bad Rappenau there is a notary's office.

=== Education ===
Bad Rappenau has a Realschule (Wilhelm-Hauff-Realschule), a Förderschule (Albert-Schweitzer-Schule), a Hauptschule with Werkrealschule and a Grundschule each in Bonfeld, Fürfeld, Grombach, Heinsheim, Obergimpern, Zimmerhof and a further one (Theodor-Heuss-Schule) responsible for Babstadt and Treschklingen. The urban library has more than 20,000 media at its disposal.

== Notable people ==
- Carl Egler (1896–1982), in Karlsruhe, German sculptor
- Eberhard von Gemmingen (born 1936), head of the editorial office of Vatican Radio
