= Carl Egler =

German sculptor

- Born: 3 July 1896; Bad Rappenau, German Empire
- Died: 16 August 1982 (aged 86); Karlsruhe, West Germany
- Occupation: Sculptor

Carl Egler (3 July 1896 – 16 August 1982) was a German sculptor. His work was part of the sculpture event in the art competition at the 1928 Summer Olympics.
