= Petr Stanislav =

Czech weightlifter

Personal information
- Full name: Petr Stanislav
- Born: 8 June 1973 (age 53) Kraslice, Czechoslovakia
- Height: 160 cm (5 ft 3 in)
- Weight: 68.38 kg (150.8 lb)

Sport
- Country: Czech Republic
- Sport: Weightlifting
- Weight class: 69 kg
- Team: National team
- Updated on 3 October 2016

Petr Stanislav (born 8 June 1973 in Kraslice) is a Czech male weightlifter, competing in the 69 kg category and representing Czech Republic at international competitions. He participated at the 1996 Summer Olympics in the 59 kg event. He competed at world championships, most recently at the 1998 World Weightlifting Championships.

== Major results ==
Year	Venue	Weight	Snatch (kg)				Clean & Jerk (kg)				Total	Rank
Year	Venue	Weight	1	2	3	Rank	1	2	3	Rank	Total	Rank
Summer Olympics
1996	Atlanta, United States	59 kg				—N/a				—N/a		10
World Championships
1998	Lahti, Finland	69 kg	120	~~125~~	~~125~~	28	145	~~150~~	~~150~~	24	265	24
