= Weightlifting at the 2018 Summer Youth Olympics – Boys' 56 kg =

Event at the 2018 Youth Olympics

Boys' 56 kg at the III Summer Youth Olympic Games
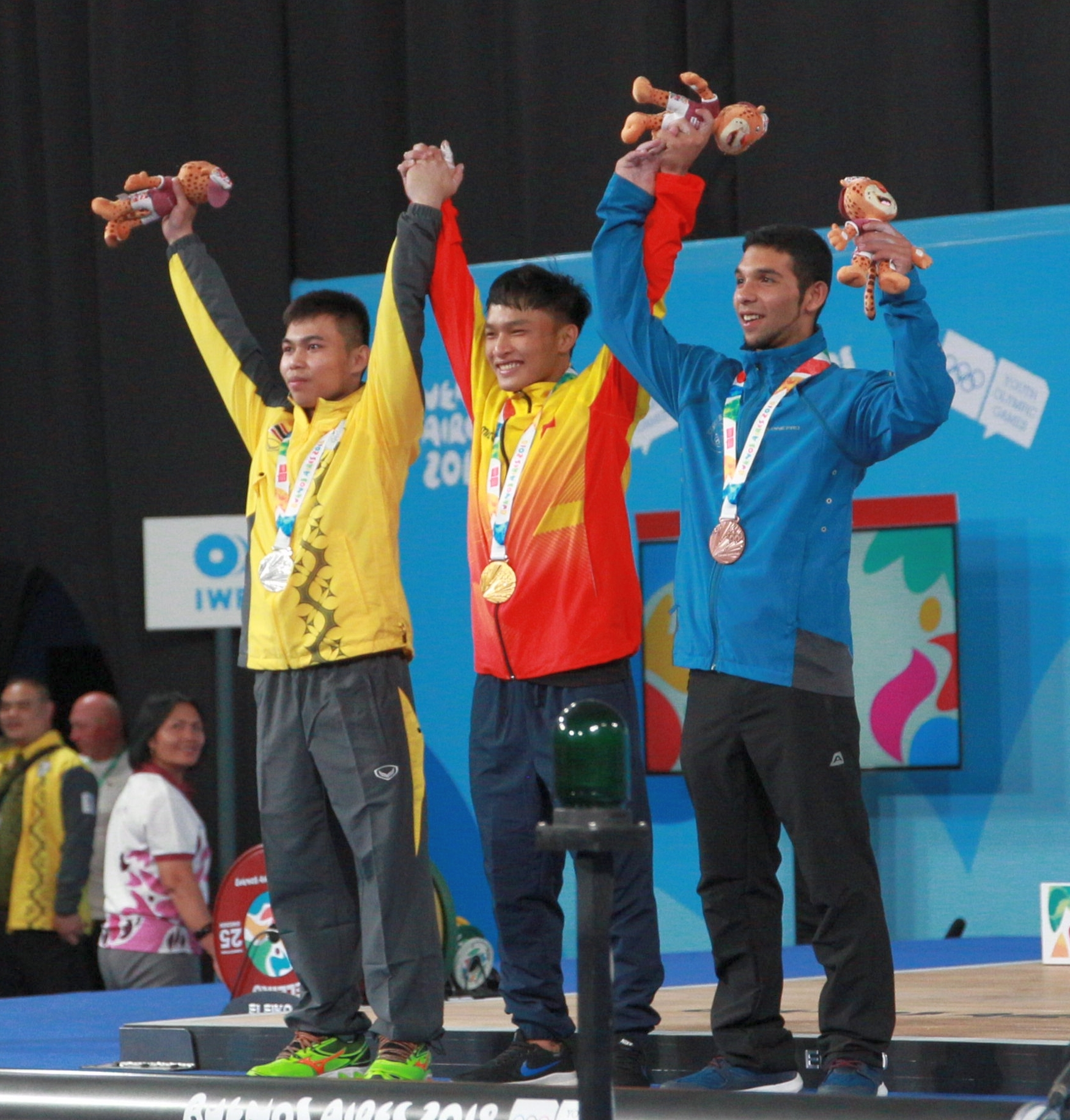
- Victory ceremony
- Venue: Parque Polideportivo Roca
- Dates: 7 October
- Competitors: 6 from 6 nations

Medalists
1st place, gold medalist(s)		Ngô Sơn Đỉnh; Vietnam
2nd place, silver medalist(s)		Natthawat Chomchuen; Thailand
3rd place, bronze medalist(s)		František Polák; Czech Republic

These are the results for the boys' 56 kg event at the 2018 Summer Youth Olympics.

== Results ==
Rank	Name	Nation	Body Weight	Snatch (kg)				Clean & Jerk (kg)				Total (kg)
Rank	Name	Nation	Body Weight	1	2	3	Res	1	2	3	Res	Total (kg)
1st place, gold medalist(s)	Ngô Sơn Đỉnh	Vietnam		108	111	114	114	138	142	148	148	262
2nd place, silver medalist(s)	Natthawat Chomchuen	Thailand		103	106	109	109	130	~~148~~	~~154~~	130	239
3rd place, bronze medalist(s)	František Polák	Czech Republic		92	97	104	104	116	121	129	129	233
4	Jonatan Martín Leyes	Argentina		90	95	~~100~~	95	110	115	120	120	215
5	José David Perales García	Spain		~~88~~	~~88~~	88	88	105	110	~~115~~	110	198
6	Miharintsoa Jose Rajaona	Madagascar		85	~~90~~	~~90~~	85	105	110	~~115~~	110	195

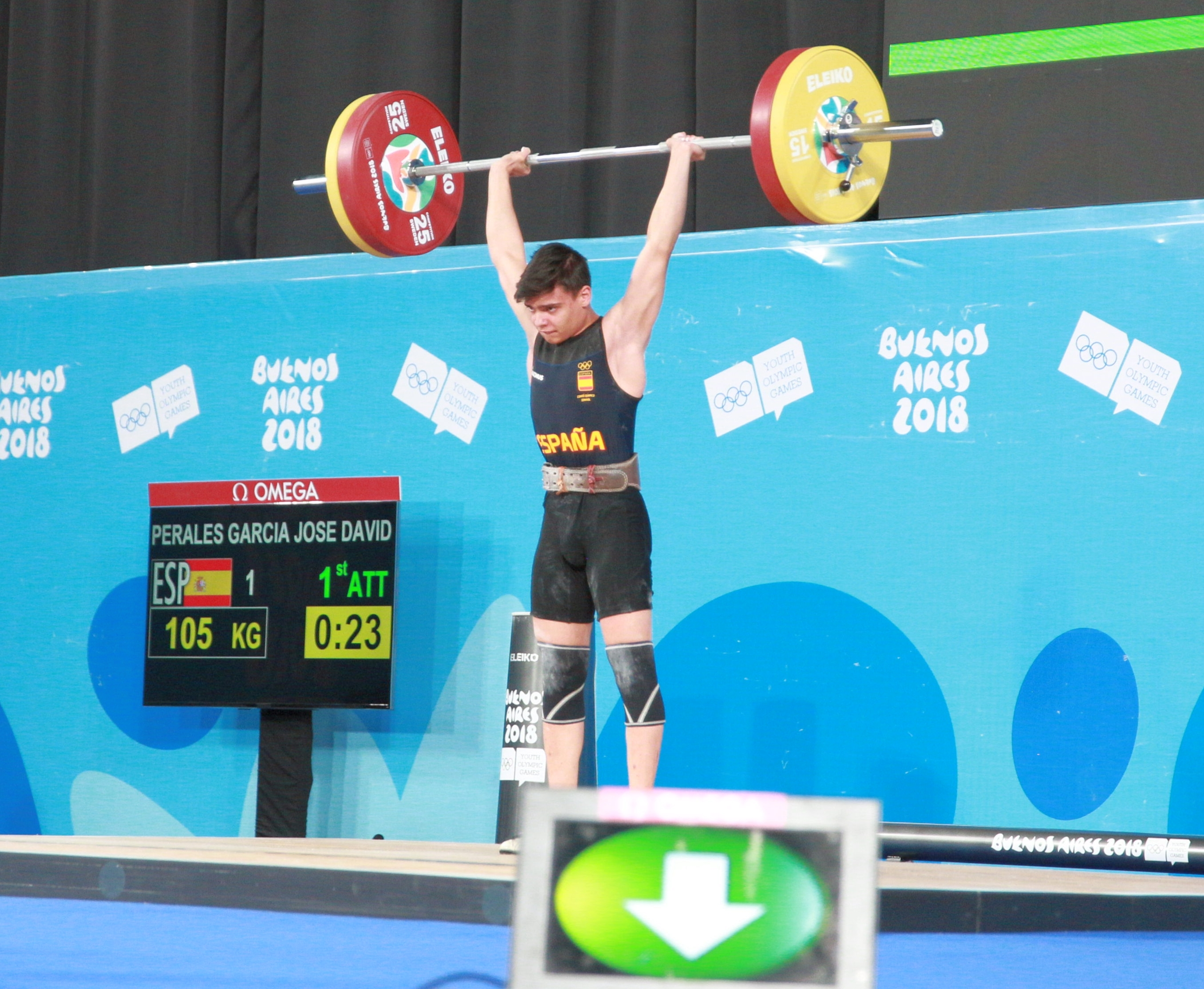
José David Perales García, Clean & Jerk attempt 1

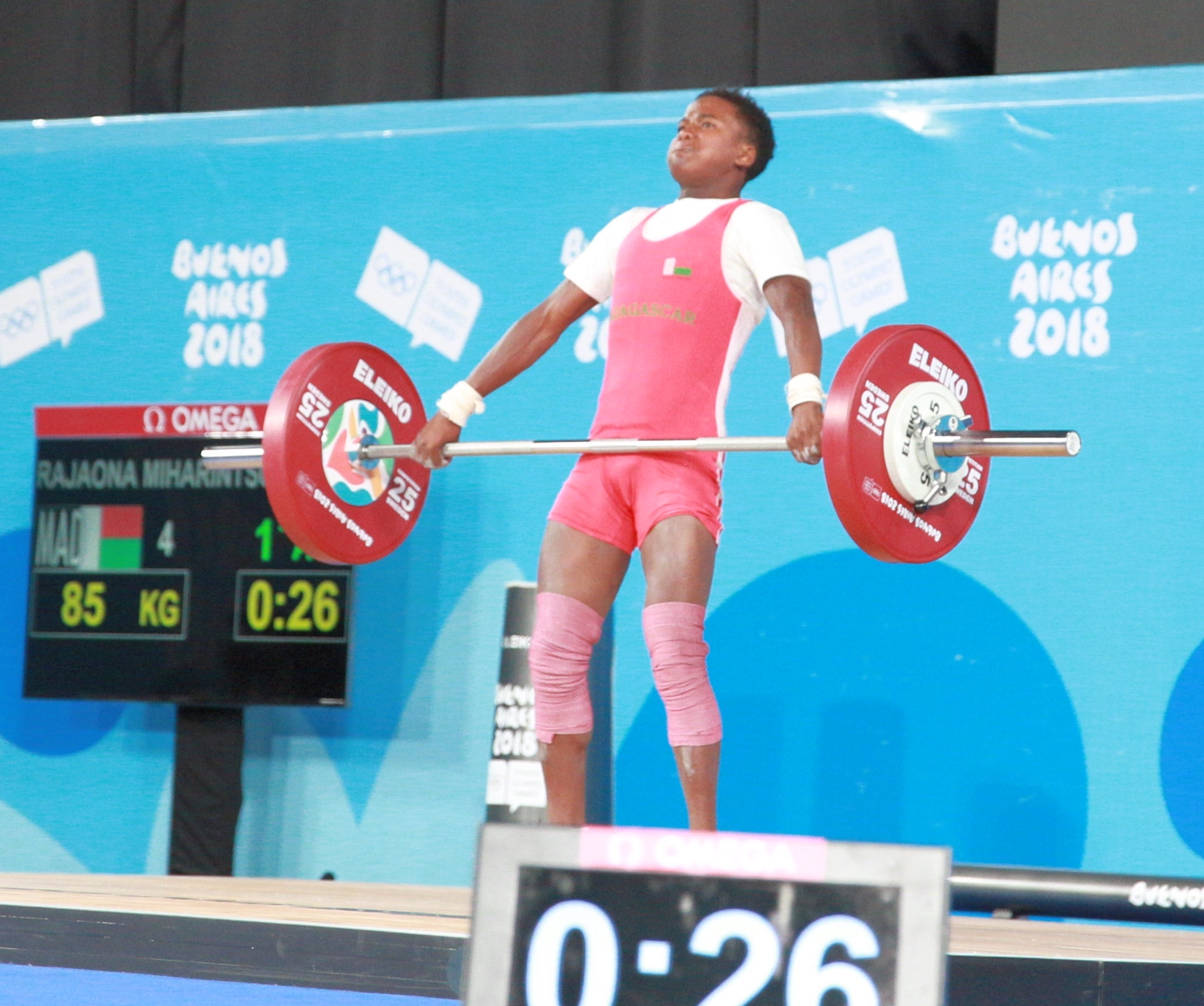
Miharintsoa Jose Rajaona, Snatch attempt 1

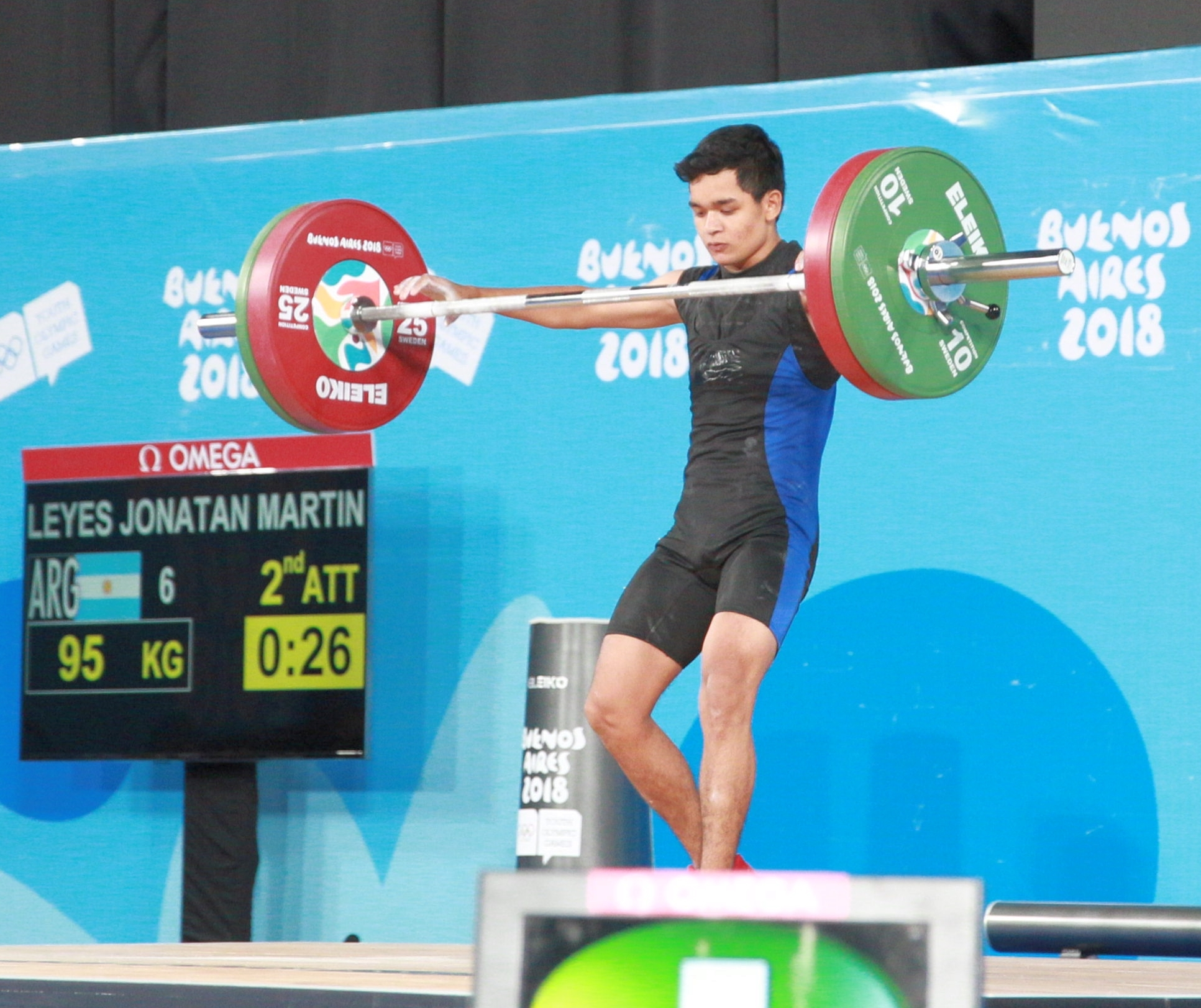
Jonatan Martin Leyes, Snatch attempt 2

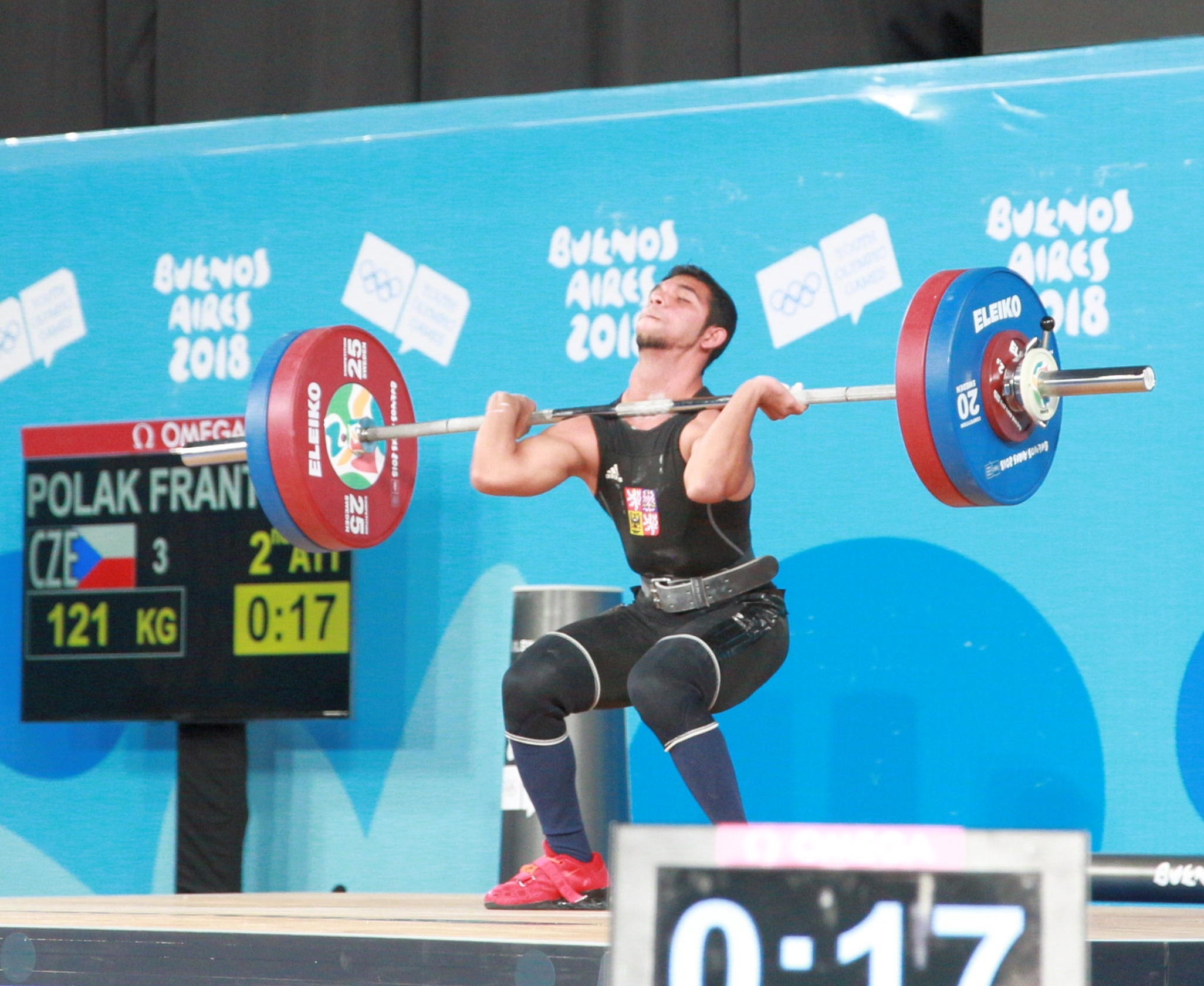
František Polák, Clean & Jerk attempt 2

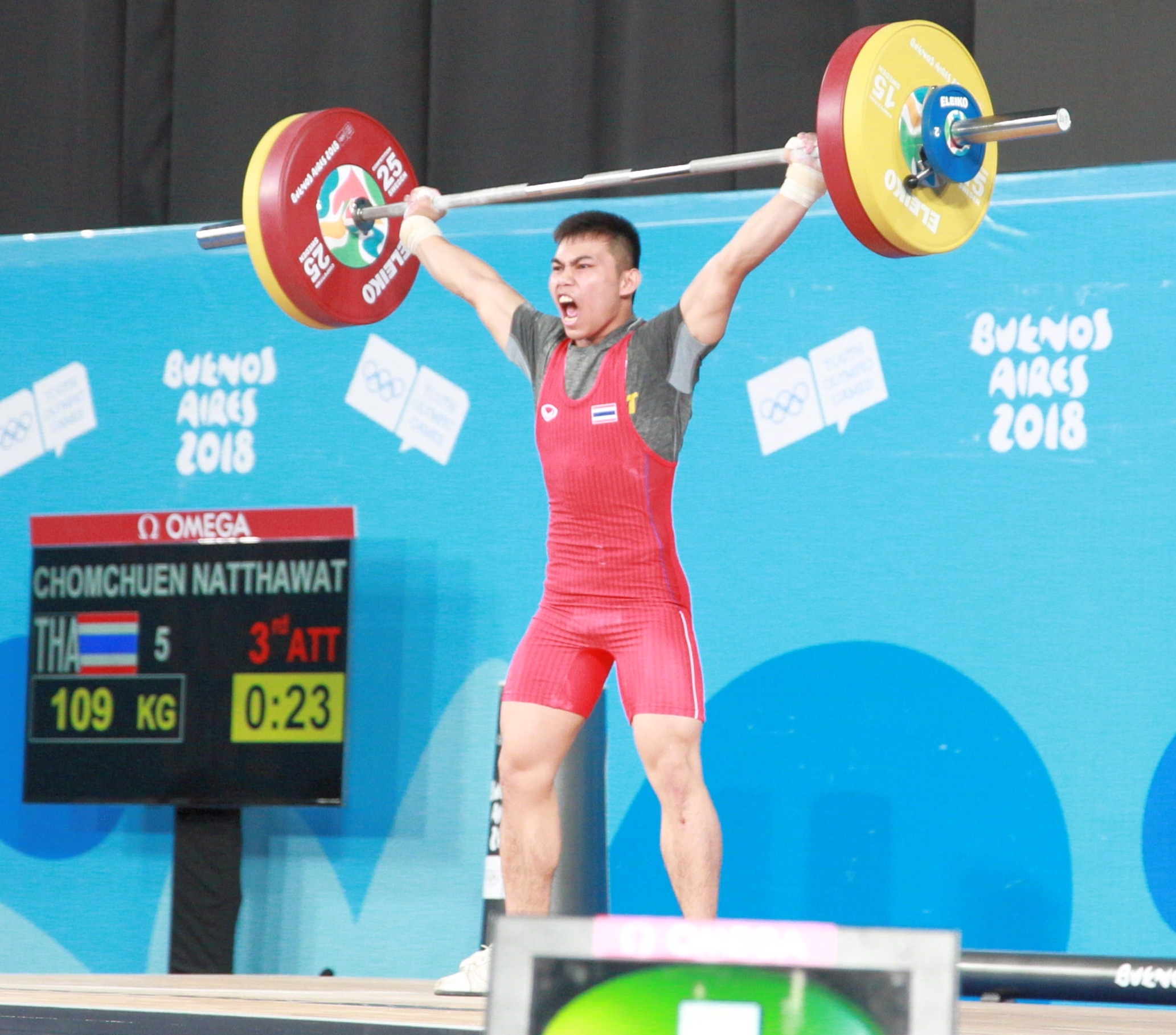
Natthawat Chomchuen, Snatch attempt 3

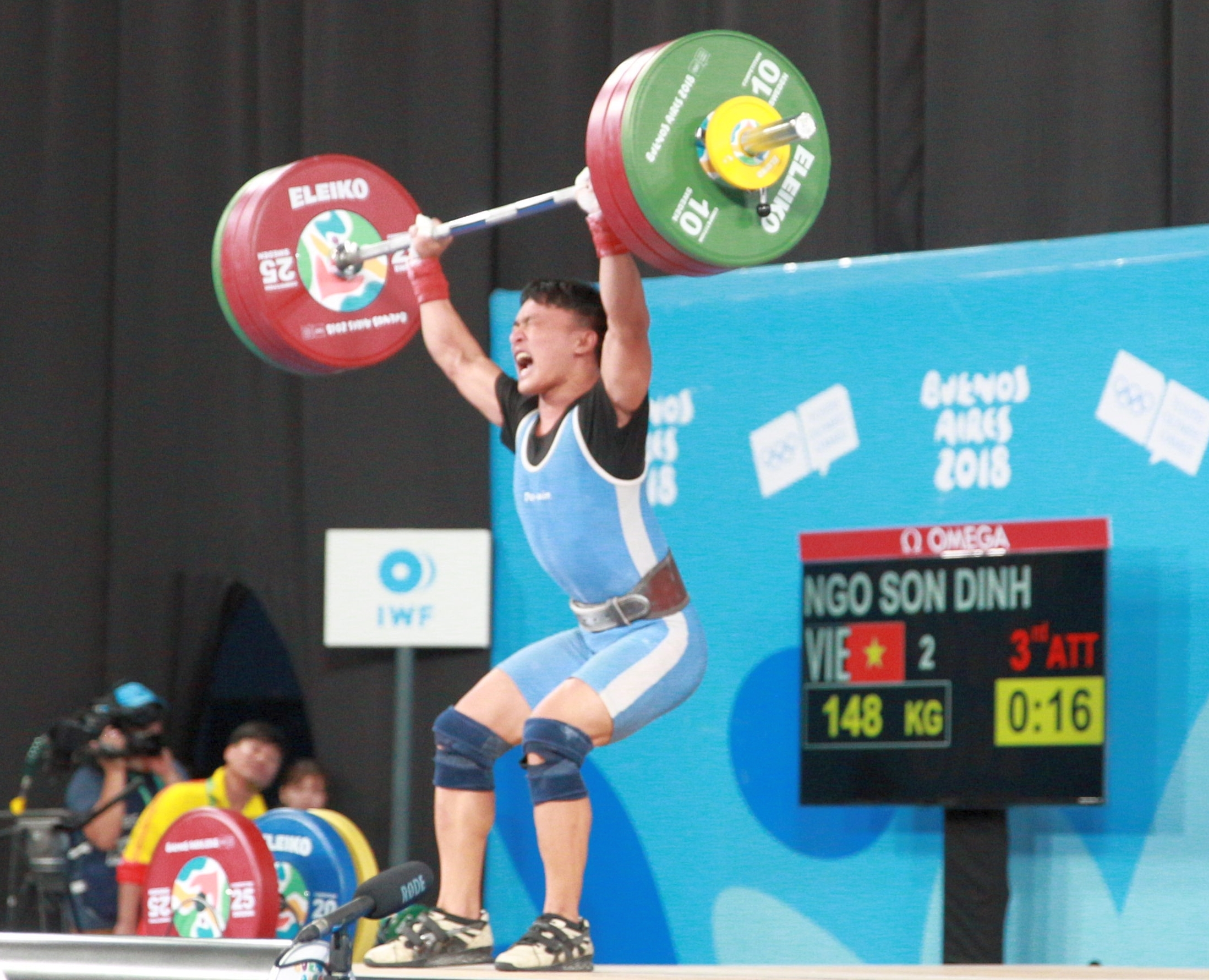
Ngô Sơn Đỉnh, Clean & Jerk attempt 3
