= Eberhard von Gemmingen =

German Jesuit Eberhard von Gemmingen (born 4 April 1936) is the head of the editorial board of the German Vatican Radio.

== Life ==
When he was three years old, his parents settled in Württemberg. His mother had been educated by jesuits, while his father later died in the Second World War in 1945 on the Eastern front.

After graduating from high school, he joined the Jesuit Order. He completed his Jesuit studies in philosophy at did academic work in several universities. He was ordained in 1968 by Cardinal Julius Döpfner in Munich . His first major media assignment as a Jesuit was with the German state broadcast network ZDF As of 1982 he was working at Radio Vatican. He knew Pope Benedict XVI

As editorial head of Vatican Radio, he worked on the election of Cardinal Joseph Ratzinger as Pope Benedict XVI. He had previously studied Tübingen . It was not surprising that he is one of the first exclusive interview with the new Pope. This was also the first personal interview with a pope.

His editorial focuses include the planning of the overall program, particularly the radio academies, radio retreats, Sunday reflections and the weekly commentaries.

Von Gemmingen has advocated dissident views within the Church. For instance, he suggested that women be named to the rank of Cardinal. He also criticized Pope Benedict's handling of the Richard Williamson affair and suggested that the pontiff might resign.

After a heart attack in 2007, he worked with German visitors of Vatican Radio and later withdrew in Germany.

== Awards ==
- 2002 Federal Cross of Merit First Class the Federal Republic of Germany
