= Tomáš Matykiewicz =

Czech weightlifter

Personal information
- Nationality: Czech
- Born: 4 December 1982 (age 43) Český Těšín, Czechoslovakia

Sport
- Sport: Weightlifting

Tomáš Matykiewicz (born 4 December 1982) is a Czech weightlifter. He competed in the men's heavyweight event at the 2004 Summer Olympics. He tested positive for doping after the 2007 World Weightlifting Championships and was banned from competing for two years.
