= Turkey at the 2010 World Women's Boxing Championship =

Boxing competitions

TUR

Turkey (listed as TUR) participated in the 6th AIBA Women’s World Boxing Championship held between September 9–18, 2010 at Garfield Sobers Gymnasium in Bridgetown, Barbados.

With ten women boxers participating, Turkey garnered one gold medal only.

== Participants ==
Weight	Name	City	Club
48 kg	Binnur Sakal	Rize	Rize Gençlikspor
51 kg	Sümeyra Yazıcı	Istanbul	Fenerbahçe S.K.
54 kg	Ayşe Taş	Istanbul	Fenerbahçe S.K.
57 kg	Nagehan Gül	İzmit	Kocaeli BBS
60 kg	Meryem Zeybek Aslan	Van	
64 kg	Gülsüm Tatar	İstanbul	Fenerbahçe S.K.
69 kg	Nurcan Çarkçı Göksel	Istanbul	Kıraç BS
75 kg	Elif Güneri	Karabük	
81 kg	Selma Yağcı	Denizli	Denizli BS
+81 kg	Şemsi Yaralı	Ankara	TSE

== Medals ==
2008 World Women’s Boxing Championship
Weight	Name	Gold	Silver	Bronze
64 kg	Gülsüm Tatar	1		

== Results by event ==
Weight	Red	Score	Blue
48 kg
1st round	Steluta Duta (Romania)	17 - 8	(Turkey) Binnur Sakal
51 kg
1st round	Sümeyra Yazıcı (Turkey)	7 - 4	(Philippines) Annie Albania
2nd round	Sümeyra Yazıcı (Turkey)	12 - 8	(India) Laishram Devi
3rd round	Cancan Ren (China)	9 - 4	(Turkey) Sümeyra Yazıcı
54 kg
1st round	Lauren Fisher (United States)	7 - 8	(Turkey) Ayşe Taş
2nd round	Ayşe Taş (Turkey)	8 - 1	(Brazil) Clelia Dacosta
Quarterfinals	Karolina Michalczuk (Poland)	9 - 3	(Turkey) Ayşe Taş
57 kg
1st round	Jamila Jones (Trinidad and Tobago)	3 - 18	(Turkey) Nagehan Gül
2nd round	Nagehan Gül (Turkey)	4 - 14	(North Korea) Kum Ju Yun
60 kg
2nd Round	Anastasia Belyakova (Russia)	11 - 6	(Turkey) Meryem Zeybek Aslan
64 kg
1st round	Gülsüm Tatar (Turkey)	21 - 4	(Republic of Ireland) Allana Murphy
Quarterfinals	Gülsüm Tatar (Turkey)	17 - 10	(Kazakhstan) Saida Khassenova
Semifinals	Klara Svensson (Sweden)	3 - 7	(Turkey) Gülsüm Tatar
Finals	Gülsüm Tatar (Turkey)	13 -1	(Russia) Vera Slugina
69 kg
1st round	Nurcan Çarkçı Göksel (Turkey)	WO	(Panama) Lourdes Borbua
Quarterfinals	Nurcan Çarkçı Göksel (Turkey)	7 - 11	(Netherlands) Marichelle Jong
75 kg
1st round	Elif Güneri (Turkey)	15 - 5	(North Korea) Un Hui Jang
Quarterfinals	Gulzat Musabaeva (Kyrgyzstan)	RSC R1 0:53	(Turkey) Elif Güneri
Semifinals	Elif Güneri (Turkey)	2 - 5	(China) Jinzi Li
81 kg
1st round	Maria Yavorskaya (Russia)	8 - 11	(Turkey) Selma Yağcı
Quarterfinals	Roseli Feitosa (Brazil)	16 - 3	(Turkey) Selma Yağcı
+81 kg
2nd round	Kateryna Kuzhel (Ukraine)	DSQ R4 0:37	(Turkey) Şemsi Yaralı

Legend

- DSQ Disqualified
- R Round
- RSC Referee Stop Contest
- WO Walkover
