= Turkey at the 2008 World Women's Boxing Championship =

Boxing competitions

TUR

Turkey (listed as TUR) participated in the 5th AIBA Women’s World Boxing Championship held between November 22–29, 2008 at Ningbo Sports Center in Ningbo City, China.

With eleven women boxers participating, Turkey won two gold and two bronze medals. It ranked 2nd in the unofficial medal table after China.

== Participants ==
Weight	Name	City	Club
46 kg	Serpil Yassıkaya	Ankara	Ankara BBS
48 kg	Gulseda Başıbütün	Ankara	Fenerbahçe
50 kg	Sümeyra Yazıcı	Istanbul	Fenerbahçe
52 kg	Ayşe Taş	Istanbul	Fenerhahçe
54 kg	Meryem Aslan Zeybek	Van	
57 kg	Nagihan Gül	Kocaeli	Kocaeli BBS
60 kg	Gonca Yılmaz	Ankara	Ankara BBS
63 kg	Gülsüm Tatar	İstanbul	Fenerbahçe
70 kg	Nurcan Çarkçı	İstanbul	Kıraç BS
80 kg	Selma Yağcı	Denizli	Denizli BS
86 kg	Şemsi Yaralı	Ankara	TSE

== Medals ==
2008 World Women’s Boxing Championship
Weight	Name	Gold	Silver	Bronze
63 kg	Gülsüm Tatar	1		
70 kg	Nurcan Çarkçı			1
80 kg	Selma Yağcı			1
86 kg	Şemsi Yaralı	1		
	Total	2	0	2

== Results by event ==
Weight	Red	Score	Blue
46 kg
1st round	Xiao Feng Guan (China)	9 - 0	(Turkey) Serpil Yassıkaya
48 kg
1st round	Gülseda Başıbütün (Turkey)	2 - 5	(North Korea) Jong Hyang Ri
50 kg
1st round	Sümeyra Yazıcı (Turkey)	4 - 10	(North Korea) Hyang Ok Kim
52 kg
1st round	Viktoria Rudenko (Ukraine)	11 - 8	(Turkey) Ayşe Taş
54 kg
1st round	Meryem Aslan Zeybek (Turkey)	2 - 6	(Russia) Liudmila Bondarenko
57 kg
1st round	Zhulduzay Imanbayeva (Kazakhstan)	2 - 11	(Turkey) Nagehan Gül
2nd round	Jamila Jones (Trinidad and Tobago)	7 - 8	(Turkey) Nagehan Gül
Quarterfinals	Jian Qin (China)	10 - 3	(Turkey) Nagehan Gül
60 kg
1st round	Gonca Yılmaz (Turkey)	0 - 12	(Czech Republic) Danusa Dilhofova
63 kg
1st round	Gülsüm Tatar (Turkey)	7 - 5	(Kazakhstan) Saida Khassenova
Quarterfinals	Gülsüm Tatar (Turkey)	6 - 0	(North Korea) Hyon Hwa Ri
Semifinals	Jian Xia Ma (China)	3 - 4	(Turkey) Gülsüm Tatar
Finals	Liubov Lopatina (Russia)	0 -11	(Turkey) Gülsüm Tatar
70 kg
1st round	Rana Abdelhamid (Egypt)	4 - 8	(Turkey) Nurcan Çarkçı
Quarterfinals	Lilya Durnyeva (Ukraine)	6 -10	(Turkey) Nurcan Çarkçı
Semifinals	Arian Fortin (Canada)	16 - 5	(Turkey) Nurcan Çarkçı
80 kg
1st round	Iryna Komar (Ukraine)	3 - 11	(Turkey) Selma Yağcı
Quarterfinals	Anna Gladkikh (Russia)	4 -14	(Turkey) Selma Yağcı
Semifinals	Jie Li Tang (China)	8 - 6	(Turkey) Selma Yağcı
86 kg
1st round	Şemsi Yaralı (Turkey)	10 - 0	(Ukraine) Inna Shevchenko
Semifinals	Şemsi Yaralı (Turkey)	7 - 5	(United States) Tiffanie Nichole Hearn
Finals	Adriana Hosu (Romania)	2 - 7	(Turkey) Şemsi Yaralı
