= 2006 Women's European Union Amateur Boxing Championships =

Boxing competitions

2006 Women's European Union Boxing Championships
- Host city: Sardinia
- Country: Italy
- Nations: 17
- Athletes: 78
- Dates: 6–11 June
- Main venue: Area Teleferica

The 2006 Women's European Union Amateur Boxing Championships were held in the Area Teleferica in Porto Torres, Sardinia, Italy from June 6 to June 11. This was the first edition of this annual competition, and was organised by the European governing body for amateur boxing, EABA.

78 fighters representing 17 federations competed in 13 weight divisions. Turkey was the most successful country with 2 gold, 4 silver and four bronze medals. Italian star Simona Galassi retired from amateur boxing after winning gold in these games.

== Medal winners ==
Event	Gold	Silver	Bronze
46 kg	(Romania) Steluța Duță	(Italy) Valeria Calabrese	(Turkey) Serpil Yassıkaya (Poland) Ewelina Pękalska
48 kg	(Italy) Laura Tosti	(Romania) Camelia Negrea	(Sweden) Jenny Hardings (Hungary) Mónika Csík
50 kg	(Italy) Simona Galassi	(France) Delphine Mancini	(Turkey) Ayse Yavuz (Romania) Lidia Ion
52 kg	(Turkey) Sumeyra Kaya	(Germany) Elena Walendzik	(France) Saliha Ouchen (Italy) Loredana Piazza
54 kg	(Poland) Karolina Michalczuk	(Germany) Natalie Kalinowski	(Romania) Mihaela Cijevschi (Finland) Kati Collander
57 kg	(Switzerland) Dina Burger	(Belgium) Evelyn Coolens	(France) Myriam Dellal (Turkey) Gonca Yılmaz
60 kg	(Turkey) Gülsüm Tatar	(Poland) Anna Kasprzak	(Switzerland) Sandra Brugger (France) Lucie Bertaud
63 kg	(Denmark) Vinni Skovgaard	(England) Amanda Coulson	(Turkey) Süreyya Ağıl (Republic of Ireland) Alanna Murphy
66 kg	(Sweden) Anna Ingman	(Turkey) Nurhayat Hicyakmazer	(Denmark) Yvonne Rasmussen; None awarded
70 kg	(France) Aya Cissoko	(Turkey) Emine Ozkan	None awarded (Italy) Patrizia Pilo
75 kg	(Hungary) Anita Ducza	(Turkey) Hatice Olgundeniz	(Poland) Anna Środowska; None awarded
80 kg	(Poland) Beata Małek	(Germany) Ulrike Bruckner	None awarded
86 kg	(Hungary) Mária Kovács	(Turkey) Şemsi Yaralı	(Romania) Adriana Hosu (Poland) Paulina Szmidt

== Medal count table ==
2006 Women's European Union Amateur Boxing Championship
Pos	Country	Gold	Silver	Bronze	Total
1	Turkey	2	4	4	10
2	Poland	2	1	3	6
3	Italy	2	1	2	5
4	Hungary	2	0	1	3
5	France	1	1	3	5
5	Romania	1	1	3	5
7	Denmark	1	0	1	2
7	Switzerland	1	0	1	2
7	Sweden	1	0	1	2
10	Germany	0	3	0	3
11	Belgium	0	1	0	1
11	England	0	1	0	1
13	Finland	0	0	1	1
13	Ireland	0	0	1	1
	Total	13	13	21	
