= Turkey at the 2005 World Women's Boxing Championship =

Boxing competitions

Turkey (listed as TUR) participated in the 3rd World Women's Boxing Championship held between September 25 and October 2, 2005 in Podolsk, Russia.

With thirteen women boxers participating, Turkey garnered five medals, four silver and one bronze. It ranked 9th in the unofficial medal table.

== Participants ==
- 46 kg - Derya Aktop, Ankara (TSE)
- 48 kg - Gülseda Başıbütün, Ankara
- 50 kg - Hasibe Erkoç, Ankara (TSE)
- 52 kg - Sümeyra Kaya, Istanbul (Fenerbahçe)
- 54 kg - Seda Duygu Aygün
- 57 kg - Nagehan Gül, Kocaeli
- 60 kg - Gülsüm Tatar, Istanbul (Fenerbahçe)
- 63 kg - Elif Islak
- 66 kg - Yeliz Yeşil, Ordu
- 70 kg - Nurcan Çarkçı, Istanbul
- 75 kg - Emine Özkan
- 80 kg - Selma Yağcı, Denizli
- 86 kg - Şemsi Yaralı, Ankara (TSE)

== Medals ==
2006 World Women's Boxing Championship
Weight	Name	Gold	Silver	Bronze
52 kg	Sümeyra Kaya		1	
60 kg	Gülsüm Tatar		1	
70 kg	Nurcan Çarkçı			1
80 kg	Selma Yağcı		1	
86 kg	Şemsi Yaralı		1	
	Total		4	1

== Results by event ==
46 kg
1st round	Derya Aktop (Turkey)	Walkover	(United States) Chantel Cordova
Quarterfinals	Gretchen Abaniel (Philippines)	33 - 28	(Turkey) Derya Aktop
48 kg
1st round	Gülseda Başıbütün (Turkey)	23 - 16	(Ukraine) Svetlana Korkishko
Quarterfinals	Camilia Negrea (Romania)	19 - 16	(Turkey) Gülseda Başıbütün
50 kg
1st round	Hasibe Özer (Turkey)	17 - 12	(France) Virginie Nave
Quarterfinals	Simona Galassi (Italy)	13 - 10	(Turkey) Hasibe Özer
52 kg
1st round	Sümeyra Kaya (Turkey)	32 - 16	(India) Meena Kumari
Quarterfinals	Sümeyra Kaya (Turkey)	30 - 15	(North Korea) Hye Song Kim
Semifinals	Sümeyra Kaya (Turkey)	24 - 16	(Ukraine) Victoria Rudenko
Finals	Sofia Ochigava (Russia)	23 - 8	(Turkey) Sümeyra Kaya
54 kg
1st round	Kyang Ok Pak (North Korea)	24 - 14	(Turkey) Seda Duygu Aygün
57 kg
1st round	Nagehan Gül (Turkey)	RSCO-2	(Ukraine) Alexandra Sidorenko
Quarterfinals	Sandra Bizier (Canada)	20 - 17	(Turkey) Nagehan Gül
60 kg
1st round	Gülsüm Tatar (Turkey)	24 - 11	(Egypt) Hanan Hussen
Quarterfinals	Gülsüm Tatar (Turkey)	RSC-I	(United States) Ashley Barnett
Semifinals	Gülsüm Tatar (Turkey)	42 - 26	(Philippines) Martinez Mitchel
Finals	Tatyana Chalaya (Russia)	49 - 24	(Turkey) Gülsüm Tatar
63 kg
1st round	Cecilia Brækhus (Norway)	RSCO-1	(Turkey) Elif Islak
66 kg
1st round	Mary Spencer (Canada)	RSCO-1	(Turkey) Yeliz Yeşil
70 kg
Quarterfinals	Nurcan Çarkçı (Turkey)	RSCO-2	(Ukraine) Tatyana Ivanenko
Semifinals	Ariane Brouch-Fortin (Canada)	45 - 41	(Turkey) Nurcan Çarkçı
75 kg
Quarterfinals	Anita Ducza (Hungary)	31 - 14	(Turkey) Emine Özkan
80 kg
Quarterfinals	Selma Yağcı (Turkey)	RSCO-2	(Australia) Rozmarin Simich
Semifinals	Selma Yağcı (Turkey)	48 - 29	(United States) Tyler Lord Wilder
Finals	Galina Ivanova (Russia)	33 - 20	(Turkey) Selma Yağcı
86 kg
Quarterfinals	Şemsi Yaralı (Turkey)	18 - 10	(United States) Tameka Stephens
Semifinals	Şemsi Yaralı (Turkey)	RSCO-1	(India) Juotsana
Finals	Maria Kovacs (Hungary)	RSCO-2	(Turkey) Şemsi Yaralı
