= 2011 Women's European Union Amateur Boxing Championships =

Boxing competitions

2011 Women's European Union Boxing Championships
- Host city: Katowice
- Country: Poland
- Nations: 20
- Athletes: 84
- Dates: 6–11 June
- Main venue: Spodek

The 2011 Women's European Union Amateur Boxing Championships were held in the Spodek stadium in Katowice, Poland from June 6 to June 11. This was the 6th edition of this annual competition organised by the European governing body for amateur boxing, the European Boxing Confederation (EUBC). 84 fighters from 20 federations competed in 10 weight divisions.

Host country Poland were convincing victors in the overall medal table, with Turkey and England each winning two golds. Ireland's Katie Taylor won her fourth straight gold in the 60 kg division.

== Medal winners ==
Event	Gold	Silver	Bronze
48 kg	(Turkey) Meltem Akar	(Poland) Patrycja Bednarek	(France) Lydia Boussaida (Germany) Sarah Bormann
51 kg	(England) Nicola Adams	(Poland) Karolina Michalczuk	(Italy) Valeria Calabrese (Hungary) Katalin Ancsin
54 kg	(Turkey) Ayşe Taş	(Poland) Sandra Drabik	(France) Delphine Mancini (Hungary) Csilla Nemedi
57 kg	(Poland) Sandra Kruk	(Bulgaria) Svetlana Staneva	(Finland) Tiina Hahl (France) Malva Hammadouche
60 kg	(Republic of Ireland) Katie Taylor	(Poland) Karolina Graczyk	(England) Chantelle Cameron (Finland) Mira Potkonen
64 kg	(England) Natasha Jonas	(Poland) Oliwia Łuczak	(France) Laetitia Chevalier (Belgium) Oshin Derieuw
69 kg	(Poland) Katarzyna Furmaniak	(Netherlands) Marichelle de Jong	(Switzerland) Jennifer Corti (Republic of Ireland) Louise Traynor
75 kg	(Poland) Lidia Fidura	(Netherlands) Nouchka Fontijn	(Turkey) Elif Guneri (Hungary) Mária Kovács
81 kg	(Hungary) Tímea Nagy	(Poland) Sylwia Kusiak	(Republic of Ireland) Lauragh O'Neill; None awarded
+81 kg	(Poland) Anna Słowik	(Turkey) Şennur Demir	(Hungary) Lilla Sandor (Croatia) Danijela Vernic

== Medal count table ==
2011 Women's European Union Amateur Boxing Championships
Pos	Country	Gold	Silver	Bronze	Total
1	Poland	4	6	0	10
2	Turkey	2	1	1	4
3	England	2	0	1	3
4	Hungary	1	0	4	5
5	Ireland	1	0	2	3
6	Netherlands	0	2	0	2
7	Bulgaria	0	1	0	1
8	France	0	0	4	4
9	Finland	0	0	2	2
10	Belgium	0	0	1	1
10	Croatia	0	0	1	1
10	Germany	0	0	1	1
10	Italy	0	0	1	1
10	Switzerland	0	0	1	1
	Total	10	10	19	
