= 2009 Women's European Amateur Boxing Championships =

Boxing competitions

2009 Women's European Boxing Championships
- Host city: Mykolaiv
- Country: Ukraine
- Dates: 15–20 September

The 7th Women's European Amateur Boxing Championships were held in Mykolaiv, Ukraine from September 15 to 20, 2009. This edition of the recurring competition was organised by the European governing body for amateur boxing, EUBC. 113 fighters representing 26 federations competed in 11 weight classes, the limits of which had changed since the previous edition of the championships.

Russia topped the medals table (as they had done in the six previous editions of these championships), although host country Ukraine won more medals in total including 5 bronzes. Featherweight (57kg) victor Sofia Ochigava was voted Best Boxer of the tournament.

== Medal table ==
* Host nation (Ukraine)

| Rank | Nation | Gold | Silver | Bronze | Total |
|---|---|---|---|---|---|
| 1 | Russia | 4 | 1 | 2 | 7 |
| 2 | Ukraine* | 1 | 3 | 5 | 9 |
| 3 | Turkey | 1 | 3 | 2 | 6 |
| 4 | Sweden | 1 | 2 | 1 | 4 |
| 5 | Poland | 1 | 1 | 0 | 2 |
| 6 | Romania | 1 | 0 | 3 | 4 |
| 7 | Ireland | 1 | 0 | 0 | 1 |
| 7 | Norway | 1 | 0 | 0 | 1 |
| 9 | France | 0 | 1 | 2 | 3 |
| 10 | Hungary | 0 | 0 | 3 | 3 |
| 11 | Bulgaria | 0 | 0 | 2 | 2 |
| 12 | Germany | 0 | 0 | 1 | 1 |
| 12 | Italy | 0 | 0 | 1 | 1 |
| Totals (13 entries) | | 11 | 11 | 22 | 44 |

== Medal winners ==
| Event | Gold | Silver | Bronze |
|---|---|---|---|
| Pinweight (46kg) | (Russia) Svetlana Gnevanova | (Sweden) Natalie Lungo | (Romania) Steluța Duță (Ukraine) Oksana Shtakun |
| Light flyweight (48kg) | (Sweden) Jenny Hardingz | (Russia) Elena Savelyeva | (Romania) Lidia Ion (Hungary) Mónika Csík |
| Flyweight (51kg) | (Ukraine) Tetyana Kob | (Sweden) Shipra Nilsson | (France) Virginie Nave (Turkey) Sümeyra Kaya-Yazıcı |
| Bantamweight (54kg) | (Poland) Karolina Michalczuk | (Ukraine) Ivanna Krupenia | (Sweden) Helena Falk (Russia) Viktoria Usachenko |
| Featherweight (57kg) | (Russia) Sofia Ochigava | (Ukraine) Yulia Tsiplakova | (Italy) Marzia Davide (Turkey) Nagehan Gül |
| Lightweight (60kg) | (Republic of Ireland) Katie Taylor | (Turkey) Meryem Zeybek Aslan | (Bulgaria) Denitsa Eliseyeva (Ukraine) Olexandra Sidorenko |
| Light welterweight (64kg) | (Turkey) Gülsüm Tatar | (France) Farida el-Hadrati | (Russia) Vera Slugina (Ukraine) Yana Zavyalova |
| Welterweight (69kg) | (Norway) Lotte Lien | (Poland) Katarzyna Furmaniak | (France) Gihade Lagmiri (Ukraine) Tatiana Ivaschenko |
| Middleweight (75kg) | (Russia) Irina Sinetskaya | (Ukraine) Liliya Durnyeva | (Hungary) Anita Ducza (Germany) Ulrike Brueckner |
| Light heavyweight (81kg) | (Romania) Luminita Turcin | (Turkey) Selma Yağcı | (Hungary) Mária Kovács (Bulgaria) Desislava Lazarova |
| Heavyweight (+81kg) | (Russia) Nadezhda Torlopova | (Turkey) Şemsi Yaralı | (Romania) Raluca Chis (Ukraine) Inna Shevchenko |
