= 2008 Women's European Union Amateur Boxing Championships =

Boxing competitions

Coordinates: 53°23′5″N 2°55′52.4″W

2008 Women's European Union Boxing Championships
- Host city: Liverpool
- Country: England
- Nations: 17
- Athletes: 80
- Dates: 4–8 August
- Main venue: Greenback Sports Academy

The 2008 Women's European Union Amateur Boxing Championships were held in the Greenbank Sports Academy in Liverpool, England from August 4 to 8. This was the 3rd edition of this annual competition, and was organised by the European governing body for amateur boxing, EABA.

80 fighters representing 17 federations competed in 13 weight divisions. Turkey returned to top spot on the medals table with 4 gold and 4 bronze medals. Host country England won her first gold medals in these competitions, as did Ireland in the person of 60 kg World Champion Katie Taylor.

== Medal winners ==
Event	Gold	Silver	Bronze
46 kg	(Romania) Steluța Duță	(Sweden) Natalie Lungo	(Turkey) Serpil Yassıkaya (Italy) Carmela Chiacchio
48 kg	(France) Sarah Ourahmoune	(Romania) Lidia Ion	(Sweden) Jenny Hardingz (Turkey) Gülseda Başıbütün
50 kg	(Turkey) Sümeyra Kaya-Yazıcı	(France) Virginie Nave	(England) Hannah Beharry (Republic of Ireland) Debbie Rogers
52 kg	(France) Saliha Ouchen	(England) Sharon Holford	(Germany) Elena Walendzik (Turkey) Emek Yılmaz
54 kg	(Poland) Karolina Michalczuk	(Italy) Giacoma Cordio	(France) Lorna Weaver (Germany) Pinar Yilmaz
57 kg	(England) Lucy Abel	(Poland) Karolina Graczyk	(Greece) Athina Melefaki (Turkey) Nagehan Gul
60 kg	(Republic of Ireland) Katie Taylor	(France) Cindy Orain	(Poland) Sandra Kruk (England) Anastasia Cousins
63 kg	(Turkey) Gülsüm Tatar	(England) Natasha Jonas	(Poland) Kinga Siwa (Romania) Larisa Rosu
66 kg	(France) Farida el-Hadrati	(England) Amanda Coulson	(Denmark) Gry Espersen (Norway) Lotte Lien
70 kg	(England) Lesley Sackey	(France) Gihade Lagmiri	(Italy) Patrizia Pilo (Croatia) Nikolina Orlović
75 kg	(Romania) Luminita Turcin	(England) Lisa Perryman	None awarded None awarded
80 kg	(Turkey) Selma Yağcı	(Romania) Fetti Paraschiva	(Germany) Ulrike Brueckner (Poland) Beata Leśnik
86 kg	(Turkey) Şemsi Yaralı	(Poland) Sylwia Kusiak	(Romania) Adriana Hosu (Scotland) Sarah Alderman

== Medal count table ==
2008 Women's European Union Amateur Boxing Championship
Pos	Country	Gold	Silver	Bronze	Total
1	Turkey	4	0	4	8
2	France	3	3	1	7
3	England	2	4	2	8
4	Romania	2	2	2	6
5	Poland	1	2	3	6
6	Ireland	1	0	1	2
7	Italy	0	1	2	3
8	Sweden	0	1	1	2
9	Germany	0	0	3	3
10	Croatia	0	0	1	1
10	Denmark	0	0	1	1
10	Greece	0	0	1	1
10	Norway	0	0	1	1
10	Scotland	0	0	1	1
	Total	13	13	24	
