= 2007 Women's European Union Amateur Boxing Championships =

Boxing competitions

2007 Women's European Union Boxing Championships
- Host city: Lille
- Country: France
- Nations: 80
- Athletes: 76
- Dates: 4–8 December
- Main venue: Palais St Sauveurs

The 2007 Women's European Union Amateur Boxing Championships were held in the Palais St Sauveurs in Lille, France, from December 4 to 8. This was the 2nd edition of this annual competition, and was organised by the European governing body for amateur boxing, EABA.

76 fighters representing 15 federations competed in 13 weight divisions. France, the host country, was the most successful with 3 gold, 1 silver and 4 bronze medals.

== Medal winners ==
Event	Gold	Silver	Bronze
46 kg	(Romania) Steluța Duță	(Italy) Carmela Chiacchio	(France) Sara Hamraoui (Poland) Kornela Majewska
48 kg	(France) Sarah Ourahmoune	(Romania) Lidia Ion	(Turkey) Derya Aktop (Italy) Silvia La Notte
50 kg	(Bulgaria) Stoyka Petrova	(Romania) Diana Timofte	(Germany) Evelyn Grubich (Finland) Mari Hyvonen
52 kg	(France) Saliha Ouchen	(Turkey) Ayşe Taş	(Sweden) Shipra Nilsson (Romania) Andrea Gheju
54 kg	(Italy) Giacoma Cordio	(France) Lorna Weaver	(Belgium) Joany Looijer (Germany) Pinar Yilmaz
57 kg	(Turkey) Nagehan Gul	(Poland) Karolina Graczyk	(Bulgaria) Svetlana Kamenova (Lithuania) Goda Dailydaitė
60 kg	(Turkey) Gulsum Tatar	(Belgium) Evelyn Coolens	(Poland) Kinga Siwa (England) Anastasia Cousins
63 kg	(France) Farida el-Hadrati	(England) Amanda Coulson	(Poland) Ewa Brodnicka (Belgium) Ann Verheyen
66 kg	(Sweden) Ronja Holgersson	(England) Natasha Jonas	(Hungary) Csilla Csejtei (France) Amelie Blary
70 kg	(Romania) Luminita Turcin	(Poland) Sylwia Kimla	(Italy) Patrizia Pilo (France) Naouel Alioua
75 kg	(Sweden) Anna Laurell	(Hungary) Anita Ducza	(Romania) Gabriela Mitran (France) Alexandra De Hutten
80 kg	(Turkey) Selma Yağcı	(Poland) Karolina Bagnowska	(Romania) Catalina Stanga; None awarded
86 kg	(Hungary) Mária Kovács	(Romania) Adriana Hosu	(Turkey) Semsi Yarali; None awarded

== Medal count table ==
2007 Women's European Union Amateur Boxing Championship
Pos	Country	Gold	Silver	Bronze	Total
1	France	3	1	4	8
2	Turkey	3	1	2	6
3	Romania	2	3	3	8
4	Sweden	2	0	1	3
5	Italy	1	1	2	4
6	Hungary	1	1	1	3
7	Bulgaria	1	0	1	2
8	Poland	0	3	3	6
9	England	0	2	1	3
10	Belgium	0	1	2	3
11	Germany	0	0	2	2
12	Finland	0	0	1	1
12	Lithuania	0	0	1	1
	Total	13	13	24	
