= Sümeyra Kaya =

Turkish boxer

Sümeyra Kaya-Yazıcı
Personal information
- Nationality: Turkish
- Born: Sümeyra Kaya
- Weight: Flyweight
Medal record
Women's Boxing
Representing Turkey
World Championships
Silver medal – second place	2005 Podolsk, Russia	52 kg
European Championships
Bronze medal – third place	2009 Mykolaiv, Ukraine	51 kg
Gold medal – first place	2007 Vejle, Denmark	50 kg
Silver medal – second place	2006 Warsaw, Poland	52 kg
Silver medal – second place	2005 Tønsberg, Norway	52 kg
Silver medal – second place	2004 Riccione, Italy	52 kg
European Union Championships
Silver medal – second place	2010 Keszthely, Hungary	51 kg
Gold medal – first place	2008 Liverpool, England	50 kg
Gold medal – first place	2006 Porto Torres, Italy	52 kg

Sümeyra Kaya-Yazıcı, née Kaya, is a European champion Turkish female boxer competing in the flyweight division. She is a member of the Fenerbahçe Boxing club in Istanbul, Turkey.

She was silver medalist at the 2005 Women's World Amateur Boxing Championships held in Podolsk, Russia. In 2007, she became European champion in Vejle, Denmark. In addition, she holds diverse medals in European and European Union championships.

== Achievements ==
- 2004 Women's European Amateur Boxing Championships Riccione, Italy 52 kg - Silver
- 2005 Women's World Amateur Boxing Championships Podolsk, Russia 52 kg - Silver
- 2005 Women's European Amateur Boxing Championships Tønsberg, Norway 52 kg - Silver
- 2006 Women's European Amateur Boxing Championships Warsaw, Poland 52 kg - Silver
- 2006 Women's European Union Amateur Boxing Championships Porto Torres, Italy 52 kg - Gold
- 2007 Women's European Amateur Boxing Championships Vejle, Denmark 50 kg - Gold
- 2008 Women's European Union Amateur Boxing Championships Liverpool, England 50 kg - Gold
- 2009 Women's European Amateur Boxing Championships Mykolaiv, Ukraine 51 kg - Bronze
- 2010 Women's European Union Amateur Boxing Championships Keszthely, Hungary 51 kg - Silver
