= Meltem =

Meltem is a Turkish given name for females. It derives from the Turkish word for the strong, dry, north winds of the Aegean Sea.

People named Meltem include:

- Meltem Akar (born 1982), Turkish boxer
- Meltem Arıkan (born 1968), Turkish novelist and playwright
- Meltem Cumbul (born 1969), Turkish actress
- Meltem Hocaoğlu (born 1992), Turkish karateka.

== See also ==
- SS Meltem, a Turkish steamship in service 1951-56
