= 2006 Women's European Amateur Boxing Championships =

Boxing competitions

2006 Women's European Boxing Championships
- Host city: Warsaw
- Country: Poland
- Dates: 4–10 September

The 5th Women's European Amateur Boxing Championships were held in Warsaw, Poland from September 4 to 10, 2006. This edition of the recurring competition was organised by the European governing body for amateur boxing, EABA. Competitions took place in 13 weight classes.

Russia topped the medals table, as they had done in the four previous editions of these championships.

== Medal table ==
* Host nation (Poland)

Rank	Nation	Gold	Silver	Bronze	Total
1	Russia	4	4	4	12
2	Turkey	2	1	3	6
3	Poland*	1	2	4	7
4	France	1	1	1	3
4	Hungary	1	1	1	3
6	Romania	1	0	2	3
7	Norway	1	0	1	2
8	Denmark	1	0	0	1
8	Ireland	1	0	0	1
10	Ukraine	0	2	3	5
11	Israel	0	1	0	1
11	Switzerland	0	1	0	1
13	Finland	0	0	2	2
13	Italy	0	0	2	2
13	Sweden	0	0	2	2
16	Czech Republic	0	0	1	1
Totals (16 entries)		13	13	26	52

== Medal winners ==
Event	Gold	Silver	Bronze
Pinweight (46kg)	(Romania) Steluța Duță	(Poland) Ewelina Pękalska	(Italy) Valeria Calabrese (Russia) Svetlana Gnevanova
Light flyweight (48kg)	(Russia) Olesya Gladkova	(Hungary) Mónika Csík	(Sweden) Jenny Hardings (Turkey) Gülseda Başıbütün
Flyweight (50kg)	(Turkey) Hasibe Erkoç	(Russia) Viktoria Usatchenko	(Romania) Lidia Ion (Italy) Valeria Imbrogno
Super flyweight (52kg)	(Turkey) Sümeyra Kaya	(France) Saliha Ouchen	(Finland) Maarit Teuronen (Poland) Jagoda Karge
Bantamweight (54kg)	(Norway) Kari Jensen	(Poland) Karolina Michalczuk	(Ukraine) Ludmila Hrytsay (Russia) Sofia Ochigava
Featherweight (57kg)	(Russia) Elena Karpacheva	(Switzerland) Dina Burger	(Norway) Ingrid Egner (France) Myriam Dellal
Lightweight (60kg)	(Republic of Ireland) Katie Taylor	(Russia) Tatyana Chalaya	(Turkey) Gülsüm Tatar (Poland) Anna Kasprzak
Super lightweight (63kg)	(Denmark) Vinni Skovgaard	(Russia) Yulia Nemtsova	(Ukraine) Saida Gasanova (Poland) Kinga Siwa
Welterweight (66kg)	(France) Aya Cissoko	(Ukraine) Oleksandra Kozlan	(Russia) Irina Poteyeva (Poland) Karolina Koszela
Super welterweight (70kg)	(Russia) Olga Slavinskaya	(Israel) Natalia Ostroumova	(Sweden) Klara Svensson (Czech Republic) Martina Schmoranzová
Middleweight (75kg)	(Russia) Maria Yavorskaya	(Ukraine) Olha Novikova	(Finland) Mia Eteläpelto (Hungary) Anita Ducza
Light heavyweight (80kg)	(Poland) Beata Małek	(Russia) Galina Ivanova	(Ukraine) Irina Komar (Turkey) Selma Yağcı
Heavyweight (86kg)	(Hungary) Mária Kovács	(Turkey) Şemsi Yaralı	(Russia) Albina Vaskyekina (Romania) Adriana Hosu
