= 2011 Women's European Amateur Boxing Championships =

Boxing competitions

2011 Women's European Boxing Championships
- Country: Netherlands
- Dates: 16–23 October
- Main venue: Topsportcentrum Rotterdam

The Women’s European Boxing Championships was hosted and organised by the Dutch Boxing Association in the Netherlands in 2011. The event was held in the ‘Topsportcentrum Rotterdam’ in the Netherlands from 16 to 23 October 2011.

It was the first time in the Dutch Boxing Association’s 100-year history that they hosted such an international event. The tournament was organised in association with the European Boxing Confederation (EUBC).

== Contestants ==
The organisers of the event expected to welcome between 300 and 400 women boxers, competing in 10 different weight classes.

== Medal table ==
* Host nation (Netherlands)

Rank	Nation	Gold	Silver	Bronze	Total
1	Russia	4	2	1	7
2	Turkey	2	0	2	4
3	Ukraine	1	1	5	7
4	England	1	1	2	4
5	Netherlands*	1	1	0	2
6	Ireland	1	0	0	1
7	Poland	0	2	2	4
8	Wales	0	1	1	2
9	Armenia	0	1	0	1
9	France	0	1	0	1
11	Bulgaria	0	0	2	2
12	Croatia	0	0	1	1
12	Czech Republic	0	0	1	1
12	Hungary	0	0	1	1
12	Romania	0	0	1	1
12	Sweden	0	0	1	1
Totals (16 entries)		10	10	20	40

== Medal winners ==
Event	Gold	Silver	Bronze
Light flyweight (48kg)	(Russia) Svetlana Gnevanova	(Wales) Lynsey Holdaway	(Romania) Steluța Duță (Ukraine) Natalia Knyaz
Flyweight (51kg)	(England) Nicola Adams	(France) Sarah Ourahmoune	(Poland) Karolina Michalczuk (Bulgaria) Stoyka Petrova
Bantamweight (54kg)	(Russia) Elena Saveleva	(Poland) Sandra Drabik	(Ukraine) Ivanna Krupenia (Turkey) Ayşe Taş
Featherweight (57kg)	(Ukraine) Natalia Biryuk	(England) Lisa Whiteside	(Turkey) Nagehan Gül (Russia) Viktoria Gurkovich
Lightweight (60kg)	(Republic of Ireland) Katie Taylor	(Russia) Sofia Ochigava	(Bulgaria) Denitsa Eliseyeva (Sweden) Helena Falk
Light welterweight (64kg)	(Turkey) Gülsüm Tatar	(Armenia) Armine Sinabian	(England) Natasha Jonas (Czech Republic) Martina Schmoranzová
Welterweight (69kg)	(Netherlands) Marichelle De Jong	(Ukraine) Maria Badulina	(Poland) Katarzyna Furmaniak (Wales) Lauren Price
Middleweight (75kg)	(Russia) Nadezhda Torlopova	(Netherlands) Nouchka Fontijn	(Ukraine) Liliya Durnyeva (England) Savannah Marshall
Light heavyweight (81kg)	(Russia) Svetlana Kosova	(Poland) Sylwia Kusiak	(Hungary) Tímea Nagy (Ukraine) Inna Shevchenko
Heavyweight (+81kg)	(Turkey) Şemsi Yaralı	(Russia) Irina Sinetskaya	(Ukraine) Katerina Shambir (Croatia) Danijela Vernić
