= 2009 Women's European Union Amateur Boxing Championships =

Boxing competitions

2009 Women's European Union Boxing Championships
- Host city: Pazardzhik
- Country: Bulgaria
- Nations: 12
- Athletes: 62
- Dates: 24–28 June

The 2009 Women's European Union Amateur Boxing Championships were held in Pazardzhik, Bulgaria from June 24 to 28. The event, an annual competition, was the fourth since its conception. It was organised by the European Boxing Confederation (EUBC) and 62 fighters from 12 federations participated in 11 weight divisions.

== Medal winners ==
Event	Gold	Silver	Bronze
46 kg	(France) Floriane Ritner	(Turkey) Serpil Yassıkaya	(Hungary) Ágnes Csapó (Bulgaria) Iva Nikolova
48 kg	(France) Sarah Ourahmoune	(Bulgaria) Stoyka Petrova	(England) Hannah Beharry (Hungary) Mónika Csík
51 kg	(England) Sharon Holford	(Poland) Katarzyna Czuba	(Italy) Simona Lucarno (Bulgaria) Greta Georgieva
54 kg	(Poland) Karolina Michalczuk	(Spain) Irene Gordo	(Hungary) Csilla Nemedi (Italy) Giada Landi
57 kg	(Bulgaria) Svetlana Kamenova	(Italy) Marzia Davide	(Turkey) Gülbahar Genç (England) Lucy Abel
60 kg	(Republic of Ireland) Katie Taylor	(Bulgaria) Denitsa Eliseyeva	(France) Cindy Orain (Poland) Aleksandra Paczka
64 kg	(England) Natasha Jonas	(Hungary) Csilla Csejtei	(Bulgaria) Margarita Cheneva (Greece) Hristina Athanasopoulou
69 kg	(England) Savannah Marshall	(Spain) Tamara García	(Bulgaria) Ralitza Hristova (Turkey) Gülnar Gölçek
75 kg	(France) Erika Guerrier	(Poland) Lidia Fidura	(Bulgaria) Silvia Angelova (Hungary) Anita Ducza
81 kg	(Bulgaria) Desislava Lazarova	(Hungary) Mária Kovács	None awarded (Turkey) Hatice Tokur
+81 kg	(Poland) Sylwia Kusiak	(Bulgaria) Yulia Todorova	None awarded None awarded

== Medal count table ==
2009 Women's European Union Amateur Boxing Championship
Pos	Country	Gold	Silver	Bronze	Total
1	England	3	0	2	5
2	France	3	0	1	4
3	Bulgaria	2	3	5	10
4	Poland	2	2	1	5
5	Ireland	1	0	0	1
6	Hungary	0	2	4	6
7	Spain	0	2	0	2
8	Turkey	0	1	3	4
9	Italy	0	1	2	3
10	Greece	0	0	1	1
	Total	11	11	19	
