= 2007 Women's European Amateur Boxing Championships =

Boxing competitions

2007 Women's European Boxing Championships
- Host city: Vejle
- Country: Denmark
- Dates: 15–20 October

The 6th Women's European Amateur Boxing Championships were held in Vejle, Denmark from October 15 to 20, 2007. This edition of the recurring competition was organised by the European governing body for amateur boxing, EABA. Competitions took place in 13 weight classes.

Russia topped the medals table (as they had done in the five previous editions of these championships) winning 6 gold medals — no other country won more than 1. Nicola Adams became the first English woman to win a medal at a major international championship, while Ireland's Katie Taylor won her division for the third successive time.

== Medal table ==
* Host nation (Denmark)

Rank	Nation	Gold	Silver	Bronze	Total
1	Russia	6	1	3	10
2	Romania	1	2	4	7
3	Sweden	1	2	0	3
4	Ukraine	1	1	4	6
5	Hungary	1	1	1	3
6	Turkey	1	0	5	6
7	France	1	0	3	4
8	Ireland	1	0	0	1
9	Poland	0	2	2	4
10	Bulgaria	0	1	0	1
10	England	0	1	0	1
10	Norway	0	1	0	1
10	Switzerland	0	1	0	1
14	Denmark*	0	0	3	3
15	Netherlands	0	0	1	1
Totals (15 entries)		13	13	26	52

== Medal winners ==
Event	Gold	Silver	Bronze
Pinweight (46kg)	(Romania) Steluța Duță	(Bulgaria) Sevda Asenova	(Denmark) Sofie Molholt (Russia) Svetlana Gnevanova
Light flyweight (48kg)	(Hungary) Mónika Csík	(Romania) Lidia Ion	(Turkey) Derya Aktop (France) Sarah Ourahmoune
Flyweight (50kg)	(Turkey) Sümeyra Kaya	(Poland) Ewelina Pękalska	(Romania) Diana Timofte (France) Virginie Nave
Super flyweight (52kg)	(Ukraine) Viktoria Rudenko	(Sweden) Shipra Nilsson	(Russia) Viktoria Usachenko (Romania) Andrea Gheju
Bantamweight (54kg)	(Russia) Sofia Ochigava	(England) Nicola Adams	(Poland) Karolina Michalczuk (Ukraine) Ludmila Hrytsay
Featherweight (57kg)	(Russia) Elena Gorshkova	(Norway) Ingrid Egner	(Denmark) Malene Nielsen (Turkey) Nagehan Gül
Lightweight (60kg)	(Republic of Ireland) Katie Taylor	(Switzerland) Sandra Brugger	(Ukraine) Yana Zavyalova (Russia) Aizanat Gadzhieva
Super lightweight (63kg)	(France) Lucie Bertaud	(Sweden) Klara Svensson	(Denmark) Yvonne Rasmussen (Turkey) Gülnar Gölçek
Welterweight (66kg)	(Russia) Irina Poteyeva	(Poland) Oliwia Łuczak	(Netherlands) Marichelle de Jong (Hungary) Csilla Csejtei
Super welterweight (70kg)	(Russia) Yulia Nemtsova	(Romania) Luminita Turcin	(Turkey) Nurcan Çarkçı (Poland) Ewa Gawenda
Middleweight (75kg)	(Sweden) Anna Laurell	(Russia) Maria Yavorskaya	(Ukraine) Olha Novikova (France) Alexandra De Hutten
Light heavyweight (80kg)	(Russia) Anna Gladkikh	(Ukraine) Irina Komar	(Turkey) Selma Yağcı (Romania) Catalina Stanga
Heavyweight (86kg)	(Russia) Elena Surkova	(Hungary) Mária Kovács	(Ukraine) Dinara Zhurgunova (Romania) Adriana Hosu
