= Şemsi Yaralı =

Turkish boxer (born 1982)

Personal information
- Nationality: Turkish
- Born: July 20, 1982 (age 43)
- Weight: Heavyweight
Medal record
Women's boxing
World Championships
Gold medal – first place	2008 Ningbo, China	86 kg
Bronze medal – third place	2006 New Delhi, India	86 kg
Silver medal – second place	2005 Podolsk, Russia	86 kg
European Championships
Gold medal – first place	2011 Rotterdam, Netherlands	+81 kg
Silver medal – second place	2009 Mykolaiv, Ukraine	+81 kg
Silver medal – second place	2006 Warsaw, Poland	86 kg
European Union Championships
Bronze medal – third place	2010 Keszthely, Hungary	+81 kg
Gold medal – first place	2008 Liverpool, England	86 kg
Bronze medal – third place	2007 Lille, France	86 kg
Silver medal – second place	2006 Porto Torres, Italy	86 kg

Şemsi Yaralı (July 20, 1982) is a world and European champion Turkish female boxer competing in the heavyweight division. She is a member of the Fenerbahçe SK in Istanbul, Turkey.

She participated at the 3rd World Women's Boxing Championship held between September 25 and October 2, 2005, in Podolsk, Russia, and fought a silver medal in the cruiserweight (86 kg) division. She won a bronze medal in the same division at the 4th World Women's Boxing Championship held between November 18 and 23, 2006, in New Delhi, India. She had won a bronze medal and Hasibe Erkoç won a gold medal for Turkey. At the 5th AIBA Women's World Boxing Championship held between November 22 and 29, 2008, in Ningbo, China, Şemsi Yaralı became a gold medalist in her division (86 kg).

At the 2011 Women's European Amateur Boxing Championships held in Rotterdam, Netherlands, Yaralı became European champion.

== Achievements ==
- 2005 Women's World Amateur Boxing Championships Podolsk, Russia 86 kg - Silver
- 2006 World Women's Boxing Championship New Delhi, India 86 kg - Bronze
- 2006 Women's European Amateur Boxing Championships Warsaw, Poland 86 kg - Silver
- 2006 Women's European Union Amateur Boxing Championships Porto Torres, Italy 86 kg - Silver
- 2007 Women's European Union Amateur Boxing Championships Lille, France 86 kg - Bronze
- 2008 World Women's Boxing Championship Ningbo, China 86 kg - Gold
- 2008 Women's European Union Amateur Boxing Championships Liverpool, England 86 kg - Gold
- 2009 Women's European Amateur Boxing Championships Mykolaiv, Ukraine +81 kg - Silver
- 2010 Women's European Union Amateur Boxing Championships Keszthely, Hungary +81 kg - Bronze
- 2011 Women's European Amateur Boxing Championships Rotterdam, Netherlands +81 kg - Gold
