= Gülsüm Tatar =

Turkish boxer (born 1985)

Gülsüm Şeyma Tatar
Personal information
- Nationality: Turkish
- Born: February 6, 1985 (age 41) Kars, Turkey
- Weight: light welterweight

Boxing career
Medal record
Women's Boxing
Representing Turkey
World Championships
Gold medal – first place	2010 Bridgetown, Barbados	64 kg
Gold medal – first place	2008 Ningbo, China	63 kg
Silver medal – second place	2005 Podolsk, Russia	60 kg
European Championships
Gold medal – first place	2011 Rotterdam, Netherlands	64 kg
Gold medal – first place	2009 Mykolaiv, Ukraine	64 kg
Bronze medal – third place	2006 Waesaw, Poland	60 kg
Bronze medal – third place	2005 Tønsberg, Norway	60 kg
Gold medal – first place	2004 Riccione, Italy	60 kg
European Union Championships
Gold medal – first place	2010 Keszthely, Hungary	64 kg
Gold medal – first place	2008 Liverpool, England	63 kg
Gold medal – first place	2007 Lille, France	60 kg
Gold medal – first place	2006 Porto Torres, Italy	60 kg

Gülsüm Şeyma Tatar (February 6, 1985 in Kars, Turkey) is a world and European champion Turkish female boxer. After having boxed seven years for the sports club Fenerbahçe Boxing in Istanbul, she transferred in 2010 to Birlikspor in Kayseri, Turkey.

She comes from a family of boxers. Her uncle, Kibar Tatar, was a notable Turkish boxer, and her brother was interested in boxing. She was educated in physical education at Fırat University in Elazığ.

She became gold medalist in the lightweight (60 kg) division at the 2004 European Women's Boxing Championships held in Riccione, Italy before she participated at the 3rd World Women's Boxing Championship held between September 25 and October 2, 2005 in Podolsk, Russia, and fought a silver medal. At the 2008 AIBA Women's World Boxing Championship held in Ningbo City, China, Gülsüm Tatar won the gold medal in the light welter (63 kg) division.

She was awarded as the "best boxer" after winning gold in the light welterweight (64 kg) division at the 5th European Union Women's Championships held in Keszthely, Hungary between August 3–8, 2010. Reigning European and World champion Gülsüm Tatar has been officially invited to the 2012 London Olympics, at which women's boxing will debut. She will represent Turkey at the Olympics as the first female boxer.

As of December 1, 2010, Gülsüm Tatar ranked first in her weight category at the "World Women's Rankings" list.

At the 2011 Women's European Amateur Boxing Championships held in Rotterdam, Netherlands, she won her third European gold medal.

India's L Sarita Devi (60 kg) stunned defending champion and world number 2 Gulsum Tatar of Turkey to enter the pre-quarterfinals of the seventh World Women's Boxing Championships in Qinhuangdao, China on May 14, 2012.
