= Sarah Ourahmoune =

French boxer (born 1982)

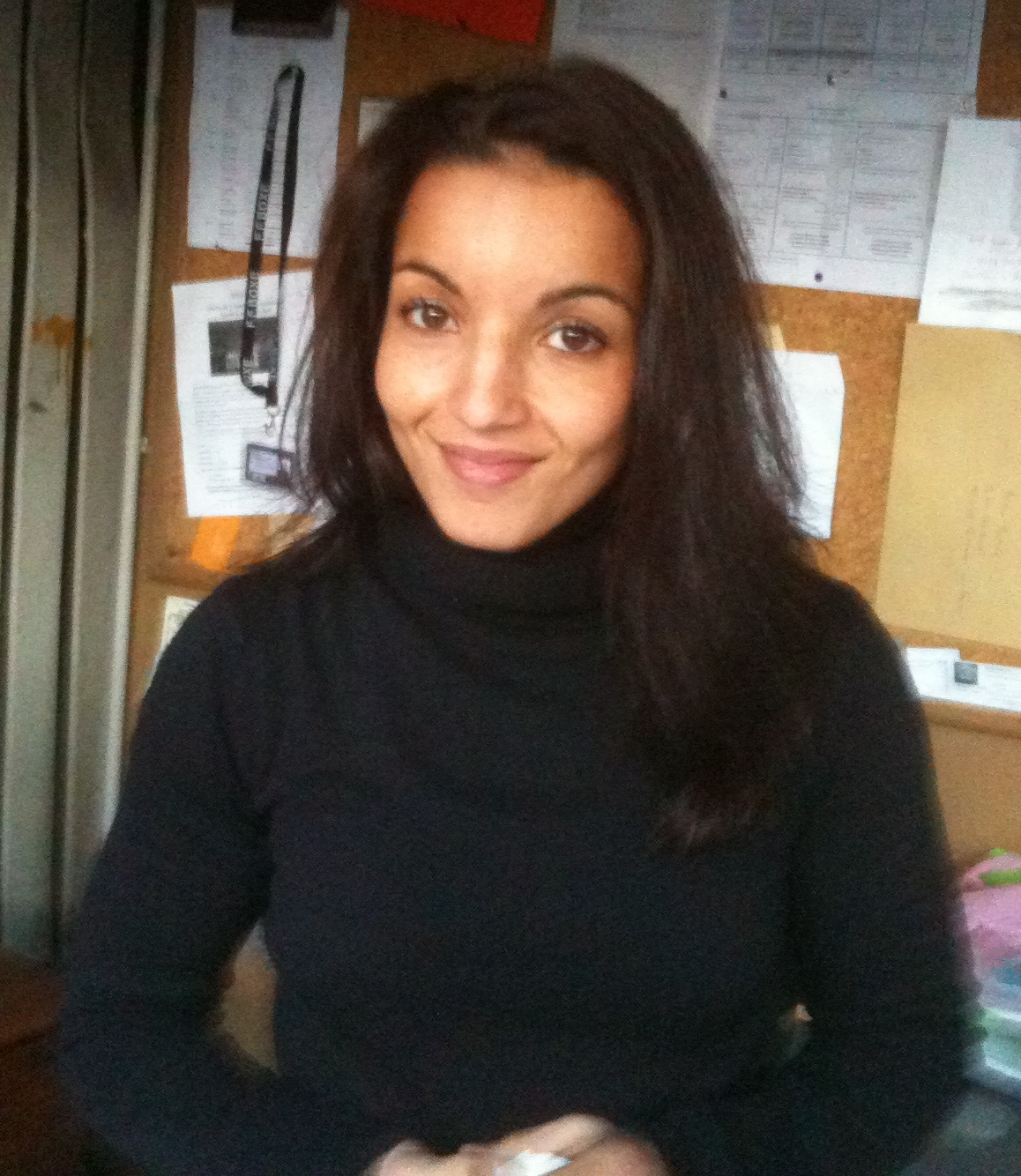
- Ourahmoune in 2011

Personal information
- Nationality: French
- Born: 21 January 1982 (age 44) Sèvres
- Height: 1.58 m (5 ft 2 in)
- Weight: 51 kg (112 lb)

Sport
- Country: France
- Sport: Boxing
- Event: Flyweight
Medal record
Women's amateur boxing
Representing France
Olympic Games
Silver medal – second place	2016 Rio de Janeiro	Flyweight
World Championships
Gold medal – first place	2008 Ningbo	Light flyweight
Bronze medal – third place	2016 Astana	Flyweight
European Championships
Silver medal – second place	2011 Rotterdam	Flyweight
Bronze medal – third place	2007 Vejle	Light flyweight
European Union Championships
Gold medal – first place	2007 Lille	Light flyweight
Gold medal – first place	2008 Liverpool	Light flyweight
Gold medal – first place	2009 Pazardzhik	Light flyweight

Sarah Ourahmoune (born 21 January 1982) is a French former female boxer. She won a silver medal at the Rio Olympics in 2016 before she retired to found a gym in Paris.

== Life ==
Ourahmoune was born in 1982 in Sèvres. She is of Algerian descent and she has relations in Algeria. She would visit there each year with her family. She became a boxer in France when she mistakenly asked if that club organised many sports. They only did one, so she tried it and she enjoyed her first experience. France had outlawed women from boxing but they relaxed the rules in 1999. She had already been training and she fought in some of the first legal fights.

She won a silver medal at the 2016 Summer Olympics in Rio de Janeiro, in the women's flyweight. She was beaten by the British Boxer Nicola Adams who was the first ever female Olympic champion at the previous Olympics in 2012. The fight was won on points with Ourahmoune being chosen in only one round. Ourahmoune had announced her retirement before the match.

She continued in boxing as an entrepreneur she opened up her own gym in the 13th arrondissement of Paris. The gym was called Boxing inside.

In 2024 she stood in a joint bid with the previous President of the French Boxing Federation, Dominique Nato, to be the President. She wasn't the only female candidate as Estelle Mossely the 2016 Olympic lightweight champion was also standing. However in the November she withdrew a month before the election. She cited the racist and sexist abuse she had received as the reason.
