= 2010 Women's European Union Amateur Boxing Championships =

Boxing competitions

2010 Women's European Union Boxing Championships
- Host city: Keszthely
- Country: Hungary
- Nations: 21
- Athletes: 107
- Dates: 4–7 August
- Main venue: Hotel Heilkon

The 2010 Women's European Union Amateur Boxing Championships were held in the Hotel Helikon in Keszthely, Hungary from August 4 to August 7. The 5th edition of this annual competition was organised by the European governing body for amateur boxing, the European Boxing Confederation (EUBC). 107 fighters from 21 federations competed in 11 weight divisions.

== Medal winners ==
Event	Gold	Silver	Bronze
46 kg	(Turkey) Serpil Yassıkaya	(England) Vesna Fisher	(Hungary) Csilla Dobradi (Romania) Eugenia Anghel
48 kg	(Italy) Valeria Calabrese	(Hungary) Katalin Ancsin	(Spain) Zurine Celaya (Turkey) Binnur Sakal
51 kg	(Bulgaria) Stoyka Petrova	(Turkey) Sümeyra Kaya-Yazıcı	(France) Virginie Nave (Hungary) Vivien Mizsei
54 kg	(Turkey) Ayşe Taş	(Greece) Evginia Tasidou	(France) Lorna Weaver (Hungary) Csilla Nemedi
57 kg	(France) Estelle Mosselly	(Poland) Sandra Kruk	(Germany) Maike Klüners (Belgium) Anna Beusenlinck
60 kg	(Republic of Ireland) Katie Taylor	(Bulgaria) Denitsa Eliseyeva	(Poland) Karolina Graczyk (Finland) Mira Potkonen
64 kg	(Turkey) Gulsum Tatar	(England) Chantelle Cameron	(Greece) Hristina Athanasopoulou (Bulgaria) Margarita Cheneva
69 kg	(Hungary) Bianka Nagy	(England) Savannah Marshall	(Poland) Justyna Sroczyńska (Netherlands) Marichelle de Jong
75 kg	(Hungary) Mária Kovács	(France) Alexandra De Hutten	(Turkey) Elif Guneri (Germany) Ulrike Brückner
81 kg	(France) Erika Guerrier	(Hungary) Tímea Nagy	(Romania) Luminita Turcin (Poland) Sylwia Kusiak
+81 kg	(Poland) Anna Słowik	(Hungary) Lilla Sandor	(Turkey) Semsi Yarali; None awarded

== Medal count table ==
2010 Women's European Union Amateur Boxing Championship
Pos	Country	Gold	Silver	Bronze	Total
1	Turkey	3	1	3	7
2	Hungary	2	3	3	8
3	France	2	1	2	5
4	Poland	1	1	3	5
5	Bulgaria	1	1	1	3
6	Ireland	1	0	0	1
6	Italy	1	0	0	1
8	England	0	3	0	3
9	Greece	0	1	1	2
10	Germany	0	0	2	2
10	Romania	0	0	2	2
12	Belgium	0	0	1	1
12	Spain	0	0	1	1
12	Finland	0	0	1	1
12	Netherlands	0	0	1	1
	Total	11	11	21	
