= 2005 Women's World Amateur Boxing Championships =

Boxing competitions

- Location: Podolsk, Russia
- Dates: September 25-October 2, 2005

The 2005 Women's World Amateur Boxing Championships was an international women's boxing competition hosted by Russia from September 25 to October 2, 2005 in Podolsk. It was the 3rd championship, which debuted 2001 in Scranton, Pennsylvania, United States.

The World Championship was contested in 13 weight disciplines by 152 amateur woman boxers from 28 countries.

Russia won seven gold, one silver and four bronze medals, while Canada finished second with one gold, one silver and two bronze medals, followed by India with a tally of 1-0-4. The Canadian, Mary Spencer (66 kg) was awarded "Best Boxer of the Competition".

== Participating nations ==
- Argentina
- Australia
- Belarus
- Bulgaria
- Canada
- Denmark
- Egypt
- Finland
- France
- Hungary
- India
- (Republic of Ireland) Ireland
- Italy
- Kazakhstan
- Mongolia
- Netherlands
- North Korea
- Norway
- Philippines
- Poland
- (Taiwan) Republic of China
- Romania
- Russia
- Sweden
- Switzerland
- Turkey
- Ukraine
- (United States) USA

== Results ==
Event	Gold	Silver	Bronze
Pinweight (–46 kg)	Mary Kom; India	Jong Ok; North Korea	Yelena Sabitova; Russia Gretchen Abaniel; Philippines
Light flyweight (–48 kg)	Olesya Gladkova; Russia	Ri Jong-hyang; North Korea	Camelia Negrea; Romania Yésica Bopp; Argentina
Flyweight (–50 kg)	Simona Galassi; Italy	Ri Hyang-mi; North Korea	Kalpana Choudhury; India Viktoriya Usachenko; Russia
Light bantamweight (–52 kg)	Sofya Ochigava; Russia	Sümeyra Kaya; Turkey	Samiha Yassan; Egypt Viktoria Rudenko; Ukraine
Bantamweight (–54 kg)	Mihaela Cijevschi; Romania	Dina Burger; Switzerland	Pak Kyong-ok; North Korea Laishram Sarita Devi; India
Featherweight (–57 kg)	Yelena Karpacheva; Russia	Yun Kum-ju; North Korea	Sandra Bizier; Canada Zsuzsana Szuknai; Hungary
Lightweight (–60 kg)	Tatyana Chalaya; Russia	Gülsüm Tatar; Turkey	Kang Kum-hui; North Korea Mitchel Martinez; Philippines
Light welterweight (–63 kg)	Yulia Nemtsova; Russia	Cecilia Brækhus; Norway	Katie Dunn; Canada Vinni Busk Skovgaard; Denmark
Welterweight (–66 kg)	Mary Spencer; Canada	Irina Sinezkaya; Russia	Oleksandra Kozlan; Ukraine Yvonne Bæk Rasmussen; Denmark
Light middleweight (–70 kg)	Olga Slavinskaya; Russia	Ariane Fortin; Canada	Chenthittail Aswathimol; India Nurcan Çarkçı; Turkey
Middleweight (–75 kg)	Anna Laurell; Sweden	Olga Novikova; Ukraine	Mariya Yavorskaya; Russia Anita Ducza; Hungary
Light heavyweight (–80 kg)	Galina Ivanova; Russia	Selma Yağcı; Turkey	Beata Malek; Poland Tyler Lord-Wilder; United States
Heavyweight (–86 kg)	Mária Kovács; Hungary	Şemsi Yaralı; Turkey	Mariya Reyngard; Russia Jyotsna Kumari; India

== Medal count table ==
2005 World Women's Boxing Championship
Pos	Country	Gold	Silver	Bronze	Total
1	Russia	7	1	4	12
2	Canada	1	1	2	4
3	India	1		4	5
4	Hungary	1		2	3
5	Romania	1		1	2
6	Italy	1			1
6=	Sweden	1			1
8	North Korea		4	2	6
9	Turkey		4	1	5
10	Ukraine		1	2	3
11	Norway		1		1
11=	Switzerland		1		1
13	Denmark			2	2
13=	Philippines			2	2
15	Argentina			1	1
15=	Egypt			1	1
15=	Poland			1	1
15=	United States			1	1
	Total	13	13	26	52
