= Meltem Akar =

Turkish boxer (born 1982)

Personal information
- Nationality: Turkey
- Born: Meltem Akar; May 12, 1982 (age 44) Giresun, Turkey
- Weight: Light Flyweight

Boxing career
Medal record
Women's Boxing
Representing Turkey
European Union Championships
Gold medal – first place	2011 Katowice, Poland	48 kg

Meltem Akar (born May 12, 1982) is a Turkish female boxer competing in the light flyweight (48 kg) division.

She is the daughter of Şenol Akar, who was between 1975 and 1980 an active amateur boxer in Giresun.

Meltem Akar started boxing in 2006. She is coached by Metin Kısa. At the 2011 Women's European Union Amateur Boxing Championships held in Katowice, Poland, she became champion.

Currently, she is a student of physical education and sports at the Black Sea Technical University.

== See also ==
- List of female boxers
