= Brzezice, Lublin Voivodeship =

Brzezice
- Village
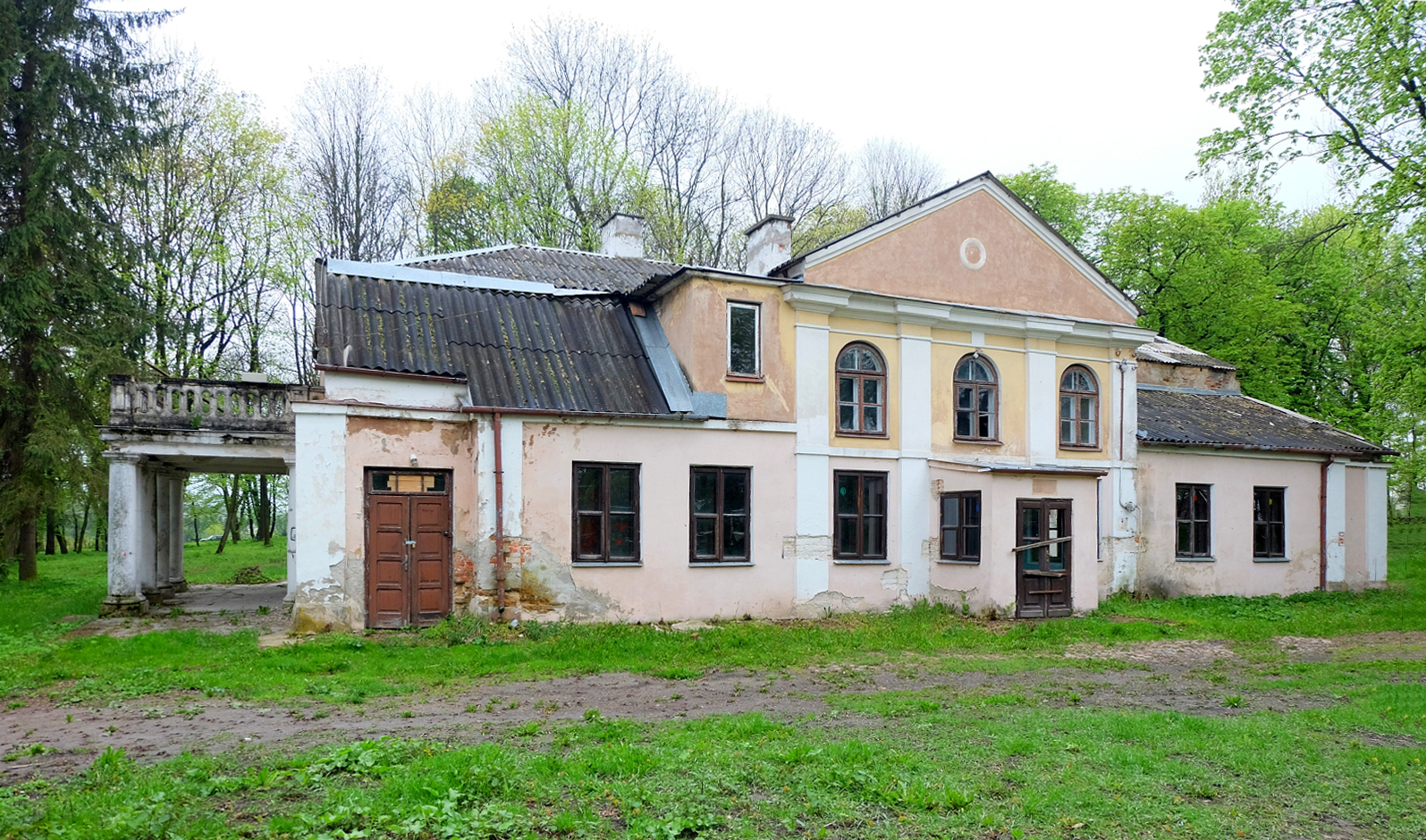
- Manor in the village

- Location within Poland
- Coordinates: 51°9′N 22°54′E
- Country: Poland
- Voivodeship: Lublin
- County: Świdnik
- Gmina: Piaski

Brzezice [bʐɛˈʑit͡sɛ] is a village in the administrative district of Gmina Piaski, within Świdnik County, Lublin Voivodeship, in eastern Poland.

== Notable people ==
- Karolina Michalczuk, Polish boxer
