= Ariane Fortin =

Canadian boxer (born 1984)

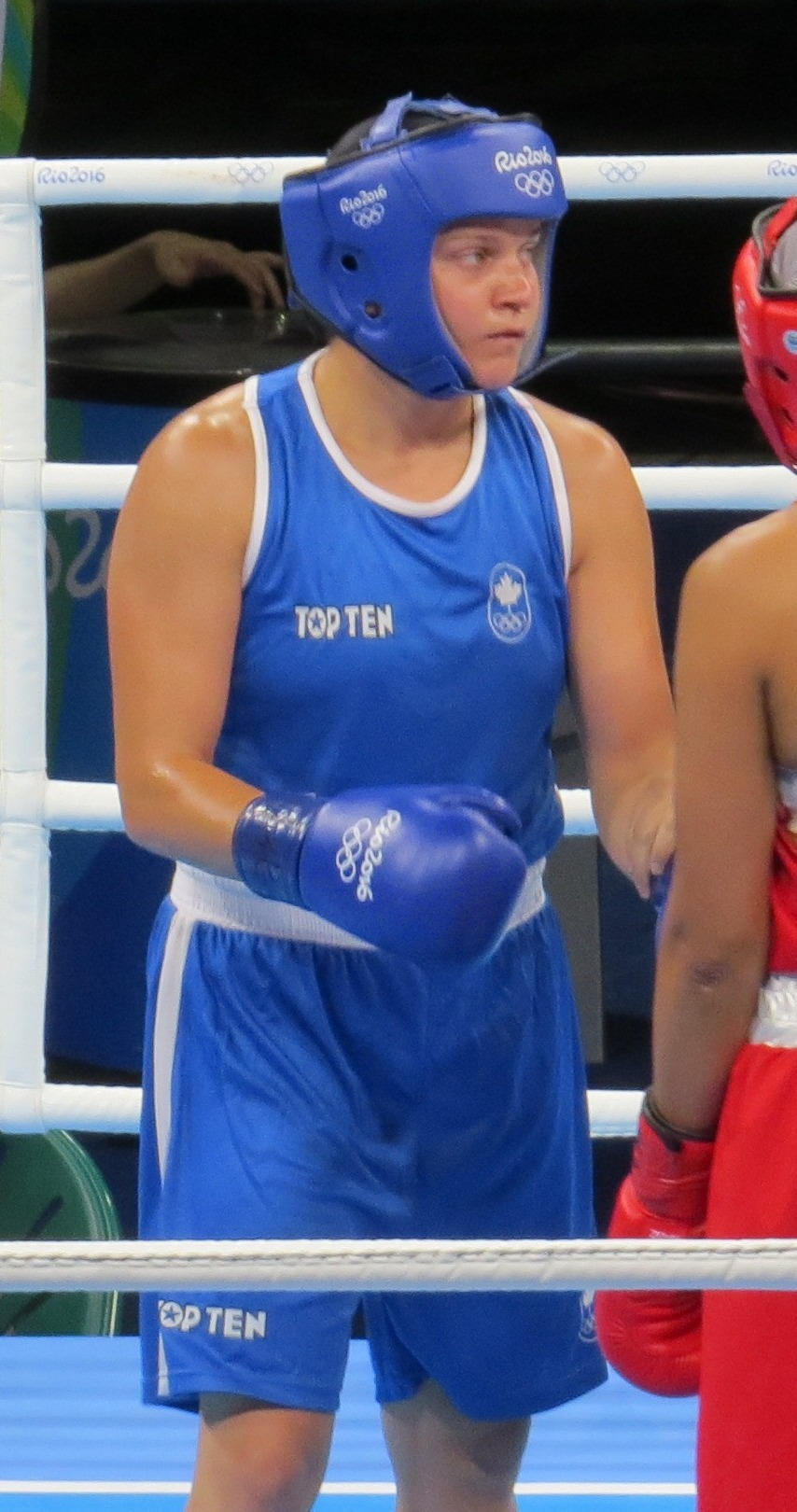
- Fortin at the 2016 Olympics

Personal information
- Nationality: Canada
- Born: November 20, 1984 (age 41) Quebec, Canada
- Height: 180 cm (5 ft 11 in)
- Weight: 75 kg (165 lb)

Sport
- Sport: Boxing
- Weight class: Middleweight
- Club: Underdog Boxing Club
- Coached by: Daniel Trepanier (national); Mike Moffa (personal)
Medal record
Women's amateur boxing
Representing Canada
World Championships
Gold medal – first place	2006 New Delhi	Light middleweight
Gold medal – first place	2008 Ningbo	Light middleweight
Silver medal – second place	2005 Podolsk	Light middleweight
Bronze medal – third place	2014 Jeju	Middleweight
Commonwealth Games
Silver medal – second place	2014 Glasgow	Middleweight
Pan American Games
Bronze medal – third place	2015 Toronto	Light heavyweight

Ariane Fortin (born November 20, 1984) is a Canadian southpaw amateur boxer. She is a two-time World Boxing Champion. She also won a silver medal in the middleweight category at the 2014 Commonwealth Games and a bronze medal at the 2015 Pan American Games in Toronto, Canada.

In order to compete at the 2014 Commonwealth Games, as well as the World Championship in 2014, Ariane ran a successful crowdfunding campaign on Makeachamp.com.

Fortin took up boxing in 2004. In 2005, at 21 years old, she took part in the 2005 World Championships and won the silver medal. A year later, she won the gold medal at the 2006 World Championships in New Delhi, and repeated the same performance at the 2008 World Championships in Ningbo, China.

After failing to qualify to the 2012 Summer Olympics decided to move to another country with less rivalry in boxing. She chose Lebanon and started learning Arabic, but reconsidered after intervention from the International Amateur Boxing Association. Her attempts to qualify for the 2012 Olympics were presented in the 2013 Canadian documentary Last Woman Standing.

In 2014, she competed in the World Championships in South Korea and took the bronze medal, suffering her only loss in the semifinal against American and already Olympic champion Claressa Shields.

In July 2016, she was officially named to Canada's Olympic team. At the Olympics she was eliminated in the first bout in a controversial split decision.
