= Ayşe Taş =

Turkish boxer

Personal information
- Nationality: Turkish
- Born: February 19, 1987 (age 39)
- Weight: Bantamweight

Boxing career
Medal record
Women's boxing
Representing Turkey
World Championships
Bronze medal – third place	2014 Jeju	54 kg
European Championships
Bronze medal – third place	2011 Rotterdam	54 kg
European Union Championships
Gold medal – first place	2011 Katowice	54 kg
Gold medal – first place	2010 Keszthely	54 kg
Silver medal – second place	2007 Lille	52 kg

Ayşe Taş (born February 19, 1987) is a Turkish female boxer competing in the Bantamweight (54 kg) division. She is a member of the Fenerbahçe Boxing team.

As of December 1, 2010, Ayşe Taş ranked second in her weight category on the "World Women's Rankings" list.

== Achievements ==
- 2007 Women's European Union Amateur Boxing Championships Lille, France 52 kg - Silver
- 2010 Women's European Union Amateur Boxing Championships Keszthely, Hungary 54 kg - Gold
- 2011 Women's European Union Amateur Boxing Championships Katowice, Poland 54 kg - Gold
- 2011 Rotterdam, Netherlands 54 kg - Bronze
