= Emma Brammer vs. Andrea Prime =

First women's boxing match in England

- Date: 17 March 1998
- Venue: Leicester, England

Tale of the tape
Boxer	Emma Brammer	Andrea Prime
Age	14	13

Result
- Brammer wins

Emma Brammer vs. Andrea Prime was a women's amateur boxing match held on 17 March 1998 in Leicester, England, between fourteen-year-old Emma Brammer and thirteen-year-old Andrea Prime. It was scheduled to be the first women's boxing match to take place after a ban on women's amateur boxing was lifted in October of the previous year, however the match was postponed twice, during which a pair of sixteen-year-old girls became the first women to officially box.

The fight was originally planned to take place on 2 October 1997, officially endorsed by the UK Amateur Boxing Association. It received wide media attention after being announced, and was criticised by several professional boxers, commentators, and doctors, with the British Medical Association calling the lifted ban "demented". Brammer subsequently pulled out of the fight, which her father said was due to the negative publicity of the match.

The fight was later rescheduled to 3 March 1998, but was once again called off, this time by the fight promoter, citing negative publicity as the reason, after the manager of heavyweight champion Lennox Lewis described the fight as a "freak show", and the Daily Mail called it a "bout of madness". The match eventually took place two weeks later on 17 March, with Brammer winning the bout. The news of the match inspired Amanda Coulson to begin boxing.
