= Serpil Yassıkaya =

Turkish boxer

Personal information
- Nationality: Turkish
- Born: Giresun, Turkey
- Weight: Pinweight

Boxing career
Medal record
Women's Boxing
Representing Turkey
European Union Championships
Gold medal – first place	2010 Keszthely, Hungary	46 kg
Silver medal – second place	2009 Pazardzhik, Bulgaria	46 kg
Bronze medal – third place	2008 Liverpool, England	46 kg
Bronze medal – third place	2006 Porto Torres, Italy	46 kg

Serpil Yassıkaya is a Turkish boxer who competes in the pinweight (46 kg) division.

== Achievements ==
- 2006 Women's European Union Amateur Boxing Championships Porto Torres, Italy 46 kg - Bronze
- 2008 Women's European Union Amateur Boxing Championships Liverpool, England 46 kg - Bronze
- 2009 Women's European Union Amateur Boxing Championships Pazardzhik, Bulgaria 46 kg - Silver
- 2010 Women's European Union Amateur Boxing Championships Keszthely, Hungary 46 kg - Gold
