= Selma Yağcı =

Turkish boxer (born 1981)

Personal information
- Nationality: Turkish
- Born: February 1, 1981 (age 45) Denizli, Turkey
- Weight: cruiserweight
Medal record
Women's boxing
World Championships
Bronze medal – third place	2008 Ningbo, China	80 kg
Silver medal – second place	2005 Podolsk, Russia	80 kg
Bronze medal – third place	2001 Scranton, USA	90 kg
European Championships
Silver medal – second place	2009 Mykolaiv, Ukraine	81 kg
Bronze medal – third place	2007 Vejle, Denmark	80 kg
Bronze medal – third place	2006 Warsaw, Poland	80 kg
Bronze medal – third place	2005 Tønsberg, Norway	80 kg
Bronze medal – third place	2004 Riccione, Italy	80 kg
European Union Championships
Gold medal – first place	2008 Liverpool, England	80 kg
Gold medal – first place	2007 Lille, France	80 kg

Selma Yağcı (born February 1, 1981) is a Turkish female boxer competing in the cruiserweight division. She is a member of the Municipality club in Denizli, Turkey.

She won a bronze medal in the light heavyweight (90 kg) division at the 1st World Women's Boxing Championship held between October 21 and 27, 2001 in Scranton, Pennsylvania, United States before she fought a silver medal in the cruiserweight (80 kg) division at the 3rd World Women's Boxing Championship held between September 25 and October 2, 2005 in Podolsk, Russia. At the 5th AIBA Women's World Boxing Championship held between November 22 and 29, 2008 in Ningbo City, China, Selma Yağcı became a bronze medalist in her division (80 kg).

== Achievements ==
- 2001 Women's World Amateur Boxing Championships Scranton, United States 90 kg - Bronze
- 2004 Women's European Amateur Boxing Championships Riccione, Italy 80 kg - Bronze
- 2005 Women's World Amateur Boxing Championships Podolsk, Russia 80 kg - Silver
- 2005 Women's European Amateur Boxing Championships Tønsberg, Norway 80 kg - Bronze
- 2006 Women's European Amateur Boxing Championships Warsaw, Poland 80 kg - Bronze
- 2007 Women's European Amateur Boxing Championships Vejle, Denmark 80 kg - Bronze
- 2007 Women's European Union Amateur Boxing Championships Lille, France 80 kg - Gold
- 2008 World Women's Boxing Championship Ningbo, China 80 kg - Bronze
- 2008 Women's European Union Amateur Boxing Championships Liverpool, England 80 kg - Gold
- 2009 Women's European Amateur Boxing Championships Mykolaiv, Ukraine 81 kg - Silver|
