= 2008 AIBA Women's World Boxing Championships =

Boxing competitions

2008 Women's World Amateur Boxing Championships
- Location: Ningbo City
- Dates: November 22-29, 2008

The 2008 AIBA Women's World Boxing Championships was an international women's boxing competition hosted by China from November 22 to 29, 2008 in Ningbo City. It was the 5th championship, which debuted 2001 in Scranton, Pennsylvania, United States.

The World Championship was contested in 13 weight disciplines by 218 amateur women boxers from 41 countries, and was conducted in the Ningbo Sports Center.

China won four gold, two silver and four bronze medals, while Turkey finished second with two gold and two bronze medals, followed by Canada with a tally of 2-0-1. India, the champion in the 2006 edition, were fourth with one gold, one silver and two bronze.

== Participating nations ==
- Argentina (4)
- Australia (5)
- Brazil (2)
- Canada (8)
- China (13)
- Chinese Taipei (6)
- Croatia (1)
- Czech Republic (1)
- Denmark (3)
- Egypt (5)
- England (4)
- France (6)
- Germany (3)
- Greece (1)
- Hong Kong (1)
- Hungary (7)
- India (7)
- Indonesia (3)
- Ireland (1)
- Japan (7)
- Kazakhstan (11)
- Latvia (1)
- Mongolia (6)
- Netherlands (1)
- North Korea (10)
- Norway (2)
- Papua New Guinea (2)
- Philippines (6)
- Poland (7)
- Portugal (1)
- Romania (10)
- Russia (13)
- South Korea (3)
- Sri Lanka (2)
- Sweden (7)
- Switzerland (1)
- Trinidad and Tobago (3)
- Turkey (11)
- Ukraine (13)
- United States (12)
- Vietnam (8)

== Medal summary ==
=== Medalists ===
Event	Gold	Silver	Bronze
Pinweight (–46 kg)	Mary Kom; India	Steluța Duță; Romania	Jong Ok; North Korea Josie Gabuco; Philippines
Light flyweight (–48 kg)	Sarah Ourahmoune^{1} France	Alexandra Kuleshova; Russia	Jenny Haedingz; Sweden
Flyweight (–50 kg)	Kim Hyang-ok; North Korea	Elena Savelyeva; Russia	Analisa Cruz; Philippines Chhotu Loura; India
Light bantamweight (–52 kg)	Ren Cancan; China	Annie Albania; Philippines	Viktoria Rudenko; Ukraine Sarita Devi; India
Bantamweight (–54 kg)	Karolina Michalczuk; Poland	Nicola Adams; England	Zhang Qin; China Cynthia Moreno; United States
Featherweight (–57 kg)	Qin Jian; China	Usha Nagisetty; India	Sofya Ochigava; Russia Edina Pezdány; Hungary
Lightweight (–60 kg)	Katie Taylor; Ireland	Dong Cheng; China	Ayzanat Gadzhieva; Russia Cindy Orain; France
Light welterweight (–63 kg)	Gülsüm Tatar; Turkey	Liubov Lopatina; Russia	Ma Jianxia; China Klara Svensson; Sweden
Welterweight (–66 kg)	Mary Spencer; Canada	Vanessa Jackson; United States	Ri Suk-yong; North Korea Wang Qian; China
Light middleweight (–70 kg)	Ariane Fortin; Canada	Yang Tingting; China	Nurcan Çarkçı; Turkey Yelena Koltsova; Kazakhstan
Middleweight (–75 kg)	Li Jinzi; China	Anna Laurell; Sweden	Amber Konikow; Canada Anita Ducza; Hungary
Light heavyweight (–80 kg)	Tang Jieli; China	Mioshia Wagoner; United States	Selma Yağcı; Turkey Fetti Paraschiva; Romania
Heavyweight (–86 kg)	Şemsi Yaralı; Turkey	Adriana Hosu; Romania	Tiffanie Hearn; United States Zhang Lina; China

^{1} Ying Chen (China) originally won the gold medal but was disqualified for failing doping test.

=== Medal table ===
* Host nation (China)

Rank	Nation	Gold	Silver	Bronze	Total
1	China*	4	2	4	10
2	Turkey	2	0	2	4
3	Canada	2	0	1	3
4	India	1	1	2	4
5	North Korea	1	0	2	3
6	France	1	0	1	2
7	Ireland	1	0	0	1
7	Poland	1	0	0	1
9	Russia	0	3	2	5
10	United States	0	2	2	4
11	Romania	0	2	1	3
12	Philippines	0	1	2	3
12	Sweden	0	1	2	3
14	England	0	1	0	1
15	Hungary	0	0	2	2
16	Kazakhstan	0	0	1	1
16	Ukraine	0	0	1	1
Totals (17 entries)		13	13	25	51

== Competitions ==
=== Preliminary rounds ===
November 22, 2008
Weight	Red		Blue
48 kg
	Kalpana Chowdhury (India)	5 – 6	(Canada) Jacqueline Park
	Monika Csik (Hungary)	2 – 7	(Philippines) Alice Kate Aparri
	Sofie Maja Molholt (Denmark)	10 – 5	(Chinese Taipei) Pin Meng-chieh
	Nandintsetseg Myagmardulam (Mongolia)	3 – 13	(France) Sarah Ourahmoune
50 kg
	Indri Sambaimana (Indonesia)	4 – 12	(Japan) Naoko Fujioka
	Bolortuul Tumurkhuyag (Mongolia)	3 – 11	(Romania) Diana Timofte
	Rasha Arafa (Egypt)	0 – 12	(Turkey) Sumeyra Yazici
	Kim Hyang Ok (North Korea)	11 – 1	(Portugal) Sandra Silva
	Cheryl Lyn Houlihan (United States)	1 – 10	(China) Li Si Yuan
	Mandy Bujold (Canada)	7 – 2	(Brazil) Stella Soares
54 kg
	Papita Sabina (Romania)	2 – 10	(North Korea) Ri Chung Son
	Flordelyn Digmayo (Philippines)	1 – 9	(Vietnam) Nguyen Thi Hue
	Abigael Busira Yunike (Indonesia)	2 – 10	(Chinese Taipei) Chen Chia-ling
	Suvd-Erdene Oyungerel (Mongolia)	9 – 6	(Australia) Maria Pittiglio
	Cynthia Marella Moreno (United States)	10 – 4	(Germany) Cindy Metz
	Debora Dioncius (Argentina)	5 – 7	(India) Sushma Kumari Yadav
	Sofija Sidorova (Latvia)	14 – 2	(Kazakhstan) Oxana Koroleva
	Lyudmyla Hrytsay (Ukraine)	1 – 8	(England) Nicola Adams
	Meryem Zeybek Aslan (Turkey)	2 – 6	(Russia) Liudmila Bondarenko
	Lorna Weaver (France)	9 – 7	(Canada) Melissa Guillemette
	Jang A Eun (South Korea)	10 – 5	(Papua New Guinea) Mary Greg
60 kg
	Nguyen Thi Vui (Vietnam)	1 – 11	(Russia) Ayzznat Gadzhieva
	Gonca Yilmaz (Turkey)	0 – 12	(Czech Republic) Danusa Dilhofova
	Katie Taylor (Republic of Ireland)	20 – 3	(Australia) Emma Carruthers
	Adriana Araujo (Brazil)	5 – 11	(Argentina) Peralta Celeste
	Sandra Bruegger (Switzerland)	13 – 3	(Japan) Mikako Inagaki
November 23, 2008
Weight	Red		Blue
46 kg
	Nguyen Thi Hoa (Vietnam)	3 – 7	(Philippines) Josie Gabuco
	Natalie Lungo-Vesenne (Sweden)	RSC R2 1:39	(Mongolia) Ariunjargal Battulga
	Svetlana Gnevanova (Russia)	5 – 7	(Romania) Steluta Duta
	Anusha Kodithuwakku (Sri Lanka)	3 – 10	(Kazakhstan) Nazgul Boranbayeva
	Lin Wang-ting (Chinese Taipei)	3 – 6	(North Korea) Jong Ok
	Risa Sugimoto (Japan)	1 – 24	(India) Mary Kom
	Guan Xiao Feng (China)	9 – 0	(Turkey) Serpil Yassikaya
52 kg
	Jagoda Karge (Poland)	7 - +7	(Kazakhstan) Shakhnoza Issakhanova
	Laishram Sarita (India)	12 – 5	(France) Ouchen Saliha
	Nana Yoshikawa (Japan)	3 – 15	(Egypt) Samiha Hassan
57 kg
	Ingrid Egner (Norway)	1 – 9	(North Korea) Yun Kum Ju
	Mariya Sobchuk (Ukraine)	2 – 15	(Russia) Sofya Ochigava
	Sapreen Ail (Egypt)	1 – 15	(Poland) Karolina Graczyk
	Qin Jian (China)	12 – 3	(Germany) Tasheena Bugar
	Cheng Ting-chun (Chinese Taipei)	1 – 9	(Sweden) Tatjana Obradovic
	Jamila Jones (Trinidad and Tobago)	4 – 3	(Vietnam) Ngo Thi Chung
	Zhulduzay Imanbayeva (Kazakhstan)	2 – 11	(Turkey) Nagihan Gul
63 kg
	Oliwia Luczak (Poland)	4 – 5	(Australia) Claire Ghabrial
	Csilla Csejtei (Hungary)	1 – 8	(Ukraine) Oleksandra Kozlan
	Ri Hyon Hwa (North Korea)	10 – 7	(Argentina) Pineda Nanci
	Amanda Coulson (England)	4 – 13	(Canada) Mary Spencer
	Marichelle de Jong (Netherlands)	8 – 10	(Russia) Irina Poteyeva
70 kg
	Ewa Piatkowska (Poland)	1 – 12	(Russia) Elena Vystropova
	Arianne Fortin (Canada)	RSC R1 2:00	(United States) Elena Parks Grace
	Liliya Durnyeva (Ukraine)	6 – 1	(Sweden) Ronja Holgersson
	Rana Abdelhamid (Egypt)	4 – 8	(Turkey) Nurcan Çarkçı
75 kg
	Meredith Anne Della Giustian (United States)	13 – 6	(Kazakhstan) Yuldus Mamatkulova
	Ivashchenko Tetyana (Ukraine)	2 – 11	(Romania) Luminita Turcin
	Maria Yavorskaya (Russia)	0 – 10	(China) Li Jin Zi
86 kg
	Zhang Li Na (China)	8 – 6	(Russia) Elena Surkova
	Şemsi Yaralı (Turkey)	10 – 0	(Ukraine) Inna Shevchenko
	Sylwia Kusiak (Poland)	2 – 12	(United States) Tiffanie Nichole Hearn
November 24, 2008
Weight	Red		Blue
48 kg
	Lidia Ion (Romania)	15 – 1	(Vietnam) Hoangthi Thom
	Chen Ying (China)	12 – 0	(Japan) Kumiko Ikehara
	Alexandra Kuleshova (Russia)	9 – 5	(Kazakhstan) Nargul Boranbayeva
	Gulseda Basibutun (Turkey)	2 – 5	(North Korea) Ri Jong Hyang
	Jenny Haedingz (Sweden)	10 – 2	(United States) Marlen Esparza
	Selly Wanimpo (Indonesia)	4 – 9	(Ukraine) Tetiana Dakhina
	Jacqueline Park (Canada)	4 – 3	(Philippines) Alice Kate Aparri
	Sofie Maja Molholt (Denmark)	4 – 12	(France) Sarah Ourahmoune
50 kg
	Chhoto Loura (India)	17 – 4	(Vietnam) Ngu Thi Thuyet
	Nam Eun Jin (South Korea)	1 – 14	(France) Nave Virginie
	Elena Savelyeva (Russia)	6 – 5	(Kazakhstan) Aigerim Askarova
	Tetyana Kob (Ukraine)	7 – 6	(Sri Lanka) Nilmini Jayasinghe
	Benavidez Paola (Argentina)	5 – 6	(Philippines) Analisa Cruz
	Naoko Fujioka (Japan)	4 – 10	(Romania) Diana Timofte
	Sumeyra Yazici (Turkey)	4 – 10	(North Korea) Kim Hyang Ok
	Li Si Yuan (China)	13 – 3	(Canada) Mandy Bujold
54 kg
	Ayako Minowa (Japan)	13 – 3	(Norway) Tonje Sorlie
	Hoi Lam Ho (Hong Kong)	RSC R2 1:22	(Poland) Karolina Michalczuk
	Zhang Qin (China)	8 – 2	(North Korea) Ri Chung Son
	Nguyen Thi Hue (Vietnam)	1 – 8	(Chinese Taipei) Chen Chia-Ling
	Suvd-Erdene Oyungerel (Mongolia)	3 – 15	(United States) Cynthia Marella Moreno
	Sushma Kumari Yadav (India)	5 – 3	(Latvia) Sofija Sidorova
	Nicola Adams (England)	11 – 2	(Russia) Liudmila Bondarenko
	Lorna Weaver (France)	12 – 5	(South Korea) Jang A Eun
57 kg
	Chisato Mizuno (Japan)	RSCH R2 1:24	(Australia) Sabrina Ostawari
	Usha Nagisetty (India)	12 – 1	(Mongolia) Erdenegerel Burmaa
	Malene Christina Kloster Nielsen (Denmark)	2 – 4	(England) Lucy Abel
	Edina Pezdany (Hungary)	7 – 5	(United States) Alexandria brianne Cardenas
	Athina Malefaki (Greece)	RSC R2 1:03	(North Korea) Yun Kum Ju
	Sofya Ochigava (Russia)	RSCH R1 2:00	(Poland) Karolina Graczyk
	Qin Jian (China)	11 – 4	(Sweden) Tatjana Obradovic
	Jamila Jones (Trinidad and Tobago)	7 – 8	(Turkey) Nagihan Gul
80 kg
	Beata Lesnik (Poland)	15 – 7	(Germany) Ulrike Brueckner
	Tang Li Jie (China)	7 – 6	(Hungary) Maria Kovacs
	Marina Volnova (Kazakhstan)	3 – 18	(Russia) Anna Gladkikh
	Iryna Komar (Ukraine)	3 – 11	(Turkey) Selma Yağcı
November 25, 2008
Weight	Red		Blue
52 kg
	le Thi Ngan Hang (Vietnam)	RET R2 1:17	(Romania) Denisa Amza
	Shim Hui Jeong (South Korea)	1 – 23	(China) Ren Can Can
	Chiu Ching-Ya (Chinese Taipei)	6 – 5	(Sweden) Shipra Nilsson
	Viktoria Rudenko (Ukraine)	11 – 8	(Turkey) Ayse Tas
	Tong Song Hye (North Korea)	11 – 6	(Russia) Victoria Usachenko
	Sacred Downing (United States)	0 – 18	(Philippines) Annie Albania
	Tserenchimeg Tserendorj (Mongolia)	RSC R3 0:56	(Kazakhstan) Shakhnoza Issakhanova
	Laishram Sarita (India)	12 – 5	(Egypt) Samiha Hassan
60 kg
	Leeann Boodram (Trinidad and Tobago)	2 – 15	(Philippines) Mitchel Martinez
	Dong Cheng (China)	7 – 3	(India) Preeti Beniwal
	Cindy Orain (France)	15 – 3	(Romania) Iulia Navacioiu
	Caroline Barry (United States)	17 – 6	(Chinese Taipei) Su Wen-Hsien
	Oleksandra Sydorenko (Ukraine)	RSC R1 1:05	(Hungary) Beata Szabo
	Kim Hye Yong (North Korea)	4 - +4	(Russia) Ayzznat Gadzhieva
	Danusa Dilhofova (Czech Republic)	3 – 4	(Republic of Ireland) Katie Taylor
	Peralta Celeste (Argentina)	5 – 1	(Switzerland) Sandra Bruegger
63 kg
	Timea Nagy (Hungary)	6 – 11	(Sweden) Klara Svensson
	Yana Zavyalov (Ukraine)	5 – 2	(France) Bertaud Lucie
	Liubov Lopatina (Russia)	8 – 1	(Romania) Larisa Rosu
	Nguyen Thi Thu Huong (Vietnam)	1 – 13	(England) Natasha Jonas
	Kathleen Dunn (Canada)	5 – 4	(United States) Quanitta Lee Underwood
	Jian Xia Ma (China)	7 – 4	(Denmark) Yvonne Bak Rasmussen
	Gülsüm Tatar (Turkey)	7 – 5	(Kazakhstan) Saida Khassenova
	Claire Ghabrial (Australia)	1 – 5	(North Korea) Ri Hyon Hwa
66 kg
	Dariga Shakimova (Kazakhstan)	4 – 10	(China) Qian Wang
	Vanessa Nicol Jackson (United States)	11 – 5	(Australia) Naomi-Lee Fischer-Rasmussen
	Ri Suk Yong (North Korea)	10 – 3	(Ukraine) Oleksandra Kozlan
	Mary Spencer (Canada)	8 – 6	(Russia) Irina Poteyeva
70 kg
	Debbie Bkaore (Papua New Guinea)	8 – 17	(Kazakhstan) Yelena Koltsova
	Jang Un Hui (North Korea)	2 – 19	(China) Yang Ting Ting
	Elena Vystropova (Russia)	3 – 13	(Canada) Arianne Fortin
	Liliya Durnyeva (Ukraine)	6 – 10	(Turkey) Nurcan Çarkçı
75 kg
	Anita Ducza (Hungary)	4 – 2	(Croatia) Nikolina Orlović
	Anna Laurell (Sweden)	10 – 2	(Trinidad and Tobago) Chimere Taylor
	Amber Konikow (Canada)	9 – 2	(United States) Meredith Giustian
	Luminita Turcin (Romania)	2 – 10	(China) Li Jin Zi

=== Quarterfinals ===
November 26, 2008
Weight	Red		Blue
46 kg
	Oxana Shtakun (Ukraine)	3 – 7	(Philippines) Josie Gabuco
	Natalie Lungo-Vesenne (Sweden)	0 – 5	(Romania) Steluta Duta
	Nazgul Boranbayeva (Kazakhstan)	2 – 7	(North Korea) Jong Ok
	Mary Kom (India)	4 – 0	(China) Guan Xiao Feng
48 kg
	Lidia Ion (Romania)	5 – 10	(China) Chen Ying
	Alexandra Kuleshova (Russia)	8 – 2	(North Korea) Ri Jong Hyang
	Jenny Haedingz (Sweden)	9 – 3	(Ukraine) Tetiana Dakhina
	Jacqueline Park (Canada)	2 – 8	(France) Sarah Ourahmoune
50 kg
	Chhoto Loura (India)	4 – 1	(France) Nave Virginie
	Elena Savelyeva (Russia)	5 – 3	(Ukraine) Tetyana Kob
	Analisa Cruz (Philippines)	13 – 8	(Romania) Diana Timofte
	Kim Hyang Ok (North Korea)	6 – 5	(China) Li Si Yuan
52 kg
	Le Thi Ngan Hang (Vietnam)	3 – 8	(China) Ren Can Can
	Chiu Ching-Ya (Chinese Taipei)	1 – 9	(Ukraine) Viktoria Rudenko
	Tong Song Hye (North Korea)	0 – 10	(Philippines) Annie Albania
	Tserenchimeg Tserendorj (Mongolia)	RSCH R1 1:07	(India) Laishram Sarita
54 kg
	Ayako Minowa (Japan)	2 – 18	(Poland) Karolina Michalczuk
	Zhang Qin (China)	5 – 3	(Chinese Taipei) Chen Chia-Ling
	Cynthia Marella Moreno (United States)	5 – 3	(India) Yadav Sushma Kumari
	Nicola Adams (England)	7 – 2	(France) Lorna Weaver
57 kg
	Sabrina Ostawari (Australia)	1 – 10	(India) Usha Nagisetty
	Lucy Abel (England)	6 – 8	(Hungary) Edina Pezdany
	Yun Kum Ju (North Korea)	1 – 8	(Russia) Sofya Ochigava
	Qin Jian (China)	10 – 3	(Turkey) Nagihan Gul
60 kg
	Mitchel Martinez (Philippines)	3 – 14	(China) Dong Cheng
	Cindy Orain (France)	3 – 0	(United States) Caroline Barry
	Oleksandra Sydorenko (Ukraine)	5 – 13	(Russia) Ayzznat Gadzhieva
	Katie Taylor (Republic of Ireland)	RSC R1 2:00	(Argentina) Peralta Celeste
63 kg
	Klara Svensson (Sweden)	5 – 3	(Ukraine) Yana Zavyalov
	Liubov Lopatina (Russia)	9 – 4	(England) Natasha Jonas
	Kathleen Dunn (Canada)	0 – 11	(China) Jian Xia Ma
	Gülsüm Tatar (Turkey)	6 – 0	(North Korea) Ri Hyon Hwa
80 kg
	Fetti Paraschiva (Romania)	+9 – 9	(Canada) Melinda Watpool
	Mioshia Wagoner (United States)	10 – 4	(Egypt) Nadia Mohamed
	Beata Lesnik (Poland)	2 – 11	(China) Tang Jie Li
	Anna Gladkikh (Russia)	4 – 14	(Turkey) Selma Yağcı

=== Semifinals ===
November 28, 2008
Weight	Red		Blue
46 kg
	Josie Gabuco (Philippines)	5 – 7	(Romania) Steluta Duta
	Jong Ok (North Korea)	3 – 8	(India) Mary Kom
48 kg
	Chen Ying (China)	6 – 5	(Russia) Alexandra Kuleshova
	Jenny Haedingz (Sweden)	0 – 8	(France) Sarah Ourahmoune
50 kg
	Chhoto Loura (India)	2 – 3	(Russia) Elena Savelyeva
	Analisa Cruz (Philippines)	3 – 7	(North Korea) Kim Hyang Ok
52 kg
	Ren Can Can (China)	6 – 3	(Ukraine) Viktoria Rudenko
	Annie Albania (Philippines)	8 – 3	(India) Laishram Sarita
54 kg
	Karolina Michalczuk (Poland)	9 – 4	(China) Zhang Qin
	Cynthia Marella Moreno (United States)	0 – 10	(England) Nicola Adams
57 kg
	Usha Nagisetty (India)	6 – 0	(Hungary) Edina Pezdany
	Sofya Ochigava (Russia)	4 – 6	(China) Qin Jian
60 kg
	Dong Cheng (China)	6 – 1	(France) Cindy Orain
	Ayzznat Gadzhieva (Russia)	2 – 20	(Republic of Ireland) Katie Taylor
63 kg
	Klara Svensson (Sweden)	5 – 8	(Russia) Liubov Lopatina
	Jian Xia Ma (China)	3 – 4	(Turkey) Gülsüm Tatar
66 kg
	Qian Wang (China)	3 – 7	(United States) Vanessa Nicol Jackson
	Ri Suk Yong (North Korea)	2 – 7	(Canada) Mary Spencer
70 kg
	Yelena Koltsova (Kazakhstan)	0 – 19	(China) Yang Ting Ting
	Arianne Fortin (Canada)	16 – 5	(Turkey) Nurcan Çarkçı
75 kg
	Anita Ducza (Hungary)	2 – 8	(Sweden) Anna Laurell
	Amber Konikow (Canada)	0 – 9	(China) Li Jin Zi
80 kg
	Fetti Paraschiva (Romania)	4 – 8	(United States) Mioshia Wagoner
	Tang Jie Li (China)	8 – 6	(Turkey) Selma Yağcı
86 kg
	Adriana Hosu (Romania)	8 – 2	(China) Zhang Li Na
	Şemsi Yaralı (Turkey)	7 – 5	(United States) Tiffanie Nichole Hearn

=== Finals ===
November 29, 2008
Weight	Red		Blue
46 kg
	Steluta Duta (Romania)	1 – 7	(India) Mary Kom
48 kg
	Ying Chen (China)	5 – 1	(France) Sarah Ourahmoune
50 kg
	Elena Savelyeva (Russia)	2 – 9	(North Korea) Kim Hyang Ok
52 kg
	Ren Can Can (China)	4 – 3	(Philippines) Annie Albania
54 kg
	Karolina Michalczuk (Poland)	10 – 6	(England) Nicola Adams
57 kg
	Usha Nagisetty (India)	1 – 6	(China) Qin Jian
60 kg
	Dong Cheng (China)	2 – 13	(Republic of Ireland) Katie Taylor
63 kg
	Liubov Lopatina (Russia)	0 – 11	(Turkey) Gülsüm Tatar
66 kg
	Vanessa Nicol Jackson (United States)	2 – 9	(Canada) Mary Spencer
70 kg
	Yang Ting Ting (China)	6 – 11	(Canada) Arianne Fortin
75 kg
	Anna Laurell (Sweden)	1 – 9	(China) Li Jin Zi
80 kg
	Mioshia Wagoner (United States)	1 – 11	(China) Tang Jie Li
86 kg
	Adriana Hosu (Romania)	2 – 7	(Turkey) Şemsi Yaralı
