= Karolina Michalczuk =

Polish boxer (born 1979)

Personal information
- Nationality: Poland
- Born: 6 December 1979 (age 46) Brzezice, Poland
- Weight: Flyweight

Boxing career
Medal record
Women's boxing
Representing Poland
World Championships
Gold medal – first place	2008 Ningbo City	Bantamweight
Silver medal – second place	2006 New Delhi	Bantamweight
Bronze medal – third place	2012 Qinhuangdao	Flyweight
Bronze medal – third place	2010 Bridgetown	Bantamweight
European Championships
Gold medal – first place	2009 Mykolaiv	Bantamweight
Gold medal – first place	2005 Tønsberg	Bantamweight
Silver medal – second place	2006 Warsaw	Bantamweight
Silver medal – second place	2003 Pécs	Featherweight
Bronze medal – third place	2011 Rotterdam	Flyweight
Bronze medal – third place	2007 Vejle	Bantamweight
EU Amateur Championships
Gold medal – first place	2008 Liverpool	54
Gold medal – first place	2009 Pazardzhik	54
Silver medal – second place	2011 Katowice	51

Karolina Anna Michalczuk (born 6 December 1979) is a world champion boxer, and twice European champion. She was born in Brzezice, a village in eastern Poland. Her club is Paco Lublin.

She represented Poland in the 2012 Summer Olympics taking place in London in the flyweight division. She lost in the Round of 16 to India's Mary Kom 14-19.
