= Lucie Bertaud =

French boxer and mixed martial arts fighter (born 1985)

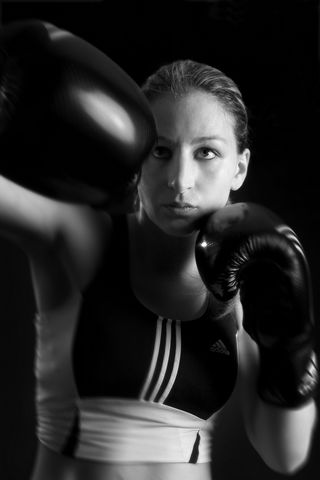
- Born: March 3, 1985 (age 41); Thouars, France
- Other names: Fireball
- Nationality: French
- Height: 5 ft 5 in (1.65 m)
- Weight: 125 lb (57 kg; 8 st 13 lb)
- Division: Flyweight
- Reach: 64.0 in (163 cm)
- Style: Boxing
- Fighting out of: Paris, France
- Team: NR FIGHT
- Years active: 2016–present

Mixed martial arts record
- Total: 7
- Wins: 4
- By decision: 4
- Losses: 3
- By knockout: 2
- By submission: 1

Other information
- Mixed martial arts record from Sherdog

Lucie Bertaud (born 3 March 1985) is a French boxer, mixed martial artist, sports journalist and television personality. She won the European amateur boxing championship in 2007 and five French national boxing titles, and later earned a silver medal in the women's bantamweight division at the 2015 IMMAF World Championships. She subsequently competed professionally in mixed martial arts, including for Bellator MMA.

== Background ==
She grew up in a small town in Maine-et-Loire. For the first time, she entered a boxing gym with her mother Chantal Bertaud. Her first trainer introduced her to martial arts. Integrating very quickly the technical baggage, the trainer sees in her a potential, he will thus register her for her first fight in December 2001. This last one concludes by a throw of the sponge of her opponent.

At the end of her fourth year of boxing, the young girl left her home club to try a career in Paris.

== Boxing ==
Lucie went by chance to the Boxing Beats of Aubervilliers (Seine-Saint-Denis), the club has a solid reputation ("factory of champions"). With her new coach Saïd Bennajem, the beginnings are difficult since she loses in December 2004 against the experienced Lorna Weaver in the category of less than 57 kg. However, since that date she remains undefeated in France. That same year, she was selected by the women's boxing committee for the French championships. She won the 2004/2005 season title (-57 kg) by taking her revenge (won by RSCO) against Weaver.

The following year, the National Technical Director Dominique Nato, detects her, and integrates her in the High Level Sportsmen pole of the INSEP, in the optics of a preparation for the Olympic Games 2008, which were to open to the female boxing. Lucie was the only female boxer training with the elite men's amateur team. She is preparing for a higher education diploma in Sports Management. In the following years, she won the National title in a new category (-60 kg) against Cindy Orain (full contact world champion at the same time), from Nantes, during two consecutive years.

After having obtained a third title of French champion, she leaves the INSEP in June 2007. She then continued her studies and training in Aubervilliers in her original club. The year 2007 is an excellent vintage since, the champion conquers her first European title in a superior weight category (-63 kg) against the vice world champion Klara Svensson (en), in Vejle in Denmark. This performance allows her to be number 2 of the world ranking. She won the national title in the same category a few months later. In March 2008, she met with members of the Lagardère Foundation, who suggested that she join Sciences Po for the new program set up for high-level athletes.

In November 2008, she competed in the world championships in Ningbo, but unfortunately lost in the first round. In January 2009, she decided to hang up her gloves due to an overloaded schedule. In March 2010, she won a new title of French champion against Cindy Orain in the 60 kg1 category. In February 2012, after failing to qualify for the Olympics, she put an end to her career.

== Mixed martial arts ==
Lucie Bertaud became French champion of sambo combat in March 2015 in Claye-Souilly.

Selected by the CFMMA to represent France at the World MMA Championships (IMMAF) in Las Vegas, in July 2015, Lucie Bertaud took the silver medal .

Lucie signs in September 2018 with the American Top Team in Florida a professional fighter contract. Strengthened by her experience, she returns to France, at a time when MMA is about to be legalized. She signed her first big contract with the BELLATOR, and offered herself a historic victory by becoming the first woman to fight in Bercy in MMA at Bellator 248.

A few weeks later, her book "MMA le rêve américain" is published in all French-speaking countries. In it, she explains her journey to the United States and her quest for meaning, which led her to lose herself in order to finally find herself.

On October 29, 2021, after a year's absence due to her participation in the Koh Lanta show, she participated in the second edition of Hexagone MMA. She lost by TKO to Karla Benitez in the third round, to everyone's surprise, after having dominated the whole fight.

Bertaud returned to Bellator against Katarzyna Sadura on May 6, 2022 at Bellator 280. She won the bout via unanimous decision.

== Academic Background ==
- BEES 1st degree sports educator in boxing at the INSEP
- Professional certificate in physical preparation
- Professional certificate in sports nutrition (speciality "weight cutting")
- Master 1 Management of Sports Organizations at INSEP
- Master's degree in journalism from the Sciences Po School of Journalism (2008 - 2010)
- Diploma in TV Journalism from CFPJ (2010 - 2012)

== Professional career ==
Within the Luxembourgish channel KOMBAT SPORT, Lucie became the first female commentator of boxing and MMA (men's fighting). She is also presenter and co-director of the show "Face à face" and "Road to fight". When the channel closed down, Lucie decided to move abroad and embrace again a career as a professional MMA fighter, the time to mourn her "dream job". Then, back in France a year later, Lucie started again as a pro fighter, coach, speaker and freelance journalist. However, the pandemic hit all of her activities. When she returned from the 3 confinements and her adventure in Koh Lanta, Lucie was hired as a freelance journalist by L'Equipe TV, RMC SPORT and WATAA (African channel) to comment on MMA fights. In parallel, she resumed fighting and giving conferences, where she spoke about the ability to bounce back from failure.

== Media ==
- Silhouette role in the series Sécurité Intérieure, broadcast on Canal +.
- Silhouette role in the TV movie Tenir tête, a TV movie by Julia Cordonnier with Sabrina Ouazani and Salim Kechiouche
- Main character in the M6 documentary "La rage de vaincre : 2 filles sur le ring
- Guest of honor of Philipe Bouvard in his show "Les Grosses Têtes
- Lucie is also the subject of an appearance in the music video "Fighting For 2" by Roya ft. Maitre GIMS . She plays the alter ego of Roya the lead singer who fights in life in a figurative sense.
- In 2021, participation in Koh-Lanta : Les Armes secrètes, broadcast on TF13.
- Sports commentator for L'Equipe TV, RMC Sport, Wataa Tv and the streaming platform "Fight Nation".

== Mixed martial arts record ==
Professional record breakdown
7 matches	4 wins	3 losses
By knockout	0	2
By submission	0	1
By decision	4	0

Res.	Record	Opponent	Method	Event	Date	Round	Time	Location	Notes
Win	4–3	Katarzyna Sadura	Decision (unanimous)	Bellator 280	May 6, 2022	3	5:00	Paris, France	
Loss	3–3	Karla Benitez	TKO (punches)	Hexagone MMA 2	October 30, 2021	3	3:18	Paris, France	
Win	3–2	Maguy Berchel	Decision (unanimous)	Bellator 248	October 10, 2020	3	5:00	Paris, France	
Win	2–2	Kelig Pinson	Decision (unanimous)	UAE Warriors 9	November 29, 2019	3	5:00	Abu Dhabi, United Arab Emirates	Flyweight debut.
Loss	1–2	Jessica Borga	TKO (punches)	Titan FC 54	April 26, 2019	1	3:36	Fort Lauderdale, Florida, United States	
Loss	1–1	Diana Filipa	Submission (armbar)	Integra FC 9	May 5, 2018	1	4:43	Wittlich, Germany	Catchweight (132 lb) bout.
Win	1–0	Morgane Manfredi	Decision (unanimous)	Knock Out Championship 9	April 2, 2016	3	5:00	Cognac, France	Bantamweight debut.
