= Olivia Spiker =

German boxer (born 1981)

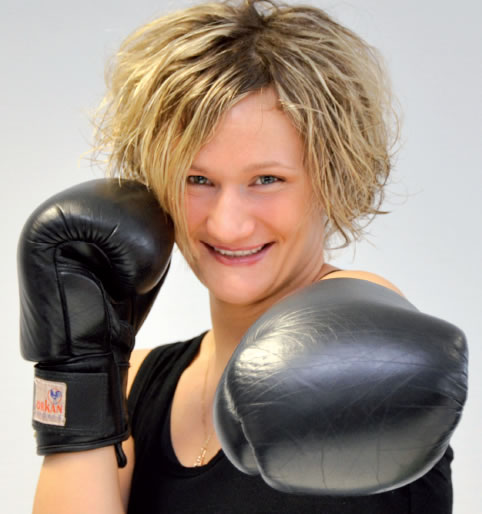

Personal information
- Nationality: (Poland) Polish (Germany) German
- Born: Olivia Luczak; November 24, 1981 (age 44) Schwelm, West Germany
- Weight: Welterweight

Boxing career
- Stance: Orthodox

Boxing record
- Total fights: 104
- Wins: 80
- Win by KO: 0
- Losses: 20
- Draws: 4
- No contests: 0
Medal record
Women's Boxing
Representing Poland
European Championships
Silver medal – second place	2007 Vejle, Denmark	66 kg

Olivia Spiker (Polish: Oliwia Łuczak; born November 24, 1981, in Schwelm as Olivia Luczak) is a Polish-German female amateur boxer. She lives in Wuppertal and studied safety engineering at University of Wuppertal.

== Career ==
Olivia Spiker is four-time West German champion, third placed at the German championships in 2004 and 2005, German champion of the year 2006 and 2008 in German middleweight and champion of the year 2007, 2009, 2010 and 2011 in the welter. In the Polish Championships in 2006 she won the Vice title and was Silesian Champion 2007 and Polish champion 2008, 2010 and 2011. She is the recipient of the honorary needle NABV and in 2007 with the sports Honorary Medal of the city of Wuppertal Award. Olivia Spiker has with the Polish women's national team at the European Championships 2007 in Vejle/ Denmark, where she was Vice-Europe champion. In 2009, she won the German University Championships in Cologne.
