= Nagehan Malkoç =

Turkish boxer/Kadın ve Aile Hizmetleri Dairesi Başkanı (born 1985)

Personal information
- Nationality: Turkish
- Born: Nagehan Gül; May 14, 1985 (age 41) Çırdak, Yeşilyurt, Tokat, Turkey
- Weight: Featherweight
Medal record
Women's Boxing
Representing Turkey
European Championships
Bronze medal – third place	2011 Rotterdam, Netherlands	57 kg
Bronze medal – third place	2009 Mykolaiv, Ukraine	57 kg
Bronze medal – third place	2007 Vejle, Denmark	57 kg
Bronze medal – third place	2005 Tønsberg, Norway	57 kg
European Union Championships
Bronze medal – third place	2008 Liverpool, England	50 kg
Gold medal – first place	2007 Lille, France	57 kg

Nagehan Malkoç, née Gül, (born May 14, 1985) is a Turkish female boxer competing in the featherweight division. She is a member of the Kocaeli Büyükşehir Belediyesi Kağıt S.K.'s boxing team.

Nagehan Gül is from Çırdak village in Yeşilyurt, Tokat. She married on June 19, 2011, to Nedim Malkoç.

== Achievements ==
- 2005 Women's European Amateur Boxing Championships Tønsberg, Norway 57 kg - Bronze
- 2007 Women's European Amateur Boxing Championships Vejle, Denmark 57 kg - Bronze
- 2007 Women's European Union Amateur Boxing Championships Lille, France 57 kg - Gold
- 2008 Women's European Union Amateur Boxing Championships Liverpool, England 57 kg - Bronze
- 2009 Women's European Amateur Boxing Championships Mykolaiv, Ukraine 57 kg - Bronze
- 2011 Turkish Prime Ministry Amateur Boxing Championships Ankara, Turkey 57 kg - Gold
- 2011 Women's European Amateur Boxing Championships Rotterdam, Netherlands 57 kg - Bronze
