= Sofya Ochigava =

Russian boxer (born 1987)

Personal information
- Nationality: Russia
- Born: 7 July 1987 (age 39) Odintsovo, Russian SFSR, Soviet Union
- Height: 1.7 m (5 ft 7 in)
- Weight: lightweight (60kg)

Boxing career
Medal record
Women's amateur boxing
Representing Russia
Olympic Games
Silver medal – second place	2012 London	Lightweight
World Championships
Gold medal – first place	2005 Podolsk	Light bantamweight
Gold medal – first place	2006 New Delhi	Bantamweight
Silver medal – second place	2012 Qinhuangdao	Lightweight
Bronze medal – third place	2008 Ningbo City	Featherweight
European Championships
Gold medal – first place	2005 Tønsberg	Light bantamweight
Gold medal – first place	2007 Vejle	Bantamweight
Gold medal – first place	2009 Mykolaiv	Featherweight
Silver medal – second place	2011 Rotterdam	Lightweight
Bronze medal – third place	2006 Warsaw	Bantamweight
Bronze medal – third place	2014 Bucharest	Lightweight

Sofya Albertovna Ochigava (Russian: Софья Альбертовна Очигава, born 7 July 1987) is a Russian female professional boxer. As an amateur, she competed for Russia in the lightweight category (under 60 kg) at the 2012 AIBA Women's World Boxing Championships and the 2012 Summer Olympics. She went head to head with Irish boxer Katie Taylor in the title match on both occasions, with Taylor emerging victorious both times. She was also three times European champion (2005, 2007, 2009), and twice World champion (2005, 2006). In 2008, she won a bronze medal at the World Championship.

Ochigava was born in the city of Odintsovo, Moscow Oblast, Soviet Union, where she is still a resident. She has Georgian origin. She started to train in kickboxing, but eventually moved to amateur boxing. She made a professional debut in 2016. There, she defeated Firuza Sharipova by a unanimous decision. A rematch with Sharipova was scheduled for 3 April 2021 at the Pyramide in Kazan, Russia, but due to lack of funding, it was ultimately cancelled.

== Professional boxing record ==
6 fights	6 wins	0 losses
By knockout	2	0
By decision	4	0

No.	Result	Record	Opponent	Type	Round, time	Date	Location	Notes
6	Win	6–0	(Belarus) Alesia Fedarystava	RTD	1 (6)	22 Feb 2022	USC Soviet Wings, Moscow, Russia	
5	Win	5–0	(Iran) Tina Akhondtabar	UD	10	25 Jun 2021	WOW Arena, Krasnaya Polyana, Sochi, Krasnodar Krai, Russia	
4	Win	4–0	(Russia) Yuliya Kutsenko	UD	10	22 Dec 2020	Pyramide, Kazan, Russia	Won vacant WBC Silver female lightweight title
3	Win	3–0	(Italy) Angela Cannizzaro	TKO	4 (10), 0:28	12 Mar 2020	Pyramide, Kazan, Russia	Won vacant IBA female lightweight title
2	Win	2–0	(Russia) Olena Medvedenko	UD	4	6 Aug 2016	Tesla Hall, Moscow, Russia	
1	Win	1–0	(Kazakhstan) Firuza Sharipova	UD	4	21 May 2016	Khodynka Ice Palace, Moscow, Russia	
