= Klara Svensson =

Swedish boxer (born 1987)

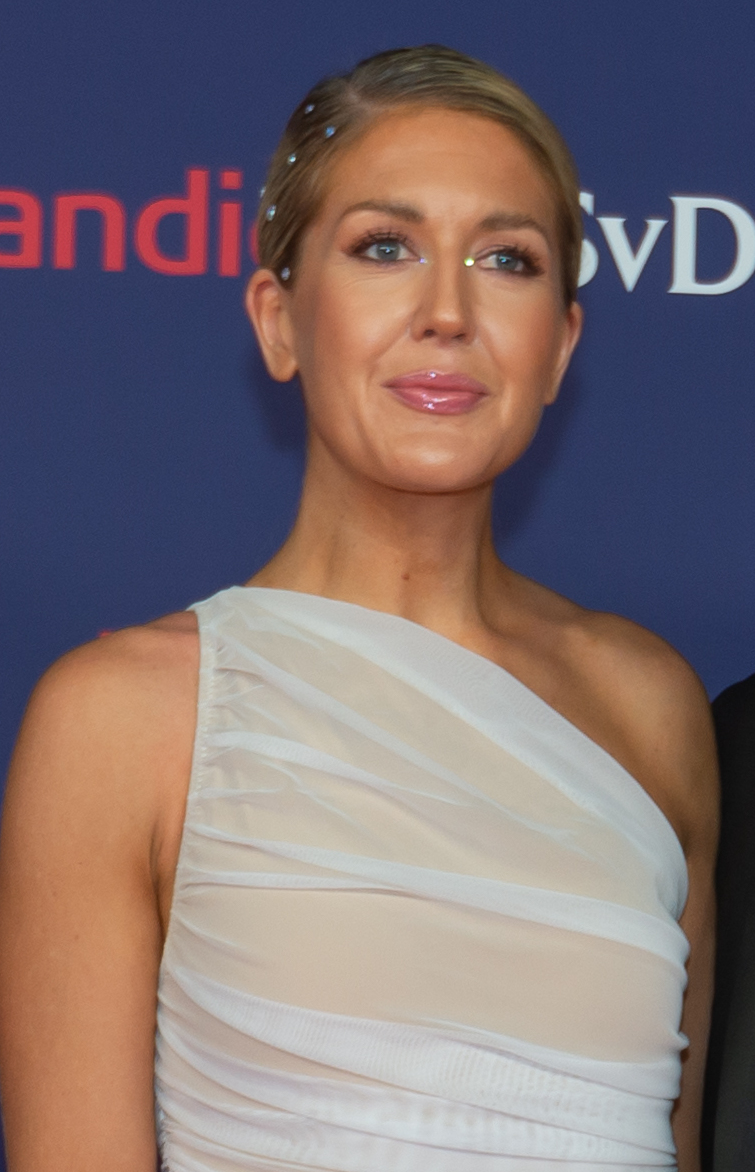

Personal information
- Nickname: Swedish Princess
- Nationality: Swedish
- Born: 15 October 1987 (age 38) Höllviken, Sweden
- Height: 1.75 m (5 ft 9 in)
- Weight: Lightweight; Light-welterweight; Welterweight

Boxing career
- Stance: Orthodox

Boxing record
- Total fights: 20
- Wins: 18
- Win by KO: 6
- Losses: 2
Medal record
Women's amateur boxing
Representing Sweden
World Championships
Silver medal – second place	2006 New Delhi	Light-welterweight
Bronze medal – third place	2008 Ningbo City	Light-welterweight
Bronze medal – third place	2010 Bridgetown	Light-welterweight
European Championships
Silver medal – second place	2007 Vejle	Light-welterweight
Bronze medal – third place	2006 Warsaw	Light-welterweight

Klara Svensson (born 15 October 1987) is a Swedish professional boxer. She held the WBC interim light-welterweight title from 2014 to 2015, the WBC interim welterweight title from September 2016 to February 2017, and challenged for the undisputed welterweight title in the same month. As an amateur she is a five-time Swedish national champion, a two-time medallist at the European Championships and a three-time medallist at the World Championships, all in the light-welterweight division.

== Early life and amateur career ==
Svensson was born and raised in Höllviken, south of Malmö. She was regarded as one of the best and most promising young Swedish boxers thanks to her successful amateur career, during which she won a medal in every World Championship event in which she participated. At the 2006 World Championships she won a silver medal, which was followed by bronze at both the 2008 and 2010 events. She also won bronze and silver at the 2006 and 2007 European Championships, respectively.

== Professional career ==
Svensson is currently signed to Sauerland Promotion, and is trained by former professional boxer Joey Gamache in Copenhagen. She made her professional debut on 11 June 2011, winning a four-round unanimous decision (UD) over Andrea Rotaru, who also debuted. In her sixth fight, on 22 February 2013, Svensson won the vacant WBC Silver super-lightweight title by defeating Floarea Lihet via ten-round UD. Svensson scored six wins in 2013, and on 13 September 2014 would win the WBC interim super-lightweight title in a UD over Marie Riederer. One defence of the title was made, in a UD against Lucia Morelli on 29 November 2014. This subsequently earned Svensson an opportunity to fight for the full WBC female super-lightweight title, held by Erica Farias. Svensson lost the bout by UD, which took place on 2 May 2015, and was also knocked down by Farias in the fifth round.

== Professional boxing record ==
20 fights	18 wins	2 losses
By knockout	6	0
By decision	12	2

No.	Result	Record	Opponent	Type	Round, time	Date	Location	Notes
20	Win	18–2	Mari Tatunashvili	TKO	4 (8) 1:29	24 Mar 2018	Inselparkhalle, Hamburg, Germany	
19	Loss	17–2	Cecilia Brækhus	UD	10	24 Feb 2017	Spektrum, Oslo, Norway	For WBA, WBC, IBF, WBO, and IBO female welterweight titles
18	Win	17–1	Mikaela Laurén	UD	10	10 Sep 2016	Hovet, Stockholm, Sweden	Won vacant WBC female interim welterweight title
17	Win	16–1	Lucia Morelli	UD	8	23 Apr 2016	Stockholm, Sweden	
16	Loss	15–1	Erica Farias	UD	10	2 May 2015	Frederiksberghallen, Frederiksberg, Denmark	For WBC female light-welterweight title
15	Win	15–0	Lucia Morelli	UD	10	29 Nov 2014	Falkoner Center, Frederiksberg, Denmark	Retained WBC female interim light-welterweight title
14	Win	14–0	Marie Riederer	UD	10	13 Sep 2014	TAP1, Copenhagen, Denmark	Won vacant WBC female interim light-welterweight title
13	Win	13–0	Veronika Hornyak	TKO	1 (8), 1:59	15 Feb 2014	MusikTeatret, Albertslund, Denmark	
12	Win	12–0	Borislava Goranova	UD	8	16 Nov 2013	MusikTeatret, Albertslund, Denmark	
11	Win	11–0	Milena Koleva	UD	8	19 Oct 2013	SYDBANK Arena, Kolding, Denmark	
10	Win	10–0	Irene Gambrah	TKO	5 (8), 1:05	15 Jun 2013	Karl-Eckel-Weg Halle, Hattersheim am Main, Germany	
9	Win	9–0	Helena Tosnerova	TKO	1 (6), 1:43	18 May 2013	Schützenverein, Horneburg, Germany	
8	Win	8–0	Rita Kenessey	KO	5 (10), 0:49	16 Mar 2013	SportForum, Bernau, Germany	
7	Win	7–0	Kremena Petkova	UD	10	22 Feb 2013	Strada Henri Coanda, Galați, Romania	Won vacant WBC Silver female light-welterweight title
6	Win	6–0	Floarea Lihet	UD	10	28 Sep 2012	Sparkassen-Arena, Göppingen, Germany	Won vacant WIBF light-welterweight title
5	Win	5–0	Zsofia Bedo	UD	10	11 May 2012	EWS Arena, Göppingen, Germany	Won vacant WBF Intercontinental female light-welterweight title
4	Win	4–0	Angel McKenzie	UD	6	11 Feb 2012	Boxsporthalle Braamkamp, Hamburg, Germany	
3	Win	3–0	Alexandra Gorog	KO	3 (4), 0:35	18 Nov 2011	Kugelbake-Halle, Cuxhaven, Germany	
2	Win	2–0	Anna Sikora	UD	4	3 Sep 2011	Kugelbake-Halle, Cuxhaven, Germany	
1	Win	1–0	Andrea Rotaru	UD	4	11 Jun 2011	Hamburger Boxverband Halle, Hamburg, Germany	

Sporting positions
Regional boxing titles
New title	WBC Silver female light-welterweight champion 22 February 2013 – 2014; Vacated	Vacant Title next held by Ewa Piątkowska
Minor world boxing titles
New title	WBF Intercontinental female light-welterweight champion 11 May 2012 – November 2012; Vacated	Vacant Title next held by Nomadithini Ndyambo
Major world boxing titles
Vacant Title last held by Molly McConnell	WIBF light-welterweight champion 28 September 2012 – October 2012; Vacated	Vacant Title next held by Marie Riederer
Vacant Title last held by Alejandra Oliveras	WBC female light-welterweight champion Interim title 13 September 2014 – 2 May 2015; Lost bid for full title	Vacant
New title	WBC female welterweight champion Interim title 10 September 2016 – 24 February 2017; Lost bid for full title	Vacant
