= Nurcan Çarkçı =

Turkish boxer

Personal information
- Nationality: Turk
- Born: Nurcan Çarkçı Göksel
- Weight: Light Middleweight

Boxing career

Nurcan Çarkçı
Medal record

Women's amateur boxing

Representing Turkey

World Championships
Bronze medal – third place	2001 Scranton	Light middleweight
Bronze medal – third place	2005 Podolsk	Light middleweight
Bronze medal – third place	2008 Ningbo City	Light middleweight

European Championships
Gold medal – first place	2003 Pécs	Light middleweight
Silver medal – second place	2004 Riccione	Light middleweight
Bronze medal – third place	2005 Tønsberg	Light middleweight
Bronze medal – third place	2007 Vejle	Light middleweight

Nurcan Çarkçı Göksel is a Turkish female boxer. Since the end of 2006, she is member of the sports club Kıraç Municipality in Istanbul, Turkey.

She was a gold medalist in the light middleweight (70 kg) division at the 2nd European Women's Boxing Championship held in Pécs, Hungary between 11 and 17 May 2003. The next year, she won a silver medal at the 3rd European Women's Boxing Championship held in Riccione, Italy between 3 and 10 October 2004. She won a bronze medal at the 3rd World Women's Boxing Championship held between 25 September and 2 October 2005 in Podolsk, Russia. At the 5th AIBA Women's World Boxing Championship held between 22 and 29 November 2008 in Ningbo City, China, Nurcan Çarkçı became a bronze medalist in her division (70 kg).
