= Amanda Coulson =

English boxer and boxing coach (born 1982)

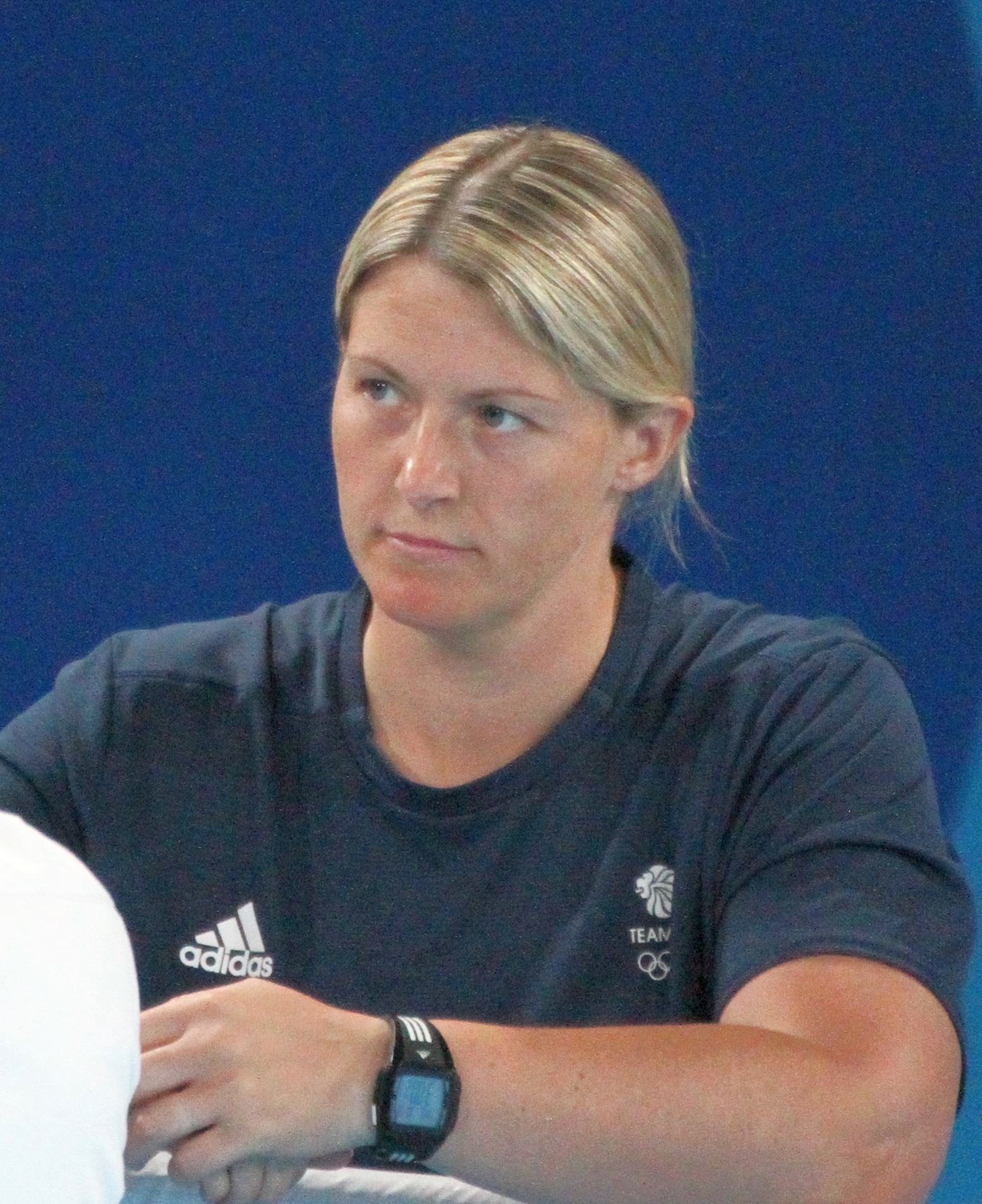
- Coulson at the 2018 Summer Youth Olympics

Personal information
- Born: 15 October 1982 (age 43) Hartlepool, County Durham, England
- Weight: 63 kg (139 lb)

Boxing career
- Weight class: Welterweight

Boxing record
- Total fights: 27
- Wins: 12
- Win by KO: 2
- Losses: 14
- Draws: 0

Amanda Coulson (born 15 October 1982) is an English boxing coach and former amateur boxer who competed from 1999 to 2012. She is the chair of the women's committee for the International Boxing Association, and is considered one of England's best women boxers, having won four national boxing championships and several international tournaments.

== Early life ==
Coulson was born on 15 October 1982 in Hartlepool. She became interested in boxing at the age of 14, after reading an article about the first British women boxers. She had difficulty finding a boxing club that would accept her, due to boxing being a male-dominated sport. She joined the Hartlepool Catholic Boys Boxing Club, which was later renamed to remove the word "Boys" from the title.

== Boxing career ==
Coulson's first fight was in 1999, after which she subsequently beat every opponent she fought in England and competed in Ireland and Sweden, winning a tournament in the latter. She then competed in the 2004 European Championships, where she faced more experienced competitors.

During her career as an amateur boxer, Coulson worked full-time as an emergency dispatcher. She has campaigned for equality for men and women in boxing. This includes having more women in other roles than fighters, such as referees and coaches.

Coulson is the chair of the women's committee for the International Boxing Association, and is considered one of England's best women boxers, having won four national boxing championships and several international tournaments.

=== Coaching ===
In 2010, Coulson competed in the World Championships in Barbados, hoping to qualify for the 2012 Summer Olympics, where women's boxing was included for the first time. After failing to qualify, Coulson decided to retire and become a coach. She was the first female coach for Great Britain when they competed in the 2018 Summer Youth Olympics, with three competitors winning gold medals.
