= Fenerbahçe S.K. (boxing) =

Turkish boxer

Fenerbahçe Boxing
- Full name: Fenerbahçe Sports Club Boxing section
- Short name: FB; Fener
- Nickname: Sarı Lacivertliler (The Yellow-Navy Blues)
- Founded: 1913
- Ground: Dereağzı Facilities
- Chairman: Aziz Yıldırım
- Head coach: Tuncay Tavukçu
- Website: Club home page

Fenerbahçe Boxing is the men's and women's boxing department of Fenerbahçe S.K., a major sports club in Istanbul, Turkey. The boxers of Fenerbahçe use the Dereağzı Facilities, belonging to the club.

In boxing, which started operating in 1913, Fenerbahçe maintains the title of the team that has won the most championships in Turkey as of the 2022–23 season. Fenerbahçe boxers, who trained in the ring at the yellow-navy club's premises in Kuşdili during the Occupation of Istanbul between 1919 and 1923, won important successes in the competitions held in Taksim against the athletes of the occupation forces. Fenerbahçe also provided 2 boxers to the 5-person Turkish national team, which was first established in November 1928 and competed in Moscow and Baku. Fenerbahçe, which has been operating as a team since 1947, has held the most distinguished place with the 18 championships it won in the Turkish Inter-Club Boxing Championship, which was organized in 1965. The yellow-navy team maintains its leading position with 41 championships it won in the Istanbul Boxing Championship. The women's team, which has been active since 1997, has also maintained its superiority since 2007. Atagün Yalçınkaya, who won the silver medal in the 2004 Summer Olympics, Yakup Kılıç, who won the bronze medal in the 2008 Summer Olympics, World Champions Mustafa Genç and Gülsüm Tatar, European Champions Nurhan Süleymanoğlu, Ramazan Palyani, Agasi Ağagüloğlu, Gülsüm Tatar and Sümeyra Kaya are Turkish boxers who have played for the Fenerbahçe Boxing Team. Cemal Kamacı and Eyüp Can, who have become European champions in professional boxing, also played for Fenerbahçe during their amateur years. Within the framework of the boxing branch activities at Fenerbahçe, between 2000 and 2004 Tae Bo, Since 1998 Kick Boxing and Muay Thai and since 2006 Wushu have also been involved, Kıymet Karpuzoğlu's World Championship in kickboxing in 2005 and Hüseyin Dündar's World Championship in wushu in 2007 were the most notable successes.

== Honours (Men) ==
=== National competitions ===
- Turkish Clubs' Boxing Championship
  - Winners (16) (record): 1987–88, 1989–90, 1994–95, 1996–1997, 1997–98, 1998–99, 2004–05, 2005–06, 2007–08, 2008–09, 2009–10, 2010–11, 2011–12, 2012–13, 2014–15, 2015–16
  - Runners-up (6): 1965–66, 1966–67, 1990–91, 1995–96, 2000–01, 2006–07
- Turkish Championship
  - Winners (21) (record): 1985–86, 1986–87, 1987–88, 1988–89, 1989–90, 1990–91, 1992–93, 1994–95, 1995–96, 1998–99, 2000–01, 2004–05, 2005–06, 2007–08, 2008–09, 2009–10, 2010–11, 2011–12, 2012–13, 2013–14, 2014–15
  - Runners-up (5): 1984–85, 1996–97, 1999–2000, 2001–02, 2006–07
- Istanbul Clubs' Boxing Championship
  - Winners (12) (shared-record): 1957–58, 1962–63, 1965–66, 1966–67, 1968–69, 1970–71, 1985–86, 1986–87, 1987–88, 1988–89, 2011–12, 2012–13
  - Runners-up (11): 1955–56, 1956–57, 1958–59, 1959–60, 1961–62, 1964–65, 1967–68, 1969–70, 1971–72, 1972–73, 1974–75
- Istanbul Individual Boxing Championship
  - Winners (26) (record): 1927–28, 1964–65, 1965–66, 1966–67, 1967–68, 1968–69, 1982–83, 1984–85, 1987–88, 1989–90, 1990–91, 1991–92, 1992–93, 1993–94, 1994–95, 1995–96, 1997–98, 1998–99, 2007–08, 2009–10, 2010–11, 2011–12, 2012–13, 2013–2014, 2014–15, 2015–16
  - Runners-up (8): 1971–72, 1972–73, 1981–82, 1983–84, 2002–03, 2005–06, 2006–07, 2008–09

== Honours (Women) ==
=== International competitions ===
- European Champions Cup
  - Runners-up (1): 1999 (Lviv, Ukraine)

=== National competitions ===
- Turkish Clubs' Boxing Championship
  - Winners (3): 2006–07, 2007–08, 2008–09

== Individual Titles of Fenerbahçe Boxers ==
- World Championships
  - Gold Medal: Mustafa Genç (1994, Juniors), Kıymet Karpuzoğlu (2001, Kickbox), Kıymet Karpuzoğlu (2005, Kickbox), Hüseyin Dündar (2008, Wushu), Gülsüm Tatar (2008), Ayşe Çağırır (2022), Buse Naz Çakıroğlu (2022), Hatice Akbaş (2022), Şennur Demir (2022)
  - Silver Medal: Fikret Güneş (1991), Enver Yılmaz (1992, Juniors), Nurhan Süleymanoğlu (1995), Agasi Ağagüloğlu (2001)
  - Bronze Medal: Fikret Güneş (1990), Akın Kuloğlu (1993), Ramaz Paliani (1999), Akın Kuloğlu (1999), Mehmet Handem (1999), Kadri Kordel (2008), Adem Kılıççı (2008), Yakup Kılınç (2008), Sema Çalışkan (2022)
- Olympics
  - Silver Medal: Malik Beyleroğlu (1996), Atagün Yalçınkaya (2004), Buse Naz Çakıroğlu (2020), Buse Naz Çakıroğlu (2024), Hatice Akbaş (2024)
  - Bronze Medal: Yakup Kılınç (2008), Esra Yıldız (2024)
- European Championships
  - Gold Medal: Nurhan Süleymanoğlu (1993), Nurhan Süleymanoğlu (1995), Ramaz Paliani (1999), Agasi Ağagüloğlu (1999), Ramaz Paliani (2000), Agasi Ağagüloğlu (2000), Ramaz Paliani (2001), Sümeyra Kaya (2006), Sümeyra Kaya (2007)
  - Silver Medal: Agasi Ağagüloğlu (2001)
  - Bronze Medal: Akın Kuloğlu (1993), Ahmet Canbakış (1993), Vahdettin İşsever (1995), Nurhan Süleymanoğlu (1999), Selim Phaliani (1999), Nurhan Süleymanoğlu (2000), Selim Phaliani (2000), Kıymet Karpuzoğlu (2000), Gülsüm Tatar (2006)
- Mediterranean Games
  - Gold Medal: Nurhan Süleymanoğlu (1993), Akın Kuloğlu (1993), Vahdettin İşsever (1995), Nurhan Süleymanoğlu (1995), Agasi Ağagüloğlu (2001), Ramaz Paliani (2001), Atagün Yalçınkaya (2005)
- Balkan Games
  - Gold Medal: Eraslan Doruk (1972), Yener Durmuş (1975), Abdülkadir Güler (1975), Yener Durmuş (1981), Bülent Angın (1982), Ali Çıtak (1985), Vahdettin İşsever (1986), Ali Çıtak (1987)

== Current squad ==
=== Technical staff ===
Boxing team officials according to the official website:

Name	Nat.	Position
Tuncay Tavukçu	(Turkey)	Head Coach
Tuncay Varol	(Turkey)	Coach
Ensar Tatar	(Turkey)	Coach
Mehmet Bilal Kalkan	(Turkey)	Coach
Metin Gemici	(Turkey)	Coach
Abdürrahim Daştan	(Turkey)	Coach
Nazım Yiğit	(Turkey)	Coach
Volkan Sarı	(Turkey)	Coach
Seyfullah Dumlupınar	(Turkey)	Coach

=== Current squads ===
==== Men's squad ====
- Oğuzhan Sağlam
- Hüseyin Dündar
- Yakup Kılıç
- Adem Kılıççı
- Kadri Kordel
- Yakup Şener
- Onur Şipal
- Önder Şipal
- Atagün Yalçınkaya

==== Women's squad ====
- Hatice Akbaş (born 2002)
- Sude Nur Aslan (born 2007)
- Ayşe Çağırır (born 1995)
- Buse Naz Çakıroğlu (born 1996)
- Sema Çalışkan (born 1996)
- Şennur Demir (born 1982)
- Şeyma Düztaş (born 2002)
- Evin Erginoğuz (born 2002)
- Büşra Işıldar (born 2002)
- Beyza Saraçoğlu
- Busenaz Sürmeneli (born 1998)
- Rabia Topuz (born 2000)
- Nurselen Yalgettekin (born 2004)
- Esra Yıldız (born 1997)

== Former members ==
- Şennur Demir (born 1982)
