= European Union Amateur Boxing Championships =

Boxing competitions

European Boxing Championships
- Status: Active
- Genre: Sports event
- Date: Midyear
- Frequency: Annual
- Inaugurated: 2003 / 2006
- Organiser: EUBC

The European Union Amateur Boxing Championships is a competition for amateur boxers from the European Union and its candidate countries (thus Turkey is a leading participant). The championships are organised by the continent's governing body, the European Boxing Confederation (EUBC). The first edition of the men's tournament took place in 2003 in Strasbourg, France and the women's in 2006 in Porto Torres, Italy. The men's tournament was held annually from 2003 to 2009 and every four years since 2014, while the women's tournament was held annually from 2006 to 2011 and every four years since 2013.

== EUBC events ==
In 2008 AIBA changed names of age groups (Junior->Youth, Cadet->Junior).

Number	Events	Inaugurated
1	European Boxing Championships	1925
2	European Union Boxing Championships	2003
3	European U22 Boxing Championships (U22)	2012
4	European Youth Boxing Championships (U19)	1970
5	European Junior Boxing Championships (U17)	1996
6	European School Boxing Championships (U15)	2003

== Editions ==
=== Men ===
Number	Year	Host	Dates	Events
1	2003	Strasbourg, France	June 10–14	11
2	2004	Madrid, Spain	June 20–24	11
3	2005	Cagliari, Italy	June 4–11	11
4	2006	Pécs, Hungary	May 23–27	11
5	2007	(Republic of Ireland) Dublin, Ireland	June 18–23	11
6	2008	Cetniewo, Poland	June 15–22	11
7	2009	Odense, Denmark	June 14–21	11
8	2014	Sofia, Bulgaria	August 8–16	10
9	2018	Valladolid, Spain	November 8–19	10

=== Women ===
Number	Year	Host	Dates	Events
1	2006	Porto Torres, Italy	June 6–12	13
2	2007	Lille, France	December 4–8	13
3	2008	Liverpool, England	August 4–8	13
4	2009	Pazardzhik, Bulgaria	June 24–28	11
5	2010	Keszthely, Hungary	August 4–7	11
6	2011	Katowice, Poland	May 31 - June 4	10
7	2013	Keszthely, Hungary	July 1 - July 6	10
8	2017	Cascia, Italy	August 4–13	10

== Medals ==
=== Men (2003-2018) ===
As of 2018 European Union Amateur Boxing Championships.

Rank	Nation	Gold	Silver	Bronze	Total
1	England	13	13	17	43
2	Ireland	13	12	9	34
3	Italy	13	7	10	30
4	France	11	6	18	35
5	Bulgaria	11	5	8	24
6	Hungary	8	8	16	32
7	Turkey	8	4	17	29
8	Germany	4	5	10	19
9	Poland	3	9	22	34
10	Romania	2	6	10	18
11	Greece	2	2	3	7
12	Sweden	2	2	1	5
13	Moldova	2	0	6	8
14	Spain	1	4	7	12
15	Lithuania	1	2	3	6
16	Slovakia	1	1	7	9
17	Estonia	1	1	2	4
18	Latvia	1	0	2	3
19	Croatia	0	3	12	15
20	Georgia	0	3	3	6
21	Netherlands	0	1	2	3
22	Denmark	0	1	1	2
22	Finland	0	1	1	2
24	Czech Republic	0	1	0	1
25	Wales	0	0	3	3
Totals (25 entries)		97	97	190	384

- pl:Mistrzostwa Unii Europejskiej w boksie

=== Women (2006-2017) ===
As 2017 Women's European Union Amateur Boxing Championships.

Rank	Nation	Gold	Silver	Bronze	Total
1	Turkey	18	9	19	46
2	France	13	7	18	38
3	Poland	10	17	18	45
4	England	10	10	10	30
5	Hungary	8	6	14	28
6	Italy	7	6	15	28
7	Ireland	6	2	6	14
8	Romania	5	6	10	21
9	Bulgaria	5	6	8	19
10	Sweden	3	2	5	10
11	Denmark	2	0	3	5
12	Germany	1	7	10	18
13	Netherlands	1	3	2	6
14	Finland	1	1	7	9
15	Switzerland	1	0	2	3
16	Belgium	0	2	4	6
17	Greece	0	2	3	5
18	Czech Republic	0	2	1	3
18	Spain	0	2	1	3
20	Serbia	0	1	0	1
21	Croatia	0	0	5	5
22	Lithuania	0	0	1	1
22	Norway	0	0	1	1
22	Scotland	0	0	1	1
22	Slovenia	0	0	1	1
22	Wales	0	0	1	1
Totals (26 entries)		91	91	166	348

- pl:Mistrzostwa Unii Europejskiej w boksie

== European Union Junior Championships ==
1.European Union Junior Championships - Rome, Italy - June 6–11, 2006

2.European Union Junior Championships - Warsaw, Poland - May 21–26, 2007

== European Union Cadet Championships ==
1.European Union Cadet Championships - Porto Torres, Italy - June 12–16, 2007

== See also ==
- World Amateur Boxing Championships
- AIBA Youth World Boxing Championships
- European Amateur Boxing Championships

== Results Database ==
- http://amateur-boxing.strefa.pl/Championships/AAAChampionships.html
- http://amateur-boxing.strefa.pl/Championships/EuropeanUnion.html
- http://amateur-boxing.strefa.pl/Championships/EuropeanUnionw.html
