= European Boxing Confederation =

European amateur boxing governing body

- Sport: Boxing
- Founded: 1970
- Headquarters: Lausanne
- President: Ioannis Filippatos

Official website
- eubcboxing.org

The European Boxing Confederation (EUBC) is the European governing body in amateur boxing. It is a member of the world governing body IBA.

== History ==
It came into existence on the adoption of its constitution on February 16, 2009, taking over the functions of the former European Amateur Boxing Association (EABA).

The president of the EUBC is Franco Falcinelli (former president of Italian Boxing Federation-Federazione Pugilistica Italiana). There are two vice-presidents and 16 executive committee members, all of whom are male, although the Confederation controls amateur boxing of both sexes.

On 29 October 2007, the executive committee of EABA removed former president Eduard Khusainov (Russia), a sworn enemy of AIBA president Wu Ching-kuo, from its association in an extraordinary EC meeting held in Chicago. The vote was 14 for and one against the removal of Khusainov after the Russia Boxing Federation notified the EABA and AIBA early in October of its decision to withdraw its support for him.

On March 4, 2022, in reaction to the 2022 Russian invasion of Ukraine, the IBA banned athletes from Russia and Belarus from competing in international competitions. In October of the same year the IBA (which is under influence of Putin-Russia) reversed that ban.

== Events ==
- European Amateur Boxing Championships
- European Union Amateur Boxing Championships
