= Katie Taylor =

Irish boxer and footballer (born 1986)

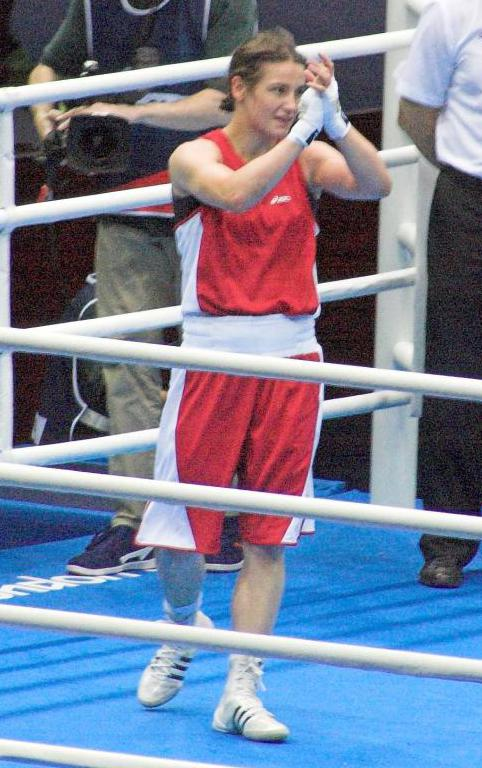
- Taylor in 2012
- Born: 2 July 1986 (age 40); Bray, County Wicklow, Ireland
- Native name: Cáit Táilliúir
- Nickname: KT; The Bray Bomber
- Citizenship: Ireland; United Kingdom; United States
- Height: 5 ft 5 in (165 cm)
- Division: Super featherweight (2016); Lightweight (2001-2024); Super lightweight (2019, 2023-2026)
- Reach: 66 in (168 cm)
- Style: Boxer-Puncher
- Stance: Orthodox
- Trainer: Ross Enamait
- Years active: 1993–2026

Professional boxing record
- Total: 27
- Wins: 26
- By knockout: 6
- Losses: 1

Amateur record
- Total: 189
- Wins: 176
- By knockout: 37
- Losses: 12
- Draws: 1

Other information
- Occupation: Retired boxer and footballer
- University: University College Dublin
- Spouse: Sean McCavanagh
- Notable relatives: Molly McCann (cousin)
- Website: katietaylor.ie
Medal record
Women's amateur boxing
Event	1st	2nd	3rd
Olympic Games	1	0	0
World Championships	5	0	1
European Championships	6	0	0
EU Championships	5	0	0
European Games	1	0	0
Total	18	0	1
Women's amateur boxing
Representing Ireland
Olympic Games
Gold medal – first place	2012 London	Lightweight
World Championships
Gold medal – first place	2006 New Delhi	Lightweight
Gold medal – first place	2008 Ningbo	Lightweight
Gold medal – first place	2010 Barbados	Lightweight
Gold medal – first place	2012 Qinhuangdao	Lightweight
Gold medal – first place	2014 Jeju	Lightweight
Bronze medal – third place	2016 Astana	Lightweight
European Games
Gold medal – first place	2015 Baku	Lightweight
European Championships
Gold medal – first place	2005 Tønsberg	Lightweight
Gold medal – first place	2006 Warsaw	Lightweight
Gold medal – first place	2007 Vejle	Lightweight
Gold medal – first place	2009 Mykolaiv	Lightweight
Gold medal – first place	2011 Rotterdam	Lightweight
Gold medal – first place	2014 Bucharest	Lightweight
EU Championships
Gold medal – first place	2008 Liverpool	Lightweight
Gold medal – first place	2009 Pazardzhik	Lightweight
Gold medal – first place	2010 Keszthely	Lightweight
Gold medal – first place	2011 Katowice	Lightweight
Gold medal – first place	2013 Keszthely	Lightweight
Association football career
- Positions: Midfielder; forward
Youth career
- 1993-1996: St Fergal's
- 1996-1999: Newtown Juniors
Senior career*
Years	Team	Apps	(Gls)
1999-2002	Lourdes Celtic	15	(7)
2002-2005	St James's Gate	9	(5)
2005-2006	St Catherine's	7	(6)
2006-2011	Peamount United	28	(15)
International career
2005-2006	Republic of Ireland U-17	4	(5)
2006-2007	Republic of Ireland U-19	7	(10)
2006–2009	Republic of Ireland	11	(6)
- * Club domestic league appearances and goals

Katie Taylor (born 2 July 1986) is an Irish former professional boxer and footballer. She is the former three-time undisputed champion, having previously been the undisputed and undefeated lineal world lightweight champion from 2019 to 2024, before moving up and becoming the undisputed and lineal world super lightweight champion on two separate occasions between 2023 and 2026. Credited with raising the profile of women's boxing in Ireland and around the world, Taylor has been described as one of Ireland's greatest ever athletes and is considered by many to be one of the greatest female boxers of all time.

Taylor first began boxing at the age of 10 in 1996 and by the age of 15 would make history when she was involved in the first ever officially sanctioned female boxing bout to take place in Ireland when she faced Alanna Nihell on 31 October 2001.

From there Taylor would go an to establish an impressive amateur career fighting 189 times between 2001 and 2016, gaining victories over future big names like Natasha Jonas, Chantelle Cameron, Eva Wahlström, Mary Romero, Érica Farías, Sofya Ochigava, Patricia Berghult, Caroline Veyre, Estelle Mossely and Mira Potkonen. Going on to win five consecutive gold medals at the Women's World Championships, gold six times at the European Championships, and gold five times at the European Union Championships. She was also pivotal in getting women’s boxing entered into the Olympics and was the flag bearer for Ireland at the 2012 London Olympics opening ceremony before going on to win the gold medal in the lightweight division.

Taylor turned professional in November of 2016 under promotor Eddie Hearn’s Matchroom Boxing. In her professional debut she secured a third round TKO victory over Poland’s Karina Kopińska, she followed that up with 3 more victories over the next 4 months before getting the opportunity to face undefeated German contender and future world champion Nina Meinke on the undercard of Anthony Joshua vs Wladimir Klitschko at Wembley Stadium in a final eliminator for the WBA lightweight title, with Taylor winning by seventh round TKO. Later that year only 11 months after making her pro debut she won her first world title by defeating three-weight world champion Anahí Ester Sánchez for the WBA lightweight title by unanimous decision, before later adding the IBF and WBO titles to her collection with wins over Victoria Bustos and Rose Volante respectively.

After her TKO victory over Volante, Taylor called out WBC champion Delfine Persoon and the two met three months later at Madison Square Garden to crown the first ever undisputed lightweight champion as well as the inaugural The Ring lightweight champion. Taylor came out victorious ending Persoon’s 8-year reign and in the process becoming only the seventh boxer in history (female or male) to hold all four major world titles in boxing—WBA, IBF, WBO and WBC—simultaneously. She repeated this feat four years later, at 37 years of age, when she defeated Chantelle Cameron in Dublin for the WBA, IBF, WBO, WBC and IBO titles, regaining the WBO title she had initially won from Christina Linardatou back in 2019.

On 5 September 2026, at the age of 40 years and 65 days, she again became undisputed champion after defeating the undefeated IBO champion Flora Pili in front of 83,000 at Croke Park, the largest crowd ever assembled for an individual female sporting event as well as being the eleventh highest attendance overall and sixth highest attendance for a post-war boxing event.

With her win over Pili, Taylor became only the fifth boxer (female or male) to become undisputed three times and became the oldest boxer to become undisputed champion, surpassing Bernard Hopkins who achieved the feat at 39 years and 247 days.

Taylor ended her career ranked as the best female boxer, pound-for-pound, by The Ring and BoxRec. She was known for her fast-paced, aggressive and exciting boxing style.

== Early life ==
Katie Taylor was born on 2 July 1986 in Bray, County Wicklow, the daughter of Irish mother Bridget (née Cranley), and English-born father, Pete Taylor. She has an older sister, Sarah, and two older brothers, Lee and Peter; the latter is a mathematics professor at Dublin City University. Her father, who was born near Leeds and grew up in Birmingham, first visited Bray to work with his own father in the amusement arcades on the seafront. After meeting and marrying Bridget, he decided to settle in Bray. In 1986, he became the Irish senior light heavyweight champion. Originally an electrician, he later became Taylor's full-time boxing coach. He also coached Adam Nolan who, like Taylor, represented Ireland at the 2012 Summer Olympics. Bridget also developed an interest in boxing and became one of the earliest female referees and judges in Ireland.

Between 1999 and 2005, Taylor attended St. Kilian's Community School in Bray. Her three older siblings had also attended the school. As well as boxing and playing association football, she played ladies' Gaelic football and camogie with her local GAA clubs, Bray Emmets and Fergal Ógs. She was a member of Bray Runners, a local athletics club, and several American colleges reportedly offered her sports scholarships while she was still studying at St Killian's. She instead chose to attend University College Dublin, known for its sports scholarship programme, which she qualified for through her Leaving Cert results. As her sporting career began to progress, she decided not to complete her studies at UCD.

Taylor is a cousin of former UFC flyweight Molly McCann.

== Amateur career ==
Taylor first began boxing in 1996, aged 10. Her father coached her and her two older brothers, Lee and Peter, at St Fergal's Boxing Club, which operated out of a former boathouse in Bray. At 15, in 2001, she fought in the first officially sanctioned female boxing match in Ireland, at the National Stadium, and defeated Alanna Audley from Belfast.

=== List of title fights ===
2005 European Amateur Boxing Championship

Taylor's first noteworthy success was at the 2005 European Amateur Championships, in Tønsberg, Norway. She won the gold medal, defeating Eva Wahlström of Finland in the final of the 60 kg lightweight class.

2005 AIBA Women's World Boxing Championship

Later in 2005, at the World Amateur Championships in Podolsk, Russia, Taylor advanced to the quarter-finals in the 60 kg weight class, where she lost to Kang Kum-Hui.

2006 European Amateur Boxing Championship

At the 2006 European Amateur Championships in Warsaw, Poland, Taylor won her second successive gold medal by stopping reigning world champion Tatiana Chalaya of Russia, also collecting the tournament's Best Boxer award.

2006 AIBA Women's World Boxing Championship

At the 2006 World Women's Boxing Championship, contested in New Delhi, India, Taylor became Ireland's first World Champion, defeating Chalaya again in the semi-final and then Erica Farias of Argentina in the 60 kg final.

2007 European Amateur Boxing Championship

In 2007, she won her third successive European Championship title in Denmark.

2008 Women's European Union Amateur Boxing Championships

2008 saw Taylor win her first European Union gold medal, contested in August in Liverpool, England. Here she defeated Cindy Orain of France.

2008 AIBA Women's World Boxing Championship

Taylor went on to claim her second World title at the 2008 AIBA Women's World Boxing Championship, contested in November at Ningbo, China. In the 60 kg weight class, she defeated China's Cheng Dong in the final match which was her 100th bout.

2009
Entering the public eye:

On 21 March 2009 at The Dublin O2, Taylor won a 27–3 win over three-time Pan-American champion Caroline Barry of the United States on the undercard of a pro WBA super bantamweight world title fight between Bernard Dunne of Ireland and Ricardo Cordoba of Panama. Speaking after the fight, Taylor, who had stopped Barry in the final of the 2006 World Championships in New Delhi, said she was stunned by the welcome she received from Irish boxing fans. She said: "I couldn't believe the reception I got – it was an amazing experience for me. I knew it was going to be a tough fight and well done to her for never backing off."

2009 Women's European Union Amateur Boxing Championships

Taylor defended her European Union title in 2009. She beat home favourite, Bulgaria's Denitsa Elisayeva, in the July tournament hosted in Pazardzhik.

2010 AIBA Women's World Boxing Championship

On 18 September 2010, Taylor went on to claim her third successive World title at the 2010 AIBA Women's World Boxing Championship, in Barbados. In the 60 kg weight class, she again defeated China's Cheng Dong in the final match. This was Taylor's 100th career win.

2011 EU Women Boxing Championships

Taylor won the gold medal at the EU Women Boxing Championships in Katowice, Poland in 2011.

2012 AIBA Women's World Boxing Championship

On 19 May 2012, Taylor won her fourth successive World title at the 2012 AIBA Women's World Boxing Championship, in Qinhuangdao China. In the 60 kg weight class, she defeated Russian southpaw Sofya Ochigava.

2012 Summer Olympics

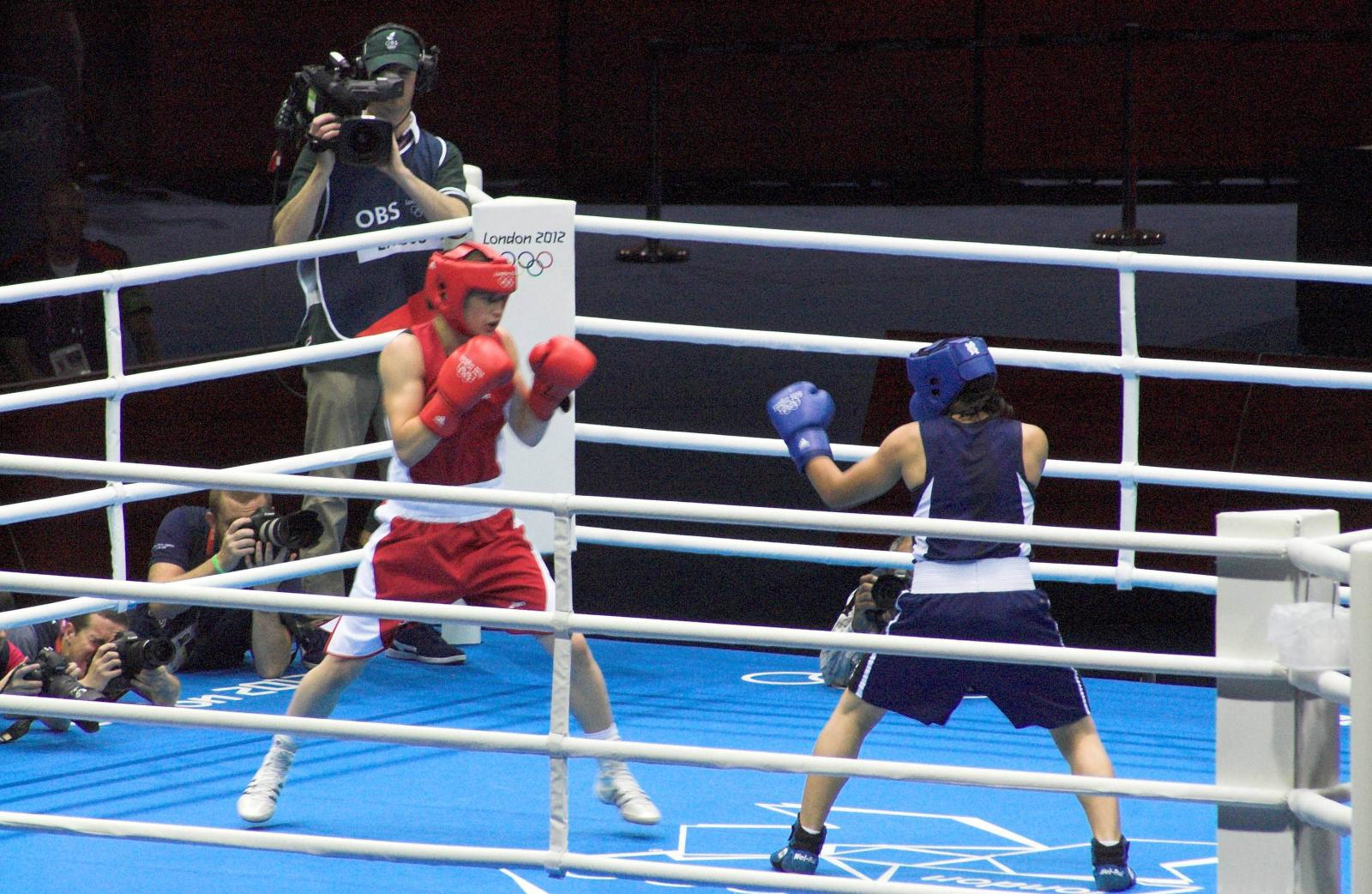
Taylor (in red) vs. Chorieva at the 2012 Olympic semi-finals

Taylor qualified for the 2012 Summer Olympics in London, the first time women's boxing had been considered for inclusion. Crowds gathered on the streets of her hometown Bray to watch her progress on giant screens erected especially for the occasion. Coddle released a single called "Katie Taylor Ireland's Boxing Legend". The song reached number 42 in the Irish Charts.

Taylor's first appearance at the 2012 Summer Olympics came on 6 August, after a first round bye. She achieved an impressive 26–15 victory (R1: 5–2, R2: 5–5, R3: 9–4, R4: 7–4) over Great Britain's Natasha Jonas, booking her place in the semi-final and guaranteeing her, at least, an Olympic bronze medal. Fans of Taylor produced record noise levels at the Olympics.

In the semi-final on 8 August 2012, she proved far too good for Tajikistan's Mavzuna Chorieva and won in a 17–9 victory (R1: 3–1, R2: 4–2, R3: 6–3, R4: 4–3), booking her place in the final and guaranteeing her, at least, an Olympic silver medal.

Taylor defeated Russia's Sofya Ochigava in the final bout by 10–8 (R1: 2–2, R2: 1–2, R3: 4–1, R4: 3–3) on 9 August 2012, winning an Olympic gold medal, and becoming the first ever Olympic female lightweight champion.

On her return to Dublin with the rest of the Olympic squad she got into the cockpit of the plane and leaned out the window waving an Irish flag.

2014 AIBA Women's World Boxing Championships

On 24 November 2014, Taylor won her fifth straight lightweight title in South Korea at the 2014 AIBA Women's World Boxing Championships, defeating Yana Alekseevna of Azerbaijan. The final scoreline was 40–36, 39–37, and 39–37 in her favour.

2015 European Games

On 27 June 2015, Taylor won the lightweight title in Azerbaijan at the inaugural European Games, defeating Estelle Mossely of France. The final scoreline was 40–36, 40–36, and 39–37 in her favour.

2016 AIBA Women's World Boxing Championships

On 24 May 2016, Taylor qualified for the 2016 Summer Olympics after defeating Victoria Torres in the quarter-finals of the lightweight division at the 2016 AIBA Women's World Boxing Championships. Two days later, Taylor lost to Estelle Mossely in the semi-finals which ended her quest for a sixth World title in a row.

2016 Summer Olympics

On 15 August 2016, Taylor lost 2–1 in the quarter-finals to Mira Potkonen of Finland and did not advance.

== Professional career ==
=== Debut and early career ===
After a successful 15 year amateur career spanning 189 fights Taylor reached out to promoter Eddie Hearn and soon after officially sign with Matchroom Boxing becoming the first female boxer to sign with the promotion.

Taylor made her professional debut on 26 November 2016, scoring a third-round technical knockout (TKO) over Karina Kopińska at the Wembley Arena in London.

In her second professional bout she faced Viviane Obenauf on 10 December 2016 at the Manchester Arena, Manchester. The fight was televised live on Sky Sports Box Office as part of the undercard for the Anthony Joshua vs. Éric Molina heavyweight world title fight. In a bout which saw Taylor score a knockdown in the second round after Obenauf appeared to slip, and the latter suffer a cut to her left eye following an apparent clash of heads, Taylor won by a shutout six-round points decision (PTS) with the referee scoring the bout 60–53.

She scored two more wins in March 2017—against Monica Gentili via fifth-round TKO and Milena Koliva via PTS over eight rounds—before facing Nina Meinke for the vacant WBA International female lightweight title on 29 April 2017 at the Wembley Stadium. The bout served as a final eliminator for the WBA female lightweight title and was televised live on Sky Sports Box Office as part of the undercard for the Anthony Joshua vs. Wladimir Klitschko world title fight. Taylor controlled the contest from the opening bell with her speed and combination punches. Meinke suffered a cut in the fifth round from an accidental clash of heads. With a badly swollen right eye, and after being on the receiving end of a flurry of punches, referee Howard Foster called a halt to the contest in the seventh round to save Meinke from further punishment, handing Taylor a TKO victory.

Three months later Taylor made her American debut when she faced Jasmine Clarkson at the Barclays Center in New York City. Taylor secured a third-round stoppage victory in the fight via corner retirement (RTD), taking Taylor's record to 6–0.

=== WBA lightweight champion ===
==== Taylor vs. Sánchez ====
Following her win over Clarkson in July Taylor finally got her shot to win her first world title as she faced former two-weight world champion Anahí Ester Sánchez for the vacant WBA female lightweight title on 28 October 2017 at the Principality Stadium in Cardiff, Wales. Sánchez was set to defend the title on the night, however, she failed to make weight for the fight and was subsequently stripped by the WBA, with the title on the line for Taylor only. The bout was televised live on Sky Sports Box Office as part of the undercard for Anthony Joshua vs. Carlos Takam. After controlling the first round with her speed and power, Taylor dropped the former champion to the canvas with a body shot in the second. Sánchez was hurt again in the next round after a right hand from Taylor caused her to stagger. Sánchez had some success in the fifth, landing right hands to force Taylor onto the back foot. Taylor regained control for the rest of the fight to secure a wide unanimous decision (UD) victory, with all three judges scoring the bout 99–90 to hand Taylor her first world title.

==== Taylor vs. McCaskill ====
The first defence of her title came against future undisputed welterweight champion Jessica McCaskill on 13 December at the York Hall in London. McCaskill had spent months talking trash about Taylor and now had the chance to back it up in the ring. After a closely contested first round, Taylor began to take control with her speed and power before McCaskill found momentary success in the sixth round. Taylor received a controversial point deduction in the seventh, but took back control keeping McCaskill at a distance and fighting at range for the next three rounds to secure a UD victory. One judge scored the bout 98–91 and the other two scored it 97–92.

=== WBA & IBF lightweight champion ===
==== Taylor vs. Bustos ====
A unification bout against reigning IBF female lightweight champion Victoria Bustos took place on 28 April 2018 at the Barclays Center in New York City. Taylor controlled the majority of the fight with her speed from a distance, only encountering difficulty in rounds seven and eight after engaging Bustos at close range. Taylor secured the win with a wide UD to add the IBF title to her growing collection, with two judges scoring the bout 99–91 and the third scoring it 98–92.

=== Title defences ===
After defeating Bustos, Taylor made three more successful defences of her titles in 2018, taking her record to 12–0. She started with a dominant win over Kimberly Connor via third-round TKO in July. After that she defeated former WBO female featherweight champion Cindy Serrano by UD in October; To close out 2018 Taylor faced 22-0 WBC female super-featherweight champion Eva Wahlström in December at Madison Square Garden on the undercard of Canelo Álvarez vs. Rocky Fielding. Taylor won 100–90 on all three judges scorecards. After the fight Taylor was asked who she might want to fight next; she named Delfine Persoon, Rose Volante and Amanda Serrano.

=== Unified champion ===
==== Taylor vs. Volante ====
Taylor's first fight of 2019 was another unification bout, facing WBO female lightweight champion Rose Volante on 15 March at the Liacouras Center in Philadelphia, Pennsylvania. Taylor started the fight strong, using her combination punching and movement to take control, dropping Volante to the canvas with a right hand in the opening round. The second round saw Taylor stay behind the jab, keeping her opponent at range as Volante attempted to close the distance and fight at close quarters. Volante switched tactics in the third round, staying in the centre of the ring and waiting for Taylor to press the action. Taylor obliged, but the Irish champion's footwork allowed her to get in-and-out before Volante could land any meaningful punches. After much of the same in the fourth, Taylor began to pile on the pressure in the fifth, switching her attacks from head to body to find an opening with a powerful body shot to hurt Volante. Round six saw Taylor pierce the guard of Volante with straight punches, leaving her opponent with a bloodied nose. Volante had moments of success in the seventh round with heavy punches to the body of Taylor, before the Irish woman resumed her attacks to regain control. Taylor continued her success in the eighth, landing an overhand right followed by a rapid six-punch combination. After Volante was on the receiving end of a flurry of punches, and with a cut over her nose which appeared to be the result of a clash of heads, referee Benjy Esteves stepped in and called a halt to the contest to hand Taylor a ninth-round TKO victory and her third world title.

In the post-fight interview, Taylor declared her intentions of becoming the undisputed female lightweight champion, saying; "Now we can start talking about that fight, Persoon. That name's been coming up over the last two years. I've got the three belts, she's got the WBC belt, so we have to get that fight on next."

=== Undisputed champion ===
==== Taylor vs. Persoon I ====
In December 2018, Irish journalist Evanne Ní Chuilinn stated that Taylor accused Delfine Persoon of turning down a "life-changing" amount of money to fight her. Later Persoon claimed to have offered $100,000 to Taylor for a fight. Taylor's manager stated that Taylor wouldn't even get out of bed for this sum. On 15 April 2019, Taylor and Persoon agreed to a lightweight title unification bout, to take place on 1 June at Madison Square Garden as undercard for the Anthony Joshua vs. Andy Ruiz Jr. heavyweight title fight. In addition to all four sanctioning body's titles being on the line, The Ring magazine belt was also at stake.

Persoon's management labelled Taylor's team "totally disrespectful" and claimed "psychological warfare" after a series of demands late in the fight week. This included a claim of forcing Persoon to switch hotels on the grounds that Taylor was staying in the same hotel, and demands for an additional blood test and to prove Persoon has exercise asthma. Taylor's team denied expelling Persoon's team from the hotel, but claimed that there was a clause in the contract allowing them to do so which Persoon's manager should have been aware of. Although, in a different interview Taylor's team stated it was not done by them, but by the organizers and that they had no idea about this forced move out of the hotel. Taylor's team accused Persoon's manager of purposefully attempting to stir controversy by booking his fighter into the hotel Taylor was staying at.

From the opening bell, Taylor came under relentless pressure from Persoon, forcing the Irish champion to fight off the back foot and rely on counter punching. After having success in the first round, Taylor began to have difficulties with Persoon's pressure in the second and third, with the Belgian champion employing roughhouse tactics in the clinch. Taylor suffered a cut to her forehead in the fourth round. In the fifth, with Taylor ahead on all three judges' scorecards, she spent the majority of the round with her back against the ropes, still engaging with Persoon and having success. Taylor found more success in the sixth, scoring with counter punches while making Persoon miss as the Belgian began to tire. The tables turned in the eighth as Taylor also looked to be tiring, with the highlight of the round being a solid right hand from Persoon to stop Taylor in her tracks. The Irish champion rallied back in the ninth to land her trademark rapid-fire combinations. The tenth and final round was a back-and-forth affair as both fighters traded punches to try and close the show as the stronger fighter. After the final bell rang Taylor secured the win via majority decision (MD), with two judges scoring the bout in favour of Taylor at 96–94 while the third judge scored it a draw at 95–95, crowning Taylor the first undisputed female lightweight champion. According to CompuBox stats, Taylor landed 103 of 410 (25.1%) punches, while Persoon landed 116 of 586 (19.8%).

Controversy ensued regarding the decision, with some ringside media outlets and boxers feeling Persoon did enough to get the win. Former two-weight world champion Carl Frampton said, "In my opinion, the judges have got it wrong", and described the decision as "disgraceful". Former two-weight world champion David Haye said, "That is not the sight you want to see where someone has given everything in the gym but they do not get the decision because of the political power. Delfine Persoon is going to be heartbroken by that." ESPN's unofficial scorecard also had Persoon winning by a small margin. DAZN commentator Brian Kenny also thought Persoon had won, but explained that the fight was close and did not dispute the judges' decision. Michael Woods, writing for The Ring magazine, argued the decision "was no robbery".

=== Two-weight world champion ===
==== Taylor vs. Linardatou ====
For her next fight, Taylor elected to move up in weight, facing WBO female junior-welterweight champion Christina Linardatou on 2 November 2019 at the Manchester Arena. The champion started the fight as the aggressor, forcing Taylor to fight off the back foot. The Irish challenger found success at the end of the round with two solid right hands as the bell rang. Taylor started to find her rhythm in the second round, scoring punches while using her fast footwork to make her opponent miss. The third round saw more of the same with Taylor staying behind the jab and landing left hooks. Linardatou found success in the fourth and fifth rounds, landing multiple right hands and leaving Taylor with swelling above her right eye. Taylor began regaining control in the sixth, using her footwork and landing her signature rapid combinations. Round eight saw Taylor plant her feet and trade punches, landing a combination of power punches before taking a solid right hand from the champion that stopped Taylor in her tracks. After critical comments from her corner for taking too many punches in the eighth round, Taylor got back to her boxing for the next two rounds, coasting to a UD victory with the scorecards reading 97–93, 97–93, and 96–94. With the win Taylor became only the third boxer from Ireland, after Steve Collins and Carl Frampton, to capture world titles in two weight divisions.

=== Undisputed lightweight title defences ===
==== Taylor vs. Persoon II ====
Taylor was scheduled to defend her lightweight titles against seven-division world champion Amanda Serrano on 2 May 2020 at the Manchester Arena. However, due to the COVID-19 pandemic the bout was postponed and rescheduled to 4 July, with the venue changing to the Matchroom Sport headquarters in Brentwood, Essex. The bout was once again postponed, with a new proposed date of 22 August. After negotiations began to break down, Taylor's promoter, Eddie Hearn, revealed he was in talks with Delfine Persoon's team to secure a rematch for the 22 August date. On 9 July, it was confirmed that the Taylor vs. Persoon rematch would take place on 22 August at the Matchroom Sport headquarters in Brentwood, Essex, airing live on Sky Sports Box Office as part of the undercard for Dillian Whyte vs. Alexander Povetkin.

The match went to Taylor by unanimous points decision, 98–93, 96–94, 96–94, and Persoon conceded that Taylor had clearly won, and deserved to retain the slate of titles held - "she is so good. I have no problem with this result". Two-time world heavyweight champion Anthony Joshua described it as "another fantastic fight between these two great boxers".

==== Taylor vs. Gutierrez ====
Taylor defended her titles on 14 November 2020 at The SSE Arena in London against Miriam Gutiérrez. Taylor dropped her opponent to the canvas with a left hook at the end of the fourth round en route to a unanimous decision victory, with the judges' scorecards reading 100–89, 100–90, and 99–91. During the post-fight interview, Eddie Hearn listed potential opponents for Taylor's next fight, which included Amanda Serrano, a rematch with undisputed welterweight champion Jessica McCaskill, the former undisputed welterweight champion Cecilia Braekhus, or a crossover fight with MMA fighter Cris Cyborg.

==== Taylor vs. Jonas ====
Taylor was next scheduled to defend her undisputed lightweight titles at the AO Arena against future two-weight champion Natasha Jonas, an opponent she had previously defeated in the quarter-finals at the 2012 London Olympics. The bout took place on 1 May 2021 on the undercard of Derek Chisora vs. Joseph Parker. Following a highly competitive fight, Taylor won by a narrow unanimous decision (96–94, 95–94, 95–94) to retain her undisputed lightweight titles for the third time. This was the final Taylor fight to be broadcast live on Sky Sports.

==== Taylor vs. Han ====
Taylor's next defence was against Jennifer Han in front of a crowd of 20,000 at the Headingley Rugby League Stadium in Leeds, England. Taylor won decisively on all three scorecards (100–89) after flooring Han with a short right hook in the eighth round to retain her lightweight titles.

During her post-fight interview, Taylor said "I want the megafights and to be involved in the biggest fights out there. I'm confident I will end my career as unbeaten and undisputed world champion."

==== Taylor vs. Sharipova ====
Taylor was next announced to be fighting Firuza Sharipova on 11 December 2021 at the M&S Bank Arena, Liverpool. Taylor defeated Sharipova via unanimous decision (98–92, 97–92, 96–93) to successfully defend her undisputed lightweight titles for the fifth time.

==== Taylor vs. Serrano ====
Taylor defended her undisputed lightweight titles against seven-division world champion Amanda Serrano on 30 April 2022 at Madison Square Garden. The fight was the first women's boxing match to headline Madison Square Garden, and was described as the 'biggest women's fight of all time' in the build up. Despite being badly hurt in the fifth round, Taylor rallied to retain her titles with a split decision victory (94–96, 97–93, and 96–93). The bout was named Fight of the Year by Sports Illustrated and Event of the Year by The Ring.

==== Taylor vs. Carabajal ====
Taylor successfully defended her undisputed lightweight titles for the seventh and final time against undefeated Argentine boxer, Karen Carabajal, on 29 October 2022 at the OVO Arena, Wembley winning by unanimous decision (100–91, 98–92, and 99–91). In her post-fight interview, Taylor called for her next fight to be held in the 82,300 capacity Croke Park stadium in Dublin.

=== Return to super-lightweight ===
==== Taylor vs. Cameron ====
Taylor was scheduled to defend her lightweight titles in a rematch against Amanda Serrano on 20 May in Dublin, following Serrano becoming the undisputed featherweight champion with a victory over Erika Cruz. However, in late February 2023 it was announced that Serrano had suffered an injury and the bout would not take place. On 2 March, Taylor took to Instagram and publicly challenged the undisputed super-lightweight champion Chantelle Cameron to fill the vacancy left by Serrano. Cameron accepted, and the bout was subsequently announced by Eddie Hearn on 11 March to be taking place at the 3Arena for Cameron's undisputed super-lightweight titles. The bout was Taylor's first professional fight in her home country of Ireland and saw her attempt to become a two-weight undisputed world champion. The fight went the distance but Taylor lost by majority decision, 94–96, 94–96, 95–95.

==== Taylor vs. Cameron II ====
Following her first professional loss, Taylor invoked the rematch clause in her contract to secure a second fight with Cameron on 25 November 2023, again at the 3Arena. Despite going down in the first round, which was ultimately ruled as a slip, Taylor emerged victorious via a majority decision (95–95, 98–92, 96–94) after 10 rounds to hand Cameron her first professional loss. In doing so, she became the undisputed super-lightweight champion and a two-weight undisputed champion. The win also made Taylor the second female boxer, and the first Irish female boxer, to be an undisputed champion in two weight classes; the first was the American female boxer Claressa Shields. Post-fight, Taylor stated a willingness to fight Cameron again, preferably at Croke Park.

==== Taylor vs. Serrano II ====
Taylor was scheduled to make the first defense of her undisputed super lightweight title in a rescheduled rematch against Amanda Serrano at AT&T Stadium in Arlington, Texas. The bout was to serve as the co-main event to Jake Paul vs. Mike Tyson, originally on 20 July 2024. However, due to Mike Tyson having an ulcer flare up, the event was postponed and took place at the same stadium on 15 November 2024. Following another gruelling fight, Taylor retained her titles by unanimous decision, winning 95–94 on all three scorecards. Netflix reported that the bout had an "average minute audience" (AMA) of 47 million in the United States, making it the most-watched women's professional sporting event in U.S. history.

=== Trilogy ===
==== Taylor vs. Serrano III ====
A trilogy fight against Amanda Serrano at Madison Square Garden in New York occurred on 11 July 2025. The bout headlined the first all-women's boxing card at Madison Square Garden, live on Netflix.

Taylor successfully defended her undisputed super lightweight title by majority decision (95–95, 97–93, 97–93) closing out the epic trilogy and going 3–0 against her longtime rival to cement herself as the No.1 P4P fighter.

=== Three-times undisputed & retirement ===
==== Taylor vs. Pili ====
On 11 July 2025, after beating Amanda Serrano for the third and final time, Taylor at 39 years of age was considering retirement, with her promoter Eddie Hearn claiming that the only thing he could see making her reconsider retiring would be her finally getting to headline Croke Park, something that had been discussed for years but had never materialised.

On 17 September 2025, after Taylor had made the decision to take some time away from boxing to consider her future, the WBC made her champion in recess. The WBC also named her Champion Emeritus. Interim WBC champion Chantelle Cameron, who Taylor had previously beaten to become undisputed champion in 2023, was elevated to full champion status. Cameron was ordered to fight former world champion and long time rival Sandy Ryan for the WBC title. Cameron refused to fight Ryan and instead, only a month after being elevated to full champion, vacated the title. Ryan was instead ordered to fight Karla Ramos Zamora for the vacant WBC title on 21 February 2026. Despite suffering a broken hand early in the fight, Ryan pulled off the win via majority decision. After the fight, Ryan declared an interest in an undisputed title fight against Taylor.

Ryan vacated the title in June 2026 without making any defences, after announcing she was pregnant, and the WBC designated her as champion in recess. On 3 June 2026, the WBC ordered a fight for the vacant title between Taylor and undefeated 12–0 IBO female super-lightweight champion, Flora Pili, who was ranked No.1 by both the WBC and IBF. On 5 June 2026, at a Matchroom Boxing press conference, it was announced that Taylor vs Pili would happen on 5 September 2026 at Croke Park, with Taylor defending her IBF, WBO and WBA titles and the vacant WBC title also being on the line.

Taylor beat Pili via unanimous decision with the three judges scoring the fight (100–90, 100–90, 99–91) in front of 83,000 fans before leaving her gloves and titles in the ring as she retired from the sport after 30 years.

== Association football ==
=== Club career ===
As a schoolgirl, Taylor played association football for St Fergal's and Newtown Juniors in the Wicklow and District Schoolboys League and Ballyfermot United in the Dublin and District Schoolboys league. Taylor played in teams with boys. She also represented the league in the Kennedy Cup, an inter–league competition, and won the league's Player of the Year award. At senior club level, Taylor played in the Dublin Women's Soccer League for Lourdes Celtic, St James's Gate, St Catherine's and Peamount United. Taylor played for St James's Gate in the 2003 DWSL Premier Cup final against Dundalk City. Gate lost 3–2 after extra time. Taylor also played for Peamount United in the 2005 FAI Women's Cup final. However Peamount lost 1–0 to Dundalk City. In 2009, Taylor was a member of the St Catherine's squad that reached the FAI Women's Cup final. However, her boxing commitments saw her miss out on the final itself. In 2010, together with Nicola Sinnott, Áine O'Gorman, Sara Lawlor and Louise Quinn, Taylor was a member of the Peamount United squad that won a treble, winning the Dublin Women's Soccer League, the DWSL Premier Cup and the FAI Women's Cup.

=== International ===
Taylor represented the Republic of Ireland women's national football team at under-17, under-19 and senior levels. She was 14 when she played for the under-17s and 15 when she started playing for the under-19s. According to Taylor, her boxing training helped her football career because it made her physically strong enough to bridge the age gaps. On 25 September 2003, Taylor scored four goals for the Republic of Ireland under-19s in a 2004 UEFA Women's Under-19 Championship qualifier against Macedonia.

Between 2006 and 2009, Taylor made 11 appearances and scored 2 goals for the senior team. She made her senior international debut on 22 April 2006 against Switzerland in a 2007 FIFA Women's World Cup qualifier at Richmond Park. The Republic of Ireland won 2–0. In 2006 Taylor also played for the Republic of Ireland in a prestige away friendly against the United States. Taylor scored her first senior international goal on 1 April 2007 in a UEFA Women's Euro 2009 qualifier against Hungary at Tolka Park. Taylor's goal helped the Republic of Ireland win 2–1. She scored her second goal in the same qualifying campaign in a 4–1 defeat against in Italy on 16 February 2008. She was also sent off in the same game. She made her final international appearance on 24 September 2009 when she came on as substitute in a 2011 FIFA Women's World Cup qualifier against Kazakhstan.

== Personal life ==
Taylor and her family attend St. Mark's Church in Dublin, which is part of the Assemblies of God, the world's largest Pentecostal denomination.

In 2002, at the age of 15, Taylor appeared on RTÉ's Sport Stream and discussed her aim of one day appearing at the Olympics. She was a coach on RTÉ's Charity Lords of the Ring in 2009, and appeared in a Lucozade Sport advertisement in 2011 alongside English rapper Tinie Tempah and American musician Travis Barker. She became the brand ambassador for Its4women, an online insurance company aimed at young women, in 2016. She appeared in advertisements for the company on television and YouTube.

My Olympic Dream, Taylor's "illustrated memoir" written with assistance from The Irish Times sports writer Johnny Watterson, was published by Simon & Schuster in 2012. In 2018, the documentary Katie was released, chronicling her early life and her route to her first title shot. She has a fondness for the Irish language and once appeared on Bernard Dunne's show Bród Club to promote it.

On 15 June 2018, Taylor's father, Pete, was a victim in the Bray boxing club shooting. He was shot in the chest and arm but survived.

In 2025, Taylor appeared with her new husband, American real-estate agent Sean McCavanagh. As of November 2025, they live in Connecticut, where Taylor is stepmother to McCavanagh's five children from his late wife.

== Professional boxing record ==
27 fights	26 wins	1 loss
By knockout	6	0
By decision	20	1

No.	Result	Record	Opponent	Type	Round, time	Date	Age	Location	Notes
27	Win	26–1	Flora Pili	UD	10	5 September 2026	40 years, 65 days	Croke Park, Dublin, Ireland	Retained WBA, IBF, WBO, and The Ring super lightweight titles; Won IBO and vacant WBC super lightweight titles
26	Win	25–1	Amanda Serrano	MD	10	11 July 2025	39 years, 9 days	Madison Square Garden, New York City, New York, US	Retained WBA, WBC, IBF, WBO, IBO, and The Ring super lightweight titles
25	Win	24–1	Amanda Serrano	UD	10	15 November 2024	38 years, 136 days	AT&T Stadium, Arlington, Texas, US	Retained WBA, WBC, IBF, WBO, IBO, and The Ring super lightweight titles
24	Win	23–1	Chantelle Cameron	MD	10	25 November 2023	37 years, 146 days	3Arena, Dublin, Ireland	Won WBA, WBC, IBF, WBO, IBO, and The Ring super lightweight titles
23	Loss	22–1	Chantelle Cameron	MD	10	20 May 2023	36 years, 322 days	3Arena, Dublin, Ireland	For WBA, WBC, IBF, WBO, IBO, and The Ring super lightweight titles
22	Win	22–0	Karen Elizabeth Carabajal	UD	10	29 October 2022	36 years, 150 days	Wembley Arena, London, England	Retained WBA, WBC, IBF, WBO and The Ring lightweight titles
21	Win	21–0	Amanda Serrano	SD	10	30 April 2022	35 years, 302 days	Madison Square Garden, New York City, New York, US	Retained WBA, WBC, IBF, WBO and The Ring lightweight titles
20	Win	20–0	Firuza Sharipova	UD	10	11 December 2021	35 years, 162 days	Liverpool Arena, Liverpool, England	Retained WBA, WBC, IBF, WBO and The Ring lightweight titles
19	Win	19–0	Jennifer Han	UD	10	4 September 2021	35 years, 64 days	Headingley Stadium, Leeds, England	Retained WBA, WBC, IBF, WBO and The Ring lightweight titles
18	Win	18–0	Natasha Jonas	UD	10	1 May 2021	34 years, 303 days	Manchester Arena, Manchester, England	Retained WBA, WBC, IBF, WBO and The Ring lightweight titles
17	Win	17–0	Miriam Gutiérrez	UD	10	14 November 2020	34 years, 135 days	Wembley Arena, London, England	Retained WBA, WBC, IBF, WBO and The Ring lightweight titles
16	Win	16–0	Delfine Persoon	UD	10	22 August 2020	34 years, 51 days	Matchroom Fight Camp, Brentwood, Essex, England	Retained WBA, WBC, IBF, WBO and The Ring lightweight titles
15	Win	15–0	Christina Linardatou	UD	10	2 November 2019	33 years, 123 days	Manchester Arena, Manchester, England	Won WBO super lightweight title
14	Win	14–0	Delfine Persoon	MD	10	1 June 2019	32 years, 334 days	Madison Square Garden, New York City, New York, US	Retained WBA, IBF, and WBO lightweight titles; Won WBC and inaugural The Ring lightweight titles
13	Win	13–0	Rose Volante	TKO	9 (10), 1:40	15 March 2019	32 years, 256 days	Liacouras Center, Philadelphia, Pennsylvania, US	Retained WBA and IBF lightweight titles; Won WBO lightweight title
12	Win	12–0	Eva Wahlström	UD	10	15 December 2018	32 years, 166 days	Madison Square Garden, New York City, New York, US	Retained WBA and IBF lightweight titles
11	Win	11–0	Cindy Serrano	UD	10	20 October 2018	32 years, 110 days	TD Garden, Boston, Massachusetts, US	Retained WBA and IBF lightweight titles
10	Win	10–0	Kimberly Connor	TKO	3 (10), 1:43	28 July 2018	32 years, 26 days	The O2 Arena, London, England	Retained WBA and IBF lightweight titles
9	Win	9–0	Victoria Bustos	UD	10	28 April 2018	31 years, 300 days	Barclays Center, New York City, New York, US	Retained WBA lightweight title; Won IBF lightweight title
8	Win	8–0	Jessica McCaskill	UD	10	13 December 2017	31 years, 164 days	York Hall, London, England	Retained WBA lightweight title
7	Win	7–0	Anahí Ester Sánchez	UD	10	28 October 2017	31 years, 118 days	Millennium Stadium, Cardiff, Wales	Won WBA lightweight title
6	Win	6–0	Jasmine Clarkson	RTD	3 (8), 2:00	29 July 2017	31 years, 27 days	Barclays Center, New York City, New York, US	
5	Win	5–0	Nina Meinke	TKO	7 (10), 0:57	29 April 2017	30 years, 301 days	Wembley Stadium, London, England	Won vacant WBA Inter-Continental lightweight title
4	Win	4–0	Milena Koleva	PTS	8	25 March 2017	30 years, 266 days	Manchester Arena, Manchester, England	
3	Win	3–0	Monica Gentili	TKO	5 (6), 1:31	4 March 2017	30 years, 245 days	The O2 Arena, London, England	
2	Win	2–0	Viviane Obenauf	PTS	6	10 December 2016	30 years, 161 days	Manchester Arena, Manchester, England	
1	Win	1–0	Karina Kopińska	TKO	3 (6), 0:58	26 November 2016	30 years, 147 days	Wembley Arena, London, England	

== Amateur boxing record ==
189 fights	176 wins	12 losses
By knockout	37	0
By decision	138	12
By disqualification	1	0
Draws	1	

No.	Result	Record	Opponent	Type	Round, time	Date	Age	Location	Notes
189	Loss	176–12-1	Mira Potkonen	SD	4	15 August 2016	30 years, 44 days	Rio de Janeiro, Brazil	Rio 2016 Olympic Games Women`s 60 kg Quarterfinal
188	Loss	176–11-1	Estelle Mossely	SD	4	26 May 2016	29 years, 329 days	Astana, Kazakhstan	2016 AIBA Women's World Championships Semi-Final
187	Win	176–10-1	Victoria Torres Canul	UD	4	24 May 2016	29 years, 327 days	Astana, Kazakhstan	2016 AIBA Women's World Championships Quarter-Final
186	Win	175–10-1	Dayana Sánchez	UD	4	23 May 2016	29 years, 326 days	Astana, Kazakhstan	2016 AIBA Women's World Championships Preliminaries
185	Win	174–10-1	Agnes Alexiusson	UD	4	21 May 2016	29 years, 324 days	Astana, Kazakhstan	2016 AIBA Women's World Championships Preliminaries
184	Win	173–10-1	Svetlana Kamenova Staneva	UD	4	17 April 2016	29 years, 290 days	Samsun, Turkey	2016 European Olympic Qualifier Third-Place Box-Off
183	Loss	172–10-1	Yana Alekseevna	UD	4	15 April 2016	29 years, 288 days	Samsun, Turkey	2016 European Olympic Qualifier Semi-Final
182	Win	172–9-1	Yvonne Rasmussen	UD	4	13 April 2016	29 years, 286 days	Samsun, Turkey	2016 European Olympic Qualifier Quarter-Final
181	Win	171–9-1	Martina Schmoranzova	UD	4	11 April 2016	29 years, 284 days	Samsun, Turkey	2016 European Olympic Qualifier Preliminaries
180	Win	170–9-1	Quanitta Underwood	UD	4	20 February 2016	29 years, 233 days	Tralee, Ireland	
179	Win	169–9-1	Jelena Jelic	UD	4	19 February 2016	29 years, 232 days	Mallow, Ireland	
178	Win	168–9-1	Shauna Browne	UD	4	27 November 2015	29 years, 148 days	National Stadium, Dublin, Ireland	2016 Irish National Championships Final
177	Win	167–9-1	Estelle Mossely	UD	4	27 June 2015	28 years, 360 days	Baku, Azerbaijan	2015 European Games Final
176	Win	166–9-1	Yana Alekseevna	SD	4	26 June 2015	28 years, 359 days	Baku, Azerbaijan	2015 European Games Semi-Final
175	Win	165–9-1	Ida Lundblad	UD	4	24 June 2015	28 years, 357 days	Baku, Azerbaijan	2015 European Games Quarter-Final
174	Win	164–9-1	Denitsa Eliseeva	UD	4	21 June 2015	28 years, 354 days	Baku, Azerbaijan	2015 European Games Preliminaries
173	Win	163–9-1	Pernilla Gustavsson	UD	4	16 May 2015	28 years, 318 days	Listowel, Ireland	
172	Win	162–9-1	Agnes Alexiusson	UD	4	15 May 2015	28 years, 317 days	Bray, Ireland	
171	Win	161–9-1	Yana Alekseevna	UD	4	24 November 2014	28 years, 145 days	Jeju, South Korea	2014 AIBA Women's World Championships Final
170	Win	160–9-1	Yin Junhua	TKO	4 (4)	23 November 2014	28 years, 144 days	Jeju, South Korea	2014 AIBA Women's World Championships Semi-Final
169	Win	159–9-1	Sofya Ochigava	WO	0 (4)	21 November 2014	28 years, 142 days	Jeju, South Korea	2014 AIBA Women's World Championships Quarter-Final
168	Win	158–9-1	Mira Potkonen	UD	4	20 November 2014	28 years, 141 days	Jeju, South Korea	2014 AIBA Women's World Championships Preliminaries Round of 16
167	Win	157–9-1	Valerian Spicer	UD	4	18 November 2014	28 years, 139 days	Jeju, South Korea	2014 AIBA Women's World Championships Preliminaries
166	Win	156–9-1	Oshin Derieuw	UD	4	12 October 2014	28 years, 102 days	Limerick, Ireland	
165	Win	155–9-1	Patricia Berghult	UD	4	11 October 2014	28 years, 101 days	Fermoy, Ireland	
164	Win	154–9-1	Estelle Mossely	UD	4	7 June 2014	27 years, 340 days	Bucharest, Romania	2014 EUBC Women's European Championships Final
163	Win	153–9-1	Denitsa Eliseeva	UD	4	7 June 2014	27 years, 340 days	Bucharest, Romania	2014 EUBC Women's European Championships Semi-Final
162	Win	152–9-1	Ioana Salomie Mera	TKO	4 (4)	4 June 2014	27 years, 337 days	Bucharest, Romania	2014 EUBC Women's European Championships Quarter-Final
161	Win	151–9-1	Sandra Brugger	UD	4	1 June 2014	27 years, 334 days	Bucharest, Romania	2014 EUBC Women's European Championships Preliminaries
160	Win	150–9-1	Kristin Carlson	UD	4	3 May 2014	27 years, 305 days	Dungarvan, Ireland	
159	Win	149–9-1	Anais Kistler	UD	4	2 May 2014	27 years, 304 days	Cork, Ireland	
158	Win	148–9-1	Marija Petric	UD	4	1 May 2014	27 years, 303 days	Cork, Ireland	
157	Win	147–9-1	Alanna Nihell	WO	0 (4)	3 March 2014	27 years, 244 days	National Stadium, Dublin, Ireland	2014 Irish National Championships Final
156	Win	146–9-1	Mira Potkonen	UD	4	30 November 2013	27 years, 151 days	Ballywaltrim Community Centre, Bray, Ireland	Katie Taylor Bray Homecoming
155	Win	145–9-1	Caroline Veyre	UD	4	29 November 2013	27 years, 150 days	Dublin, Ireland	
154	Win	144–9-1	Estelle Mossely	SD	4	6 July 2013	27 years, 4 days	Keszthely, Hungary	2013 EUBC Women's EU Championships Final
153	Win	143–9-1	Mira Potkonen	UD	4	5 July 2013	27 years, 3 days	Keszthely, Hungary	2013 EUBC Women's EU Championships Semi-Final
152	Win	142–9-1	Sara Benke	TKO	4 (4)	3 July 2013	27 years, 1 day	Keszthely, Hungary	2013 EUBC Women's EU Championships Quarter-Final
151	Win	141–9-1	Denitsa Eliseeva	PTS	4	24 March 2013	26 years, 265 days	Castlebar, Ireland	
150	Win	140–9-1	Yulia Tsyplakova	UD	4	22 March 2013	26 years, 263 days	Dublin, Ireland	
149	Win	139–9-1	Maike Klueners	UD	4	24 February 2013	26 years, 237 days	Dublin, Ireland	
148	Win	138–9-1	Karolina Graczyk	PTS	4	22 February 2013	26 years, 235 days	National Stadium, Dublin, Ireland	
147	Win	137–9-1	Sofya Ochigava	PTS	4	9 August 2012	26 years, 38 days	ExCeL Exhibition Centre, London, England	2012 London Olympic Games Final
146	Win	136–9-1	Mavzuna Chorieva	PTS	4	8 August 2012	26 years, 37 days	ExCeL Exhibition Centre, London, England	2012 London Olympic Games Semi-Final
145	Win	135–9-1	Natasha Jonas	PTS	4	6 August 2012	26 years, 35 days	ExCeL Exhibition Centre, London, England	2012 London Olympic Games Quarter-Final
144	Win	134–9-1	Sofya Ochigava	PTS	4	19 May 2012	25 years, 322 days	Olympic Sports Center, Qinhuangdao, China	2012 AIBA Women's World Championships Final
143	Win	133–9-1	Mavzuna Chorieva	PTS	4	18 May 2012	25 years, 321 days	Olympic Sports Center, Qinhuangdao, China	2012 AIBA Women's World Championships Semi-Final
142	Win	132–9-1	Mihaela Cijevschi	WO	0 (4)	16 May 2012	25 years, 319 days	Olympic Sports Center, Qinhuangdao, China	2012 AIBA Women's World Championships Quarter-Final
141	Win	131–9-1	Saida Khassenova	TKO	4 (4)	15 May 2012	25 years, 318 days	Olympic Sports Center, Qinhuangdao, China	2012 AIBA Women's World Championships Preliminaries
140	Win	130–9-1	Rim Jouini	PTS	4	14 May 2012	25 years, 317 days	Olympic Sports Center, Qinhuangdao, China	2012 AIBA Women's World Championships Preliminaries
139	Win	129–9-1	Elizabeth Leddy	UD	4	31 March 2012	25 years, 273 days	Dungarvan, Ireland	2012 Peter Crotty Memorial Tournament
138	Win	128–9-1	Elizabeth Leddy	UD	4	30 March 2012	25 years, 272 days	Cork, Ireland	
137	Win	127–9-1	Jessica Belder	PTS	4	25 March 2012	25 years, 267 days	Cavan, Ireland	
136	Win	126–9-1	Jessica Belder	PTS	4	23 March 2012	25 years, 265 days	National Stadium, Dublin, Ireland	
135	Win	125–9-1	Ingrid Egner	UD	4	25 February 2012	25 years, 238 days	Bray, Ireland	
134	Win	124–9-1	Sandra Brugger	UD	4	24 February 2012	25 years, 237 days	Bray, Ireland	
133	Win	123–9-1	Sofya Ochigava	PTS	4	22 October 2011	25 years, 112 days	Rotterdam, Netherlands	2011 EUBC Women's European Championships Final
132	Win	122–9-1	Helena Falk	PTS	4	21 October 2011	25 years, 111 days	Rotterdam, Netherlands	2011 EUBC Women's European Championships Semi-Final
131	Win	121–9-1	Aizanat Gadzhieva	PTS	4	19 October 2011	25 years, 109 days	Rotterdam, Netherlands	2011 EUBC Women's European Championships Quarter-Final
130	Win	120–9-1	Romina Marenda	PTS	4	18 October 2011	25 years, 108 days	Rotterdam, Netherlands	2011 EUBC Women's European Championships Preliminaries
129	Win	119–9-1	Julia Irmen	PTS	4	17 October 2011	25 years, 107 days	Rotterdam, Netherlands	2011 EUBC Women's European Championships Preliminaries
128	Win	118–9-1	Jessica Belder	PTS	4	1 October 2011	25 years, 91 days	Cork, Ireland	
127	Win	117–9-1	Willeke Verdellen	PTS	4	13 August 2011	25 years, 42 days	National Stadium, Dublin, Ireland	
126	Win	116–9-1	Helena Falk	UD	4	11 August 2011	25 years, 40 days	Bray, Ireland	
125	Win	115–9-1	Karolina Graczyk	PTS	4	4 June 2011	24 years, 337 days	Katowice, Poland	2011 EUBC Women's EU Championships Final
124	Win	114–9-1	Chantelle Cameron	PTS	4	3 June 2011	24 years, 336 days	Katowice, Poland	2011 EUBC Women's EU Championships Semi-Final
123	Win	113–9-1	Marzia Davide	PTS	4	1 June 2011	24 years, 334 days	Katowice, Poland	2011 EUBC Women's EU Championships Quarter-Final
122	Win	112–9-1	Denitsa Eliseeva	PTS	4	31 May 2011	24 years, 333 days	Katowice, Poland	2011 EUBC Women's EU Championships Preliminaries
121	Win	111–9-1	Maike Klueners	PTS	4	5 May 2011	24 years, 307 days	Youghal, Ireland	
120	Win	110–9-1	Mary Romero	UD	4	22 April 2011	24 years, 294 days	Bray, Ireland	
119	Win	109–9-1	Dong Cheng	PTS	4	23 March 2011	24 years, 264 days	Dungarvan, Ireland	
118	Win	108–9-1	Dong Cheng	PTS	4	20 March 2011	24 years, 261 days	New Ross, Ireland	
117	Win	107–9-1	Mary Romero	UD	4	19 March 2011	24 years, 260 days	Dublin, Ireland	
116	Win	106–9-1	Carly McNaul	WO	0	25 February 2011	24 years, 238 days	National Stadium, Dublin, Ireland	2011 Irish National Championships Final
115	Loss	105–9-1	Denitsa Eliseeva	PTS	4	19 February 2011	24 years, 232 days	Pazardzhik, Hungary	2011 Strandja Memorial Final
114	Win	105–8-1	Natasha Jonas	PTS	4	18 February 2011	24 years, 231 days	Pazardzhik, Hungary	2011 Strandja Memorial Semi-Final
113	Win	104–8-1	Danuse Dilhofova	PTS	4	17 February 2011	24 years, 230 days	Pazardzhik, Hungary	2011 Strandja Memorial Quarter-Final
112	Win	103–8-1	Dong Cheng	PTS	4	18 September 2010	24 years, 78 days	Bridgetown, Barbados	2010 AIBA Women's World Championships Final
111	Win	102–8-1	Quanitta Underwood	PTS	4	17 September 2010	24 years, 77 days	Bridgetown, Barbados	2010 AIBA Women's World Championships Semi-Final
110	Win	101–8-1	Anastasia Belyakova	PTS	4	15 September 2010	24 years, 75 days	Bridgetown, Barbados	2010 AIBA Women's World Championships Quarter-Final
109	Win	100–8-1	Adriana Dos Santos Araujo	PTS	4	13 September 2010	24 years, 73 days	Bridgetown, Barbados	2010 AIBA Women's World Championships Preliminaries
108	Win	99–8-1	Neetu Chahal	PTS	4	11 September 2010	24 years, 71 days	Bridgetown, Barbados	2010 AIBA Women's World Championships Preliminaries
107	Win	98–8-1	Denitsa Eliseeva	PTS	4	7 August 2010	24 years, 36 days	Keszthely, Hungary	2010 EUBC Women's EU Championships Final
106	Win	97–8-1	Karolina Graczyk	PTS	4	6 August 2010	24 years, 35 days	Keszthely, Hungary	2010 EUBC Women's EU Championships Semi-Final
105	Win	96–8-1	Danuse Dilhofova	DQ	3 (4)	5 August 2010	24 years, 34 days	Keszthely, Hungary	2010 EUBC Women's EU Championships Quarter-Final
104	Win	95–8-1	Jennifer Miranda	PTS	4	4 August 2010	24 years, 33 days	Keszthely, Hungary	2010 EUBC Women's EU Championships Preliminaries
103	Win	94–8-1	Ingrid Egner	SD	4	20 June 2010	23 years, 353 days	London, England	2010 Haringey Box Cup Final
102	Win	93–8-1	Sandra Brugger	PTS	4	19 June 2010	23 years, 352 days	London, England	2010 Haringey Box Cup Semi-Final
101	Loss	92–8-1	Claire Ghabrial	WO	0	11 April 2010	23 years, 283 days	Ankara, Turkey	2010 Turkish Prime Ministry Tournament Final
100	Win	92–7-1	Erkan Melek	PTS	4	10 April 2010	23 years, 282 days	Ankara, Turkey	2010 Turkish Prime Ministry Tournament Semi-Final
99	Win	91–7-1	Denitsa Eliseeva	PTS	4	9 April 2010	23 years, 281 days	Ankara, Turkey	2010 Turkish Prime Ministry Tournament Quarter-Final
98	Win	90–7-1	Tasheena Bugar	PTS	4	8 April 2010	23 years, 280 days	Ankara, Turkey	2010 Turkish Prime Ministry Tournament Preliminaries
97	Win	89–7-1	Ayat Ellah	PTS	4	7 April 2010	23 years, 279 days	Ankara, Turkey	2010 Turkish Prime Ministry Tournament Preliminaries
96	Loss	88–7-1	Sofya Ochigava	PTS	4	12 March 2010	23 years, 253 days	Usti nad Labem, Czech Republic	2010 Usti nad Labem Grand Prix Semi-Final
95	Win	88–6-1	Marzia Davide	PTS	4	11 March 2010	23 years, 252 days	Usti nad Labem, Czech Republic	2010 Usti nad Labem Grand Prix Quarter-Final
94	Win	87–6-1	Kosovare Buzuku	PTS	4	10 March 2010	23 years, 251 days	Usti nad Labem, Czech Republic	2010 Usti nad Labem Grand Prix Preliminaries
93	Win	86–6-1	Yulia Tsyplakova	PTS	4	6 March 2010	23 years, 247 days	National Stadium, Dublin, Ireland	
92	Win	85–6-1	Yulia Tsyplakova	PTS	4	5 March 2010	23 years, 246 days	National Stadium, Dublin, Ireland	
91	Win	84–6-1	Meryem Aslan Zeybek	PTS	4	20 September 2009	23 years, 80 days	Mykolaiv, Ukraine	2009 EUBC Women's European Championships Final
90	Win	83–6-1	Denitsa Eliseeva	PTS	4	18 September 2009	23 years, 78 days	Mykolaiv, Ukraine	2009 EUBC Women's European Championships Semi-Final
89	Win	82–6-1	Kosovare Buzuku	RET	1 (4)	17 September 2009	23 years, 77 days	Mykolaiv, Ukraine	2009 EUBC Women's European Championships Quarter-Final
88	Win	81–6-1	Tatyana Bondareva	PTS	4	11 July 2009	23 years, 9 days	Saint Petersburg, Russia	2009 St Petersburg International Tournament Final
87	Win	80–6-1	Oleksandra Sidorenko	PTS	4	10 July 2009	23 years, 8 days	Saint Petersburg, Russia	2009 St Petersburg International Tournament Semi-Final
86	Win	79–6-1	Aizanat Gadzhieva	PTS	4	9 July 2009	23 years, 7 days	Saint Petersburg, Russia	2009 St Petersburg International Tournament Quarter-Final
85	Win	78–6-1	Dong Cheng	PTS	4	8 July 2009	23 years, 6 days	Saint Petersburg, Russia	2009 St Petersburg International Tournament Preliminaries
84	Win	77–6-1	Denitsa Eliseeva	PTS	4	27 June 2009	22 years, 360 days	Pazardzhik, Hungary	2009 EUBC Women's EU Championships Final
83	Win	76–6-1	Cindy Orain	PTS	4	26 June 2009	22 years, 359 days	Pazardzhik, Hungary	2009 EUBC Women's EU Championships Semi-Final
82	Win	75–6-1	Giacoma Cordio	PTS	4	25 June 2009	22 years, 358 days	Pazardzhik, Hungary	2009 EUBC Women's EU Championships Quarter-Final
81	Win	74–6-1	Ozlem Dinc	PTS	4	19 April 2009	22 years, 291 days	Ahmet Comert Sport Hall, Istanbul, Russia	2009 Ahmet Comert Tournament Final
80	Win	73–6-1	Daria Abramova	RET	4 (4)	18 April 2009	22 years, 290 days	Ahmet Comert Sport Hall, Istanbul, Russia	2009 Ahmet Comert Tournament Semi-Final
79	Win	72–6-1	Danuse Dilhofova	PTS	4	17 April 2009	22 years, 289 days	Ahmet Comert Sport Hall, Istanbul, Russia	2009 Ahmet Comert Tournament Quarter-Final
78	Win	71–6-1	Oleksandra Sidorenko	PTS	4	16 April 2009	22 years, 288 days	Ahmet Comert Sport Hall, Istanbul, Russia	2009 Ahmet Comert Tournament Preliminaries
77	Win	70–6-1	Carrie Barry	PTS	4	21 March 2009	22 years, 262 days	The O2, Dublin, Ireland	
76	Win	69–6-1	Quanitta Underwood	RSC	2 (4)	1 March 2009	22 years, 242 days	Arch Centre, Athy, Ireland	
75	Win	68–6-1	Quanitta Underwood	PTS	4	27 February 2009	22 years, 240 days	National Stadium, Dublin, Ireland	
74	Win	67–6-1	Dong Cheng	PTS	3	29 November 2008	22 years, 150 days	Ningbo Sports Center, Ningbo, China	2008 AIBA Women's World Championships Final
73	Win	66–6-1	Aizanat Gadzhieva	PTS	3	28 November 2008	22 years, 149 days	Ningbo Sports Center, Ningbo, China	2008 AIBA Women's World Championships Semi-Final
72	Win	65–6-1	Adela Celeste Del Carmen Peralta	RSC	1 (3)	26 November 2008	22 years, 147 days	Ningbo Sports Center, Ningbo, China	2008 AIBA Women's World Championships Quarter-Final
71	Win	64–6-1	Danuse Dilhofova	PTS	3	25 November 2008	22 years, 146 days	Ningbo Sports Center, Ningbo, China	2008 AIBA Women's World Championships Preliminaries
70	Win	63–6-1	Emma Carruthers	PTS	3	22 November 2008	22 years, 143 days	Ningbo Sports Center, Ningbo, China	2008 AIBA Women's World Championships Final
69	Win	62–6-1	Cindy Orain	PTS	3	8 August 2008	22 years, 37 days	Greenbank Sports Academy, Liverpool, UK	2008 EABA Women's EU Championships Final
68	Win	61–6-1	Sandra Kruk	RSC	1 (3)	7 August 2008	22 years, 36 days	Greenbank Sports Academy, Liverpool, UK	2008 EABA Women's EU Championships Semi-Final
67	Win	60–6-1	Amanda Coulson	WO	3	14 June 2008	21 years, 348 days	Ahmet Comert Sport Hall, Istanbul, Russia	2008 Ahmet Comert Tournament Final
66	Win	59–6-1	Xuething Niu	PTS	3	13 June 2008	21 years, 347 days	Ahmet Comert Sport Hall, Istanbul, Russia	2008 Ahmet Comert Tournament Semi-Final
65	Win	58–6-1	Klara Svensson	PTS	3	12 June 2008	21 years, 346 days	Ahmet Comert Sport Hall, Istanbul, Russia	2008 Ahmet Comert Tournament Quarter-Final
64	Win	57–6-1	Lucie Bertaud	RSCO	2 (3)	10 June 2008	21 years, 344 days	Ahmet Comert Sport Hall, Istanbul, Russia	2008 Ahmet Comert Tournament Preliminaries
63	Win	56–6-1	Daria Abramova	PTS	3	21 March 2008	21 years, 263 days	Stupino, Russia	International Tournament Final
62	Win	55–6-1	Oleksandra Sidorenko	PTS	3	20 March 2008	21 years, 262 days	Stupino, Russia	International Tournament Semi-Final
61	Win	54–6-1	Tatyana Bondareva	PTS	3	19 March 2008	21 years, 261 days	Stupino, Russia	International Tournament Quarter-Final
60	Win	53–6-1	Gülsüm Tatar	PTS	3	18 March 2008	21 years, 260 days	Stupino, Russia	International Tournament Preliminaries
59	Win	52–6-1	Klara Svensson	PTS	3	23 February 2008	21 years, 236 days	Loreto Sports Complex, Fermoy, Ireland	
58	Win	51–6-1	Katie Dunn	RSCO	1 (3)	3 November 2007	21 years, 124 days	UIC Pavilion, Chicago, Illinois, US	2007 AIBA World Championships Final (Support Bout)
57	Win	50–6-1	Sandra Brugger	RSCO	2 (3)	20 October 2007	21 years, 110 days	Vejle, Denmark	2007 EABA Women's European Championships Final
56	Win	49–6-1	Yana Alekseevna	PTS	3	18 October 2007	21 years, 108 days	Vejle, Denmark	2007 EABA Women's European Championships Semi-Final
55	Win	48–6-1	Maria De La Guia	RSCH	1 (3)	17 October 2007	21 years, 107 days	Vejle, Denmark	2007 EABA Women's European Championships Quarter-Final
54	Win	47–6-1	Hristina Athanasopoulou	RSCO	2 (3)	16 October 2007	21 years, 106 days	Vejle, Denmark	2007 EABA Women's European Championships Preliminaries
53	Win	46–6-1	Eva Wahlström	RSCO	2 (3)	11 August 2007	21 years, 40 days	Pécs, Hungary	2007 Witch Cup Final
52	Win	45–6-1	Gülsüm Tatar	PTS	3	10 August 2007	21 years, 39 days	Pécs, Hungary	2007 Witch Cup Semi-Final
51	Win	44–6-1	Cindy Orain	RSCO	1 (3)	9 August 2007	21 years, 38 days	Pécs, Hungary	2007 Witch Cup Quarter-Final
50	Win	43–6-1	Sandra Brugger	UD	3	22 June 2007	20 years, 355 days	Ballywaltrim Community Centre, Bray, Ireland	
49	Win	42–6-1	Gülsüm Tatar	PTS	3	13 May 2007	20 years, 315 days	Ahmet Comert Sport Hall, Istanbul, Russia	2007 Ahmet Comert Tournament Final
48	Win	42–5-1	Cindy Orain	RSCO	2 (3)	12 May 2007	20 years, 314 days	Ahmet Comert Sport Hall, Istanbul, Russia	2007 Ahmet Comert Tournament Semi-Final
47	Win	41–5-1	Valeria Kurlyuk	RSCO	2 (3)	10 May 2007	20 years, 312 days	Ahmet Comert Sport Hall, Istanbul, Russia	2007 Ahmet Comert Tournament Quarter-Final
46	Win	40–5-1	Elena Savelyeva	RSCO	2 (3)	9 May 2007	20 years, 311 days	Ahmet Comert Sport Hall, Istanbul, Russia	2007 Ahmet Comert Tournament Preliminaries
45	Win	39–5-1	Amanda Coulson	RSCO	2 (3)	2 March 2007	20 years, 243 days	Dungarvan Sports Centre, Dungarvan, Ireland	
44	Win	38–5-1	Yana Kultysheva	PTS	3	23 February 2007	20 years, 236 days	Presentation Brothers College, Cork, Ireland	
43	Win	37–5-1	Eva Wahlström	PTS	3	2 February 2007	20 years, 215 days	2007 Irish National Championships Finals (Support Bout)	National Stadium, Dublin, Ireland
42	Win	36–5-1	Teresa Lukasovo	RSO	1 (3)	19 January 2007	20 years, 201 days	Gort Boxing Club, Galway, Ireland	
41	Win	35–5-1	Erica Farias	PTS	3	23 November 2006	20 years, 144 days	Talkatora Indoor Stadium, New Delhi, India	2006 AIBA Women's World Championships Final
40	Win	34–5-1	Tatyana Chalaya	PTS	3	22 November 2006	20 years, 143 days	Talkatora Indoor Stadium, New Delhi, India	2006 AIBA Women's World Championships Semi-Final
39	Win	33–5-1	Florina Popa	RSCO	2 (3)	21 November 2006	20 years, 142 days	Talkatora Indoor Stadium, New Delhi, India	2006 AIBA Women's World Championships Quarter-Final
38	Win	32–5-1	Eva Wahlström	RSCO	2 (3)	19 November 2006	20 years, 140 days	Talkatora Indoor Stadium, New Delhi, India	2006 AIBA Women's World Championships Preliminaries
37	Win	31–5-1	Carrie Barry	RSCO	1 (3)	18 November 2006	20 years, 139 days	Talkatora Indoor Stadium, New Delhi, India	2006 AIBA Women's World Championships Preliminaries
36	Loss	30–5-1	Lucie Bertaud	WO	0	22 October 2006	20 years, 112 days	Vejle, Denmark	2006 Venus Box Cup Final (Taylor withdrew due to nose injury)
35	Win	30–4-1	Florina Popa	RSCO	2 (3)	21 October 2006	20 years, 111 days	Vejle, Denmark	2006 Venus Box Cup Semi-Final
34	Win	29–4-1	Malene Kloster Nielsen	RSCO	2 (3)	20 October 2006	20 years, 110 days	Vejle, Denmark	2006 Venus Box Cup Quarter-Final
33	Win	28–4-1	Elena Gorshkova	PTS	3	19 October 2006	20 years, 109 days	Vejle, Denmark	2006 Venus Box Cup Preliminaries
32	Win	27–4-1	Tatyana Chalaya	RSCO	2 (3)	9 September 2006	20 years, 69 days	Warsaw, Poland	2006 EABA Women's European Championships Final
31	Win	26–4-1	Gülsüm Tatar	PTS	3	7 September 2006	20 years, 67 days	Warsaw, Poland	2006 EABA Women's European Championships Semi-Final
30	Win	25–4-1	Florina Popa	PTS	3	6 September 2006	20 years, 66 days	Warsaw, Poland	2006 EABA Women's European Championships Quarter-Final
29	Win	24–4-1	Teuta Cuni	RSCO	2 (3)	4 September 2006	20 years, 64 days	Warsaw, Poland	2006 EABA Women's European Championships Preliminaries
28	Win	23–4-1	Eva Wahlström	RSCO	2 (3)	12 August 2006	20 years, 41 days	Pécs, Hungary	2006 Witch Cup Final
27	Win	22–4-1	Malene Kloster Nielsen	RSCO	2 (3)	11 August 2006	20 years, 40 days	Pécs, Hungary	2006 Witch Cup Semi-Final
26	Win	21–4-1	Edina Pezdany	RSC	1 (3)	10 August 2006	20 years, 39 days	Pécs, Hungary	2006 Witch Cup Quarter-Final
25	Loss	20–4-1	Gülsüm Tatar	PTS	3	7 June 2006	19 years, 340 days	Porto Torres, Sardegna, Italy	2006 EABA Women's EU Championships Quarter-Final
24	Win	20–3-1	Yulia Busygina	PTS	3	12 May 2006	19 years, 314 days	National Stadium, Dublin, Ireland	
23	Win	19–3-1	Katie Dunn	SD	3	18 March 2006	19 years, 259 days	Loreto Sports Complex, Fermoy, Ireland	
22	Win	18–3-1	Dina Burger	PTS	3	11 March 2006	19 years, 252 days	National Stadium, Dublin, Ireland	
21	Win	17–3-1	Dina Burger	PTS	3	29 January 2006	19 years, 211 days	Oslo, Norway	2006 Norway Box Cup Final
20	Win	16–3-1	Lucie Bertaud	WO	0	28 January 2006	19 years, 210 days	Oslo, Norway	2006 Norway Box Cup Semi-Final
19	Draw	15–3-1	Marianne Millar	PTS	3	16 October 2005	19 years, 106 days	Ontario, Canada	
18	Win	15–3	Sandra Bizier	SD	3	12 October 2005	19 years, 102 days	London Convention Centre, England	
17	Loss	14–3	Kang Kum Hui	PTS	3	28 September 2005	19 years, 88 days	Podolsk, Russia	2005 AIBA Women's World Championships Quarter-Final
16	Win	14–2	Pranamika Borah	PTS	3	26 September 2005	19 years, 86 days	Podolsk, Russia	2005 AIBA Women's World Championships Preliminaries
15	Win	13–2	Eva Wahlström	PTS	3	14 May 2005	18 years, 316 days	Quality Hotel, Tønsberg, Norway	2005 EABA Women's European Championships Final
14	Win	12–2	Gülsüm Tatar	PTS	3	12 May 2005	18 years, 314 days	Quality Hotel, Tønsberg, Norway	2005 EABA Women's European Championships Semi-Final
13	Win	11–2	Lucie Bertaud	RSCO	2 (3)	11 May 2005	18 years, 313 days	Quality Hotel, Tønsberg, Norway	2005 EABA Women's European Championships Quarter-Final
12	Loss	10–2	Gülsüm Tatar	PTS	3	24 April 2005	17 years, 297 days	Istanbul, Ahmet Comert Sport Hall, Istanbul, Russia	2005 Ahmet Comert Tournament Semi-Final
11	Win	10–1	Cindy Orain	RSCO	2 (3)	23 April 2005	17 years, 296 days	Istanbul, Ahmet Comert Sport Hall, Istanbul, Russia	2005 Ahmet Comert Tournament Quarter-Final
10	Loss	9–1	Yulia Nemtsova	PTS	3	4 October 2004	18 years, 94 days	Riccione, Emilia Romagna, Italy	2004 EABA Women's European Championships Preliminaries
9	Win	9–0	Jennifer Ogg	PTS	3	12 June 2004	17 years, 346 days	Cascia, Umbria, Italy	2004 Torneo Italia Final
8	Win	8–0	Eva Wahlström	PTS	3	11 June 2004	17 years, 345 days	Cascia, Umbria, Italy	2004 Torneo Italia Semi-Final
7	Win	7–0	Emanuela Pantani	PTS	3	9 June 2004	17 years, 343 days	Cascia, Umbria, Italy	2004 Torneo Italia Quarter-Final
6	Win	6–0	Lana Cooper	RSC	2 (3)	27 February 2004	17 years, 240 days	Fermoy Rowing Club, Fermoy, Ireland	
5	Win	5–0	Josefina Tengroth	RSC	2 (3)	11 January 2004	17 years, 193 days	Oslo, Norway	2004 Norway Box Cup Final
4	Win	4–0	Ingrid Egner	PTS	3	9 January 2004	17 years, 191 days	Oslo, Norway	2004 Norway Box Cup Semi-Final
3	Win	3–0	Rebecca Price	PTS	3	24 June 2003	16 years, 357 days	Belfast, Northern Ireland	
2	Win	2–0	Candy Berry	RSC	2 (3)	1 March 2002	15 years, 242 days	National Stadium, Dublin, Ireland	
1	Win	1–0	Alanna Nihell	PTS	3	31 October 2001	15 years, 121 days	National Stadium, Dublin, Ireland	First officially sanctioned women's bout ever held in Ireland

== Championships and accomplishments ==
=== Major world titles ===
- WBA (super) lightweight champion (135 lbs)
- IBF lightweight champion (135 lbs)
- WBO lightweight champion (135 lbs)
- WBC lightweight champion (135 lbs)
- WBA super lightweight champion (140 lbs)
- IBF super lightweight champion (140 lbs)
- WBO super lightweight champion (140 lbs) (2x)
- WBC super lightweight champion (140 lbs) (2x)

=== The Ring magazine titles ===
- The Ring lightweight champion (135 lbs)
- The Ring super lightweight champion (140 lbs)

=== Minor world titles ===
- IBO super lightweight champion (140 lbs) (2x)

=== Regional/International titles ===
- WBA Inter-Continental lightweight champion (135 lbs)

=== Undisputed titles ===
- Undisputed lightweight champion (135 lbs)
- Undisputed super lightweight champion (140 lbs) (2x)

=== Honorary titles ===
- WBO Super champion
- WBC Emeritus champion

=== Commemorative titles ===
- WBC Queen of the Celts commemorative belt

=== Title wins ===
Title	Defeated	Venue	Date won	Duration of reign	Defences	Notes
WBA Inter-Continental lightweight champion	Nina Meinke	Wembley Stadium	29 April 2017	128 days	0	
WBA lightweight champion	Anahí Ester Sánchez	Millennium Stadium	28 October 2017	2,613 days	14	Super champion from 30 April 2018 – 30 September 2018
IBF lightweight champion	Victoria Bustos	Barclays Center	28 April 2018	2,078 days	12	
WBO lightweight champion	Rose Volante	Liacouras Center	15 March 2019	1,757 days	8	
WBC lightweight champion	Delfine Persoon	Madison Square Garden	1 June 2019	1,685 days	7	
The Ring female lightweight champion	Delfine Persoon	Madison Square Garden	1 June 2019	1,685 days	7	
Undisputed lightweight champion	Delfine Persoon	Madison Square Garden	1 June 2019	1,685 days	7	
WBO super lightweight champion	Christina Linardatou	Manchester Arena	2 November 2019	57 days	0	
WBA super lightweight champion	Chantelle Cameron	3Arena	25 November 2023	1,029 days	3	
IBF super lightweight champion	Chantelle Cameron	3Arena	25 November 2023	1,021 days	3	
WBO super lightweight champion	Chantelle Cameron	3Arena	25 November 2023	1,029 days	3	
The Ring super lightweight champion	Chantelle Cameron	3Arena	25 November 2023	1,029 days	3	
WBC super lightweight champion	Chantelle Cameron	3Arena	25 November 2023	662 days	2	
IBO super lightweight champion	Chantelle Cameron	3Arena	25 November 2023	662 days	2	
Undisputed super lightweight champion	Chantelle Cameron	3Arena	25 November 2023	662 days	2	
WBC super lightweight champion	Flora Pili	Croke Park	5 September 2026	14 days	0	
IBO super lightweight champion	Flora Pili	Croke Park	5 September 2026	14 days	0	
Undisputed super lightweight champion	Flora Pili	Croke Park	5 September 2026	6 days	0	

=== Amateur titles ===
Year	Tournament	Venue	Result	Event
2005	European Amateur Championships	Tønsberg, Norway	1st	60 kg
2006	European Amateur Championships	Warsaw, Poland	1st	60 kg
2006	World Amateur Championship	New Delhi, India	1st	60 kg
2007	European Amateur Championships	Vejle, Denmark	1st	60 kg
2008	European Union Amateur Championships	Liverpool, England	1st	60 kg
2008	World Amateur Championship	Ningbo, China	1st	60 kg
2009	European Union Amateur Championships	Pazardzhik, Bulgaria	1st	60 kg
2009	European Amateur Championships	Mykolaiv, Ukraine	1st	60 kg
2010	European Union Amateur Championships	Keszthely, Hungary	1st	60 kg
2010	World Amateur Championship	Bridgetown, Barbados	1st	60 kg
2011	European Union Amateur Championships	Katowice, Poland	1st	60 kg
2011	European Amateur Championships	Rotterdam, Netherlands	1st	60 kg
2012	World Amateur Championship	Qinhuangdao, China	1st	60 kg
2012	Olympic Games	London, England	1st	60 kg
2013	European Union Amateur Championships	Keszthely, Hungary	1st	60 kg
2014	European Amateur Championships	Bucharest, Romania	1st	60 kg
2014	World Amateur Championship	Jeju, South Korea	1st	60 kg
2015	European Games	Baku, Azerbaijan	1st	60 kg
2016	World Amateur Championship	Astana, Kazakhstan	3rd	60 kg

=== Awards ===
- 2004 FAI International Football Awards – Under-19 Women's International Player of the Year
- 2010 International Boxing Association (AIBA) World Female Boxer of the Year.
- 2012 People of the Year Awards – Sportsperson of the Year
- 2012 RTÉ Sports Person of the Year
- 2012 Irish Book Awards – Irish Sports Book
- 2013 Dublin City University Honorary degree, D.Phil. (hc)
- 2014 The Irish Times/Irish Sports Council Sportswoman of the Year.
- 2017 WBAN European Fighter of the Year
- 2018 WBAN European Fighter of the Year
- 2019 BWAA – Christy Martin Award / Female Fighter of the Year
- 2020 RTÉ Sports Person of the Year
- 2021 WBAN European Fighter of the Year
- 2022 RTÉ Sports Person of the Year
- 2022 WBAN European Fighter of the Year
- 2022 Sports Illustrated Fighter of the Year
- 2022 Sports Illustrated Fight of the Year
- 2022 The Ring Magazine Event of the Year
- 2023 WBAN Fighter of the Year (Note: Shared with Amanda Serrano.)
- 2024 WBAN Fighter of the Year
- 2025 ESPY Awards – Best Boxer
- 2025 WBAN European Fighter of the Year

== Filmography ==
Key
†	Denotes films that have not yet been released

=== Film ===
Year	Title	Role	Notes
2012	First	Olympian	Documentary film
2018	Katie	Herself	Documentary film
2024	Countdown: Paul vs. Tyson	Herself	Documentary film
2025	Countdown: Taylor vs. Serrano	Herself	Documentary film
2026	Taming The Beast	Herself	Documentary film

=== Television ===
Year	Title	Role	Notes
2025	Matchroom: The Greatest Showmen	Herself	Episode: A Women's World

=== Video games ===
Year	Title	Role	Ref.
2024	Undisputed	Herself	

=== Podcasts ===
Air Date	Title	Role
17 March 2026	The Art Of Ward	Exclusive guest
12 November 2026	Ring Champs	Exclusive guest

== See also ==
- List of female boxers
- List of current female world boxing champions
- List of female undisputed world boxing champions
- List of WBA female world champions
- List of IBF female world champions
- List of WBO female world champions
- List of WBC female world champions
- List of The Ring female world champions
- List of IBO female world champions
- List of flag bearers for Ireland at the Olympics
- List of multi-sport athletes

== Notes and references ==
=== References ===
Sporting positions
Regional boxing titles
New title	WBA female Inter-Continental lightweight champion 29 April 2017 – 28 October 2017; Won world title	Vacant
Minor World boxing titles
Vacant Title last held by Chantelle Cameron	IBO female light welterweight champion 25 November 2023 – present	Incumbent
Major World boxing titles
Vacant Title last held by Anahí Ester Sánchez	WBA female lightweight champion 28 October 2017 – present	Incumbent
Preceded by Victoria Bustos	IBF female lightweight champion 28 April 2018 – 5 January 2024; Vacated	Vacant
Preceded by Rose Volante	WBO female lightweight champion 15 March 2019 – 5 January 2024; Vacated	Vacant
Preceded by Delfine Persoon	WBC female lightweight champion 1 June 2019 – present	Incumbent
Inaugural champion	The Ring female lightweight champion 1 June 2019 – present	Incumbent
Inaugural champion	Undisputed female lightweight champion 1 June 2019 – 5 January 2024; Titles fragmented	Vacant
Preceded by Christina Linardatou	WBO female light welterweight champion 2 November 2019 – December 2019; Vacated	Vacant Title next held by Christina Linardatou
Preceded by Chantelle Cameron	WBA female light welterweight champion 25 November 2023 – present	Incumbent
Preceded by Chantelle Cameron	WBC female light welterweight champion 25 November 2023 – 17 September 2025	Vacant
Preceded by Chantelle Cameron	IBF female light welterweight champion 25 November 2023 – present	Incumbent
Preceded by Chantelle Cameron	WBO female light welterweight champion 25 November 2023 – present	Incumbent
Preceded by Chantelle Cameron	The Ring female light welterweight champion 25 November 2023 – present	Incumbent
Preceded by Chantelle Cameron	Undisputed female light welterweight champion 25 November 2023 – 17 September 2025	Vacant
Honorary boxing titles
New title	WBC female light welterweight champion in recess 17 September 2025 – present	Incumbent
Olympic Games
Previous: Ciara Peelo	Flagbearer for Ireland; 2012 London	Next: Paddy Barnes
Awards
Previous: Claressa Shields	BWAA Female Fighter of the Year; 2019	Incumbent
