= 2014 AIBA Women's World Boxing Championships – Lightweight =

Boxing competitions

The Lightweight (60 kg) competition at the 2014 AIBA Women's World Boxing Championships was held from 17 to 24 November 2014.

== Medalists ==
Gold	Katie Taylor (IRL)
Silver	Yana Alekseevna (AZE)
Bronze	Yin Junhua (CHN)
Bronze	Estelle Mossely (FRA)

== Draw ==
=== Preliminaries ===
	Result	
Mira Potkonen (Finland)	3–0	(Mongolia) Oyuungereliin Suvd-Erdene
Sofya Ochigava (Russia)	3–0	(Chinese Taipei) Chen Chia-ling
Yin Junhua (China)	3–0	(India) Priyanka Chauhdary
Charlene Jones (Wales)	2–0	(Canada) Caroline Veyre
Hasnaa Lachgar (Morocco)	3–0	(Argentina) Dayana Sánchez
Mariska Janssen (Netherlands)	0–3	(Switzerland) Sandra Brugger
Yana Alekseevna (Azerbaijan)	3–0	(Hungary) Vivien Csombor
Ayat El-Said (Egypt)	0–3	(Kazakhstan) Gulzhaina Ubbiniyazova

=== Top half ===
First Round
(Japan) Chinase Hujino	0
(Finland) Mira Potkonen	3
(Dominica) Valerian Spicer	0
(Republic of Ireland) Katie Taylor	3
(Brazil) Adriana Araújo	3
(Cameroon) Ndiang Christelle	0
(Russia) Sofya Ochigava	3
(England) Chantelle Cameron	0
(Nicaragua) Irene Aguirre	0
(China) Yin Junhua	3
(Spain) Jennifer Miranda	3
(Nepal) Saraswati Rani	0
(Bulgaria) Denitsa Eliseeva	2
(United States) Quanitta Underwood	1
(Wales) Charlene Jones	0
(Italy) Romina Marenda	3

Second Round
(Finland) Mira Potkonen	0
(Republic of Ireland) Katie Taylor	3
(Brazil) Adriana Araújo	0
(Russia) Sofya Ochigava	2
(China) Yin Junhua	3
(Spain) Jennifer Miranda	0
(Bulgaria) Denitsa Eliseeva	3
(Italy) Romina Marenda	0

Quarterfinals
(Republic of Ireland) Katie Taylor	WO
(Russia) Sofya Ochigava
(China) Yin Junhua	2
(Bulgaria) Denitsa Eliseeva	0

Semifinals
(Republic of Ireland) Katie Taylor	TKO
(China) Yin Junhua

=== Bottom half ===
First Round
(Thailand) Tassamalee Thongjan	2
(Morocco) Hasnaa Lachgar	1
(Algeria) Elhem Mekhaled	0
(Poland) Kinga Siwa	3
(New Zealand) Alexis Pritchard	1
(Vietnam) Lừu Thị Duyên	2
(Switzerland) Sandra Brugger	0
(France) Estelle Mossely	2
(Germany) Tasheena Bugar	0
(Azerbaijan) Yana Alekseevna	3
(Ukraine) Iuliia Tsyplakova	2
(Sweden) Patricia Berghult	0
(Australia) Shelley Watts	3
(South Korea) Park Ji-na	0
(Kazakhstan) Gulzhaina Ubbiniyazova	2
(Turkey) Gamze Başar	1

Second Round
(Thailand) Tassamalee Thongjan	1
(Poland) Kinga Siwa	2
(Vietnam) Lừu Thị Duyên	0
(France) Estelle Mossely	2
(Azerbaijan) Yana Alekseevna	3
(Ukraine) Iuliia Tsyplakova	0
(Australia) Shelley Watts	3
(Kazakhstan) Gulzhaina Ubbiniyazova	0

Quarterfinals
(Poland) Kinga Siwa	0
(France) Estelle Mossely	2
(Azerbaijan) Yana Alekseevna	3
(Australia) Shelley Watts	0

Semifinals
(France) Estelle Mossely	1
(Azerbaijan) Yana Alekseevna	2

=== Final ===
Final
(Republic of Ireland) Katie Taylor	3
(Azerbaijan) Yana Alekseevna	0
