= 2016 AIBA Women's World Boxing Championships – Lightweight =

Boxing competitions

Lightweight at the 2016 AIBA Women's World Boxing Championships
- Dates: 19–27 May
- Competitors: 47 from 47 nations

Medalists
gold medal	Estelle Mossely	France
silver medal	Anastasiia Beliakova	Russia
bronze medal	Katie Taylor	Ireland
bronze medal	Mira Potkonen	Finland

The Lightweight (60 kg) competition at the 2016 AIBA Women's World Boxing Championships was held from 19 to 27 May 2016.

== Draw ==
=== Preliminaries ===
	Result	
(Sweden) Agnes Alexiusson	3–0	(Italy) Irma Testa
(Belarus) Ala Yarshevich	0-3	(India) Laishram Sarita Devi
(Vietnam) Lừu Thị Duyên	0-3	(Denmark) Yvonne Rasmussen
(Tajikistan) Mavzuna Chorieva	3–0	(Chinese Taipei) Chen Wen-ling
(New Zealand) Alexis Pritchard	TKO	(Moldova) Lilia Venglovscaia
(Canada) Caroline Veyre	3–0	(Czech Republic) Martina Schmoranzová
(Germany) Tasheena Bugar	0-3	(North Korea) Ri Tong-sun
(United States) Mikaela Mayer	3–0	(Turkey) Esra Yıldız
(United Kingdom) Chantelle Cameron	TKO	(Jordan) Asma Ismail
(Switzerland) Sandra Brugger	3–0	(Uzbekistan) Maftunakhon Melieva
(Thailand) Tassamalee Thongjan	3–0	(Sri Lanka) Vidusika Mohotti
(Morocco) Hasnaa Lachgar	TKO	(Tunisia) Hlimi Khouloud
(Puerto Rico) Kiria Tapia	3–0	(Mongolia) Oyuungereliin Suvd-Erdene
(Armenia) Ashkhen Hovannisjan	0–3	(Ukraine) Iuliia Tsyplakova
(Hungary) Tímea Takács	TKO	(Dominica) Valerian Spicer

=== Main draw ===
Round of 32
21 May
(Republic of Ireland) Katie Taylor	3
(Sweden) Agnes Alexiusson	0
21 May
(Nepal) Saraswati Rana	0
(Argentina) Dayana Sánchez	3
21 May
(Mexico) Victoria Torres	3
(India) Laishram Sarita Devi	0
21 May
(Denmark) Yvonne Rasmussen	2
(Kazakhstan) Rimma Volossenko	1
21 May
(Azerbaijan) Yana Alekseevna	3
(Tajikistan) Mavzuna Chorieva	0
21 May
(New Zealand) Alexis Pritchard	2
(Japan) Ayako Minowa	1
21 May
(Croatia) Maja Šarić
(Canada) Caroline Veyre	TKO
21 May
(North Korea) Ri Tong-sun	0
(France) Estelle Mossely	3
21 May
(China) Yin Junhua	3
(United States) Mikaela Mayer	0
21 May
(United Kingdom) Chantelle Cameron	1
(Finland) Mira Potkonen	2
21 May
(Spain) Miriam Gutiérrez	0
(Switzerland) Sandra Brugger	3
21 May
(Thailand) Tassamalee Thongjan	3
(South Korea) Oh Yeon-ji	1
21 May
(Poland) Kinga Śliwa	1
(Morocco) Hasnaa Lachgar	2
21 May
(Puerto Rico) Kiria Tapia	2
(Bulgaria) Svetlana Staneva	0
21 May
(Brazil) Adriana Araújo	2
(Ukraine) Iuliia Tsyplakova	0
21 May
(Dominica) Valerian Spicer	0
(Russia) Anastasiia Beliakova	3

Round of 16
23 May
(Republic of Ireland) Katie Taylor	3
(Argentina) Dayana Sánchez	0
23 May
(Mexico) Victoria Torres	3
(Denmark) Yvonne Rasmussen	0
23 May
(Azerbaijan) Yana Alekseevna	2
(New Zealand) Alexis Pritchard	0
23 May
(Canada) Caroline Veyre	0
(France) Estelle Mossely	3
23 May
(China) Yin Junhua	1
(Finland) Mira Potkonen	2
23 May
(Switzerland) Sandra Brugger	2
(Thailand) Tassamalee Thongjan	1
23 May
(Morocco) Hasnaa Lachgar	WO
(Puerto Rico) Kiria Tapia
23 May
(Brazil) Adriana Araújo	0
(Russia) Anastasiia Beliakova	3

Quarterfinals
24 May
(Republic of Ireland) Katie Taylor	3
(Mexico) Victoria Torres	0
24 May
(Azerbaijan) Yana Alekseevna	0
(France) Estelle Mossely	3
24 May
(Finland) Mira Potkonen	3
(Switzerland) Sandra Brugger	0
24 May
(Morocco) Hasnaa Lachgar	0
(Russia) Anastasiia Beliakova	2

Semifinals
26 May
(Republic of Ireland) Katie Taylor	1
(France) Estelle Mossely	2
26 May
(Finland) Mira Potkonen	0
(Russia) Anastasiia Beliakova	3

Final
27 May
(France) Estelle Mossely	3
(Russia) Anastasiia Beliakova	0
