= Boxing at the 2015 European Games – Women's 60 kg =

Boxing competitions

Women's lightweight boxing at the 2015 European Games
- Venue: Baku Crystal Hall
- Date: 21–27 June
- Competitors: 16 from 16 nations

Medalists
gold medal	Katie Taylor	Ireland
silver medal	Estelle Mossely	France
bronze medal	Yana Alekseevna	Azerbaijan
bronze medal	Tasheena Bugar	Germany

The women's lightweight 60 kg boxing event at the 2015 European Games in Baku was held from 21 to 27 June at the Baku Crystal Hall.

== Results ==
Round of 16; 21 June
Estelle Mossely (FRA)	3
Jennifer Miranda (ESP)	0
Romina Marenda (ITA)	3
Ioana Mera (ROU)	0
Tasheena Bugar (GER)	3
Lilia Venglovscaia (MDA)	0
Vivien Csombor (HUN)	0
Jelena Jelić (SRB)	2
Yana Alekseevna (AZE)	3
Mira Potkonen (FIN)	0
Zinaida Dobrynina (RUS)	3
Sandra Brügger (SUI)	0
Ida Lundblad (SWE)	3
Gamze Başar (TUR)	0
Katie Taylor (IRL)	3
Denitsa Eliseeva (BUL)	0

Quarterfinals; 23–24 June
Estelle Mossely (FRA)	3
Romina Marenda (ITA)	0
Tasheena Bugar (GER)	3
Jelena Jelić (SRB)	0
Yana Alekseevna (AZE)	3
Zinaida Dobrynina (RUS)	0
Ida Lundblad (SWE)	0
Katie Taylor (IRL)	3

Semifinals; 26 June
Estelle Mossely (FRA)	3
Tasheena Bugar (GER)	0
Yana Alekseevna (AZE)	1
Katie Taylor (IRL)	2

Final; 27 June
Estelle Mossely (FRA)	0
Katie Taylor (IRL)	3
