= Boxing at the 2016 Summer Olympics – Women's lightweight =

Boxing competitions

Women's lightweight boxing at the Games of the XXXI Olympiad
- Venue: Riocentro – Pavilion 6
- Date: 12–19 August 2016
- Competitors: 12 from 12 nations

Medalists
1st place, gold medalist(s)		Estelle Mossely	France
2nd place, silver medalist(s)		Yin Junhua	China
3rd place, bronze medalist(s)		Mira Potkonen	Finland
3rd place, bronze medalist(s)		Anastasia Belyakova	Russia

The women's lightweight boxing competition at the 2016 Olympic Games in Rio de Janeiro was held from 12 to 19 August at the Riocentro. Estelle Mossely won the gold, beating Yin Junhua in the final. The bronze medals were awarded to Anastasia Belyakova of Russia and Mira Potkonen of Finland, the latter being her country's only medal at the 2016 games.

== Schedule ==
All times are Brasília Time (UTC−3).

Date	Time	Round
Friday, 12 August 2016	11:34	Round of 16
Monday, 15 August 2016	11:00	Quarter-finals
Wednesday, 17 August 2016	14:00	Semi-finals
Friday, 19 August 2016	16:00	Final

== Results ==
Round of 16
Mira Potkonen (FIN)	2
Adriana Araújo (BRA)	1
Yin Junhua (CHN)	3
Hasnaa Lachgar (MAR)	0
Jennifer Chieng (FSM)	0
Mikaela Mayer (USA)	3
Irma Testa (ITA)	2
Shelley Watts (AUS)	1

Quarter-finals
Katie Taylor (IRL)	1
Mira Potkonen (FIN)	2
Yin Junhua (CHN)	3
Yana Alekseevna (AZE)	0
Anastasia Belyakova (RUS)	2
Mikaela Mayer (USA)	0
Irma Testa (ITA)	0
Estelle Mossely (FRA)	3

Semi-finals
Mira Potkonen (FIN)	0
Yin Junhua (CHN)	3
Anastasia Belyakova (RUS)
Estelle Mossely (FRA)	TKO

Final
Yin Junhua (CHN)	1
Estelle Mossely (FRA)	2
