= 2014 AIBA Women's World Boxing Championships – Light welterweight =

Boxing competitions

The Light welterweight (64 kg) competition at the 2014 AIBA Women's World Boxing Championships was held from 16–24 November 2014.

== Medalists ==
Gold	Anastasiia Beliakova (RUS)
Silver	Sandy Ryan (ENG)
Bronze	Shim Hee-jung (KOR)
Bronze	Sudaporn Seesondee (THA)

== Draw ==
=== Top half ===
First Round
(Germany) Irina Schönberger	0
(Kazakhstan) Zarina Tsoloyeva	3
(Switzerland) Anaïs Kistler	0
(Russia) Anastasiia Beliakova	3
(Algeria) Rania Mallaoui	0
(China) Xie Lili	3
(Mongolia) Erdenesoyol Uyanga	0
(Barbados) Kimberley Gittens	3
(South Korea) Shim Hee-jung	3
(Netherlands) Lisa de Vilder	0

Second Round
(India) Pavitra	2
(Kazakhstan) Zarina Tsoloyeva	1
(Russia) Anastasiia Beliakova	3
(China) Xie Lili	0
(Lithuania) Vaida Valskytė	3
(Barbados) Kimberley Gittens	0
(South Korea) Shim Hee-jung	3
(Italy) Valentina Alberti	0

Quarterfinals
(India) Pavitra	0
(Russia) Anastasiia Beliakova	3
(Lithuania) Vaida Valskytė	0
(South Korea) Shim Hee-jung	3

Semifinals
(Russia) Anastasiia Beliakova	3
(South Korea) Shim Hee-jung	0

=== Bottom half ===
First Round
(Denmark) Camilla Skov Jensen	1
(Romania) Simona Sitar	2
(Turkey) Gülsüm Tatar	3
(Spain) Miriam Gutierrez	0
(England) Sandy Ryan	3
(Hungary) Bianka Nagy	0
(Mexico) Esmeralda Falcón	1
(Morocco) Asmae Ouazri	2
(Czech Republic) Martina Schmoranzová	3
(Montenegro) Aleksandra Vujović	0
(Thailand) Sudaporn Seesondee	3
(Ukraine) Nila Lipskaya	0

Second Round
(United States) Destiny Chearino	0
(Romania) Simona Sitar	2
(Turkey) Gülsüm Tatar	0
(England) Sandy Ryan	3
(Morocco) Asmae Ouazri	0
(Czech Republic) Martina Schmoranzová	2
(Thailand) Sudaporn Seesondee	3
(Argentina) Macarena Ledesma	0

Quarterfinals
(Romania) Simona Sitar	0
(England) Sandy Ryan	3
(Czech Republic) Martina Schmoranzová	1
(Thailand) Sudaporn Seesondee	2

Semifinals
(England) Sandy Ryan	3
(Thailand) Sudaporn Seesondee	0

=== Final ===
Final
(Russia) Anastasiia Beliakova	3
(England) Sandy Ryan	0
