= Boxing at the 2019 European Games – Women's 60 kg =

Boxing competitions

Women's lightweight boxing at the 2019 European Games
- Venue: Uruchie Sports Palace
- Date: 23–30 June
- Competitors: 12 from 12 nations

Medalists
gold medal	Mira Potkonen	Finland
silver medal	Kellie Harrington	Ireland
bronze medal	Anastasia Belyakova	Russia
bronze medal	Agnes Alexiusson	Sweden

The women's lightweight 60 kg boxing event at the 2019 European Games in Minsk was held from 23 to 30 June at the Uruchie Sports Palace.

== Results ==
Round of 16; 23 June
Irma Testa (ITA)	5
Cristina Cravcenco (MDA)	0
Aneta Rygielska (POL)	0
Agnes Alexiusson (SWE)	5
Ditte Frostholm (DEN)	5
Donjeta Sadiku (KOS)	0
Ala Yarshevich (BLR)	4
Iuliia Tsyplakova (UKR)	1

Quarterfinals; 26 June
Kellie Harrington (IRL)	4
Irma Testa (ITA)	1
Agnes Alexiusson (SWE)	5
Denitsa Eliseeva (BUL)	0
Anastasia Belyakova (RUS)	5
Ditte Frostholm (DEN)	0
Ala Yarshevich (BLR)	0
Mira Potkonen (FIN)	5

Semifinals; 28 June
Kellie Harrington (IRL)	5
Agnes Alexiusson (SWE)	0
Anastasia Belyakova (RUS)	0
Mira Potkonen (FIN)	4

Final; 30 June
Kellie Harrington (IRL)
Mira Potkonen (FIN)	WO
