= Boxing at the 2014 Pan American Sports Festival =

The Boxing competition at the 2014 Pan American Sports Festival was held at Gimnasio Olímpico Juan de la Barrera, Mexico City, Mexico from 16–20 July.

== Medal summary ==
=== Men's events ===
Event	Gold	Silver	Bronze
–49kg	Joselito Velázquez (MEX)	Yuberjen Martínez (COL)	Leonel de los Santos (DOM); Anthony Chacon (PUR)
–52kg	Elias Emigdio (MEX)	Ceiber Ávila (COL)	Orlando González (PUR); Juliao Neto (BRA)
–56kg	Héctor García (DOM)	Sergio Chirino (MEX)	Joselito Aguirre (GUA); Carlos Rocha (BRA)
–60kg	Lindolfo Delgado (MEX)	Luis Porozo (ECU)	Max Santos (BRA); Sparkinson Almonte (DOM)
–64kg	Joedison Teixeira (BRA)	Juan Romero (MEX)	Sebastian Chavez (ARG); Moirat Vinet (CUB)
–69kg	Marvin Cabrera (MEX)	Alberto Puello (DOM)	Reiniel Palacios (CUB); Nicklaus Flaz (PUR)
–75kg	Myke Carvalho (BRA)	Jorge Vivas (COL)	Misael Rodríguez (MEX); Luis Hernández (PAN)
–81kg	Rogelio Romero (MEX)	Michel Borges (BRA)	Akeem Isidore (BAR)
–91kg	Frank Sánchez (CUB)	Brandon Olvera (MEX)	Deivis Julio (COL); Bruno Angeleri (ARG)
+91kg	Cam Awesome (USA)	Edgar Ramirez (MEX)	Jorge Quiñonez (ECU); Carlos Moreno (PAN)

=== Women's events ===
Event	Gold	Silver	Bronze
–51kg	Marlen Esparza (USA)	Sulem Urbina (MEX)	Clelia Costa (BRA); Maria Micheo (GUA)
–60kg	Quanitta Underwood (USA)	Victoria Torres (MEX)	Dayana Sánchez (ARG); Jenifer Cáceres (COL)
–75kg	Claressa Shields (USA)	Yenebier Guillen (DOM)	Alma Ibarra (MEX)
