= Boxing at the 2010 South American Games – Women's 60kg =

The Women's 60 kg event at the 2010 South American Games had its semifinals held on March 24 and the final on March 27.

== Medalists ==
Gold	Silver	Bronze
Adriana Araujo; Brazil	Dayana Sánchez; Argentina	Jenifer Caceres; Colombia; Moraily de Windt; Netherlands Antilles

== Results ==
Semifinals
1	Daiana Sanchez (ARG)	RSC
4	Moraily de Windt (AHO)
3	Jenifer Caceres (COL)
2	Adriana Araujo (BRA)	RSC

Final
Daiana Sanchez (ARG)	8
Adriana Araujo (BRA)	15
