= Michel Borges =

Brazilian boxer (born 1991)

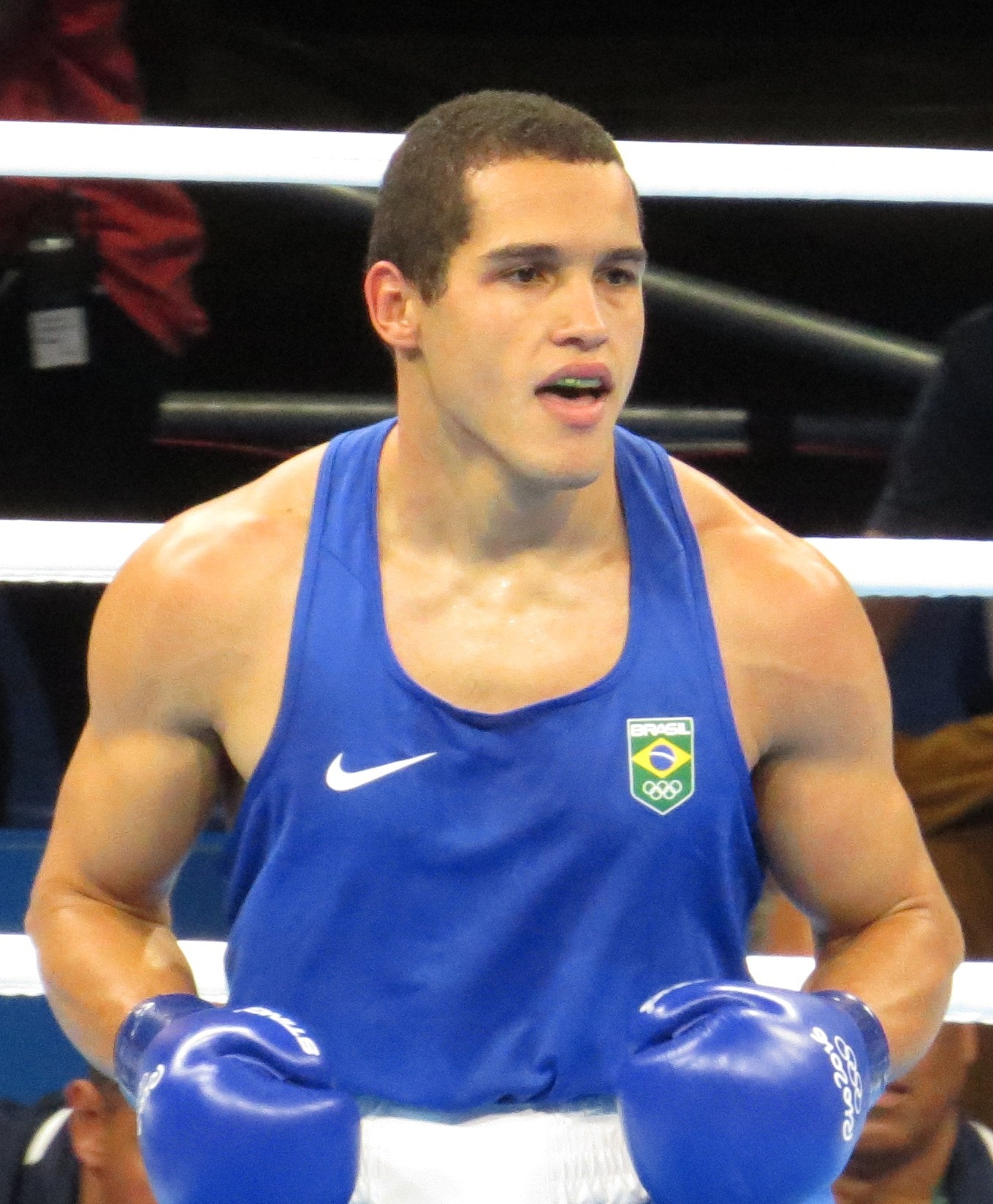
- Borges at the 2016 Olympics

Personal information
- Full name: Michel de Souza Borges
- Born: 16 June 1991 (age 35) Rio de Janeiro, Brazil
- Height: 182 cm (6 ft 0 in)
- Weight: 81 kg (179 lb)

Sport
- Sport: Boxing
- Club: Academia Raff Giglio; Instituto Todos na Luta
- Coached by: Cláudio Aires; João Carlos Barros

Michel de Souza Borges known as Michel Borges (born 16 June 1991) is a Brazilian boxer who won a silver medal in the 81 kg weight category at the 2014 Pan American Sports Festival. He competed at the 2016 Summer Olympics in the same category, but was eliminated in the third bout.
