= Hasnaa Lachgar =

Moroccan boxer (born 1989)

Personal information
- Born: 27 September 1989 (age 36) Casablanca, Morocco
- Height: 164 cm (5 ft 5 in)
- Weight: 60 kg (132 lb)

Boxing career
- Weight class: Lightweight

Hasnaa Lachgar (Arabic: حسناء لشكر; born 27 September 1989) is a Moroccan boxer. She competed in the women's lightweight event at the 2016 Summer Olympics, where she was eliminated in the round of 16 by China's Yin Jh.
