= Anastasia Belyakova =

Russian boxer (born 1993)

Personal information
- Born: Анастаси́я Евге́ньевна Беляко́ва; 1 May 1993 (age 33)

Boxing career
Medal record
Women's amateur boxing
Representing Russia
Olympic Games
Bronze medal – third place	2016 Rio de Janeiro	Lightweight
World Championships
Gold medal – first place	2014 Jeju City	Light welterweight
Silver medal – second place	2016 Astana	Lightweight
European Games
Gold medal – first place	2015 Baku	Light welterweight
Bronze medal – third place	2019 Minsk	Lightweight
European Championships
Gold medal – first place	2014 Bucharest	Light welterweight
Silver medal – second place	2018 Sofia	Lightweight

Anastasia Belyakova (born 1 May 1993) is a Russian boxer. She competed in the women's lightweight event at the 2016 Summer Olympics, winning a bronze medal.

== Early life and education ==
At the age of nine, she lost her father and grew up without her mother under the guardianship of her grandmother. She lived with her grandmother and older sister.

At the age of thirteen, she began training in boxing at the Zlatoust Sports School of Olympic Reserve No. 5 under coach Evgeny Tarasov, who suggested that she switch from cross-country skiing to boxing.

== Career ==
=== Junior achievements ===
At the 2010 World Championships in the 60 kg weight category, Belyakova placed 5th–8th. In the same year, she won the Junior European Championship, and in 2011, became World Champion among girls under 18. She went on to win silver at the 2013 World Combat Games and gold at the 2014 Russian Youth Spartakiad.

She is a six-time Russian national champion (2012, 2013, 2015, 2017, 2018, 2019).

=== International success ===
In 2014, Belyakova won gold medals at both the European and World Championships. In the European final, she defeated Natasha Jonas of England, and in the World Championship final, she defeated Sandy Ryan, also of England.

In 2015, she once again won her weight category at the European Games, after which she moved up to the 60 kg category. There, she earned silver at the World Championships, losing to Estelle Mossely of France, but at the same time securing an Olympic berth.

=== 2016 Summer Olympics ===
At the 2016 Summer Olympics, Belyakova defeated American boxer Mikaela Mayer in the quarterfinal. In the semifinal against Estelle Mossely, she suffered an elbow injury and lost by technical knockout. Despite the defeat, this result earned Russia its first-ever Olympic bronze medal in women's boxing. Belyakova was congratulated on her medal by Russian Prime Minister Dmitry Medvedev and Governor of Chelyabinsk Oblast Boris Dubrovsky.

=== Later career ===
At the 2018 World Championships, on 18 November, she was eliminated in the round of 16 (third round) after a close fight against China's Yang Wenlu.[7] She had been exempted from the first round and defeated Elisa Williams of Panama in the second round.

At the 2019 European Games in Minsk, in the 60 kg weight category, she won a bronze medal.
