= Agnes Alexiusson =

Swedish boxer (born 1996)

Personal information
- Nationality: Swedish
- Born: 19 April 1996 (age 30) Stockholm, Sweden

Sport
- Sport: Boxing
Medal record
Women's amateur boxing
Representing Sweden
European Games
Bronze medal – third place	2019 Minsk	Lightweight
Youth Olympic Games
Bronze medal – third place	2014 Nanjing	Lightweight

Agnes Sofia Shine Alexiusson (born 19 April 1996) is a Swedish boxer. She competed in the women's lightweight event at the 2020 Summer Olympics.

She took part in the 2024 2nd World Championship event where she won her first bout with Teretia Toauriri after 1 min 18 seconds.
