= Quanitta Underwood =

American boxer (born 1984)

Personal information
- Born: May 8, 1984 (age 42)
- Height: 1.68 m (5 ft 6 in)

Sport
- Country: United States
- Sport: Boxing
- Event: 60 kg
Medal record
Women's amateur boxing
Representing United States
World Championships
| Bronze medal – third place | 2010 Bridgetown | Lightweight |
World Combat Games
| Gold medal – first place | 2013 Saint Petersburg | Lightweight |
Pan American Sports Festival
| Gold medal – first place | 2014 Mexico | Lightweight |
- Updated on 18 June 2019

Quanitta 'Queen' Underwood (born May 8, 1984) is an American boxer. She discovered the sport at the age of nineteen when she wandered into Cappy's Boxing Gym and Club. Underwood represented the United States at the 2012 Summer Olympics.
