= Jennifer Miranda =

Spanish boxer (born 1986)

Personal information
- Born: Jennifer Miranda Maqueda; 19 August 1986 (age 40) Cádiz, Spain
- Height: 5 ft 6 in (168 cm)
- Weight: Featherweight; Super featherweight

Boxing career
- Stance: Orthodox

Boxing record
- Total fights: 14
- Wins: 13
- Win by KO: 2
- Losses: 1

Jennifer Miranda Maqueda (born 19 August 1986) is a Spanish professional boxer. She is a former WBA interim female featherweight champion and has also challenged for the undisputed female super-featherweight title.

== Amateur career ==
Miranda competed in the 2012 and 2014 AIBA Women's World Boxing Championships. She also competed in the 2015 European Games and the 2016 European Boxing Olympic Qualification Tournament.

== Professional career ==
Miranda faced Spanish female featherweight champion Jessica Sanchez at Nuevo Teatro Alcalá in Madrid on 1 October 2018. After eight rounds, she won the bout by unanimous decision, successfully winning the title.

In her first Spanish female featherweight title defense, Miranda faced Vanesa Caballero at Nuevo Teatro Alcalá in Madrid on 13 May 2019. She won the bout by unanimous decision, making her the first woman to defend that belt.

Miranda faced Jorgelina Guanini for the vacant WBA Intercontinental female featherweight title at Polideportivo Magarinos in Madrid on 12 December 2021. After ten rounds, she won the title by unanimous decision with a score of 99-91, 98-91 and 96-94.

Miranda faced Teresa Almengor for the vacant WBA interim female featherweight title on 20 October 2024. After 10 rounds, she won the bout by unanimous decision to win the title, with two judges gave a score of 100-90 and the other at 100-89.

Miranda faced Alycia Baumgardner for the undisputed female super-featherweight title at Madison Square Garden in New York City on 11 July 2025. She lost the bout by unanimous decision.

In her next fight on 4 October 2026, Miranda got back to winning ways when she knocked out Militza Salazar in the third round of their bout at Teatro Las Vegas in Madrid to claim the vacant WBA Gold International female featherweight title.

== Life outside boxing ==
Miranda appeared in season 5 of Money Heist, portraying soldier Arteche.

== Professional boxing record ==
14 fights	13 wins	1 loss
By knockout	2	0
By decision	11	1

No.	Result	Record	Opponent	Type	Round, time	Date	Location	Notes
14	Win	13–1	Militza Salazar	KO	3 (10)	2026-10-04	Teatro Las Vegas, Madrid, Spain	Won WBA Gold International female featherweight title
13	Loss	12–1	Alycia Baumgardner	UD	10	2025-07-11	Madison Square Garden, New York City, New York, U.S.	For WBA, WBC, IBF, WBO & The Ring female super-featherweight titles
12	Win	12–0	Teresa Almengor	UD	10	2024-10-20	Teatro Las Vegas, Madrid, Spain	Won vacant Interim WBA female featherweight title
11	Win	11–0	Victoria Albons	UD	6	2024-07-20	Teatro Las Vegas, Madrid, Spain	
10	Win	10–0	Lara Altamirano	UD	10	2024-01-07	Cine Callao, Madrid, Spain	Won vacant WBA Gold female featherweight title
9	Win	9–0	Gabriella Mezei	PTS	6	2023-11-23	Pabellon Municipal, Don Álvaro, Spain	
8	Win	8–0	Eva Cantos	MD	6	2022-11-25	Casino Gran Madrid, Torrelodones, Spain	
7	Win	7–0	Sayda Mosquera	UD	10	2022-05-09	Lope de Vega Theatre, Madrid, Spain	Retained WBA Inter-Continental female featherweight title
6	Win	6–0	Jorgelina Guanini	UD	10	2021-12-12	Polideportivo Magarinos, Madrid, Spain	Won vacant WBA Inter-Continental female featherweight title
5	Win	5–0	Kalina Nikolova	KO	3 (4)	2021-07-18	Polideportivo Magarinos, Madrid, Spain	
4	Win	4–0	Vanesa Caballero	UD	6	2019-12-28	Pabellón de La Casilla, Bilbao, Spain	
3	Win	3–0	Vanesa Caballero	UD	8	2019-05-13	Nuevo Teatro Alcalá, Madrid, Spain	Retained Spanish female featherweight title
2	Win	2–0	Jessica Sanchez	UD	8	2018-10-01	Nuevo Teatro Alcalá, Madrid, Spain	Won vacant Spanish female featherweight title
1	Win	1–0	Claire Sammut	UD	4	2018-02-03	Gimnasio Metropolitano, Madrid, Spain	

== See also ==
- List of female boxers

Sporting positions
Regional boxing titles
New title	Spanish featherweight champion July 26, 2020 – 2020; Vacated	Vacant Title next held by Sheila Martinez
New title	WBA Inter-Continental featherweight champion December 11, 2021 – 2022; Vacated	Vacant Title next held by Caroline Veyre
Vacant Title last held by Nina Meinke	WBA Gold featherweight champion January 6, 2024 – October 20, 2024; Won interim title	Vacant Title next held by Emma Gongora
Vacant	WBA Gold International featherweight champion October 4, 2026 – present	Incumbent
World boxing titles
Vacant Title last held by Dahianna Santana	WBA featherweight champion Interim title October 20, 2024 – July 11, 2025	Vacant
