= Yin Junhua =

Chinese boxer (born 1990)

Personal information
- Nationality: Chinese
- Born: 27 August 1990 (age 35) Xingtai, Hebei, China
- Height: 167 cm (5 ft 6 in)
- Weight: 60 kg (132 lb)

Boxing career
Medal record
Women's amateur boxing
Representing China
Olympic Games
Silver medal – second place	2016 Rio de Janeiro	Lightweight
World Championships
Bronze medal – third place	2014 Jeju	Lightweight
Asian Games
Gold medal – first place	2018 Jakarta–Palembang	Featherweight

Yin Junhua (Simplified Chinese:尹 军花, born 27 August 1990) is a Chinese boxer from Xingtai. She won a silver medal in the women's lightweight event at the 2016 Summer Olympics, losing to Estelle Mossely by a split decision in the final.
