= Estelle Mossely =

French boxer (born 1992)

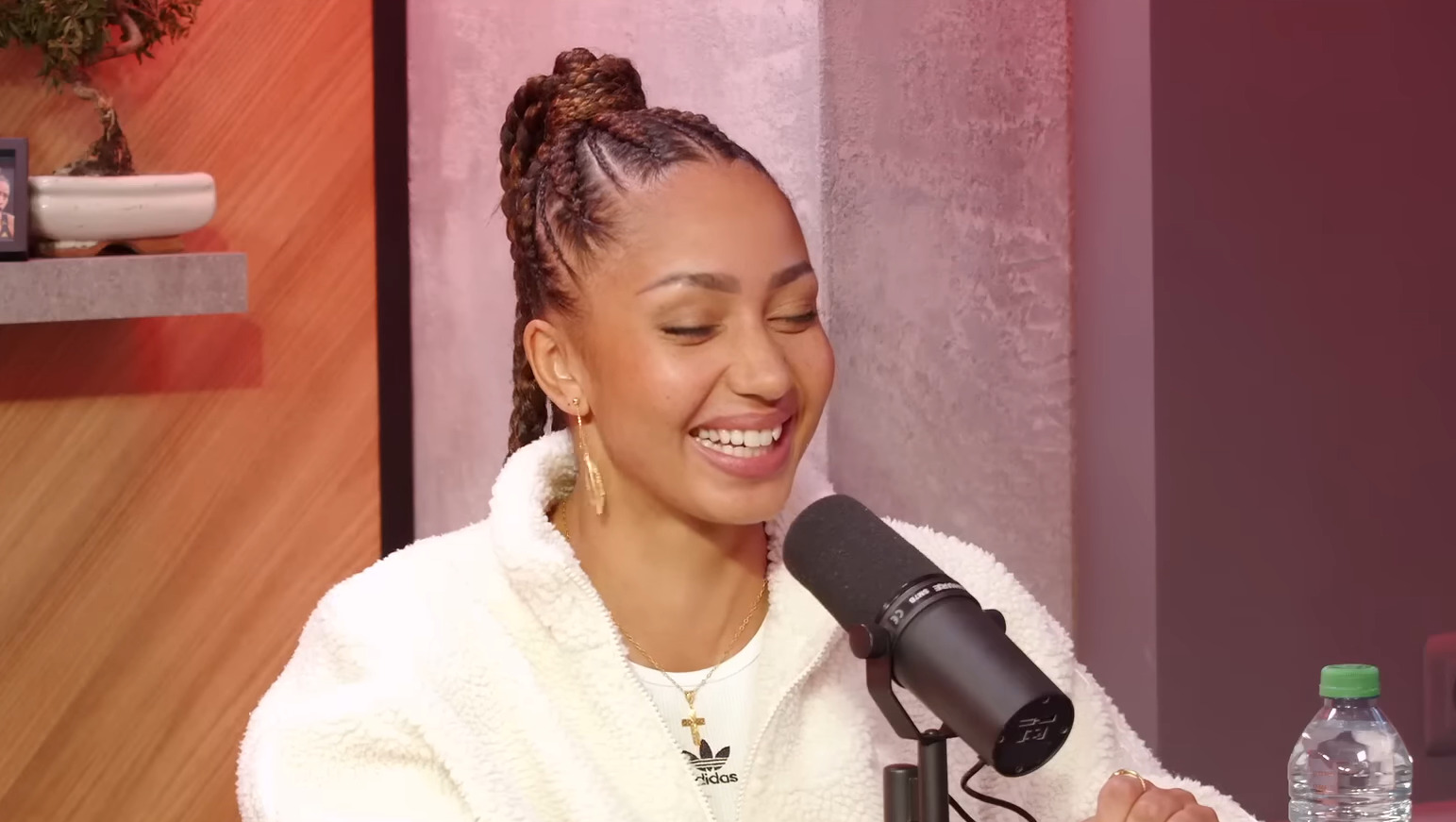

Personal information
- Born: Estelle Mossely Yoka; 19 August 1992 (age 34) Paris, France
- Height: 5 ft 6 in (168 cm)
- Weight: Lightweight

Boxing career
- Stance: Orthodox

Boxing record
- Total fights: 15
- Wins: 14
- Win by KO: 1
- Draws: 1
Medal record
Women's amateur boxing
Representing France
Olympic Games
Gold medal – first place	2016 Rio de Janeiro	Lightweight
World Championships
Gold medal – first place	2016 Astana	Lightweight
Bronze medal – third place	2014 Jeju	Lightweight
European Games
Silver medal – second place	2015 Baku	Lightweight
Bronze medal – third place	2023 Kraków-Małopolska	Lightweight
European Championships
Silver medal – second place	2014 Bucharest	Lightweight
EU Championships
Silver medal – second place	2013 Keszthely	Lightweight

Estelle Mossely is a French professional boxer who formerly held the IBO female lightweight title. As an amateur, she won gold medals at the 2016 Rio Olympics and the 2016 World Championships.

== Life ==
Mossely was born in France to a Congolese father and Ukrainian mother. In 2017, Mossely and Tony Yoka, also a 2016 Olympic Gold medalist and 2015 AIBA world amateur champion from France, gave birth to their son Ali.

She defeated Lucy Wildheart by unanimous decision at Complexe Sportif Chantereyne in Cherbourg on 14 June 2019 to win the vacant IBO female lightweight title.

In 2024, she stood in a bid to become the President of the French Boxing Federation. She was not the only female candidate as Sarah Ourahmoune, the Olympic silver medalist, was also standing. However in November, a month before the election, Ourahmoune withdrew, citing the racist and sexist abuse she had received as the reason.

== Professional boxing record ==
15 fights	14 wins	0 losses
By knockout	1	0
By decision	13	0
Draws	1	

No.	Result	Record	Opponent	Type	Round, time	Date	Location	Notes
15	Win	14–0–1	(Argentina) Karen Elizabeth Carabajal	SD	10	4 Jul 2026	Palais des Sports Robert Oubron, Créteil, Val-de-Marne, France	For WBA female lightweight Interim World title
14	Win	13–0–1	(Colombia) Bexcy Mateus	UD	8	9 Apr 2026	Westfield la Defense, Hauts-de-Seine, Puteaux, France	
13	Win	12-0-1	(Malawi) Ellen Simwaka	UD	8	12 Dec 2025	Dubai Duty Free Tennis Stadium, Dubai, United Arab Emirates	
12	Draw	11–0–1	(Mexico) Magali Rodriguez	UD	10	17 Feb 2023	Dushanbe, Tajikistan	For WBC female lightweight Silver title
11	Win	11–0	(Malawi) Anisha Basheel	UD	10	17 Feb 2023	Salle Wagram, Paris, France	Retained IBO female lightweight title
10	Win	10–0	(Argentina) Yanina del Carmen Lescano	SD	10	18 Mar 2022	Dubai Duty Free Tennis Stadium, Dubai, United Arab Emirates	Retained IBO female lightweight title
9	Win	9–0	(Germany) Verena Kaiser	UD	10	5 Mar 2021	H Arena, Nantes, France	Retained IBO female lightweight title
8	Win	8–0	(France) Emma Gongora	UD	8	27 Nov 2020	H Arena, Nantes, France	
7	Win	7–0	(France) Aurélie Froment	UD	8	25 Sep 2020	La Defense Arena, Nanterre, France	
6	Win	6–0	(Argentina) Ana Romina Guichipani	UD	10	5 Oct 2019	Salle du Casino, Enghien, France	Retained IBO female lightweight title
5	Win	5–0	(Sweden) Lucy Wildheart	UD	10	14 Jun 2019	Complexe Sportif Chantereyne, Cherbourg, France	Won vacant IBO female lightweight title
4	Win	4–0	(Ukraine) Olena Medvedenko	UD	10	16 Mar 2019	Palais des Sports, Toulouse, France	
3	Win	3–0	(Poland) Sylwia Maksym	TKO	3 (8), 0:30	22 Dec 2018	Casino de Deauville, Deauville, France	
2	Win	2–0	(Poland) Karina Kopinska	UD	8	3 Nov 2018	Salle Anova, Alençon, France	
1	Win	1–0	(Montenegro) Aleksandra Vujovic	UD	6	28 Jul 2018	Casino de Deauville, Deauville, France	
