= Mira Potkonen =

Finnish boxer (born 1980)

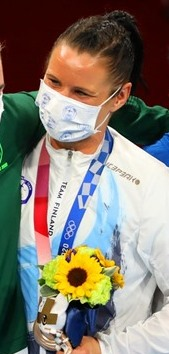
- Potkonen in 2021

Personal information
- Nationality: Finnish
- Born: 17 November 1980 (age 45) Heinävesi, Finland
- Height: 1.65 m (5 ft 5 in)
- Weight: 60 kg (132 lb)

Boxing career
- Weight class: Lightweight

Boxing record
- Total fights: 259
- Wins: 224
- Win by KO: 8
- Losses: 34
- Draws: 1
- No contests: 0
Medal record
Women's amateur boxing
Representing Finland
Olympic Games
Bronze medal – third place	2020 Tokyo	Lightweight
Bronze medal – third place	2016 Rio de Janeiro	Lightweight
World Championships
Bronze medal – third place	2016 Astana	Lightweight
Bronze medal – third place	2019 Ulan-Ude	Lightweight
European Games
Gold medal – first place	2019 Minsk	Lightweight
European Championships
Gold medal – first place	2018 Sofia	Lightweight
Gold medal – first place	2019 Alcobendas	Lightweight
Silver medal – second place	2016 Sofia	Lightweight
European Union Championships
Gold medal – first place	2017 Cascia	Lightweight
Bronze medal – third place	2010 Keszthely	Lightweight
Bronze medal – third place	2011 Katowice	Lightweight
Bronze medal – third place	2013 Keszthely	Lightweight

Mira Marjut Johanna Potkonen (née Miettinen, born 17 November 1980) is a Finnish lightweight boxer. She won a bronze medal in the 60 kg category at the 2016 AIBA Women's World Boxing Championships and the 2016 Summer Olympics, the latter being Finland's only medal at the 2016 Games.

== Career ==
=== 2016 Summer Olympics ===
In the second round of competition, the quarterfinals, of lightweight boxing at the 2016 Summer Olympics in August 2016, Potkonen defeated the 2012 Olympic gold medalist in the event, Katie Taylor and advanced to the next round of competition, the semifinals. By the end of the competition, Potkonen won the bronze medal in the event. It was the only medal for Finland at the 2016 Summer Olympics in any sport, and the first medal in boxing for the country at an Olympic Games since the 1992 Summer Olympics.

=== 2020 Summer Olympics ===
Ahead of the 2020 Summer Olympics, company Gracenote released its medal count predictions for the year's Olympic Games, including a prediction that Potkonen would win the silver medal in lightweight boxing. At the 2020 European Boxing Olympic Qualification Tournament, Potkonen lost to Caroline Dubois in the first round of competition and did not directly qualify for the 2020 Olympic Games. However, she qualified for the 2020 Olympic Games based on ranking. In the Olympics, which took place in 2021 due to COVID-19, Potkonen beat Maïva Hamadouche, Oh Yeon-ji and Esra Yıldız to guarantee a bronze medal. In the semi-finals, Potkonen lost to Beatriz Ferreira, which meant Potkonen got a bronze medal.

== Legacy ==
Potkonen's Olympic bronze medal at the 2016 Summer Olympics in Rio de Janeiro, Brazil made her a flag-bearer symbol for more conventional summer sports in her home country of Finland, where sports such as ice hockey tend to be more popular activities.

In 2020, Potkonen was highlighted by the International Olympic Committee for the impact she has had as an inspiration for young female boxers from nations not as well known for boxing, including teenager Mariah Bahe looking to fight representing the Navajo Nation at the 2024 Summer Olympics.
