= Yana Alekseevna =

Ukrainian-born Azerbaijani boxer (born 1987)

Personal information
- Nationality: Ukrainian; Azerbaijani
- Born: Yana Ivanovna Alekseevna; 30 October 1987 (age 38) Ukraine
- Height: 169 cm (5 ft 7 in)
- Weight: 60 kg (132 lb)

Boxing career
Medal record
Women's amateur boxing
Representing Azerbaijan
World Championships
Silver medal – second place	2014 Jeju City	Lightweight
European Games
Bronze medal – third place	2015 Baku	Lightweight
Representing Ukraine
European Championships
Bronze medal – third place	2007 Vejle	Lightweight
Bronze medal – third place	2009 Mykolaiv	Light welterweight

Yana Ivanivna Alekseevna, also known as Yana Zavyalova (born 30 October 1987) is a Ukrainian-born Azerbaijani boxer. She competed in the women's lightweight event at the 2016 Summer Olympics, where she was defeated in the quarter-finals. In 2014, she won a silver medal at the World Championships.
