= 2014 AIBA Women's World Boxing Championships =

Boxing competitions

- Venue: Halla Gymnasium
- Location: Jeju City, South Korea
- Start date: 13 November 2014
- End date: 25 November 2014
- Competitors: 280 from 67 nations

The 2014 AIBA Women's World Boxing Championships was initially scheduled to be held in Edmonton, Alberta, Canada. from September to October 2014. Boxing Canada withdrew from hosting when it could not find a venue that was available for dates suitable for AIBA, and the competition was held at the Halla Gymnasium of Jeju City, South Korea between 13 and 25 November 2014.

== Schedule ==
10 events were to be held.

| Date | Time | Round |
|---|---|---|
| 16 November 2014 | 20:00 | Preliminaries |
| 17 November 2014 | 14:00 | Preliminaries |
| 17 November 2014 | 19:00 | Preliminaries |
| 18 November 2014 | 14:00 | Preliminaries |
| 18 November 2014 | 19:00 | Preliminaries |
| 19 November 2014 | 14:00 | Preliminaries |
| 19 November 2014 | 19:00 | Preliminaries |
| 20 November 2014 | 14:00 | Preliminaries |
| 20 November 2014 | 19:00 | Preliminaries |
| 21 November 2014 | 14:00 | Quarterfinals |
| 21 November 2014 | 19:00 | Quarterfinals |
| 22 November 2014 | Rest day | |
| 23 November 2014 | 14:00 | Semifinals |
| 23 November 2014 | 19:00 | Semifinals |
| 24 November 2014 | 14:00 | Finals |

== Medal summary ==
=== Medal table ===
* Host nation (South Korea)

| Rank | Nation | Gold | Silver | Bronze | Total |
|---|---|---|---|---|---|
| 1 | Russia (RUS) | 3 | 1 | 1 | 5 |
| 2 | United States (USA) | 2 | 0 | 1 | 3 |
| 3 | China (CHN) | 1 | 1 | 2 | 4 |
| 4 | Kazakhstan (KAZ) | 1 | 1 | 0 | 2 |
| 5 | Bulgaria (BUL) | 1 | 0 | 0 | 1 |
| 5 | Ireland (IRL) | 1 | 0 | 0 | 1 |
| 5 | Panama (PAN) | 1 | 0 | 0 | 1 |
| 8 | England (ENG) | 0 | 2 | 0 | 2 |
| 8 | India (IND) | 0 | 2 | 0 | 2 |
| 10 | Italy (ITA) | 0 | 1 | 2 | 3 |
| 11 | Azerbaijan (AZE) | 0 | 1 | 1 | 2 |
| 12 | Philippines (PHI) | 0 | 1 | 0 | 1 |
| 13 | Turkey (TUR) | 0 | 0 | 3 | 3 |
| 14 | France (FRA) | 0 | 0 | 2 | 2 |
| 14 | Thailand (THA) | 0 | 0 | 2 | 2 |
| 16 | Brazil (BRA) | 0 | 0 | 1 | 1 |
| 16 | Canada (CAN) | 0 | 0 | 1 | 1 |
| 16 | Japan (JPN) | 0 | 0 | 1 | 1 |
| 16 | Netherlands (NED) | 0 | 0 | 1 | 1 |
| 16 | South Korea (KOR)* | 0 | 0 | 1 | 1 |
| 16 | Ukraine (UKR) | 0 | 0 | 1 | 1 |
| Totals (21 entries) | | 10 | 10 | 20 | 40 |

=== Medalists ===
| Event | Gold | Silver | Bronze |
|---|---|---|---|
| Light flyweight (45–48 kg) | Nazym Kyzaibay (KAZ) | Sarjubala Devi (IND) | Chuthamat Raksat (THA) |
| Light flyweight (45–48 kg) | Nazym Kyzaibay (KAZ) | Sarjubala Devi (IND) | Madoka Wada (JPN) |
| Flyweight (51 kg) | Marlen Esparza (USA) | Lisa Whiteside (ENG) | Terry Gordini (ITA) |
| Flyweight (51 kg) | Marlen Esparza (USA) | Lisa Whiteside (ENG) | Clelia Marques (BRA) |
| Bantamweight (54 kg) | Stanimira Petrova (BUL) | Marzia Davide (ITA) | Ayşe Taş (TUR) |
| Bantamweight (54 kg) | Stanimira Petrova (BUL) | Marzia Davide (ITA) | Elena Savelyeva (RUS) |
| Featherweight (57 kg) | Zinaida Dobrynina (RUS) | Nesthy Petecio (PHI) | Tiara Brown (USA) |
| Featherweight (57 kg) | Zinaida Dobrynina (RUS) | Nesthy Petecio (PHI) | Alessia Mesiano (ITA) |
| Lightweight (60 kg) | Katie Taylor (IRL) | Yana Alekseevna (AZE) | Yin Junhua (CHN) |
| Lightweight (60 kg) | Katie Taylor (IRL) | Yana Alekseevna (AZE) | Estelle Mossely (FRA) |
| Light welterweight (64 kg) | Anastasiia Beliakova (RUS) | Sandy Ryan (ENG) | Shim Hee-jung (KOR) |
| Light welterweight (64 kg) | Anastasiia Beliakova (RUS) | Sandy Ryan (ENG) | Sudaporn Seesondee (THA) |
| Welterweight (69 kg) | Atheyna Bylon (PAN) | Saadat Abdulaeva (RUS) | Elena Vystropova (AZE) |
| Welterweight (69 kg) | Atheyna Bylon (PAN) | Saadat Abdulaeva (RUS) | Erika Guerrier (FRA) |
| Middleweight (75 kg) | Claressa Shields (USA) | Li Qian (CHN) | Nouchka Fontijn (NED) |
| Middleweight (75 kg) | Claressa Shields (USA) | Li Qian (CHN) | Ariane Fortin (CAN) |
| Light heavyweight (81 kg) | Yang Xiaoli (CHN) | Saweety (IND) | Anastasiia Chernokolenko (UKR) |
| Light heavyweight (81 kg) | Yang Xiaoli (CHN) | Saweety (IND) | Elif Güneri (TUR) |
| Heavyweight (+81 kg) | Zenfira Magomedalieva (RUS) | Lazzat Kungeibayeva (KAZ) | Wang Shijin (CHN) |
| Heavyweight (+81 kg) | Zenfira Magomedalieva (RUS) | Lazzat Kungeibayeva (KAZ) | Emine Bozduman (TUR) |
