= Adriana Araújo =

Brazilian boxer (born 1981)

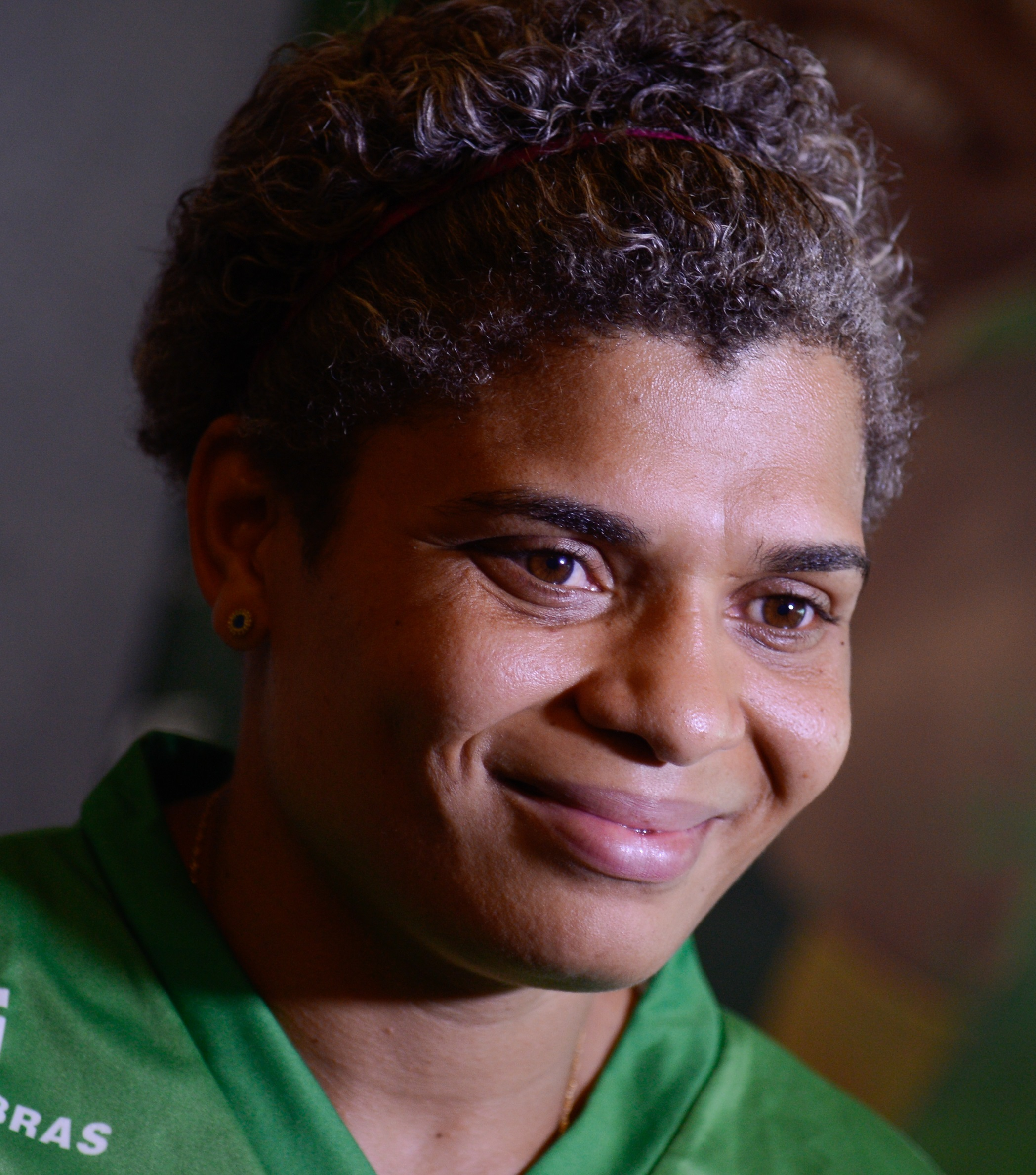
- Araújo in 2016

Personal information
- Other names: PitBull
- Born: Adriana Dos Santos Araújo; 4 November 1981 (age 44) Salvador, Bahia, Brazil
- Height: 167 cm (5 ft 6 in)
- Weight: 60 kg (132 lb)

Boxing career
- Weight class: Light welterweight
- Reach: 68 1/2 in (174 cm)
- Stance: Orthodox

Boxing record
- Total fights: 7
- Wins: 6
- Win by KO: 1
- Losses: 1
Medal record
Women's amateur boxing
Representing Brazil
Olympic Games
Bronze medal – third place	2012 London	Lightweight
South American Games
Gold medal – first place	2010 Medellín	Lightweight
Brazilian National Championships
Gold medal – first place	2009 Aracaju	Lightweight
Gold medal – first place	2015 Balneário Camboriú	Welterweight

Adriana Dos Santos Araújo (Note: This name uses Portuguese naming customs: the first or maternal family name is Dos Santos and the second or paternal family name is Araújo.) (Brazilian Portuguese: [adɾiˈãnaɾɐˈuʒu]; born 4 November 1981) is a Brazilian professional boxer. As an amateur she won a bronze medal in the lightweight division at the 2012 Olympics and qualified for the 2016 Olympics at the same weight.

== Boxing career ==
=== Olympic Games ===
Women's boxing debuted at the 2012 Summer Olympics, with Araújo selected to represent Brazil. She progressed to the semi-finals of the boxing tournament, where she lost on points (11–17) against Sofya Ochigava from Russia. Ochigava was the world number two and went on to win the silver medal in the event. Araújo was awarded bronze alongside Mavzuna Chorieva from Tajikistan, and became the only competitor from a Latin American country to win a medal in any of the women's boxing events. In addition, it was the first time in 44 years that an athlete from Brazil had won a medal in one of the boxing events.

Araújo was disappointed to have only won bronze, although she looked forward to attending the 2016 Summer Olympics in Rio de Janeiro, but said that she would not be competing as she was planning on turning professional before then. However, she has once again been selected to represent Brazil and felt that competing in her home country would provide a boost to her chances of a gold medal. Brazil had used one of their automatic qualification places as the host country for Araújo, meaning that she did not have to qualify. Shortly prior to the games, Araújo was one of 141 torchbearers on the first day of the Brazilian leg of the 2016 Summer Olympics torch relay.

=== Professional career ===
In professional boxing, Araújo was ranked third in the World Boxing Council when she faced Chantelle Cameron in 2020 for the world super lightweight champion title. However, she lost the fight.

She retired from boxing in 2022.

== Professional boxing record ==
7 fights	6 wins	1 loss
By knockout	1	0
By decision	5	1

No.	Result	Record	Opponent	Type	Round, time	Date	Location	Notes
7	Loss	6–1	(United Kingdom) Chantelle Cameron	UD	10	4 Oct 2020	(United Kingdom) Marshall Arena, Milton Keynes, England	For vacant WBC female light-welterweight title
6	Win	6–0	(Venezuela) Estheliz Hernandez	UD	10	29 Feb 2020	Arena de Lutas, São Paulo, Brazil	Retained WBC Silver Female super lightweight title
5	Win	5–0	(Argentina) Claudia Andrea Lopez	UD	10	18 Oct 2019	Arena de Lutas, São Paulo, Brazil	Won vacant WBC Silver Female super lightweight title
4	Win	4–0	(Argentina) Yamila Belen Abellaneda	UD	10	11 Aug 2019	Arena de Lutas, São Paulo, Brazil	Won vacant WBC Latino Female super lightweight title
3	Win	3–0	(Brazil) Elaine Maria de Albuquerque	KO	1 (6), 1:49	31 Mar 2019	Portobello Resort & Safari, Mangaratiba, Brazil	
2	Win	2–0	(Brazil) Vanessa Porto	SD	6	23 Sep 2017	Clube Atlético Juventus, São Paulo, Brazil	
1	Win	1–0	(Brazil) Elaine Maria de Albuquerque	UD	6	17 Jun 2017	Hotel Golden Park, Sorocaba, Brazil	
