= Matoshi =

Matoshi is a Kosovan surname. Notable people with the surname include:

- Lirika Matoshi (born 1996), Kosovan fashion designer
- Teuta Matoshi (born 2004), Kosovan fashion designer
- Valmir Matoshi (born 2003), Kosovan footballer
