= Teuta (disambiguation) =

Teuta (3rd century BC) was queen of the Ardiaei tribe in Illyria.

Teuta may also refer to:

== People ==
- Teuta Arifi (born 1969), Macedonian politician of Albanian origin
- Teuta Cuni (born 1973), retired Swedish boxer
- Teuta Krasniqi (born 1982), Kosovo Albanian actress
- Teuta Kurti (born 1986), Kosovo Albanian singer
- Teuta Matoshi, Kosovo Albanian fashion designer
- Teuta Selimi (born 1976), Kosovo Albanian singer
- Teuta Topi (born 1961), former First Lady of Albania

== Other ==
- BC Teuta Durrës, an Albanian basketball team
- KF Teuta Durrës, an Albanian football team
- Teuta Vissarion, the eponymous character of Bram Stoker's 1909 novel The Lady of the Shroud
