= 2005 Women's European Amateur Boxing Championships =

Boxing competitions

2005 Women's European Boxing Championships
- Host city: Tønsberg
- Country: Norway
- Dates: 8–15 May

The 4th Women's European Amateur Boxing Championships were held in Tønsberg, Norway from May 8 to 15, 2005. This edition of the recurring competition was organised by the European governing body for amateur boxing, EABA. Competitions took place in 13 weight classes.

Russia topped the medals table, as they had done in the three previous editions of these championships. Cecilia Brækhus of Norway was voted best boxer of the tournament.

== Medal table ==
* Host nation (Norway)

Rank	Nation	Gold	Silver	Bronze	Total
1	Russia	5	2	1	8
2	Poland	2	1	1	4
3	Norway*	1	2	1	4
4	Romania	1	1	4	6
5	Italy	1	1	0	2
6	Sweden	1	0	1	2
7	France	1	0	0	1
7	Ireland	1	0	0	1
9	Turkey	0	3	8	11
10	Hungary	0	1	2	3
11	Finland	0	1	1	2
12	Denmark	0	1	0	1
13	Ukraine	0	0	7	7
Totals (13 entries)		13	13	26	52

== Medal winners ==
Event	Gold	Silver	Bronze
Pinweight (46kg)	(Russia) Elena Sabitova	(Romania) Camelia Negrea	(Ukraine) Oksana Shtakun (Turkey) Derya Aktop
Light flyweight (48kg)	(Russia) Olesya Gladkova	(Italy) Laura Tosti	(Romania) Steluța Duță (Hungary) Monika Csik
Flyweight (50kg)	(Italy) Simona Galassi	(Turkey) Hasibe Özer	(Ukraine) Nelly Onishchenko (Russia) Viktoria Usatchenko
Super flyweight (52kg)	(Russia) Sofia Ochigava	(Turkey) Sümeyra Kaya	(Finland) Maarit Teuronen (Ukraine) Viktoria Rudenko
Bantamweight (54kg)	(Poland) Karolina Michalczuk	(Turkey) Seda Aygün	(Romania) Mihaela Cijeschi (Ukraine) Ludmila Hrytsay
Featherweight (57kg)	(France) Myriam Chomaz	(Norway) Henriette Kitel	(Turkey) Nagehan Gül (Sweden) Josefine Tengroth
Lightweight (60kg)	(Republic of Ireland) Katie Taylor	(Finland) Eva Wahlström	(Turkey) Gülsüm Tatar (Norway) Ingrid Egner
Super lightweight (63kg)	(Norway) Cecilia Brækhus	(Russia) Yulia Nemtsova	(Romania) Larisa Pop (Turkey) Kıymet Karpuzoğlu
Welterweight (66kg)	(Russia) Irina Sinetskaya	(Denmark) Yvonne Rasmussen	(Ukraine) Olexandra Kozlan (Turkey) Yeliz Yeşil
Super welterweight (70kg)	(Poland) Karolina Łukasik	(Norway) Siren Søraas	(Turkey) Nurcan Çarkçı (Ukraine) Natalia Perchrest
Middleweight (75kg)	(Sweden) Anna Laurell	(Russia) Maria Yavorskaya	(Turkey) Emine Özkan (Hungary) Anita Ducza
Light heavyweight (80kg)	(Russia) Galina Ivanova	(Poland) Ewa Piwowarska	(Turkey) Selma Yağcı (Romania) Gabriela Mitran
Heavyweight (86kg)	(Romania) Adriana Hosu	(Hungary) Mária Kovács	(Ukraine) Anna Zyelyuk (Poland) Paulina Szmidt
