= Erkoç =

Erkoç is a Turkish surname. Notable people with the surname include:

- Fatih Erkoç (born 1953), Turkish jazz and pop music singer and composer
- Hasibe Erkoç, Turkish boxer
- Bülent Ersoy (born Erkoç), Turkish singer and actress
