= Eva Wahlström =

Finnish boxer (born 1980)

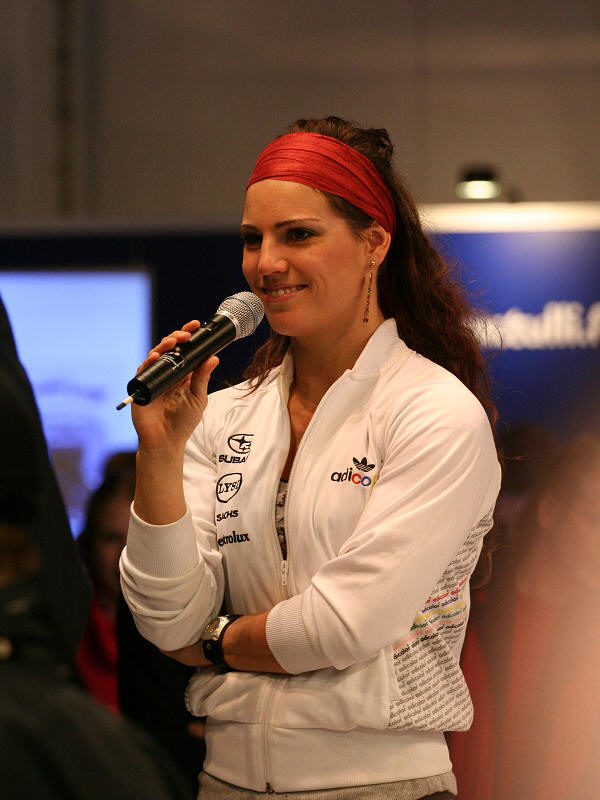
- Wahlström in 2006

Personal information
- Nationality: Finnish
- Born: Eva Ulrika Birgitta Wahlström; 30 October 1980 (age 45) Loviisa, Finland
- Height: 1.68 m (5 ft 6 in)
- Weight: Super-featherweight; Lightweight

Boxing career
- Stance: Orthodox

Boxing record
- Total fights: 27
- Wins: 23
- Win by KO: 3
- Losses: 2
- Draws: 2
Medal record
Women's amateur boxing
Finnish national championships
Gold medal – first place	1999–2008 (10×)	Lightweight
Representing Finland
Nordic Championships
Gold medal – first place	2003–05 (3×), 2007	Lightweight
European Championships
Silver medal – second place	2004 Riccione	Lightweight
Silver medal – second place	2005 Tønsberg	Lightweight
Bronze medal – third place	2001 Saint-Amand-les-Eaux	Light-welterweight

Eva Ulrika Birgitta Räsänen (née Wahlström; born 30 October 1980) is a Finnish former professional boxer who competed from 2010 to 2020. She held the WBC female super-featherweight title from 2015 to 2020 and at regional level the European female super-featherweight title from 2012 to 2015. As an amateur she won a silver medal in the lightweight division at the 2004 and 2005 Women's European Championships, and represented Finland at the 2006 Women's World Championships. She is the most successful professional boxer from Finland to date, being the first and only Finn to have won a world title from one of the four major boxing sanctioning bodies. Wahlström is a member of the International Women's Boxing Hall of Fame.

== Amateur career ==
Wahlström began boxing from around the age of 15–16, representing Loviisan Riento sports club. She went on to have a highly successful amateur career, winning ten consecutive gold medals at the Finnish national championships (1999–2008), gold four times at the Nordic Championships (2003–05, 2007) and silver twice at the European Championships (2004 and 2005).

== Professional career ==
After her lengthy amateur career, Wahlström made her professional debut on 26 March 2010, scoring a third-round stoppage over Irina Boldea. On 21 May 2011, Wahlström fought Milena Koleva to a six-round split draw. Wahlström won her first major regional championship—the vacant European female super-featherweight title—on 31 March 2012, defeating Agota Ilko via a ten-round unanimous decision (UD).

During the summer of 2012, Wahlström was struck with a pulmonary embolism, which required career-threatening medication. Having spent most of 2013 recovering, she returned to the ring on 7 December to face decorated former kickboxing, K-1 and Muay Thai medallist Anna Sikora, whom she defeated with ease in a six-round UD. Wahlström made one defence of her European title on 16 August 2014, winning a ten-round UD over Djemilla Gontaruk.

On 25 April 2015, Wahlström defeated Natalia Vanesa del Valle Aguirre in a ten-round UD. In doing so, she won the vacant WBC female super-featherweight title and became the first Finnish boxer in history to win a major world title. Her first defence of the title was a successful one, as she won a ten-round UD over Dahiana Santana on 18 March 2016.

In September 2018, it was announced that Walhström would face Firuza Sharipova in defence of her WBC title, as well as Sharipova's IBO title. However, due to Sharipova's injury, the fight was pushed back until eventually canceled. Instead, Wahlström faced Irish Katie Taylor on 15 December 2018 at Madison Square Garden in the New York City. Taylor defended her WBA and IBF female lightweight titles against Wahlström, who had to change her weight class for the match and thus did not have her WBC super-featherweight title on the line. Taylor won all ten rounds.

In August 2019, Wahlström retained her WBC super-featherweight title in a close match with Ronica Jeffrey.

Wahlström lost her title to Terri Harper in February 2020.

In March 2020, Wahlström confirmed media reports that she had retired. Out of 27 professional fights, she had won 23, lost two and two were draws.

In October 2025, she was named among the inductees for the 2026 International Women's Boxing Hall of Fame class.

== Personal life ==
Wahlström is a Finland-Swede. She has two older brothers.

Wahlström married Finnish professional boxer, Niklas Räsänen, in September 2016. They have a son (born 2021) and both have a child from their previous relationships. Eva's older son, Leon (born 2009), won a bronze medal at the national junior boxing championships. The family resides in Porvoo.

Outside of boxing, Wahlström made an appearance as a personal trainer to contestants in the Finnish reality television series Suurin pudottaja (in the spring 2006 and autumn 2007 seasons), a Finnish version of The Biggest Loser, with swimmer Jani Sievinen.

== Professional boxing record ==
27 fights	23 wins	2 losses
By knockout	3	0
By decision	20	2
Draws	2	

No.	Result	Record	Opponent	Type	Round, time	Date	Location	Notes
27	Loss	23–2–2	Terri Harper	UD	10	8 Feb 2020	FlyDSA Arena, Sheffield, England	Lost WBC female super-featherweight title; For IBO female super-featherweight title
26	Win	23–1–2	Consolata Musanga	UD	8	30 Nov 2019	Salohalli, Salo, Finland	
25	Draw	22–1–2	Ronica Jeffrey	SD	10	2 Aug 2019	Thomas & Mack Center, Paradise, Nevada, US	Retained WBC female super-featherweight title
24	Loss	22–1–1	Katie Taylor	UD	10	15 Dec 2018	Madison Square Garden, New York City, New York, US	For WBA and IBF female lightweight titles
23	Win	22–0–1	Melissa St. Vil	UD	10	6 Apr 2018	Kulttuuritalo, Helsinki, Finland	Retained WBC female super-featherweight title
22	Win	21–0–1	Irma Balijagic Adler	UD	8	26 Aug 2017	Olavinlinna, Savonlinna, Finland	
21	Win	20–0–1	Mayra Alejandra Gomez	UD	10	6 May 2017	Gatorade Center, Turku, Finland	Retained WBC female super-featherweight title
20	Win	19–0–1	Anahí Ester Sánchez	UD	10	17 Dec 2016	Hartwall Arena, Helsinki, Finland	Retained WBC female super-featherweight title
19	Win	18–0–1	Jasmina Nadj	UD	8	13 Aug 2016	Olavinlinna, Savonlinna, Finland	
18	Win	17–0–1	Dahiana Santana	UD	10	18 Mar 2016	Barona Areena, Espoo, Finland	Retained WBC female super-featherweight title
17	Win	16–0–1	Gina Chamie	UD	8	21 Nov 2015	Töölö Sports Hall, Helsinki, Finland	
16	Win	15–0–1	Everline Odero	UD	8	8 Aug 2015	Savonlinna, Finland	
15	Win	14–0–1	Natalia Vanesa del Valle Aguirre	UD	10	25 Apr 2015	Hartwall Arena, Helsinki, Finland	Won vacant WBC female super-featherweight title
14	Win	13–0–1	Fatuma Zarika	UD	8	15 Nov 2014	Steveco Areena, Kotka, Finland	
13	Win	12–0–1	Halanna Dos Santos	UD	6	20 Sep 2014	Hartwall Arena, Helsinki, Finland	
12	Win	11–0–1	Djemilla Gontaruk	UD	10	16 Aug 2014	Olavinlinna, Savonlinna, Finland	Retained European female super-featherweight title
11	Win	10–0–1	Karina Kopinska	UD	6	9 May 2014	Urheilutalo, Helsinki, Finland	
10	Win	9–0–1	Anna Sikora	UD	6	7 Dec 2013	Barona Areena, Espoo, Finland	
9	Win	8–0–1	Agota Ilko	UD	10	31 Mar 2012	Barona Areena, Espoo, Finland	Won vacant European female super-featherweight title
8	Win	7–0–1	Zsofia Bedo	UD	8	21 Jan 2012	Seinäjoki Areena, Seinäjoki, Finland	
7	Win	6–0–1	Marisol Reyes	TKO	7 (8), 0:25	23 Sep 2011	Ice Hall, Helsinki, Finland	
6	Draw	5–0–1	Milena Koleva	SD	6	21 May 2011	Seinäjoki Areena, Seinäjoki, Finland	
5	Win	5–0	Kristine Shergold	UD	6	4 Mar 2011	Hartwall Arena, Helsinki, Finland	
4	Win	4–0	Nacera Baghdad	UD	6	27 Nov 2010	Hartwall Arena, Helsinki, Finland	
3	Win	3–0	Nadezhda Manakova	RTD	5 (6), 0:01	4 Sep 2010	Töölö Sports Hall, Helsinki, Finland	
2	Win	2–0	Zsofia Bedo	UD	4	11 May 2010	Varuboden Areena, Kirkkonummi, Finland	
1	Win	1–0	Irina Boldea	TKO	3 (4), 0:47	26 Mar 2010	Töölö Sports Hall, Helsinki, Finland	

Sporting positions
Regional boxing titles
Vacant Title last held by Myriam Chomaz	European female super-featherweight champion 31 March 2012 – April 2015; Vacated	Vacant Title next held by Angelique Duchemin
World boxing titles
Vacant Title last held by Diana Prazak	WBC female super-featherweight champion 25 April 2015 – 8 February 2020	Succeeded by Terri Harper
