= Kitel =

Kitel is a surname. Notable people with the surname include:

- Henriette Kitel (born 1973), Norwegian amateur boxer and kickboxer
- Martin Kitel (born 1966), Swedish boxer
