= Karolina Koszewska =

Polish boxer (born 1982)

Personal information
- Nationality: Polish
- Born: 7 January 1982 (age 44)

Sport
- Sport: Boxing
Medal record
Women's amateur boxing
Representing Poland
European Games
Gold medal – first place	2019 Minsk	Welterweight
European Championships
Gold medal – first place	2005 Tønsberg	Super welterweight
Silver medal – second place	2003 Pécs	Super welterweight
Bronze medal – third place	2004 Riccione	Super welterweight

Karolina Koszewska, née Łukasik (born 7 January 1982) is a Polish boxer. She competed in the women's welterweight event at the 2020 Summer Olympics.
