= 2003 Women's European Amateur Boxing Championships =

Boxing competitions

2003 Women's European Boxing Championships
- Host city: Pecs
- Country: Hungary
- Dates: 11–17 May

The 2nd Women's European Amateur Boxing Championships were held in Pécs, Hungary from May 11 to 17, 2003. This edition of the biennial competition was organised by the European governing body for amateur boxing, EABA. Competitions took place in 13 weight classes.

Russia were again top medal winners, but her dominance was much reduced since the 2001 Women's European Amateur Boxing Championships.

== Medal table ==
* Host nation (Hungary)

Rank	Nation	Gold	Silver	Bronze	Total
1	Russia	3	3	3	9
2	Ukraine	2	2	3	7
3	Turkey	2	1	2	5
4	Italy	2	0	2	4
5	Hungary*	1	3	3	7
6	France	1	0	4	5
7	Romania	1	0	3	4
8	Norway	1	0	2	3
9	Poland	0	2	0	2
10	Germany	0	1	1	2
10	Sweden	0	1	1	2
12	Finland	0	0	1	1
12	Greece	0	0	1	1
Totals (13 entries)		13	13	26	52

== Medal winners ==
Event	Gold	Silver	Bronze
Pinweight (46kg)	(Romania) Camelia Negrea	(Russia) Jelena Sabitowa	(Hungary) Nikolett Simon (Turkey) Derya Aktop
Light flyweight (48kg)	(Turkey) Hülya Şahin	(Hungary) Monika Csik	(Italy) Laura Tosti (Ukraine) Swietłana Miroszniczenko
Flyweight (50kg)	(Italy) Simona Galassi	(Turkey) Hasibe Özer	(Ukraine) Tatiana Lebiediewa (France) Virginie Nave
Super flyweight (52kg)	(Ukraine) Wiktoria Rudenko	(Sweden) Katrin Enoksson	(Germany) Dagmar Koch (Italy) Angela Cannizzaro
Bantamweight (54kg)	(Italy) Marzia Davide	(Russia) Jelena Karpaczewa	(France) Ahlam Assalam (Norway) Kari Jensen
Featherweight (57kg)	(Norway) Henriette Kitel	(Poland) Karolina Michalczuk	(France) Myriam Chomaz (Russia) Swietłana Kułakowa
Lightweight (60kg)	(Russia) Tatyana Chalaya	(Germany) Sonja Durr	(Norway) Ingrid Hegle (Greece) Areti Mastrodouka
Super lightweight (63kg)	(France) Myriam Lamare	(Russia) Maria Karłowa	(Ukraine) Anastasja Sawinowa (Finland) Terhi Lukka
Welterweight (66kg)	(Russia) Irina Sinieckaja	(Ukraine) Aleksandra Kozlan	(Turkey) Kıymet Karpuzoğlu (Hungary) Csilla Csejtei
Super welterweight (70kg)	(Turkey) Nurcan Çarkçı	(Poland) Karolina Łukasik	(Hungary) Ivett Pruzsinszky (France) Emilie Cuenin
Middleweight (75kg)	(Russia) Natalia Ragozina	(Hungary) Anita Ducza	(Romania) Oana Strugaru (Sweden) Anna Laurell
Light heavyweight (80kg)	(Ukraine) Anżela Torska	(Hungary) Viktoria Kovacs	(Romania) Mihaela Marcut (Russia) Swietłana Andriejewa
Heavyweight (86kg)	(Hungary) Mária Kovács	(Ukraine) Julia Gostraja	(Russia) Maria Jaroskaja (Romania) Adina Hossu
