= 2001 Women's World Amateur Boxing Championships =

Boxing competitions

- Location: Scranton, Pennsylvania
- Dates: October 21–27, 2001

The 2001 Women's World Amateur Boxing Championships was an international women's boxing competition hosted by the United States from October 21 to 27 2001 in Scranton, Pennsylvania. The competition was the first women's world amateur boxing championships.

== Results ==
Bronze medals are awarded to both losing semi-finalists.

2001 World Women's Boxing Championship
Weight	Gold	Silver	Bronze	
45 kg	(Russia) Yelena Sabitova	(Hungary) Maria Norozenik	(Romania) Camelia Negrea	(Canada) Kim Peturson
48 kg	(Turkey) Hülya Şahin	(India) Mary Kom	(Canada) Jamie Behl	(United States) Carina Moreno
51 kg	(Italy) Simona Galassi	(Canada) Tammy DeLaforest	(Sweden) Katrin Enoksson	(Romania) Diana Ungureanu
54 kg	(Russia) Yelena Karpecheva	(France) Audrey Garcia	(Canada) Wendy Broad	(Norway) Renate Medby
57 kg	(China) Zhang Maomao	(Norway) Henriette Birkeland	(Canada) Jeannine Garside	(Denmark) Alexandra Matheus
60 kg	(Canada) Crystelle Samson	(Russia) Tatyana Chalaya	(Sweden) Teuta Cuni	(United States) Amber Gideon
63.5 kg	(Sweden) Frida Wallberg	(France) Myriam Lamare	(Italy) Cristina Cerpi	(Canada) Donna Mancuso
67 kg	(Russia) Irina Sinetskaya	(Jamaica) Natalie Brown	(New Zealand) Melanie Horne	(Canada) Tristan Whiston
71 kg	(Hungary) Ivett Pruzsinszky	Not awarded	(Turkey) Nurcan Çarkçı	(Moldova) Irina Smirnova
75 kg	(Sweden) Anna Laurell	(Hungary) Anita Ducza	(Russia) Svetlana Andreyeva	(China) Guo Shuai
81 kg	(Russia) Olga Domouladzhanova	(Hungary) Viktoria Kovacs	(Canada) Tanya Fowler	(United States) Faye Jacobs-Hollins
90 kg	(United States) Devonne Canady	(Hungary) Mária Kovács	(Russia) Mariya Reingard	(Turkey) Selma Yağcı

- 71 kg Drapeau Russian Natalya Kolpakova gain silver medals but disqualified and deprived of their silver medals in 2001 Women's World Amateur Boxing Championships, which were not transferred to other athletes.

== Medal count table ==
2001 World Women's Boxing Championship
Pos	Country	Gold	Silver	Bronze	Total
1	Russia	4	1	2	7
2	Sweden	2		2	4
3	Hungary	1	4		5
4	Canada	1	1	7	9
5	United States	1		3	4
6	Turkey	1		2	3
7	China	1		1	2
7=	Italy	1		1	2
9	France		2		2
10	Norway		1	1	2
11	India		1		1
11=	Jamaica		1		1
13	Romania			2	2
14	Denmark			1	1
14=	Moldova			1	1
14=	New Zealand			1	1
	Total	12	11	24	47
