= Turkey at the 2006 World Women's Boxing Championship =

Boxing competitions

Turkey (listed as TUR) participated in the 4th World Women’s Boxing Championships held from November 18 to 23, 2006 in New Delhi, India. Its team of twelve women boxers, won two medals (one gold and one bronze), placing Turkey 5th in the unofficial medal table.

== Participants ==
- 46 kg - Derya Aktop, Ankara (TSE)
- 48 kg - Gülseda Başıbütün, Ankara
- 50 kg - Hasibe Erkoç, Ankara (TSE)
- 52 kg - Sümeyra Kaya, Istanbul (Fenerbahçe)
- 54 kg - Sabriye Şengül, Trabzon
- 57 kg - Nagehan Gül, Kocaeli
- 63 kg - Perihan Vurkan, Çankırı
- 66 kg - Yeliz Yeşil, Ordu
- 70 kg - Nurcan Çarkçı, Istanbul
- 75 kg - Hatice Aliç, İzmir
- 80 kg - Selma Yağcı, Denizli
- 86 kg - Şemsi Yaralı, Ankara (TSE)

Technical director: Selahattin Başaran, Ankara

== Medals ==
Weight	Name	Gold	Silver	Bronze
50 kg	Hasibe Erkoç	1		
86 kg	Şemsi Yaralı			1
	Total	1	0	1

== Results by event ==
46 kg
November 19, 2006	N Branbayeva	12 - 8	Derya Aktop
48 kg
November 19, 2006	Gülseda Başıbütün	23 - 24	Marlen Esparza
50 kg
November 20, 2006	Hasibe Erkoç	6 - 4	Chen Chia Ling
November 22, 2006 SF	Chhoutu Loura	8 - 17	Hasibe Erkoç
November 23, 2006 F	Hasibe Erkoç	18 - 12	Siyuan Li
52 kg
November 20, 2006	Sümeyra Kaya	6 - 18	Sarita Devi
54 kg
November 18, 2006	E Klinefelter	7 - 20	Sabriye Şengül
November 20, 2006	Sabriye Şengül	13 - 22	L Hrytsay
57 kg
November 18, 2006	O Sydorenko	8 - 26	Nagehan Gül
November 19, 2006	Nagehan Gül	26 - 12	Myriam Dellal
November 21, 2006	Mihaela Cijevschi	20 - 12	Nagehan Gül
63 kg
November 20, 2006	Perihan Vurkan	2 - 17	Klara Svensson
66 kg
November 20, 2006	Aruna Mishra	17 - 7	Yeliz Yeşil
70 kg
November 18, 2006	Nurcan Çarkçı	RSCOS	Engi Saad M
November 20, 2006	Olga S	20 - 14	Nurcan Çarkçı
75 kg
November 18, 2006	Hatice Aliç	RSC	S Elhaddad
November 18, 2006	Jinzi Li	16 - 1	Hatice Aliç
86 kg
November 20, 2006	Şemsi Yaralı	21 - 7	Jyotsna
November 22, 2006 SF	Elena Surkova	10 - 9	Şemsi Yaralı

Abbreviations

- SF Semi-finals
- F Finals
