= Henriette Kitel =

Norwegian amateur boxer and kickboxer

Medal record

World Amateur Championships
Silver medal – second place	2001 Scranton	Featherweight
Silver medal – second place	2002 Antalya	Featherweight

European Amateur Championships
Gold medal – first place	2001 Valenciennes	Featherweight
Gold medal – first place	2003 Pécs	Featherweight
Silver medal – second place	2005 Tønsberg	Flyweight

Henriette Birkeland Kitel (born 25 July 1973) born is a Norwegian amateur boxer and kickboxer.

She was born in Ålesund, but is from Molde where she grew up. She took up amateur boxing in the club Moldekameratene.

In kickboxing, she won silver at the 1996 European Championships, bronze at the 1997 World Championships and gold at the 1999 World Championships. She represented the club Fighter KBK.

Competing in the featherweight class (57kg), she won the 2001 Women's European Amateur Boxing Championships before reaching the final of the 2001 Women's World Amateur Boxing Championships. Here, she lost to Zhang Maomao and took the silver medal. Another silver followed at the 2002 Women's World Amateur Boxing Championships, where Jo Pok-sun won 16–7 in the final.

Kitel won her second European gold medal at the 2003 Women's European Amateur Boxing Championships in Pécs. Some discussed her prospects for professional boxing, but Kitel missed the 2004 season due to childbirth. She gave birth to twin boys. Her boxing comeback in the January 2005 Norway Box Cup ended in victory. Nevertheless, she considered ending her career.

There had been discussion about awarding the 2003 European Championships to Norway, meaning that Kitel had the chance to defend her gold medal, but eventually, Tønsberg hosted the 2005 Women's European Amateur Boxing Championships. She would therefore try to take her third title. However, she lost the final to Myriam Chomaz. Kitel went to the 2005 Women's World Amateur Boxing Championships, but was eliminated early.

The King's Cup to the best overall boxer at the Norwegian championships had been instituted in 2004. Kitel won the King's Cup in 2005.

== Personal life ==
As a young woman, she spent one year as an au pair in Thessaloniki. She learned some Greek.

She married Martin Kitel, who was also her boxing coach.

She worked as a hotel director of Thon Hotel Moldefjord until 2020, when she was hired as managing director of a new Tesla dealership in Molde. She became chairman of her boxing club Moldekameratene. She is also a supporter of Molde FK.
