= Cathy Brown (boxer) =

English boxer

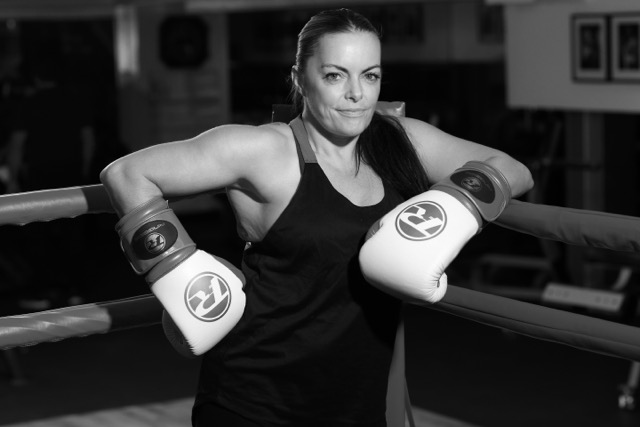
- Brown in 2016
- Born: 28 July 1970 (age 56); Leeds, England
- Other names: The Bitch
- Height: 5 ft 2 in (157 cm)
- Division: Light-flyweight; Flyweight; Bantamweight
- Reach: 70 in (180 cm)

Professional boxing record
- Total: 21
- Wins: 15
- By knockout: 6
- Losses: 6

Kickboxing record
- Total: 25
- Wins: 25

Other information
- Boxing record from BoxRec

Cathy Brown (born 28 July 1970) is a British sports coach and former professional boxer who competed from 1998 to 2006. She challenged for multiple world championships during her career; the WIBF bantamweight title twice in 2002 and 2004; the WIBF flyweight title in 2003; and the WBC female flyweight title in 2005. At regional level, she challenged once for the European female flyweight title in 2003.

She regularly writes columns for Men's Health and Women's Health magazines.

== Background ==
Brown was born on 28 July 1970. She was put into a Catholic Care orphanage until she was adopted at an early age by her adoptive parents and raised in Lanchester, Durham. In 1992 she moved to London to pursue her photographic career as a Forensic Photographer, as which she worked until 1998.

== Early career ==
She started Kickboxing in 1992 as a hobby and only after three months her trainer suggested that she should enter her first competition. She remained undefeated for 25 fights, winning both the BKBU and WBF British Kick Boxing title.

== Boxing career ==
Brown received her professional boxing license in August 1998. She was only the 2nd woman in the UK to receive a professional boxing licence.

Her first fight was a points win against Veerle Braspenningx from Belgium in Oct 1999 and won the WBF European flyweight title in July 2000.

In June 2002, she went for the WIBF International bantamweight title against Alina Shaternikiova, but lost.

She fought Stephanie Bianchini for the European female flyweight title in December 2003, however, controversially lost on points. She fought a rematch against Stephanie Bianchini for the WBC female flyweight title in August 2005 in Italy, but lost again on points.

On 24 September 2006, Brown won the English female bantamweight title when she defeated Juliette Winter by a ten-round 97–94 decision in a rematch of their 2003 four-rounder. With the win, Brown became the first female champion sanctioned by the British Boxing Board of Control. After the fight, she stated that she would retire from competition because of persistent wrist and neck injuries.

== Professional boxing record ==
21 fights	15 wins	6 losses
By knockout	6	0
By decision	9	6

No.	Result	Record	Opponent	Type	Round, time	Date	Location	Notes
21	Win	13-8	Juliette Winter	UD		24 September 2006	York Hall, Bethnal Green, London, United Kingdom	BBBofC English Female Bantamweight Title
20	Loss	13-7	Julia Sahin	UD		8 April 2006	Ostseehalle, Kiel, Schleswig-Holstein, Germany	WIBF Women's International Boxing Federation light flyweight title
19	Loss	13-6	Stefania Bianchini	UD		7 August 2005	Pala Flaminio, Rimini, Emilia Romagna, Italy	WBC female flyweight title
18	Win	13-5	Svetla Taskova			12 June 2005	Equinox Nightclub, Leicester Square, London, United Kingdom	
17	Win	12-5	Viktoria Varga			2 December 2004	National Sports Centre, Crystal Palace, London, United Kingdom	
16	Loss	11-5	Bettina Csabi	UD		6 November 2004	Dr.Papp Laszlo Sporthall, Szentes, Hungary	WIBF bantamweight title AND Global Boxing Union Female bantamweight title
15	Win	11-4	Stefania Bianchini			17 December 2003	Palasport, Bergamo, Lombardia, Italy	EBU female flyweight title
14	Loss	10-4	Regina Halmich	UD		26 April 2003	Sport and Congress Center, Schwerin, Mecklenburg-Vorpommern, Germany	WIBF Women's International Boxing Federation flyweight title
13	Win	10-3	Juliette Winter			20 March 2003	Porchester Hall, Queensway, London, United Kingdom	
12	Win	9-3	Monika Petrova			30 October 2002	Equinox Nightclub, Leicester Square, London, United Kingdom	
11	Loss	8-3	Alina Shaternikova			13 June 2002	Equinox Nightclub, Leicester Square, London, United Kingdom	WIBF Women's International Boxing Federation bantamweight title
10	Win	8-2	Svetla Taskova			13 March 2002	Marriott Hotel, Mayfair, London, United Kingdom	
9	Win	7-2	(Australia) Iliana Boneva			13 December 2001	Equinox Nightclub, Leicester Square, London, United Kingdom	
8	Win	6-2	Audrey Guthrie			22 November 2001	Grosvenor House, Mayfair, London, United Kingdom	WBF European Flyweight Title
7	Win	5-2	Ramona Gughie			16 June 2001	Conference Centre, Wembley, London, United Kingdom	
6	Loss	5-1	Oksana Vasilieva			26 April 2001	Royal Gardens Hotel, Kensington, London, United Kingdom	
5	Win	5-0	Marietta Ivanova			28 February 2001	Royal Gardens Hotel, Kensington, London, United Kingdom	
4	Win	4-0	Viktoria Varga			31 October 2000	Novotel Hotel, Hammersmith, London, United Kingdom	
3	Win	3-0	(Australia) Jane Wild			1 July 2000	Elephant & Castle Centre, Southwark, London, United Kingdom	WBF European Flyweight Title
2	Win	2-0	Veerle Braspenningx	UD		5 February 2000		
1	Win	1–0	(United Kingdom) Veerle Braspenningx	UD	4	1999-10-31	David Lloyd Tennis Centre, Raynes Park, London, United Kingdom	Professional Debut

== Current activities ==
Brown is currently focusing on her coaching career as a boxing coach and Cognitive Behavioural Therapist at the Third Space gym. She has participated in various challenges such as sailing across the Atlantic in a world record attempt and took part in a 120 km running and climbing event for Sparks Charity.

As an ambassador for The Lotus Flower Charity, Brown visited refugee camps in Iraq in 2019 to teach Yazidi women how to box for empowerment. She taught 3 women how to coach boxing using the Boxology® boxing course. These women have carried on teaching boxing in the camps, creating a solid community of sisterhood.

She created her own charitable company called Headguard® as The Lotus Flower project was extremely successful and the women are still coaching to this day. Headguard fundraise in the UK and work with small 'on ground' NGO's in different countries where women are treated badly. They visited Nepal in 2022 and worked with Raksha Nepal charity, coaching 7 girls to become boxing coaches to the rest of the girls in the safe house in Kathmandu (currently 80+ young girls).

Cathy has directed and produced a documentary showcasing Headguards work and how boxing is an amazing resource for mental health. She also documents the atrocious stories the girls have endured. The documentary is called Raksha Girls. Cathy won Best Female Filmmaker 2026 award in the California Film Festival.
