= Svetlana Kulakova =

Russian boxer and kickboxer (born 1982)

Personal information
- Native name: Светлана Александровна Кулакова
- Nickname: Kulak
- Born: 13 December 1982 (age 43) Sarov, Russia
- Height: 5 ft 8 in (173 cm)
- Weight: Super-lightweight

Boxing career
- Stance: Orthodox

Boxing record
- Total fights: 14
- Wins: 13
- Win by KO: 1
- Draws: 1
Medal record
Women's amateur boxing
Representing Russia
Women's World Amateur Boxing Championships
Bronze medal – third place	2002 Antalya	57kg
Women's kickboxing
Representing Russia
WAKO Amateur European Championships
Gold medal – first place	2006 Skopje	70kg

Svetlana Kulakova (born 13 December 1982) is a Russian former professional boxer and amateur kickboxer. She won the vacant WBA Interim female super-lightweight title by defeating Judy Waguthii on a unanimous decision in Volgograd, Russia, on 24 August 2013. Kulakova successfully defended the title via unanimous decision against Florence Muthoni in Barnaul, Russia, on 15 November 2013. She challenged full WBA female super-lightweight champion Ana Laura Esteche in Mytishchi, Russia, on 1 June 2014, but the fight ended in a split draw. Kulakova won the vacant IBO female super-lightweight title by beating Prisca Vicot on a unanimous decision in Moscow, Russia, on 3 December 2016. She made one defense of the title in a rematch against Judy Waguthii in Moscow on 27 November 2017, which she won by split decision.
