= Juliette Winter =

British boxer

Personal information
- Nationality: British
- Born: Juliette Anne Winter; 21 February 1971 (age 55) Whitehaven, United Kingdom
- Height: 5 ft 6 in (168 cm)
- Weight: Super flyweight Bantamweight; Super bantamweight

Boxing career
- Stance: Orthodox

Boxing record
- Total fights: 13
- Wins: 4
- Losses: 8
- Draws: 1

Juliette Anne Winter (born February 21, 1971, in Whitehaven, United Kingdom) is an English professional boxer who was the first woman to win a BBBofC-sanctioned professional women's title on 23 July 2006, defeating former ABA super flyweight champion Shanee Martin in an eight-round fight.

Born in Whitehaven, Cumbria, Winter studied Film and Television Studies at the University of Derby whilst establishing a career in full-contact kickboxing. Winter trained with Jane Couch, MBE and Tex Woodward in Bristol. She first began training with former British middleweight champion Neville Brown and heavyweight boxer Clifton Mitchell. Her début fight was against super bantamweight boxer Sara Hall in 2001. After defeating Cathy Brown in 2003 at bantamweight, Winter continued to box around Germany, encountering Esther Schouten and Elina Tissen before returning to England and earning the "British Masters" super flyweight title. Winter currently boxes for TKO Boxing in London and works as a personal trainer and film maker.

== Professional boxing record ==
| 13 fights | 4 wins | 8 losses |
|---|---|---|
| By knockout | 0 | 4 |
| By decision | 4 | 4 |
| Draws | 1 | |

| No. | Result | Record | Opponent | Type | Round, time | Date | Location | Notes |
|---|---|---|---|---|---|---|---|---|
| 13 | Loss | 4–8–1 | (Germany) Elina Tissen | TKO | 3 (10), 1:43 | 26 Mar 2011 | (Germany) Stadtwerke Arena Münster, Münster | For GBC female featherweight title GBU female featherweight title For interim WIBF featherweight title |
| 12 | Loss | 4–7–1 | (Poland) Alicja Dabrowska | PTS | 6 | 23 Apr 2010 | (United Kingdom) Oasis Leisure Centre, Swindon | |
| 11 | Win | 4–6–1 | (Hungary) Zsofia Bedo | PTS | 6 | 16 Nov 2008 | (United Kingdom) Heritage Hotel, Derby | |
| 10 | Loss | 3–6–1 | (Germany) Magdalena Dahlen | UD | 6 | 19 Apr 2008 | (Germany) Bördelandhalle, Magdeburg | |
| 9 | Draw | 3–5–1 | (United Kingdom) Shanee Martin | PTS | 6 | 1 Dec 2007 | (United Kingdom) York Hall, Bethnal Green | |
| 8 | Loss | 3–5 | (Germany) Nadia Raoui | PTS | 10 | 17 Nov 2007 | (Germany) Sporthalle "Neue Zeit", Schwedt | |
| 7 | Win | 3–4 | (Ghana) Yarkor Chavez Annan | PTS | 4 | 12 May 2007 | (United Kingdom) Fenton Manor Sports Complex, Stoke-on-Trent | |
| 6 | Loss | 2–4 | (United Kingdom) Cathy Brown | PTS | 10 | 24 Sep 2006 | (United Kingdom) York Hall, Bethnal Green | |
| 5 | Win | 2–3 | (United Kingdom) Shanee Martin | PTS | 8 | 23 Jul 2006 | (United Kingdom) Goresbrook Leisure Centre, Dagenham | |
| 4 | Loss | 1–3 | (Netherlands) Esther Schouten | TKO | 4 (?) | 24 Jan 2004 | (Netherlands) Velodrome, Amsterdam | |
| 3 | Win | 1–2 | (United Kingdom) Cathy Brown | PTS | 4 | 20 Mar 2003 | (United Kingdom) Porchester Hall, Queensway | |
| 2 | Loss | 0–2 | (United Kingdom) Claire Cooper | RTD | 4 (4), 0:52 | 20 Sep 2001 | (United Kingdom) Mermaid Theatre, Blackfriars | |
| 1 | Loss | 0–1 | (United Kingdom) Sara Hall | RTD | 4 (6), 2:00 | 16 Jun 2001 | (United Kingdom) Pennine Hotel, Derby | Professional debut |
