= Go Shindo =

Japanese boxer (born 1987)

Personal information
- Nationality: Japanese
- Born: Megumi Hashimoto (橋本めぐみ); 18 July 1987 (age 39) Maniwa, Japan
- Height: 5 ft 6 in (168 cm)
- Weight: Flyweight; Bantamweight

Boxing career
- Stance: Orthodox

Boxing record
- Total fights: 20
- Wins: 16
- Win by KO: 11
- Losses: 4

Go Hashimoto (橋本 浩, Hashimoto Gō) (formerly Megumi Hashimoto (橋本 めぐみ, Hashimoto Megumi); born 18 July 1987), also professionally known as Go Shindo (真道 ゴー, Shindō Gō), is a Japanese former professional boxer who held the WBC female flyweight title from 2013 to 2014. At regional level, he held the OPBF female flyweight title in 2011. in 2017, Go came out as transgender and has since retired from women's boxing.

== Career ==
On 25 May 2008, Go made his professional debut at the local Wakayama Prefectural Gymnasium in the match against former amateur Japanese champion Masae Akitaya which he lost by a unanimous decision. In 2012, he lost against Mariana Juárez for the WBC female flyweight title. Later in 2013, he won the WBC female flyweight title defeating then world champion Renáta Szebelédi via a 10 round unanimous decision at the Big Wave, Wakayama, Japan.

=== Retirement ===
On 17 July 2017, Shindo announced that he underwent male assignment surgery and changed his legal name to Go Hashimoto. In the same announcement, he announced that he had married Ayuka, a non-celebrity cis-gender woman, and plans to submit a retirement notice.

On October 30, 2017, he announced his retirement from active boxing with a record of 16 wins (11KO) and 4 losses. He also indicated his intention to convert to a male professional boxer in the future.
