= Anna Laurell Nash =

Swedish boxer (born 1980)

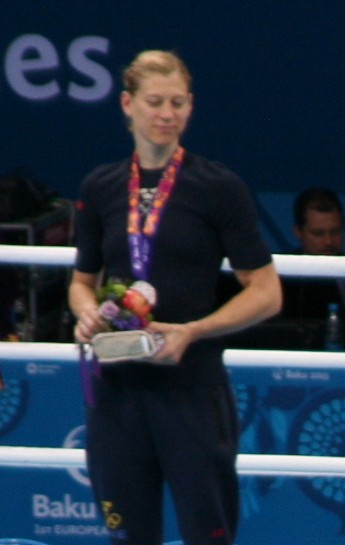
- Anna Laurell at the awarding ceremony of the 2015 European Games

Personal information
- Full name: Anna Rosalie Eleonora Laurell Nash
- Nationality: Sweden
- Born: 12 February 1980 (age 46) Klågerup
- Height: 1.84 m (6 ft 1/2 in)
- Website: www.annalaurell.com

Sport
- Country: Sweden
- Sport: Boxing
- Club: IF Linnéa
- Coached by: John Brickell
Medal record
Women's boxing
Representing Sweden
World Amateur Boxing Championships
Gold medal – first place	2001 Scranton	75kg
Gold medal – first place	2005 Podolsk	75kg
Silver medal – second place	2008 Ningbo	75kg
Bronze medal – third place	2012 Qinhuangdao	75kg
European Games
Silver medal – second place	2015 Baku	75kg
European Championships
Gold medal – first place	2004 Riccione	75kg
Gold medal – first place	2005 Tønsberg	75kg
Gold medal – first place	2007 Vejle	75kg
Silver medal – second place	2001 Saint-Amand-les-Eaux	75kg
Bronze medal – third place	2003 Pécs	75kg

Anna Rosalie Eleonora Laurell Nash (born 12 February 1980) is a Swedish boxer. Laurell has won two World Championship golds, three European Championship golds and seven national Swedish championship golds in boxing. Laurell competed in the 2012 Summer Olympics in London after receiving a wild card from the Swedish Olympic Committee. She made it to the quarter-finals in her weight class.

In 2014, she participated in the SVT show Mästarnas mästare on SVT.
