= Hagar Finer =

Israeli boxer (born 1984)

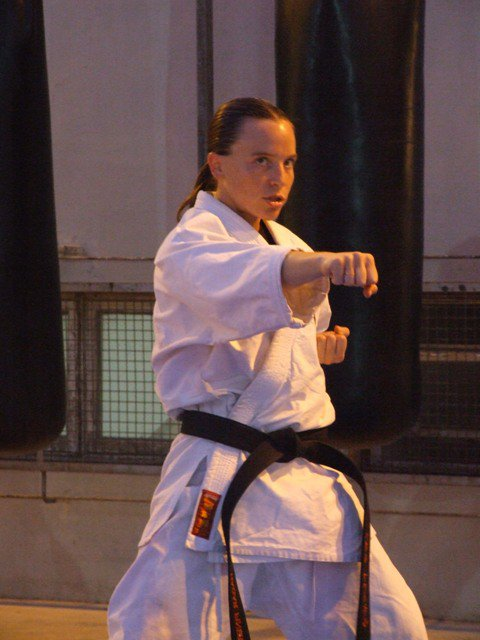
- Hagar Finer teaching her martial arts class

Personal information
- Nationality: Israeli
- Born: Hagar Shmoulefeld Finer; June 14, 1984 (age 42) Jerusalem, Israel
- Weight: Bantamweight

Boxing career

Boxing record
- Total fights: 35
- Wins: 24
- Win by KO: 7
- Losses: 7
- Draws: 3

Hagar Finer (Hebrew: הגר פיינר; born 1984) is an Israeli boxer. She is the WIBF bantamweight champion 2009.

== Biography ==
Hagar Finer was born in Tel Aviv, Israel, on October 15, 1984. She took up martial arts at the age of 13 and became the Israeli karate champion for her age group. At 17, she switched to boxing at the urging of her coach, Raanan Tal. Between 2009 and 2012, she was managed by Hezi Shayb. In 2012, she started training with a new coach named Lior David.

== Boxing career ==
Finer first won the WIBF bantamweight title in a match against Ukrainian boxer Oksana Romanova which was held in Germany on October 10, 2009. Finer won by a technical knockout in the sixth round.

This match was preceded by several attempts to win the world championship title in different weight categories, one of which being veteran German boxer Regina Halmich's farewell fight on November 30, 2007.

On April 29, 2010, Finer retained her title after defeating the Armenian boxer Agnesse Boza, whom she knocked out a minute before the end of the fifth round. The match took place in the Nokia Arena in Tel Aviv.

On October 30, 2010, Finer defended her title again against German boxer Julia Sahin in a match that was held in Ontario, Canada. The match was ten rounds long and was won by umpire decision.

On January 22, 2011, Finer defeated French boxer Nadege Szikora in a match that was held in France, thus retaining her title for the third time.

On July 14, 2012, Finer defended her title for the fourth time, this time in Munich, Germany. She defeated Austrian boxer Bettina Granasi by a knockout in the third round.

== Professional boxing record ==
35 fights	24 wins	7 losses
By knockout	7	0
By decision	17	7
Draws	3	
No contests	1	

No.	Result	Record	Opponent	Type	Round, time	Date	Location	Notes
35	Win		Bettina Granasi	TKO		2012-07-14	Impact Gym, Munich	Women's International Boxing Federation World Bantamweight Title
34	Win		Nadege Szikora	UD		2011-01-22	Palais des sports Marcel Cerdan, Levallois-Perret	Women's International Boxing Federation World Bantamweight Title
33	Win		Hülya Şahin	UD		2010-10-30	Casino Rama, Rama	Women's International Boxing Federation World Bantamweight Title
32	Win		Agnese Boza	KO		2010-04-29	Nokia Hall, Tel Aviv	Women's International Boxing Federation World Bantamweight Title
31	Win		Dendi Fleis	UD		2010-01-18	Hangar 11, Tel Aviv	
30	Win		Oksana Romanova*	TKO		2009-10-10	Darmstadtium, Darmstadt	vacant Women's International Boxing Federation World Bantamweight Title
29	Win		Svetla Taskova	PTS		2009-08-08	Aviv Sport Hall, Ra'anana	
28	Loss		Susi Kentikian	UD		2008-08-29	Burg-Waechter Castello, Düsseldorf	WBA World Female Flyweight Title Women's International Boxing Federation World Flyweight Title
27	Win		Dendi Fleis	PTS		2008-07-20	Bulldog Open Air Arena, Karlsruhe	
26	Loss		Alesia Graf	UD		2008-03-08	KoenigPALAST, Krefeld	Global Boxing Union Female World Super Flyweight Title Women's International Boxing Federation World Super Flyweight Title
25	Win		Doris Köhler	TKO		2008-03-01	Aviv Sport Hall, Ra'anana	
24	Win		Doris Köhler	PTS		2008-02-09	Rheinstetten	L
23	Loss		Regina Halmich	MD		2007-11-30	DM-Arena, Karlsruhe	Women's International Boxing Federation World Flyweight Title
22	Win		Bettina Voelker	TKO		2007-10-27	Aviv Sport Hall, Ra'anana	Women's International Boxing Federation World Super Flyweight Title
21	Win		Natascha Guthier	UD		2007-04-28	Aviv Sport Hall, Ra'anana	
20	Win		Svetla Taskova	PTS		2007-01-06	Sofia	
19	Win		Judith Palecian	TKO		2006-11-25	Aviv Sport Hall, Ra'anana	
18	Win		Albena Atseva	PTS		2006-11-11	Keltenhalle, Rheinstetten	
17	Win		Emilina Metodieva	UD		2006-06-30	Aviv Sport Hall, Ra'anana	
16	Loss		Stefania Bianchini	TD		2006-05-12	Rezzato	WBC World Female Flyweight Title
15	Win		Svetla Taskova	UD		2006-03-25	Aviv Sport Hall, Ra'anana	
14	Loss		Hülya Şahin	MD		2006-01-24	Universum Gym, Wandsbek, Germany	
13	Win		Gabriella Rozsa	UD		2005-11-12	Aviv Sport Hall, Ra'anana	
12	Loss		Reka Krempf			2005-06-24	Sporthall Lang, Budapest	vacant Women's International Boxing Federation World Super Flyweight Title
11	Win		Eira Ragimova	UD		2005-06-04	Aviv Sport Hall, Ra'anana	
10	Win		Yelena Shelkovina	PTS		2005-02-19	Aviv Sport Hall, Ra'anana	
9	Win		Yelena Shelkovina	PTS		2004-11-06	Aviv Sport Hall, Ra'anana	
8	Win		Lital Liron	TKO		2004-10-15	C.M.A. Gym, Tel Aviv	
7	Win		Anat Idan	PTS		2004-05-29	Aviv Sport Hall, Ra'anana	
6	ND		Anita Christensen	ND		2003-12-13	Falconer Centeret, Frederiksberg	
5	Loss		Judith Palecian	UD		2003-08-30	City Sporthall, Ozd, Hungary	Global Boxing Union Female World Super Flyweight Title Women's International Boxing Federation World Super Flyweight Title
4	Win		Goranka Blagojevich		Tel Aviv	2003-07-26		
3	Draw		Reka Krempf	PTS		2002-11-27	Tel Aviv	
2	Draw		Viktoria Varga	PTS		2002-11-09	Tel Aviv	
1	Draw		Lital Liron	PTS		2002-03-24	Tel Aviv	

== See also ==
- Sport in Israel
- List of select Jewish boxers
