= Renáta Szebelédi =

Hungarian boxer (born 1993)

Personal information
- Nickname: Barbie Girl
- Nationality: Hungarian
- Born: 2 August 1993 (age 32) Budapest, Hungary
- Height: 162 cm (5 ft 4 in)
- Weight: Flyweight; Super-flyweight; Bantamweight; Super-bantamweight; Featherweight

Boxing career
- Stance: Southpaw

Boxing record
- Total fights: 26
- Wins: 16
- Win by KO: 10
- Losses: 10

Renáta Barbara Szebelédi (born 2 August 1993) is a former Hungarian professional boxer who competed held from 2008 to 2013. She held WBC female flyweight title from 2012 to 2013 and challenged for the IBF female junior-bantamweight title in 2012.

== Professional boxing record ==
26 fights	16 wins	10 losses
By knockout	10	0
By decision	6	10

No.	Result	Record	Opponent	Type	Round, time	Date	Location	Notes
26	Loss	16–10	(Japan) Shindo Go	UD	10	19 May 2013	Big Wave, Wakayama, Japan	Lost WBC female flyweight title
25	Win	16–9	(Italy) Simona Galassi	TKO	3 (10), 1:49	27 Oct 2012	Palasport, Arcella, Italy	Won vacant WBC female flyweight title
24	Win	15–9	(Romania) Eva Marcu	TKO	8 (10), 0:35	12 May 2012	Sashalom Event Hall, Budapest, Hungary	Retained WBF female bantamweight title
23	Loss	14–9	(Italy) Simona Galassi	UD	10	14 Apr 2012	Palasport, Vicenza, Italy	For IBF female junior-bantamweight title
22	Win	14–8	(Hungary) Gabriella Vicze	TKO	2 (10), 1:17	19 Aug 2011	Ferry Port, Štúrovo, Slovakia	
21	Win	13–8	(Romania) Gabriella Insperger	TKO	1 (4)	13 Aug 2011	Airport, Budaörs, Hungary	
20	Win	12–8	(Germany) Pia Mazelanik	UD	10	2 Jul 2011	Regenstorplatz, Lemgo, Germany	Won inaugural WBF female bantamweight title
19	Win	11–8	(Romania) Eva Marcu	TKO	6 (10), 0:01	4 Jun 2011	Győr Plaza, Győr, Hungary	Won inaugural Hungarian female bantamweight title
18	Win	10–8	(Hungary) Marianna Gulyás	PTS	4	7 Apr 2011	Gilda-Max Fitness, Budapest, Hungary	
17	Win	9–8	(Hungary) Melinda Zsiga	PTS	4	27 Mar 2011	Ujlak School Gymnasium, Budapest, Hungary	
16	Win	8–8	(Hungary) Renáta Dömsödi	UD	4	27 Feb 2011	City Sport Hall, Gyömrő, Hungary	
15	Win	7–8	(Romania) Gabriella Insperger	TKO	4 (10), 0:36	14 Dec 2010	Gilda-Max Fitness, Budapest, Hungary	Won inaugural UBO female super bantamweight title
14	Loss	6–8	(Russia) Oksana Vasilieva	UD	10	27 Nov 2010	Express CSC, Rostov-on-Don, Russia	For inaugural WBF female featherweight title
13	Loss	6–7	(South Africa) Unathi Myekeni	UD	10	12 Sep 2010	Mdantsane Indoor Centre, Mdantsane, South Africa	For inaugural WBF female super-bantamweight title
12	Win	6–6	(Hungary) Gabriella Vicze	TKO	1 (4), 0:36	9 Jun 2010	Lőrinc Billiard Saloon, Budapest, Hungary	
11	Win	5–6	(Slovakia) Maria Cikova	TKO	2 (4)	30 May 2010	Štúrovo Gym, Štúrovo, Slovakia	
10	Win	4–6	(Hungary) Marianna Gulyás	PTS	4	15 May 2010	Diadal st. Elementary School, Budapest, Hungary	
9	Win	3–6	(Slovakia) Maria Cikova	TKO	5 (6)	6 Mar 2010	ZŠ Bukovecká, Košice, Slovakia	
8	Loss	2–6	(France) Nadya Hokmi	PTS	6	23 Jan 2010	Dragon Hall, Saverne, France	
7	Win	2–5	(Hungary) Marianna Gulyás	TKO	2 (4), 1:57	8 Jan 2010	Riverfront Culture Center, Nové Zámky, Slovakia	
6	Win	1–5	(Hungary) Gabriella Vicze	PTS	4	28 Dec 2009	L.P. Gym, Nové Zámky, Slovakia	
5	Loss	0–5	(Italy) Perla Bragagnolo	PTS	6	13 Nov 2009	Rivara, Italy	
4	Loss	0–4	(Belgium) Delfine Persoon	UD	6	4 Oct 2009	Olympia Stadion, Marke, Belgium	
3	Loss	0–3	(Italy) Valeria Imbrogno	PTS	6	28 Jun 2009	Eden Village, Sabaudia, Italy	
2	Loss	0–2	(Italy) Valeria Imbrogno	PTS	6	22 May 2009	Palazzetto dello Sport, Rezzato, Italy	
1	Loss	0–1	(Romania) Corina Carlescu	UD	4	1 Aug 2008	Sport Hall, Piatra Neamț, Romania	

Sporting positions
Minor world boxing titles
Inaugural champion	UBO female super-bantamweight champion 14 December 2010 – 2011	Vacant Title next held by Lila dos Santos Furtado
Inaugural champion	WBF female bantamweight champion 2 July 2011 – 2013; Vacated	Vacant Title next held by Nadya Hokmi
Major world boxing titles
Vacant Title last held by Mariana Juárez	WBC female flyweight champion 27 October 2012 – 19 May 2013	Succeeded by Shindo Go
