= Hülya Şahin =

German boxer (born 1974)

Personal information
- Nickname: Julia “Sunshine” Sahin
- Nationality: (Germany) German (Turkey) Turkish
- Born: Hülya Şahin; February 23, 1974 (age 52) Siegen, West Germany
- Weight: junior flyweight

Boxing career

Boxing record
- Total fights: 23
- Wins: 20
- Win by KO: 2
- Losses: 3
- Draws: 0
- No contests: 0

Hülya Şahin
Medal record

Women's amateur boxing

World Championships
Gold medal – first place	2001 Scranton, USA	48 kg

European Championships
Gold medal – first place	2003 Pécs, Hungary	48 kg
Gold medal – first place	2001 Saint-Amand-les-Eaux, France	48 kg

Tournaments
Gold medal – first place	2003 Ahmet Cömert, Turkey	48 kg
Silver medal – second place	2003 Bocskai, Debrecen, Hungary	48 kg
Gold medal – first place	2002 Ahmet Cömert, Turkey	48 kg
Gold medal – first place	2001 Feenix Cup Turku, Finland	48 kg
Gold medal – first place	2000 European Cup Mâcon, France	48 kg
Gold medal – first place	1999 European Cup Köping, Sweden	48 kg
Gold medal – first place	1998 Witch Cup Pécs, Hungary	51 kg

Women's amateur kickboxing

World Championships
Bronze medal – third place	1999 W.A.K.O Caorle, Italy	52 kg
Gold medal – first place	1998	n/a
Gold medal – first place	1995 W.A.K.O Kyiv, Ukraine	52 kg

European Championships
Bronze medal – third place	1996 W.A.K.O Belgrade, Serbia & Montenegro	52 kg

Hülya Şahin, a.k.a. Julia "Sunshine" Sahin, (born February 23, 1974, in Siegen, West Germany) is a German professional female boxer. She is a former world champion in kickboxing and was world champion in amateur boxing as well. As of September 1, 2007, she is the undefeated WIBF world junior flyweight (48 kg) champion. The 1.60 m (5 ft 3 in) tall sportswoman lives in Cologne, Germany. Hülya is an educated locksmith, working currently for the Cologne Transit Company (KVB) in the maintenance of ticket machines in trams.

At her age of 19, she began kickboxing inspired by her brother, who is a kickboxer. Hülya became quickly world champion as an amateur and later once again world champion, this time as a professional. However, she had to quit kickboxing due to a serious injury at her leg.

Her mother raised heavy objections soon after she started to perform boxing, and she tried hard to convince her parents. They accepted her choice as she began to gain success again by earning titles like four times the Turkish champion, twice the European champion and finally the world champion

Since 2004, she is boxing professionally and is the only female member of the boxing sports club Universum Box-Promotion in Hamburg. She is coached by Michael Timm.

== Kickboxing ==
In 1995, only two years after she began performing kickboxing, Hülya became world champion in flyweight (52 kg) division at the full contact karate championships held in Kyiv, Ukraine. She earned the professional world champion title in the same division 1998 in Leverkusen, Germany.

== Amateur boxing ==
From 1998 to 2003, Hülya fought as an amateur boxer for Turkey, quickly becoming one of the most successful members of the national team.

- She won the gold medal in the 51 kg division of the 1st International Witch Boxing Cup tournament held in Pécs, Hungary in 1998.
- On June 12, 1999, in the final of the 1st European Women's Cup held in Köping, Sweden, Hülya defeated Elefteria Palaiologou from Greece by a 13–3 score to win the 48 kg division.
- On April 9, 2000, in the final of the 2nd European Cup for Women at the Palais des Sports in Mâcon, France, she defeated Aroussia Hadjam of France.
- On April 14, 2001, in the 1st European Championships held in Saint-Amand-les-Eaux, France, she defeated French Vanessa Berteaux to win the gold medal in the 48 kg division.
- At the 1st World Women's Boxing Championship held between October 21 and 27, 2001 in Scranton, Pennsylvania, United States, Hülya Şahin won a gold medal in the 48 kg division with an 8-6 decision over Monika Czik of Hungary in the preliminary round, followed by an 11-4 decision over Carina Moreno of Watsonville, California, USA in the semi-final and a 13-5 decision over M. C. Mary Kom of India in the final.
- In the 48 kg division of the 2nd European Championship for Women held in Pecs, Hungary, she defeated Laura Tosti of Italy by a 23–7 score in the semi-final on May 15, 2003, and Monika Csik of Hungary by a 13-6 margin in the final on May 16, 2003.
- Hülya won the silver medal in the 48 kg division at the 47th Bocskei Cup held between January 29 through February 1, 2003 in Debrecen, Hungary after losing to Monika Csik of Hungary

== Pro boxing career ==
- On January 17, 2004, at Dm-Arena in Karlsruhe, Germany, Hülya Şahin made her debut as a professional boxer at her age of 29, and won a four-round unanimous decision (0-4-0) over Gabriella Insperger of Salonta, Romania.
- On March 20, 2004, at Saaltheater Geulen in Aachen, Germany, she won a four-round unanimous decision over Stella Evropiedieva .
- On May 29, 2004, at Ostseehalle in Kiel, Germany, Hülya Şahin TKO'd Romanian Anca Pop in the fourth round of a scheduled six-rounder.
- On July 3, 2004, in Stadthalle in Hattersheim, Germany, she won a four-round decision over Oksana Romanova from Minsk, Belarus.
- On July 17, 2004, at Stadthalle in Zwickau, Germany, she won a six-round unanimous decision over Pavla Stankeova of Opava, Czech Republic.
- On September 18, 2004, at Wilhelm-Dopatka-Halle in Leverkusen, Küppersteg, Germany. Hülya won a six-round decision over Iliana Boneva of Bulgaria.
- On October 16, 2004, at the Maritim Hotel in Cologne, Germany, she won an eight-round unanimous decision over Svetla Taskova of Sofia, Bulgaria.
- On January 15, 2005, at Bördelandhalle in Magdeburg, Germany, Hülya won a ten-round unanimous decision over Maja Frenzel of Karlsruhe, Germany for the German Flyweight Title.
- On March 5, 2005, at Wilhelm-Dopatka-Halle, Leverkusen, Küppersteg, Germany Hülya TKO'd Viktoria Varga of Budapest, Hungary at 0:56 in the fifth round.
- On May 28, 2005, at the Hanns-Martin-Schleyer-Halle in Stuttgart, Germany she won an eight-round unanimous decision over Marianne Chubirka of Vero Beach, Florida, United States.
- On July 2, 2005, in Hamburg, Germany, Hülya defeated Oksana Romanova of Minsk, Belarus with an eight-round unanimous decision.
- On October 15, 2005, at the Mehrzweckhalle, Düsseldorf, Germany, she won a ten-round unanimous decision over Daniela Graff of Karlsruhe, Germany defending her German Flyweight title.
- On December 3, 2005, at the Bördelandhalle in Magdeburg, Germany, Hülya Sahin won a ten-round unanimous decision over Stephanie Dobbs of Moore, Oklahoma, USA for the vacant WIBF Inter-Continental Flyweight title.
- On January 24, 2006, at the Universum Gym in Hamburg, Germany, Hulya won a ten-round majority decision over Hagar Finer of Tel-Aviv, Israel defending her WIBF Inter-Continental Flyweight title.
- On April 8, 2006, at the Ostseehalle in Kiel, Germany, she won by a ten-round unanimous decision over Cathy Brown of Peckham, United Kingdom for the WIBF Interim Junior Flyweight title.
- On September 9, 2006, at Bördelandhalle, Magdeburg, Germany, Hülya retained her WIBF Interim Junior Flyweight Title against Marylin Hernandez of Santo Domingo, Dominican Republic by a ten-round unanimous decision.
- On January 27, 2007, at Burgwächter Castello in Düsseldorf, Germany, she won a ten-round unanimous decision over Anastasia Toktaulova of Moscow, Russia for the WIBF Interim Junior Flyweight title. Hülya was knocked to the canvas by a right hand in the eighth round, however could come back to secure the decision.
- On June 30, 2007, at Porsche Arena in Stuttgart, Germany, Hülya Şahin defended her WIBF Junior Flyweight title with a split decision in a very close ten-rounder with Hollie Dunaway of the US. The three judges split their scoring, with Şahin winning on two cards and Dunaway on the other.
- On July 28, 2007, at Burg-Wächter-Castello in Düsseldorf, Germany, she won a ten-round unanimous decision over Delia Lopez of Tlaxcala, Mexico retaining her WIBF Junior Flyweight title.

Şahin has a record of 20 wins with 3 losses, with 2 wins by knockout, and ranks world top boxer of junior flyweight division considered 133 woman boxers.

== Professional boxing record ==
23 fights	20 wins	3 losses
By knockout	2	0
By decision	18	3

No.	Result	Record	Opponent	Type	Round, time	Date	Location	Notes
23	Loss	20-3	(France) Nadya Hokmi	UD	10, 2:00	Jun 18, 2011	Stade Joffre Lefebvre, Lingolsheim, France	WIBF World Super flyweight title
22	Loss	20-2	(Israel) Hagar Shmoulefeld Finer	UD	10, 2:00	Oct 30, 2010	Casino Rama, Rama, Canada	WIBF World Bantamweight title
21	Loss	20-1	(Germany) Susi Kentikian	UD	10, 2:00	Oct 10, 2009	Stadthalle, Rostock, Germany	WBA & WBO World Female Flyweight titles & WIBF World Light Flyweight title
20	Win	20-0	(United States) Yahaira Martinez	UD	10, 2:00	Apr 5, 2008	Burg-Waechter Castello, Düsseldorf, Germany	WIBF World Light Flyweight title
19	Win	19-0	(Mexico) Delia Lopez	UD	10, 2:00	Jul 28, 2007	Burg-Waechter Castello, Düsseldorf, Germany	WIBF World Light Flyweight title
18	Win	18-0	(United States) Hollie Dunaway	SD	10, 2:00	Jun 30, 2007	Porsche Arena, Stuttgart, Germany	WIBF World Light Flyweight title
17	Win	17-0	(Russia) Anastasia Toktaulova	UD	10, 2:00	Jan 27, 2007	Burg-Waechter Castello, Düsseldorf, Germany	WIBF World Light Flyweight title
16	Win	16-0	(Dominican Republic) Marilyn Hernandez	UD	10, 2:00	Sep 9, 2006	Bordelandhalle, Magdeburg, Germany	Interim WIBF World Light Flyweight title
15	Win	15-0	(United Kingdom) Cathy Brown	UD	10, 2:00	Apr 8, 2006	Ostseehalle, Kiel, Germany	Interim WIBF World Light Flyweight title
14	}Win	14-0	(Israel) Hagar Shmoulefeld Finer	MD	10, 2:00	Jan 24, 2006	Universum Gym, Wandsbek, Germany	WIBF Intercontinental female flyweight title
13	Win	13-0	(United States) Stephanie Dobbs	UD	10, 2:00	Dec 3, 2005	Bordelandhalle, Magdeburg, Germany	WIBF Intercontinental female flyweight title
12	Win	12-0	(Germany) Daniela Graf	UD	10, 2:00	Oct 15, 2005	Mehrzweckhalle Sued, Düsseldorf, Germany	German female flyweight title
11	Win	11-0	(Ukraine) Oksana Romanova	UD	8, 2:00	Jul 2, 2005	Color Line Arena, Altona, Germany	
10	Win	10-0	(United States) Marianna Chubirka	UD	8, 2:00	May 28, 2005	Hanns-Martin-Schleyer-Halle, Stuttgart, Germany	
9	Win	9-0	(Hungary) Viktoria Varga	TKO	5, 0:56	Mar 5, 2005	Wilhelm-Dopatka-Halle, Leverkusen, Germany	
8	Win	8-0	(Germany) Maja Frenzel	UD	10, 2:00	Jan 15, 2005	Bordelandhalle, Magdeburg, Germany	German female flyweight title
7	Win	7-0	(Bulgaria) Svetla Taskova	UD	8, 2:00	Oct 16, 2004	Maritim Hotel, Cologne, Germany	
6	Win	6-0	(Bulgaria) Iliana Boneva	PTS	6, 2:00	Sep 18, 2004	Wilhelm-Dopatka-Halle, Leverkusen, Germany	
5	Win	5-0	(Czech Republic) Pavla Stankeova	UD	6, 2:00	Jul 17, 2004	Stadthalle, Zwickau, Germany	
4	Win	4-0	(Ukraine) Oksana Romanova	PTS	4, 2:00	Jul 3, 2004	Stadthalle, Hattersheim am Main, Germany	
3	Win	3-0	(Romania) Anca Pop	TKO	4, 1:26	May 29, 2004	Ostseehalle, Kiel, Germany	
2	Win	2-0	(Germany) Stella Evropiedieva	UD	4, 2:00	Mar 30, 2004	Saaltheater Geulen, Aachen, Germany	
1	Win	1-0	(Romania) Gabriella Insperger	UD	4, 2:00	Jan 17, 2004	DM-Arena, Karlsruhe, Germany	

Sporting positions
Preceded by ?	World Women's Amateur Kickboxing Champion; January 15, 1998 - ?	Succeeded by ?
Preceded by inexistent	World Women's Amateur Boxing Junior Flyweight Champion; October 27, 2001 - October 27, 2002	Succeeded by (North Korea) Ri Jong Hyang
Preceded by (Germany) Maja Frenzel	German Flyweight Champion; January 15, 2005 - present	Succeeded by incumbent
Preceded by vacant	WIBF Inter-Continental Flyweight Champion; December 3, 2005 - present	Succeeded by incumbent
Preceded by (United Kingdom) Cathy Brown	WIBF Junior Flyweight Champion; April 8, 2006 - present	Succeeded by incumbent
