= Yasemin Ustalar =

Turkish boxer

Personal information
- Born: 1975 (age 50–51) Şereflikoçhisar, Turkey
Medal record
Women's Boxing
Representing Turkey
World Championships
Silver medal – second place	2002 Antalya, Turkey	63.5 kg

Yasemin Ustalar (later Yasemin Çabuk) is a Turkish female boxer. She was born in Şereflikoçhisar (1975). She won a silver medal in the 63.5 kg category at the 2002 Women's World Amateur Boxing Championships held in Antalya, Turkey.
