= 2002 Women's World Amateur Boxing Championships =

Boxing competitions

- Location: Antalya, Turkey
- Dates: October 21-27, 2002

The 2002 Women's World Amateur Boxing Championships was an international women's boxing competition hosted by Turkey from October 21 to 27 2002 in Antalya. It was the 2nd championship, which debuted 2001 in Scranton, Pennsylvania, United States.

== Results ==
Bronze medals are awarded to both losing semi-finalists.

2002 World Women's Boxing Championship
Weight	Gold	Silver	Bronze	
45 kg	(India) Mary Kom	(North Korea) Jang Song-ae	(Turkey) Derya Aktop	(Ukraine) Svetlana Miroshnichenko
48 kg	(North Korea) Ri Jong-hyang	(Ukraine) Tatyana Lebedeva	(Hungary) Mónika Csík	(India) Kumari Meena
51 kg	(Italy) Simona Galassi	(North Korea) Kim Kum-son	(Russia) Lidiya Andreyeva	(Greece) Elefheria Paleologou
54 kg	(China) Zhang Xiyan	(Italy) Marzia Davide	(North Korea) Ha Son-bi	(Hungary) Ágnes Tápai
57 kg	(North Korea) Jo Pok-sun	(Norway) Henriette Kitel-Birkeland	(Russia) Svetlana Kulakova	(Greece) Maria Semertzoglu
60 kg	(Canada) Jennifer Smith-Ogg	(Greece) Areti Mastroduka	(Brazil) Ana Santos	(United States) Naquana Smalls
63.5 kg	(France) Myriam Lamare	(Turkey) Yasemin Ustalar	(Romania) Daniela David	(Ukraine) Saida Gasanova
67 kg	(Russia) Irina Sinetskaya	(United States) Natalie Brown	(Denmark) Tina Hansen	(Australia) Desi Kontos
71 kg	(Ukraine) Larisa Berezenko	(United States) Yvonne Reis	(Argentina) Paola Gabriela Casalinuovo	(Canada) Roxanne Lalancette
75 kg	(Belarus) Olga Slavinskaya	(Denmark) Betina Karlsen	(China) Guo Shuai	(India) Karamjit Kaur
81 kg	(Ukraine) Anzhela Torskaya	(Belarus) Irina Smirnova	(Canada) Jennyfer Grenon	(Russia) Olga Novoselova
90 kg	(Hungary) Mária Kovács	(Russia) Mariya Yovorskaya	(United States) Devonne Canady	(India) Jyotsana Haryana

== Medal count table ==
2002 World Women's Boxing Championship
Pos	Country	Gold	Silver	Bronze	Total
1	North Korea	2	2	1	5
2	Ukraine	2	1	2	5
3	Russia	1	1	3	5
4	Belarus	1	1		2
4=	Italy	1	1		2
6	India	1		3	4
7	Canada	1		2	3
7=	Hungary	1		2	3
9	China	1		1	2
10	France	1			1
11	United States		2	2	4
12	Greece		1	2	3
13	Denmark		1	1	2
13=	Turkey		1	1	2
15	Norway		1		1
16	Argentina			1	1
16=	Australia			1	1
16=	Brazil			1	1
16=	Romania			1	1
	Total	12	12	24	48
