= 2004 Women's European Amateur Boxing Championships =

Boxing competitions

2004 Women's European Boxing Championships
- Host city: Riccione
- Country: Italy
- Dates: 3–10 October

The 3rd Women's European Amateur Boxing Championships were held in Riccione, Italy from October 3 to 10, 2004. This edition of the recurring competition was organised by the European governing body for amateur boxing, EABA. Competitions took place in 13 weight classes.

Russia topped the medals table, as they had done in the two previous editions of these championships.

== Medal table ==
* Host nation (Italy)

Rank	Nation	Gold	Silver	Bronze	Total
1	Russia	3	2	5	10
2	Ukraine	2	1	2	5
3	Romania	2	0	4	6
4	Italy*	2	0	3	5
5	Turkey	1	3	5	9
6	Hungary	1	2	1	4
7	Sweden	1	1	0	2
8	Denmark	1	0	0	1
9	Norway	0	2	0	2
10	France	0	1	1	2
11	Finland	0	1	0	1
12	Poland	0	0	3	3
13	Germany	0	0	1	1
13	Greece	0	0	1	1
Totals (14 entries)		13	13	26	52

== Medal winners ==
Event	Gold	Silver	Bronze
Pinweight (46kg)	(Russia) Elena Sabitova	(Turkey) Derya Aktop	(Italy) Carmela Chiacchio (Romania) Camelia Negrea
Light flyweight (48kg)	(Ukraine) Tatiana Lebiediewa	(Hungary) Monika Csik	(Italy) Laura Tosti (Turkey) Beyhan Karacibioğlu
Flyweight (50kg)	(Italy) Simona Galassi	(Russia) Viktoria Usatchenko	(Turkey) Hasibe Özer (Romania) Diana Ungureanu
Super flyweight (52kg)	(Romania) Floarea Lihet	(Turkey) Sümeyra Kaya	(Italy) Loredana Piazza (France) Audrey Garcia
Bantamweight (54kg)	(Romania) Mihalea Cijevschi	(Norway) Kari Jensen	(Ukraine) Ludmiła Hrycaj (Russia) Jewgienia Grebienszczikowa
Featherweight (57kg)	(Italy) Marzia Davide	(France) Myriam Chomaz	(Hungary) Zsuzsanna Szuknai (Russia) Jelena Karpaczewa
Lightweight (60kg)	(Turkey) Gülsüm Tatar	(Finland) Eva Wahlström	(Poland) Anna Kasprzak (Russia) Yuliya Nemtsova
Super lightweight (63kg)	(Denmark) Vinni Skovgaard	(Norway) Cecilia Brækhus	(Ukraine) Anastasja Sawinowa (Russia) Maria Karłowa
Welterweight (66kg)	(Russia) Irina Sinieckaja	(Sweden) Anna Ingman	(Turkey) Mehtap Bakış (Romania) Larisa Pop
Super welterweight (70kg)	(Russia) Olga Sławinskaja	(Turkey) Nurcan Çarkçı	(Poland) Karolina Łukasik (Germany) Rachel Richter
Middleweight (75kg)	(Sweden) Anna Laurell	(Hungary) Anita Ducza	(Turkey) Emine Özkan (Romania) Mihaela Marcut
Light heavyweight (80kg)	(Ukraine) Anżela Torska	(Russia) Galina Iwanowa	(Turkey) Selma Yağcı (Poland) Ewa Piwowarska
Heavyweight (86kg)	(Hungary) Mária Kovács	(Ukraine) Anna Żeljuk	(Russia) Maria Yavorskaya (Greece) Ekaterini Papakonstantinou
