= Simona Galassi =

Italian boxer (born 1972)

Personal information
- Nickname: Romagna Queen
- Nationality: Italian
- Born: 27 June 1972 (age 54) Forlì, Italy
- Height: 165 cm (5 ft 5 in)
- Weight: Flyweight; Super-flyweight
- Website: http://www.simonagalassi.it/

Boxing career
- Stance: Southpaw

Boxing record
- Total fights: 30
- Wins: 23
- Win by KO: 4
- Losses: 5
- Draws: 1
- No contests: 1
Medal record
World Amateur Championships
Gold medal – first place	2001 Scranton	Flyweight
Gold medal – first place	2002 Antalya	Flyweight
Gold medal – first place	2005 Podolsk	Flyweight
European Amateur Championships
Gold medal – first place	2003 Pécs	Flyweight
Gold medal – first place	2004 Riccione	Flyweight
Gold medal – first place	2005 Tønsberg	Flyweight

Simona Galassi (born 27 June 1972) is an Italian former boxer. As a professional, she competed from 2006 to 2015 and was a world champion in two weight classes, having held the WBC female flyweight title from 2008 to 2011 and the IBF female junior-bantamweight title from 2011 to 2012. At regional level she held the European female flyweight title twice between 2007 and 2015. As an amateur, she won gold medals at the 2001, 2002 and 2005 World Championships, and the 2003, 2004 and 2005 European Championships.

== Professional boxing record ==
30 fights	23 wins	5 losses
By knockout	4	1
By decision	19	4
Draws	1	
No contests	1	

No.	Result	Record	Opponent	Type	Round, time	Date	Location	Notes
30	Loss	23–5–1 (1)	(Mexico) Jessica Chávez	TD	9 (10) 0:45	12 Dec 2015	Auditorio BB, Mexico City, Mexico	For WBC female flyweight title
29	Loss	23–4–1 (1)	(Argentina) Débora Dionicius	SD	10	26 Jun 2015	Palasport, Manerba del Garda, Italy	For IBF female junior-bantamweight title
28	Win	23–3–1 (1)	(Italy) Loredana Piazza	UD	10	7 Feb 2015	Pala Hilton Pharma, Ferrara, Italy	Retained European female flyweight title
27	Win	22–3–1 (1)	(Russia) Evgeniya Zablotskaya	PTS	6	6 Dec 2014	Palazzo Congressi, Bellaria, Italy	
26	Win	21–3–1 (1)	(France) Laetitia Arzalier	UD	10	8 Aug 2014	Palafijlkam, Ostia, Italy	Retained European female flyweight title
25	Win	20–3–1 (1)	(Bulgaria) Galina Koleva Ivanova	TD	5 (10) 1:12	23 May 2014	Palasport, Molinella, Italy	Retained European female flyweight title
24	Loss	19–3–1 (1)	(Germany) Susi Kentikian	UD	10	7 Dec 2013	Porsche-Arena, Stuttgart, Germany	For WBA female flyweight title
23	Win	19–2–1 (1)	(Belgium) Sanae Jah	UD	10	15 Jun 2013	Campo Sportivo Comunale, Bertinoro, Italy	Won vacant European female flyweight title
22	Win	18–2–1 (1)	(Hungary) Gabriella Vicze	RTD	2 (6), 2:00	22 Feb 2013	Palasport, Montalto di Castro, Italy	
21	Loss	17–2–1 (1)	(Hungary) Renáta Szebelédi	TKO	3 (10), 1:49	27 Oct 2012	Palasport, Arcella, Italy	For vacant WBC female flyweight title
20	Win	17–1–1 (1)	(Hungary) Renáta Szebelédi	UD	10	14 Apr 2012	Palasport, Vicenza, Italy	Retained IBF female junior-bantamweight title
19	Win	16–1–1 (1)	(France) Nadege Szikora	UD	10	28 Oct 2011	PalaRockfeller, Cagliari, Italy	Won inaugural IBF female junior-bantamweight title
18	Win	15–1–1 (1)	(Bulgaria) Svetla Taskova	PTS	6	23 Jun 2011	Piazza Saffi, Forlì, Italy	
17	Loss	14–1–1 (1)	(Mexico) Mariana Juárez	UD	10	11 Mar 2011	Jose Cuervo Salon, Polanco, Mexico	Lost WBC female flyweight title
16	Win	14–0–1 (1)	(Serbia) Dendi Fleis	PTS	8	3 Sep 2010	Piazza Saffi, Forlì, Italy	
15	Win	13–0–1 (1)	(Mexico) Esmeralda Moreno	UD	10	12 Mar 2010	Palasport, Bertinoro, Italy	Retained WBC female flyweight title
14	Win	12–0–1 (1)	(France) Aziza Oubaita	UD	10	4 Dec 2009	Freizeit Arena, Sölden, Austria	Retained WBC female flyweight title
13	Win	11–0–1 (1)	(Hungary) Éva Ott	PTS	6	13 Jun 2009	Piazza Saffi, Forlì, Italy	
12	Win	10–0–1 (1)	(France) Isabelle Leonardi	PTS	6	25 Apr 2009	PalaVeneto, Ancona, Italy	
11	Win	9–0–1 (1)	(Italy) Stefania Bianchini	UD	10	24 Oct 2008	PalaLido, Milan, Italy	Retained WBC female flyweight title
10	Win	8–0–1 (1)	(United States) Eileen Olszewski	UD	10	18 Jul 2008	Civitanova Marche, Italy	Retained WBC female flyweight title
9	Win	7–0–1 (1)	(Italy) Stefania Bianchini	UD	10	29 Mar 2008	Palasport Villa Romiti, Forlì, Italy	Won WBC female flyweight title
8	Win	6–0–1 (1)	(Romania) Floarea Lihet	UD	10	28 Dec 2007	Palasport Villa Romiti, Forlì, Italy	Retained European female flyweight title
7	Win	5–0–1 (1)	(France) Isabelle Leonardi	PTS	8	16 Nov 2007	Palasport, Pisa, Italy	
6	NC	4–0–1 (1)	(Bulgaria) Svetla Taskova	ND	2 (6)	31 Jul 2007	Centro Polivalente, San Genesio ed Uniti, Italy	No contest after accidental headbutt in round two
5	Win	4–0–1	(Germany) Bettina Völker	TKO	10 (10), 1:18	11 May 2007	Palasport, Bertinoro, Italy	Won vacant European female flyweight title
4	Win	3–0–1	(Slovakia) Petra Jachmanová	TKO	5 (6)	30 Mar 2007	Millenium Gym, Como, Italy	
3	Draw	2–0–1	(France) Nadya Hokmi	SD	10	9 Jan 2007	Palazzetto dello Sport, Bergamo, Italy	For vacant European female flyweight title
2	Win	2–0	(Bulgaria) Svetla Taskova	PTS	8	14 Nov 2006	Palasport Villa Romiti, Forlì, Italy	
1	Win	1–0	(Slovakia) Simona Penčáková	TKO	2 (4)	8 Oct 2006	PalaLido, Milan, Italy	

Sporting positions
Regional boxing titles
Vacant Title last held by Stefania Bianchini	European female flyweight champion 11 May 2007 – 29 March 2008; Won world title	Vacant Title next held by Herself
Vacant Title last held by Herself	European female flyweight champion 15 June 2013 – 26 June 2015; Fought for world title	Vacant Title next held by Loredana Piazza
World boxing titles
Inaugural champion	IBF female junior-bantamweight champion 28 October 2011 – October 2012	Vacant Title next held by Débora Dionicius
Preceded by Stefania Bianchini	WBC female flyweight champion 29 March 2008 – 11 March 2011	Succeeded by Mariana Juárez
