= Hasibe Erkoç =

Turkish boxer

Personal information
- Weight: Flyweight

Boxing career
Medal record
Women's amateur boxing
Representing Turkey
World Championships
| Gold medal – first place | 2006 New Delhi | Flyweight |
European Championships
| Gold medal – first place | 2001 Saint-Amand-les-Eaux | Flyweight |
| Gold medal – first place | 2006 Warsaw | Flyweight |
| Silver medal – second place | 2003 Pécs | Flyweight |
| Silver medal – second place | 2005 Tønsberg | Flyweight |
| Bronze medal – third place | 2004 Riccione | Flyweight |

Hasibe Erkoç (née Özer) is a Turkish female boxer. She is a member of the TSE club in Ankara, Turkey.

== Career ==
She represented her country in the Flyweight (50 kg) category at the 4th World Women's Boxing Championship held between November 18 and 23, 2006 in New Delhi, India. She won a gold medal and Şemsi Yaralı won a bronze medal for Turkey. Hasibe Erkoç became world champion, defeating Li Siyuan from China in the final by 18-12.

Her parents Muhsin Özer and Emine live in Tokat, Turkey. As a young girl, Hasibe was interested in martial arts, and started with taekwondo, and then continued with kickboxing. However, in 1991, a foot injury forced her to switch to boxing.
