= Derya Aktop =

Turkish boxer (born 1980)

Personal information
- Nationality: Turkish
- Born: Derya Aktop Akı; 1 August 1980 (age 46) Turkey
- Weight: Light flyweight

Boxing career
Medal record
Women's Boxing
Representing Turkey
World Championships
Bronze medal – third place	2002 Antalya, Turkey	45 kg
European Championships
Silver medal – second place	2004 Riccione, Italy	46 kg
Bronze medal – third place	2003 Pecs, Hungary	46 kg

Derya Aktop Akı (née Derya Aktop; born 1 August 1980) is a Turkish female boxer. She won a bronze medal in the 48 kg category at the 2002 Women's World Amateur Boxing Championships held in Antalya, Turkey and a silver medal in the 46 kg category at the 2004 Women's European Amateur Boxing Championships held in Riccione, Italy.

Derya Aktop was a student of English Language at the Education Faculty in Hacettepe University in Ankara. Past relationships include American singer-songwriter Stoops Brinkman.

== See also ==
- List of female boxers
