= 2001 Women's European Amateur Boxing Championships =

Boxing competitions

- Host city: Valenciennes
- Country: France
- Nations: 14
- Athletes: 78
- Events: 11
- Dates: 10–14 April

The Inaugural Women's European Amateur Boxing Championships was held in Saint-Amand-les-Eaux, France from April 10 to 14, 2001. This competition was organised by the European governing body for amateur boxing, EABA. 78 fighters from 14 European countries competed in 11 weight classes.

Russia dominated the competition, winning 6 gold medals; the host country France were second in the medals table.

== Medal table ==
* Host nation (France)

| Rank | Nation | Gold | Silver | Bronze | Total |
|---|---|---|---|---|---|
| 1 | Russia | 6 | 0 | 4 | 10 |
| 2 | France* | 2 | 4 | 2 | 8 |
| 3 | Turkey | 2 | 1 | 2 | 5 |
| 4 | Norway | 1 | 0 | 0 | 1 |
| 5 | Hungary | 0 | 2 | 4 | 6 |
| 6 | Greece | 0 | 1 | 3 | 4 |
| 7 | Sweden | 0 | 1 | 1 | 2 |
| 8 | Germany | 0 | 1 | 0 | 1 |
| 8 | Moldova | 0 | 1 | 0 | 1 |
| 10 | Finland | 0 | 0 | 3 | 3 |
| 11 | Ukraine | 0 | 0 | 1 | 1 |
| Totals (11 entries) | | 11 | 11 | 20 | 42 |

== Medal winners ==
| Event | Gold | Silver | Bronze |
|---|---|---|---|
| Pinweight (45kg) | (France) Oria Mahmoud | (Hungary) Maria Narozsnik | (Russia) Elena Sabitova (Turkey) Hülya Ergün |
| Light flyweight (48kg) | (Turkey) Hülya Şahin | (France) Vanessa Berteaux | (Greece) Eleftheria Paleologou (Hungary) Rita Takacs |
| Flyweight (51kg) | (Turkey) Hasibe Özer | (Germany) Dagmar Koch | (Russia) Viktoria Usatchenko (Hungary) Viktoria Milo |
| Bantamweight (54kg) | (Russia) Elena Karpacheva | (France) Audrey Garcia | (Greece) Kalliopi Geitsidou (Finland) Camilla Munsterhjelm |
| Featherweight (57kg) | (Norway) Henriette Birkeland | (Hungary) Zsuzsanna Szuknai | (Russia) Galina Radionova (Sweden) Camilla Karlsson |
| Lightweight (60kg) | (Russia) Tatyana Chalaya | (Moldova) Elena Hadji | (France) Nacera Baghdad (Greece) Marina Chatzopoulou |
| Super lightweight (63kg) | (France) Myriam Lamare | (Greece) Nikoletta Kavka | (Russia) Yulia Nemtsova (Finland) Eva Wahlstroem |
| Welterweight (66kg) | (Russia) Irina Sinetskaya | (France) Esther Durand | (Hungary) Ivett Pruzsinszky (Finland) Hanne Rahkola |
| Super welterweight (71kg) | (Russia) Olga Slavinskaya | (Turkey) Nurhayat Hiçyakmazer | (Hungary) Anita Ducza (France) Emilie Cuenin |
| Middleweight (75kg) | (Russia) Svetlana Andreyeva | (Sweden) Anna Laurell | (Ukraine) Irina Korabelnikova (Turkey) Mehtap Bakış |
| Heavyweight (91kg) | (Russia) Olga Domouladzhanova | (France) Stephanie Bof | None awarded |
