= Lirika Matoshi =

American fashion designer

- Born: 1996 (age 29–30)
- Label: Lirika Matoshi
- Family: Teuta Matoshi (sister)
- Website: www.lirikamatoshi.com

Lirika Matoshi (born 1996) is a Kosovar fashion designer based in New York City who gained prominence through the Internet. Matoshi is noted for her whimsical and feminine designs.

== Personal life ==
Matoshi grew up in Pristina, the capital of Kosovo and lived through the Kosovo War. She is one of nine siblings in a Kosovo Albanian family. Her older sister Teuta Matoshi is also a fashion designer. Another sister, Sanije, also helps with the businesses.

== Career ==
Matoshi moved to the U.S. in 2016 to pursue a degree from the Fashion Institute of Technology. When her application was rejected she continued to design independently from a studio in the Bronx.

Matoshi made headlines in 2017 when she customized a pair of tights by embellishing them. After posting an image of the tights on her personal Instagram page the image was shared by numerous fashion bloggers and Matoshi began selling versions of the tights after receiving requests for them. In 2017, one of her designs was also worn by singer Elle King to the Grammy Awards.

In 2020, another of Matoshi's designs similarly went viral. Made of a tulle fabric featuring a pattern of glittered strawberries, the dress led to a 1000% increase in sales for Matoshi. Vogue dubbed Matoshi's design "the dress of the summer".

Lirika Matoshi received recognition from the Minister of Culture, Youth, and Sports in Kosovo, Vlora Dumoshi, and Deputy Minister, Halil Matoshi, in August 2020.

== See also ==
- Cottagecore
