= Teuta Matoshi =

Kosovar fashion designer

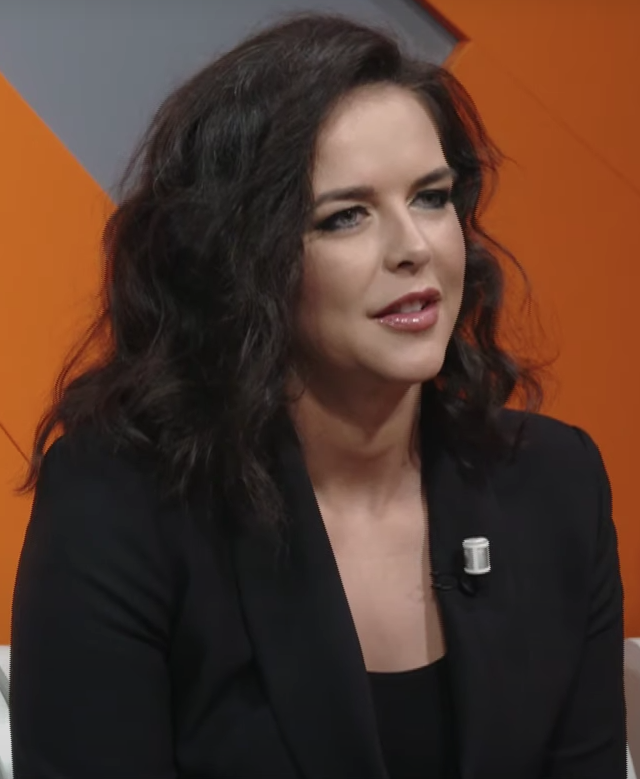
- Matoshi on T7 in 2019
- Born: 24 October
- Education: Design Factory; University of Pristina
- Spouse: Artan Duriqi
- Children: 3
- Family: Lirika Matoshi (sister)
- Website: teutamatoshi.com

Teuta Matoshi (born 24 October) is a Kosovar fashion designer. She is known for her whimsical style of high-end gowns.

== Early life and education ==
Matoshi was born outside of Pristina to a Kosovo Albanian family of 9 children, their father a teacher and their mother a stay-at-home mother. Her younger sister, Lirika Matoshi, is also a fashion designer and another sister, Sanije, helps with the businesses. Teuta studied at Design Factory and the University of Pristina Faculty of Arts.

== Career ==
Matoshi started designing at a young age. She launched her line in 2007 and later opened a shop in Pristina where she initially sold jackets before shifting her focus. She makes a point of giving as many jobs to local women in Kosovo as possible. She gained national as well as international attention for her "princess-like" gowns. She opened an atelier in SoHo, Manhattan with her sister in 2019 that houses both of their brands. They make a point of employing local women in Kosovo. In 2022 she designed a custom wedding dress for YouTuber, Mia Maples.

== Personal life ==
Matoshi is married to Artan Duriqi; they have a daughter and two sons.
