= Teuta Cuni =

Swedish boxer (born 1973)

Teuta Cuni (born 1973) is a retired Swedish amateur female lightweight boxer who has also practiced, but not competed in, kickboxing.

== Medals ==
- Women's World Amateur Boxing Championships

- 2001, Scranton – Bronze

- Women's European Amateur Boxing Championships

- 2000 – Gold

- Women's Swedish Amateur Boxing Championships

- 2000, Gävle – Gold
- 2005, Umeå – Gold
- 2006, Uppsala – Gold
- 2007, Sundsvall – Gold

- Witch Cup

- 2004, Pécs – Bronze
