= European Amateur Boxing Championships =

Boxing competitions

- Status: Active
- Genre: Sports event
- Date: Midyear
- Frequency: Annual
- Inaugurated: 1925 / 2001
- Organiser: EUBC

The European Amateur Boxing Championships is the highest competition for boxing amateurs in Europe, organised by the continent's governing body EUBC, which stands for the European Boxing Confederation. The first edition of the tournament took place in 1924, although the first 'competitive' championships were hosted by the city of Stockholm (Sweden) in 1925.

== EUBC events ==
In 2008 AIBA changed names of age groups (Junior->Youth, Cadet->Junior).

| Number | Events | Inaugurated |
|---|---|---|
| 1 | European Amateur Boxing Championships | 1925 |
| 2 | European Union Boxing Championships | 2003 |
| 3 | European U22 Boxing Championships (U22) | 2012 |
| 4 | European Youth Boxing Championships (U19) | 1970 |
| 5 | European Junior Boxing Championships (U17) | 1996 |
| 6 | European School Boxing Championships (U15) | 2003 |

== Editions ==
=== Men ===
| Number | Year | Host | Dates | Events |
|---|---|---|---|---|
| 1 | 1925 | Stockholm, Sweden | May 5–7 | 8 |
| 2 | 1927 | Berlin, Germany | May 16–30 | 8 |
| 3 | 1930 | Budapest, Hungary | June 3–8 | 8 |
| 4 | 1934 | Budapest, Hungary | April 11–15 | 8 |
| 5 | 1937 | Milan, Italy | May 5–9 | 8 |
| 6 | 1939 | (Republic of Ireland) Dublin, Ireland | April 18–22 | 8 |
| – | 1942 | Breslau, Germany | January 20–25 | 8 |
| 7 | 1947 | (Republic of Ireland) Dublin, Ireland | May 12–17 | 8 |
| 8 | 1949 | Oslo, Norway | June 13–18 | 8 |
| 9 | 1951 | Milan, Italy | May 14–19 | 10 |
| 10 | 1953 | Warsaw, Poland | May 18–24 | 10 |
| 11 | 1955 | West Berlin, West Germany | May 27 – June 5 | 10 |
| 12 | 1957 | Prague, Czechoslovakia | May 25 – June 2 | 10 |
| 13 | 1959 | Lucerne, Switzerland | May 24–31 | 10 |
| 14 | 1961 | (Socialist Federal Republic of Yugoslavia) Belgrade, Yugoslavia | June 3–10 | 10 |
| 15 | 1963 | Moscow, Soviet Union | May 26 – June 2 | 10 |
| 16 | 1965 | East Berlin, East Germany | May 21–29 | 10 |
| 17 | 1967 | Rome, Italy | May 25 – June 2 | 10 |
| 18 | 1969 | Bucharest, Romania | May 31 – June 8 | 11 |
| 19 | 1971 | Madrid, Spain | June 11–19 | 11 |
| 20 | 1973 | (Socialist Federal Republic of Yugoslavia) Belgrade, Yugoslavia | June 1–9 | 11 |
| 21 | 1975 | Katowice, Poland | June 1–8 | 11 |
| 22 | 1977 | Halle, East Germany | May 28 – June 5 | 11 |
| 23 | 1979 | Cologne, West Germany | May 5–12 | 12 |
| 24 | 1981 | Tampere, Finland | May 2–10 | 12 |
| 25 | 1983 | Varna, Bulgaria | May 7–15 | 12 |
| 26 | 1985 | Budapest, Hungary | May 25 – June 2 | 12 |
| 27 | 1987 | Turin, Italy | May 30 – June 7 | 12 |
| 28 | 1989 | Athens, Greece | May 29 – June 3 | 12 |
| 29 | 1991 | Gothenburg, Sweden | May 7–12 | 12 |
| 30 | 1993 | Bursa, Turkey | September 6–12 | 12 |
| 31 | 1996 | Vejle, Denmark | March 30 – April 7 | 12 |
| 32 | 1998 | Minsk, Belarus | May 17–24 | 12 |
| 33 | 2000 | Tampere, Finland | May 13–21 | 12 |
| 34 | 2002 | Perm, Russia | July 12–21 | 12 |
| 35 | 2004 | Pula, Croatia | February 19–29 | 11 |
| 36 | 2006 | Plovdiv, Bulgaria | July 13–23 | 11 |
| 37 | 2008 | Liverpool, United Kingdom | November 5–15 | 11 |
| 38 | 2010 | Moscow, Russia | June 4–13 | 11 |
| 39 | 2011 | Ankara, Turkey | June 17–24 | 10 |
| 40 | 2013 | Minsk, Belarus | June 1–8 | 10 |
| 41 | 2015 | Samokov, Bulgaria | August 6–15 | 10 |
| 42 | 2017 | Kharkiv, Ukraine | June 14–26 | 10 |
| 43 | 2019 | Minsk, Belarus | June 21–30 | 10 |
| 44 | 2022 | Yerevan, Armenia | May 21–31 | 13 |
| 45 | 2024 | Belgrade, Serbia | April 18–28 | 13 |

Notes

- ^{^{A}} After World War II, the results were annulled by AIBA (1942).
- ^{^{E}} Held as part of the 2019 European Games.

=== Women ===
| Number | Year | Host | Dates | Events |
|---|---|---|---|---|
| 1 | 2001 | Saint-Amand-les-Eaux, France | April 10–14 | 11 |
| 2 | 2003 | Pécs, Hungary | May 11–17 | 13 |
| 3 | 2004 | Riccione, Italy | October 3–10 | 13 |
| 4 | 2005 | Tønsberg, Norway | May 8–15 | 13 |
| 5 | 2006 | Warsaw, Poland | September 3–10 | 13 |
| 6 | 2007 | Vejle, Denmark | October 15–20 | 13 |
| 7 | 2009 | Mykolaiv, Ukraine | September 14–21 | 11 |
| 8 | 2011 | Rotterdam, Netherlands | October 17–22 | 10 |
| 9 | 2014 | Bucharest, Romania | May 31 – June 7 | 10 |
| 10 | 2016 | Sofia, Bulgaria | November 14–24 | 10 |
| 11 | 2018 | Sofia, Bulgaria | June 4–13 | 10 |
| 12 | 2019 | Alcobendas, Spain | August 22 – September 1 | 10 |
| 13 | 2022 | Budva, Montenegro | October 14–22 | 12 |
| 14 | 2024 | Belgrade, Serbia | April 18–28 | 12 |

== Medals ==
Two bronze medals awarded from 1951 European Amateur Boxing Championships. Two bronze medals not awarded in 2001 Women's European Amateur Boxing Championships because of lake of competitors.

=== Men (1925–2024) ===
As of 2024 European Amateur Boxing Championships (Exclude 1942).

| Rank | Nation | Gold | Silver | Bronze | Total |
|---|---|---|---|---|---|
| 1 | Soviet Union | 93 | 35 | 36 | 164 |
| 2 | Russia | 71 | 23 | 18 | 112 |
| 3 | Poland | 34 | 33 | 53 | 120 |
| 4 | Bulgaria | 25 | 36 | 57 | 118 |
| 5 | Italy | 25 | 31 | 59 | 115 |
| 6 | Hungary | 24 | 33 | 62 | 119 |
| 7 | Germany | 21 | 20 | 33 | 74 |
| 8 | East Germany | 19 | 25 | 42 | 86 |
| 9 | Ukraine | 16 | 13 | 29 | 58 |
| 10 | Ireland | 15 | 8 | 34 | 57 |
| 11 | Romania | 14 | 32 | 74 | 120 |
| 12 | West Germany | 13 | 13 | 23 | 49 |
| 13 | England | 12 | 21 | 28 | 61 |
| 14 | Sweden | 10 | 10 | 21 | 41 |
| 15 | France | 8 | 20 | 32 | 60 |
| 16 | Turkey | 7 | 9 | 23 | 39 |
| 17 | Armenia | 7 | 7 | 19 | 33 |
| 18 | Yugoslavia | 6 | 18 | 28 | 52 |
| 19 | Azerbaijan | 5 | 7 | 11 | 23 |
| 20 | Denmark | 5 | 6 | 12 | 23 |
| 20 | Spain | 5 | 6 | 12 | 23 |
| 22 | Netherlands | 4 | 10 | 10 | 24 |
| 23 | Georgia | 4 | 9 | 10 | 23 |
| 24 | Finland | 4 | 3 | 26 | 33 |
| 25 | Belarus | 3 | 10 | 16 | 29 |
| 26 | Czechoslovakia | 3 | 6 | 21 | 30 |
| 27 | Belgium | 3 | 2 | 6 | 11 |
| 27 | Serbia | 3 | 2 | 6 | 11 |
| 29 | Wales | 3 | 1 | 5 | 9 |
| 30 | Great Britain | 2 | 5 | 5 | 12 |
| 31 | Croatia | 2 | 3 | 9 | 14 |
| 32 | Lithuania | 2 | 1 | 5 | 8 |
| 33 | Moldova | 1 | 3 | 9 | 13 |
| 34 | Scotland | 1 | 2 | 12 | 15 |
| 35 | Austria | 1 | 2 | 9 | 12 |
| 36 | Estonia | 1 | 2 | 0 | 3 |
| 37 | Norway | 1 | 1 | 6 | 8 |
| 38 | Greece | 0 | 2 | 2 | 4 |
| 39 | Switzerland | 0 | 1 | 4 | 5 |
| 40 | Czech Republic | 0 | 1 | 1 | 2 |
| 41 | Egypt | 0 | 1 | 0 | 1 |
| 42 | Israel | 0 | 0 | 4 | 4 |
| 43 | (Federal Republic of Yugoslavia) FR Yugoslavia | 0 | 0 | 2 | 2 |
| 43 | Latvia | 0 | 0 | 2 | 2 |
| 43 | North Macedonia | 0 | 0 | 2 | 2 |
| 43 | Slovakia | 0 | 0 | 2 | 2 |
| 47 | Bosnia and Herzegovina | 0 | 0 | 1 | 1 |
| 47 | Montenegro | 0 | 0 | 1 | 1 |
| Totals (48 entries) | | 473 | 473 | 882 | 1,828 |

=== Women (2001–2024) ===
As of 2024 European Amateur Boxing Championships.

| Rank | Nation | Gold | Silver | Bronze | Total |
|---|---|---|---|---|---|
| 1 | Russia | 50 | 29 | 34 | 113 |
| 2 | Turkey | 17 | 17 | 39 | 73 |
| 3 | Ireland | 12 | 2 | 9 | 23 |
| 4 | Ukraine | 11 | 14 | 41 | 66 |
| 5 | Italy | 10 | 4 | 18 | 32 |
| 6 | Bulgaria | 9 | 7 | 12 | 28 |
| 7 | Romania | 9 | 5 | 26 | 40 |
| 8 | France | 6 | 12 | 19 | 37 |
| 9 | Hungary | 5 | 12 | 22 | 39 |
| 10 | Norway | 5 | 5 | 4 | 14 |
| 11 | Poland | 4 | 17 | 17 | 38 |
| 12 | Sweden | 4 | 8 | 9 | 21 |
| 13 | Finland | 3 | 3 | 8 | 14 |
| 14 | Serbia | 3 | 1 | 8 | 12 |
| 15 | Netherlands | 3 | 1 | 1 | 5 |
| 16 | England | 2 | 6 | 5 | 13 |
| 17 | Azerbaijan | 2 | 2 | 4 | 8 |
| 18 | Denmark | 2 | 1 | 3 | 6 |
| 19 | Germany | 1 | 3 | 6 | 10 |
| 20 | Armenia | 1 | 1 | 4 | 6 |
| 21 | Moldova | 1 | 1 | 1 | 3 |
| 22 | Lithuania | 1 | 0 | 2 | 3 |
| 23 | Wales | 0 | 2 | 4 | 6 |
| 24 | Switzerland | 0 | 2 | 0 | 2 |
| 25 | Belarus | 0 | 1 | 7 | 8 |
| 26 | Greece | 0 | 1 | 6 | 7 |
| 27 | Czech Republic | 0 | 1 | 4 | 5 |
| 28 | Croatia | 0 | 1 | 3 | 4 |
| 29 | Montenegro | 0 | 1 | 1 | 2 |
| 30 | Israel | 0 | 1 | 0 | 1 |
| 31 | Slovakia | 0 | 0 | 2 | 2 |
| 32 | Kosovo | 0 | 0 | 1 | 1 |
| Totals (32 entries) | | 161 | 161 | 320 | 642 |

=== Combined (Men and Women) (1925–2024) ===
As of 2024 European Amateur Boxing Championships (Exclude 1942).

| Rank | Nation | Gold | Silver | Bronze | Total |
|---|---|---|---|---|---|
| 1 | Russia | 121 | 52 | 52 | 225 |
| 2 | Soviet Union | 93 | 35 | 36 | 164 |
| 3 | Poland | 38 | 50 | 70 | 158 |
| 4 | Italy | 35 | 35 | 77 | 147 |
| 5 | Bulgaria | 34 | 43 | 69 | 146 |
| 6 | Hungary | 29 | 45 | 84 | 158 |
| 7 | Ukraine | 27 | 27 | 70 | 124 |
| 8 | Ireland | 27 | 10 | 43 | 80 |
| 9 | Turkey | 24 | 26 | 62 | 112 |
| 10 | Romania | 23 | 37 | 100 | 160 |
| 11 | Germany | 22 | 23 | 39 | 84 |
| 12 | East Germany | 19 | 25 | 42 | 86 |
| 13 | France | 14 | 32 | 51 | 97 |
| 14 | England | 14 | 27 | 33 | 74 |
| 15 | Sweden | 14 | 18 | 30 | 62 |
| 16 | West Germany | 13 | 13 | 23 | 49 |
| 17 | Armenia | 8 | 8 | 23 | 39 |
| 18 | Netherlands | 7 | 11 | 11 | 29 |
| 19 | Azerbaijan | 7 | 9 | 15 | 31 |
| 20 | Denmark | 7 | 7 | 15 | 29 |
| 21 | Finland | 7 | 6 | 34 | 47 |
| 22 | Yugoslavia | 6 | 18 | 28 | 52 |
| 23 | Norway | 6 | 6 | 10 | 22 |
| 24 | Serbia | 6 | 3 | 14 | 23 |
| 25 | Spain | 5 | 6 | 12 | 23 |
| 26 | Georgia | 4 | 9 | 10 | 23 |
| 27 | Belarus | 3 | 11 | 23 | 37 |
| 28 | Czechoslovakia | 3 | 6 | 21 | 30 |
| 29 | Wales | 3 | 3 | 9 | 15 |
| 30 | Belgium | 3 | 2 | 6 | 11 |
| 31 | Lithuania | 3 | 1 | 7 | 11 |
| 32 | Great Britain | 2 | 5 | 5 | 12 |
| 33 | Croatia | 2 | 4 | 12 | 18 |
| 34 | Moldova | 2 | 4 | 10 | 16 |
| 35 | Scotland | 1 | 2 | 12 | 15 |
| 36 | Austria | 1 | 2 | 9 | 12 |
| 37 | Estonia | 1 | 2 | 0 | 3 |
| 38 | Greece | 0 | 3 | 8 | 11 |
| 39 | Switzerland | 0 | 3 | 4 | 7 |
| 40 | Czech Republic | 0 | 2 | 5 | 7 |
| 41 | Israel | 0 | 1 | 4 | 5 |
| 42 | Montenegro | 0 | 1 | 2 | 3 |
| 43 | Egypt | 0 | 1 | 0 | 1 |
| 44 | Slovakia | 0 | 0 | 4 | 4 |
| 45 | (Federal Republic of Yugoslavia) FR Yugoslavia | 0 | 0 | 2 | 2 |
| 45 | Latvia | 0 | 0 | 2 | 2 |
| 45 | North Macedonia | 0 | 0 | 2 | 2 |
| 48 | Bosnia and Herzegovina | 0 | 0 | 1 | 1 |
| 48 | Kosovo | 0 | 0 | 1 | 1 |
| Totals (49 entries) | | 634 | 634 | 1,202 | 2,470 |

== Multiple gold medalists ==
Boldface denotes active amateur boxers and highest medal count among all boxers (including these who not included in these tables) per type.

=== Men ===
| Rank | Boxer | Country | Weights | From | To | Gold | Silver | Bronze | Total |
|---|---|---|---|---|---|---|---|---|---|
| 1 | Ivailo (Ismail) Marinov (Mustafov, Khristov) | Bulgaria | 48 kg | 1981 | 1991 | **4** | 1 | – | **5** |
| 2 | Zbigniew Pietrzykowski | Poland | 71 kg / 75 kg / 81 kg | 1953 | 1963 | **4** | – | 1 | **5** |
| 3 | Andrey Abramov | Soviet Union | +81 kg | 1957 | 1963 | 3 | 1 | – | 4 |
| 3 | Georgy Balakshin | Russia | 51 kg / 52 kg | 2002 | 2011 | 3 | 1 | – | 4 |
| 3 | Oleg Grigoryev | Soviet Union | 54 kg | 1957 | 1965 | 3 | 1 | – | 4 |
| 3 | Sergey Kazakov | Russia | 48 kg | 1998 | 2004 | 3 | 1 | – | 4 |
| 3 | Ramaz (Ramazan) Paliani | Georgia; Russia; Turkey | 57 kg | 1993 | 2000 | 3 | 1 | – | 4 |
| 3 | Danas (Dan) Pozniakas (Pozniak) | Soviet Union | 81 kg | 1963 | 1969 | 3 | 1 | – | 4 |
| 3 | Serafim Todorov | Bulgaria | 54 kg / 57 kg | 1989 | 1996 | 3 | 1 | – | 4 |
| 3 | Alexander Yagubkin | Soviet Union | 91 kg / +91 kg | 1981 | 1987 | 3 | 1 | – | 4 |

=== Women ===
| Rank | Boxer | Country | Weights | From | To | Gold | Silver | Bronze | Total |
|---|---|---|---|---|---|---|---|---|---|
| 1 | Katie Taylor | Ireland | 60 kg | 2005 | 2014 | **6** | – | – | 6 |
| 2 | Irina Sinetskaya | Russia | 67 kg / 66 kg / 75 kg / +81 kg | 2001 | 2011 | 5 | 1 | – | 6 |
| 3 | Mária Kovács | Hungary | 86 kg / 81 kg / +81 kg | 2003 | 2014 | 4 | 2 | 1 | **7** |
| 4 | Sofya Ochigava | Russia | 52 kg / 54 kg / 57 kg / 60 kg | 2005 | 2014 | 3 | 1 | 2 | 6 |
| 5 | Anna Laurell | Sweden | 75 kg | 2001 | 2007 | 3 | 1 | 1 | 5 |
| 6 | **Buse Naz Çakıroğlu** | Turkey | 51 kg / 50 kg / 52 kg | 2018 | 2024 | 3 | 1 | – | 4 |
| 7 | Steluța Duță | Romania | 48 kg / 46 kg | 2005 | 2018 | 3 | – | **4** | **7** |
| 8 | Gülsüm Tatar | Turkey | 60 kg / 64 kg | 2004 | 2011 | 3 | – | 2 | 5 |
| 9 | Marzia Davide | Italy | 54 kg / 57 kg | 2003 | 2014 | 3 | – | 1 | 4 |
| 10 | Simona Galassi | Italy | 50 kg | 2003 | 2005 | 3 | – | – | 3 |
| 10 | **Aoife O'Rourke** | Ireland | 75 kg | 2019 | 2024 | 3 | – | – | 3 |
| 10 | Olga Slavinskaya | Russia | 71 kg / 70 kg | 2001 | 2006 | 3 | – | – | 3 |

== European U22 Boxing Championships ==
| Number | Year | Host | Events |
|---|---|---|---|
| 1 | 2012 | Russia | 10 |
| 2 | 2017 | Romania, Brăila | 20 |
| 3 | 2018 | Romania, Târgu Jiu | 20 |
| 4 | 2019 | Russia, Vladikavkaz | 20 |
| 5 | 2021 | Italy, Roseto | 20 |
| 6 | 2022 | Croatia, Poreč | 25 |
| 7 | 2023 | Montenegro, Budva | 25 |
| 8 | 2024 | Bulgaria, Sofia | 25 |

== European Youth Boxing Championships (U19) ==
- 1970–1982 : U20
- 1984–Now: U19
- In 2008 AIBA changed names of age groups (Junior->Youth, Cadet->Junior).

=== Men ===
| Number | Year | Host | Events |
|---|---|---|---|
European Junior Boxing Championships
| 1 | 1970 | Hungary | |
| 2 | 1972 | Romania | |
| 3 | 1974 | Soviet Union | |
| 4 | 1976 | Turkey | |
| 5 | 1978 | Ireland | |
| 6 | 1980 | Italy | |
| 7 | 1982 | East Germany | |
| 8 | 1984 | Finland | |
| 9 | 1986 | Denmark | |
| 10 | 1988 | Poland | |
| 11 | 1990 | Czechoslovakia | |
| 12 | 1992 | Scotland | |
| 13 | 1993 | Greece | |
| 14 | 1995 | Hungary | |
| 15 | 1997 | England | |
| 16 | 1999 | Croatia | |
| 17 | 2001 | Bosnia and Herzegovina | |
| 18 | 2003 | Poland | |
| 19 | 2005 | Estonia | |
| 20 | 2007 | Serbia | |
European Youth Boxing Championships
| 21 | 2009 | Poland | |
| 22 | 2011 | Ireland | |
| 23 | 2013 | Netherlands | |
| 24 | 2014 | Croatia | |
| 25 | 2015 | Poland | |
| 26 | 2016 | Russia | |
| 27 | 2017 | Turkey | |
| 28 | 2018 | Italy | |

=== Women ===
| Number | Year | Host | Events |
|---|---|---|---|
European Women Youth Boxing Championships
| 1 | 2008 | Bulgaria | |
| 2 | 2010 | France | |
| 3 | 2011 | Russia | |
| 4 | 2012 | Poland | |
| 5 | 2014 | Italy | |
| 6 | 2015 | Hungary | |
| 7 | 2016 | Turkey | |
| 8 | 2017 | Bulgaria | |
| 9 | 2018 | Italy | |

=== Combined (Men and Women) ===
| Number | Year | Host | Events |
|---|---|---|---|
European Youth Boxing Championships
| 29 | 2019 | Bulgaria | 20 |
| 30 | 2020 | Montenegro | 20 |
| 31 | 2021 | Montenegro | 25 |
| 32 | 2022 | Bulgaria | 25 |
| 33 | 2023 | Armenia | 25 |
| 34 | 2024 | Croatia | 25 |
| 35 | 2025 | Armenia | 25 |

== European Junior Boxing Championships (U17) ==
- In 2008 AIBA changed names of age groups (Junior->Youth, Cadet->Junior).

=== Men ===
| Number | Year | Host | Events |
|---|---|---|---|
Unofficial European Cadet Boxing Championships
| 1 | 1992 | Italy | |
| 2 | 1993 | Italy | |
| 3 | 1994 | Greece | |
| 4 | 1995 | Israel | |
Official European Cadet Boxing Championships
| 1 | 1996 | Italy | |
| 2 | 1997 | North Macedonia | |
| 3 | 1998 | Latvia | |
| 4 | 1999 | Azerbaijan | |
| 5 | 2000 | Greece | |
| 6 | 2001 | England | |
| 7 | 2002 | Ukraine | |
| 8 | 2003 | Lithuania | |
| 9 | 2004 | Russia | |
| 10 | 2005 | Hungary | |
| 11 | 2006 | Albania | |
| 12 | 2007 | Hungary | |
European Junior Boxing Championships
| 13 | 2008 | Bulgaria | |
| 14 | 2010 | Ukraine | |
| 15 | 2011 | Hungary | |
| 16 | 2012 | Bulgaria | |
| 17 | 2013 | Russia | |
| 18 | 2014 | Russia | |
| 19 | 2015 | Ukraine | |
| 20 | 2016 | Hungary | |
| 21 | 2017 | Bulgaria | |
| 22 | 2018 | Russia | |

=== Women ===
| Number | Year | Host | Events |
|---|---|---|---|
European Women Junior Boxing Championships
| 1 | 2008 | Bulgaria | |
| 2 | 2010 | France | |
| 3 | 2011 | Russia | |
| 4 | 2012 | Poland | |
| 5 | 2014 | Italy | |
| 6 | 2015 | Hungary | |
| 7 | 2016 | Turkey | |
| 8 | 2017 | Bulgaria | |
| 9 | 2018 | Russia | |

=== Combined (Men and Women) ===
| Number | Year | Host | Events |
|---|---|---|---|
European Junior Boxing Championships
| 23 | 2019 | Romania | 20 |
| 24 | 2020 | Bulgaria | 20 |
| 25 | 2021 | Georgia | 20 |
| 26 | 2022 | Italy | 20 |
| 27 | 2023 | Romania | 20 |
| 28 | 2024 | Bosnia and Herzegovina | 20 |
| 29 | 2025 | Serbia | 20 |

== European School Boxing Championships (U15) ==
| Number | Year | Host | Events |
|---|---|---|---|
European Schoolboys Championships
| 1 | 2003 | Italy | 13 |
| 2 | 2004 | Hungary | 13 |
| 3 | 2005 | Russia | 13 |
| 4 | 2006 | Ukraine | 13 |
| 5 | 2007 | England | 13 |
| 6 | 2008 | Serbia | 13 |
| 7 | 2009 | Russia | 13 |
| 8 | 2010 | Bulgaria | 13 |
| 9 | 2011 | Russia | 13 |
| 10 | 2012 | Russia | 13 |
| 11 | 2013 | Ireland | 13 |
| 12 | 2014 | Hungary | 13 |
| 13 | 2015 | Russia | 13 |
| 14 | 2016 | Croatia | 13 |
| 15 | 2017 | Romania | 13 |
European Schoolboys and Schoolgirls Championships
| 16 | 2018 | Bulgaria | 26 |
| 17 | 2019 | Georgia | 26 |
| 18 | 2021 | Bosnia and Herzegovina | 26 |
| 19 | 2022 | Turkey | |
| 20 | 2023 | Slovenia | |
| 21 | 2024 | Bosnia and Herzegovina | 29 |

== European Military Boxing Championships ==
| Number | Year | Host | Events |
|---|---|---|---|
| 1 | 2012 | Estonia | |

== European Students Boxing Championships ==
| Number | Year | Host | Events |
|---|---|---|---|
| 1 | 2009 | Russia | |
| 1 | 2011 | Russia | |

== EUBC European Boxing Cup ==
=== Men ===
1.EUBC European Cup – Kharkov, Ukraine – October 22–23, 2010

=== Women ===
1.European Cup – Koeping, Sweden – June 8–12, 1999

2.European Cup – Macon, France – April 6–9, 2000

== Balkan Boxing Championships ==
1.Balkan Championships – Bucharest, Romania – May 19–25, 1947

2.Balkan Championships – Istanbul, Turkey – April 15–17, 1960

3.Balkan Championships – Bucharest, Romania – July 11–15, 1961

4.Balkan Championships – Sofia, Bulgaria – May 23–25, 1962

5.Balkan Championships – Belgrade, Yugoslavia – May 27–29, 1966

6.Balkan Championships – Istanbul, Turkey – April 19–22, 1967

7.Balkan Championships – Galati, Romania – September 11–14, 1969

8.Balkan Championships – Varna, Bulgaria – May 20–23, 1970

9.Balkan Championships – Titograd, Yugoslavia – April 28 – May 2, 1971

10.Balkan Championships – Ankara, Turkey – May 16–20, 1972

11.Balkan Championships – Athens, Greece – May 3–7, 1973

12.Balkan Championships – Constanta, Romania – June 25–29, 1974

13.Balkan Championships – Sofia, Bulgaria – July 23–27, 1975

14.Balkan Championships – Zagreb, Yugoslavia – June 3–6, 1976

15.Balkan Championships – Bursa, Turkey – September 22–25, 1977

16.Balkan Championships – Athens, Greece – October 1–4, 1978

17.Balkan Championships – Tulcea, Romania – July 3–7, 1979

18.Balkan Championships – Pernik, Bulgaria – October 29 – November 1, 1980

19.Balkan Championships – Pula, Yugoslavia – October 1–4, 1981

20.Balkan Championships – Bursa, Turkey – October 27–31, 1982

21.Balkan Championships – Athens, Greece – November 27–30, 1983

22.Balkan Championships – Braila, Romania – September 1984

23.Balkan Championships – Sofia, Bulgaria – September 21–23, 1985

Balkan Championships – Pristina, Yugoslavia – June 25–28, 1987

Balkan Championships – Patras, Greece – November 20–25, 1990

Balkan Championships – Antalya, Turkey – December 11–14, 2019

Balkan Championships – Zagreb, Croatia – May 6–9, 2021

1.Balkan U-20 Championships – Bursa, Turkey – September 18–21, 1975

2.Balkan U-20 Championships – Braila, Romania – August 25–28, 1976

3.Balkan U-20 Championships – Athens, Greece – July 19–24, 1977

4.Balkan U-20 Championships – Slavonski Brod, Yugoslavia – April 14–16, 1978

5.Balkan U-20 Championships – Gabrovo, Bulgaria – June 5–6, 1979

6.Balkan U-20 Championships – Izmir, Turkey – December 3–7, 1980

7.Balkan U-20 Championships – Galati, Romania – December 15–19, 1981

8.Balkan U-20 Championships – Thessaloniki, Greece – October 7–10, 1982

10.Balkan U-20 Championships – Adapazarı, Turkey – December 5–8, 1985

Balkan U-20 Championships – Patras, Greece – November 1987

1.Balkan Olympic Days – Sofia, Bulgaria – 1997

2.Balkan Olympic Days – Ohrid, Macedonia – June 28–29, 2002

== Nordic Boxing Championships ==
1.Nordic Championships – Copenhagen, Denmark – February 11–13, 1955

2.Nordic Championships – Helsinki, Finland – April 28–29, 1957

3.Nordic Championships – Stockholm, Sweden – April 16–17, 1959

4.Nordic Championships – Oslo, Norway – April 13–14, 1961

5.Nordic Championships – Helsinki, Finland – April 4–5, 1963

6.Nordic Championships – Copenhagen, Denmark – April 1–2, 1965

7.Nordic Championships – Stockholm, Sweden – April 3–4, 1967

8.Nordic Championships – Oslo, Norway – March 23–24, 1969

9.Nordic Championships – Helsinki, Finland – April 2–3, 1970

10.Nordic Championships – Copenhagen, Denmark – April 7–8, 1972

11.Nordic Championships – Stockholm, Sweden – July 1974

12.Nordic Championships – Stockholm, Sweden – April 1976

Nordic Junior Championships – Oslo, Norway – March 31 – April 1, 1979

14.Nordic Championships – Copenhagen, Denmark – March 29–30, 1980

15.Nordic Championships – Stockholm, Sweden – March 1982

16.Nordic Championships – Bergen, Norway – April 7–8, 1984

17.Nordic Championships – Helsinki, Finland – July 1986

18.Nordic Championships – Roskilde, Denmark – March 26–27, 1988

19.Nordic Championships – Helsingborg, Sweden – March 24–25, 1990

Nordic Junior Championships – Ringsted, Denmark – March 23–24, 1991

20.Nordic Championships – Oslo, Norway – April 3–4, 1992

Nordic Junior Championships – Norway – March 1998

Nordic Junior & Women Championships – Uppsala, Sweden – March 25–26, 2000

Nordic Junior & Women Championships – Give, Denmark – March 31 – April 1, 2001

Nordic Junior & Women Championships – Moss, Norway – March 23–24, 2002

Nordic Junior & Women Championships – Lahti, Finland – March 22–23, 2003

Nordic Junior & Women Championships – Stockholm, Sweden – March 27–28, 2004

Nordic Junior & Women Championships – Tonsberg, Norway – March 25–26, 2006

Nordic Junior & Women Championships – Loviisa, Finland – March 24–25, 2007

Nordic Junior & Women Championships – Lund, Sweden – March 29–30, 2008

Nordic Championships – Aabybro, Denmark – April 4–5, 2009

Nordic Championships – Oslo, Norway – March 20–21, 2010

Nordic Championships – Lahti, Finland – March 26–27, 2011

Nordic Championships – Stockholm, Sweden – March 24–25, 2012

Nordic Championships – Aarhus, Denmark – March 23–24, 2013

Nordic Championships – Tampere, Finland – March 28–29, 2015

Nordic Championships – Gothenburg, Sweden – March 26–27, 2016

Nordic Championships – Gilleleje, Denmark – April 1–2, 2017

Nordic Championships – Oslo, Norway – March 24–25, 2018

Nordic Championships – Tampere, Finland – March 30–31, 2019

Nordic Championships – Reykjanesbaer, Iceland – March 25–27, 2022

== Open Championship ==
Boxing (specifically European Boxing) have many Memorial Tournament. 69th Bocskai István Memorial Tournament, one of the most traditional boxing tournaments in Europe in 2025.

== See also ==
- World Amateur Boxing Championships
- AIBA Youth World Boxing Championships
- European Boxing Championships - affiliated with World Boxing
- European Union Amateur Boxing Championships
- Boxing at the 2015 European Games
- Boxing at the 2019 European Games
