= 2016 AIBA Women's World Boxing Championships – Flyweight =

Boxing competitions

Flyweight at the 2016 AIBA Women's World Boxing Championships
- Dates: 19–27 May
- Competitors: 49 from 49 nations

Medalists
gold medal	Nicola Adams	Great Britain
silver medal	Peamwilai Laopeam	Thailand
bronze medal	Zhaina Shekerbekova	Kazakhstan
bronze medal	Sarah Ourahmoune	France

The Flyweight (51 kg) competition at the 2016 AIBA Women's World Boxing Championships was held from 19 to 27 May 2016.

== Draw ==
=== Preliminaries ===
	Result	
(Hungary) Katalin Ancsin	2–0	(Dominican Republic) Estéfani Almánzar
(India) Mary Kom	3–0	(Sweden) Juliana Söderström
(Germany) Azize Nimani	3–0	(Mongolia) Myagmardulamyn Nandintsetseg
(Norway) Marielle Hansen	3–0	(Moldova) Iulia Coroli
(Argentina) Clara Lescurat	DSQ	(Algeria) Souhila Bouchene
(Uzbekistan) Dilnozakhon Odiljonova	2–0	(Bolivia) Nadia Barriga
(United States) Virginia Fuchs	3–0	(Brazil) Grazieli Jesus de Sousa
(Jordan) Reem Al-Mriheel	TKO	(Greece) Antonia Papoutsaki
(Chinese Taipei) Lin Yu-ting	3–0	(Venezuela) Kartha Magliocco
(Belarus) Yana Burym	3–0	(Jamaica) Sarah-Joy Rae
(Poland) Sandra Drabik	3–0	(Croatia) Dunja Gorup
(Republic of Ireland) Ceire Smith	0–2	(Colombia) Ingrit Valencia
(Morocco) Zohra Ez-Zahraoui	3–0	(South Korea) Nam Eun-jin
(Ukraine) Tetyana Kob	0–3	(Armenia) Anush Grigoryan
(France) Sarah Ourahmoune	2–0	(Vietnam) Thị Bằng Lê
(Romania) Lăcrămioara Perijoc	2–1	(Mexico) Melissa Esquivel
(Sri Lanka) Anusha Koddithuwakku	0–3	(Australia) Kristy Harris

=== Main draw ===
Round of 32
21 May
(Italy) Marzia Davide	3
(Hungary) Katalin Ancsin	0
21 May
(India) Mary Kom	0
(Germany) Azize Nimani	2
21 May
(North Korea) Ri Hyang-mi	3
(Norway) Marielle Hansen	0
21 May
(Argentina) Clara Lescurat	0
(Kazakhstan) Zhaina Shekerbekova	3
21 May
(United Kingdom) Nicola Adams	3
(Uzbekistan) Dilnozakhon Odiljonova	0
21 May
(United States) Virginia Fuchs	0
(Azerbaijan) Anna Alimardanova	2
21 May
(Turkey) Elif Coşkun	1
(Greece) Antonia Papoutsaki	2
21 May
(Chinese Taipei) Lin Yu-ting	3
(Bulgaria) Stanimira Petrova	0
21 May
(Canada) Mandy Bujold	3
(Belarus) Yana Burym	0
21 May
(Poland) Sandra Drabik	3
(Spain) Lara García	0
21 May
(Thailand) Peamwilai Laopeam	2
(Colombia) Ingrit Valencia	1
21 May
(Morocco) Zohra Ez-Zahraoui	2
(Philippines) Nesthy Petecio	1
21 May
(Japan) Madoka Wada	0
(Armenia) Anush Grigoryan	3
21 May
(France) Sarah Ourahmoune	TKO
(Tunisia) Amel Chebbi
21 May
(China) Ren Cancan	2
(Romania) Lăcrămioara Perijoc	0
21 May
(Australia) Kristy Harris	0
(Russia) Elena Saveleva	3

Round of 16
23 May
(Italy) Marzia Davide	0
(Germany) Azize Nimani	2
23 May
(North Korea) Ri Hyang-mi	0
(Kazakhstan) Zhaina Shekerbekova	3
23 May
(United Kingdom) Nicola Adams	3
(Azerbaijan) Anna Alimardanova	0
23 May
(Greece) Antonia Papoutsaki	0
(Chinese Taipei) Lin Yu-ting	3
23 May
(Canada) Mandy Bujold	1
(Poland) Sandra Drabik	2
23 May
(Thailand) Peamwilai Laopeam	3
(Morocco) Zohra Ez-Zahraoui	0
23 May
(Armenia) Anush Grigoryan	0
(France) Sarah Ourahmoune	3
23 May
(China) Ren Cancan	3
(Russia) Elena Saveleva	0

Quarterfinals
24 May
(Germany) Azize Nimani	0
(Kazakhstan) Zhaina Shekerbekova	3
24 May
(United Kingdom) Nicola Adams	3
(Chinese Taipei) Lin Yu-ting	0
24 May
(Poland) Sandra Drabik	1
(Thailand) Peamwilai Laopeam	2
24 May
(France) Sarah Ourahmoune	WO
(China) Ren Cancan

Semifinals
26 May
(Kazakhstan) Zhaina Shekerbekova	0
(United Kingdom) Nicola Adams	3
26 May
(Thailand) Peamwilai Laopeam	2
(France) Sarah Ourahmoune	1

Final
27 May
(United Kingdom) Nicola Adams	2
(Thailand) Peamwilai Laopeam	1
