= 2018 AIBA Women's World Boxing Championships – Flyweight =

Boxing competitions

Flyweight at the 2018 AIBA Women's World Boxing Championships
- Dates: 15–24 November
- Competitors: 43 from 43 nations

Medalists
gold medal	Pang Chol-mi	North Korea
silver medal	Zhaina Shekerbekova	Kazakhstan
bronze medal	Tsukimi Namiki	Japan
bronze medal	Virginia Fuchs	United States

The Flyweight (51 kg) competition at the 2018 AIBA Women's World Boxing Championships was held from 15 to 24 November 2018.

== Draw ==
=== Preliminaries ===
	Result	
(Serbia) Nina Radovanović	1–4	(Italy) Roberta Mostarda
(Bulgaria) Gabriela Dimitrova	5–0	(Chinese Taipei) Chin Chian-huei
(Uzbekistan) Aziza Yokubova	2–3	(Japan) Tsukimi Namiki
(Russia) Svetlana Soluianova	0–5	(Kazakhstan) Zhaina Shekerbekova
(Germany) Ursula Gottlob	1-4	(Algeria) Ouidad Sfouh
(Philippines) Irish Magno	3–2	(Belarus) Yana Burym
(Scotland) Stephanie Kernachan	1–4	(South Korea) Jang Eun-a
(United States) Virginia Fuchs	5–0	(Ukraine) Tetiana Kob
(New Zealand) Tasmyn Benny	0–5	(North Korea) Pang Chol-mi
(France) Delphine Mancini	5–0	(Argentina) Clara Lescurat
(Indonesia) Ainun Azizah	0–5	(England) Ebonie Jones

=== Main draw ===
Round of 32
17 Nov
(Canada) Sara Hagnighat-Joo	4
(Italy) Roberta Mostarda	1
17 Nov
(Mongolia) Lutsaikhany Altantsetseg
(Brazil) Grazieli de Sousa	RSC
17 Nov
(Republic of Ireland) Ceire Smith	3
(Bulgaria) Gabriela Dimitrova	2
17 Nov
(Japan) Tsukimi Namiki	3
(Turkey) Buse Naz Çakıroğlu	2
17 Nov
(Democratic Republic of the Congo) Rosette Ndongala	0
(Kazakhstan) Zhaina Shekerbekova	5
17 Nov
(Colombia) Ingrit Valencia	5
(Australia) Viviana Ruiz	0
17 Nov
(Sweden) Lise Sandebjer	5
(Sri Lanka) Anusha Koddithuwakku	0
17 Nov
(Algeria) Ouidad Sfouh	0
(Poland) Sandra Drabik	5
17 Nov
(China) Chang Yuan	4
(Philippines) Irish Magno	1
17 Nov
(Mozambique) Benilde Macaringue
(Romania) Claudia Nechita	RSC
17 Nov
(Czech Republic) Petra Laštovková	0
(South Korea) Jang Eun-a	5
17 Nov
(United States) Virginia Fuchs	5
(Croatia) Anamarija Čvrk	0
17 Nov
(Nepal) Bimala Shrestha	0
(North Korea) Pang Chol-mi	5
17 Nov
(France) Delphine Mancini	2
(Thailand) Jutamas Jitpong	3
17 Nov
(India) Pinki Rani	4
(Armenia) Anush Grigoryan	1
17 Nov
(England) Ebonie Jones	5
(Spain) Andrea Lasheras	0

Round of 16
19 Nov
(Canada) Sara Hagnighat-Joo	0
(Brazil) Grazieli de Sousa	5
19 Nov
(Republic of Ireland) Ceire Smith	2
(Japan) Tsukimi Namiki	3
19 Nov
(Kazakhstan) Zhaina Shekerbekova	3
(Colombia) Ingrit Valencia	2
19 Nov
(Sweden) Lise Sandebjer	0
(Poland) Sandra Drabik	5
19 Nov
(China) Chang Yuan	5
(Romania) Claudia Nechita	0
19 Nov
(South Korea) Jang Eun-a	0
(United States) Virginia Fuchs	5
19 Nov
(North Korea) Pang Chol-mi	5
(Thailand) Jutamas Jitpong	0
19 Nov
(India) Pinki Rani	5
(England) Ebonie Jones	0

Quarterfinals
20 Nov
(Brazil) Grazieli de Sousa	0
(Japan) Tsukimi Namiki	5
20 Nov
(Kazakhstan) Zhaina Shekerbekova	5
(Poland) Sandra Drabik	0
20 Nov
(China) Chang Yuan	0
(United States) Virginia Fuchs	5
20 Nov
(North Korea) Pang Chol-mi	5
(India) Pinki Rani	0

Semifinals
23 Nov
(Japan) Tsukimi Namiki	0
(Kazakhstan) Zhaina Shekerbekova	5
23 Nov
(United States) Virginia Fuchs	0
(North Korea) Pang Chol-mi	5

Final
24 Nov
(Kazakhstan) Zhaina Shekerbekova	0
(North Korea) Pang Chol-mi	5
