= 2022 IBA Women's World Boxing Championships – Flyweight =

Flyweight at the 2022 IBA Women's World Boxing Championships
- Venue: Başakşehir Youth and Sports Facility
- Location: Istanbul, Turkey
- Dates: 11–19 May
- Competitors: 28 from 28 nations

Medalists
gold medal	Nikhat Zareen	India
silver medal	Jutamas Jitpong	Thailand
bronze medal	Zhaina Shekerbekova	Kazakhstan
bronze medal	Caroline de Almeida	Brazil

The Flyweight competition at the 2022 IBA Women's World Boxing Championships was held from 11 to 19 May 2022.

== Results ==
=== Finals ===
Semi-finals
(Kazakhstan) Zhaina Shekerbekova	1
(Thailand) Jutamas Jitpong	4
(Brazil) Caroline de Almeida	0
(India) Nikhat Zareen	5

Final
(Thailand) Jutamas Jitpong	0
(India) Nikhat Zareen	5

=== Top half ===
==== Section 1 ====
Round of 32
(South Korea) Kim Chea-won	0
(Italy) Olena Savchuk	5
(Kazakhstan) Zhaina Shekerbekova	5
(Puerto Rico) Melody Vargas	0
(Nepal) Minu Gurung	0
(Japan) Rinka Kinoshita	5

Round of 16
(Germany) Cathy Sartorius	0
(Italy) Olena Savchuk	5
(Kazakhstan) Zhaina Shekerbekova	3
(Japan) Rinka Kinoshita	2

Quarterfinals
(Italy) Olena Savchuk	0
(Kazakhstan) Zhaina Shekerbekova	4

==== Section 2 ====
Round of 32
(Spain) María González	0
(Australia) Alana Portelli	5
(Kyrgyzstan) Shakhriza Khalilova	0
(Thailand) Jutamas Jitpong	5
(Kenya) Ann Wanjiru	0
(Ukraine) Tetyana Kob	5

Round of 16
(Australia) Alana Portelli	0
(Thailand) Jutamas Jitpong	5
(Ukraine) Tetyana Kob	0
(Uzbekistan) Tursunoy Rakhimova	5

Quarterfinals
(Thailand) Jutamas Jitpong	3
(Uzbekistan) Tursunoy Rakhimova	2

=== Bottom half ===
==== Section 3 ====
Round of 32
(Burundi) Ornella Havyarimana	0
(Republic of Ireland) Carly McNaul	5
Angelina Lukas	0
(Brazil) Caroline de Almeida	5
(Turkey) Beyza Saraçoğlu	5
(Dominican Republic) Miguelina Hernández	0

Round of 16
(Croatia) Nikolina Ćaćić	0
(Republic of Ireland) Carly McNaul	4
(Brazil) Caroline de Almeida	5
(Turkey) Beyza Saraçoğlu	0

Quarterfinals
(Republic of Ireland) Carly McNaul	0
(Brazil) Caroline de Almeida	5

==== Section 4 ====
Round of 32
(Mongolia) Lutsaikhany Altantsetseg	5
(Haiti) Kathreen Sterling	0
(India) Nikhat Zareen	5
(Mexico) Fátima Herrera	0
(England) Charley Davison	5
(Hungary) Beáta Dudek	0

Round of 16
(Mongolia) Lutsaikhany Altantsetseg	0
(India) Nikhat Zareen	5
(England) Charley Davison	RSC
(Tonga) Hainite Tuitupou

Quarterfinals
(India) Nikhat Zareen	5
(England) Charley Davison	0
