= 2014 AIBA Women's World Boxing Championships – Flyweight =

Boxing competitions

The Flyweight (51 kg) competition at the 2014 AIBA Women's World Boxing Championships was held from 17–24 November 2014.

== Medalists ==
Gold	Marlen Esparza (USA)
Silver	Lisa Whiteside (ENG)
Bronze	Terry Gordini (ITA)
Bronze	Clelia Marques (BRA)

== Draw ==
=== Top half ===
First Round
(Belarus) Yana Burym	0
(England) Lisa Whiteside	3
(Azerbaijan) Anakhanim Aghayeva	0
(Thailand) Sopida Satumrum	3
(South Korea) Kim Ye-ji	0
(Canada) Mandy Bujold	3
(Mexico) Araceli Nava	0
(Chinese Taipei) Lin Yu-ting	3
(Argentina) Clara Lescurat	0
(Poland) Ewelina Wicherska	3
(Bulgaria) Stoyka Petrova	3
(Norway) Camilla Johansen	0
(Japan) Tomoko Kugimiya	3
(New Zealand) Sunita Lallu	0
(Philippines) Irish Magno	0
(Italy) Terry Gordini	3

Second Round
(England) Lisa Whiteside	2
(Thailand) Sopida Satumrum	0
(Canada) Mandy Bujold	2
(Chinese Taipei) Lin Yu-ting	1
(Poland) Ewelina Wicherska	0
(Bulgaria) Stoyka Petrova	2
(Japan) Tomoko Kugimiya	0
(Italy) Terry Gordini	3

Quarterfinals
(England) Lisa Whiteside	2
(Canada) Mandy Bujold	0
(Bulgaria) Stoyka Petrova	0
(Italy) Terry Gordini	3

Semifinals
(England) Lisa Whiteside	3
(Italy) Terry Gordini	0

=== Bottom half ===
First Round
(Turkey) Elif Nur Coşkun	3
(Hungary) Katalin Ancsin	0
(Algeria) Roumaysa Boualam	0
(Ukraine) Tetyana Kob	3
(Kazakhstan) Merjen Ishanguliyeva	3
(Romania) Melinda Pantiș	0
(Mongolia) Myagmardulamyn Nandintsetseg	0
(United States) Marlen Esparza	2
(Germany) Ornella Wahner	1
(Russia) Saiana Sagataeva	2
(China) Si Haijuan	0
(India) Pinki Rani	3
(Australia) Kristy Harris	3
(Sri Lanka) Dulani Jayasinghe	0
(Brazil) Clelia Marques	3
(France) Sarah Ourahmoune	0

Second Round
(Turkey) Elif Nur Coşkun	2
(Ukraine) Tetyana Kob	1
(Kazakhstan) Merjen Ishanguliyeva	0
(United States) Marlen Esparza	3
(Russia) Saiana Sagataeva	2
(India) Pinki Rani	1
(Australia) Kristy Harris	0
(Brazil) Clelia Marques	3

Quarterfinals
(Turkey) Elif Nur Coşkun	0
(United States) Marlen Esparza	2
(Russia) Saiana Sagataeva	1
(Brazil) Clelia Marques	2

Semifinals
(United States) Marlen Esparza	3
(Brazil) Clelia Marques	0

=== Final ===
Final
(England) Lisa Whiteside	1
(United States) Marlen Esparza	2
