= Ebonie Jones =

English boxer (born 1998)

Personal information
- Born: 11 May 1998 (age 28) Portsmouth, Hampshire, England
- Weight: Featherweight, Super-bantamweight

Boxing career
- Stance: Orthodox

Boxing record
- Total fights: 7
- Wins: 6
- Win by KO: 0
- Draws: 1
Medal record
Women's amateur boxing
Representing England
European Under-22 Boxing Championships
Gold medal – first place	2018 Târgu Jiu	54kg

Ebonie Jones (born 11 May 1998) is an English former professional boxer who held the Commonwealth Silver female featherweight title. As an amateur she won the gold medal in the 54 kg category at the 2018 European Under-22 Boxing Championships.

== Career ==
Originally a kickboxer, Jones started boxing aged 12. She won the gold medal in the 54 kg division at the 2018 European U22 Boxing Championships in Târgu Jiu, Romania, defeating Poland's Anna Goralska by unanimous decision in the final.

Dropping down a weight category to 51 kg, she was selected for the 2018 AIBA Women's World Championships in New Delhi, India. Jones registered unanimous decision wins over Ainun Azizah from Indonesia and Spanish boxer Andrea Lasheras, before losing to the host nation's Pinki Rani in the round-of-16.

With an amateur record of 60 wins from 65 fights, she quit boxing in 2019 due to difficulties with making the required weight to compete in an Olympic division as well as personal problems.

Jones returned to the sport in 2021 and turned professional, making her pro-debut at Wembley Arena on 2 October that year, with a six-round points win against Vaida Masiokaite.

Unbeaten in her first six fights in the paid ranks, she faced Consolata Musanga for the vacant Commonwealth Silver female featherweight title at South Parade Pier in Southsea, Portsmouth, on 28 September 2024. Jones won the contest via unanimous decision.

She was scheduled to challenge British and Commonwealth female super-bantamweight champion Tysie Gallagher at Canon Medical Arena in Sheffield on 7 February 2025, but the fight was postponed following the death of Gallagher's partner's mother in an incident for which a man was charged with murder. It was rescheduled to take place at the Eco-Power Stadium in Doncaster on 23 May 2025, but was cancelled when Jones failed to make the required weight.

Having not fought competitively again, Jones announced her retirement from professional boxing on 1 November 2025. In a social media post she said it had been a "very hard decision to make but I know it’s the right one" while in a subsequent interview with BBC South Today she added that "intense training" and "extreme dieting from a young age" had taken its toll on her "physically and mentally" and she now wanted to live a "normal life."

== Personal life ==
Jones joined the British Army when she was 17. She served in the Royal Engineers until 2021 when she left to pursue boxing full-time. In 2022, Jones was featured in an episode of the BBC One documentary series, We Are England.

== Professional boxing record ==
7 fights	6 wins	0 losses
By decision	6	0
Draws	1	

No.	Result	Record	Opponent	Type	Round, time	Date	Location	Notes
7	Win	6–0–1	Consolata Musanga	UD	10	28 Sep 2024	South Parade Pier, Southsea, Portsmouth, England	Won vacant Commonwealth Silver female featherweight title
6	Win	5–0–1	Jamillette Janitza Vallejos	PTS	8	29 Jun 2024	Magna Centre, Rotherham, England	
5	Win	4–0–1	Wendellin Cruz	PTS	6	8 Jul 2023	Mountbatten Centre, Portsmouth, England	
4	Win	3–0–1	Jasmina Nad	PTS	6	15 Oct 2022	The O2 Arena, London, England	
3	Win	2–0–1	Bec Connolly	PTS	6	11 Jun 2022	Wembley Arena, London, England	
2	Draw	1–0–1	Eftychia Kathopouli	PTS	6	22 Feb 2022	SSE Hydro, Glasgow, Scotland	
1	Win	1–0	Vaida Masiokaite	PTS	6	2 Oct 2021	Wembley Arena, London, England	
