= Boxing at the 2016 Summer Olympics – Women's flyweight =

Boxing competitions

Women's flyweight boxing at the Games of the XXXI Olympiad
- Venue: Riocentro – Pavilion 6
- Date: 12–20 August 2016
- Competitors: 12 from 12 nations

Medalists
1st place, gold medalist(s)		Nicola Adams	Great Britain
2nd place, silver medalist(s)		Sarah Ourahmoune	France
3rd place, bronze medalist(s)		Ren Cancan	China
3rd place, bronze medalist(s)		Ingrit Valencia	Colombia

The women's flyweight boxing competition at the 2016 Olympic Games in Rio de Janeiro was held from 12 to 20 August at the Riocentro. It featured 12 boxers from as many nations.

== Schedule ==
All times are Brasília Time (UTC−3).

Date	Time	Round
Friday, 12 August 2016	11:00	Round of 16
Tuesday, 16 August 2016	11:00	Quarter-finals
Thursday, 18 August 2016	14:00	Semi-finals
Saturday, 20 August 2016	14:00	Final

== Results ==
Round of 16
Tetyana Kob (UKR)	2
Stanimira Petrova (BUL)	1
Yodgoroy Mirzaeva (UZB)	0
Mandy Bujold (CAN)	3
Ingrit Valencia (COL)	TKO
Judith Mbougnade (CAF)
Zohra Ez-Zahraoui (MAR)	0
Sarah Ourahmoune (FRA)	3

Quarter-finals
Nicola Adams (GBR)	3
Tetyana Kob (UKR)	0
Mandy Bujold (CAN)	0
Ren Cancan (CHN)	3
Peamwilai Laopeam (THA)	0
Ingrit Valencia (COL)	3
Sarah Ourahmoune (FRA)	3
Zhaina Shekerbekova (KAZ)	0

Semi-finals
Nicola Adams (GBR)	3
Ren Cancan (CHN)	0
Ingrit Valencia (COL)	0
Sarah Ourahmoune (FRA)	2

Final
Nicola Adams (GBR)	3
Sarah Ourahmoune (FRA)	0
