= Boxing at the 2015 European Games – Women's 51 kg =

Boxing competitions

Women's flyweight boxing at the 2015 European Games
- Venue: Baku Crystal Hall
- Date: 19–25 June
- Competitors: 15 from 15 nations

Medalists
gold medal	Nicola Adams	Great Britain
silver medal	Sandra Drabik	Poland
bronze medal	Elif Coşkun	Turkey
bronze medal	Saiana Sagataeva	Russia

The women's flyweight 51 kg boxing event at the 2015 European Games in Baku was held from 19 to 25 June at the Baku Crystal Hall.

== Results ==
Round of 16; 19 June
Elif Coşkun (TUR)	2
Tetyana Kob (UKR)	1
Wassila Lkhadiri (FRA)	0
Stoyka Petrova (BUL)	3
Nicola Adams (GBR)	3
Katalin Ancsin (HUN)	0
Anakhanim Aghayeva (AZE)	0
Sandra Drabik (POL)	3
Melinda Pantiş (ROU)	0
Yana Burym (BLR)	3
Terry Gordini (ITA)	1
Saiana Sagataeva (RUS)	2
Camilla Johansen (NOR)	0
Ceire Smith (IRL)	3

Quarterfinals; 22 June
Ornella Wahner (GER)	0
Elif Coşkun (TUR)	3
Stoyka Petrova (BUL)	0
Nicola Adams (GBR)	2
Sandra Drabik (POL)	2
Yana Burym (BLR)	0
Saiana Sagataeva (RUS)	2
Ceire Smith (IRL)	1

Semifinals; 24 June
Elif Coşkun (TUR)	0
Nicola Adams (GBR)	3
Sandra Drabik (POL)	3
Saiana Sagataeva (RUS)	0

Final; 25 June
Nicola Adams (GBR)	2
Sandra Drabik (POL)	0
