= Boxing at the 2018 Commonwealth Games – Women's flyweight =

Boxing competitions

Boxing – Women's flyweight at the 2018 Commonwealth Games
- Venue: Oxenford Studios
- Dates: 11 – 14 April 2018
- Competitors: 7 from 7 nations

Medalists
| gold medal | Lisa Whiteside | England |
| silver medal | Carly McNaul | Northern Ireland |
| bronze medal | Taylah Robertson | Australia |
| bronze medal | Christine Ongare | Kenya |

The women's flyweight boxing competitions at the 2018 Commonwealth Games in Gold Coast, Australia took place between 11 and 14 April at Oxenford Studios. Women flyweights were limited to those boxers weighing less than 51 kilograms.

Like all Commonwealth boxing events, the competition was a straight single-elimination tournament. Both semifinal losers were awarded bronze medals, so no boxers competed again after their first loss. Bouts consisted of three rounds of three minutes each, with one-minute breaks between rounds. Beginning this year, the competition was scored using the "must-ten" scoring system.

Taylah Robertson of Australia was guaranteed to win a medal, before the event started, after she received a bye to the semi-finals, guaranteeing her at least a bronze.

== Schedule ==
The schedule is as follows:

All times are Australian Eastern Standard Time (UTC+10)

| Date | Time | Round |
|---|---|---|
| Wednesday 11 April 2018 | 20:32 | Quarter-finals |
| Friday 13 April 2018 | 14:32 | Semi-finals |
| Saturday 14 April 2018 | 13:32 | Final |

== Results ==
The draw is as follows:

Quarterfinals
Lisa Whiteside (ENG) | 3
Pinki Rani (IND) | 2
Ayisat Oriyomi (NGR)
Carly McNaul (NIR) | ABD
Dulani Jayasinghe (SRI)
Christine Ongare (KEN) | RSC

Semifinals
Taylah Robertson (AUS) | 2
Lisa Whiteside (ENG) | 3
Carly McNaul (NIR) | 5
Christine Ongare (KEN) | 0

Final
Lisa Whiteside (ENG) | 5
Carly McNaul (NIR) | 0
