= Taylah Robertson =

Australian boxer (born 1998)

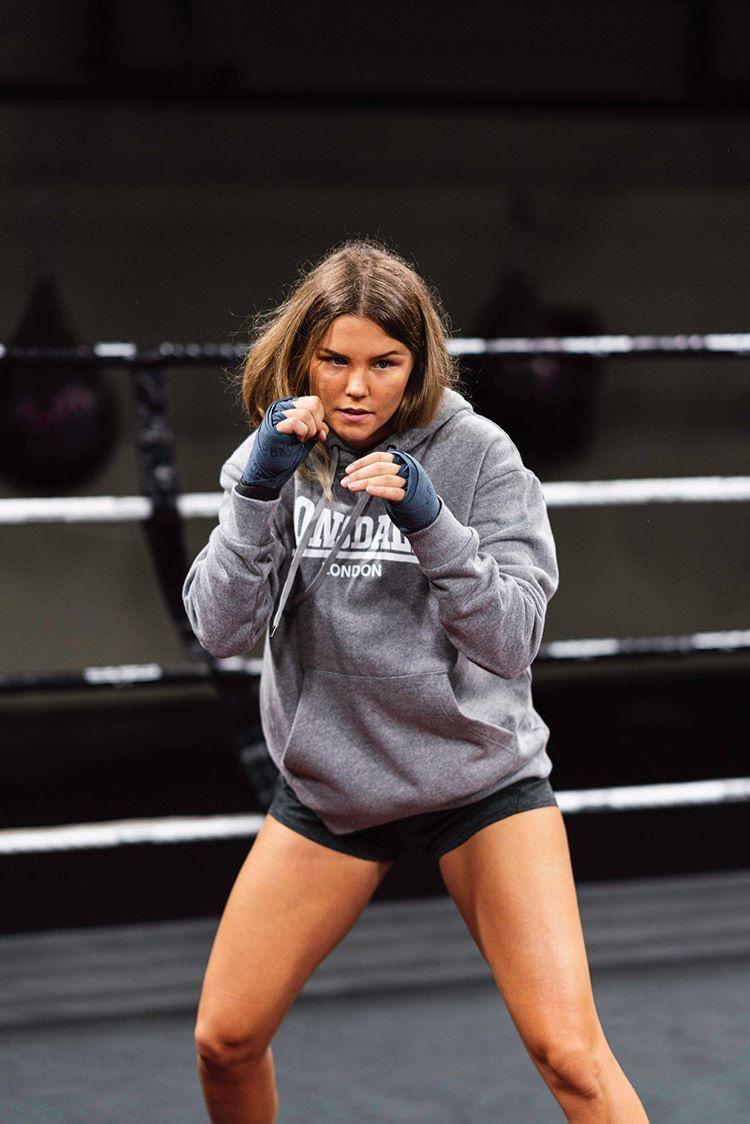

Personal information
- Nationality: Australian
- Born: 23 April 1998 (age 28) Townsville, Australia
- Height: 164 cm (5 ft 4 1/2 in)
- Weight: Flyweight

Boxing career

Boxing record
- Total fights: 2
- Wins: 2
- Win by KO: 1
- Losses: 1
Medal record
Women's amateur boxing
Representing Australia
Commonwealth Games
Bronze medal – third place	2018 Gold Coast	Flyweight
Australian National Championships
Gold medal – first place	2017 NSW	Flyweight
Gold medal – first place	2018 Brisbane	Flyweight
Gold medal – first place	2019 Melbourne	Flyweight

Taylah Robertson (born 23 April 1998) is an Australian professional boxer. As an amateur she won a bronze medal at the 2018 Commonwealth Games.

== Early life ==
Taylah Robertson was born in Townsville, Australia, in 1998. Shortly after she moved to Brisbane where she attended early primary school. She then moved to Bribie Island to finish her schooling through to year 12 at St Columban's College, Caboolture. She finished her high school graduation certificate and completed her cert 3 and 4 in fitness.

== Amateur career ==
Robertson started boxing at the age of 12 and won her first Australian title as a junior at 15 in Perth, Western Australia. She went on to win more Australian national titles and eventually joined the National Team of Australia, competing internationally over four years, winning a bronze medal at the 2018 Commonwealth Games and participating in the 2019 World Championships.

== Professional career ==
In late 2019 Robertson signed a professional contract with MTK Global. In early February she had her first professional fight in the Sleeman Centre, Brisbane at bantamweight, winning in under 56 seconds by technical knockout (TKO).

Before the COVID-19 pandemic, she went to the US to train in West Hollywood, California, at Justin Fortune's gym. Her trip was cut short by the COVID-19 lockdown and she returned to Australia.

== Other activities ==
Robertson appeared in series 2 of Hunted with Glenn Azar. The show was filmed in and around Melbourne.

== Professional boxing record ==
1 fight	1 win	0 losses
By knockout	1	0

No.	Result	Record	Opponent	Type	Round, time	Date	Location	Notes
1	Win	1–0	(Thailand) Ranee Klinratree	TKO	1 (6), 0:56	22 Feb 2020	Saleem Sports Complex, Brisbane, Australia	

== Appearances and honours ==
- 5 × Australian champion
- Commonwealth games bronze medallist
- World championship representative (Russia)
- Kalpori cup 2018 bronze medal (Indonesia)
- Boxer Cup 2018/2019 Silver and Gold medalist (Spain)
- Ahmet Cup Silver medallist (Turkey)
- 5 × state champion
- 2 × Golden Glove champion
