= Jennifer Lozano =

American boxer (born 2002)

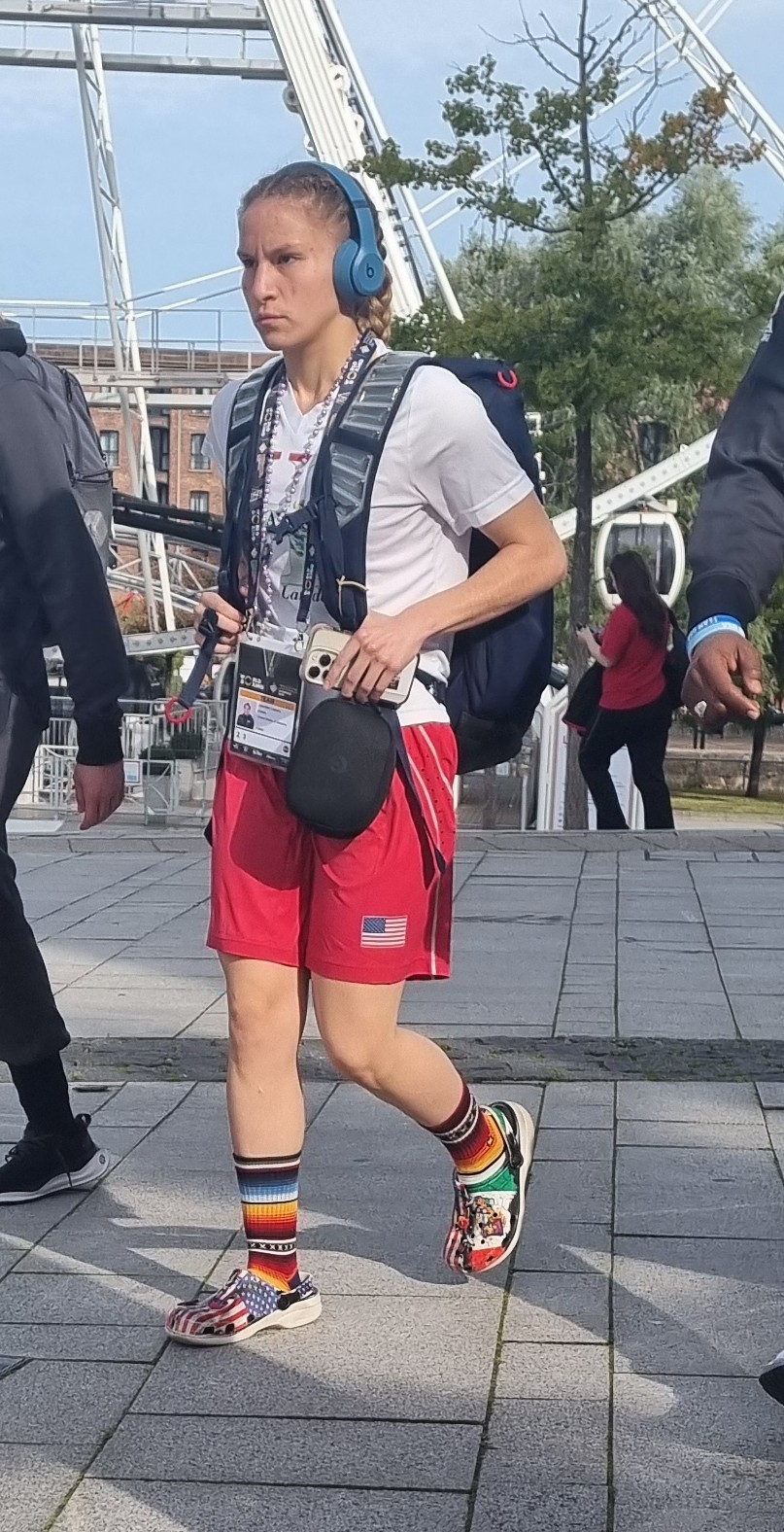
- Lozano in 2025

Personal information
- Nationality: American
- Born: November 24, 2002 (age 23) Laredo, Texas, U.S.
- Height: 5 ft 2 in (157 cm)

Boxing career
Medal record
Women's amateur boxing
Representing United States
Pan American Games
Silver medal – second place	2023 Santiago	Women's 50 kg

Jennifer Lozano (/loʊˈsɑːnoʊ/ loh-SAH-noh; born November 24, 2002) is an American boxer. She won the silver medal at the 2023 Pan American Games in the women's 50 kg category.
