= Boxing at the 2019 Pan American Games – Women's 51 kg =

Women's Flyweight at the 2019 Pan American Games
- Venue: Miguel Grau Coliseum
- Dates: July 28 – August 2, 2019
- Competitors: 8 from 8 nations

Medalists
Gold medal	Ingrit Valencia; Colombia
Silver medal	Virginia Fuchs; United States
Bronze medal	Irismar Cardozo; Venezuela
Bronze medal	Miguelina Hernández; Dominican Republic

The Women's flyweight competition of the boxing events at the 2019 Pan American Games in Lima, Peru, was held between the 28 of July and the 2 of August 2019 at the Miguel Grau Coliseum.

Like all Pan American boxing events, the competition is a straight single-elimination tournament. Both semifinal losers are awarded bronze medals, so no boxers compete again after their first loss. Bouts consist of a 3 rounds "10-point must" scoring system used in the pro game, where the winner of each round must be awarded 10 points and the loser a lesser amount, and the elimination of the padded headgear. Five judges scored each bout. The winner will be the boxer who scored the most at the end of the match.

== Results ==
=== Bracket ===
Quarterfinals; July 28, 2019
Virginia Fuchs (USA)	5
Valeria Cárdenas (CRC)	0
Cynthia Madrid (ESA)	0
Irismar Cardozo (VEN)	5
Katy Esquivel (NCA)	1
Miguelina Hernández (DOM)	4
Lucy Valdivia (PER)	2
Ingrit Valencia (COL)	3

Semifinals; July 30, 2019
Virginia Fuchs (USA)	5
Irismar Cardozo (VEN)	0
Miguelina Hernández (DOM)	0
Ingrit Valencia (COL)	5

Final; August 2, 2019
Virginia Fuchs (USA)	1
Ingrit Valencia (COL)	4
