= Sonia Osorio (boxer) =

Mexican boxer (born 1992)

Personal information
- Born: Sonia Osorio Vázquez; 21 October 1992 (age 33) Iztapalapa, Mexico
- Height: 5 ft 1 in (155 cm)
- Weight: Flyweight; Super flyweight

Boxing career
- Stance: Orthodox

Boxing record
- Total fights: 26
- Wins: 15
- Win by KO: 4
- Losses: 9
- Draws: 2

Sonia Osorio Vázquez (born 21 October 1992) is a Mexican professional boxer who held the WBC interim female super flyweight title from 25 October 2019 to 8 September 2022.

== Professional career ==
Osorio made her professional debut on 11 May 2013, winning via third-round technical knockout (TKO) in a scheduled six-round bout against Patricia de Los Santos Garcia (4–10, 2 KOs) at the Sindicato de Taxistas in Cancún, Mexico.

After compiling a record of 9–2–1 (1 KO), she faced Isabel Millan (17–2–1, 8 KOs) for the WBF female flyweight title on 9 December 2016, at the Gimnasio Nuevo León Unido in Monterrey, Mexico. Osorio was disqualified in the tenth and final round for repeated head butts, receiving a warning in the fifth round followed by a point deduction in the eighth before the fight was waved off. After losing three of her next four fights, she fought Maria Goreti (4–7) for the vacant Mexican female flyweight title on 23 June 2018 at the Salón Villa Flamingos in Mexico City. Osorio defeated Goreti to capture her first professional title by unanimous decision (UD), with all three judges scoring the bout 97–93.

She won two of her next three fights before facing Estrella Valverde (18–5–2, 3 KOs) for the vacant WBC interim female super flyweight title on 25 October 2019 at the Salon Riverside in Texcoco de Mora, Mexico. Osorio won the fight via UD, with two judges scoring the bout 99–91 and the third scoring it 98–92. Osorio lost her title to Adelaida Ruiz going down to a unanimous decision defeat in their contest on 8 September 2022.

== Professional boxing record ==
| 26 fights | 15 wins | 9 losses |
|---|---|---|
| By knockout | 4 | 0 |
| By decision | 11 | 8 |
| By disqualification | 0 | 1 |
| Draws | 2 | |

| No. | Result | Record | Opponent | Type | Round, time | Date | Location | Notes |
|---|---|---|---|---|---|---|---|---|
| 26 | Loss | 15–9–2 | Tania Garcia Hernandez | UD | 8 | 29 July 2023 | Mexico City, Mexico | |
| 25 | Loss | 15–8–2 | Adelaida Ruiz | UD | 10 | 8 Sep 2022 | Cuidad Deportiva Heiner Ugalde, Hatillo, San José, Costa Rica | Lost WBC interim super-flyweight title |
| 24 | Loss | 15–7–2 | Angela Nolasco | UD | 8 | 16 Oct 2021 | Salon Marbet Plus, Ciudad Nezahualcóyotl, Mexico | |
| 23 | Draw | 15–6–2 | Adelaida Ruiz | TD | 2 (10), 2:00 | 20 Mar 2021 | Krystal Grand Hotel, Nuevo Vallarta, Mexico | Retained WBC interim super-flyweight title; TD: Osorio cut from accidental head clash |
| 22 | Win | 15–6–1 | Estrella Valverde | UD | 10 | 25 Oct 2019 | Salon Riverside, Texcoco de Mora, Mexico | Won vacant WBC interim super-flyweight title |
| 21 | Loss | 14–6–1 | Marlen Esparza | UD | 8 | 18 Jul 2019 | Fantasy Springs Resort Casino, Indio, California, U.S. | |
| 20 | Win | 14–5–1 | Maria Jose Monroy | KO | 1 (4), 1:38 | 2 Feb 2019 | Gimnasio Bobby Rodriguez Sporta, Guatemala City, Guatemala | |
| 19 | Win | 13–5–1 | Maria Morales | TKO | 5 (8), 1:58 | 14 Sep 2018 | Salón Cristal, Chalco de Díaz Covarrubias, Mexico | |
| 18 | Win | 12–5–1 | Maria Goreti | UD | 10 | 23 Jun 2018 | Salón Villa Flamingos, Mexico City, Mexico | Won vacant Mexican flyweight title |
| 17 | Loss | 11–5–1 | Seniesa Estrada | UD | 8 | 16 Mar 2018 | Belasco Theatre, Los Angeles, California, U.S. | |
| 16 | Win | 11–4–1 | Noemi Bosques | UD | 4 | 7 Jul 2017 | A La Carte Event Pavilion, Tampa, Florida, U.S. | |
| 15 | Loss | 10–4–1 | Cristina Fuentes | SD | 6 | 22 Apr 2017 | Pharr Events Center, Pharr, Texas, U.S. | |
| 14 | Loss | 10–3–1 | Jazmin Gonzalez | UD | 6 | 1 Apr 2017 | Zócalo, Mexico City, Mexico | |
| 13 | Loss | 10–2–1 | Isabel Millan | DQ | 10 (10) | 9 Dec 2016 | Gimnasio Nuevo León Unido, Monterrey, Mexico | For WBF flyweight title; Osorio disqualified for repeated head butts |
| 12 | Draw | 10–1–1 | Elizabeth Corzo | MD | 8 | 9 Sep 2016 | Arena Cancún, Cancún, Mexico | |
| 11 | Win | 10–1 | Leticia Uribe | PTS | 4 | 16 Jul 2016 | Centro de Espectáculos del Recinto Ferial, Metepec, Mexico | |
| 10 | Win | 9–1 | Veronica Ixehuatl | PTS | ? | 14 May 2016 | Arena Coliseo, Mexico City, Mexico | |
| 9 | Win | 8–1 | Adriana Reza | UD | 4 | 2 Apr 2016 | Centro de Convenciones, Tlalnepantla de Baz, Mexico | |
| 8 | Win | 7–1 | Edith de Jesus Flores | UD | ? | 5 Mar 2016 | Centro Regional de Deporte de Las Américas, Ecatepec de Morelos, Mexico | |
| 7 | Win | 6–1 | Veronica Ixehuatl | SD | 4 | 24 Oct 2015 | Deportivo Morelos Pavon, Mexico City, Mexico | |
| 6 | Loss | 5–1 | Jessica Martínez Castillo | MD | 4 | 19 Jun 2014 | Jose Cuervo Salon, Mexico City, Mexico | Cinturón de Oro XX – Semifinal |
| 5 | Win | 5–0 | Maria Goreti | SD | 4 | 24 Apr 2014 | Jose Cuervo Salon, Mexico City, Mexico | Cinturón de Oro XX – Quarterfinal |
| 4 | Win | 4–0 | Karla Zarate | UD | 4 | 22 Feb 2014 | Gimnasio Miguel Hidalgo, Puebla, Mexico | |
| 3 | Win | 3–0 | Blanca Diaz | TKO | 1 (6), 0:25 | 13 Sep 2013 | Sindicato de Taxistas, Cancún, Mexico | |
| 2 | Win | 2–0 | Jazmin Ortega | UD | 4 | 13 Jul 2013 | Centro de Espectáculos de la Feria de León, León, Mexico | |
| 1 | Win | 1–0 | Patricia Garcia | TKO | 3 (6), 1:02 | 11 May 2013 | Sindicato de Taxistas, Cancún, Mexico | |

== See also ==
- List of female boxers

Sporting positions
Regional boxing titles
| Vacant Title last held by Maribel Ramírez | Mexican flyweight champion June 23, 2018 – October 25, 2019; Won interim title | Vacant Title next held by Graciela Cortes Aguilar |
World boxing titles
| Vacant Title last held by Usanakorn Thawilsuhannawang | WBC super-flyweight champion Interim title October 25, 2019 – September 8, 2022 | Succeeded by Adelaida Ruiz |
