= Zhaina Shekerbekova =

Kazakhstani boxer (born 1989)

Personal information
- Nationality: Kazakh
- Born: 17 December 1989 (age 36) Shardara, Kazakh SSR, Soviet Union

Sport
- Sport: Boxing
Medal record
Women's amateur boxing
Representing Kazakhstan
World Championships
Silver medal – second place	2018 New Delhi	Flyweight
Bronze medal – third place	2016 Astana	Flyweight
Bronze medal – third place	2022 Istanbul	Flyweight
Asian Games
Silver medal – second place	2014 Incheon	Flyweight
Asian Championships
Gold medal – first place	2010 Astana	Welterweight
Gold medal – first place	2022 Amman	Bantamweight

Zhaina Shekerbekova (born 17 December 1989) is a Kazakh female boxer.

She represented Kazakhstan at the 2016 Summer Olympics in Rio de Janeiro, in the women's flyweight.

She won a silver medal at the 2014 Asian Games, and a bronze medal at the 2016 AIBA Women's World Boxing Championships.
