= Boxing at the 2014 Commonwealth Games – Women's flyweight =

Boxing competitions

Boxing – Women's flyweight at the 2014 Commonwealth Games
- Venue: Scottish Exhibition and Conference Centre
- Dates: July 28 – August 2
- Competitors: 11 from 11 nations

Medalists
gold medal	Nicola Adams	England
silver medal	Michaela Walsh	Northern Ireland
bronze medal	Mandy Bujold	Canada
bronze medal	Pinki Rani	India

The Women's flyweight boxing competition at the 2014 Commonwealth Games in Glasgow, Scotland took place between July 28 and August 2 at the Scottish Exhibition and Conference Centre. For the first time ever women's boxing will be contested.

Like all Commonwealth boxing events, the competition was a straight single-elimination tournament. Both semifinal losers were awarded bronze medals, so no boxers competed again after their first loss. Bouts consisted of four rounds of two minutes each, with one-minute breaks between rounds. Punches scored only if the front of the glove made full contact with the front of the head or torso of the opponent. Three judges scored each bout; The winner of the bout was the boxer who won the most rounds.

== Medalists ==
Gold	Nicola Adams; England
Silver	Michaela Walsh; Northern Ireland
Bronze	Pinki Rani; India
Bronze	Mandy Bujold; Canada

== Results ==
All times are British Summer Time (UTC+1)

Round of 16; Monday 28 July 2014; 18:30
Michaela Walsh (NIR)	3
Thessa Dumas (MRI)	0
Christine Ongare (KEN)	0
Kristy Harris (AUS)	3
Oluwatoyin Oladeji (NGR)	0
Nicola Adams (ENG)	3

Quarter-finals; Wednesday 30 July 2014; 13:40
Sarah Joy Rae (JAM)	0
Michaela Walsh (NIR)	3
Pinki Rani (IND)	3
Jacquiline Wangi (PNG)	0
Mandy Bujold (CAN)	3
Kristy Harris (AUS)	0
Nicola Adams (ENG)	3
Erandi de Silva (SRI)	0

Semi-finals; Friday 1 August 2014; 13:50
Michaela Walsh (NIR)	2
Pinki Rani (IND)	0
Mandy Bujold (CAN)	0
Nicola Adams (ENG)	3

Final; Saturday 2 August 2014; 14:25
Michaela Walsh (NIR)	0
Nicola Adams (ENG)	1
