= Adelaida Ruiz =

American boxer (born 1988)

Personal information
- Nickname: La Cobra (The Cobra)
- Born: Adelaida María Ruiz; October 17, 1988 (age 37) Los Angeles, California, U.S.
- Height: 5 ft 4 in (163 cm)
- Weight: Super flyweight

Boxing career
- Stance: Orthodox

Boxing record
- Total fights: 21
- Wins: 19
- Win by KO: 8
- Losses: 1
- Draws: 1

Adelaida Maria Ruiz (born October 17, 1988) is an American professional boxer who has held WBC female super-flyweight title since November 2025.

== Professional career ==
Ruiz made her professional debut on April 21, 2017, scoring a four-round unanimous decision (UD) victory against Rebecca Light at the Quiet Cannon in Montebello, California.

After compiling a record of 9–0 (4 KOs), she faced reigning champion Sonia Osorio for the WBC female interim super flyweight title on March 20, 2021, at the Krystal Grand Hotel in Nuevo Vallarta, Mexico. Following an accidental clash of heads in the first round, the referee called a halt to the contest on advice from the ringside doctor at the end of round two, resulting in a second-round technical draw.

In her next fight she faced Nancy Franco for the vacant WBC Silver female super flyweight title on September 25 at the Sports Arena in Pico Rivera, California. After unleashing a barrage of punches, referee Raul Caiz Jr. stepped in to call a halt to the contest at 1 minute and 20 seconds of the ninth round.

Ruiz won the interim WBC female super-flyweight World title with a unanimous decision win over Sonia Osorio on 8 September 2022.

She lost her title, and unbeaten record, to Ginny Fuchs by split decision at Dignity Health Sports Park, Carson, California, on 31 August 2024, with one judge scoring the fight 97-93 in her favour but the other two having it for Fuchs 97-93 and 100-90 respectively.

Despite this loss, when injury meant Asley González was forced to vacate the WBC female super-flyweight title, Ruiz was given the chance to face Alexas Kubicki for the vacant championship at Save Mart Center in Fresno, California, USA, on November 29, 2025. She won by unanimous decision.

Ruiz made the first defense of her title against Ginny Fuchs in a rematch of their contest from 2024 at the NOS Event Center in San Bernardino, California, on 18 July 2026. This time she emerged as the winner by unanimous decision.

== Professional boxing record ==
21 fights	19 wins	1 loss
By knockout	8	0
By decision	11	1
Draws	1	

No.	Result	Record	Opponent	Type	Round, time	Date	Location	Notes
21	Win	19–1–1	Virginia Fuchs	UD	10	Jul 18, 2026	Orange Show Events Center, San Bernardino, California, U.S.	Retained WBC female super-flyweight title
20	Win	18–1–1	Alexas Kubicki	UD	10	Nov 29, 2025	Save Mart Center, Fresno, California, U.S.	Won vacant WBC female super-flyweight title
19	Win	17–1–1	Luz Elena Aguilar Ventura	UD	8	Jul 5, 2025	Tijuana, Baja California, Mexico	
18	Loss	16–1–1	Virginia Fuchs	SD	10	Aug 31, 2024	Dignity Health Sports Park, Carson, California, U.S.	Lost WBC interim female super-flyweight title
17	Win	16–0–1	Catherine Tacone Ramos	UD	8	Jul 20, 2024	Estadio Ricardo Saprissa Ayma, San Juan de Tibas, Costa Rica	
16	Win	15–0–1	Mayela Perez	UD	8	Dec 9, 2023	Thunder Studios, Long Beach, California, U.S.	
15	Win	14–0–1	María Cecilia Román	KO	8 (8) 1:19	Jun 2, 2023	Pechanga Resort Casino, Temecula, California, U.S.	
14	Win	13–0–1	Maria Esther del Angel Diaz	KO	1 (10) 1:43	Mar 25, 2023	Tepic, Nayarit Mexico	
13	Win	12–0–1	Sonia Osorio	UD	10	Sep 8, 2022	Cuidad Deportiva Heiner Ugalde, Hatillo, San Jose Cost Rica	Won WBC interim female super-flyweight title
12	Win	11–0–1	Edith de Jesus Flores	KO	3 (6), 0:33	Mar 25, 2022	Camara Ganadera de San Carlos, Alajuela, Costa Rica	
11	Win	10–0–1	Nancy Franco	KO	9 (10), 1:20	Sep 25, 2021	Pico Rivera Sports Arena, Pico Rivera, California, U.S.	Won vacant WBC Silver female super-flyweight title
10	Draw	9–0–1	Sonia Osorio	TD	2 (10), 2:00	Mar 20, 2021	Krystal Grand Hotel, Nuevo Vallarta, Mexico	For WBC interim female super-flyweight title; TD: Osorio cut from accidental head clash
9	Win	9–0	Mikayla Nebel	UD	6	Oct 12, 2019	Pico Rivera Sports Arena, Pico Rivera, California, U.S.	
8	Win	8–0	Myrka Aguayo	UD	6	Jun 15, 2019	Pico Rivera Sports Arena, Pico Rivera, California, U.S.	
7	Win	7–0	Jhosep Vizcaíno	TKO	2 (6), 0:59	Nov 3, 2018	Quiet Cannon, Montebello, California, U.S.	
6	Win	6–0	Karla Valenzuela Garcia	KO	4 (6), 1:05	Jun 15, 2018	Pacific Palms Resort, City of Industry, California, U.S.	
5	Win	5–0	Reyna Viridiana Garcia Cotija	KO	4 (6), 1:28	Apr 28, 2018	Westin Bonaventure Hotel, Los Angeles, California, U.S.	
4	Win	4–0	Brenda Enriquez	KO	2 (4), 0:53	Mar 17, 2018	Commerce Casino, Los Angeles, California, U.S.	
3	Win	3–0	Dalia Gomez	UD	4	Nov 25, 2017	Westin Bonaventure Hotel, Los Angeles, California, U.S.	
2	Win	2–0	Haley Pasion	UD	4	Sep 2, 2017	Westin Bonaventure Hotel, Los Angeles, California, U.S.	
1	Win	1–0	Rebecca Light	UD	4	Apr 21, 2017	Quiet Cannon, Montebello, California, U.S.	

== See also ==
- List of female boxers

Sporting positions
Regional boxing titles
Vacant Title last held by Jasseth Noriega	WBC Silver super-flyweight champion September 25, 2021 – September 8, 2022; Won interim title	Vacant Title next held by Carla Merino
World boxing titles
Preceded by Sonia Osorio	WBC super-flyweight champion Interim title September 8, 2022 – August 31, 2024	Succeeded by Virginia Fuchs
Vacant Title last held by Asley González	WBC super-flyweight champion November 29, 2025 – present	Incumbent
