= Boxing at the 2023 Pan American Games – Women's 50 kg =

Women's 50 kg at the 2023 Pan American Games
- Venue: Olympic Training Center
- Start date: October 21, 2023
- End date: October 27, 2023
- Competitors: 15 from 15 nations

Medalists
Gold medal	Caroline de Almeida	Brazil
Silver medal	Jennifer Lozano	United States
Bronze medal	Ingrit Valencia	Colombia
Bronze medal	Mckenzie Wright	Canada

The Women's 50 kg competition of the boxing events at the 2023 Pan American Games in Santiago, Chile, was held between October 21 and 27 at the Olympic Training Center. A total of 15 boxers from 15 NOC's competed.

The two finalists will qualify for the 2024 Summer Olympics in Paris, France.

== Qualification ==
There was a quota of 130 boxers to compete at the games (ten per event). The host nation (Chile) received automatic qualification spots for all events. The remainder of the spots were awarded through various qualifying tournaments. However, the International Olympic Committee later decided the competition was an open registration event, meaning any NOC could enter a boxer into the event.

== Competition format ==
Like all Pan American boxing events, the competition is a straight single-elimination tournament. Both semifinal losers are awarded bronze medals, so no boxers compete again after their first loss. Bouts consist of 3 rounds "10-point must" scoring system used, where the winner of each round must be awarded 10 points and the loser a lesser amount, and the elimination of the padded headgear. Five judges scored each bout. The winner will be the boxer who scored the most at the end of the match.

== Results ==
Round of 16 (October 21)
Ingrid Gómez (MEX)	0
Aldana López (ARG)	5
Yuliett Hinestroza (PAN)	4
Novoanny Núñez (DOM)	1
Caroline de Almeida (BRA)	5
Kathreen Sterling (HAI)	0
Valeria Cárdenas (CRC)	4
Gracemarie Quiles (PUR)	1
Mckenzie Wright (CAN)	3
Aylin Jamez (EAI)	2
Tayonis Cedeño (VEN)	5
Kimberly Sandoval (CHI)	0
Jennifer Lozano (USA)	3
Susan Águas (ECU)	2

Quarterfinals
Ingrit Valencia (COL)	3
Aldana López (ARG)	2
Yuliett Hinestroza (PAN)	0
Caroline de Almeida (BRA)	5
Valeria Cárdenas (CRC)	0
Mckenzie Wright (CAN)	5
Tayonis Cedeño (VEN)	2
Jennifer Lozano (USA)	3

Semifinals
Ingrit Valencia (COL)	1
Caroline de Almeida (BRA)	4
Mckenzie Wright (CAN)	0
Jennifer Lozano (USA)	5

Final
Caroline de Almeida (BRA)	5
Jennifer Lozano (USA)	0
