= Aleksandra Ordina =

Russian boxer

Personal information
- Nationality: Russia
- Born: 15 August 1987 (age 39)

Sport
- Sport: Boxing
Medal record
Gold medal – first place	2016 Sofia	Light Welterweight

Aleksandra Ordina (born 15 August 1987) is a Russian amateur light welterweight boxer and 2016 European boxing champion.
