= 2013 Women's European Union Amateur Boxing Championships =

Boxing competitions

2013 Women's European Union Boxing Championships
- Host city: Keszthely
- Country: Hungary
- Dates: 1–7 July

The 2013 Women's European Union Amateur Boxing Championships were held in Keszthely, Hungary from July 1 to July 7. This was the 7th edition of this competition organised by the European governing body for amateur boxing, the European Boxing Confederation (EUBC).

== Medal winners ==
Event	Gold	Silver	Bronze
48 kg	(Italy) Valeria Calabrese	(Finland) Sonia Grönroos	(Wales) Lynsey Holdaway (Slovenia) Mateja Rajterič
51 kg	(England) Nicola Adams	(Bulgaria) Stoyka Petrova	(Italy) Valeria Calabrese (Poland) Sandra Drabik
54 kg	(England) Lisa Whiteside	(Czech Republic) Alice Šrámková	(France) Delphine Mancini (Turkey) Kübra Ardıç
57 kg	(Italy) Marzia Davide	(Germany) Ornella Wahner	(Finland) Cecilia Nilsson (Poland) Sandra Kruk
60 kg	(Republic of Ireland) Katie Taylor	(France) Estelle Mossely	(England) Natasha Jonas (Finland) Mira Potkonen
64 kg	(Hungary) Bianka Nagy	(Czech Republic) Martina Schmoranzová	(Denmark) Camilla Skov Jensen (Germany) Cindy Rogge
69 kg	(France) Erika Guerrier	(Serbia) Marija Stojanović	(Turkey) Gülizar Kara (Republic of Ireland) Claire Grace
75 kg	(England) Savannah Marshall	(Netherlands) Nouchka Fontijn	(Croatia) Nives Radić (Sweden) Love Holgersson
81 kg	(Hungary) Mária Kovács	(Germany) Sarah Scheurich	(Poland) Wioleta Michalska (Netherlands) Maxime Koelemij
+81 kg	(Turkey) Emine Bozduman	(Republic of Ireland) Lianne Murphy	(Poland) Sylwia Kusiak (Croatia) Danijela Vernić

== Medal count table ==
Rank	Nation	Gold	Silver	Bronze	Total
1	England (ENG)	3	0	1	4
2	Italy (ITA)	2	0	1	3
3	Hungary (HUN)	2	0	0	2
4	France (FRA)	1	1	1	3
4	Ireland (IRL)	1	1	1	3
6	Turkey (TUR)	1	0	2	3
7	Germany (GER)	0	2	1	3
8	Czech Republic (CZE)	0	2	0	2
9	Finland (FIN)	0	1	2	3
10	Netherlands (NED)	0	1	1	2
11	Bulgaria (BUL)	0	1	0	1
11	Serbia (SRB)	0	1	0	1
13	Poland (POL)	0	0	4	4
14	Croatia (CRO)	0	0	2	2
15	Denmark (DEN)	0	0	1	1
15	Slovenia (SLO)	0	0	1	1
15	Sweden (SWE)	0	0	1	1
15	Wales (WAL)	0	0	1	1
Totals (18 entries)		10	10	20	40
