= Érica Matos =

Brazilian boxer (born 1983)

Erica Matos
Personal information
- Nationality: Brazil
- Born: Erica dos Santos Matos; 24 May 1983 (age 43) Salvador, Brazil
- Height: 5 ft 2 in (1.57 m)
- Weight: Flyweight

Boxing career
Medal record
Representing Brazil
Women's boxing
South American Games
Bronze medal – third place	2010 Medellín	Flyweight

Erica dos Santos Matos (born May 24, 1983) in is an amateur Brazilian boxer.

Hailing from Salvador, capital of the state of Bahia, Matos first practiced futsal before a classmate invited her to attend boxing classes with him in 2005. Liking the sport, Matos would decide further dedication to it after winning a national championship in Salvador. She was guided by Luiz Dórea, best known for coaching Brazil's world champion boxer Acelino Freitas.

While Matos fell in the round of 16 at the 2012 AIBA Women's World Boxing Championships, her consistent results in the 2011-12 cycle earned her an International Boxing Association invitational spot to represent Brazil in the 2012 Summer Olympics in the Flyweight Division. In the Round of 16 she lost to Karlha Magliocco of Venezuela 14-15.

Matos is married to fellow Salvador boxer Robson Conceição, who also competed in the 2012 Summer Olympics and would later become the first Brazilian Olympic boxing champion in 2016. The couple have a daughter, Sophia. Following the Games, Matos declared she would take a sabbatical from boxing to take care of her family, while not discarding a return to the sport to fight in the 2020 Summer Olympics.

== Achievements ==
- 2013 – Brazilian Women's National Championships 1st place – 51 kg
- 2012 – Panamerican Women's Championships (Cornwall, CAN) 2nd place – 51 kg
- 2010 – Panamerican Women's Championships (Brasília, BRA) 1st place – 46 kg
- 2009 – Panamerican Women's Championships (Guayaquil, ECU) 1st place – 46 kg
- 2007 – Panamerican Women's Championships (Duran, ECU) 1st place – 46 kg
- 2012 – Three Nations Women's Meeting (Santo Amaro, BRA) 3rd place – 51 kg
- 2011 – Stars Tournament (Sao Vicente, BRA) 2nd place – 51 kg
- 2011 – 2nd Panamerican Games Qualification Tournament (Quito, ECU) 3rd place – 51 kg
- 2010 – Stars Tournament (Moggi das Cruzes, BRA) 2nd place – 51 kg
- 2010 – Brazilian Women's National Championships 1st place – 48 kg
- 2007 – Brazilian Women's National Championships 1st place – 46 kg
- 2010 – South American Games (Medellin, COL) 1st place – 51 kg
- 2009 – Brazilian Women's National Championships 1st place – 48 kg
- 2005 – Brazilian Women's National Championships 1st place – 46 kg
