= Boxing at the 2011 Pan American Games – Women's flyweight =

Women's flyweight at the 2011 Pan American Games
- Venue: Expo Guadalajara Arena
- Dates: October 21 – 29
- Competitors: 7 from 7 nations

Medalists
Gold medal	Mandy Bujold	Canada
Silver medal	Ingrit Valencia	Colombia
Bronze medal	Pamela Benavidez	Argentina
Bronze medal	Karlha Magliocco	Venezuela

The women's flyweight competition of the boxing events at the 2011 Pan American Games in Guadalajara, Mexico, was held between October 21 and 28 at the Expo Guadalajara Arena. Flyweights were limited to those boxers weighing less than or equal to 51 kilograms. This will be the first time women's boxing will take place at the Pan American Games.

Like all Pan American boxing events, the competition was a straight single-elimination tournament. Both semifinal losers were awarded bronze medals, so no boxers competed again after their first loss. Bouts consisted of four rounds of two minutes each, with one-minute breaks between rounds. Punches scored only if the white area on the front of the glove made full contact with the front of the head or torso of the opponent. Five judges scored each bout; three of the judges had to signal a scoring punch within one second for the punch to score. The winner of the bout was the boxer who scored the most valid punches by the end of the bout.

== Schedule ==
All times are Central Standard Time (UTC-6).

Date	Time	Round
October 21, 2011	18:00	Quarterfinals
October 25, 2011	19:00	Semifinals
October 29, 2011	19:00	Final

== Results ==
=== Bracket ===
Quarterfinals		Semifinals		Finals
		Pamela Benavidez (ARG)	8
Mandy Bujold (CAN)	13	Mandy Bujold (CAN)	12
Silvia Torres (MEX)	6			Mandy Bujold (CAN)	11
Ingrit Valencia (COL)	+4			Ingrit Valencia (COL)	5
Christina Cruz (USA)	4	Ingrit Valencia (COL)	17
Karlha Magliocco (VEN)	27	Karlha Magliocco (VEN)	8
Pamela Sanchez (CRC)	14
