= Peamwilai Laopeam =

Thai boxer (born 1983)

Personal information
- Nickname: Sab (แสบ)
- Nationality: Thai
- Born: 20 October 1983 (age 42) Khlong Lan District, Kamphaeng Phet Province

Sport
- Sport: Boxing
Medal record
Women's amateur boxing
Representing Thailand
World Championships
Silver medal – second place	2016 Astana	Flyweight
Asian Championships
Gold medal – first place	2015 Wulanchabu	Bantamweight
Bronze medal – third place	2001 Bangkok	Light welterweight

Peamwilai Laopeam

Military service
- Allegiance: Thailand
- Branch/service: Royal Thai Navy
- Rank: Sub-Lieutenant

Peamwilai Laopeam (Thai: เปี่ยมวิไล เล่าเปี่ยม; RTGS: Piamwilai Lao-piam; born 20 October 1983 in Khlong Lan District, Kamphaeng Phet Province) is a Thai female boxer.

She represented Thailand at the 2016 Summer Olympics in Rio de Janeiro, in the women's flyweight. She became the first Thai female boxer to compete at the Olympics.
