= 2016 Women's European Amateur Boxing Championships =

Boxing competitions

2016 Women's European Boxing Championships
- Host city: Sofia
- Country: Bulgaria
- Nations: 28
- Athletes: 129
- Dates: 14–24 November
- Main venue: Asics Arena

The Women’s European Boxing Championships was hosted and organised by the Bulgarian Boxing Association in Sofia, Bulgaria in 2016. The event was held from 14 to 24 November 2016. The tournament was organised in association with the European Boxing Confederation (EUBC).

== Medal table ==
Source: Host nation (Bulgaria)

* Host nation (Bulgaria)

Rank	Nation	Gold	Silver	Bronze	Total
1	Russia (RUS)	4	0	4	8
2	Bulgaria (BUL)*	3	0	0	3
3	Turkey (TUR)	1	2	2	5
4	Azerbaijan (AZE)	1	1	2	4
5	England (ENG)	1	0	2	3
6	Poland (POL)	0	1	2	3
7	France (FRA)	0	1	1	2
7	Ukraine (UKR)	0	1	1	2
7	Wales (WAL)	0	1	1	2
10	Finland (FIN)	0	1	0	1
10	Hungary (HUN)	0	1	0	1
10	Sweden (SWE)	0	1	0	1
13	Belarus (BLR)	0	0	2	2
14	Czech Republic (CZE)	0	0	1	1
14	Ireland (IRL)	0	0	1	1
14	Italy (ITA)	0	0	1	1
Totals (16 entries)		10	10	20	40

== Medal winners ==
Event	Gold	Silver	Bronze
Light flyweight (48kg)	(Bulgaria) Sevda Asenova	(Sweden) Lise Sandebjer	(Russia) Ekaterina Pinigina
Light flyweight (48kg)	(Bulgaria) Sevda Asenova	(Sweden) Lise Sandebjer	(Italy) Stephanie Silva
Flyweight (51kg)	(Russia) Elena Savelyeva	(Ukraine) Tetyana Kob	(Poland) Sandra Drabik
Flyweight (51kg)	(Russia) Elena Savelyeva	(Ukraine) Tetyana Kob	(England) Lisa Whiteside
Bantamweight (54kg)	(Bulgaria) Stanimira Petrova	(Azerbaijan) Anna Alimardanova	(Russia) Viktoriia Kuleshova
Bantamweight (54kg)	(Bulgaria) Stanimira Petrova	(Azerbaijan) Anna Alimardanova	(France) Delphine Mancini
Featherweight (57kg)	(Bulgaria) Denitsa Eliseeva	(Turkey) Satı Burcu	(Russia) Natalya Samokhina
Featherweight (57kg)	(Bulgaria) Denitsa Eliseeva	(Turkey) Satı Burcu	(Belarus) Yuliya Apanasovich
Lightweight (60kg)	(Russia) Daria Abramova	(Finland) Mira Potkonen	(Turkey) Esra Yıldız
Lightweight (60kg)	(Russia) Daria Abramova	(Finland) Mira Potkonen	(England) Sandy Ryan
Light welterweight (64kg)	(Russia) Aleksandra Ordina	(Wales) Rosie Eccles	(Czech Republic) Martina Schmoranzová
Light welterweight (64kg)	(Russia) Aleksandra Ordina	(Wales) Rosie Eccles	(Poland) Kinga Siwa
Welterweight (69kg)	(Azerbaijan) Elena Vystropova	(Turkey) Sema Çalışkan	(Russia) Saadat Abdulaeva
Welterweight (69kg)	(Azerbaijan) Elena Vystropova	(Turkey) Sema Çalışkan	(Ukraine) Tetiana Petrovich
Middleweight (75kg)	(England) Natasha Gale	(France) Maily Nicar	(Wales) Lauren Price
Middleweight (75kg)	(England) Natasha Gale	(France) Maily Nicar	(Republic of Ireland) Christine Desmond
Light heavyweight (81kg)	(Turkey) Elif Güneri	(Hungary) Petra Szatmari	(Azerbaijan) Leyla Javadova
Light heavyweight (81kg)	(Turkey) Elif Güneri	(Hungary) Petra Szatmari	(Belarus) Victoriya Kebikava
Heavyweight (+81kg)	(Russia) Zenfira Magomedalieva	(Poland) Sylwia Kusiak	(Azerbaijan) Aynur Rzayeva
Heavyweight (+81kg)	(Russia) Zenfira Magomedalieva	(Poland) Sylwia Kusiak	(Turkey) Şennur Demir

== Participating nations ==
129 boxers from 28 nations competed.

- Armenia (1)
- Azerbaijan (9)
- Belarus (6)
- Bulgaria (6)
- Croatia (5)
- Czech Republic (2)
- Denmark (2)
- England (7)
- Finland (4)
- France (3)
- Greece (1)
- Hungary (9)
- Ireland (7)
- Italy (7)
- Lithuania (2)
- Moldova (1)
- Montenegro (1)
- Netherlands (1)
- Norway (2)
- Poland (5)
- Romania (4)
- Russia (10)
- Serbia (4)
- Switzerland (1)
- Sweden (6)
- Turkey (9)
- Ukraine (10)
- Wales (4)
