= Boxing at the 2010 South American Games – Women's 51kg =

The Women's 51 kg event at the 2010 South American Games had its semifinals held on March 25 and the final on March 27.

== Medalists ==
Gold	Silver	Bronze
Érica Matos; Brazil	Paola Benavides; Argentina	Nupirat Kuja Wachapa; Ecuador; Ingrit Valencia; Colombia

== Results ==
Semifinals
1	Nupirat Kuja Wachapa (ECU)	0
4	Érica Matos (BRA)	21
3	Ingrit Valencia (COL)	6
2	Paola Benavides (ARG)	27

Final
Érica Matos (BRA)	22
Paola Benavides (ARG)	10
