= Tsukimi Namiki =

Japanese boxer (born 1998)

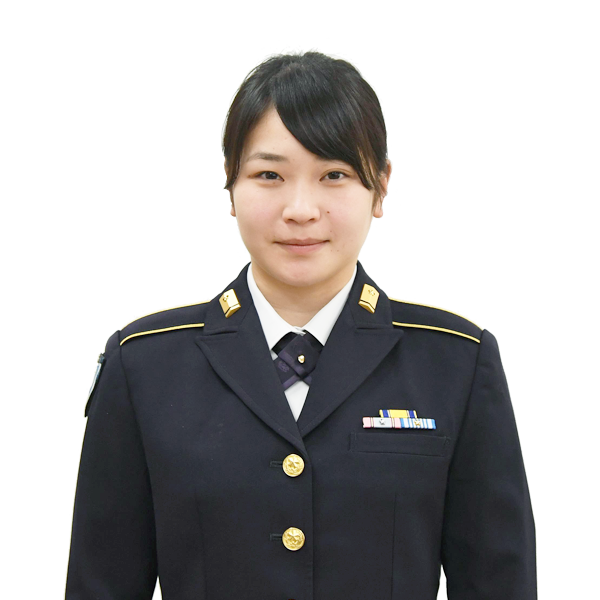
- Namiki in 2021

Personal information
- Nationality: Japanese
- Born: 17 September 1998 (age 28) Narita, Chiba
- Height: 153 cm (5 ft 0 in)
- Weight: 50 kg (110 lb)

Boxing career
- Weight class: Flyweight
Medal record
Women's amateur boxing
Representing Japan
Olympic Games
Bronze medal – third place	2020 Tokyo	Flyweight
World Championships
Bronze medal – third place	2018 New Delhi	Flyweight
Asian Championships
Silver medal – second place	2022 Amman	Light flyweight

Tsukimi Namiki (Japanese: 並木 月海. Namiki Tsukimi) is a Japanese amateur boxer. She won the bronze medal in the women's flyweight event at the 2020 Summer Olympics.

== Career ==
She began boxing in 2013. In 2015, she competed at the Balkan Women’s Youth Tournament, winning a gold medal, 2018 Republic of Kazakhstan President’s Cup, winning a gold medal, and 2018 AIBA Women’s World Boxing Championships, winning a bronze medal.

She advanced through the Asia and Oceania tournament to qualify for the 2020 Summer Olympics.
