= Lisa Whiteside =

English boxer (born 1985)

Personal information
- Nationality: English
- Born: 17 September 1985 (age 40) Chorley, Lancashire, England
- Height: 1.58 m (5 ft 2 in)
- Weight: Flyweight, Bantamweight, Super-bantamweight, Featherweight

Boxing career

Boxing record
- Total fights: 6
- Wins: 5
- Win by KO: 1
- Losses: 1
Medal record
Women's amateur boxing
Representing England
World Championships
Silver medal – second place	2014 Jeju City	Flyweight
Bronze medal – third place	2012 Qinhuangdao	Featherweight
European Championships
Silver medal – second place	2011 Rotterdam	Featherweight
Bronze medal – third place	2016 Sofia	Flyweight
Commonwealth Games
Gold medal – first place	2018 Gold Coast	Flyweight
European Union Championships
Gold medal – first place	2013 Keszthely	Bantamweight

Lisa Whiteside (born 17 September 1985) is an English professional boxer who was a multi-time international medalist as an amateur.

== Amateur career ==
Whiteside won international championship medals across three weight categories including silver in the flyweight division at the 2014 AIBA Women's World Boxing Championships in South Korea where she lost in the final to Marlen Esparza from the USA by split decision. Representing England, she won gold at the 2018 Commonwealth Games in Australia defeating Northern Ireland's Carly McNaul in the flyweight final.

== Professional career ==
Whiteside joined the professional boxing ranks in January 2019 and had her first fight on 18 May that year securing a points win over Dani Hodges. Having won her first three pro contests, Whiteside took almost three years off from boxing to start a family. She returned to the ring on 30 July 2022 with a points win over Jasmina Nad. Whiteside challenged for the vacant Commonwealth female super-bantamweight title at York Hall in London on 14 April 2023 but lost to Tysie Gallagher by unanimous decision.

== Professional boxing record ==
6 fights	5 wins	1 loss
By knockout	1	0
By decision	4	1

No.	Result	Record	Opponent	Type	Round, time	Date	Location	Notes
6	Loss	5–1	Tysie Gallagher	UD	10 (10)	14 April 2023	York Hall, London, England	Lost challenge for the vacant Commonwealth female super-bantamweight title
5	Win	5–0	Eva Cantos	PTS	8 (8)	11 November 2022	Sheffield Arena, Sheffield, England	
4	Win	4–0	Jasmina Nad	PTS	6 (6)	30 July 2022	Vertu Motors Arena, Newcastle, England	
3	Win	3–0	Evgeniya Zablotskaya	TKO	2 (6)	13 September 2019	Bolton Whites Hotel, Bolton, England	
2	Win	2–0	Klaudia Ferenczi	PTS	6 (6)	5 July 2019	Bolton Whites Hotel, Bolton, England	
1	Win	1–0	Dani Hodges	PTS	4 (4)	18 May 2019	Lamex Stadium, Stevenage, England	
