= Carly McNaul =

Irish boxer (born 1989)

Personal information
- Nickname: Wrecking Ball McNaul
- Born: 22 June 1989 (age 37) Belfast, Northern Ireland
- Height: 160 cm (5 ft 3 in)
- Weight: Flyweight, Light-flyweight

Boxing career
- Stance: Orthodox
Medal record
Representing Northern Ireland
Commonwealth Games
Silver medal – second place	2018 Gold Coast	Flyweight
Silver medal – second place	2022 Birmingham	Light Flyweight

Carly McNaul (born 22 June 1989) is an Irish boxer. Representing Northern Ireland, she won silver medals in the flyweight category at the 2018 Commonwealth Games and in the light-flyweight division at the 2022 Commonwealth Games.

McNaul competed for Ireland at the 2022 Women's World Boxing Championships, losing in the quarter-finals of the flyweight competition.

She trains at the Ormeau Road Boxing Club.
