= Miguelina Hernández =

Dominican Republic boxer (born 1998)

Personal information
- Full name: Miguelina Hernández García
- Nationality: Dominican
- Born: 28 March 1998 (age 28)

Sport
- Sport: Boxing
Medal record
Representing Dominican Republic
Pan American Games
Bronze medal – third place	2019 Lima	51 kg
Bolivarian Games
Silver medal – second place	2022 Valledupar	51 kg

Miguelina Hernández García (born 28 March 1998) is a Dominican Republic boxer. She competed in the women's flyweight event at the 2020 Summer Olympics.
