= Caroline de Almeida =

Brazilian boxer (born 1992)

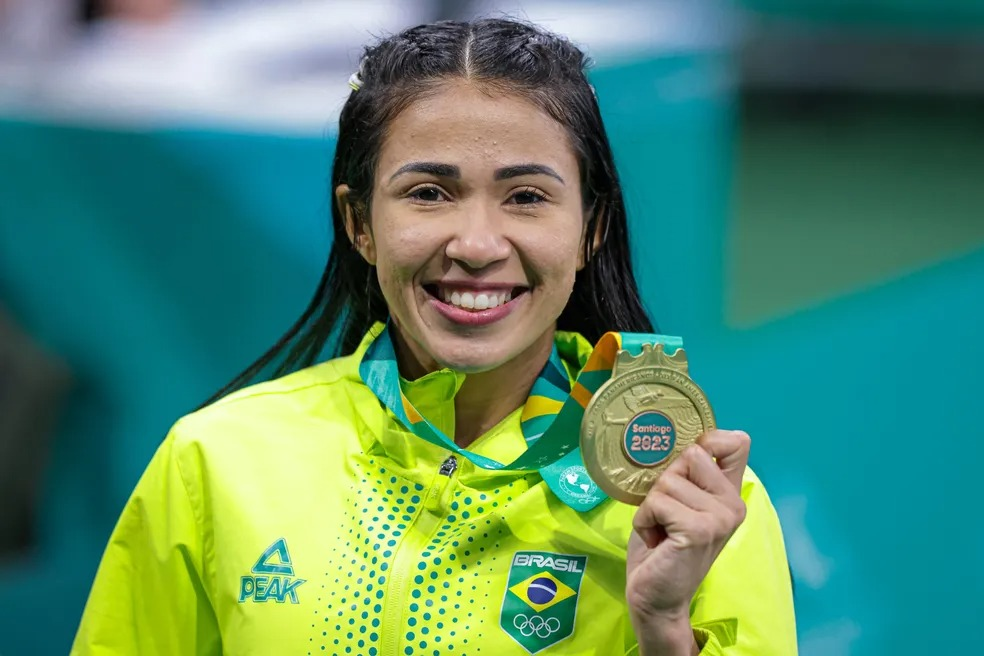

Personal information
- Nationality: Brazilian
- Born: February 2, 1992 (age 34)
- Height: 1.65 m (5 ft 5 in)

Boxing career
Medal record
Women's amateur boxing
Representing Brazil
Pan American Games
| Gold medal – first place | 2023 Santiago | Women's 50 kg |

Caroline de Almeida (born 2 February 1992) is a Brazilian boxer. She won the gold medal in the 2023 Pan American Games in Boxing in the Women's 50 kg category.

She qualified to represent Brazil at the 2024 Summer Olympics.
