= Virginia Fuchs =

American boxer (born 1988)

Personal information
- Born: 9 March 1988 (age 38) Houston, Texas, USA
- Height: 163 cm (5 ft 4 in)
- Weight: Flyweight, Super-flyweight

Boxing career
- Stance: Southpaw

Boxing record
- Total fights: 5
- Wins: 4
- Win by KO: 1
- Losses: 1
Medal record
Women's amateur boxing
Representing United States
World Championships
Bronze medal – third place	2018 New Delhi	Flyweight
Pan American Games
Silver medal – second place	2019 Lima	Flyweight

Virginia "Ginny" Fuchs (born March 9, 1988) is an American professional boxer. She is a former interim WBC female super-flyweight champion. As an amateur Fuchs represented her country at the delayed 2020 Summer Olympics as well as winning a bronze medal at the 2018 World Championships and a silver medal at the 2019 Pan American Games.

== Early life and education ==
Fuchs was born in Houston, Texas. Fuchs became interested in sports at a young age and played soccer, softball, and basketball as a child. She attended Episcopal High School where she ran track and cross-country.

Her athletic abilities earned her an invitation for walk-on spot on the track and cross-country team at Louisiana State University. Fuchs graduated from LSU in 2011 with a bachelor's degree in kinesiology.

== Amateur boxing career ==
Fuchs first tried boxing during her sophomore year of college to stay in shape. After a coach took an interest in her, she dedicated her focus to boxing in 2008. She trained for a year before her first fight, which she won.

She began to compete at the state level and won three Louisiana state Golden Gloves, and later won a national Golden Gloves title in 2015. Fuchs was a finalist for the US National Tournament for 2013, 2014 and 2015.

When it was announced that women’s boxing would be added to the 2012 Summer Olympics, Fuchs tried for a spot on the USA Boxing team but future Olympic medalist Marlen Esparza received the only flyweight position. Fuchs finished fourth at the Olympic Test Event.

In October 2015, she defeated Esparza in the Olympic Test Event for the USA Boxing flyweight spot for the 2016 Summer Olympics. Fuchs has also defeated Olympic medalist and five-time world champion, Mary Kom of India. Fuchs won gold at the Olympic Trials Test Event.

Fuchs was 1st in the 2016 USA Boxing Nationals defeating Esparza for the third straight time with a unanimous 5-0 decision. She won bronze at the 2018 AIBA world championship in India.

In 2020, Fuchs tested positive for a banned substance, but was ruled not at fault due to contamination via unprotected sexual intercourse.

Fuchs qualified for the 2020 Tokyo Olympics, held in 2021, where she was defeated in the round of 16 by Bulgarian boxer Stoyka Krasteva.

== Professional boxing career ==
Fuchs announced she was joining the professional boxing ranks in December 2021. She made her pro-debut with a fourth-round knockout win over Randee Lynn Morales on 9 April 2022 at The Hangar, Costa Mesa, California, on the undercard of her friend Mikaela Mayer's unified super-featherweight title defence against Jennifer Han.

Her second outing as a professional was at The O2 Arena in London, England, on an all-female card topped by the Claressa Shields vs Savannah Marshall unified middleweight title showdown on 15 October 2022. Fuchs defeated Gemma Ruegg on points over six rounds.

Fuchs next contest was at Smoothie King Center in New Orleans, Louisiana, on 17 June 2023 when she overcame a cut above her left eye from an accidental clash of heads in the third round to beat Indeya Smith by unanimous decision in an eight-round battle.

In February 2024, Fuchs revealed she had agreed to join the second season of boxing's first squad-based format, Team Combat League (TCL), competing for the Houston Hitmen. She made her first TCL appearance at Red Owl Boxing Arena, Houston, Texas, on 18 April 2024 winning both her rounds against Tiana Schroeder by unanimous decision.

Fuchs challenged Adelaida Ruiz for the interim WBC female super-flyweight title at Dignity Health Sports Park, Carson, California, on 31 August 2024, winning the fight by split decision with one judge scoring it 97-93 for Ruiz but the other two having it for Fuchs 97-93 and 100-90 respectively. She got the win despite suffering an open dislocation of her right thumb in the first round. Fuchs was named Female Fighter of the Year at the 2024 Houston Boxing Awards.

Having been away from the competitive boxing ring for almost two years, Fuchs faced Adelaida Ruiz in a rematch with the full WBC female super-flyweight title on the line at the NOS Event Center in San Bernardino, California, on 18 July 2026. She lost by unanimous decision.

== Personal life ==
Fuchs is an advocate for mental health awareness and was diagnosed with obsessive–compulsive disorder (OCD) at a young age. She has appeared in the PBS documentary series Mysteries of Mental Illness and the Oprah Winfrey/Apple TV documentary series The Me You Can't See. Fuchs cites Olympian and runner Steve Prefontaine as an inspiration for her athletic career.

== Professional boxing record ==
5 fights	4 wins	1 loss
By knockout	1	0
By decision	3	1

No.	Result	Record	Opponent	Type	Round, time	Date	Location	Notes
5	Loss	4–1	Adelaida Ruiz	UD	10	18 Jul 2026	Orange Show Events, Center, San Bernardino, California, U.S.	For WBC female super-flyweight title
4	Win	4–0	Adelaida Ruiz	SD	10	31 Aug 2024	Dignity Health Sports Park, Carson, California, U.S.	Won interim WBC female super-flyweight title
3	Win	3–0	Indeya Smith	UD	8	17 Jun 2023	Smoothie King Center, New Orleans, Louisiana, U.S.	
2	Win	2–0	Gemma Ruegg	PTS	6	15 Oct 2022	The O2 Arena, London, England	
1	Win	1–0	Randee Lynn Morales	KO	4 (6), 0:24	9 Apr 2022	The Hangar, Costa Mesa, California, U.S.	
