= Nicola Adams =

British boxer (born 1982)

Nicola Adams OBE
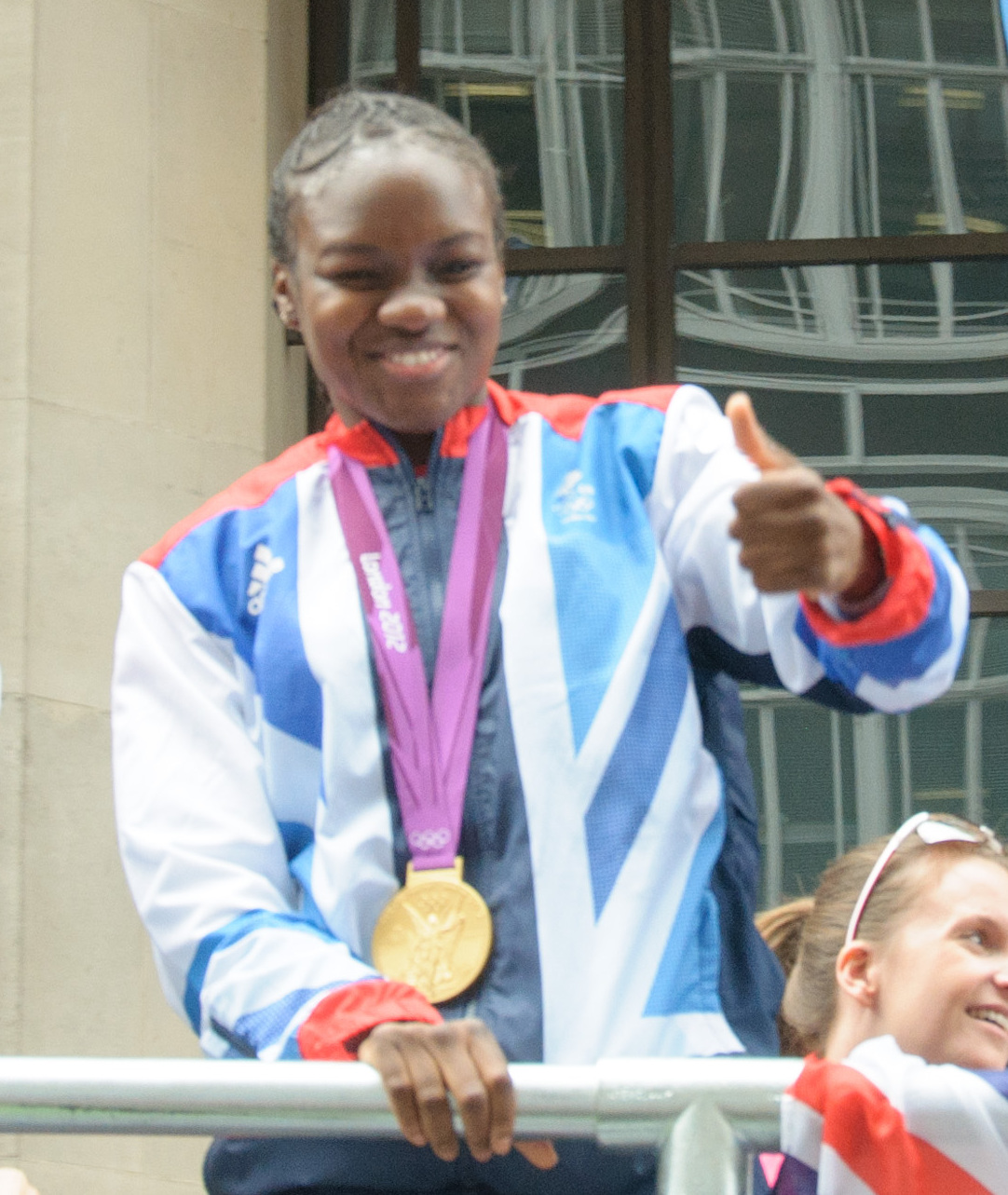
- Adams in 2012

Personal information
- Nicknames: The Lioness, Babyface
- Born: 26 October 1982 (age 43) Leeds, West Yorkshire, England
- Height: 5 ft 4.5 in (164 cm)
- Weight: Flyweight

Boxing career

Boxing record
- Total fights: 6
- Wins: 5
- Win by KO: 3
- Losses: 0
- Draws: 1
Medal record
Event	1st	2nd	3rd
Olympic Games	2	0	0
World Championships	1	3	0
European Championships	1	1	0
European Games	1	0	0
European Union Championships	2	0	0
Commonwealth Games	1	0	0
Total	8	4	0
Women's amateur boxing
Representing United Kingdom
Olympic Games
Gold medal – first place	2012 London	Flyweight
Gold medal – first place	2016 Rio de Janeiro	Flyweight
World Championships
Gold medal – first place	2016 Astana	Flyweight
European Games
Gold medal – first place	2015 Baku	Flyweight
Representing England
World Championships
Silver medal – second place	2008 Ningbo	Bantamweight
Silver medal – second place	2010 Bridgetown	Flyweight
Silver medal – second place	2012 Qinhuangdao	Flyweight
Commonwealth Games
Gold medal – first place	2014 Glasgow	Flyweight
European Championships
Gold medal – first place	2011 Rotterdam	Flyweight
Silver medal – second place	2007 Vejle	Bantamweight
EU Championships
Gold medal – first place	2011 Katowice	Flyweight
Gold medal – first place	2013 Keszthely	Flyweight

Nicola Virginia Adams OBE (born 26 October 1982) is a British former professional boxer who competed from 2007 to 2019. She retired with an undefeated record and held the World Boxing Organization (WBO) female flyweight title in 2019. As an amateur, she became the first female boxer to become an Olympic champion after winning gold at London 2012, and the first double Olympic champion following a second gold medal at Rio 2016, both in the flyweight division. As of 27 May 2016 she was the reigning Olympic, World and European Games champion at flyweight, and won the entire set of amateur championships available to her – Olympic, Commonwealth and European Games' titles, and the World, European and European Union championships.

== Early life ==
Adams was born in Leeds, West Yorkshire, on 26 October 1982. She was educated at Agnes Stewart Church of England High School, Ebor Gardens, Burmantofts, Leeds. She also went to Hopwood Hall College in Rochdale.

== Amateur career ==
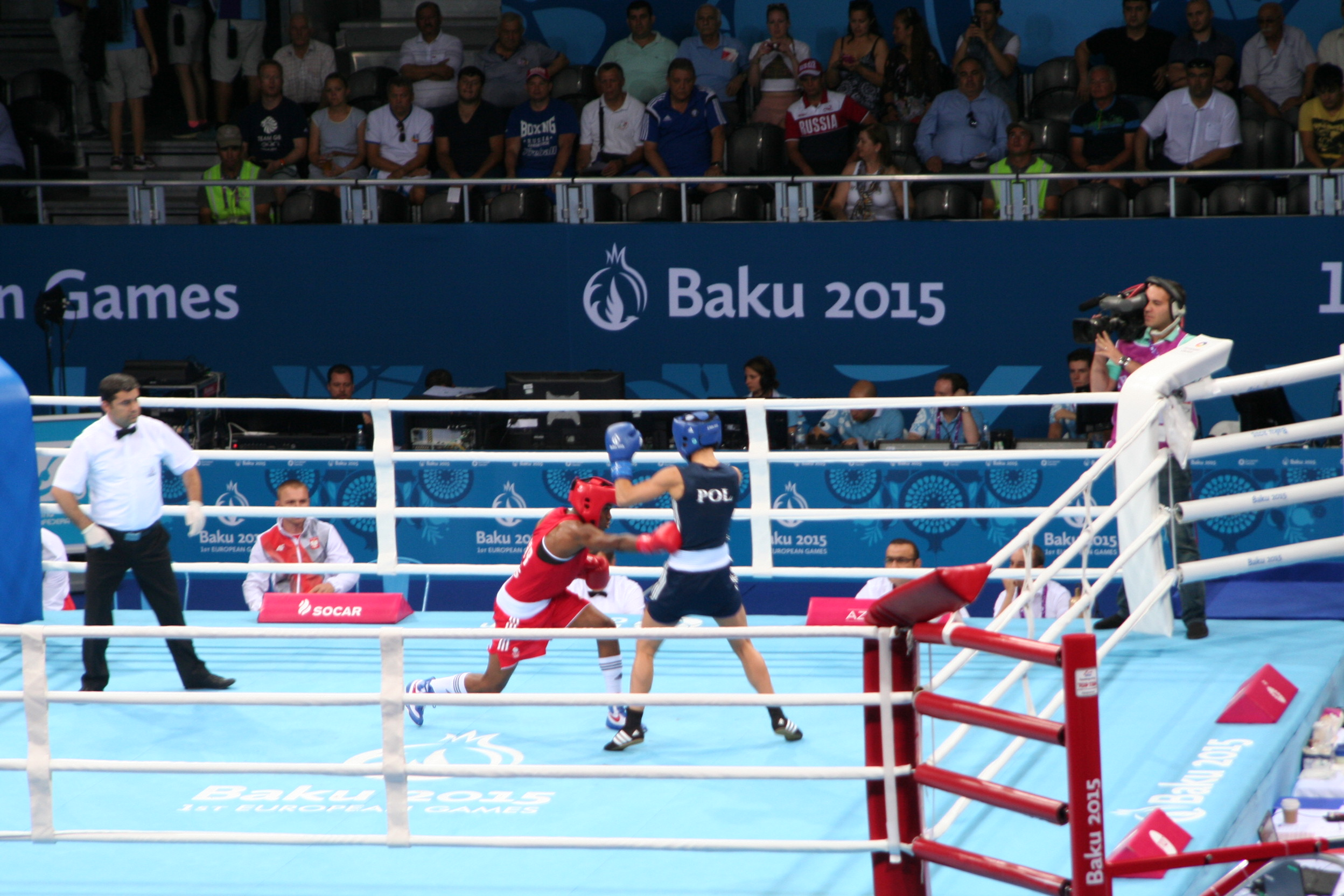
Adams (red) at the final of the European Games 2015 in Baku (Azerbaijan)

Adams represented Haringey Police Community Club at boxing. She fought (and won) her first bout at the age of 13, but it was four years before she found a second opponent. In 2001, she became the first woman boxer ever to represent England, in a fight against an Irish boxer. In 2003, she became English amateur champion for the first time, and she retained the title at the next three championships.

In 2007, Adams became the first English female boxer to win a medal in a major boxing tournament, taking silver in the European Championships. She won silver again at the world championships in Ningbo, China, in 2008, which was Britain’s first women’s world championship medal in women’s boxing. The following year she had to abstain from the sport for several months due to a back injury, but she returned to success at the 2010 world championships in Bridgetown, Barbados, taking Silver again, competing now at flyweight (51kg). Adams struggled to continue her boxing career due to lack of funds. She worked as an acting extra on soap operas such as Coronation Street, Emmerdale, and EastEnders, and worked as a builder before the International Olympic Committee backed funding for women's boxing in 2009.

In November 2010, Adams was victorious in the first-ever GB Amateur Boxing Championship at the Echo Arena Liverpool. In 2011, she won gold medals at the European Union Championships and the European Championships. In July 2011, the BBC included Adams in a feature on "6 Promising Britons to watch in the Olympics".

In the 2012 Summer Olympics, Adams defeated Mary Kom from India in the Flyweight semi-final. She went on to defeat Chinese boxer and world number one Ren Cancan in the final to claim the first Olympic women's boxing gold medal.

At the 2014 Commonwealth Games in Glasgow, Adams defeated Michaela Walsh of Northern Ireland to take the gold medal in the women's flyweight division on a split decision.

At the 2016 Rio Olympic games Adams successfully defended her Olympic title, defeating Sarah Ourahmoune of France in the Final on 20 August.

== Professional career ==
On 23 January 2017, it was confirmed that Adams had turned professional, having signed with promoter Frank Warren. She made her debut on 8 April, scoring a four-round points decision victory against Virginia Carcamo at the Manchester Arena.

After securing another three wins, all by technical knockout, she faced former world champion Isabel Millan for the WBO interim female flyweight title on 6 October 2018 at the Morningside Arena in Leicester. Fighting beyond four rounds for the first time in her career, Adams defeated Millan via ten-round unanimous decision to capture the WBO interim title. Two judges scored the bout 97–93 and the third scored it 96–94. After the win Frank Warren stated, "She is a champion, there's no going backwards, on 22nd December I'm hoping it will be for the full title".

She was scheduled to challenge for the full world title on 8 March 2019 against reigning WBO female flyweight champion Arely Muciño at the Royal Albert Hall in London. However, the fight was postponed after Adams sustained an injury during training and was forced to withdraw. After Muciño suffered an injury during a successful defence of her title in April followed by an ankle injury sustained in a car crash, the WBO announced that Adams had been elevated from interim to full WBO champion in July 2019 due to Muciño being unable to "participate in active competition".

The first defence of her title came against former world title challenger Maria Salinas. The bout took place on 27 September 2019 at the Royal Albert Hall and was aired live on BT Sport in the UK and ESPN+ in the US. After eleven months out of the ring, in what was the first ever female professional boxing match to be held at the Royal Albert Hall, Adams retained her title with a split draw. One judge scored the bout 97–93 to Adams, another scored it 96–94 to Salinas, while the third scored it even at 95–95.

=== Retirement ===
During the first round of her match with Salinas, Adams suffered a torn pupil. She initially thought it to be a minor injury. In an interview with BBC Radio 5 Live Adams said, "I didn't think it would be anything too serious but I had torn the pupil in my eye. I got the injury in the first round of my last fight [against Maria Salinas]. I phoned the doctors a couple of days afterwards. I could take the chance and keep boxing and hope nothing would happen to my eye or an unlucky punch could mean I lose my sight."

She announced her retirement on 6 November 2019 in an open letter in the Yorkshire Evening Post, saying, "I’m immensely honoured to have represented our country – to win double Olympic gold medals and then the WBO championship belt is a dream come true… But it’s not without taking its toll on my body, and aside from the expected aches and pains - I’ve been advised that any further impact to my eye would most likely lead to irreparable damage and permanent vision loss."

At both the Tokyo 2020 and Paris 2024 Olympics, Adams appeared on the BBC's coverage as their boxing analyst.

In April 2021, Adams joined fellow British Olympians Greg Rutherford and Kelly Smith, and fitness instructor Mr Motivator in launching the ‘Energy Fit for the Future’ campaign by Smart Energy GB, which aimed at encouraging people to install smart meters in their homes.

== Honours and awards ==
=== Boxing championships ===
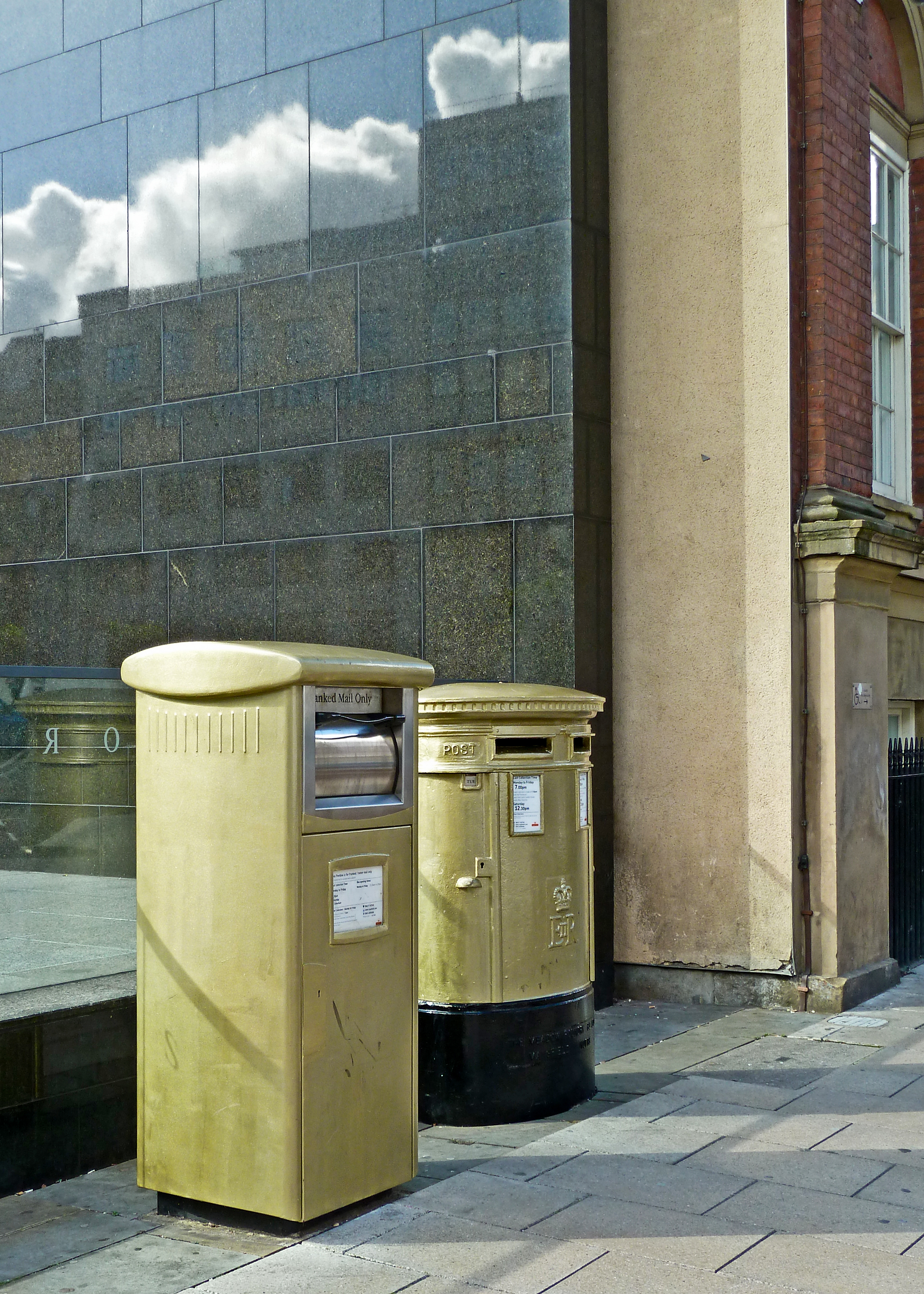
Postboxes on Cookridge Street in Leeds painted gold in honour of Adams' Olympic Gold medal win.

Year	Tournament	Venue	Result	Event
2007	European Amateur Championships	Vejle, Denmark	2nd	54 kg
2008	World Amateur Championship	Ningbo, People's Republic of China	2nd	54 kg
2010	World Amateur Championship	Bridgetown, Barbados	2nd	51 kg
2011	European Union Amateur Championships	Katowice, Poland	1st	51 kg
2011	European Amateur Championships	Rotterdam, the Netherlands	1st	51 kg
2012	World Amateur Championship	Qinhuangdao, China	2nd	51 kg
2012	Summer Olympics	London, United Kingdom	1st	51 kg
2013	European Union Amateur Championships	Keszthely, Hungary	1st	51 kg
2014	Commonwealth Games	Glasgow, United Kingdom	1st	51 kg
2015	European Games	Baku, Azerbaijan	1st	51 kg
2016	World Amateur Championship	Astana, Kazakhstan	1st	51 kg
2016	Summer Olympics	Rio de Janeiro, Brazil	1st	51 kg

==== Other ====
In 2012, she became the first female boxer to receive an award from the Boxing Writers' Club of Great Britain. Specifically, she was awarded the Joe Bromley Award for outstanding services to boxing. She was also the first woman ever to be invited to the club's awards ceremony.

In 2012, too, she was a nominee for BBC Sports Personality of the Year.

In November 2012, she topped the list of The Independent's 101 most influential LGBT people in Britain for 2012.

She was appointed Member of the Order of the British Empire (MBE) in the 2013 New Year Honours and later Officer of the Order of the British Empire (OBE) in the 2017 New Year Honours for services to boxing.

In July 2015, she was awarded an honorary Doctor of Laws degree by the University of Leeds. In November 2015, she was listed as one of BBC's 100 Women.

In 2016, Adams was named Number One in the DIVA Power List of the UK's most eminent lesbian and bisexual women.

In 2018, a Barbie doll based on her was produced; it was the first boxer Barbie doll.

In 2019 she was included in the annual Powerlist, being recognised as one of the most influential black Britons.

On 2 September 2020, it was announced that Adams would be a contestant on the eighteenth series of Strictly Come Dancing and that she would feature in the competition's first same-sex couple alongside professional Katya Jones. On 12 November 2020, they were forced to withdraw from the competition after Jones tested positive for COVID-19.

Adams' name is one of those featured on the sculpture Ribbons, unveiled in 2024.

== Professional boxing record ==
6 fights	5 wins	0 losses
By knockout	3	0
By decision	2	0
Draws	1	

No.	Result	Record	Opponent	Type	Round, time	Date	Location	Notes
6	Draw	5–0–1	Maria Salinas	SD	10	27 Sep 2019	Royal Albert Hall, London, England	Retained WBO female flyweight title
5	Win	5–0	Isabel Millan	UD	10	6 Oct 2018	Morningside Arena, Leicester, England	Won vacant WBO female interim flyweight title
4	Win	4–0	Soledad del Valle Frias	KO	1 (10), 2:59	19 May 2018	Elland Road, Leeds, England	
3	Win	3–0	Soledad Macedo	TKO	3 (6), 1:26	16 Dec 2017	Place Bell, Laval, Quebec, Canada	
2	Win	2–0	Maryan Salazar	TKO	3 (4), 0:35	13 May 2017	First Direct Arena, Leeds, England	
1	Win	1–0	Virginia Noemi Carcamo	PTS	4	8 Apr 2017	Manchester Arena, Manchester, England	

== Personal life ==
On 12 July 2022, Adams announced the birth of her first child with her girlfriend Ella Baig.

== Television ==
Year	Title	Role	Notes
2013	Waterloo Road	Self	Series 9, Episode 9
2019	The Great Celebrity Bake Off for SU2C	Contestant	Series 2, Episode 5
2020	Celebrity Gogglebox	Self	Series 2
2020	Strictly Come Dancing	Contestant	Series 18
2023	Scared of the Dark	Contestant	

== See also ==
- 2012 Summer Olympics and Paralympics gold post boxes

Sporting positions
World boxing titles
New title	WBO female flyweight champion Interim title 6 October 2018 – 29 July 2019; Promoted	Vacant
Vacant Title last held by Arely Muciño	WBO female flyweight champion 29 July 2019 – 6 November 2019; Retired	Vacant Title next held by Débora Anahí López
