= Mandy Bujold =

Canadian boxer (born 1987)

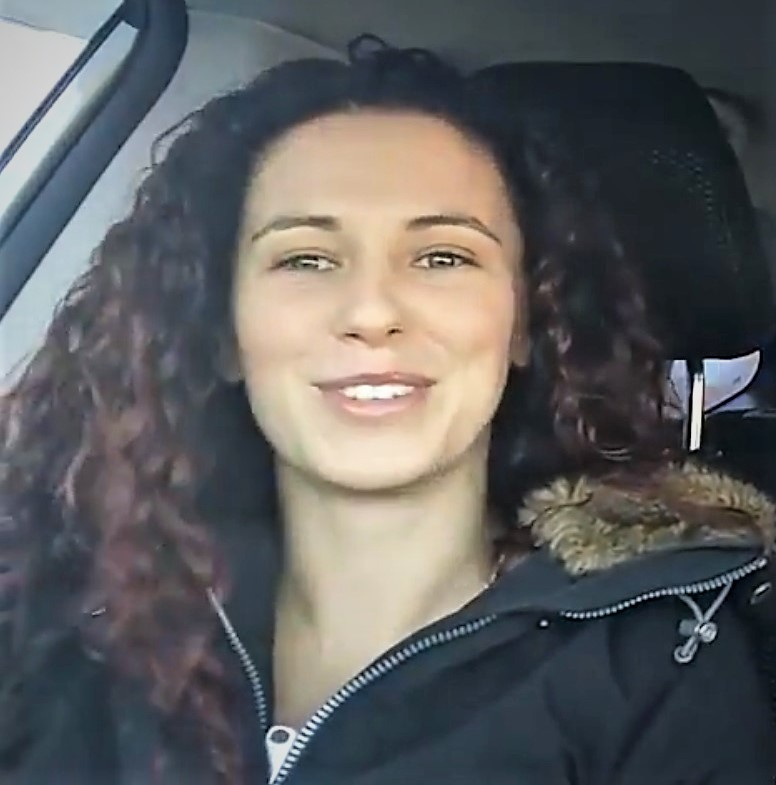
- Bujold interviewed in a car in 2018

Personal information
- Full name: Mandy Marie Brigitte Bujold
- Born: 25 July 1987 (age 39) Cobourg, Ontario, Canada
- Height: 160 cm (5 ft 3 in)
- Weight: 51 kg (112 lb)
- Website: MandyBujold.com

Sport
- Sport: Boxing
- Weight class: Flyweight
Medal record
Women's amateur boxing
Representing Canada
Pan American Games
Gold medal – first place	2011 Guadalajara	Flyweight
Gold medal – first place	2015 Toronto	Flyweight
Commonwealth Games
Bronze medal – third place	2014 Glasgow	Flyweight

Mandy Marie Brigitte Bujold (born 25 July 1987) is a Canadian former amateur boxer. She won gold medals in the women's flyweight category at the 2011 and 2015 Pan American Games and won a bronze medal at the 2014 Commonwealth Games in Glasgow. She competed at the 2016 Summer Olympics and competed at the delayed 2020 Summer Olympics following an appeal to the Court of Arbitration for Sport.

== Career ==
Bujold was coached by the late Adrian Teodorescu, who had previously coached Lennox Lewis. Bujold has won the Canadian National Championships on 11 occasions. In 2006, she won the Canadian Junior National Championships.

Bujold made her first senior international appearance at the 2008 AIBA Women's World Boxing Championships. She won a gold medal in the women's flyweight category at the 2011 Pan American Games. She was not selected for the 2012 Summer Olympics. At the 2014 Commonwealth Games in Glasgow, Bujold won a bronze medal, after losing to Briton Nicola Adams in the semi-finals. In the same year, Bujold finished fourth at the 2014 AIBA Women's World Boxing Championships. She won another gold medal at the 2015 Pan American Games. She was critical of a proposal to remove head protection for amateur boxers, and at one point, she threatened to retire if the rule was enacted.

In July 2016, she was officially named to Canada's Olympic team, after having won the Olympic qualifying event in Buenos Aires in March 2016. She was one of three Canadian boxers at the Games and was considered Canada's best boxing medal prospect. During the Games, she was hospitalized for one night with gastroenteritis. She lost 2 kilograms (4.4 lb) of liquid from her body. She lost in the quarter-finals of the competition, having only left the hospital two hours before the fight commenced. Following the Games, she took some time away from boxing. She withdrew from selection for the 2018 Commonwealth Games after being told that she would need to live in Montreal; she had previously been selected in the squad.

In December 2019, Bujold won the Canadian Olympic qualification tournament. She was scheduled to participate in the 2020 Summer Olympics qualification event in May 2021 before the event was cancelled due to the COVID-19 pandemic. As a result, the International Olympic Committee (IOC) chose to instead consider results from 2018 and 2019, which meant that Bujold was not considered, as she had been pregnant and on maternity leave during that period. Bujold, supported by Canadian Minister of Canadian Heritage Steven Guilbeault, the Canadian Olympic Committee (COC), and Boxing Canada, appealed to the IOC to reconsider this decision but received no reply. Bujold appealed to the Court of Arbitration for Sport (CAS); on 30 June 2021, CAS awarded her a place at the Games. The court ruled that the qualification system must accommodate pregnant or postpartum women during the qualification period. The COC released a statement supporting the CAS outcome. At the Games, Bujold lost her first-round match to Serbian Nina Radovanović.

Bujold announced her retirement from boxing after the 2020 Summer Olympics.

== Personal life ==
Bujold was born in Cobourg, Ontario, and now lives in Kitchener, Ontario. Aside from boxing, she has worked for Communitech. In November 2018, her daughter was born.
