= Ingrit Valencia =

Colombian boxer (born 1988)

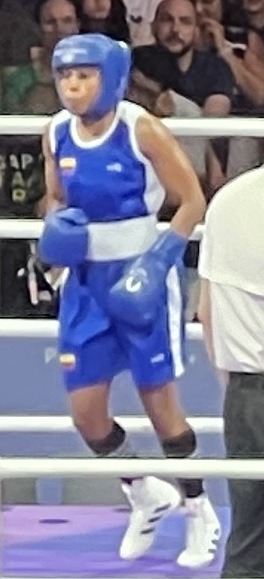
- Valencia at the 2024 Summer Olympics

Personal information
- Full name: Ingrit Lorena Valencia Victoria
- Nationality: Colombian
- Born: 3 September 1988 (age 37) Morales, Cauca, Colombia
- Height: 1.60 m (5 ft 3 in)
- Weight: 51 kg (112 lb)

Sport
- Sport: Boxing
- Weight class: Flyweight
Medal record
Representing Colombia
Women's amateur boxing
Event	1st	2nd	3rd
Olympic Games	0	0	1
World Championships	0	1	1
Pan American Games	1	1	2
CAC Games	3	0	0
South American Games	3	0	1
Bolivarian Games	2	1	0
Total	9	3	5
Olympic Games
Bronze medal – third place	2016 Rio de Janeiro	Flyweight
World Championships
Silver medal – second place	2022 Istanbul	Light flyweight
Bronze medal – third place	2023 New Delhi	Light flyweight
Pan American Games
Gold medal – first place	2019 Lima	Flyweight
Silver medal – second place	2011 Guadalajara	Flyweight
Bronze medal – third place	2015 Toronto	Flyweight
Bronze medal – third place	2023 Santiago	Light flyweight
Central American and Caribbean Games
Gold medal – first place	2014 Veracruz	Flyweight
Gold medal – first place	2018 Barranquilla	Flyweight
Gold medal – first place	2023 San Salvador	Light flyweight
South American Games
Gold medal – first place	2014 Santiago	Flyweight
Gold medal – first place	2018 Cochabamba	Flyweight
Gold medal – first place	2022 Asunción	Light flyweight
Bronze medal – third place	2010 Medellín	Flyweight
Bolivarian Games
Gold medal – first place	2017 Santa Marta	Flyweight
Gold medal – first place	2022 Valledupar	Flyweight
Silver medal – second place	2013 Trujillo	Flyweight

Ingrit Lorena Valencia Victoria (born 3 September 1988) is a Colombian female boxer.

She represented Colombia at the 2016 Summer Olympics in Rio de Janeiro, in the women's flyweight, and won the bronze medal. She was the flag bearer for Colombia during the closing ceremony.

She competed at the 2020 Summer Olympics in Tokyo, earning a bronze medal. She again represented Colombia at the 2024 Summer Olympics in Paris.
