= Sandra Drabik =

Polish boxer (born 1988)

Personal information
- Born: 13 August 1988 (age 37) Kielce, Poland

Sport
- Country: Poland
- Sport: Boxing
Medal record
European Games
Silver medal – second place	2015 Baku	Flyweight
Bronze medal – third place	2019 Minsk	Flyweight
European Championships
Silver medal – second place	2011 Rotterdam	Bantamweight
Bronze medal – third place	2016 Sofia	Flyweight
EU Championships
Silver medal – second place	2011 Katowice	Bantamweight
Bronze medal – third place	2013 Keszthely	Flyweight
World Military Boxing Championships
Bronze medal – third place	2021 Moscow	Flyweight

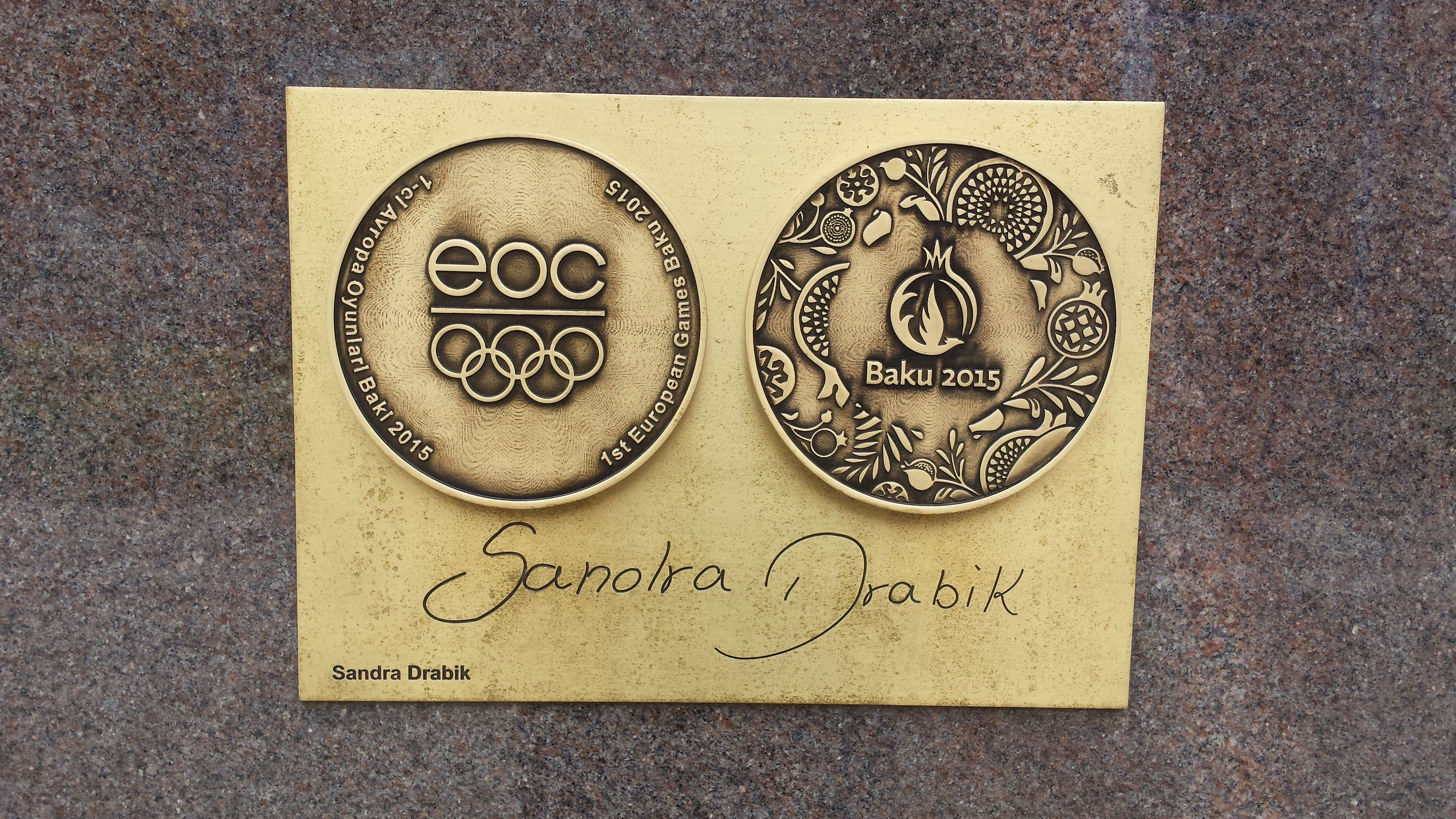
Drabik's medal, 2015 European Games

Sandra Drabik (born 13 August 1988, in Kielce) is a Polish boxer. She won the silver medal in the women's 51 kg event at the 2015 European Games and one of the bronze medals in that event at the 2019 European Games.

In 2011, she won the silver medal at the 2011 Women's European Union Amateur Boxing Championships in the women's 54 kg event. A few months later she also won the silver medal in the 2011 Women's European Amateur Boxing Championships in the women's 54 kg event.

In 2016, she won one of the bronze medals in the women's 51 kg event at the 2016 Women's European Amateur Boxing Championships.

She competed in the women's flyweight event at the 2020 Summer Olympics held in Tokyo, Japan.

She is Jan Kochanowski University alumni.
