= Pinki Jangra =

Indian boxer (born 1990)

- Jangra in CWG 2014

Personal information
- Full name: Pinki Rani Jangra
- Nationality: Indian
- Born: 28 April 1990 (age 36)
- Weight: 51 kg (112 lb)

Sport
- Sport: Boxing (48kg, 51kg)
Medal record
Representing India
Commonwealth Games
Bronze medal – third place	2014 Glasgow Scotland	(51kg)
International Medals
Gold medal – first place	2018 New Delhi	48−51 kg
Gold medal – first place	2015 Indonesia	48−51 kg
Bronze medal – third place	2014 Glasgow	48−51 kg
Silver medal – second place	2012 Mongolia	45−48 kg
Gold medal – first place	2011 Australia	48−51 kg
South Asian Games
Gold medal – first place	2019 Kathmandu–Pokhara	51 kg

Pinki Rani Jangra (born 28 April 1990) is a flyweight Indian boxer from Hisar, Haryana and a four time national champion. She won bronze medal in the 2014 Commonwealth Games. She won gold medal at the President's Cup International Boxing in Palembang, South Sumatra, Indonesia, in 2015. She won gold medals at the 2011 National Games of India and the 2012 and 2014 National championships in the flyweight (51 kg) division. She was the only Indian pugilist who bagged the gold medal at the Arafura Games. She signed up with Sporty Boxing Private Limited, which is referred to as the commercial arm of the Indian Boxing Council (IBC), the licensing body for professional boxers in India.

Jangra is known as Giant Killer due to her achievements in domestic competitions. She has defeated London Olympic Games bronze medalist and six-time world champion Mary Kom in National Boxing Championship 2009 and CWG 2014 qualification trial, as well as five-time Asian champion and world champion Laishram Sarita Devi in National Games and National Boxing Championship 2011.

Jangra represented India in Boxing at the 2018 Commonwealth Games in 51 kg weight category. However, she lost to England's Lisa Whiteside in her quarterfinal bout.

== Personal life ==
Jangra was born on 28 April 1990 in Hisar, Haryana. She is the daughter of a homemaker Prem Devi and a government official Krishan Kumar. She studied till 12th grade and reminisces her hobbies as dancing, playing and boxing. She married Dipankar Dhariwal, an IIM graduate in March 2023 in Chandigarh. She was initially coached by Raj Singh and later switched to Anoop Kumar.

== International achievements ==
Year	Medal	Weight	Competition	Location
2019	Gold	51	2019 South Asian Games	Kathmandu/Pokhara
2018	Gold	51	India Open Boxing Tournament	New Delhi
2015	Gold	51	22nd President's Cup Open International Tournament	Palembang, Indonesia
2014	Quarter-Finalist	51	8th Women's AIBA World Boxing Championships	South Korea
2014	Bronze	51	XX Commonwealth Games	Glasgow, Scotland
2014	Silver	51	3rd Nations Cup	Serbia
2012	Silver	48	6th Asian Women Boxing Championship	Mongolia
2011	Gold(Best Boxer)	51	Arafura Games	Darwin, Australia
2010	Gold(Best Boxer)	48	India-Sri Lanka Duel Boxing Championship	Sri Lanka

== National achievements ==
- All India Inter-Railway Boxing Championship, Bilaspur, Gold in Feb, 2015
- 1st Monnet Women Elite National Boxing Championship, Raipur, Gold in 2014
- All India Inter-Railway Boxing Championships, Agra, Gold in March 2014
- 13th Senior Women's National Boxing Championship, Guwahati, Gold in Nov, 2012
- 10th Senior Women National Boxing Championship at J.R.D. Tata Sports Complex, Jamshedpur, Silver in October, 2009
- 34th National Games (Women Boxing), Jamshedpur, Gold in 2011

== Records ==
- Federation Cup Women Boxing Championship, Erode, Tamil Nadu, 2009
- N.C. Sharma Memorial Federation Cup Women Boxing Championship, Nainital, Gold in November, 2009
- S.H.N.C. Sharma Memorial Federation Cup Women Boxing Championship, Uttarakhand, Gold in 2010-11
- 9th Senior Women Haryana State Boxing Championship, Panipat, Gold in 2010
- 10th Senior Women Haryana State Boxing Championship, Mehandergarh, Gold in 2011
- 7th Senior Women North India Boxing Championship, Himachal Pradesh, Gold in 2012
- 4th Inter-Zonal Women National Boxing Championship, Vishakhpatnam, Gold in 2012
