= Tetyana Kob =

Ukrainian boxer (born 1987)

Personal information
- Nationality: Ukrainian
- Born: 25 October 1987 (age 38)

Sport
- Sport: Boxing
Medal record
Women's amateur boxing
Representing Ukraine
World Championships
Bronze medal – third place	2010 Bridgetown	Flyweight
European Championships
Gold medal – first place	2009 Mykolaiv	Flyweight
Gold medal – first place	2022 Budva	Flyweight
Silver medal – second place	2016 Sofia	Flyweight
Bronze medal – third place	2019 Alcobendas	Flyweight

Tetyana Kob (Ukrainian: Тетяна Коб, also transliterated Tetiana, born 25 October 1987) is a Ukrainian female boxer.

She competed at the 2016 Summer Olympics in Rio de Janeiro, in the women's flyweight.
