= Philippines national amateur boxing athletes =

The national amateur boxing athletes of the Philippines represent the country and compete in regional, continental and international matches and tournaments sanctioned by the International Boxing Association (AIBA). Christopher Cain will be the training and conditioning consultant of the ABAP.

== Boxers ==
1992 Manny Pacquiao began his amateur career with an amateur record of 64(4 - 60 - 0KO )fights before turning pro in 1995.

== Olympics ==
=== List of medalists ===
The country has harvested 4 silvers and 4 bronzes in Olympic boxing.

=== 2004 Athens Olympics ===
Four Filipino boxers attended the 2004 Summer Olympics. Two lost their first bouts while the other two survived until the second rounds. The team's combined record was 2-4.

==== Entry list ====
- Harry Tañamor (Light Flyweight)
- Violito Payla (Flyweight)
- Romeo Brin (Light Welterweight)
- Christopher Camat (Middleweight)

=== 2008 Beijing Olympics ===
One Filipino boxer attended the 2008 Summer Olympics.

==== Entry list ====
- Harry Tañamor (Light Flyweight)

== List of Olympic Men's medalists ==
No.	Name	Event	Medal
1	José Villanueva	1932 Los Angeles Olympics Men's Bantamweight	Bronze Medal
2	Anthony Villanueva	1964 Tokyo Olympics Men's Featherweight	Silver Medal
3	Leopoldo Serantes	1988 Seoul Olympics Men's Light Flyweight	Bronze Medal
4	Roel Velasco	1992 Barcelona Olympics Men's Light Flyweight	Bronze Medal
5	Mansueto Velasco	1996 Atlanta Olympics Men's Light Flyweight	Silver Medal
6	Eumir Marcial	2020 Tokyo Olympics Men's Middleweight	Bronze Medal
7	Carlo Paalam	2020 Tokyo Olympics Men's Flyweight	Silver Medal

Gold	Silver	Bronze	Total
0	3	4	7

== List of AIBA World Boxing Championships medalists ==
No.	Name	Event	Medal
1	Roel Velasco	1997 Budapest Men's Light flyweight	Silver Medal
2	Harry Tañamor	2001 Belfast Men's Light flyweight	Bronze Medal
3	Harry Tañamor	2003 Bangkok Men's Light flyweight	Bronze Medal
4	Harry Tañamor	2007 Chicago Men's Light flyweight	Silver Medal
5	Rogen Ladon	2015 Doha Men's Light flyweight	Bronze Medal
6	Eumir Marcial	2019 Yekaterinburg Men's Middleweight	Silver Medal

Gold	Silver	Bronze	Total
0	3	3	6

== List of AIBA Asian Olympic Qualifying Tournament medalists ==
No.	Name	Event	Medal
1	Harry Tanamor	2004 Karachi Men's Light flyweight	Silver Medal
2	Christopher Feros *	2004 Karachi Men's Welterweight	Bronze Medal
3	Charly Suarez *	2012 Astana Men's Lightweight	Silver Medal
4	Rogen Ladon	2016 Qian'an Men's Light flyweight	Silver Medal
5	Mario Fernandez *	2016 Qian'an Men's Bantamweight	Bronze Medal
6	Charly Suarez	2016 Qian'an Men's Lightweight	Silver Medal
7	Eumir Felix Marcial *	2016 Qian'an Men's Welterweight	Bronze Medal
8	Eumir Felix Marcial	2020 Amman Men's Middleweight	Gold Medal

(*) Did not qualify for Olympics.

Gold	Silver	Bronze	Total
1	4	3	8

== List of Asian Games medalists ==
No.	Name	Event	Medal
1	Vicente Tunacao	1954 Manila Men's Light Middleweight	Gold Medal
2	Ernesto Porto	1954 Manila Men's Light Welterweight	Gold Medal
3	Celedonio Espinosa	1954 Manila Men's Lightweight	Gold Medal
4	Mauro Dizon	1954 Manila Men's Featherweight	Silver Medal
5	Alejandro Ortuoste	1954 Manila Men's Bantamweight	Gold Medal
6	Ernesto Sajo	1954 Manila Men's Flyweight	Gold Medal
7	Jacinto Diaz	1958 Tokyo Men's Bantamweight	Bronze Medal
8	Dionisio Guevarra	1958 Tokyo Men's Featherweight	Silver Medal
9	Celedonio Espinosa	1958 Tokyo Men's Lightweight	Bronze Medal
10	Jose Ramirez	1962 Jakarta Men's Bantamweight	Bronze Medal
11	Egino Grafia	1962 Jakarta Men's Featherweight	Bronze Medal
12	Catalino Arpon	1962 Jakarta Men's Lightweight	Bronze Medal
13	Manfredo Alipala	1962 Jakarta Men's Welterweight	Gold Medal
14	Rudy Diaz	1966 Bangkok Men's Light flyweight	Bronze Medal
15	Rodolfo Arpon	1966 Bangkok Men's Lightweight	Gold Medal
16	Felix Ocampo	1966 Bangkok Men's Light middleweight	Bronze Medal
17	Bernardo Belleza	1966 Bangkok Men's Middleweight	Bronze Medal
18	Manolo Vicera	1970 Bangkok Men's Light flyweight	Silver Medal
19	Ricardo Fortaleza	1970 Bangkok Men's Bantamweight	Gold Medal
20	Nemesio Gonzaga	1970 Bangkok Men's Featherweight	Bronze Medal
21	Eugenio Valmocina	1970 Bangkok Men's Light welterweight	Bronze Medal
22	Nicolas Aquilino	1970 Bangkok Men's Light wmiddleweight	Bronze Medal
23	Willie Lucas	1974 Tehran Men's Featherweight	Bronze Medal
24	Nicolas Aquilino	1974 Tehran Men's Light middleweight	Bronze Medal
25	Ruben Mares	1978 Bangkok Men's Lightweight	Silver Medal
26	Efren Tabanas	1982 New Delhi Men's Light flyweight	Silver Medal
27	Fernando de Assis	1982 New Delhi Men's Lightweight	Bronze Medal
28	Raymundo Suico	1982 New Delhi Men's Welterweight	Bronze Medal
29	Brix Flores	1986 Seoul Men's Bantamweight	Bronze Medal
30	Leopoldo Cantancio	1986 Seoul Men's Lightweight	Silver Medal
31	Ernesto Coronel	1986 Seoul Men's Lightweight	Bronze Medal
32	Elias Recaido	1990 Beijing Men's Light flyweight	Bronze Medal
33	Roberto Jalnaiz	1990 Beijing Men's Bantamweight	Gold Medal
34	Leopoldo Cantancio	1990 Beijing Men's Lightweight	Bronze Medal
35	Arlo Chavez	1990 Beijing Men's Light welterweight	Bronze Medal
36	Mansueto Velasco	1994 Hiroshima Men's Light flyweight	Gold Medal
37	Elias Recaido	1994 Hiroshima Men's Flyweight	Gold Medal
38	Anthony Igusquisa	1994 Hiroshima Men's Bantamweight	Bronze Medal
39	Eric Canoy	1994 Hiroshima Men's Featherweight	Bronze Medal
40	Reynaldo Galido	1994 Hiroshima Men's Light welterweight	Gold Medal
41	Eric Canoy	1998 Bangkok Men's Featherweight	Bronze Medal
42	Harry Tañamor	2002 Busan Men's Light flyweight	Silver Medal
43	Godfrey Castro	2006 Doha Men's Light flyweight	Bronze Medal
44	Violito Payla	2006 Doha Men's Flyweight	Gold Medal
45	Joan Tipon	2006 Doha Men's Bantamweight	Gold Medal
46	Genebert Basadre	2006 Doha Men's Lightweight	Bronze Medal
47	Victorio Saludar	2010 Guangzhou Men's Light flyweight	Bronze Medal
48	Rey Saludar	2010 Guangzhou Men's Flyweight	Gold Medal
49	Mark Anthony Barriga	2014 Incheon Men's Light flyweight	Bronze Medal
50	Mario Fernandez	2014 Incheon Men's Bantamweight	Bronze Medal
51	Charly Suarez	2014 Incheon Men's Lightweight	Silver Medal
52	Wilfredo Lopez	2014 Incheon Men's Middleweight	Bronze Medal
53	Carlo Paalam	2018 Jakarta Men's Light flyweight	Bronze Medal
54	Rogen Ladon	2018 Jakarta Men's Light flyweight	Silver Medal
55	Eumir Marcial	2018 Jakarta Men's Middleweight	Bronze Medal
56	Eumir Marcial	2022 Hangzhou Men's Middleweight	Silver Medal

Gold	Silver	Bronze	Total
15	10	31	56

== List of Asian Amateur Boxing Championships medalists ==
No.	Name	Event	Medal
1	Roel Velasco	1992 Bangkok Men's Lightweight	Gold Medal
2	Roberto Jalnaiz	1992 Bangkok Men's Bantamweight	Bronze Medal
3	Ronald Chavez	1992 Bangkok Men's Lightweight	Gold Medal
4	Danilo Lerio	1999 Tashkent Men's Light flyweight	Bronze Medal
5	Arlan Lerio	1999 Tashkent Men's Flyweight	Silver Medal
6	Larry Semillano	1999 Tashkent Men's Lightweight	Silver Medal
7	Lhyven Salazar	2002 Seremban Men's Light flyweight	Silver Medal
8	Ferdie Gamo	2002 Seremban Men's Bantamweight	Bronze Medal
9	Violito Payla	2004 Puerto Princesa Men's Flyweight	Gold Medal
10	Romeo Brin	2004 Puerto Princesa Men's Light welterweight	Gold Medal
11	Christopher Camat	2004 Puerto Princesa Men's Middleweight	Silver Medal
12	Harry Tañamor	2005 Ho Chi Minh Men's Light flyweight	Gold Medal
13	Joan Tipon	2005 Ho Chi Minh Men's Bantamweight	Gold Medal
14	Mark Melligen	2005 Ho Chi Minh Men's Light welterweight	Bronze Medal
15	Rey Saludar	2011 Incheon Men's Flyweight	Bronze Medal
16	Rogen Ladon	2015 Bangkok Men's Light flyweight	Silver Medal
17	Eumir Felix Marcial	2015 Bangkok Men's Welterweight	Silver Medal
18	Rogen Ladon	2017 Tashkent Men's Light flyweight	Bronze Medal
19	Dannel Maamo	2017 Tashkent Men's Flyweight	Bronze Medal
20	Ian Clark Bautista	2019 Bangkok Men's Bantamweight	Bronze Medal
21	John Marvin	2019 Bangkok Men's Flyweight	Silver Medal
22	Mark Lester Durens	2021 Dubai Men's Light flyweight	Bronze Medal
23	Junmilardo Ogayre	2021 Dubai Men's Bantamweight	Bronze Medal
24	Eumir Marcial	2021 Dubai Men's Middleweight	Bronze Medal
25	Carlo Paalam	2022 Amman Men's Bantamweight	Gold Medal
26	Jay Bryan Baricuatro	2024 Chiang Mai Men's Light flyweight	Bronze Medal
27	Marvin Tabamo	2024 Chiang Mai Men's Flyweight	Silver Medal
28	Ian Clark Bautista	2024 Chiang Mai Men's Featherweight	Bronze Medal
29	Mark Ashley Fajardo	2024 Chiang Mai Men's Light welterweight	Bronze Medal

Gold	Silver	Bronze	Total
7	8	14	29

== List of SEA Games medalists ==
No.	Name	Event	Medal
1	Nelson Jamili	1983 Singapore Men's Pinweight	Gold Medal
2	Efren Tabanas	1983 Singapore Men's Flyweight	Gold Medal
3	Leopoldo Cantancio	1983 Singapore Men's Bantamweight	Gold Medal
4	Raymundo Suico	1983 Singapore Men's Light Middleweight	Gold Medal
5	Patricio Gaspi	1983 Singapore Men's Lightweight	Bronze Medal
6	Leopoldo Serrantes	1983 Singapore Men's Light flyweight	Bronze Medal
7	Nelson Jamili	1985 Bangkok Men's Pinweight	Bronze Medal
8	Leopoldo Serantes	1985 Bangkok Men's Light flyweight	Gold Medal
9	Orlando Tacuyan	1985 Bangkok Men's Flyweight	Silver Medal
10	Ruben Mares	1985 Bangkok Men's Lightweight	Silver Medal
11	Alfredo Trazona	1985 Bangkok Men's Welterweight	Bronze Medal
12	Ernesto Coronel	1985 Bangkok Men's Light middleweight	Silver Medal
13	Ramon Napagao	1985 Bangkok Men's Middleweight	Bronze Medal
14	Isidro Vicera	1989 Malaysia Men's Flyweight	Gold Medal
15	Arlo Chavez	1989 Malaysia Men's Light Welterweight	Gold Medal
16	Raymundo Suico	1989 Malaysia Men's Light Heavyweight	Gold Medal
17	Patricio Gaspi	1989 Malaysia Men's Middleweight	Silver Medal
18	Emmanuel Legaspi	1989 Malaysia Men's Super Middleweight	Silver Medal
19	Roel Velasco	1989 Malaysia Men's Minimumweight	Bronze Medal
20	Ronald Chavez	1989 Malaysia Men's Featherweight	Bronze Medal
21	Nonito Arquisa	1989 Malaysia Men's Welterweight	Bronze Medal
22	Gregorio Caliwan	1989 Malaysia Men's Heavyweight	Bronze Medal
23	Arlo Chavez	1995 Thailand Men's Welterweight	Gold Medal
24	Juanito Magliquian	1995 Thailand Men's Mnimumweight	Silver Medal
25	Elias Recaido	1995 Thailand Men's Flyweight	Silver Medal
26	Virgilio Vicera	1995 Thailand Men's Bantamweight	Silver Medal
27	Eric Canoy	1995 Thailand Men's Featherweight	Silver Medal
28	Reynaldo Galido	1995 Thailand Men's Super Lightweight	Silver Medal
29	Ernesto Coronel	1995 Thailand Men's Heavyweight	Silver Medal
30	Efren Desierto	1995 Thailand Men's Minimumweight	Bronze Medal
31	Ramil Zambales	1995 Thailand Men's Super Featherweight	Bronze Medal
32	Jon-Jon Tamayo	1995 Thailand Men's Middleweight	Bronze Medal
33	Mario Tizon	1995 Thailand Men's Super Middleweight	Bronze Medal
34	Emmanuel Legaspi	1995 Thailand Men's Light Heavyweight	Bronze Medal
35	Junie Tizon	1997 Indonesia Men's Super Welterweight	Silver Medal
36	Ernesto Coronel	1997 Indonesia Men's Light Heavyweight	Silver Medal
36	Larry Semillano	1997 Indonesia Men's Light Heavyweight	Gold Medal
37	Juanito Magliquian	1999 Brunei Men's Minimumweight	Gold Medal
38	Romeo Brin	1999 Brunei Men's Super Lightweight	Gold Medal
39	Arlan Lerio	1999 Brunei Men's Flyweight	Silver Medal
40	Elmer Pamisa	1999 Brunei Men's Featherweight	Silver Medal
41	Mario Tizon	1999 Brunei Men's Super Middleweight	Silver Medal
42	Jessie Flores	1999 Brunei Men's Welterweight	Bronze Medal
43	Junie Tizon	1999 Brunei Men's Super Welterweight	Bronze Medal
44	Ernesto Coronel	1999 Brunei Men's Light Heavyweight	Bronze Medal
45	Violito Payla	2001 Negeri Sembilan Men's Flyweight	Bronze Medal
46	Arlan S. Lerio	2001 Negeri Sembilan Men's Bantamweight	Silver Medal
47	Ramil U. Zambales	2001 Negeri Sembilan Men's Featherweight	Silver Medal
48	Larry I. Semillano	2001 Negeri Sembilan Men's Lightweight	Bronze Medal
49	Romeo Brin	2001 Negeri Sembilan Men's Light welterweight	Bronze Medal
50	Reynaldo L. Galido	2001 Negeri Sembilan Men's Welterweight	Bronze Medal
51	Maximino Tabangcora	2001 Negeri Sembilan Men's Middleweight	Bronze Medal
52	Christopher Camat	2003 Vietnam Men's Super Middleweight	Bronze Medal
53	Juanito Magliquian	2003 Vietnam Men's Minimunweight	Silver Medal
54	Joan Tipon	2003 Vietnam Men's Bantamweight	Silver Medal
55	Roel Laguna	2003 Vietnam Men's Featherweight	Silver Medal
56	Florencio Ferrer	2003 Vietnam Men's Lightweight	Silver Medal
57	Mark Jason Melligen	2003 Vietnam Men's Super Lightweight	Silver Medal
58	Harry Tañamor	2003 Vietnam Men's Light Flyweight	Gold Medal
59	Juanito Magliquian Jr.	2005 Bacolod Men's Pinweight	Gold Medal
60	Harry Tañamor	2005 Bacolod Men's Light flyweight	Gold Medal
61	Warlito Parrenas	2005 Bacolod Men's Flyweight	Bronze Medal
62	Joan Tipon	2005 Bacolod Men's Bantamweight	Gold Medal
63	Joegin Ladon	2005 Bacolod Men's Featherweight	Silver Medal
64	Genebert Basadre	2005 Bacolod Men's Lightweight	Gold Medal
65	Romeo Brin	2005 Bacolod Men's Light welterweight	Silver Medal
66	Mark Jason Melligen	2005 Bacolod Men's Welterweight	Silver Medal
67	Reynaldo Galido	2005 Bacolod Men's Middleweight	Silver Medal
68	Bill Vicente Vicera	2007 Amphoe Pak Thong Chai Men's Pinweight	Bronze Medal
69	Albert Pabila	2007 Amphoe Pak Thong Chai Men's Light flyweight	Bronze Medal
70	Godfrey Castro	2007 Amphoe Pak Thong Chai Men's Flyweight	Silver Medal
71	Junel Cantancio	2007 Amphoe Pak Thong Chai Men's Bantamweight	Silver Medal
72	Orlando Tacuyan, Jr.	2007 Amphoe Pak Thong Chai Men's Featherweight	Silver Medal
73	Joegin Ladon	2007 Amphoe Pak Thong Chai Men's Lightweight	Silver Medal
74	Larry Semillano	2007 Amphoe Pak Thong Chai Men's Light welterweight	Silver Medal
75	Junie Tizon	2007 Amphoe Pak Thong Chai Men's Middleweight	Silver Medal
76	Maximino Tabangcora	2007 Amphoe Pak Thong Chai Men's Light heavyweight	Silver Medal
77	Bill Vicera	2009 Vientiane Men's Pinweight	Gold Medal
78	Harry Tanamor	2009 Vientiane Men's Light flyweight	Silver Medal
79	Rey Saludar	2009 Vientiane Men's Flyweight	Bronze Medal
80	Charly Suarez	2009 Vientiane Men's Featherweight	Gold Medal
81	Joegin Landon	2009 Vientiane Men's Light welterweight	Bronze Medal
82	Rey Saludar	2011 Jakarta Men's Flyweight	Bronze Medal
83	Charly Suarez	2011 Jakarta Men's Lightweight	Gold Medal
84	Dennis Galvan	2011 Jakarta Men's Light welterweight	Gold Medal
85	Mark Anthony Barriga	2013 Naypyidaw Men's Light flyweight	Gold Medal
86	Rey Saludar	2013 Naypyidaw Men's Flyweight	Bronze Medal
87	Mario Fernandez	2013 Naypyidaw Men's Bantamweight	Gold Medal
88	Junel Cantancio	2013 Naypyidaw Men's Lightweight	Silver Medal
89	Dennis Galvan	2013 Naypyidaw Men's Light welterweight	Silver Medal
90	Wilfredo Lopez	2013 Naypyidaw Men's Middleweight	Silver Medal
91	Rogen Ladon	2015 Singapore Men's Light flyweight	Silver Medal
92	Ian Clark Bautista	2015 Singapore Men's Flyweight	Gold Medal
93	Mario Fernandez	2015 Singapore Men's Bantamweight	Gold Medal
94	Junel Cantancio	2015 Singapore Men's Lightweight	Gold Medal
95	Eumir Felix Marcial	2015 Singapore Men's Welterweight	Gold Medal
96	Wilfredo Lopez	2015 Singapore Men's Middleweight	Bronze Medal
97	Ian Clark Bautista	2017 Kuala Lumpur Men's Flyweight	Bronze Medal
98	Mario Fernandez	2017 Kuala Lumpur Men's Bantamweight	Silver Medal
99	Charly Suarez	2017 Kuala Lumpur Men's Light welterweight	Bronze Medal
100	Eumir Felix Marcial	2017 Kuala Lumpur Men's Middleweight	Gold Medal
101	John Marvin	2017 Kuala Lumpur Men's Light heavyweight	Gold Medal
102	Carlo Paalam	2019 Pasay Men's Light flyweight	Gold Medal
103	Rogen Ladon	2019 Pasay Men's Flyweight	Gold Medal
104	Ian Bautista	2019 Pasay Men's Bantamweight	Bronze Medal
105	Charly Suarez	2019 Pasay Men's Lightweight	Gold Medal
106	James Palicte	2019 Pasay Men's Light welterweight	Gold Medal
107	Marjon Piañar	2019 Pasay Men's Welterweight	Silver Medal
108	Eumir Marcial	2019 Pasay Men's Middleweight	Gold Medal
109	Rogen Ladon	2021 Bắc Ninh Men's Flyweight	Gold Medal
110	Ian Clark Bautista	2021 Bắc Ninh Men's Bantamweight	Gold Medal
111	James Palicte	2021 Bắc Ninh Men's Lightweight	Bronze Medal
112	Marjon Piañar	2021 Bắc Ninh Men's Welterweight	Bronze Medal
113	Eumir Felix Marcial	2021 Bắc Ninh Men's Middleweight	Gold Medal
114	Rogen Ladon	2023 Phnom Penh Men's Flyweight	Silver Medal
115	Carlo Paalam	2023 Phnom Penh Men's Bantamweight	Gold Medal
116	Ian Clark Bautista	2023 Phnom Penh Men's Featherweight	Gold Medal
117	Paul Bascon	2023 Phnom Penh Men's Lightweight	Gold Medal
118	Norlan Petecio	2023 Phnom Penh Men's Welterweight	Silver Medal
119	John Marvin	2023 Phnom Penh Men's Light heavyweight	Silver Medal
120	Markus Tongco	2023 Phnom Penh Men's Heavyweight	Bronze Medal
121	Jay Bryan Baricuatro	2025 Bangkok Men's Light Flyweight	Silver Medal
122	Flint Jara	2025 Bangkok Men's Bantamweight	Silver Medal
123	Mark Ashley Fajardo	2025 Bangkok Men's Welterweight	Bronze Medal
124	Weljon Mindoro	2025 Bangkok Men's Middleweight	Bronze Medal
125	Eumir Marcial	2025 Bangkok Men's Light heavyweight	Gold Medal

== List of AIBA Youth World Championships medalists ==
=== World Junior / Youth Championship (17-19 years) ===
No.	Name	Event	Medal
1	Renato Angora	1987 Havana Men's Light welterweight	Bronze Medal
2	Jade Bornea	2012 Yerevan Men's Light flyweight	Bronze Medal
3	Carlo Paalam	2016 Saint Petersburg Men's Light flyweight	Bronze Medal
4	Criztian Pitt Laurente	2018 Budapest Men's Bantamweight	Bronze Medal
5	Ronel Suyom	2022 La Nucia Men's Minimumweight	Silver Medal

Gold	Silver	Bronze	Total
0	1	4	5

=== World Cadet / Junior Championship (15-17 years) ===
No.	Name	Event	Medal
1	Eumir Felix Marcial	2011 Astana Men's Welterweight	Gold Medal

Gold	Silver	Bronze	Total
1	0	0	1

== List of Olympic medalists ==
No.	Name	Event	Medal
1	Nesthy Petecio	2020 Tokyo Olympics Women's Featherweight	Silver Medal

Gold	Silver	Bronze	Total
0	1	0	1

== List of AIBA Women's World Amateur Boxing Championships medalists ==
No.	Name	Event	Medal
1	Gretchen Abaniel	2005 Podolsk Women's Pinweight	Bronze Medal
2	Martinez Mitchel	2005 Podolsk Women's Lightweight	Bronze Medal
3	Alice Kate Aparri	2006 New Delhi Women's Light flyweight	Bronze Medal
4	Mitchel Martinez	2006 New Delhi Women's Lightweight	Bronze Medal
5	Josie Gabuco	2008 Ningbo Women's Pinweight	Bronze Medal
6	Analisa Cruz	2008 Ningbo Women's Flyweight	Bronze Medal
7	Annie Albania	2008 Ningbo Women's Super flyweight	Silver Medal
8	Alice Kate Aparri	2010 Bridgetown Women's Pinweight	Bronze Medal
9	Josie Gabuco	2012 Qinhuangdao Women's Light flyweight	Gold Medal
10	Nesthy Petecio	2014 Jeju City Women's Featherweight	Silver Medal
11	Nesthy Petecio	2019 Ulan-Ude Women's Featherweight	Gold Medal

Gold	Silver	Bronze	Total
1	2	7	10

== List of Asian Games medalists ==
No.	Name	Event	Medal
1	Annie Albania	2010 Guangzhou Women's Flyweight	Silver Medal

== List of Asian Amateur Boxing Championships medalists ==
No.	Name	Event	Medal
1	Alice Kate Aparri	2001 Bangkok Women's Pinweight	Bronze Medal
2	Librada Tamson	2001 Bangkok Women's Light flyweight	Bronze Medal
3	Jouvilet Chilem	2001 Bangkok Women's Featherweight	Bronze Medal
4	Rosie Villarito	2001 Bangkok Women's Lightweight	Bronze Medal
5	Mitchel Martinez	2001 Bangkok Women's Light welterweight	Gold Medal
6	Gretchen Abaniel	2005 Kaohsiung Women's Pinweight	Silver Medal
7	Annalisa Cruz	2005 Kaohsiung Women's Super flyweight	Silver Medal
8	Mitchel Martinez	2005 Kaohsiung Women's Lightweight	Gold Medal
9	Alice Kate Aparri	2010 Astana Women's Light flyweight	Bronze Medal
10	Alice Kate Aparri	2012 Ulan Baatar Women's Flyweight	Bronze Medal
11	Nesthy Petecio	2012 Ulan Baatar Women's Bantamweight	Bronze Medal
12	Nesthy Petecio	2015 Wulanchabu Women's Bantamweight	Silver Medal
13	Josie Gabuco	2019 Bangkok Women's Light Flyweight	Gold Medal
14	Josie Gabuco	2021 Dubai Women's Light Flyweight	Bronze Medal
15	Nesthy Petecio	2022 Amman Women's Featherweight	Bronze Medal
16	Hergie Bacyadan	2022 Amman Women's Middleweight	Bronze Medal

Gold	Silver	Bronze	Total
3	3	7	13

== List of SEA Games medalists ==
No.	Name	Event	Medal
1	Alice Kate Aparri	2005 Bacolod Women's Pinweight	Gold Medal
2	Analiza Cruz	2005 Bacolod Women's Light flyweight	Bronze Medal
3	Annie Albania	2005 Bacolod Women's Flyweight	Gold Medal
4	Jouvilet Chilem	2005 Bacolod Women's Bantamweight	Gold Medal
5	Mitchel Martinez	2005 Bacolod Women's Lightweight	Gold Medal
6	Alice Kate Aparri	2007 Amphoe Pak Thong Chai Women's Light flyweight	Silver Medal
7	Annie Albania	2007 Amphoe Pak Thong Chai Women's Flyweight	Gold Medal
8	Annalisa Cruz	2007 Amphoe Pak Thong Chai Women's Super flyweight	Silver Medal
9	Jouveliet Chilem	2007 Amphoe Pak Thong Chai Women's Bantamweight	Silver Medal
10	Ronijen Sofla	2007 Amphoe Pak Thong Chai Women's Featherweight	Silver Medal
11	Mitchel Martinez	2007 Amphoe Pak Thong Chai Women's Lightweight	Silver Medal
12	Josie Gabuco	2009 Vientiane Women's Pinweight	Gold Medal
13	Alice Kate Aparri	2009 Vientiane Women's Light flyweight	Gold Medal
14	Albania Annie	2009 Vientiane Women's Flyweight	Gold Medal
15	Mitchel Matinez	2009 Vientiane Women's Featherweight	Bronze Medal
16	Josie Gabuco	2011 Palembang Women's Pinweight	Gold Medal
17	Alice Kate Aparri	2011 Palembang Women's Light flyweight	Gold Medal
18	Nesthy Petecio	2011 Palembang Women's Bantamweight	Silver Medal
19	Josie Gabuco	2013 Naypyidaw Women's Light flyweight	Gold Medal
20	Maircris Igram	2013 Naypyidaw Women's Flyweight	Bronze Medal
21	Irish Magno	2013 Naypyidaw Women's Super flyweight	Bronze Medal
22	Nesthy Petecio	2013 Naypyidaw Women's Featherweight	Silver Medal
23	Josie Gabuco	2015 Singapore Women's Light flyweight	Gold Medal
24	Irish Magno	2015 Singapore Women's Flyweight	Silver Medal
25	Nesthy Petecio	2015 Singapore Women's Bantamweight	Silver Medal
26	Riza Pasuit	2015 Singapore Women's Featherweight	Bronze Medal
27	Josie Gabuco	2019 Pasay Women's Light flyweight	Gold Medal
28	Irish Magno	2019 Pasay Women's Flyweight	Silver Medal
29	Aira Villegas	2019 Pasay Women's Bantamweight	Bronze Medal
30	Nesthy Petecio	2019 Pasay Women's Featherweight	Gold Medal
31	Riza Pasuit	2019 Pasay Women's Lightweight	Silver Medal
32	Josie Gabuco	2021 Bắc Ninh Women's Light flyweight	Bronze Medal
33	Irish Magno	2021 Bắc Ninh Women's Flyweight	Silver Medal
34	Riza Pasuit	2021 Bắc Ninh Featherweight	Bronze Medal
35	Nesthy Petecio	2021 Bắc Ninh Lightweight	Bronze Medal
36	Irish Magno	2023 Phnom Penh Bantamweight	Silver Medal
37	Nesthy Petecio	2023 Phnom Penh Featherweight	Gold Medal
38	Riza Pasuit	2023 Phnom Penh Light welterweight	Silver Medal

== List of Asian Indoor Games Medalists ==
No.	Name	Event	Medal
1	Josie Gabuco	2009 Hanoi Women's Pinweight	Bronze Medal
2	Annie Albania	2009 Hanoi Women's Flyweight	Gold Medal
3	Mitchel Martinez	2009 Hanoi Women's Featherweight	Silver Medal

== See also ==
- Association of Boxing Alliances in the Philippines
- List of Olympic medalists for the Philippines
