= Saweety Boora =

Indian boxer

Saweety Boora boxer
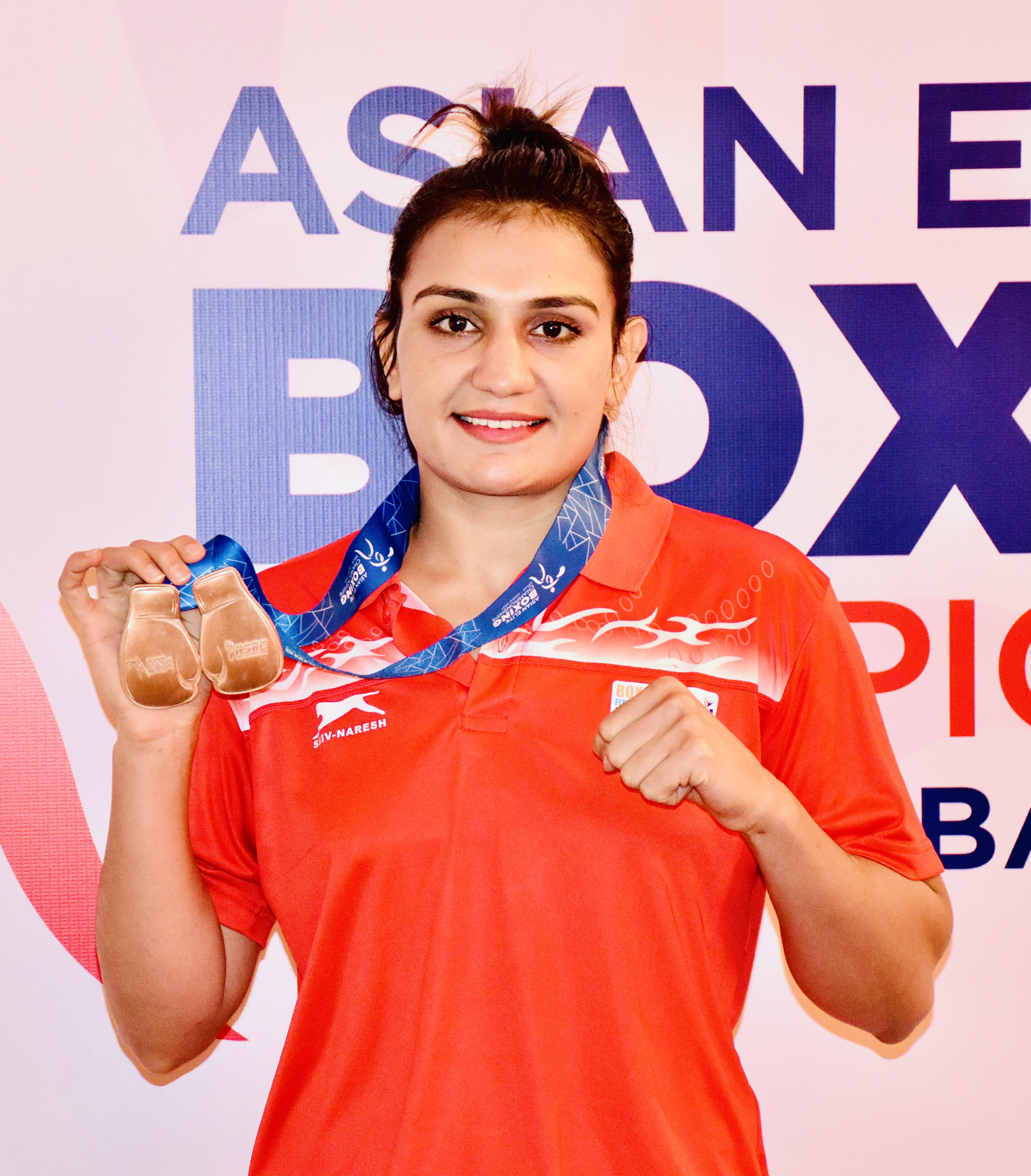

Personal information
- Nationality: Indian
- Born: 10 January 1993 (age 33) Hisar, Haryana, India

Sport
- Sport: Boxing
- Weight class: Middleweight (75 kg)
Medal record
Women's amateur boxing
Representing India
World Championships
Gold medal – first place	2023 New Delhi	Light heavyweight
Silver medal – second place	2014 Jeju City	Light heavyweight
Asian Championships
Gold medal – first place	2022 Amman	Light heavyweight
Silver medal – second place	2015 Wulanchabu	Light heavyweight
Bronze medal – third place	2021 Dubai	Light heavyweight

Saweety Boora, also known mononymously as Saweety, is an Indian boxer who competes in the middleweight weight class. She won the gold medal at 2023 IBA Women's World Boxing Championships and silver medal class at the 2014 AIBA Women's World Boxing Championships in the light heavyweight category.

== Early and personal life ==
Boora was born on 10 January 1993 in rural Hisar, Haryana. Her father Mahender Singh, a farmer, played basketball at the national level. Boora was a state-level kabaddi player before switching to boxing in 2009 at the insistence of her father. She initially trained in the farmlands near Chaudhary Charan Singh Haryana Agricultural University and had to move out of Haryana in order to pursue a career in the sport. Her younger sister Siwi Boora also took up boxing.

On 7 July 2022, Boora married Deepak Niwas Hooda.

== Career ==
At the 2014 AIBA Women's World Boxing Championships in Jeju City, Boora won the silver medal in the light heavyweight (81 kg) event after losing the final to China's Yang Xiaoli. Boora was the only Indian to reach the final of an event at the 2015 Asian Women's Amateur Boxing Championships in Wulanchabu where she settled for silver after losing to the same opponent.

In 2017, Boora received Government of Haryana's Bhim Award for her sporting achievements in the 2015–16 season. In 2018, she changed her weight class from light heavyweight (81 kg) to middleweight (75 kg) as the former is not part of the Summer Olympics. She was eliminated in the pre-quarterfinal round of the 2019 AIBA Women's World Boxing Championships.

On 12 February 2024, Sweety Boora joins Political Party BJP with his Husband Deepak Niwas Hooda.

=== 2023 IBA Women's World Boxing Championships ===
She became the 7th Indian boxer (male or female) to be crowned World Champion after defeating Wang Lina of China by 4–3 on 25 March 2023 in the Light heavyweight category.

== Allegations and controversy ==
In January 2026, Boora was allegedly involved in a roadside altercation in Almora, Uttarakhand, which drew widespread attention on social media. According to media reports, a video surfaced showing two women accused of throwing trash, including liquor bottles, from a vehicle onto a public road near a taxi union office on 26 January, a designated dry day in the state.

During the incident, a local taxi driver, later identified as Himanshu Pandey, was seen confronting the occupants of the vehicle. In the video, one of the women was allegedly seen slapping the driver, while another reportedly attempted to seize his mobile phone as bystanders recorded the confrontation.

Subsequent reports identified the women in the video as Boora and her sister, CV Boora. The incident occurred while they were travelling in a Haryana-registered vehicle. No official charges or convictions were reported at the time, and Boora had not publicly responded to the allegations as of January 2026.
