= Usha Nagisetty =

Indian boxer (born 1984)

Personal information
- Nationality: Indian
- Born: Usha Nagisetty; 13 August 1984 (age 42) Visakhapatnam, Andhra Pradesh, India
- Weight: Flyweight

Boxing career
Medal record
Women's amateur boxing
Representing India
World Championships
Silver medal – second place	2006 New Delhi	Featherweight
Silver medal – second place	2008 Ningbo City	Featherweight
Asian Championships
Gold medal – first place	2008 Guwahati	Featherweight

Usha Nagisetty (born 13 August 1984) is an Indian boxer from Visakhapatnam, Andhra Pradesh. She trains at the Sports Training Center in Visakhapatnam and is supported by Olympic Gold Quest, a not-for-profit foundation to identify and support Indian athletes. She won the gold medal at the 2008 Asian Women Boxing Championships and the silver medal at the 2008 AIBA Women's World Boxing Championship.

== Boxing career ==
Nagisetty has been receiving training at the Sports Training Centre (subscription required)in Visakhapatnam, from Her SAI coach Inukurthi Venkateshwara Rao from 2002.

She was the only female boxer who had been invited for demonstration bouts in the World Boxing Championship for men in 2009. On hearing the news, her coach said, “It is a great moment not just for Usha but for Indian boxing itself. Essentially, these bouts are being organised as part of the promotional campaign in view of the move to include women’s boxing in the 2012 London Olympics. Since Usha (57 kg) is already a familiar name, this invitation will help her in a big way,” Nagisetty herself commented saying, "This is a great recognition of my ability".

== Championships and other accomplishments ==
She has won two silver medals at the World Championships and won gold in 2008 at the fourth Asian Championship by defeating Imanbayeva Zhuldazay from Kazakhstan, in the 57 kg category.

She also won a gold medal for Andhra Pradesh at the Federation Cup in 2011. She once again won a gold medal at the All India Police Boxing Meet and at the Inter-Zonal National Boxing Championship.

In 2011, at the Federation Cup Women’s Boxing Championship, Nagisetty once again struck gold as she fought and won against National Champion Preeti Beniwal. Though it seemed like Preeti Beniwal had the advantage in the first three rounds, Nagisetty won in the end. “It was not an easy bout to win, Preeti fought well. I was looking to conserve my energy and go all out in the last two rounds. My strategy paid off in the end and I am very happy with my performance”, she claimed after winning.

She has also won gold medals at the All India Police Boxing Meet and at the Inter-Zonal National Boxing Championship.

== Awards and honors ==
- Dhyan Chand Award 2020

== Personal life ==
Nagisetty was born in Visakhapatnam, Andhra Pradesh, to N V Ramana and N Umamaheswari. She claims that her inspiration is her father who was also an athlete. She grew up around people who were supportive of her dreams. She said, “My neighbours were actually thrilled that I was a boxer and I used to love the attention. It really spurred me on.” Her brother Santosh is a boxer. Her husband Ganesh is a football goalkeeper.
