= Li Jinzi =

Chinese boxer (born 1990)

Personal information
- Nationality: Chinese
- Born: 4 March 1990 (age 36) Zhaodong, Heilongjiang, China
- Height: 1.76 m (5 ft 9 1/2 in)

Sport
- Sport: Boxing
Medal record
Women's amateur boxing
Representing China
Olympic Games
Bronze medal – third place	2012 London	Middleweight
World Championships
Gold medal – first place	2008 Ningbo	Middleweight
Silver medal – second place	2006 New Delhi	Middleweight
Silver medal – second place	2010 Bridgetown	Middleweight
Asian Championships
Gold medal – first place	2008 Guwahati	Middleweight
Gold medal – first place	2012 Ulaanbaatar	Middleweight

Li Jinzi (李金子; Lǐ Jīnzǐ, born 4 March 1990 in Zhaodong, Heilongjiang Province) is a Chinese boxer. She studied at the Jilin Institute of Physical Education, and began boxing at the age of 14. Li won a bronze medal in the women's middleweight competition at the 2012 London Olympics.

== See also ==
- China at the 2012 Summer Olympics – Boxing
