= Jenny Lalremliani =

Indian boxer

Personal information
- Nationality: Indian
- Born: 21 June 1983 (age 43) Dinthar Veng, Aizawl, Mizoram, India
- Weight: 63 kg (139 lb)

Sport
- Sport: Boxing
- Weight class: Light welterweight
Medal record
Representing India
Women's amateur boxing
World Championships
Gold medal – first place	2006 New Delhi	Light welterweight
Asian Championships
Gold medal – first place	2003 Hisar	Light welterweight
Gold medal – first place	2005 Kaohsiung	Light welterweight
Silver medal – second place	2001 Bangkok	Welterweight

Jenny R Lalremliani is an Indian amateur boxer competing at 63 kg. In 2006, she won a gold medal in the Women's World Amateur Boxing Championships.

When not boxing, she works as a police officer in the state of Mizoram.
