= Aruna Mishra =

Indian boxer

Personal information
- Nationality: Indian
- Born: 23 November 1979 (age 46) Jamshedpur, Jharkhand, india
- Weight: 64 kg (141 lb)

Sport
- Sport: Boxing (48kg, 51kg)
Medal record
Representing India
World Championships
Bronze medal – third place	2006 New Delhi	Welterweight
Asian Championships
Gold medal – first place	2003 Hisar	Welterweight
Silver medal – second place	2005 Kaohsiung	Welterweight

Aruna Mishra is a female Indian boxer. Her career highlights include gold medals in the 2003 Asian Championships, 2004 World Cup and the 2011 World Police and Fire Games.
