= Dariga =

Dariga is a Kazakhstani feminine given name. Notable people with the name include:

- Dariga Nazarbayeva (born 1963), Kazakh politician
- Dariga Shakimova (born 1988), Kazakhstani boxer
