= Renu Gora =

Indian boxer

Medal record

Women's amateur boxing

Representing India

World Championships
Bronze medal – third place	2006 New Delhi	Light heavyweight

Asian Championships
Silver medal – second place	2008 Guwahati	Middleweight
Bronze medal – third place	2003 Hisar	Heavyweight

Renu Gora is an Indian amateur boxer from Haryana.

Gora fought in the 80 kg category and won bronze medal in 2006 Women's World Amateur Boxing Championships.
