= 2023 IBA Women's World Boxing Championships – Light heavyweight =

Light heavyweight at the 2023 IBA Women's World Boxing Championships
- Venue: K. D. Jadhav Indoor Hall
- Location: New Delhi, India
- Dates: 17–25 March
- Competitors: 13 from 13 nations

Medalists
gold medal	Saweety Boora	India
silver medal	Wang Lina	China
bronze medal	Emma-Sue Greentree	Australia
bronze medal	Fariza Sholtay	Kazakhstan

The Light heavyweight competition at the 2023 IBA Women's World Boxing Championships was held between 17 and 25 March 2023.

== Results ==
Round of 16
(Turkey) Eda Yenilmez	0
(Belarus) Viktoriya Kebikava	5
(Thailand) Pornnipa Chutee	RSC
(Saint Lucia) Nikaela Khodra
(Australia) Emma-Sue Greentree	4
(Russia) Saltanat Medenova	3
(Vietnam) Nguyễn Thị Hương	0
(China) Wang Lina	5
(Trinidad and Tobago) Leeann Boodram
(Kazakhstan) Fariza Sholtay	RSC

Quarter-finals
(India) Saweety Boora	5
(Belarus) Viktoriya Kebikava	0
(Thailand) Pornnipa Chutee
(Australia) Emma-Sue Greentree	RSC
(Hungary) Tímea Nagy	0
(China) Wang Lina	5
(Kazakhstan) Fariza Sholtay	5
(Kenya) Elizabeth Andiego	0

Semi-finals
(India) Saweety Boora	4
(Australia) Emma-Sue Greentree	3
(China) Wang Lina	4
(Kazakhstan) Fariza Sholtay	1

Final
(India) Saweety Boora	4
(China) Wang Lina	3
