= 2003 Asian Women's Amateur Boxing Championships =

Boxing competitions

The second edition of the Women's Asian Amateur Boxing Championships were held from November 19 to November 23, 2003, in Hisar, India.

== Medalists ==
Event	Gold	Silver	Bronze
Pinweight (46 kg)	M.C. Mary Kom (IND)	Chou Szu Yin (TPE)	Tang Pui Ka (HKG)
Pinweight (46 kg)	M.C. Mary Kom (IND)	Chou Szu Yin (TPE)	Chandrika Guruge (SRI)
Light flyweight (48 kg)	Ri Jong Hyang (PRK)	Sheyan Furong) (CHN)	Kanaka Durga (IND)
Light flyweight (48 kg)	Ri Jong Hyang (PRK)	Sheyan Furong) (CHN)	K.A.A.Dilrukshi (SRI)
Flyweight (50 kg)	Kim Kwang-Ok (PRK)	Meena Kumari (IND)	Ji-Man Lee (TPE)
Flyweight (50 kg)	Kim Kwang-Ok (PRK)	Meena Kumari (IND)	Naoko Fujioka (JPN)
Super Flyweight (52 kg)	Pak-Kyong Ok (PRK)	Sushma Kumari Yadav (IND)	Li Bo (CHN)
Super Flyweight (52 kg)	Pak-Kyong Ok (PRK)	Sushma Kumari Yadav (IND)	Asami Yanase (JPN)
Bantamweight (54 kg)	Laishram Sarita Devi (IND)	Ha-Son Bi (PRK)	Hsin-Tzu Chien (TPE)
Bantamweight (54 kg)	Laishram Sarita Devi (IND)	Ha-Son Bi (PRK)	Zhang Xiyan (CHN)
Featherweight (57 kg)	Kum-Ju Yun (PRK)	Kim Hyo-Min (KOR)	Anuradha Lama (NEP)
Featherweight (57 kg)	Kum-Ju Yun (PRK)	Kim Hyo-Min (KOR)	Aswathy Prabha (IND)
Lightweight (60 kg)	Kang Kum-Hui (PRK)	Asha Rani Devi (IND)	Jin Shi (CHN)
Lightweight (60 kg)	Kang Kum-Hui (PRK)	Asha Rani Devi (IND)	Cho Jung-Sook (KOR)
Light welterweight (63 kg)	Jenny Lalremliani (IND)	Hye-Yong Kim (PRK)	Tian Dan (SRI)
Light welterweight (63 kg)	Jenny Lalremliani (IND)	Hye-Yong Kim (PRK)	Pitigala Sumudu (SRI)
Welterweight (66 kg)	Aruna Mishra (IND)	Wang Xian (CHN)	Yong-Sim Ri (PRK)
Welterweight (66 kg)	Aruna Mishra (IND)	Wang Xian (CHN)	Ya-Ting Lin (TPE)
Middleweight (70 kg)	Kim Chol Ok (PRK)	Shi Hongning (CHN)	Karamjit Kaur (IND)
Middleweight (70 kg)	Kim Chol Ok (PRK)	Shi Hongning (CHN)	Not Awarded
Super Middleweight (75 kg)	Guo Shuai (CHN)	Lekha Kozhummel Chettadi (IND)	Not Awarded
Super Middleweight (75 kg)	Guo Shuai (CHN)	Lekha Kozhummel Chettadi (IND)	Not Awarded
Light Heavyweight (80 kg)	Jyotsana (IND)	Kim Ji-Soo (KOR)	Not Awarded
Light Heavyweight (80 kg)	Jyotsana (IND)	Kim Ji-Soo (KOR)	Not Awarded
Heavyweight (+80 kg)	Wang Yanan (CHN)	Pan Hui Ling (TPE)	Gora Renu (IND)
Heavyweight (+80 kg)	Wang Yanan (CHN)	Pan Hui Ling (TPE)	Not Awarded

== Medal table ==
Rank	Nation	Gold	Silver	Bronze	Total
1	North Korea (PRK)	6	2	1	9
2	India (IND)	5	4	4	13
3	China (CHN)	2	3	3	8
4	Chinese Taipei (TPE)	0	2	3	5
5	South Korea (KOR)	0	2	1	3
6	Sri Lanka (SRI)	0	0	4	4
7	Japan (JPN)	0	0	2	2
8	Hong Kong (HKG)	0	0	1	1
8	Nepal (NEP)	0	0	1	1
Totals (9 entries)		13	13	20	46
