= 2016 AIBA Women's World Boxing Championships – Light heavyweight =

Boxing competitions

Light heavyweight at the 2016 AIBA Women's World Boxing Championships
- Dates: 21–27 May
- Competitors: 17 from 17 nations

Medalists
gold medal	Yang Xiaoli	China
silver medal	Kaye Scott	Australia
bronze medal	Franchon Crews	United States
bronze medal	Elif Guneri	Turkey

The Light heavyweight (81 kg) competition at the 2016 AIBA Women's World Boxing Championships was held from 19–27 May 2016.

== Draw ==
=== Preliminaries ===
	Result	
(Gabon) Chimene Moulomba	TKO	(Azerbaijan) Alina Gadzhiyeva

=== Main draw ===
Round of 16
22 May
(China) Yang Xiaoli	3
(Gabon) Chimene Moulomba	0
22 May
(Russia) Liubov Pashina	3
(Kazakhstan) Yulduz Mamatkulova	0
22 May
(Italy) Flavia Severin	0
(United States) Franchon Crews	3
22 May
(Hungary) Mária Kovács	2
(Uzbekistan) Ezozakhon Melieva	1
22 May
(Morocco) Soukayna Rabih	TKO
(Canada) Alison Greey
22 May
(Australia) Kaye Scott	3
(Mongolia) Erdenesoyolyn Undram	0
22 May
(Turkey) Elif Güneri	3
(Ukraine) Anatasiia Chernokolenko	0
22 May
(Belarus) Victoriya Kebikava	1
(India) Saweety	2

Quarterfinals
24 May
(China) Yang Xiaoli	3
(Russia) Liubov Pashina	0
24 May
(United States) Franchon Crews	3
(Hungary) Mária Kovács	0
24 May
(Morocco) Soukayna Rabih	0
(Australia) Kaye Scott	3
24 May
(Turkey) Elif Güneri	3
(India) Saweety	0

Semifinals
26 May
(China) Yang Xiaoli	3
(United States) Franchon Crews	0
26 May
(Australia) Kaye Scott	2
(Turkey) Elif Güneri	1

Final
27 May
(China) Yang Xiaoli	3
(Australia) Kaye Scott	0
