= 2025 IBA Women's World Boxing Championships – Middleweight =

Middleweight at the 2025 IBA Women's World Boxing Championships
- Venue: Sportski centar Čair
- Location: Niš, Serbia
- Dates: 12–14 March (preliminaries/semifinals); 16 March (final)
- Competitors: 14 from 14 nations

Medalists
gold medal	Anastasiia Shamonova	Russia
silver medal	Aoife O'Rourke	Ireland
bronze medal	Nikolina Gajić	Serbia
bronze medal	Wang Lina	China

The Middleweight competition at the 2025 IBA Women's World Boxing Championships was held from 12 to 16 March 2025.

== Results ==
Round of 16
(Belarus) Alina Veber	0
(Uzbekistan) Aziza Zokirova	5
(Kazakhstan) Nadezhda Ryabets	w/o
(Sierra Leone) Aminata Koroma
(Venezuela) Keidy Guevara	0
(Serbia) Nikolina Gajić	5
(Russia) Anastasiia Shamonova	5
(Cuba) Dayira Mesa	0
(Romania) Amalia Niță	4
(Turkey) Şeyma Düztaş	3
(Greece) Vasiliki Stavridou	2
(Nigeria) Patricia Mbata	5

Quarter-finals
(Republic of Ireland) Aoife O'Rourke	4
(Uzbekistan) Aziza Zokirova	1
(Kazakhstan) Nadezhda Ryabets	1
(Serbia) Nikolina Gajić	4
(Russia) Anastasiia Shamonova	5
(Romania) Amalia Niță	0
(Nigeria) Patricia Mbata	0
(China) Wang Lina	5

Semi-finals
(Republic of Ireland) Aoife O'Rourke	5
(Serbia) Nikolina Gajić	0
(Russia) Anastasiia Shamonova	4
(China) Wang Lina	1

Final
(Republic of Ireland) Aoife O'Rourke	0
(Russia) Anastasiia Shamonova	5
