= Siwi Boora =

Indian boxer

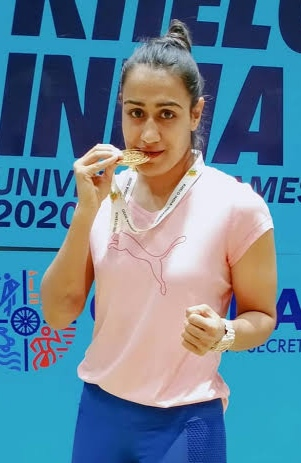
- Siwi Boora

Personal information
- Nationality: Indian
- Born: Hisar, Haryana, India

Sport
- Sport: Boxing
- Weight class: lightweight (60 Kg)
Medal record
Women's amateur boxing
Representing India
AIBA Nations Cup
Gold medal – first place	2014 3rd AIBA Nations Cup Vrbas, Serbia	2014 Vrbas Serbia
Nations Cup Serbia
Silver medal – second place	2015 2nd (Silver) 4th Nations Cup Serbia	2015 (UAE)

Siwi Boora is an Indian boxer who competes in the lightweight weight class. she has won a gold medal in Khelo India youth games and a subsequent gold medal in the Khelo university games.

== Early and personal life ==
Siwi Boora was born on 15 October 1998 in rural Hisar, Haryana. Her father Mahendra Singh, a farmer, played basketball at the national level. Saweety Boora, her older sister, is the one who inspired her to start boxing.

== Career ==
Participated in AIBA World Championship, Bulgaria, 20–29 November 2013. Participated in AIBA Women's Junior/Youth Boxing Championship, Taipei, Taiwan, 14–24 May 2015. Training Tour, Russia, October 2015. Participated in President's Cup, Kazakhstan, 4–11 June 2017. She participated in the fourth Elite Women National Boxing Championship, Weight class- 64 kg, Kannur, Kerala, 2–8 December 2019.
