= Dariga Shakimova =

Kazakhstani boxer (born 1988)

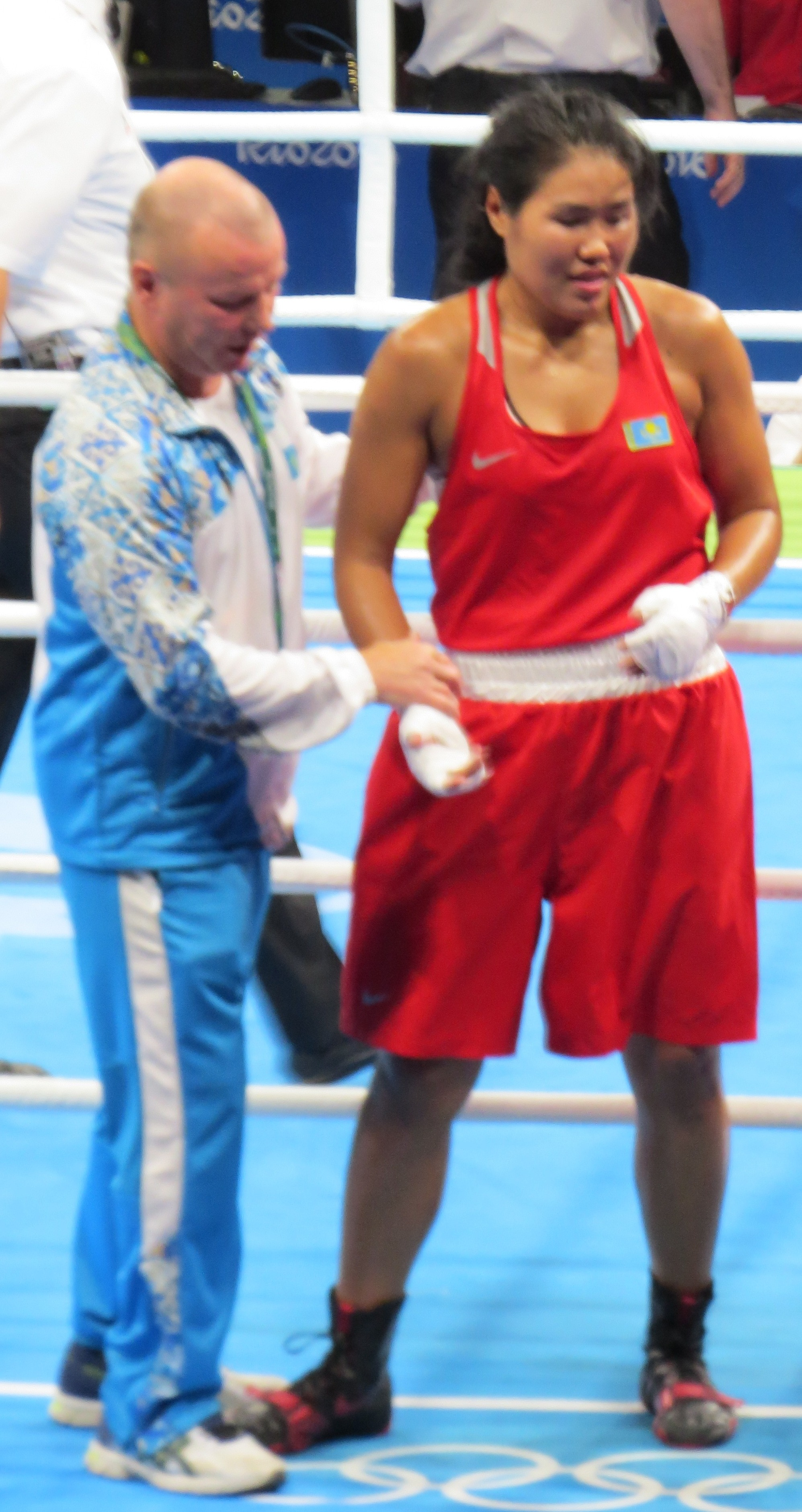
- Shakimova with coach at the 2016 Olympics

Personal information
- Born: 20 November 1988 (age 37) Petropavl, Kazakh SSR, Soviet Union
- Height: 172 cm (5 ft 8 in)

Sport
- Sport: Boxing
- Coached by: Vadim Prisyazhnyuk
Medal record
Women's amateur boxing
Representing Kazakhstan
Olympic Games
Bronze medal – third place	2016 Rio de Janeiro	Middleweight
Asian Championships
Gold medal – first place	2010 Astana	Middleweight
Gold medal – first place	2015 Wulanchabu	Middleweight
Bronze medal – third place	2008 Guwahati	Welterweight
Bronze medal – third place	2017 Ho Chi Minh City	Middleweight
Bronze medal – third place	2019 Bangkok	Welterweight
Bronze medal – third place	2022 Amman	Light middleweight
Asian Indoor Games
Bronze medal – third place	2009 Hanoi	Welterweight

Dariga Shakimova (born 20 November 1988) is a Kazakhstani boxer. In 2015, she was named the Female Boxer of the Year by the Kazakhstan Boxing Federation. She won a bronze medal in the middleweight event at the 2016 Summer Olympics. Shakimova studied at the Kazakh Academy of Sport and Tourism. After watching the film Million Dollar Baby, her mother wanted her to stop boxing, fearing for a serious injury. Shakimova's coach persuaded her to reconsider.
