= 2014 AIBA Women's World Boxing Championships – Light heavyweight =

Boxing competitions

The Light heavyweight (81 kg) competition at the 2014 AIBA Women's World Boxing Championships was held from 19–24 November 2014.

== Medalists ==
Gold	Yang Xiaoli (CHN)
Silver	Saweety (IND)
Bronze	Anastasiia Chernokolenko (UKR)
Bronze	Elif Güneri (TUR)

== Draw ==
First Round
(Croatia) Anamarija Maršić	3
(Kazakhstan) Yulduz Mamatkulova	0
(India) Saweety	2
(Netherlands) Maxine Koelemeij	0
(United States) Heidi Henriksen	3
(Uganda) Diana Turyanabo	0
(Ukraine) Anastasiia Chernokolenko	TKO
(Afghanistan) Fahima Shirzad
(Romania) Florina Radu	0
(Russia) Svetlana Kosova	3
(China) Yang Xiaoli	3
(Brazil) Andreia Bandeira	0
(Hungary) Petra Szatmári	3
(Morocco) Soukayna Rabih	0
(South Korea) Seong Su-yeon	0
(Turkey) Elif Güneri	3

Quarterfinals
(Croatia) Anamarija Maršić	0
(India) Saweety	2
(United States) Heidi Henriksen	0
(Ukraine) Anastasiia Chernokolenko	3
(Russia) Svetlana Kosova	0
(China) Yang Xiaoli	3
(Hungary) Petra Szatmári	0
(Turkey) Elif Güneri	3

Semifinals
(India) Saweety	3
(Ukraine) Anastasiia Chernokolenko	0
(China) Yang Xiaoli	3
(Turkey) Elif Güneri	0

Final
(India) Saweety	0
(China) Yang Xiaoli	3
