= Elif Güneri =

Turkish boxer (born 1987)

Personal information
- Nationality: Turkish
- Born: 9 October 1987 (age 38) Karabük, Turkey
- Height: 1.83 m (6 ft 0 in)

Boxing career
- Weight class: Light heavyweight

Boxing record
- Total fights: 33
- Wins: 21
- Win by KO: 0
- Losses: 12
- Draws: 0
- No contests: 0
Medal record
Women's amateur boxing
Representing Turkey
World Championships
Silver medal – second place	2019 Ulan-Ude	Light heavyweight
Bronze medal – third place	2014 Jeju City	Light heavyweight
Bronze medal – third place	2016 Astana	Light heavyweight
Bronze medal – third place	2018 New Delhi	Light heavyweight
Bronze medal – third place	2022 Istanbul	Light heavyweight
Bronze medal – third place	2025 Niš	Heavyweight
European Championships
Gold medal – first place	2016 Sofia	Light heavyweight
Gold medal – first place	2019 Alcobendas	Light heavyweight
Silver medal – second place	2018 Sofia	Light heavyweight
European Union Championships
Gold medal – first place	2017 Cascia	Light heavyweight
Bronze medal – third place	2010 Keszthely	Middleweight
Bronze medal – third place	2011 Katowice	Middleweight

Elif Güneri (born 9 October 1987) is a Turkish boxer.

She won a medal at the 2019 AIBA Women's World Boxing Championships.
