= Laishram Sarita Devi =

Indian boxer (born 1982)

Sarita Devi
Personal information
- Full name: Laishram Sarita Devi
- Nationality: Indian
- Born: 1 March 1982 (age 44) Thoubal khunou, Thoubal, Manipur, India
- Height: 168 cm (5 ft 6 in)
- Weight: 60 kg (132 lb)

Sport
- Sport: Boxing
- Weight class: Lightweight
- Club: All India Police
Medal record
Women's amateur boxing
Representing India
World Championships
Gold medal – first place	2006 New Delhi	Light bantamweight
Bronze medal – third place	2005 Podolsk	Bantamweight
Bronze medal – third place	2008 Ningbo	Light bantamweight
Asian Championships
Gold medal – first place	2003 Hisar	Bantamweight
Gold medal – first place	2005 Kaohsiung City	Bantamweight
Gold medal – first place	2008 Guwahati	Light bantamweight
Gold medal – first place	2010 Astana	Flyweight
Gold medal – first place	2012 Ulaanbaatar	Lightweight
Silver medal – second place	2001 Bangkok	Featherweight
Bronze medal – third place	2017 Ho Chi Minh City	Light welterweight
Bronze medal – third place	2019 Bangkok	Lightweight
Asian Games
Bronze medal – third place	2014 Incheon	Lightweight
Commonwealth Games
Silver medal – second place	2014 Glasgow	Lightweight

Laishram Sarita Devi (born 1 March 1982) is an Indian boxer from Manipur. She is a national champion and a former world champion in the lightweight class. In 2009, she was awarded Arjuna award by the government of India for her achievements.

== Early life ==
Sarita Devi was born in Khunou Thoubal into a Meitei Hindu family, as the sixth of eight siblings. She helped her parents to collect firewood and in the fields, which helped her build the stamina she has today. Sarita completed her high school in Waithou Mapal High School till the eighth standard and then went to Bal Baidya Mandir, Thoubal to complete her matriculation. She then went to an open-school to complete her twelfth standard to cope with her busy boxing schedule.

== Career ==
Devi turned professional in boxing in 2000, inspired by the achievements of Muhammad Ali. The following year, she represented India at the Asian Boxing Championships in Bangkok, and won a silver medal in her weight class. Following this victory, she won medals in various tournaments, including a gold at the 2006 World Championships in New Delhi. In 2005, she was offered the post of Sub-Inspector (SI) by the police department of Manipur, for winning a bronze medal in the 3rd World Women Boxing Championship, Russia and was promoted to the rank of DSP in February, 2010. She also won the silver medal at the 2014 Commonwealth Games in Glasgow.

She failed to qualify for the 2016 Rio Olympics, after losing to Victoria Torres, with a score of 0–3. In 2018, she won a silver medal at Indian Open International Championships, New Delhi and bagged a gold medal at Sr. National Boxing Championships, Rohtak. She also won in Women's World Boxing Championship with a split 4-0 verdict against Sandra Diana.

== 2014 Asian Games controversy ==
Devi entered the 2014 Asian Games in Incheon, South Korea, competing in the lightweight category. With a win margin of 3–0 both in the Round of 16 and Quarterfinals, she entered the semifinals to face South Korea's Park Ji-Na on 30 September. After the match, she was handed a 0–3 defeat verdict by the judges of the match, which turned out to be hugely controversial, considering that Devi had knocked Park out in the third round and also a convincing fourth round, before having rained heavy blows on Park throughout the first two rounds. Following this, the Indian team lodged a protest against the decision, which was rejected by the AIBA's technical committee. At the medal awarding ceremony, Devi refused to accept her bronze medal and handed it over to the silver medallist, Park. However, she accepted the medal later. This was followed by provisional suspension of her coaches by the AIBA. She was handed a one-year ban by the AIBA.
