= 2010 Asian Women's Amateur Boxing Championships =

The fifth edition of the Women's Asian Amateur Boxing Championships were held from May 24 to May 30, 2010 in Astana, Kazakhstan.

== Medalists ==
Event	Gold	Silver	Bronze
Pinweight (46 kg)	M.C. Mary Kom (IND)	Jong Ok (PRK)	Luo Jiaoling (CHN)
Pinweight (46 kg)	M.C. Mary Kom (IND)	Jong Ok (PRK)	Nguyen Thi Hoa (VIE)
Light flyweight (48 kg)	Kim Myong Sim (PRK)	Nazgul Boranbayeva (KAZ)	Luo Yujie (CHN)
Light flyweight (48 kg)	Kim Myong Sim (PRK)	Nazgul Boranbayeva (KAZ)	Alice Kate Aparri (PHI)
Flyweight (51 kg)	Laishram Sarita Devi (IND)	Myagmardulamyn Nandintsetseg (MGL)	Aya Shinmoto (JPN)
Flyweight (51 kg)	Laishram Sarita Devi (IND)	Myagmardulamyn Nandintsetseg (MGL)	Aigerim Askarova (KAZ)
Bantamweight (54 kg)	Zhaina Shekerbekova (KAZ)	Kim Hye Song (PRK)	Zhang Xiyan (CHN)
Bantamweight (54 kg)	Zhaina Shekerbekova (KAZ)	Kim Hye Song (PRK)	Priyanka Chaudhary (IND)
Featherweight (57 kg)	Yun Kum Ju (PRK)	Qin Jiang (CHN)	Liu Thi Duyen (VIE)
Featherweight (57 kg)	Yun Kum Ju (PRK)	Qin Jiang (CHN)	Ramilal Pavitra (IND)
Lightweight (60 kg)	Mavzuna Chorieva (TJK)	Ryu Yong Sum (PRK)	Su Wen Hsien (TPE)
Lightweight (60 kg)	Mavzuna Chorieva (TJK)	Ryu Yong Sum (PRK)	Dong Cheng (CHN)
Welterweight (64 kg)	Saida Khasenova (KAZ)	Yang Qinqin (CHN)	Le Thi Hien (VIE)
Welterweight (64 kg)	Saida Khasenova (KAZ)	Yang Qinqin (CHN)	Pak Kyong Ok (PRK)
Light Middleweight (69 kg)	Yang Tingting (CHN)	Ri Suk Yong (PRK)	Kavita Goyat (IND)
Light Middleweight (69 kg)	Yang Tingting (CHN)	Ri Suk Yong (PRK)	Elena Koltsova (KAZ)
Middleweight (75 kg)	Dariga Shakimova (KAZ)	Tang Jieli (CHN)	Sonam Yadav (IND)
Middleweight (75 kg)	Dariga Shakimova (KAZ)	Tang Jieli (CHN)	Unknown (PRK)
Light Heavyweight (81 kg)	Wang Yanrui (CHN)	Ashwati Mol (IND)	Bayasgalangiin Odmaa (MGL)
Light Heavyweight (81 kg)	Wang Yanrui (CHN)	Ashwati Mol (IND)	Yuldus Mamatkulova (KAZ)
Heavyweight (+81 kg)	Marina Volnova (KAZ)	Li Yunfei (CHN)	Kavita Chahal (IND)
Heavyweight (+81 kg)	Marina Volnova (KAZ)	Li Yunfei (CHN)	Randa Abdelkhaleq (JOR)

== Medal table ==
Rank	Nation	Gold	Silver	Bronze	Total
1	Kazakhstan (KAZ)	4	1	3	8
2	China (CHN)	2	4	4	10
3	North Korea (PRK)	2	4	2	8
4	India (IND)	2	1	5	8
5	Tajikistan (TJK)	1	0	0	1
6	Mongolia (MGL)	0	1	1	2
7	Vietnam (VIE)	0	0	3	3
8	Chinese Taipei (TPE)	0	0	1	1
8	Japan (JPN)	0	0	1	1
8	Jordan (JOR)	0	0	1	1
8	Philippines (PHI)	0	0	1	1
Totals (11 entries)		11	11	22	44
