= Nguyễn Thị Hương (boxer) =

Vietnamese boxer

Personal information
- Nationality: Vietnamese

Boxing career
- Weight class: Light heavyweight
Medal record
Women's amateur boxing
Representing Vietnam
World Championships
Bronze medal – third place	2019 Ulan-Ude	Light heavyweight
Asian Championships
Silver medal – second place	2017 Ho Chi Minh City	Light heavyweight
Bronze medal – third place	2019 Bangkok	Light heavyweight
Bronze medal – third place	2022 Amman	Light heavyweight

Nguyễn Thị Hương is a Vietnamese boxer.

She won a medal at the 2019 AIBA Women's World Boxing Championships.
