= Alice Aparri =

Filipino boxer

Personal information
- Nationality: Filipino
- Born: Alice Kate Aparri; 1984 or 1985 (age 41–42) Baguio, Benguet, Philippines
- Weight: Pinweight; Light Flyweight; Flyweight

Boxing career
Medal record
Women's amateur boxing
Representing the Philippines
World Championships
| Bronze medal – third place | 2006 New Delhi | Light Flyweight |
| Bronze medal – third place | 2010 Bridgetown | Light Flyweight |
Asian Championships
| Bronze medal – third place | 2001 Bangkok | Pinweight |
| Bronze medal – third place | 2010 Astana | Light Flyweight |
| Bronze medal – third place | 2012 Ulan Baatar | Flyweight |
Southeast Asian Games
| Gold medal – first place | 2005 Bacolod | Pinweight |
| Silver medal – second place | 2007 Amphoe Pak Thong Chai | Light Flyweight |
| Gold medal – first place | 2009 Vientiane | Light Flyweight |
| Gold medal – first place | 2011 Jakarta | Light Flyweight |

Alice Kate Aparri (born 1984 or 1985) is a Filipino light flyweight amateur boxer.

Aparri represented the Philippines in South East Asian Games for four events.
