= 2019 AIBA Women's World Boxing Championships – Light heavyweight =

Light heavyweight at the 2019 AIBA Women's World Boxing Championships
- Venue: FSK Sports Complex
- Location: Ulan-Ude, Russia
- Dates: 6–13 October
- Competitors: 10 from 10 nations

Medalists
gold medal	Zenfira Magomedalieva	Russia
silver medal	Elif Güneri	Turkey
bronze medal	Wang Lina	China
bronze medal	Nguyễn Thị Hương	Vietnam

The Light heavyweight competition at the 2019 AIBA Women's World Boxing Championships was held between 6 and 13 October 2019.

== Schedule ==
The schedule was as follows:

Date	Time	Round
Sunday 6 October 2019	20:00	Round of 16
Thursday 10 October 2019	20:00	Quarterfinals
Saturday 12 October 2019	20:00	Semifinals
Sunday 13 October 2019	After 16:00	Final

All times are Irkutsk Time (UTC+8)

== Results ==
Round of 16
(Australia) Jessica Bagley	1
(Kazakhstan) Fariza Sholtay	4
(India) Nandini	0
(Germany) Irina Schönberger	5

Quarterfinals
(China) Wang Lina	5
(Kazakhstan) Fariza Sholtay	0
(Russia) Zenfira Magomedalieva	ABD
(Uzbekistan) Ezozakhon Melieva
(United States) Krystal Graham	2
(Vietnam) Nguyễn Thị Hương	3
(Germany) Irina Schönberger	2
(Turkey) Elif Güneri	3

Semifinals
(China) Wang Lina	0
(Russia) Zenfira Magomedalieva	4
(Vietnam) Nguyễn Thị Hương	0
(Turkey) Elif Güneri	5

Final
(Russia) Zenfira Magomedalieva	5
(Turkey) Elif Güneri	0
