= Yang Xiaoli =

Chinese boxer (born 1990)

Personal information
- Born: 1 September 1990 (age 35) Haiyang, Shandong, China

Boxing career
- Weight class: Heavyweight

Boxing record
- Total fights: 5
- Wins: 4
- Win by KO: 0
- Losses: 1
- Draws: 0
- No contests: 0
Medal record
Women's amateur boxing
Representing China
World Championships
Gold medal – first place	2014 Jeju City	Light heavyweight
Gold medal – first place	2016 Astana	Light heavyweight
Gold medal – first place	2018 New Delhi	Heavyweight
Silver medal – second place	2019 Ulan-Ude	Heavyweight
Asian Championships
Gold medal – first place	2015 Wulanchabu	Light heavyweight
Gold medal – first place	2017 Ho Chi Minh City	Light heavyweight
Gold medal – first place	2019 Bangkok	Heavyweight

Yang Xiaoli (born 1 September 1990) is a Chinese amateur boxer and a three-time women's world boxing champion. She won the gold medal in the light heavyweight division at the 2014 and 2016 Women's World Boxing Championships. She won the gold medal in the heavyweight division at the 2018 Women's World Boxing Championships.
