= 2005 Asian Women's Amateur Boxing Championships =

Boxing competitions

The third edition of the Women's Asian Amateur Boxing Championships were held from August 5 to August 12, 2005, in Kaohsiung, Taiwan.

== Medalists ==
Event	Gold	Silver	Bronze
Pinweight (46 kg)	M.C. Mary Kom (IND)	Gretchen Abaniel (PHI)	Chou Hsiu Chen (TPE)
Pinweight (46 kg)	M.C. Mary Kom (IND)	Gretchen Abaniel (PHI)	Chiaki Kadokura (JPN)
Light flyweight (48 kg)	Ri Jong Hyang (PRK)	Ngumian Nahea (THA)	Kanaka Durga (IND)
Light flyweight (48 kg)	Ri Jong Hyang (PRK)	Ngumian Nahea (THA)	Rumiris Simarmata (INA)
Flyweight (50 kg)	Hyang Mi Park (PRK)	Cheng Ting-Chun (TPE)	Thawil Suwannawang (THA)
Flyweight (50 kg)	Hyang Mi Park (PRK)	Cheng Ting-Chun (TPE)	Veronica Nicolas (INA)
Super Flyweight (52 kg)	Chen Chia Ling (TPE)	Annalisa Cruz (PHI)	Asami Yanase (JPN)
Super Flyweight (52 kg)	Chen Chia Ling (TPE)	Annalisa Cruz (PHI)	Pham Quynh Trang (VIE)
Bantamweight (54 kg)	Laishram Sarita Devi (IND)	Ha-Son Bi (PRK)	Wong Sio Chao (MAC)
Bantamweight (54 kg)	Laishram Sarita Devi (IND)	Ha-Son Bi (PRK)	Ta Thi Minh Nghia (VIE)
Featherweight (57 kg)	Yun Kum Ju (PRK)	Tassamalee Tongjan (THA)	Chisato Mizuno (JPN)
Featherweight (57 kg)	Yun Kum Ju (PRK)	Tassamalee Tongjan (THA)	Aswathy Prabha (IND)
Lightweight (60 kg)	Mitchelle Martinez (PHI)	Pranamika Borah (IND)	Kang Kum Hui (PRK)
Lightweight (60 kg)	Mitchelle Martinez (PHI)	Pranamika Borah (IND)	Dinh Thi Phuong Thanh (VIE)
Light welterweight (63 kg)	Jenny Lalremliani (IND)	Wan Jyun Sie (TPE)	Kim So Yeon (KOR)
Light welterweight (63 kg)	Jenny Lalremliani (IND)	Wan Jyun Sie (TPE)	Not Awarded
Welterweight (66 kg)	Ri Suk Yong (PRK)	Aruna Mishra (IND)	Hsueh Chun Chu (TPE)
Welterweight (66 kg)	Ri Suk Yong (PRK)	Aruna Mishra (IND)	Not Awarded
Middleweight (70 kg)	Aswathy Mol Chenthital (IND)	Hu Ya Ming (TPE)	Not Awarded
Middleweight (70 kg)	Aswathy Mol Chenthital (IND)	Hu Ya Ming (TPE)	Not Awarded
Super Middleweight (75 kg)	Karamjeet Kaur (IND)	Liao Hyi Wen (TPE)	Not Awarded
Super Middleweight (75 kg)	Karamjeet Kaur (IND)	Liao Hyi Wen (TPE)	Not Awarded
Light Heavyweight (80 kg)	Lekha K.C. (IND)	Chen Chu Chun (TPE)	Not Awarded
Light Heavyweight (80 kg)	Lekha K.C. (IND)	Chen Chu Chun (TPE)	Not Awarded
Heavyweight (86 kg)	Jyotsana (IND)	Wong Yin Chu (HKG)	Unknown (TPE)
Heavyweight (86 kg)	Jyotsana (IND)	Wong Yin Chu (HKG)	Not Awarded

== Medal table ==
Rank	Nation	Gold	Silver	Bronze	Total
1	India (IND)	7	2	2	11
2	North Korea (PRK)	4	1	1	6
3	Chinese Taipei (TPE)	1	5	3	9
4	Philippines (PHI)	1	2	0	3
5	Thailand (THA)	0	2	1	3
6	Hong Kong (HKG)	0	1	0	1
7	Japan (JPN)	0	0	3	3
7	Vietnam (VIE)	0	0	3	3
9	Indonesia (INA)	0	0	2	2
10	Macau (MAC)	0	0	1	1
10	South Korea (KOR)	0	0	1	1
Totals (11 entries)		13	13	17	43

== See also ==
- List of sporting events in Taiwan
