= Emma-Sue Greentree =

Australian boxer (born 1999)

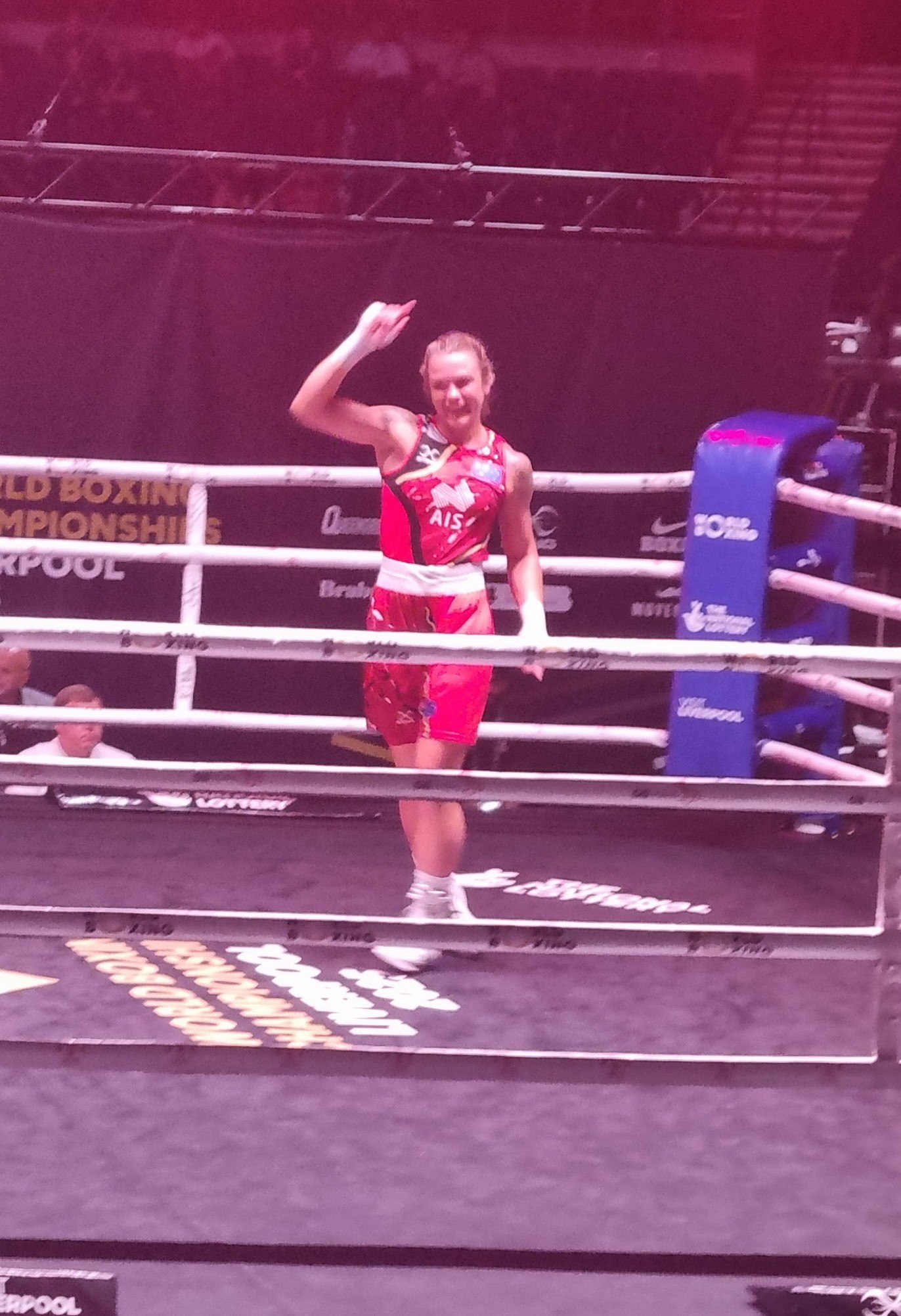

Personal information
- Born: 28 January 1999 (age 27) Hunter Region, New South Wales, Australia
- Height: 1.78 m (5 ft 10 in)
- Weight: Middleweight / Light heavyweight

Boxing career
Medal record
Women's amateur boxing
Representing Australia
World Championships
Bronze medal – third place	2025 Liverpool	75 kg
IBA World Championships
Bronze medal – third place	2023 New Delhi	Light heavyweight
Australian National Championships
Gold medal – first place	2024	Middleweight
Gold medal – first place	2023	Light heavyweight
Commonwealth Games
Gold medal – first place	2026 Glasgow	75kg

Emma-Sue Greentree (born 1999) is an Australian amateur boxer who competes in the middleweight (75 kg) and light-heavyweight (81 kg) divisions. Greentree is not only a two-time Australian national champion, she won Bronze at the 2023 IBA World Amateur Boxing Championships in New Delhi, Bronze at the 2025 World Boxing Championships in Liverpool, and Gold at the 2026 Commonwealth Games in Glasgow.

== Early life and background ==
Greentree was born and raised in the Hunter region of New South Wales, Australia; more specifically the Central Coast & Lake Macquarie regions. She comes from a large family with nine siblings, including Olympic softball bronze medalist Belinda Wright, who won her medal at the 2008 Beijing Olympics. In 2008, at the age of nine, Greentree was diagnosed with Type 1 diabetes a mere 2 weeks after her sisters Olympic success.

== Athletic career ==
=== Track and field ===
Before boxing, Greentree was a talented heptathlete who competed nationally throughout her junior years, winning medals at national championships. She was a national heptathlon champion at age 16 and was part of the athletics program at Hunter Sports High School.

Her athletics career ended when she ruptured her posterior cruciate ligament (PCL) while playing rugby in year 11 (2017). Unable to return to her previous performance levels in athletics, she decided to pursue a new sport.

=== Boxing career ===
Greentree began boxing in 2017. She was introduced to the sport through a family connection with Steve Mannix of Central Coast Boxing at Budgewoi, where her father had worked and her brother Daniel also trained.

Greentree's major international breakthrough came at the 2023 World Amateur Boxing Championships in New Delhi, India, where she won bronze in the light-heavyweight division (81 kg). In the semi-final, she was defeated by India's Saweety Boora on a split decision (4–3), with Boora subsequently winning the gold medal.

In September 2024, Greentree made her professional boxing debut, defeating Stephanie Mfongwot in a six-round contest, winning every round. This victory placed her at #3 in the light-heavyweight rankings on BoxRec.

Greentree was selected for the Australian team for the 2025 World Boxing Championships in Liverpool, England.

In April 2026, Greentree was selected to represent Australia at the Commonwealth Gamers in Glasgow, Scotland. Competing in the 75 kg division, she won the gold medal, deferring India's Lovlina Borgohain in the final.

== Personal life ==
Greentree is an advocate for athletes with Type 1 diabetes. She manages her condition using a continuous glucose monitor (CGM) that tracks her blood sugar levels and sends data to her phone. She follows a strict diet with support from a dietician who is part of her sponsorship team.

Outside of boxing, Greentree works as a Special and Inclusive Education Teacher's Aide (SLSO) on the Central Coast, where she supports students in the special education unit.
