= Wang Lina (boxer) =

Chinese boxer (born 1997)

Personal information
- Nationality: Chinese
- Born: 30 March 1997 (age 29)

Boxing career
- Weight class: Light heavyweight

Boxing record
- Total fights: 5
- Wins: 5
- Win by KO: 0
- Losses: 0
- Draws: 0
- No contests: 0
Medal record
Women's amateur boxing
Representing China
World Championships
Bronze medal – third place	2025 Liverpool	75 kg
IBA World Championships
Gold medal – first place	2018 New Delhi	Light heavyweight
Silver medal – second place	2023 New Delhi	Light heavyweight
Bronze medal – third place	2019 Ulan-Ude	Light heavyweight
Bronze medal – third place	2025 Niš	Middleweight
Asian Championships
Gold medal – first place	2024 Chiang Mai	Middleweight
Silver medal – second place	2019 Bangkok	Light heavyweight

Wang Lina (born 30 March 1997) is a Chinese boxer.

She won a medal at the 2019 AIBA Women's World Boxing Championships.
