= 2018 AIBA Women's World Boxing Championships – Heavyweight =

Boxing competitions

Heavyweight at the 2018 AIBA Women's World Boxing Championships
- Dates: 18–24 November
- Competitors: 10 from 10 nations

Medalists
gold medal	Yang Xiaoli	China
silver medal	Şennur Demir	Turkey
bronze medal	Danielle Perkins	United States
bronze medal	Kristina Tkacheva	Russia

The heavyweight (+81 kg) competition at the 2018 AIBA Women's World Boxing Championships was held from 18 to 24 November 2018.

== Draw ==
Round of 16
18 November
(Kazakhstan) Lazzat Kungeibayeva	5
(Ukraine) Tetiana Shevchenko	0
18 November
(Hungary) Adrienn Juhász
(Uzbekistan) Guzal Ismatova	RSC

Quarterfinals
20 November
(United States) Danielle Perkins	5
(Kazakhstan) Lazzat Kungeibayeva	0
20 November
(India) Seema Poonia	0
(China) Yang Xiaoli	5
20 November
(Turkey) Şennur Demir	5
(Italy) Flavia Severin	0
20 November
(Uzbekistan) Guzal Ismatova	2
(Russia) Kristina Tkacheva	3

Semifinals
23 November
(United States) Danielle Perkins
(China) Yang Xiaoli	WO
23 November
(Turkey) Şennur Demir	5
(Russia) Kristina Tkacheva	0

Final
24 November
(China) Yang Xiaoli	5
(Turkey) Şennur Demir	0
