= Aoife O'Rourke =

Irish boxer (born 1997)

Personal information
- Full name: Aoife O'Rourke
- Nationality: Irish
- Born: 2 July 1997 (age 29) Castlerea, Ireland

Sport
- Sport: Boxing
- Weight class: Middleweight (75 kg)
- Club: Castlerea Boxing Club
Medal record
Women's amateur boxing
Representing Ireland
World Championships
Gold medal – first place	2025 Liverpool	75 kg
IBA World Championships
Silver medal – second place	2025 Nis	Middleweight
European Games
Gold medal – first place	2023 Kraków-Małopolska	Middleweight
European Championships
Gold medal – first place	2019 Alcobendas	Middleweight
Gold medal – first place	2022 Budva	Middleweight
Gold medal – first place	2024 Belgrade	Middleweight
Gold medal – first place	2026 Sofia	75 kg

Aoife O'Rourke (born 2 July 1997) is an Irish amateur boxer. She won a gold medal in the 75 kg category at the 2025 World Boxing Championships and a silver medal in the middleweight division at the 2025 IBA Women's World Championships. O'Rourke also won gold medals in the same weight category at the 2019, 2022, 2024 and 2026 European Championships as well at the 2023 European Games. She represented Ireland at the 2024 Summer Olympics but lost in the first round.

O'Rourke's sister Lisa is also a boxer and won gold at the 2022 World Championships in the light middleweight division. In 2025, the sisters made boxing history, by becoming the first sisters to win through to contest a World Championship final in the same tournament. Also in 2025, the sisters won gold at the World Hyrox Championships in Chicago.
