= 2025 World Boxing Championships – Women's 75 kg =

Competition at amateur boxing tournament

Women's 75 kg at the 2025 World Boxing Championships
- Venue: Liverpool Arena
- Location: Liverpool, England
- Dates: 4–14 September
- Competitors: 18 from 18 nations

Medalists
gold medal	Aoife O'Rourke	Ireland
silver medal	Büşra Işıldar	Turkey
bronze medal	Emma-Sue Greentree	Australia
bronze medal	Wang Lina	China

The Women's 75 kg competition at the 2025 World Boxing Championships was held from 4 to 14 September 2025.

== Results ==
=== Final ===
Final; 14 September
Büşra Işıldar (TUR)	0
Aoife O'Rourke (IRL)	5

=== Top half ===
Preliminaries; 4 September
Oliwia Toborek (POL)	0
Büşra Işıldar (TUR)	5

Round of 16; 6 September
Lovlina Borgohain (IND)	0
Büşra Işıldar (TUR)	5
Mary-Kate Smith (ENG)	5
Olha Pylypchuk (UKR)	0
Naomi Graham (USA)	5
Dunia Martinez (ESP)	0
Emma-Sue Greentree (AUS)	ABD
Seong Su-yeon (KOR)

Quarter-finals; 10 September
Büşra Işıldar (TUR)	5
Mary-Kate Smith (ENG)	0
Naomi Graham (USA)	0
Emma-Sue Greentree (AUS)	5

Semi-finals; 13 September
Büşra Işıldar (TUR)	4
Emma-Sue Greentree (AUS)	1

=== Bottom half ===
Preliminaries; 4 September
Melissa Gemini (ITA)	4
Citlalli Ortiz (MEX)	1

Round of 16; 6 September
Viviane Pereira (BRA)	5
Vasiliki Stavridou (GRE)	0
Nadezhda Ryabets (KAZ)	0
Wang Lina (CHN)	5
Aoife O'Rourke (IRL)	5
Monika Langerová (CZE)	0
Melissa Gemini (ITA)	0
Sunniva Hofstad (NOR)	5

Quarter-finals; 10 September
Viviane Pereira (BRA)	0
Wang Lina (CHN)	5
Aoife O'Rourke (IRL)	4
Sunniva Hofstad (NOR)	1

Semi-finals; 13 September
Wang Lina (CHN)	0
Aoife O'Rourke (IRL)	4
