= Lekha K. C. =

Indian boxer

Lekha K.C.
Personal information
- Full name: Lekha Kozhummel Chettadi
- Nationality: Indian
- Born: 22 April 1981 (age 45) Kannur, Kerala, India

Sport
- Sport: Boxing
Medal record
Women's Boxing
Representing India
World Championships
Gold medal – first place	2006 New Delhi	– 75kg
Asian Championships
Gold medal – first place	2005 Kaohsiung City	80kg
Silver medal – second place	2008 Guwahati	80kg

Lekha K. C. represented Indian Women's Amateur boxing at 75 kg category and won gold medal in 2006 Women's World Amateur Boxing Championships.

== Early life ==
Lekha was born in Kannur district of Kerala to M. V. Govindan Nambiar and Rohini K. C.

== Career ==
Lekha was trained at Sports Authority of India's centre at Kollam. She had won the National women's boxing championship six times in succession starting from 2001. She was among the four gold medallists that won the World Championship in 2006 for India. She won the gold in 75 kg category. She had won gold in the 2005 Asian championship and silver in the 2008 Asian championship. She was awarded the Dhyan Chand award for lifetime achievement in the year 2021.
