= 2015 Asian Women's Amateur Boxing Championships =

Boxing competitions

The seventh edition of the Women's Asian Amateur Boxing Championships were held from August 7 to August 13, 2015, in Wulanchabu, China.

== Medalists ==
Event	Gold	Silver	Bronze
Light flyweight (48 kg)	E Naiyan (CHN)	U Yong-gum (PRK)	Baik Cho-rong (KOR)
Light flyweight (48 kg)	E Naiyan (CHN)	U Yong-gum (PRK)	Sarjubala Shamjetsabam (IND)
Flyweight (51 kg)	Ren Cancan (CHN)	Ri Hyang-mi (PRK)	Ayako Minowa (JPN)
Flyweight (51 kg)	Ren Cancan (CHN)	Ri Hyang-mi (PRK)	Myagmardulamyn Nandintsetseg (MGL)
Bantamweight (54 kg)	Peamwilai Laopeam (THA)	Nesthy Petecio (PHI)	Myagmaryn Gündegmaa (MGL)
Bantamweight (54 kg)	Peamwilai Laopeam (THA)	Nesthy Petecio (PHI)	Meena Kumari (IND)
Featherweight (57 kg)	Tassamelee Thongjan (THA)	Ri Kwang-suk (PRK)	Yodgor Mirzoyeva (UZB)
Featherweight (57 kg)	Tassamelee Thongjan (THA)	Ri Kwang-suk (PRK)	Pwilao Basumatary (IND)
Lightweight (60 kg)	Oh Yeon-ji (KOR)	Ri Tong-sun (PRK)	Yin Junhua (CHN)
Lightweight (60 kg)	Oh Yeon-ji (KOR)	Ri Tong-sun (PRK)	Mavzuna Chorieva (TJK)
Welterweight (64 kg)	Yang Wenlu (CHN)	Pak Kyong-ok (PRK)	Hà Thi Linh (VIE)
Welterweight (64 kg)	Yang Wenlu (CHN)	Pak Kyong-ok (PRK)	Shoira Zulkaynarova (TJK)
Light Middleweight (69 kg)	Gu Hong (CHN)	Shakhnoza Nizamova (UZB)	Gaukhar Ermekbay (KAZ)
Light Middleweight (69 kg)	Gu Hong (CHN)	Shakhnoza Nizamova (UZB)	Wu Pei-Yi (TPE)
Middleweight (75 kg)	Dariga Shakimova (KAZ)	Li Qian (CHN)	Pooja Rani (IND)
Middleweight (75 kg)	Dariga Shakimova (KAZ)	Li Qian (CHN)	Sung Su-yeon (KOR)
Light Heavyweight (81 kg)	Yang Xiaoli (CHN)	Sweety Boora (IND)	Dilnovaz Narkhodzhayeva (UZB)
Light Heavyweight (81 kg)	Yang Xiaoli (CHN)	Sweety Boora (IND)	Moldir Bazarbayeva (KAZ)
Heavyweight (+81 kg)	Wang Shijin (CHN)	Guzal Ismatova (UZB)	Lyazzat Kungenbayeva (KAZ)
Heavyweight (+81 kg)	Wang Shijin (CHN)	Guzal Ismatova (UZB)	Seema Punia (IND)

== Medal table ==
Rank	Nation	Gold	Silver	Bronze	Total
1	China (CHN)	6	1	1	8
2	Thailand (THA)	2	0	0	2
3	Kazakhstan (KAZ)	1	0	3	4
4	South Korea (KOR)	1	0	2	3
5	North Korea (PRK)	0	5	0	5
6	Uzbekistan (UZB)	0	2	2	4
7	India (IND)	0	1	5	6
8	Philippines (PHI)	0	1	0	1
9	Mongolia (MGL)	0	0	2	2
9	Tajikistan (TJK)	0	0	2	2
11	Chinese Taipei (TPE)	0	0	1	1
11	Japan (JPN)	0	0	1	1
11	Vietnam (VIE)	0	0	1	1
Totals (13 entries)		10	10	20	40
