= 2001 Asian Women's Amateur Boxing Championships =

Boxing competitions

The first edition of the Women's Asian Amateur Boxing Championships were held from August 25 to August 29, 2001, in Bangkok, Thailand.

== Medalists ==
Event	Gold	Silver	Bronze
Pinweight (45 kg)	Pak Kyong Ok (PRK)	Chou Szu Yin (TPE)	Wanpen Tonwong (THA)
Pinweight (45 kg)	Pak Kyong Ok (PRK)	Chou Szu Yin (TPE)	Alice Kate Aparri (PHI)
Light flyweight (46–48 kg)	Ri Jong Hyang (PRK)	Zhao Li (CHN)	Librada Tamson (PHI)
Light flyweight (46–48 kg)	Ri Jong Hyang (PRK)	Zhao Li (CHN)	Saowanit Jamsai (THA)
Flyweight (51 kg)	Kim Kum Son (PRK)	Preewadee Pansombat (THA)	Etsuko Tada (JPN)
Flyweight (51 kg)	Kim Kum Son (PRK)	Preewadee Pansombat (THA)	Li Bo (CHN)
Bantamweight (54 kg)	Ha Son Bi (PRK)	Nantana Pramoonsilp (THA)	Wang Xiaona (CHN)
Bantamweight (54 kg)	Ha Son Bi (PRK)	Nantana Pramoonsilp (THA)	Sushma Kumari Yadav (IND)
Featherweight (57 kg)	Zhang Maomao (CHN)	Laishram Sarita Devi (IND)	Hyon Un Mi (PRK)
Featherweight (57 kg)	Zhang Maomao (CHN)	Laishram Sarita Devi (IND)	Jouvilet Chilem (PHI)
Lightweight (60 kg)	Jon Pok Sun (PRK)	Wei Qing (CHN)	Rosie Villarito (PHI)
Lightweight (60 kg)	Jon Pok Sun (PRK)	Wei Qing (CHN)	Ratree Kruadae (THA)
Light welterweight (63.5 kg)	Mitchel Martinez (PHI)	Tian Dan (CHN)	H.M.M.Herath (SRI)
Light welterweight (63.5 kg)	Mitchel Martinez (PHI)	Tian Dan (CHN)	Piamwilai Laopiam (THA)
Welterweight (67 kg)	Monruthai Bangsalad (THA)	Jenny Lalremliani (IND)	Not Awarded
Welterweight (67 kg)	Monruthai Bangsalad (THA)	Jenny Lalremliani (IND)	Not Awarded
Middleweight (71 kg)	Guo Shuai (CHN)	Lakshmi (IND)	Jeerawan Thinthup (THA)
Middleweight (71 kg)	Guo Shuai (CHN)	Lakshmi (IND)	Taka Ishigaki (JPN)

== Medal table ==
Rank	Nation	Gold	Silver	Bronze	Total
1	North Korea (PRK)	5	0	1	6
2	China (CHN)	2	3	2	7
3	Thailand (THA)	1	2	5	8
4	Philippines (PHI)	1	0	4	5
5	India (IND)	0	3	1	4
6	Chinese Taipei (TPE)	0	1	0	1
7	Japan (JPN)	0	0	2	2
8	Sri Lanka (SRI)	0	0	1	1
Totals (8 entries)		9	9	16	34
