= 2012 Asian Women's Amateur Boxing Championships =

Boxing competition in Ulaanbaatar, Mongolia

The sixth edition of the Women's Asian Amateur Boxing Championships were held from March 19 to March 25, 2012 in Ulaanbaatar, Mongolia.

== Medalists ==
Event	Gold	Silver	Bronze
Light flyweight (48 kg)	Tömörkhuyagiin Bolortuul (MGL)	Pinky Jangra (IND)	Hsieh Meng-chun (TPE)
Light flyweight (48 kg)	Tömörkhuyagiin Bolortuul (MGL)	Pinky Jangra (IND)	Luo Yujie (CHN)
Flyweight (51 kg)	M.C. Mary Kom (IND)	Ren Cancan (CHN)	Ayako Minowa (JPN)
Flyweight (51 kg)	M.C. Mary Kom (IND)	Ren Cancan (CHN)	Alice Kate Aparri (PHI)
Bantamweight (54 kg)	Liu Kejia (CHN)	Sonia Lather (IND)	Gulzhan Akimova (KAZ)
Bantamweight (54 kg)	Liu Kejia (CHN)	Sonia Lather (IND)	Nesthy Petecio (PHI)
Featherweight (57 kg)	Tassamelee Thongjan (THA)	Kim Kil-ok (PRK)	Yang Yanzi (CHN)
Featherweight (57 kg)	Tassamelee Thongjan (THA)	Kim Kil-ok (PRK)	Luu Thi Hanh (VIE)
Lightweight (60 kg)	Laishram Sarita Devi (IND)	Mavzuna Chorieva (TJK)	Kim Hye-yong (PRK)
Lightweight (60 kg)	Laishram Sarita Devi (IND)	Mavzuna Chorieva (TJK)	Dong Cheng (CHN)
Welterweight (64 kg)	Erdenesoyolyn Uyanga (MGL)	Xie Lili (CHN)	Le Thi Hien (VIE)
Welterweight (64 kg)	Erdenesoyolyn Uyanga (MGL)	Xie Lili (CHN)	Firuza Sharipova (KAZ)
Light Middleweight (69 kg)	Wang Dongmei (CHN)	Monica Saun (IND)	Lê Thị Nhung (VIE)
Light Middleweight (69 kg)	Wang Dongmei (CHN)	Monica Saun (IND)	Dapana Durage Weerarathna (SRI)
Middleweight (75 kg)	Li Jinzi (CHN)	Pooja Rani (IND)	Kim Shin-hyeong (KOR)
Middleweight (75 kg)	Li Jinzi (CHN)	Pooja Rani (IND)	Paek Su-rim (PRK)
Light Heavyweight (81 kg)	Yuan Meiqing (CHN)	Yuldus Mamatkulova (KAZ)	Bhagyawati Kachari (IND)
Light Heavyweight (81 kg)	Yuan Meiqing (CHN)	Yuldus Mamatkulova (KAZ)	Bayasgalangiin Odmaa (MGL)
Heavyweight (+81 kg)	Li Yunfei (CHN)	Lyazzat Kungenbayeva (KAZ)	Kavita Chahal (IND)
Heavyweight (+81 kg)	Li Yunfei (CHN)	Lyazzat Kungenbayeva (KAZ)	Baljinnyamyn Badamkhand (MGL)

== Medal table ==
Rank	Nation	Gold	Silver	Bronze	Total
1	China (CHN)	5	2	3	10
2	India (IND)	2	4	2	8
3	Mongolia (MGL)	2	0	2	4
4	Thailand (THA)	1	0	0	1
5	Kazakhstan (KAZ)	0	2	2	4
6	North Korea (PRK)	0	1	2	3
7	Tajikistan (TJK)	0	1	0	1
8	Vietnam (VIE)	0	0	3	3
9	Philippines (PHI)	0	0	2	2
10	Chinese Taipei (TPE)	0	0	1	1
10	Japan (JPN)	0	0	1	1
10	South Korea (KOR)	0	0	1	1
10	Sri Lanka (SRI)	0	0	1	1
Totals (13 entries)		10	10	20	40
