= 2008 Asian Women's Amateur Boxing Championships =

Boxing competitions

The fourth edition of the Women's Asian Amateur Boxing Championships were held from September 23 to September 28, 2008 in Guwahati, India.

== Medalists ==
Event	Gold	Silver	Bronze
Pinweight (46 kg)	Jong Ok (PRK)	M.C. Mary Kom (IND)	Anusha Kodituwakku (SRI)
Pinweight (46 kg)	Jong Ok (PRK)	M.C. Mary Kom (IND)	Nguyen Thi Hoa (VIE)
Light flyweight (48 kg)	Chowdhury Kalpana (IND)	Ngo Thi Phuong (VIE)	Lin Wan Ting (TPE)
Light flyweight (48 kg)	Chowdhury Kalpana (IND)	Ngo Thi Phuong (VIE)	Ri Jong Hyang (PRK)
Flyweight (50 kg)	Li Siyuan (CHN)	Kim Hyung Ok (PRK)	Eun Jin Nam (KOR)
Flyweight (50 kg)	Li Siyuan (CHN)	Kim Hyung Ok (PRK)	Nilmini Jayasinghe (SRI)
Super Flyweight (52 kg)	Laishram Sarita Devi (IND)	Ren Cancan (CHN)	Tong Song Hye (PRK)
Super Flyweight (52 kg)	Laishram Sarita Devi (IND)	Ren Cancan (CHN)	Tesrendorj Eserenchimeg (MGL)
Bantamweight (54 kg)	Zhang Qin (CHN)	Ramilal Pavitra (IND)	Eun A Jang (KOR)
Bantamweight (54 kg)	Zhang Qin (CHN)	Ramilal Pavitra (IND)	Oksana Koroleva (KAZ)
Featherweight (57 kg)	Nagisettey Usha (IND)	Zhuldyzai Imanbayeva (KAZ)	Ngu Tai Chung (VIE)
Featherweight (57 kg)	Nagisettey Usha (IND)	Zhuldyzai Imanbayeva (KAZ)	Yun Kum Ju (PRK)
Lightweight (60 kg)	Kim Hye Yong (PRK)	Nguyen Thi Vui (VIE)	Su Wen Hsien (TPE)
Lightweight (60 kg)	Kim Hye Yong (PRK)	Nguyen Thi Vui (VIE)	Dong Cheng (CHN)
Light welterweight (63 kg)	Ri Hyon Hwa (PRK)	Ma Jianxia (CHN)	Anuradha Lama (NEP)
Light welterweight (63 kg)	Ri Hyon Hwa (PRK)	Ma Jianxia (CHN)	Saida Khasenova (KAZ)
Welterweight (66 kg)	Ri Suk Yong (PRK)	Kavita Goyat (IND)	Qian Wang (TPE)
Welterweight (66 kg)	Ri Suk Yong (PRK)	Kavita Goyat (IND)	Dariga Shakimova (KAZ)
Middleweight (70 kg)	Yang Tingting (CHN)	Jang Un Hui (PRK)	Seema Devi Yadav (IND)
Middleweight (70 kg)	Yang Tingting (CHN)	Jang Un Hui (PRK)	Deepa Chhetri (NEP)
Super Middleweight (75 kg)	Li Jinzi (CHN)	Gora Renu (IND)	Andaraweera Nilanthi (SRI)
Super Middleweight (75 kg)	Li Jinzi (CHN)	Gora Renu (IND)	Not Awarded
Light Heavyweight (80 kg)	Tang Jieli (CHN)	Lekha Kozhummel Chettadi (IND)	Not Awarded
Light Heavyweight (80 kg)	Tang Jieli (CHN)	Lekha Kozhummel Chettadi (IND)	Not Awarded
Heavyweight (86 kg)	Zhang Lina (CHN)	Kavita Chahal (IND)	Not Awarded
Heavyweight (86 kg)	Zhang Lina (CHN)	Kavita Chahal (IND)	Not Awarded

== Medal table ==
Rank	Nation	Gold	Silver	Bronze	Total
1	China (CHN)	6	2	1	9
2	North Korea (PRK)	4	2	3	9
3	India (IND)	3	6	1	10
4	Vietnam (VIE)	0	2	2	4
5	Kazakhstan (KAZ)	0	1	3	4
6	Chinese Taipei (TPE)	0	0	3	3
6	Sri Lanka (SRI)	0	0	3	3
8	Nepal (NEP)	0	0	2	2
8	South Korea (KOR)	0	0	2	2
10	Mongolia (MGL)	0	0	1	1
Totals (10 entries)		13	13	21	47
