= 2006 Women's World Amateur Boxing Championships =

Boxing competitions

- Location: New Delhi, India
- Dates: November 18–23, 2006

The 2006 Women's World Amateur Boxing Championships was an international women's boxing competition hosted by India from 18–23 November 2006 in New Delhi. It was the 4th championship, which started in 2001 in Scranton, Pennsylvania, US.

The World Championship was contested in thirteen weight disciplines by 180 amateur women boxers from 32 countries, and was conducted in the Talkatora Indoor Stadium.

India won four gold, one silver and three bronze medals, while Russia, last year's champion, finished second with three gold and three bronze medals, followed by North Korea with a tally of 2-0-1. Canadians, the runners-up in 2005 edition, were fourth with one gold and two bronze.

== Participating nations ==
- Algeria
- Argentina
- Australia
- Canada
- China
- Denmark
- Egypt
- Finland
- France
- Hungary
- India
- (Republic of Ireland) Ireland
- Israel
- Italy
- Kazakhstan
- Montenegro
- Morocco
- Netherlands
- New Zealand
- North Korea
- Norway
- Philippines
- Poland
- Romania
- Russia
- South Korea
- Sri Lanka
- Sweden
- Chinese Taipei
- Tunisia
- Turkey
- Ukraine
- (United States) US

== Results ==
Bronze medals are awarded to both losing semi-finalists.

2006 Women's World Boxing Championship
Weight	Gold	Silver	Bronze	
46 kg	(India) Mary Kom	(Romania) Steluța Duță	(North Korea) Jong Ok	(Kazakhstan) Nazgul Boranbayeva
48 kg	(North Korea) Ri Jong Hyang	(Argentina) Yésica Bopp	(Philippines) Alice Kate Aparri	(United States) Marlen Esparza
50 kg	(Turkey) Hasibe Erkoç	(China) Siyuan Li	(India) Chhotu Loura	(Denmark) Fadia el Idrissi
52 kg	(India) Sarita Devi	(Ukraine) Viktoria Rudenko	(Egypt) Samiha A Ali Hassan	(Poland) Jagoda Karge
54 kg	(Russia) Sofya Ochigava	(Poland) Karolina Michalczuk	(China) Zhang Qin	(Ukraine) Lyumdmyla Hrytsay
57 kg	(North Korea) Yum Kum Ju	(India) Usha Nagisetty	(China) Bin Wu	(Romania) Mihaela Cijevschi
60 kg	(Republic of Ireland) Katie Taylor	(Argentina) Érica Farías	(Philippines) Mitchel Martinez	(Russia) Tatiana Chalya
63 kg	(India) Jenny R. L.	(Sweden) Klara Svensson	(Canada) Katie Dunn	(Russia) Yulia Nemtsova
66 kg	(France) Aya Cissoko	(Ukraine) Oleksandra Kozlan	(India) Aruna Mishra	(Canada) Mary Spencer
70 kg	(Canada) Ariane Fortin	(United States) Akima Stocks	(Romania) Luminita Turcin	(Russia) Olga Slavinskaya
75 kg	(India) Lekha K.C.	(China) Jinzi Li	(Hungary) Anita Ducza	(Ukraine) Olga Novikova
80 kg	(Russia) Irina Sinetskaya	(United States) Chitiqua Hemingway	(India) Renu Gora	(Poland) Beata Malek
86 kg	(Russia) Elena Surkova	(Hungary) Mária Kovács	(Romania) Adriana Hosu	(Turkey) Şemsi Yaralı

== Medal count table ==
2006 Women's World Boxing Championship
Pos	Country	Gold	Silver	Bronze	Total
1	India	4	1	3	8
2	Russia	3		3	6
3	North Korea	2		1	3
4	Canada	1		2	3
5	Turkey	1		1	2
6	(Republic of Ireland) Ireland	1			1
6=	France	1			1
8	China		2	2	4
8=	Ukraine		2	2	4
10	(United States) US		2	1	3
11	Argentina		2		2
12	Romania		1	3	4
13	Poland		1	2	3
14	Hungary		1	1	2
15	Sweden		1		1
16	Philippines			2	2
17	Egypt			1	1
17=	Kazakhstan			1	1
17=	Denmark			1	1
	Total	13	13	26	52

== Competitions ==
=== Preliminary rounds ===
18 November 2006
Weight	Red		Blue
48 kg
	O Myloserdna (Ukraine)	RSCI R-3	(Canada) Valerie Bedard
	Monika Csik (Hungary)	19 – 8	(Italy) Laura Tosti
	Olesya G (Russia)	18 – 7	(Kazakhstan) Nargul B
	Ri Jong Hyang (North Korea)	RSCOS	(Algeria) Koufi Arbia
54 kg
	Ri Kwang Suk (North Korea)	23 – 22	(Canada) Lydia Walczak
	Preeti Beniwal (India)	9 – 24	(Poland) Karolina M
	A Issatayeva (Kazakhstan)	RSCOS	(Ukraine) L Hyrtsay
	E Klinefelter (United States)	7 – 20	(Turkey) Sabriye Sengül
	Sofya Ochigava (Russia)	RSCOS	(Australia) Jasmine D
	Kati Collander (Finland)	25 – 5	(Montenegro) B Erdengerel
57 kg
	Alexis P (New Zealand)	15 – 16	(Romania) Mihaela Cijevschi
	O Sydorenko (Ukraine)	8 – 26	(Turkey) Nagehan Gül
	Ronica Jeffery (United States)	13 – 19	(France) Myriam Dellal
60 kg
	Eva Wahlström (Finland)	18 – 4	(Kazakhstan) Valerya Kurluk
	Katie Taylor (Republic of Ireland)	RSCOS	(United States) Carolina Barry
66 kg
	Dawn Chalmers (New Zealand)	14 – 21	(France) Aya Cissoko
	Irina Poteyeva (Russia)	20 – 25	(Netherlands) Marichelle De
	Lisa Kuronya (United States)	18 – 26	(Canada) Mary Spencer
	Diana B (Kazakhstan)	RSCOS-2	(Montenegro) T Ariunjrgal
	Yan Zhong (China)	12 – 16	(Ukraine) Oleksandra Kozlan
	Anna Ingman (Sweden)	RSCOS	(Hungary) Bianka Nagy
70 kg
	Natalia O (Israel)	RSCOS	(Canada) Ariane Fortin
	Ting Ting Yang (China)	13 – 29	(Russia) Olga Slavinskaya
	Nurcan Çarkçi (Turkey)	RSCOS	(Egypt) Engi Saad M
75 kg
	Hatice Aliç (Turkey)	RSC	(Morocco) S Elhaddad
19 November 2006
Weight	Red		Blue
46 kg
	S Gnevanova (Russia)	RSCOS	(Ukraine) O Shtakun
	Rina Na (China)	25 – 16	(Italy) E V Calabres
	N Branbayeva (Kazakhstan)	12 – 8	(Turkey) Derya Aktop
	Sofia Moelholt (Denmark)	28 – 26	(Taiwan) Chou Hsin Chen
	Hrim Rezk (Egypt)	RSCOS	(Romania) Steluta Duta
48 kg
	Camelia Negrea (Romania)	4 – 12	(Argentina) Yesica Bopp
	C Kalpana (India)	24 – 7	(Egypt) Nadia Shehata
	G Nandintsetse (Montenegro)	12 – 22	(Philippines) Alice Katea
	Wensi Huang (China)	13 – 10	(Poland) P Ewlina
	G Basibütün (Turkey)	23 – 24	(United States) Marlen Esparza
	Jenny Hardingz (Sweden)	13 – 13	(Sri Lanka) A Tuwakku
	O Myloserdna (Ukraine)	13 – 26	(Hungary) Monika Csik
	Olesya G (Russia)	10 – 16	(North Korea) Ri Jong Hyang
57 kg
	Yum Kum Zu (North Korea)	15 – 8	(Russia) Elena G
	Z Szuknia (Hungary)	20 – 9	(Morocco) Ikram Salem
	L G Munkhjarga (Montenegro)	RSC R-1	(North Korea) Mi Sun Yu
	Chien Hsin Tzu (Taiwan)	8 – 20	(China) Bin Wu
	Ingrid Egner (Norway)	16 – 15	(Poland) Anna Kasprzak
	Sandra Bizier (Canada)	14 – 20	(India) N Usha
	Izhuldazai (Kazakhstan)	10 – 22	(Romania) Mihaela Cijevschi
	Nagehan Gül (Turkey)	26 – 12	(France) Myriam Dellal

=== Semifinals ===
22 November 2006
Weight	Red		Blue
46 kg
	M C Mary Kom (India)	20 – 8	(North Korea) Jong Ok
	Nazgul Boranbayeva (Kazakhstan)	RSCOS	(Romania) Steluta Duta
48 kg
	Yesica Bopp (Argentina)	16 – 9	(Philippines) Alice Kate Aparri
	Marlen Esparz (United States)	RSCOS	(North Korea) Ri Jong Hyang
50 kg
	Chhoutu Loura (India)	8 – 17	(Turkey) Hasibe Erkoç
	Siyuan Li (China)	25 – 6	(Denmark) Fadia El Idrissi Aparri
52 kg
	Sarita Devi (India)	RSCOS	(Egypt) Samiha A Ali Hassan
	Jagoda Karge (Poland)	RSCOS	(Ukraine) Viktoria Rudenko
54 kg
	Qin Zhang (China)	11 – 17	(Poland) Karolina Mihalczuk
	Lyumdmyla Hyrtsay (Ukraine)	4 – 21	(Russia) Sofya Ochigava
57 kg
	Yum Kum Ju (North Korea)	23 – 4	(China) Bin Wu
	N Usha (India)	15 – 10	(Romania) Mihaela Cijevschi
60 kg
	Anabella Farias (Argentina)	18 – 13	(Philippines) Mitchel Martinez
	Tatiana Chalya (Russia)	6 – 23	(Republic of Ireland) Katie Taylor
63 kg
	Jenny R L (India)	25 – 19	(Canada) Katie Dunn

=== Finals ===
23 November 2006
Weight	Red		Blue
48 kg	Yesica Bopp (Argentina)		(North Korea) Ri Jong Hyang
50 kg	Hasibe Erkoç (Turkey)	18 – 12	(China) Siyuan Li
54 kg	Karolina Mihalczuk (Poland)		(Russia) Sofya Ochigava
60 kg	Anabella Farias (Argentina)		(Republic of Ireland) Katie Taylor
63 kg	Jenny R L (India)		(Sweden) Klara Svensson
66 kg	Aya Cissoko (France)		(Ukraine) Oleksandra Kozlan
70 kg	Akima Stocks (United States)		(Canada) Ariane Fortin
75 kg	C Lekha (India)		(China) Jinzi Li
80 kg	Chitiqua Hemingway (United States)		(Russia) Irina Sinetskaya
86 kg	Maria Kovacs (Hungary)		(Russia) Elena Surkova
46 kg	M C Mary Kom (India)		(Romania) Steluta Duta
52 kg	Sarita Devi (India)		(Ukraine) Viktoria Rudenko
57 kg	Yum Kum Ju (North Korea)		(India) N Usha

Abbreviations

- RSCOS: Referee Stopped Contest Out Scored
- RSCI: Referee Stopped Contest Injury
