= Zhang Xiyan =

Chinese boxer (born 1980)

Personal information
- Nationality: China
- Born: 22 April 1980 (age 46) Harbin, China
- Height: 5 ft 4 in (1.63 m)
- Weight: Bantamweight

Boxing career
Medal record
Representing China
Women's boxing
Women's World Amateur Boxing Championships
Gold medal – first place	2002 Antalya	54 kg
Asian Women's Championship
Bronze medal – third place	2003 Hisar	54 kg

Zhang Xiyan (simplified Chinese: 张喜燕; traditional Chinese: 張喜燕; pinyin: Zhāng Xǐyàn; born April 22, 1980) is a Chinese professional amateur and professional boxer. She won a gold medal at the 2002 Women's World Amateur Boxing Championships in the bantamweight class (54 kg). Zhang won the WBA and WIBA world titles, respectively, in 2006 and 2007. She claimed China's first professional boxing world champion.
