= Asian Amateur Boxing Championships =

Boxing competitions

The Asian Amateur Boxing Championships is the highest competition for boxing amateurs in Asia. The first tournament took place in 1963, hosted by Bangkok, Thailand.

== Men's editions ==
Edition	Year	Host city	Champion	Ref.
1	1963	Bangkok, Thailand	Japan (3 G)	
2	1965	Seoul, South Korea	South Korea (8 G)	
3	1967	(Dominion of Ceylon) Colombo, Ceylon	South Korea (4 G)	
4	1970	Manila, Philippines	South Korea (5 G)	
5	1971	Tehran, Iran	Iran (3 G)	
6	1973	Bangkok, Thailand	Thailand (5 G)	
7	1975	Yokohama, Japan	Japan (6 G)	
8	1977	Jakarta, Indonesia	Iran (4 G)	
9	1980	Bombay, India	South Korea (3 G)	
10	1982	Seoul, South Korea	South Korea (7 G)	
11	1983	Okinawa, Japan	South Korea (6 G)	
12	1985	Bangkok, Thailand	South Korea (7 G)	
13	1987	Kuwait, Kuwait	South Korea (8 G)	
14	1989	Beijing, China	South Korea (7 G)	
15	1991	Bangkok, Thailand	Thailand (6 G)	
16	1992	Bangkok, Thailand	South Korea (6 G)	
17	1994	Tehran, Iran	Kazakhstan (5 G)	
18	1995	Tashkent, Uzbekistan	Kazakhstan (6 G)	
19	1997	Kuala Lumpur, Malaysia	Thailand (4 G)	
20	1999	Tashkent, Uzbekistan	Uzbekistan (7 G)	
21	2002	Seremban, Malaysia	Uzbekistan (5 G)	
22	2004	Puerto Princesa, Philippines	Kazakhstan (3 G)	
23	2005	Ho Chi Minh City, Vietnam	Pakistan (3 G)	
24	2007	Ulaanbaatar, Mongolia	Uzbekistan (3 G)	
25	2009	Zhuhai, China	China (3 G)	
26	2011	Incheon, South Korea	China (2 G)	
27	2013	Amman, Jordan	Kazakhstan (7 G)	
28	2015	Bangkok, Thailand	Kazakhstan (5 G)	
29	2017	Tashkent, Uzbekistan	Uzbekistan (9 G)	

== Women's editions ==
Edition	Year	Host city	Champion
1	2001	Bangkok, Thailand	North Korea (5 G)
2	2003	Hissar, India	North Korea (6 G)
3	2005	Kaohsiung, Taiwan	India (7 G)
4	2008	Guwahati, India	China (6 G)
5	2010	Astana, Kazakhstan	Kazakhstan (4 G)
6	2012	Ulaanbaatar, Mongolia	China (5 G)
7	2015	Wulanchabu, China	China (6 G)
8	2017	Ho Chi Minh City, Vietnam	China (4 G)

== Combined editions ==
Edition	Year	Host city	Champion
30	2019	Bangkok, Thailand	China (6 G)
31	2021	Dubai, United Arab Emirates	Kazakhstan (8 G)
32	2022	Amman, Jordan	Kazakhstan (6 G)
33	2024	Chiang Mai, Thailand	Uzbekistan (10 G)

== All-time medal table ==
=== 1992–2024 ===
Rank	Nation	Gold	Silver	Bronze	Total
1	Kazakhstan	68	40	60	168
2	Uzbekistan	54	40	37	131
3	China	37	27	33	97
4	India	20	37	50	107
5	Thailand	19	14	29	62
6	North Korea	18	13	13	44
7	South Korea	16	21	29	66
8	Mongolia	9	10	28	47
9	Iran	7	14	23	44
10	Pakistan	6	3	6	15
11	Philippines	5	12	15	32
12	Jordan	2	7	6	15
13	Chinese Taipei	2	6	12	20
14	Tajikistan	2	3	10	15
15	Vietnam	1	9	8	18
16	Japan	1	7	9	17
17	Turkmenistan	1	3	8	12
18	Kyrgyzstan	1	0	13	14
19	Malaysia	1	0	2	3
19	Syria	1	0	2	3
–	Ukraine (Guest)	0	2	11	13
21	Afghanistan	0	1	1	2
22	Indonesia	0	1	0	1
23	Sri Lanka	0	0	3	3
24	Iraq	0	0	2	2
24	Kuwait	0	0	2	2
24	United Arab Emirates	0	0	2	2
27	Cambodia	0	0	1	1
27	Lebanon	0	0	1	1
27	Myanmar	0	0	1	1
27	Saudi Arabia	0	0	1	1
Totals (30 entries)		271	270	418	959

== See also ==
- Boxing at the Asian Games
