= List of medalists at the IBA Women's World Boxing Championships =

This is a list of medalists at the IBA Women's World Boxing Championships.

== Pinweight ==
- −45 kg: 2001–2002
- −46 kg: 2005–2008

Games	Gold	Silver	Bronze
2001 Scranton	Yelena Sabitova; Russia	Maria Norozenik; Hungary	Camelia Negrea; Romania
2001 Scranton	Yelena Sabitova; Russia	Maria Norozenik; Hungary	Kim Peturson; Canada
2002 Antalya	Mary Kom; India	Jang Song-ae; North Korea	Derya Aktop; Turkey
2002 Antalya	Mary Kom; India	Jang Song-ae; North Korea	Svetlana Miroshnichenko; Ukraine
2005 Podolsk	Mary Kom; India	Jong Ok; North Korea	Gretchen Abaniel; Philippines
2005 Podolsk	Mary Kom; India	Jong Ok; North Korea	Yelena Sabitova; Russia
2006 New Delhi	Mary Kom; India	Steluța Duță; Romania	Jong Ok; North Korea
2006 New Delhi	Mary Kom; India	Steluța Duță; Romania	Nazgul Boranbayeva; Kazakhstan
2008 Ningbo City	Mary Kom; India	Steluța Duță; Romania	Josie Gabuco; Philippines
2008 Ningbo City	Mary Kom; India	Steluța Duță; Romania	Jong Ok; North Korea

== Minimumweight ==
- −48 kg: 2022–

Games	Gold	Silver	Bronze
2022 Istanbul	Ayşe Çağırır; Turkey	Alua Balkibekova; Kazakhstan	Aldana López; Argentina
2022 Istanbul	Ayşe Çağırır; Turkey	Alua Balkibekova; Kazakhstan	Sevda Asenova; Bulgaria
2023 New Delhi	Nitu Ghanghas; India	Lutsaikhany Altantsetseg; Mongolia	Alua Balkibekova; Kazakhstan
2023 New Delhi	Nitu Ghanghas; India	Lutsaikhany Altantsetseg; Mongolia	Yasmine Mouttaki; Morocco
2025 Niš	Nazym Kyzaibay; Kazakhstan	Iuliia Chumgalakova; Russia	Farzona Fozilova; Uzbekistan
2025 Niš	Nazym Kyzaibay; Kazakhstan	Iuliia Chumgalakova; Russia	Hong Kyong-ryong; North Korea

== Light flyweight ==
- −48 kg: 2001–2019
- −50 kg: 2022–

Games	Gold	Silver	Bronze
2001 Scranton	Hülya Şahin; Turkey	Mary Kom; India	Jamie Behl; Canada
2001 Scranton	Hülya Şahin; Turkey	Mary Kom; India	Carina Moreno; United States
2002 Antalya	Ri Jong-hyang; North Korea	Tatyana Lebedeva; Ukraine	Monica Csik; Hungary
2002 Antalya	Ri Jong-hyang; North Korea	Tatyana Lebedeva; Ukraine	Kumari Meena; India
2005 Podolsk	Olesya Gladkova; Russia	Ri Jong-hyang; North Korea	Yesica Bopp; Argentina
2005 Podolsk	Olesya Gladkova; Russia	Ri Jong-hyang; North Korea	Camelia Negrea; Romania
2006 New Delhi	Ri Jong-hyang; North Korea	Yesica Bopp; Argentina	Alice Aparri; Philippines
2006 New Delhi	Ri Jong-hyang; North Korea	Yesica Bopp; Argentina	Marlen Esparza; United States
2008 Ningbo City (Note: Chen Ying of China, who originally won gold, was disqualified for failing a doping test.)	Sarah Ourahmoune; France	Alexandra Kuleshova; Russia	Jenny Haedingz; Sweden
2008 Ningbo City	Sarah Ourahmoune; France	Alexandra Kuleshova; Russia	Vacant
2010 Bridgetown	Mary Kom; India	Steluța Duță; Romania	Nazgul Boranbayeva; Kazakhstan
2010 Bridgetown	Mary Kom; India	Steluța Duță; Romania	Alice Aparri; Philippines
2012 Qinhuangdao	Josie Gabuco; Philippines	Xu Shiqi; China	Svetlana Gnevanova; Russia
2012 Qinhuangdao	Josie Gabuco; Philippines	Xu Shiqi; China	Nazym Kyzaibay; Kazakhstan
2014 Jeju City	Nazym Kyzaibay; Kazakhstan	Sarjubala Devi; India	Chuthamat Raksat; Thailand
2014 Jeju City	Nazym Kyzaibay; Kazakhstan	Sarjubala Devi; India	Madoka Wada; Japan
2016 Astana	Nazym Kyzaibay; Kazakhstan	Wang Yuyan; China	Marlen Esparza; United States
2016 Astana	Nazym Kyzaibay; Kazakhstan	Wang Yuyan; China	U Yong-gum; North Korea
2018 New Delhi	Mary Kom; India	Hanna Okhota; Ukraine	Kim Hyang-mi; North Korea
2018 New Delhi	Mary Kom; India	Hanna Okhota; Ukraine	Madoka Wada; Japan
2019 Ulan-Ude	Ekaterina Paltceva; Russia	Manju Rani; India	Chuthamat Raksat; Thailand
2019 Ulan-Ude	Ekaterina Paltceva; Russia	Manju Rani; India	Demie-Jade Resztan; England
2022 Istanbul	Buse Naz Çakıroğlu; Turkey	Ingrit Valencia; Colombia	Aziza Yokubova; Uzbekistan
2022 Istanbul	Buse Naz Çakıroğlu; Turkey	Ingrit Valencia; Colombia	Laura Fuertes; Spain
2023 New Delhi	Nikhat Zareen; India	Nguyễn Thị Tâm; Vietnam	Ingrit Valencia; Colombia
2023 New Delhi	Nikhat Zareen; India	Nguyễn Thị Tâm; Vietnam	Wassila Lkhadiri; France
2025 Niš	Alua Balkibekova; Kazakhstan	Hu Meiyi; China	Sabina Bobokulova; Uzbekistan
2025 Niš	Alua Balkibekova; Kazakhstan	Hu Meiyi; China	An Kum-byol; North Korea

== Flyweight ==
- −51 kg: 2001–2002
- −50 kg: 2005–2008
- −51 kg: 2010–2019
- −52 kg: 2022–

Games	Gold	Silver	Bronze
2001 Scranton	Simona Galassi; Italy	Tammy DeLaforest; Canada	Katrin Enoksson; Sweden
2001 Scranton	Simona Galassi; Italy	Tammy DeLaforest; Canada	Diana Ungureanu; Romania
2002 Antalya	Simona Galassi; Italy	Kim Kun-son; North Korea	Lidiya Andreyeva; Russia
2002 Antalya	Simona Galassi; Italy	Kim Kun-son; North Korea	Elefheria Paleologou; Greece
2005 Podolsk	Simona Galassi; Italy	Ri Hyang-mi; North Korea	Kalpana Chowdhury; India
2005 Podolsk	Simona Galassi; Italy	Ri Hyang-mi; North Korea	Viktoriya Usachenko; Russia
2006 New Delhi	Hasibe Erkoç; Turkey	Siyuan Li; China	Chhotu Loura; India
2006 New Delhi	Hasibe Erkoç; Turkey	Siyuan Li; China	Fadia el Idrissi; Denmark
2008 Ningbo City	Kim Hyang-ok; North Korea	Elena Savelyeva; Russia	Chhotu Loura; India
2008 Ningbo City	Kim Hyang-ok; North Korea	Elena Savelyeva; Russia	Analisa Cruz; Philippines
2010 Bridgetown	Ren Cancan; China	Nicola Adams; England	Tetyana Kob; Ukraine
2010 Bridgetown	Ren Cancan; China	Nicola Adams; England	Hanne Mäkinen; Finland
2012 Qinhuangdao	Ren Cancan; China	Nicola Adams; England	Karolina Michalczuk; Poland
2012 Qinhuangdao	Ren Cancan; China	Nicola Adams; England	Elena Savelyeva; Russia
2014 Jeju City	Marlen Esparza; United States	Lisa Whiteside; England	Terry Gordini; Italy
2014 Jeju City	Marlen Esparza; United States	Lisa Whiteside; England	Clelia Marques; Brazil
2016 Astana	Nicola Adams; Great Britain	Peamwilai Laopeam; Thailand	Zhaina Shekerbekova; Kazakhstan
2016 Astana	Nicola Adams; Great Britain	Peamwilai Laopeam; Thailand	Sarah Ourahmoune; France
2018 New Delhi	Pang Chol-mi; North Korea	Zhaina Shekerbekova; Kazakhstan	Virginia Fuchs; United States
2018 New Delhi	Pang Chol-mi; North Korea	Zhaina Shekerbekova; Kazakhstan	Tsukimi Namiki; Japan
2019 Ulan-Ude	Liliya Aetbaeva; Russia	Buse Naz Çakıroğlu; Turkey	Pang Chol-mi; North Korea
2019 Ulan-Ude	Liliya Aetbaeva; Russia	Buse Naz Çakıroğlu; Turkey	Mary Kom; India
2022 Istanbul	Nikhat Zareen; India	Jutamas Jitpong; Thailand	Zhaina Shekerbekova; Kazakhstan
2022 Istanbul	Nikhat Zareen; India	Jutamas Jitpong; Thailand	Caroline de Almeida; Brazil
2023 New Delhi	Wu Yu; China	Sirine Charaabi; Italy	Yuliya Apanasovich; Belarus
2023 New Delhi	Wu Yu; China	Sirine Charaabi; Italy	Rinka Kinoshita; Japan
2025 Niš	Pang Chol-mi; North Korea	Buse Naz Çakıroğlu; Turkey	Dragana Jovanović; Serbia
2025 Niš	Pang Chol-mi; North Korea	Buse Naz Çakıroğlu; Turkey	Feruza Kazakova; Uzbekistan

== Light bantamweight ==
- −52 kg: 2005–2008

Games	Gold	Silver	Bronze
2005 Podolsk	Sofya Ochigava; Russia	Sümeyra Kaya; Turkey	Viktoriya Rudenko; Ukraine
2005 Podolsk	Sofya Ochigava; Russia	Sümeyra Kaya; Turkey	Samiha Yassan; Egypt
2006 New Delhi	Sarita Devi; India	Viktoria Rudenko; Ukraine	Samiha Yassan; Egypt
2006 New Delhi	Sarita Devi; India	Viktoria Rudenko; Ukraine	Jagoda Karge; Poland
2008 Ningbo City	Ren Cancan; China	Annie Albania; Philippines	Viktoriya Rudenko; Ukraine
2008 Ningbo City	Ren Cancan; China	Annie Albania; Philippines	Sarita Devi; India

== Bantamweight ==
- −54 kg: 2001–

Games	Gold	Silver	Bronze
2001 Scranton	Yelena Karpecheva; Russia	Audrey Garcia; France	Wendy Broad; Canada
2001 Scranton	Yelena Karpecheva; Russia	Audrey Garcia; France	Renate Medby; Norway
2002 Antalya	Zhang Xiyan; China	Marzia Davide; Italy	Son Bi-ha; North Korea
2002 Antalya	Zhang Xiyan; China	Marzia Davide; Italy	Agnes Tapai; Hungary
2005 Podolsk	Mihaela Cijevschi; Romania	Dina Burger; Switzerland	Sarita Devi; India
2005 Podolsk	Mihaela Cijevschi; Romania	Dina Burger; Switzerland	Pak Kyong-ok; North Korea
2006 New Delhi	Sofya Ochigava; Russia	Karolina Michalczuk; Poland	Zhang Qin; China
2006 New Delhi	Sofya Ochigava; Russia	Karolina Michalczuk; Poland	Lyumdmyla Hrytsay; Ukraine
2008 Ningbo City	Karolina Michalczuk; Poland	Nicola Adams; England	Zhang Qin; China
2008 Ningbo City	Karolina Michalczuk; Poland	Nicola Adams; England	Cynthia Moreno; United States
2010 Bridgetown	Elena Savelyeva; Russia	Kim Hye-song; North Korea	Csilla Némedi-Varga; Hungary
2010 Bridgetown	Elena Savelyeva; Russia	Kim Hye-song; North Korea	Karolina Michalczuk; Poland
2012 Qinhuangdao	Aleksandra Kuleshova; Russia	Terry Gordini; Italy	Liu Kejia; China
2012 Qinhuangdao	Aleksandra Kuleshova; Russia	Terry Gordini; Italy	Christina Cruz; United States
2014 Jeju City	Stanimira Petrova; Bulgaria	Marzia Davide; Italy	Ayşe Taş; Turkey
2014 Jeju City	Stanimira Petrova; Bulgaria	Marzia Davide; Italy	Elena Savelyeva; Russia
2016 Astana	Dina Zholaman; Kazakhstan	Stoyka Petrova; Bulgaria	Christina Cruz; United States
2016 Astana	Dina Zholaman; Kazakhstan	Stoyka Petrova; Bulgaria	Liu Piaopiao; China
2018 New Delhi	Lin Yu-ting; Chinese Taipei	Stoyka Petrova; Bulgaria	Kristy Harris; Australia
2018 New Delhi	Lin Yu-ting; Chinese Taipei	Stoyka Petrova; Bulgaria	Myagmardulamyn Nandintsetseg; Mongolia
2019 Ulan-Ude	Huang Hsiao-wen; Chinese Taipei	Caroline Cruveillier; France	Jamuna Boro; India
2019 Ulan-Ude	Huang Hsiao-wen; Chinese Taipei	Caroline Cruveillier; France	Mikiah Kreps; United States
2022 Istanbul	Hatice Akbaş; Turkey	Lăcrămioara Perijoc; Romania	Dina Zholaman; Kazakhstan
2022 Istanbul	Hatice Akbaş; Turkey	Lăcrămioara Perijoc; Romania	Preedakamon Tintabthai; Thailand
2023 New Delhi	Huang Hsiao-wen; Chinese Taipei	Yeni Arias; Colombia	Jutamas Jitpong; Thailand
2023 New Delhi	Huang Hsiao-wen; Chinese Taipei	Yeni Arias; Colombia	Möngöntsetsegiin Enkhjargal; Mongolia
2025 Niš	Widad Bertal; Morocco	Hatice Akbaş; Turkey	Sara Ćirković; Serbia
2025 Niš	Widad Bertal; Morocco	Hatice Akbaş; Turkey	Natnicha Chongprongklang; Thailand

== Featherweight ==
- −57 kg: 2001–

Games	Gold	Silver	Bronze
2001 Scranton	Zhang Maomao; China	Henriette Birkeland Kitel; Norway	Jeannine Garside; Canada
2001 Scranton	Zhang Maomao; China	Henriette Birkeland Kitel; Norway	Alexandra Matheus; Denmark
2002 Antalya	Jo Pok-sun; North Korea	Henriette Birkeland Kitel; Norway	Svetlana Kulakova; Russia
2002 Antalya	Jo Pok-sun; North Korea	Henriette Birkeland Kitel; Norway	Maria Semertzoglu; Greece
2005 Podolsk	Yelena Karpacheva; Russia	Yun Kum-ju; North Korea	Sandra Bizier; Canada
2005 Podolsk	Yelena Karpacheva; Russia	Yun Kum-ju; North Korea	Zsuzsana-Beata Szuknai; Hungary
2006 New Delhi	Yun Kum-ju; North Korea	Usha Nagisetty; India	Bin Wu; China
2006 New Delhi	Yun Kum-ju; North Korea	Usha Nagisetty; India	Mihaela Cijevschi; Romania
2008 Ningbo City	Qin Jian; China	Usha Nagisetty; India	Edina Pezdany; Hungary
2008 Ningbo City	Qin Jian; China	Usha Nagisetty; India	Sofya Ochigava; Russia
2010 Bridgetown	Yun Kum-ju; North Korea	Yang Yanzi; China	Tassamalee Thongjan; Thailand
2010 Bridgetown	Yun Kum-ju; North Korea	Yang Yanzi; China	Rim Jouini; Tunisia
2012 Qinhuangdao	Tiara Brown; United States	Sandra Kruk; Poland	Svetlana Staneva; Bulgaria
2012 Qinhuangdao	Tiara Brown; United States	Sandra Kruk; Poland	Lisa Whiteside; England
2014 Jeju City	Zinaida Dobrynina; Russia	Nesthy Petecio; Philippines	Tiara Brown; United States
2014 Jeju City	Zinaida Dobrynina; Russia	Nesthy Petecio; Philippines	Alessia Mesiano; Italy
2016 Astana	Alessia Mesiano; Italy	Sonia Lather; India	Denitsa Eliseeva; Bulgaria
2016 Astana	Alessia Mesiano; Italy	Sonia Lather; India	Aizhan Khojabekova; Kazakhstan
2018 New Delhi	Ornella Wahner; Germany	Sonia Chahal; India	Jemyma Betrian; Netherlands
2018 New Delhi	Ornella Wahner; Germany	Sonia Chahal; India	Jo Son-hwa; North Korea
2019 Ulan-Ude	Nesthy Petecio; Philippines	Liudmila Vorontsova; Russia	Lin Yu-ting; Chinese Taipei
2019 Ulan-Ude	Nesthy Petecio; Philippines	Liudmila Vorontsova; Russia	Karriss Artingstall; England
2022 Istanbul	Lin Yu-ting; Chinese Taipei	Irma Testa; Italy	Karina Ibragimova; Kazakhstan
2022 Istanbul	Lin Yu-ting; Chinese Taipei	Irma Testa; Italy	Manisha Moun; India
2023 New Delhi	Irma Testa; Italy	Karina Ibragimova; Kazakhstan	Amina Zidani; France
2023 New Delhi	Irma Testa; Italy	Karina Ibragimova; Kazakhstan	Svetlana Staneva (Note: Lin Yu-ting of Chinese Taipei, who originally won bronze, was disqualified after failing to meet gender eligibility rules.); Bulgaria
2025 Niš	Anđela Branković; Serbia	Punrawee Ruenros; Thailand	Cai Yan; China
2025 Niš	Anđela Branković; Serbia	Punrawee Ruenros; Thailand	Esra Yıldız; Turkey

== Lightweight ==
- −60 kg: 2001–

Games	Gold	Silver	Bronze
2001 Scranton	Crystelle Samson; Canada	Tatyana Chalaya; Russia	Teuta Cuni; Sweden
2001 Scranton	Crystelle Samson; Canada	Tatyana Chalaya; Russia	Amber Gideon; United States
2002 Antalya	Jennifer Smith-Ogg; Canada	Areti Mastroduka; Greece	Ana Santos; Brazil
2002 Antalya	Jennifer Smith-Ogg; Canada	Areti Mastroduka; Greece	Naquana Smalls; United States
2005 Podolsk	Tatyana Chalaya; Russia	Gülsüm Tatar; Turkey	Kang Kum-hui; North Korea
2005 Podolsk	Tatyana Chalaya; Russia	Gülsüm Tatar; Turkey	Mitchel Martinez; Philippines
2006 New Delhi	Katie Taylor; Ireland	Érica Farías; Argentina	Mitchel Martinez; Philippines
2006 New Delhi	Katie Taylor; Ireland	Érica Farías; Argentina	Tatyana Chalaya; Russia
2008 Ningbo City	Katie Taylor; Ireland	Dong Cheng; China	Cindy Orain; France
2008 Ningbo City	Katie Taylor; Ireland	Dong Cheng; China	Ayzanat Gadzhieva; Russia
2010 Bridgetown	Katie Taylor; Ireland	Dong Cheng; China	Quanitta Underwood; United States
2010 Bridgetown	Katie Taylor; Ireland	Dong Cheng; China	Karolina Graczyk; Poland
2012 Qinhuangdao	Katie Taylor; Ireland	Sofya Ochigava; Russia	Mavzuna Chorieva; Tajikistan
2012 Qinhuangdao	Katie Taylor; Ireland	Sofya Ochigava; Russia	Natasha Jonas; England
2014 Jeju City	Katie Taylor; Ireland	Yana Alekseevna; Azerbaijan	Yin Junhua; China
2014 Jeju City	Katie Taylor; Ireland	Yana Alekseevna; Azerbaijan	Estelle Mossely; France
2016 Astana	Estelle Mossely; France	Anastasia Belyakova; Russia	Katie Taylor; Ireland
2016 Astana	Estelle Mossely; France	Anastasia Belyakova; Russia	Mira Potkonen; Finland
2018 New Delhi	Kellie Harrington; Ireland	Sudaporn Seesondee; Thailand	Karina Ibragimova; Kazakhstan
2018 New Delhi	Kellie Harrington; Ireland	Sudaporn Seesondee; Thailand	Oh Yeon-ji; South Korea
2019 Ulan-Ude	Beatriz Ferreira; Brazil	Wang Cong; China	Mira Potkonen; Finland
2019 Ulan-Ude	Beatriz Ferreira; Brazil	Wang Cong; China	Rashida Ellis; United States
2022 Istanbul	Rashida Ellis; United States	Beatriz Ferreira; Brazil	Alessia Mesiano; Italy
2022 Istanbul	Rashida Ellis; United States	Beatriz Ferreira; Brazil	Donjeta Sadiku; Kosovo
2023 New Delhi	Beatriz Ferreira; Brazil	Angie Valdés; Colombia	Oh Yeon-ji; South Korea
2023 New Delhi	Beatriz Ferreira; Brazil	Angie Valdés; Colombia	Yang Wenlu; China
2025 Niš	Nune Asatryan; Russia	Viktoriya Grafeyeva; Kazakhstan	Natalia Shadrina; Serbia
2025 Niš	Nune Asatryan; Russia	Viktoriya Grafeyeva; Kazakhstan	Miroslava Jedináková; Slovakia

== Light welterweight ==
- −63.5 kg: 2001–2002
- −63 kg: 2005–2008
- −64 kg: 2010–2019
- −63 kg: 2022–

Games	Gold	Silver	Bronze
2001 Scranton	Frida Wallberg; Sweden	Myriam Lamare; France	Cristina Cerpi; Italy
2001 Scranton	Frida Wallberg; Sweden	Myriam Lamare; France	Donna Mancuso; Canada
2002 Antalya	Myriam Lamare; France	Yasemin Ustalar; Turkey	Daniela David; Romania
2002 Antalya	Myriam Lamare; France	Yasemin Ustalar; Turkey	Saida Gasanova; Ukraine
2005 Podolsk	Yulia Nemtsova; Russia	Cecilia Brækhus; Norway	Kathleen Dunn; Canada
2005 Podolsk	Yulia Nemtsova; Russia	Cecilia Brækhus; Norway	Vinni Skovgaard; Denmark
2006 New Delhi	Jenny R. L. India	Klara Svensson; Sweden	Katie Dunn; Canada
2006 New Delhi	Jenny R. L. India	Klara Svensson; Sweden	Yulia Nemtsova; Russia
2008 Ningbo City	Gülsüm Tatar; Turkey	Liubov Lopatina; Russia	Klara Svensson; Sweden
2008 Ningbo City	Gülsüm Tatar; Turkey	Liubov Lopatina; Russia	Ma Jianxia; China
2010 Bridgetown	Gülsüm Tatar; Turkey	Vera Slugina; Russia	Klara Svensson; Sweden
2010 Bridgetown	Gülsüm Tatar; Turkey	Vera Slugina; Russia	Cashmere Jackson; United States
2012 Qinhuangdao	Pak Kyong-ok; North Korea	Magdalena Stelmach; Poland	Mikaela Mayer; United States
2012 Qinhuangdao	Pak Kyong-ok; North Korea	Magdalena Stelmach; Poland	Daria Abramova; Russia
2014 Jeju City	Anastasia Belyakova; Russia	Sandy Ryan; England	Shim Hee-jung; South Korea
2014 Jeju City	Anastasia Belyakova; Russia	Sandy Ryan; England	Sudaporn Seesondee; Thailand
2016 Astana	Yang Wenlu; China	Kellie Harrington; Ireland	Sara Kali; Canada
2016 Astana	Yang Wenlu; China	Kellie Harrington; Ireland	Skye Nicolson; Australia
2018 New Delhi	Dou Dan; China	Mariia Bova; Ukraine	Simranjit Kaur; India
2018 New Delhi	Dou Dan; China	Mariia Bova; Ukraine	Sema Çalışkan; Turkey
2019 Ulan-Ude	Dou Dan; China	Angela Carini; Italy	Ekaterina Dynnik; Russia
2019 Ulan-Ude	Dou Dan; China	Angela Carini; Italy	Milana Safronova; Kazakhstan
2022 Istanbul	Amy Broadhurst; Ireland	Imane Khelif; Algeria	Parveen Hooda; India
2022 Istanbul	Amy Broadhurst; Ireland	Imane Khelif; Algeria	Chelsey Heijnen; Netherlands
2023 New Delhi	Yang Chengyu; China	Nataliya Sychugova; Russia	Camila Camilo; Colombia
2023 New Delhi	Yang Chengyu; China	Nataliya Sychugova; Russia	Fatia Benmessahel; France
2025 Niš	Aida Abikeyeva; Kazakhstan	Thananya Somnuek; Thailand	Hà Thị Linh; Vietnam
2025 Niš	Aida Abikeyeva; Kazakhstan	Thananya Somnuek; Thailand	Elena Babicheva; Russia

== Welterweight ==
- −67 kg: 2001–2002
- −66 kg: 2005–2008
- −69 kg: 2010–2019
- −66 kg: 2022–

Games	Gold	Silver	Bronze
2001 Scranton	Irina Sinetskaya; Russia	Natalie Brown; Jamaica	Melanie Horne; New Zealand
2001 Scranton	Irina Sinetskaya; Russia	Natalie Brown; Jamaica	Tristan Whiston; Canada
2002 Antalya	Irina Sinetskaya; Russia	Natalie Brown; United States	Tina Hansen; Denmark
2002 Antalya	Irina Sinetskaya; Russia	Natalie Brown; United States	Desi Kontos; Australia
2005 Podolsk	Mary Spencer; Canada	Irina Sinetskaya; Russia	Yvonne Rasmussen; Denmark
2005 Podolsk	Mary Spencer; Canada	Irina Sinetskaya; Russia	Oleksandra Kozlan; Ukraine
2006 New Delhi	Aya Cissoko; France	Oleksandra Kozlan; Ukraine	Aruna Mishra; India
2006 New Delhi	Aya Cissoko; France	Oleksandra Kozlan; Ukraine	Mary Spencer; Canada
2008 Ningbo City	Mary Spencer; Canada	Vanessa Jackson; United States	Wang Qian; China
2008 Ningbo City	Mary Spencer; Canada	Vanessa Jackson; United States	Suk Yong-ri; North Korea
2010 Bridgetown	Andrecia Wasson; United States	Savannah Marshall; England	Yang Tingting; China
2010 Bridgetown	Andrecia Wasson; United States	Savannah Marshall; England	Marichelle Jong; Netherlands
2012 Qinhuangdao	Mariia Badulina; Ukraine	Raquel Miller; United States	Marie de Jong; Netherlands
2012 Qinhuangdao	Mariia Badulina; Ukraine	Raquel Miller; United States	Irina Poteyeva; Russia
2014 Jeju City	Atheyna Bylon; Panama	Saadat Abdulaeva; Russia	Elena Vystropova; Azerbaijan
2014 Jeju City	Atheyna Bylon; Panama	Saadat Abdulaeva; Russia	Erika Guerrier; France
2016 Astana	Valentina Khalzova; Kazakhstan	Gu Hong; China	Elina Gustafsson; Finland
2016 Astana	Valentina Khalzova; Kazakhstan	Gu Hong; China	Nadine Apetz; Germany
2018 New Delhi	Chen Nien-chin; Chinese Taipei	Gu Hong; China	Lovlina Borgohain; India
2018 New Delhi	Chen Nien-chin; Chinese Taipei	Gu Hong; China	Nadine Apetz; Germany
2019 Ulan-Ude	Busenaz Sürmeneli; Turkey	Yang Liu; China	Lovlina Borgohain; India
2019 Ulan-Ude	Busenaz Sürmeneli; Turkey	Yang Liu; China	Saadat Dalgatova; Russia
2022 Istanbul	Busenaz Sürmeneli; Turkey	Charlie Cavanagh; Canada	Ichrak Chaib; Algeria
2022 Istanbul	Busenaz Sürmeneli; Turkey	Charlie Cavanagh; Canada	Janjaem Suwannapheng; Thailand
2023 New Delhi (Note: Original finalist Imane Khelif of Algeria was disqualified after failing to meet gender eligibility rules.)	Yang Liu; China	Janjaem Suwannapheng; Thailand	Navbakhor Khamidova; Uzbekistan
2023 New Delhi	Yang Liu; China	Janjaem Suwannapheng; Thailand	Nadezhda Ryabets; Kazakhstan
2025 Niš	Busenaz Sürmeneli; Turkey	Navbakhor Khamidova; Uzbekistan	Anastasija Lukajić; Serbia
2025 Niš	Busenaz Sürmeneli; Turkey	Navbakhor Khamidova; Uzbekistan	Albina Moldazhanova; Russia

== Light middleweight ==
- −71 kg: 2001–2002
- −70 kg: 2005–2008, 2022–

Games	Gold	Silver	Bronze
2001 Scranton	Ivett Pruzsinszky; Hungary	Vacant (Note: Natalya Kolpakova of Russia was disqualified for protest against judges' decision and stripped of her silver medal, which was not transferred to another athlete.)	Nurcan Çarkçı; Turkey
2001 Scranton	Ivett Pruzsinszky; Hungary	Vacant	Irina Smirnova; Moldova
2002 Antalya	Larisa Berezenko; Ukraine	Yvonne Reis; United States	Paola Casalinuovo; Argentina
2002 Antalya	Larisa Berezenko; Ukraine	Yvonne Reis; United States	Roxanne Lalancette; Canada
2005 Podolsk	Olga Slavinskaya; Russia	Ariane Fortin; Canada	Chenthittail Aswathimol; India
2005 Podolsk	Olga Slavinskaya; Russia	Ariane Fortin; Canada	Nurcan Çarkçı; Turkey
2006 New Delhi	Ariane Fortin; Canada	Akima Stocks; United States	Luminita Turcin; Romania
2006 New Delhi	Ariane Fortin; Canada	Akima Stocks; United States	Olga Slavinskaya; Russia
2008 Ningbo City	Ariane Fortin; Canada	Yang Tingting; China	Yelena Koltsova; Kazakhstan
2008 Ningbo City	Ariane Fortin; Canada	Yang Tingting; China	Nurcan Çarkçı; Turkey
2022 Istanbul	Lisa O'Rourke; Ireland	Alcinda Panguana; Mozambique	Sema Çalışkan; Turkey
2022 Istanbul	Lisa O'Rourke; Ireland	Alcinda Panguana; Mozambique	Valentina Khalzova; Kazakhstan
2023 New Delhi	Anastasiia Demurchian; Russia	Kaye Scott; Australia	Zhou Pan; China
2023 New Delhi	Anastasiia Demurchian; Russia	Kaye Scott; Australia	Bárbara Santos; Brazil
2025 Niš	Elena Gapeshina; Russia	Lisa O'Rourke; Ireland	Aryna Danilchyk; Belarus
2025 Niš	Elena Gapeshina; Russia	Lisa O'Rourke; Ireland	Natalya Bogdanova; Kazakhstan

== Middleweight ==
- −75 kg: 2001–

Games	Gold	Silver	Bronze
2001 Scranton	Anna Laurell; Sweden	Anita Ducza; Hungary	Svetlana Andreyeva; Russia
2001 Scranton	Anna Laurell; Sweden	Anita Ducza; Hungary	Guo Shuai; China
2002 Antalya	Olga Slavinskaya; Belarus	Betina Karlsen; Denmark	Guo Shuai; China
2002 Antalya	Olga Slavinskaya; Belarus	Betina Karlsen; Denmark	Karamjit Kaur; India
2005 Podolsk	Anna Laurell; Sweden	Olga Novikova; Ukraine	Anita Ducza; Hungary
2005 Podolsk	Anna Laurell; Sweden	Olga Novikova; Ukraine	Mariya Yavorskaya; Russia
2006 New Delhi	Lekha K. C. India	Li Jinzi; China	Anita Ducza; Hungary
2006 New Delhi	Lekha K. C. India	Li Jinzi; China	Olga Novikova; Ukraine
2008 Ningbo City	Li Jinzi; China	Anna Laurell; Sweden	Anita Ducza; Hungary
2008 Ningbo City	Li Jinzi; China	Anna Laurell; Sweden	Amber Konikow; Canada
2010 Bridgetown	Mary Spencer; Canada	Li Jinzi; China	Liliya Durnyeva; Ukraine
2010 Bridgetown	Mary Spencer; Canada	Li Jinzi; China	Mária Kovács; Hungary
2012 Qinhuangdao	Savannah Marshall; England	Elena Vystropova; Azerbaijan	Nadezhda Torlopova; Russia
2012 Qinhuangdao	Savannah Marshall; England	Elena Vystropova; Azerbaijan	Anna Laurell; Sweden
2014 Jeju City	Claressa Shields; United States	Li Qian; China	Nouchka Fontijn; Netherlands
2014 Jeju City	Claressa Shields; United States	Li Qian; China	Ariane Fortin; Canada
2016 Astana	Claressa Shields; United States	Nouchka Fontijn; Netherlands	Chen Nien-chin; Chinese Taipei
2016 Astana	Claressa Shields; United States	Nouchka Fontijn; Netherlands	Savannah Marshall; Great Britain
2018 New Delhi	Li Qian; China	Nouchka Fontijn; Netherlands	Naomi Graham; United States
2018 New Delhi	Li Qian; China	Nouchka Fontijn; Netherlands	Lauren Price; Wales
2019 Ulan-Ude	Lauren Price; Wales	Nouchka Fontijn; Netherlands	Tammara Thibeault; Canada
2019 Ulan-Ude	Lauren Price; Wales	Nouchka Fontijn; Netherlands	Khadija El-Mardi; Morocco
2022 Istanbul	Tammara Thibeault; Canada	Atheyna Bylon; Panama	Rady Gramane; Mozambique
2022 Istanbul	Tammara Thibeault; Canada	Atheyna Bylon; Panama	Davina Michel; France
2023 New Delhi	Lovlina Borgohain; India	Caitlin Parker; Australia	Li Qian; China
2023 New Delhi	Lovlina Borgohain; India	Caitlin Parker; Australia	Valentina Khalzova; Kazakhstan
2025 Niš	Anastasiia Shamonova; Russia	Aoife O'Rourke; Ireland	Nikolina Gajić; Serbia
2025 Niš	Anastasiia Shamonova; Russia	Aoife O'Rourke; Ireland	Wang Lina; China

== Light heavyweight ==
- −81 kg: 2001–2002
- −80 kg: 2005–2008
- −81 kg: 2010–

Games	Gold	Silver	Bronze
2001 Scranton	Olga Domouladzhanova; Russia	Viktoria Kovacs; Hungary	Tanya Fowler; Canada
2001 Scranton	Olga Domouladzhanova; Russia	Viktoria Kovacs; Hungary	Faye Jacobs-Hollins; United States
2002 Antalya	Anzhela Torskaya; Ukraine	Irina Smirnova; Belarus	Jennyfer Grenon; Canada
2002 Antalya	Anzhela Torskaya; Ukraine	Irina Smirnova; Belarus	Olga Novoselova; Russia
2005 Podolsk	Galina Ivanova; Russia	Selma Yağcı; Turkey	Tyler Lord-Wilder; United States
2005 Podolsk	Galina Ivanova; Russia	Selma Yağcı; Turkey	Beata Malek; Poland
2006 New Delhi	Irina Sinetskaya; Russia	Chitiqua Hemingway; United States	Renu Gora; India
2006 New Delhi	Irina Sinetskaya; Russia	Chitiqua Hemingway; United States	Beata Malek; Poland
2008 Ningbo City	Tang Jieli; China	Mioshia Wagoner; United States	Fetti Paraschiva; Romania
2008 Ningbo City	Tang Jieli; China	Mioshia Wagoner; United States	Selma Yağcı; Turkey
2010 Bridgetown	Roseli Feitosa; Brazil	Marina Volnova; Kazakhstan	Tímea Nagy; Hungary
2010 Bridgetown	Roseli Feitosa; Brazil	Marina Volnova; Kazakhstan	Wang Yanrui; China
2012 Qinhuangdao	Yuan Meiqing; China	Franchon Crews; United States	Svetlana Kosova; Russia
2012 Qinhuangdao	Yuan Meiqing; China	Franchon Crews; United States	Tímea Nagy; Hungary
2014 Jeju City	Yang Xiaoli; China	Saweety Boora; India	Anastasia Chernokolenko; Ukraine
2014 Jeju City	Yang Xiaoli; China	Saweety Boora; India	Elif Güneri; Turkey
2016 Astana	Yang Xiaoli; China	Kaye Scott; Australia	Franchon Crews; United States
2016 Astana	Yang Xiaoli; China	Kaye Scott; Australia	Elif Güneri; Turkey
2018 New Delhi	Wang Lina; China	Jessica Caicedo; Colombia	Elif Güneri; Turkey
2018 New Delhi	Wang Lina; China	Jessica Caicedo; Colombia	Viktoria Kebikava; Belarus
2019 Ulan-Ude	Zenfira Magomedalieva; Russia	Elif Güneri; Turkey	Wang Lina; China
2019 Ulan-Ude	Zenfira Magomedalieva; Russia	Elif Güneri; Turkey	Nguyễn Thị Hương; Vietnam
2022 Istanbul	Gabrielė Stonkutė; Lithuania	Oliwia Toborek; Poland	Jessica Bagley; Australia
2022 Istanbul	Gabrielė Stonkutė; Lithuania	Oliwia Toborek; Poland	Elif Güneri; Turkey
2023 New Delhi	Saweety Boora; India	Wang Lina; China	Emma-Sue Greentree; Australia
2023 New Delhi	Saweety Boora; India	Wang Lina; China	Fariza Sholtay; Kazakhstan
2025 Niš	Saltanat Medenova; Russia	Büşra Işıldar; Turkey	Wang Xiaomeng; China
2025 Niš	Saltanat Medenova; Russia	Büşra Işıldar; Turkey	Hasna Larti; Morocco

== Heavyweight ==
- −90 kg: 2001
- +81 kg: 2002
- −86 kg: 2005–2008
- +81 kg: 2010–

Games	Gold	Silver	Bronze
2001 Scranton	Devonne Canady; United States	Mária Kovács; Hungary	Mariya Reyngard; Russia
2001 Scranton	Devonne Canady; United States	Mária Kovács; Hungary	Selma Yağcı; Turkey
2002 Antalya	Mária Kovács; Hungary	Mariya Yovorskaya; Russia	Devonne Canady; United States
2002 Antalya	Mária Kovács; Hungary	Mariya Yovorskaya; Russia	Jyotsana Haryana; India
2005 Podolsk	Mária Kovács; Hungary	Şemsi Yaralı; Turkey	Jyotsana Kumari; India
2005 Podolsk	Mária Kovács; Hungary	Şemsi Yaralı; Turkey	Mariya Reyngard; Russia
2006 New Delhi	Elena Surkova; Russia	Mária Kovács; Hungary	Adriana Hosu; Romania
2006 New Delhi	Elena Surkova; Russia	Mária Kovács; Hungary	Şemsi Yaralı; Turkey
2008 Ningbo City	Şemsi Yaralı; Turkey	Adriana Hosu; Romania	Zhang Lina; China
2008 Ningbo City	Şemsi Yaralı; Turkey	Adriana Hosu; Romania	Tiffanie Hearn; United States
2010 Bridgetown	Nadezhda Torlopova; Russia	Kateryna Kuzhel; Ukraine	Li Yunfei; China
2010 Bridgetown	Nadezhda Torlopova; Russia	Kateryna Kuzhel; Ukraine	Kavita Chahal; India
2012 Qinhuangdao	Li Yunfei; China	Yulduz Mamatkulova; Kazakhstan	Irina Sinetskaya; Russia
2012 Qinhuangdao	Li Yunfei; China	Yulduz Mamatkulova; Kazakhstan	Kavita Chahal; India
2014 Jeju City	Zenfira Magomedalieva; Russia	Lazzat Kungeibayeva; Kazakhstan	Wang Shijin; China
2014 Jeju City	Zenfira Magomedalieva; Russia	Lazzat Kungeibayeva; Kazakhstan	Emine Bozduman; Turkey
2016 Astana	Lazzat Kungeibayeva; Kazakhstan	Shadasia Green; United States	Şennur Demir; Turkey
2016 Astana	Lazzat Kungeibayeva; Kazakhstan	Shadasia Green; United States	Wang Shijin; China
2018 New Delhi	Yang Xiaoli; China	Şennur Demir; Turkey	Danielle Perkins; United States
2018 New Delhi	Yang Xiaoli; China	Şennur Demir; Turkey	Kristina Tkacheva; Russia
2019 Ulan-Ude	Danielle Perkins; United States	Yang Xiaoli; China	Dina Islambekova; Kazakhstan
2019 Ulan-Ude	Danielle Perkins; United States	Yang Xiaoli; China	Katsiaryna Kavaleva; Belarus
2022 Istanbul	Şennur Demir; Turkey	Khadija El-Mardi; Morocco	Lidia Fidura; Poland
2022 Istanbul	Şennur Demir; Turkey	Khadija El-Mardi; Morocco	Mokhira Abdullaeva; Uzbekistan
2023 New Delhi	Khadija El-Mardi; Morocco	Lazzat Kungeibayeva; Kazakhstan	Diana Pyatak; Russia
2023 New Delhi	Khadija El-Mardi; Morocco	Lazzat Kungeibayeva; Kazakhstan	Aynur Rzayeva; Azerbaijan
2025 Niš	Zhan Yilian; China	Yeldana Talipova; Kazakhstan	Elif Güneri; Turkey
2025 Niš	Zhan Yilian; China	Yeldana Talipova; Kazakhstan	Daria Sazonova; Moldova

== Multiple gold medalists ==
Boldface denotes active amateur boxers and highest medal count among all boxers (including these who not included in these tables) per type.

Rank	Boxer	Country	Weights	From	To	Gold	Silver	Bronze	Total
1	Mary Kom	India	48 kg / 45 kg / 46 kg / 51 kg	2001	2019	**6**	1	1	**8**
2	Katie Taylor	Ireland	60 kg	2006	2016	5	–	1	6
3	Irina Sinetskaya	Russia	67 kg / 66 kg / 80 kg / +81 kg	2001	2012	3	1	1	5
4	Yang Xiaoli	China	81 kg / +81 kg	2014	2019	3	1	–	4
5	**Nazym Kyzaibay**	Kazakhstan	48 kg	2012	2025	3	–	1	4
5	Mary Spencer	Canada	66 kg / 75 kg	2005	2010	3	–	1	4
7	Simona Galassi	Italy	51 kg / 50 kg	2001	2005	3	–	–	3
7	Ren Cancan	China	52 kg / 51 kg	2008	2012	3	–	–	3
7	**Busenaz Sürmeneli**	Turkey	69 kg / 66 kg	2019	2025	3	–	–	3
10	Mária Kovács	Hungary	90 kg / 86 kg / 75 kg	2001	2010	2	2	1	5
11	Ariane Fortin	Canada	70 kg / 75 kg	2005	2014	2	1	1	4
11	Anna Laurell	Sweden	75 kg	2001	2012	2	1	1	4
11	Sofya Ochigava	Russia	52 kg / 54 kg / 57 kg / 60 kg	2005	2012	2	1	1	4
14	**Beatriz Ferreira**	Brazil	60 kg	2019	2023	2	1	–	3
14	Ri Yong-hiang	North Korea	48 kg	2002	2006	2	1	–	3
14	Gülsüm Tatar	Turkey	60 kg / 63 kg / 64 kg	2005	2010	2	1	–	3
14	Yun Kum-ju	North Korea	57 kg	2005	2010	2	1	–	3
18	**Lin Yu-ting**	Chinese Taipei	54 kg / 57 kg	2018	2022	2	–	1	3
18	**Pang Chol-mi**	North Korea	51 kg / 52 kg	2018	2025	2	–	1	3
18	Olga Slavinskaya	Belarus; Russia	75 kg / 70 kg	2002	2006	2	–	1	3
21	Dou Dan	China	64 kg	2018	2019	2	–	–	2
21	**Huang Hsiao-wen**	Chinese Taipei	54 kg	2019	2023	2	–	–	2
21	Yelena Karpecheva	Russia	54 kg / 57 kg	2001	2005	2	–	–	2
21	**Zenfira Magomedalieva**	Russia	+81 kg / 81 kg	2014	2019	2	–	–	2
21	Claressa Shields	United States	75 kg	2014	2016	2	–	–	2
21	**Nikhat Zareen**	India	52 kg / 50 kg	2022	2023	2	–	–	2
