= 2012 AIBA Women's World Boxing Championships =

Boxing competitions

- Location: Qinhuangdao, China
- Start date: May 9, 2012
- End date: May 22, 2012
- Competitors: 305 from 70 nations

The 2012 AIBA Women's World Boxing Championships was held in Qinhuangdao, China from May 9 to May 22, 2012.

For the first time, this world championship served as a qualifier for the 2012 Summer Olympics. 305 boxers participated from 70 countries.

== Olympic qualification summary ==
NOC	51	60	75	Total
Australia			X	1
Azerbaijan			X	1
Brazil		X	X	2
China	X		X	2
Great Britain	X	X	X	3
India	X			1
Ireland		X		1
Kazakhstan		X		1
New Zealand	X	X		2
Nigeria			X	1
Poland	X			1
Russia	X	X	X	3
Tajikistan		X		1
Tunisia	X	X		2
United States	X		X	2
Venezuela	X			1
Total: 16 NOCs	9	8	8	25

== Medal summary ==
=== Medal table ===
* Host nation (China)

Rank	Nation	Gold	Silver	Bronze	Total
1	China (CHN)*	3	1	1	5
2	United States (USA)	1	2	2	5
3	Russia (RUS)	1	1	7	9
4	England (ENG)	1	1	2	4
5	Ireland (IRL)	1	0	0	1
5	North Korea (PRK)	1	0	0	1
5	Philippines (PHI)	1	0	0	1
5	Ukraine (UKR)	1	0	0	1
9	Poland (POL)	0	2	1	3
10	Kazakhstan (KAZ)	0	1	1	2
11	Azerbaijan (AZE)	0	1	0	1
11	Italy (ITA)	0	1	0	1
13	Bulgaria (BUL)	0	0	1	1
13	Hungary (HUN)	0	0	1	1
13	India (IND)	0	0	1	1
13	Netherlands (NED)	0	0	1	1
13	Sweden (SWE)	0	0	1	1
13	Tajikistan (TJK)	0	0	1	1
Totals (18 entries)		10	10	20	40

=== Medalists ===
Event	Gold	Silver	Bronze
Light flyweight (48 kg)	Josie Gabuco; Philippines	Xu Shiqi; China	Svetlana Gnevanova; Russia
Light flyweight (48 kg)	Josie Gabuco; Philippines	Xu Shiqi; China	Nazym Kyzaibay; Kazakhstan
Flyweight (51 kg)	Ren Cancan; China	Nicola Adams; England	Karolina Michalczuk; Poland
Flyweight (51 kg)	Ren Cancan; China	Nicola Adams; England	Elena Savelyeva; Russia
Bantamweight (54 kg)	Aleksandra Kuleshova; Russia	Terry Gordini; Italy	Liu Kejia; China
Bantamweight (54 kg)	Aleksandra Kuleshova; Russia	Terry Gordini; Italy	Christina Cruz; United States
Featherweight (57 kg)	Tiara Brown; United States	Sandra Kruk; Poland	Svetlana Staneva; Bulgaria
Featherweight (57 kg)	Tiara Brown; United States	Sandra Kruk; Poland	Lisa Whiteside; England
Lightweight (60 kg)	Katie Taylor; Ireland	Sofya Ochigava; Russia	Mavzuna Chorieva; Tajikistan
Lightweight (60 kg)	Katie Taylor; Ireland	Sofya Ochigava; Russia	Natasha Jonas; England
Light welterweight (64 kg)	Pak Kyong-ok; North Korea	Magdalena Stelmach; Poland	Mikaela Mayer; United States
Light welterweight (64 kg)	Pak Kyong-ok; North Korea	Magdalena Stelmach; Poland	Daria Abramova; Russia
Welterweight (69 kg)	Mariia Badulina; Ukraine	Raquel Miller; United States	Marichelle de Jong; Netherlands
Welterweight (69 kg)	Mariia Badulina; Ukraine	Raquel Miller; United States	Irina Poteyeva; Russia
Middleweight (75 kg)	Savannah Marshall; England	Elena Vystropova; Azerbaijan	Nadezda Torlopova; Russia
Middleweight (75 kg)	Savannah Marshall; England	Elena Vystropova; Azerbaijan	Anna Laurell; Sweden
Light heavyweight (81 kg)	Yuan Meiqing; China	Franchon Crews; United States	Svetlana Kosova; Russia
Light heavyweight (81 kg)	Yuan Meiqing; China	Franchon Crews; United States	Tímea Nagy; Hungary
Heavyweight (+81 kg)	Li Yunfei; China	Yulduz Mamatkulova; Kazakhstan	Irina Sinetskaya; Russia
Heavyweight (+81 kg)	Li Yunfei; China	Yulduz Mamatkulova; Kazakhstan	Kavita Chahal; India

== Results ==
=== Light flyweight ===
26 boxers participating in this category.

Round of 32 – May 13
	Score	
Elin Rönnlund (SWE)	5–12	Xu Shiqi (CHN)
Chuthamat Raksat (THA)	13–8	Lin Yu-Ting (TPE)
Anita Böde (HUN)	4–17	Kim Myong-Sim (PRK)
Lydia Boussadia (FRA)	25–6	Vladimíra Malíková (CZE)
Lloyd Scully (NZL)	RSC	Nazym Kyzaibay (KAZ)
Josie Gabuco (PHI)	24–13	Yairineth Altuve (VEN)
Derya Aktop (TUR)	RSC	Shamila Husainzada (AFG)
Pinki Jangra (IND)	RSC	Mirela Barudžić (SRB)
Lidia Ion (ROU)	15–8	Matluba Karimova (TJK)
Madoka Wada (JPN)	31–19	Nataliya Knyaz (UKR)

Round of 16; May 15
Lynsey Holdaway (WAL)	9
Xu Shiqi (CHN)	20
Chuthamat Raksat (THA)	5
Kim Myong-Sim (PRK)	12
Nguyễn Thị Tuyết (VIE)	17
Lydia Boussadia (FRA)	19
Nazym Kyzaibay (KAZ)	20
Alexandra Love (USA)	19
Tömörkhuyagiin Bolortuul (MGL)	DSQ
Josie Gabuco (PHI)
Derya Aktop (TUR)	10
Kim Klavel (CAN)	17
Pinki Jangra (IND)	26
Lidia Ion (ROU)	16
Madoka Wada (JPN)	9
Svetlana Gnevanova (RUS)	19

Quarterfinal; May 16
Xu Shiqi (CHN)	8
Kim Myong-Sim (PRK)	6
Lydia Boussadia (FRA)	15
Nazym Kyzaibay (KAZ)	23
Josie Gabuco (PHI)	21
Kim Klavel (CAN)	15
Pinki Jangra (IND)	11
Svetlana Gnevanova (RUS)	13

Semifinal; May 18
Xu Shiqi (CHN)	17
Nazym Kyzaibay (KAZ)	10
Josie Gabuco (PHI)	12
Svetlana Gnevanova (RUS)	7

Final; May 19
Xu Shiqi (CHN)	9
Josie Gabuco (PHI)	10

=== Flyweight ===
55 boxers participating in this category that qualifies for the Olympics.

Finals

Semifinals; May 18
1	Ren Cancan (CHN)	27
4	Karolina Michalczuk (POL)	18
3	Elena Savelyeva (RUS)	6
2	Nicola Adams (ENG)	11

Final; May 19
Ren Cancan (CHN)	14
Nicola Adams (ENG)	10

Section 1

Round of 64; May 12
Oluwatoyin Oladeji (NGR)	7
Katalin Ancsin (HUN)	14
Myagmardulamyn Nandintsetseg (MGL)	13
Hanne Mäkinen (FIN)	16
Azize Nimani (GER)	23
Pamela Sánchez (CRC)	6
Shipra Engelke (SWE)	12
Lưu Thị Duyên (VIE)	18
Pamela Benavidez (ARG)	22
Zohra El Zahraoui (MAR)	14

Round of 32; May 13
Ren Cancan (CHN)	16
Katalin Ancsin (HUN)	4
Hanne Mäkinen (FIN)	11
Azize Nimani (GER)	14
Christine Ongare (KEN)	6
Lưu Thị Duyên (VIE)	21
Pamela Benavidez (ARG)	10
Marlen Esparza (USA)	20

Round of 16; May 15
Ren Cancan (CHN)	13
Azize Nimani (GER)	7
Lưu Thị Duyên (VIE)	13
Marlen Esparza (USA)	28

Quarterfinals; May 16
Ren Cancan (CHN)	16
Marlen Esparza (USA)	8

Section 2

Round of 64; May 12
Ingrit Valencia (COL)	8
Sarah Ourahmoune (FRA)	18
Valeria Calabrese (ITA)	11
Nesthy Petecio (PHI)	10
Stoyka Petrova (BUL)	10
Peamwilai Laopeam (THA)	8
Sarah-Joy Rae (JAM)	7
Mateja Rajterič (SLO)	6
Svetlana Veglina (TJK)
Ceire Smith (IRL)	RSC
Anusha Koddithuwakku (SRI)	8
Sümeyra Yazıcı (TUR)	18

Round of 32; May 13
Tetyana Kob (UKR)	11
Sarah Ourahmoune (FRA)	21
Valeria Calabrese (ITA)	10
Stoyka Petrova (BUL)	16
Sarah-Joy Rae (JAM)	4
Ceire Smith (IRL)	12
Sümeyra Yazıcı (TUR)	14
Karolina Michalczuk (POL)	16

Round of 16; May 15
Sarah Ourahmoune (FRA)	15
Stoyka Petrova (BUL)	21
Ceire Smith (IRL)	7
Karolina Michalczuk (POL)	23

Quarterfinals; May 16
Stoyka Petrova (BUL)	14
Karolina Michalczuk (POL)	27

Section 3

Round of 64; May 12
Nasiba Ruzimatova (UZB)	5
Pin Meng-chieh (TPE)	11
Anna du Plessis (RSA)	12
Jana Juranová (CZE)	26
Nina Stojanović (SRB)	13
Nadia Barriga Villarroel (BOL)	14
Zhaina Shekerbekova (KAZ)	10
Érica Matos (BRA)	12
Kim Ye-ji (KOR)	RSCI
Marta Brañas Rumbo (ESP)
Mandy Bujold (CAN)	9
Kim Hye-Song (PRK)	11

Round of 32; May 13
Elena Savelyeva (RUS)	19
Pin Meng-chieh (TPE)	8
Jana Juranová (CZE)	17
Nadia Barriga Villarroel (BOL)	10
Érica Matos (BRA)	10
Kim Ye-ji (KOR)	5
Kim Hye-Song (PRK)	17
Steluţa Duţă (ROU)	8

Round of 16; May 15
Elena Savelyeva (RUS)	35
Jana Juranová (CZE)	2
Érica Matos (BRA)	8
Kim Hye-Song (PRK)	12

Quarterfinals; May 16
Elena Savelyeva (RUS)	11
Kim Hye-Song (PRK)	5

Section 4

Round of 64; May 12
Ayako Minowa (JPN)	24
Athina Malefaki (GRE)	9
Sumaiya Azizi (AFG)
Zaida Enríquez (MEX)	RSC
Tiffany Pérez (PUR)	14
Marielle Hansen (NOR)	21
Warni Halawa (INA)	9
Maroua Rahali (TUN)	24
Karlha Magliocco (VEN)	20
Siona Fernandes (NZL)	18
Yana Levankova (BLR)	17
Kristy Harris (AUS)	10

Round of 32; May 13
Mary Kom (IND)	20
Ayako Minowa (JPN)	9
Zaida Enríquez (MEX)	7
Marielle Hansen (NOR)	21
Maroua Rahali (TUN)	11
Karlha Magliocco (VEN)	22
Yana Levankova (BLR)	7
Nicola Adams (ENG)	19

Round of 16; May 15
Mary Kom (IND)	18
Marielle Hansen (NOR)	6
Karlha Magliocco (VEN)	7
Nicola Adams (ENG)	20

Quarterfinals; May 16
Mary Kom (IND)	11
Nicola Adams (ENG)	13

=== Bantamweight ===
32 boxers participating in this category.

Round of 32 – May 13
	Score	
Ayşe Taş (TUR)	16–20	Delphine Mancini (FRA)
Sopida Satumrum (THA)	RSC	Ivanna Krupenia (UKR)
Shakhnoza Khujaniyozova (UZB)	RSC	Shora Rezaie Jahroni (NOR)
Nicole Michel (SUI)	8–22	Christina Cruz (USA)
Csilla Némedi-Varga (HUN)	14–13	Juliana Söderström (SWE)
Jenna Puurunen (FIN)	10–14	Terry Gordini (ITA)
Lital Zastlin (ISR)	11–18	Nilmini Jayasinghe (SRI)
Alice Aparri (PHI)	15–11	Clélia Costa (BRA)
Liu Kejia (CHN)	15–6	Gulzhan Akimova (KAZ)
Debora Rengifo (VEN)	15–23	Vicky Pelletier (CAN)
Cherneka Johnson (AUS)	22–12	Ruth Odongo (KEN)
Sadaf Rahemi (AFG)	RSC	Sandra Drabik (POL)
Sonia Lather (IND)	9–18	Elena Walendzik (GER)
Chinase Fujino (JPN)	RSC	Aleksandra Kuleshova (RUS)
Denisa Amza (ROU)	11–21	Helina Bruyevich (BLR)
Felice Groves (JAM)	7–25	Lưu Thị Hành (VIE)

Round of 16; May 15
Delphine Mancini (FRA)	6
Sopida Satumrum (THA)	17
Shora Rezaie Jahroni (NOR)	10
Christina Cruz (USA)	14
Csilla Némedi-Varga (HUN)	DSQ
Terry Gordini (ITA)
Nilmini Jayasinghe (SRI)	8
Alice Aparri (PHI)	16
Liu Kejia (CHN)	19
Vicky Pelletier (CAN)	10
Cherneka Johnson (AUS)	9
Sandra Drabik (POL)	22
Elena Walendzik (GER)	9
Aleksandra Kuleshova (RUS)	18
Helina Bruyevich (BLR)	15
Lưu Thị Hành (VIE)	18

Quarterfinal; May 16
Sopida Satumrum (THA)	19
Christina Cruz (USA)	20
Terry Gordini (ITA)	+10
Alice Aparri (PHI)	10
Liu Kejia (CHN)	17
Sandra Drabik (POL)	10
Aleksandra Kuleshova (RUS)	26
Lưu Thị Hành (VIE)	8

Semifinal; May 18
Christina Cruz (USA)	7
Terry Gordini (ITA)	11
Liu Kejia (CHN)	10
Aleksandra Kuleshova (RUS)	19

Final; May 19
Terry Gordini (ITA)	10
Aleksandra Kuleshova (RUS)	16

=== Featherweight ===
28 boxers participating in this category.

Round of 32 – May 11
	Score	
Bojana Ranić (SRB)	RSC	Mandakini Kangabam (IND)
Skye Nicolson (AUS)	5–16	Chen Chia-Ling (TPE)
Gabriela Dinca (ROU)	RSC	Qin Jian (CHN)
Nagehan Malkoç (TUR)	7–16	Svetlana Staneva (BUL)
Saniya Sultankyzy (KAZ)	20–10	Khouloud Hlimi (TUN)
Kornelia Nagy (HUN)	6–17	Cynthia Robles de la Torre (MEX)
Rebah Matanda (KEN)	10–22	Nana Yoshikawa (JPN)
Marie O'Neill (NZL)	7–18	Iuliia Tsyplakova (UKR)
Melissa Guillemette (CAN)	15–7	Sarah Mahfoud (DEN)
Vương Thị Vỹ (VIE)	28–4	Anamarija Vujaklija (CRO)
Maike Kluners (GER)	18–29	Maiva Hamadouche (FRA)
Viktoria Gurkovich (RUS)	RSC	Piroska Bodoki (SVK)

Round of 16; May 14
Tiara Brown (USA)	21
Mandakini Kangabam (IND)	16
Chen Chia-Ling (TPE)	6
Qin Jian (CHN)	11
Svetlana Staneva (BUL)	10
Saniya Sultankyzy (KAZ)	6
Cynthia Robles de la Torre (MEX)	12
Kim Kil-ok (PRK)	21
Lisa Whiteside (ENG)	19
Nana Yoshikawa (JPN)	6
Iuliia Tsyplakova (UKR)	19
Melissa Guillemette (CAN)	16
Vương Thị Vỹ (VIE)	12
Maiva Hamadouche (FRA)	32
Viktoria Gurkovich (RUS)	19
Sandra Kruk (POL)	24

Quarterfinal; May 16
Tiara Brown (USA)	23
Qin Jian (CHN)	22
Svetlana Staneva (BUL)	25
Kim Kil-ok (PRK)	15
Lisa Whiteside (ENG)	25
Iuliia Tsyplakova (UKR)	19
Maiva Hamadouche (FRA)	22
Sandra Kruk (POL)	33

Semifinal; May 18
Tiara Brown (USA)	22
Svetlana Staneva (BUL)	14
Lisa Whiteside (ENG)	16
Sandra Kruk (POL)	26

Final; May 19
Tiara Brown (USA)	24
Sandra Kruk (POL)	21

Note - quarter-finalist Kim Kil-ok (PRK) was disqualified from the championships in 2022 after a retest of her doping sample revealed the presence of Clenbuterol.

=== Lightweight ===
58 boxers participating in this category that qualifies for the Olympics.

Finals

Semifinals; May 18
1	Katie Taylor (IRL)	16
4	Mavzuna Chorieva (TJK)	6
3	Sofya Ochigava (RUS)	18
2	Natasha Jonas (ENG)	10

Final; May 19
Katie Taylor (IRL)	11
Sofya Ochigava (RUS)	7

Section 1

Round of 64; May 12
Rim Jouini (TUN)	16
Juliana Canedo da Rocha (POR)	8
Jhennifer Cáceres (COL)	12
Saida Khassenova (KAZ)	24
Jennifer Miranda (ESP)	13
Armine Sinabyan (ARM)	9
Matea Tabak (CRO)	11
Hsueh Chun-Chiu (TPE)	17
Mihaela Lăcătuş (ROU)	18
Oyuungereliin Suvd-Erdene (MGL)	12
Beáta Szabó (HUN)	16
Saraswati Rana (NEP)	7
Magdalena Konbayong (INA)	5
Denitsa Eliseeva (BUL)	22

Round of 32; May 14
Katie Taylor (IRL)	19
Rim Jouini (TUN)	6
Saida Khassenova (KAZ)	19
Jennifer Miranda (ESP)	12
Hsueh Chun-Chiu (TPE)	9
Mihaela Lăcătuş (ROU)	16
Beáta Szabó (HUN)	2
Denitsa Eliseeva (BUL)	18

Round of 16; May 15
Katie Taylor (IRL)	RSC
Saida Khassenova (KAZ)
Mihaela Lăcătuş (ROU)	17
Denitsa Eliseeva (BUL)	14

Quarterfinals; May 16
Katie Taylor (IRL)	WO
Mihaela Lăcătuş (ROU)

Section 2

Round of 64; May 12
Mavzuna Chorieva (TJK)	RSC
Ala Yarshevich (BLR)
Antonina Shevchenko (KGZ)	16
Mahjoub Oubtil (MAR)	15
Tomoko Kugimiya (JPN)	16
Kehinde Obareh (NGR)	14
Eleni Platana (GRE)	7
Julia Irmen (GER)	14
Ngô Thị Chung (VIE)	10
Estelle Mossely (FRA)	17
Nicole Trimmel (AUT)	12
Romina Marenda (ITA)	26

Round of 32; May 14
Karolina Graczyk (POL)	10
Mavzuna Chorieva (TJK)	20
Antonina Shevchenko (KGZ)	16
Tomoko Kugimiya (JPN)	12
Julia Irmen (GER)	11
Estelle Mossely (FRA)	12
Romina Marenda (ITA)	10
Tassamalee Thongjan (THA)	13

Round of 16; May 15
Mavzuna Chorieva (TJK)	RSC
Antonina Shevchenko (KGZ)
Estelle Mossely (FRA)	13
Tassamalee Thongjan (THA)	11

Quarterfinals; May 16
Mavzuna Chorieva (TJK)	20
Estelle Mossely (FRA)	12

Section 3

Round of 64; May 12
Sandra Bizier (CAN)	10
Erika Cruz (MEX)	15
Helena Falk (SWE)	22
Maria Ulpino (VEN)	7
Sofya Ochigava (RUS)	19
Kiria Tapia (PUR)	7
Oh Yeon-Ji (KOR)	27
Thobile Khumalo (RSA)	6
Ryu Yong-Sim (PRK)	20
Jessica Belder (NED)	8
Mira Potkonen (FIN)	26
Diana Nadim (DEN)	13

Round of 32; May 14
Dong Cheng (CHN)	18
Erika Cruz (MEX)	7
Helena Falk (SWE)	8
Sofya Ochigava (RUS)	17
Oh Yeon-Ji (KOR)	8
Ryu Yong-Sim (PRK)	13
Mira Potkonen (FIN)	16
Adriana dos Santos (BRA)	25

Round of 16; May 15
Dong Cheng (CHN)	7
Sofya Ochigava (RUS)	8
Ryu Yong-Sim (PRK)	14
Adriana dos Santos (BRA)	17

Quarterfinals; May 16
Sofya Ochigava (RUS)	15
Adriana dos Santos (BRA)	6

Section 4

Round of 64; May 12
Quanitta Underwood (USA)	24
Dayana Sánchez (ARG)	13
Dilnovaz Narkhodjaeva (UZB)
Alexis Pritchard (NZL)	WO
Karen Pérez Revolorio (GUA)	5
Ingrid Egner (NOR)	16
Jessica Retallack (AUS)	14
Oleksandra Sydorenko (UKR)	16
Mary Nganga (KEN)	6
Sandra Brügger (SUI)	23
Natasha Jonas (ENG)	18
Rebecca Price (WAL)	8
Ayzanat Hajiyeva (AZE)	11
Sarita Devi (IND)	27

Round of 32; May 14
Quanitta Underwood (USA)	28
Alexis Pritchard (NZL)	9
Ingrid Egner (NOR)	23
Oleksandra Sydorenko (UKR)	15
Sandra Brügger (SUI)	11
Natasha Jonas (ENG)	23
Sarita Devi (IND)	14
Gülsüm Tatar (TUR)	13

Round of 16; May 15
Quanitta Underwood (USA)	25
Ingrid Egner (NOR)	26
Natasha Jonas (ENG)	25
Sarita Devi (IND)	22

Quarterfinals; May 16
Ingrid Egner (NOR)	9
Natasha Jonas (ENG)	23

=== Light welterweight ===
26 boxers participating in this category.

Round of 32 – May 13
	Score	
Romana Lasan (CRO)	RSC	Gamze Başar (TUR)
Magdalena Stelmach (POL)	RSC	Nurys Silvera (VEN)
Yana Sydor (UKR)	24–12	Kanokwan Taluengjit (THA)
Daria Abramova (RUS)	28–9	Laëtitia Chevalier (FRA)
Iulia Navacioiu (ROU)	10–25	Patricia Berghult (SWE)
Martina Schmoranzová (CZE)	4–27	Pak Kyong-ok (PRK)
Sara Kali (CAN)	9–24	Shelley Watts (AUS)
Janina Bonorden (GER)	15–20	Marija Stojanović (SRB)
Meena Rani (IND)	RET	Nikolett Czosz (HUN)
Judit Barbosa Sotelo (ESP)	16–38	Laura Matthews (NZL)

Round of 16; May 15
Erdenesoyolyn Uyanga (MGL)	31
Gamze Başar (TUR)	22
Magdalena Stelmach (POL)	12
Yana Sydor (UKR)	11
Cui Qiao (CHN)	11
Daria Abramova (RUS)	19
Patricia Berghult (SWE)	24
Firuza Sharipova (KAZ)	11
Rosilaine Volante Silva (BRA)	18
Pak Kyong-ok (PRK)	29
Shelley Watts (AUS)	22
Lê Thị Hiển (VIE)	10
Marija Stojanović (SRB)	9
Meena Rani (IND)	21
Laura Matthews (NZL)	13
Mikaela Mayer (USA)	34

Quarterfinal; May 16
Erdenesoyolyn Uyanga (MGL)	10
Magdalena Stelmach (POL)	17
Daria Abramova (RUS)	17
Patricia Berghult (SWE)	15
Pak Kyong-ok (PRK)	26
Shelley Watts (AUS)	13
Meena Rani (IND)	10
Mikaela Mayer (USA)	27

Semifinal; May 18
Magdalena Stelmach (POL)	14
Daria Abramova (RUS)	10
Pak Kyong-ok (PRK)	25
Mikaela Mayer (USA)	24

Final; May 19
Magdalena Stelmach (POL)	5
Pak Kyong-ok (PRK)	10

=== Welterweight ===
20 boxers participating in this category.

Round of 32 – May 11
	Score	
Neetu Chahal (IND)	22–6	Bianka Nagy (HUN)
Moldir Bazarbayeva (KAZ)	20–10	Florina Radu (ROU)
Raquel Miller (USA)	17–8	Daena Stephenson (NZL)
Irina Poteyeva (RUS)	RET	Marija Divjak (SRB)

Round of 16; May 13
Marichelle de Jong (NED)	14
Neetu Chahal (IND)	8
Kaye Scott (AUS)	25
Carolina Quevedo (VEN)	13
Malika Gonthier-Silva (FRA)	22
Durry Wanjiru (KEN)	7
Moldir Bazarbayeva (KAZ)	7
Mariia Badulina (UKR)	19
Myriam da Silva (CAN)	18
Raquel Miller (USA)	+18
Jennifer Corti (SUI)	7
Bilgehan Karabulut (TUR)	23
Shiromoline Weeraretue (SRI)	5
Wang Dongmei (CHN)	22
Irina Poteyeva (RUS)	13
Lauren Price (WAL)	10

Quarterfinal; May 16
Marichelle de Jong (NED)	21
Kaye Scott (AUS)	9
Malika Gonthier-Silva (FRA)	6
Mariia Badulina (UKR)	15
Raquel Miller (USA)	11
Bilgehan Karabulut (TUR)	5
Wang Dongmei (CHN)	9
Irina Poteyeva (RUS)	11

Semifinal; May 18
Marichelle de Jong (NED)	10
Mariia Badulina (UKR)	18
Raquel Miller (USA)	13
Irina Poteyeva (RUS)	10

Final; May 19
Mariia Badulina (UKR)	14
Raquel Miller (USA)	8

=== Middleweight ===
40 boxers participating in this category that qualifies for the Olympics.

Finals

Semifinals; May 18
1	Anna Laurell (SWE)	15
4	Elena Vystropova (AZE)	16
3	Savannah Marshall (ENG)	18
2	Nadezda Torlopova (RUS)	10

Final; May 19
Elena Vystropova (AZE)	15
Savannah Marshall (ENG)	17

Section 1

Round of 64; May 12
Desislava Lazarova (BUL)	9
Anna Laurell (SWE)	10
Andrea Strohmaier (GER)	17
Soukayna Rabih (MAR)	13

Round of 32; May 14
Mary Spencer (CAN)	11
Anna Laurell (SWE)	18
Yenebier Guillén (DOM)	11
Lidia Fidura (POL)	13
Shahnoza Nizamova (UZB)
Shizuyo Yamasaki (JPN)	RSC
Andrea Strohmaier (GER)	+13
Maria Kovács (HUN)	13

Round of 16; May 15
Anna Laurell (SWE)	20
Lidia Fidura (POL)	14
Shizuyo Yamasaki (JPN)
Andrea Strohmaier (GER)	RSC

Quarterfinals; May 16
Anna Laurell (SWE)	24
Andrea Strohmaier (GER)	8

Section 2

Round of 64; May 12
Sinead Kavanagh (IRL)	19
Francelis Carmona (VEN)	23
Elena Vystropova (AZE)	18
Viktoria Kebikava (BLR)	7

Round of 32; May 14
Liliya Durnyeva (UKR)	20
Francelis Carmona (VEN)	5
Dara Flora Shen (TPE)	RSC
Claudia Heijns (RSA)
Ashkhen Simonyan (ARM)	6
Elena Turcin (ROU)	24
Elena Vystropova (AZE)	17
Roseli Feitosa (BRA)	12

Round of 16; May 15
Liliya Durnyeva (UKR)	7
Dara Flora Shen (TPE)	2
Elena Turcin (ROU)	2
Elena Vystropova (AZE)	10

Quarterfinals; May 16
Liliya Durnyeva (UKR)	5
Elena Vystropova (AZE)	12

Section 3

Round of 64; May 12
Erika Guerrier (FRA)	12
Nives Radić (CRO)	8
Pooja Rani (IND)	10
Claressa Shields (USA)	27

Round of 32; May 14
Li Jinzi (CHN)	19
Erika Guerrier (FRA)	8
Sudaporn Seesondee (THA)	20
Lê Thị Nhung (VIE)	6
Lotte Lien (NOR)	17
Elizabeth Andiego (KEN)	14
Claressa Shields (USA)	8
Savannah Marshall (ENG)	14

Round of 16; May 15
Li Jinzi (CHN)	14
Sudaporn Seesondee (THA)	4
Lotte Lien (NOR)	2
Savannah Marshall (ENG)	13

Quarterfinals; May 16
Li Jinzi (CHN)	8
Savannah Marshall (ENG)	20

Section 4

Round of 64; May 12
Hurricane Doyle (NZL)	RSC
Jang Un-hui (PRK)
Dina Gurung (NEP)
Edith Ogoke (NGR)	RSC

Round of 32; May 14
Nouchka Fontijn (NED)	22
Hurricane Doyle (NZL)	13
Marina Volnova (KAZ)	11
Elif Güneri (TUR)	10
Naomi-Lee Fischer-Rasmussen (AUS)	22
Kim Shin-hyeong (KOR)	9
Edith Ogoke (NGR)	10
Nadezda Torlopova (RUS)	25

Round of 16; May 15
Nouchka Fontijn (NED)	18
Marina Volnova (KAZ)	19
Naomi-Lee Fischer-Rasmussen (AUS)
Nadezda Torlopova (RUS)	RSC

Quarterfinals; May 16
Marina Volnova (KAZ)	11
Nadezda Torlopova (RUS)	19

=== Light heavyweight ===
12 boxers participating in this category.

Round of 16; May 14
Iryna Komar (UKR)	13
Şennur Demir (TUR)	16
Beata Leśnik (POL)	10
Andréia de Oliveira (BRA)	15
Franchon Crews (USA)	22
Sabrina Delarue (FRA)	8
Sarah Scheurich (GER)	10
Lalremliani Jenny (IND)	11

Quarterfinal; May 16
Yuan Meiqing (CHN)	18
Şennur Demir (TUR)	9
Andréia de Oliveira (BRA)	13
Svetlana Kosova (RUS)	20
Dariga Shakimova (KAZ)	12
Franchon Crews (USA)	30
Lalremliani Jenny (IND)	11
Tímea Nagy (HUN)	18

Semifinal; May 18
Yuan Meiqing (CHN)	23
Svetlana Kosova (RUS)	13
Franchon Crews (USA)	22
Tímea Nagy (HUN)	8

Final; May 19
Yuan Meiqing (CHN)	18
Franchon Crews (USA)	11

=== Heavyweight ===
8 boxers participating in this category.

Quarterfinal; May 16
Li Yunfei (CHN)	20
Danijela Vernić (CRO)	2
Irina Sinetskaya (RUS)
Petra Szatmári (HUN)	RET
Kateryna Shambir (UKR)	DSQ
Yulduz Mamatkulova (KAZ)
Kavita Chahal (IND)	15
Şemsi Yaralı (TUR)	14

Semifinal; May 18
Li Yunfei (CHN)	25
Irina Sinetskaya (RUS)	15
Yulduz Mamatkulova (KAZ)	15
Kavita Chahal (IND)	9

Final; May 19
Li Yunfei (CHN)	21
Yulduz Mamatkulova (KAZ)	13

== Participating countries ==
305 competitors from 70 countries will participate.

- Afghanistan (3)
- Argentina (2)
- Armenia (2)
- Australia (7)
- Austria (1)
- Azerbaijan (2)
- Belarus (4)
- Bolivia (1)
- Brazil (6)
- Bulgaria (4)
- Canada (8)
- China (10)
- Colombia (2)
- Costa Rica (1)
- Croatia (5)
- Czech Republic (3)
- Denmark (2)
- Dominican Republic (1)
- Finland (3)
- France (9)
- Germany (7)
- Great Britain
  - England (4)
  - Wales (3)
- Greece (2)
- Guatemala (1)
- Hungary (10)
- India (10)
- Indonesia (2)
- Ireland (3)
- Israel (1)
- Italy (3)
- Jamaica (2)
- Japan (6)
- Kazakhstan (10)
- Kenya (6)
- Kyrgyzstan (1)
- Mexico (3)
- Mongolia (4)
- Morocco (3)
- Nepal (2)
- Netherlands (3)
- New Zealand (7)
- Nigeria (3)
- North Korea (6)
- Norway (4)
- Philippines (3)
- Poland (7)
- Portugal (1)
- Puerto Rico (2)
- Romania (8)
- Russia (10)
- Serbia (5)
- Slovakia (1)
- Slovenia (1)
- South Africa (3)
- South Korea (3)
- Spain (3)
- Sri Lanka (3)
- Sweden (6)
- Switzerland (3)
- Tajikistan (3)
- Thailand (6)
- Chinese Taipei (5)
- Tunisia (3)
- Turkey (10)
- Ukraine (10)
- United States (9)
- Uzbekistan (4)
- Venezuela (7)
- Vietnam (7)
