= Boxing at the 2012 Summer Olympics – Women's flyweight =

Boxing competitions

Women's flyweight boxing at the Games of the XXX Olympiad
- Venue: ExCeL Exhibition Centre
- Date: 5 to 9 August 2012
- Competitors: 12 from 12 nations

Medalists
1st place, gold medalist(s)		Nicola Adams	Great Britain
2nd place, silver medalist(s)		Ren Cancan	China
3rd place, bronze medalist(s)		Mary Kom	India
3rd place, bronze medalist(s)		Marlen Esparza	United States

The women's flyweight boxing competition at the 2012 Olympic Games in London was held from 5 to 9 August at the ExCeL Exhibition Centre.

For the first time at an Olympic Games, the 10 men's boxing events was joined by three women's events: flyweight, middleweight, and lightweight.

Nicola Adams from Great Britain won the gold medal — the first Olympic gold ever awarded in women's boxing. Adams beat China's Ren Cancan by 16 points to seven in the final.

== Competition format ==
The competition consisted of a single-elimination tournament. Bronze medals were awarded to both semi-finalists, Marlen Esparza of the United States and Mary Kom of India. Each bout comprised four rounds of two minutes each.

== Schedule ==
All times are British Summer Time (UTC+01:00)

Date	Time	Round
Sunday 5 August 2012	13:30	Round of 16
Monday 6 August 2012	13:30	Quarter-finals
Wednesday 8 August 2012	13:30	Semi-finals
Thursday 9 August 2012	16:30	Final

== Results ==
Round of 16
Elena Savelyeva (RUS)	12
Kim Hye-song (PRK)	9
Érica Matos (BRA)	14
Karlha Magliocco (VEN)	15
Karolina Michalczuk (POL)	14
Mary Kom (IND)	19
Stoyka Petrova (BUL)	23
Siona Fernandes (NZL)	11

Quarter-finals
Ren Cancan (CHN)	12
Elena Savelyeva (RUS)	7
Karlha Magliocco (VEN)	16
Marlen Esparza (USA)	24
Maroua Rahali (TUN)	6
Mary Kom (IND)	15
Stoyka Petrova (BUL)	7
Nicola Adams (GBR)	16

Semi-finals
Ren Cancan (CHN)	10
Marlen Esparza (USA)	8
Mary Kom (IND)	6
Nicola Adams (GBR)	11

Final
Ren Cancan (CHN)	7
Nicola Adams (GBR)	16
