= Jagdish Singh (boxer) =

Indian boxer

Jagdish Singh is an Indian boxer and a boxing coach from Bhiwani district of the Indian state of Haryana. He founded the Bhiwani Boxing Club (BBC) in 2003, which produced four members of the five member boxing team in Beijing Olympics 2008, including the bronze medal winner, Vijender Singh. His five students received Arjun Award. Such as Akhil Kumar 2005, Vijender Singh 2006, Dinesh Kumar 2010, Vikas Krishan Yadav 2012, Kavita Chahal 2013.

The credit for turning Bhiwani into an elite boxing center largely goes to an intrepid Sports Authority of India coach Jagdish Singh, who has been at the center since 1996. He was awarded India's highest honour for sports coaching, the 2007 Dronacharya Award. His 12 students won medals in world championships including 5 gold, 1 silver, and 6 bronze medals in various age groups.

== Career ==
In 2003, Singh established the 'Bhiwani Boxing Club' withdrawing his provident fund, mortgaging his home and land to obtain loan of 4 lakhs from Gramin bank. BBC has a 25-metre track, a multi-utility gym, three punching bags and a mobile boxing ring.

In the 2004 Athens Olympics, three out of the four qualifiers were from Bhiwani. Due to its record of producing competent boxers, Bhiwani is now being called the 'Cuba of India', with more than 10 per cent of the children in the district trying their hand at boxing. Singh received the 2007 Dronacharya Award (highest award conferred on coaches in India) from the Government of India on 29 August 2008. He had threatened not to accept this if none of his quartet went on to win a medal at the Beijing Olympics.

== Olympics 2008 ==
Out of the five Indian boxers in 2008 Beijing Olympics, four have come out of his BBC academy. His wards include the three Indian boxers who have qualified for the quarterfinals at Beijing, viz., Akhil Kumar, Jitender Kumar and lastly Vijender Singh, who eventually won a bronze medal at Beijing Olympics, India's first Boxing medal in the Olympic Games.
