= Christina Cruz =

American boxer (born 1982)

Personal information
- Nickname: The Hells Kitchen Kid
- Born: 12 December 1982 (age 43) New York City, New York, USA
- Height: 5 ft 5 in (165 cm)
- Weight: Flyweight, Bantamweight

Boxing career
- Stance: Orthodox

Boxing record
- Total fights: 8
- Wins: 7
- Win by KO: 0
- Losses: 1
Medal record
Women's amateur boxing
Representing United States
IBA Women's World Boxing Championships
Bronze medal – third place	2012 Qinhuangdao	54kg
Bronze medal – third place	2016 Astana	54kg

Christina Cruz (born 12 December 1982) is an American professional boxer. She challenged for the IBF female flyweight title in 2024. As an amateur, Cruz won two World Championship bronze medals.

== Amateur career ==
A seven-time national amateur champion and record-setting 10-time New York Golden Gloves winner, Cruz won bronze medals in the 54 kg category at the 2012 and 2016 Women's World Boxing Championships.

Having failed to make the United States team for three Olympics, she was approached to represent Puerto Rico, qualifying through family ties, at the 2020 Tokyo Games and won the trials to secure a spot, only for the event to be postponed because of the COVID-19 pandemic. When the Olympics were rescheduled for 2021, a new qualification criteria was put in place and Cruz missed out.

== Professional career ==
Cruz turned professional in 2021, making her debut in the paid ranks at Madison Square Garden Theater in New York on 3 August that year, defeating Indeya Smith via majority decision over four rounds.

With a perfect record of six wins from six pro-fights, Cruz challenged IBF female flyweight champion Gabriela Fundora at the Footprint Center in Phoenix, Arizona, on 27 January 2024. She lost by stoppage in the 10th and final round.

== Professional boxing record ==
8 fights	7 wins	1 loss
By knockout	0	1
By decision	7	0

No.	Result	Record	Opponent	Type	Round, time	Date	Location	Notes
8	Win	7–1	Randee Lynn Morales	UD	6	7 Aug 2026	El Paso County Coliseum, El Paso, Texas, U.S	
7	Loss	6–1	Gabriela Fundora	TKO	10 (10), 0:59	27 Jan 2024	Footprint Center, Phoenix, Arizona, U.S	For the IBF female flyweight title
6	Win	6–0	Josefina Vega	UD	6	10 Oct 2023	Sony Hall, New York, U.S	
5	Win	5–0	Nancy Franco	UD	8	10 Aug 2023	Sony Hall, New York, U.S	
4	Win	4–0	Amy Salinas	UD	8	20 Jan 2023	Kissimmee Civic Center, Kissimmee, Florida, U.S	
3	Win	3–0	Maryguenn Vellinga	UD	4	11 Jun 2022	Madison Square Garden Theater, New York, U.S	
2	Win	2–0	Maryguenn Vellinga	UD	6	27 Nov 2021	Madison Square Garden Theater, New York, U.S	
1	Win	1–0	Indeya Smith	MD	4	3 Aug 2021	Madison Square Garden Theater, New York, U.S	
