= Boxing at the 2018 Commonwealth Games – Women's featherweight =

Boxing competitions

Boxing – Women's featherweight at the 2018 Commonwealth Games
- Venue: Oxenford Studios
- Dates: 7 – 14 April 2018
- Competitors: 10 from 10 nations

Medalists
gold medal	Skye Nicolson	Australia
silver medal	Michaela Walsh	Northern Ireland
bronze medal	Alexis Pritchard	New Zealand
bronze medal	Sabrina Aubin-Boucher	Canada

The women's featherweight boxing competitions at the 2018 Commonwealth Games in Gold Coast, Australia took place between 7 and 14 April at Oxenford Studios. Women featherweights were limited to those boxers weighing less than 57 kilograms. This event made its Commonwealth Games debut.

Like all Commonwealth boxing events, the competition was a straight single-elimination tournament. Both semifinal losers were awarded bronze medals, so no boxers competed again after their first loss. Bouts consisted of three rounds of three minutes each, with one-minute breaks between rounds. Beginning this year, the competition was scored using the "must-ten" scoring system.

== Schedule ==
The schedule is as follows:

All times are Australian Eastern Standard Time (UTC+10)

Date	Time	Round
Saturday 7 April 2018	14:02	Round of 16
Tuesday 10 April 2018	15:02	Quarter-finals
Friday 13 April 2018	21:02	Semi-finals
Saturday 14 April 2018	19:47	Final

== Results ==
The draw is as follows:

Round of 16
Mantoa Ranone (LES)
Alexis Pritchard (NZL)	RSC
Valerian Spicer (DMA)	1
Vikki Glover (SCO)	4

Quarterfinals
Keshani Hansika (SRI)	0
Alexis Pritchard (NZL)	5
Michaela Walsh (NIR)	RSC
Keamogetse Kenosi (BOT)
Skye Nicolson (AUS)	5
Christelle Ndiang (CMR)	0
Vikki Glover (SCO)	2
Sabrina Aubin-Boucher (CAN)	3

Semifinals
Alexis Pritchard (NZL)	1
Michaela Walsh (NIR)	4
Skye Nicolson (AUS)	4
Sabrina Aubin-Boucher (CAN)	1

Final
Michaela Walsh (NIR)	2
Skye Nicolson (AUS)	3
