= Elena Savelyeva =

Russian boxer (born 1984)

Personal information
- Nationality: Russia
- Born: 16 June 1984 (age 42) Tula, Russia
- Weight: Flyweight, Bantamweight

Boxing career
Medal record
Women's amateur boxing
Representing Russia
World Championships
Gold medal – first place	2010 Bridgetown	Bantamweight
Silver medal – second place	2008 Ningbo City	Flyweight
Bronze medal – third place	2012 Qinhuangdao	Flyweight
Bronze medal – third place	2014 Jeju	Bantamweight
European Games
Gold medal – first place	2015 Baku	Bantamweight
European Championships
Gold medal – first place	2011 Rotterdam	Bantamweight
Gold medal – first place	2016 Sofia	Flyweight
Silver medal – second place	2009 Mykolaiv	Light flyweight
Silver medal – second place	2019 Alcobendas	Flyweight
Bronze medal – third place	2014 Bucharest	Bantamweight

Elena Savelyeva (born 16 June 1984) is a Russian world champion boxer, and European champion.

== Boxing career ==
As an amateur, Savelyeva went 134–15–1, winning the world, European (2X) and Russian (6X) championships. When Savelyeva gained more wins, she became co-promoted by Salita Promotions and Russian-based Alexander Nevskiy Promotion Group. During her fourth professional fight Savelyeva, 3–0, 3 KOs, took the leap to 10 rounds and faced former world title challenger Nevenka Mikulic of Croatia, on February 10 at Qin Shi Huang Restaurant in Saint Petersburg, Russia. Savelyeva, 4–0, 3 KOs, returned to the ring on Friday, July 13, 2018, in Herceg Novi, Montenegro, for an eight-round showdown against current number 10 IBF and number 11 WBC contender, Nina Radovanovic, 12–2, 3 KOs, of Serbia. Savelva also fought in November, 2019, in a 6-round flyweight bout at the Kansas Star Arena in Mulvane Kansas against Tatinia Willams(0-2). The fight lasted 36 seconds before Saveleva claimed the win. In 2012, Savelyeva obtained a 12–9 victory at the olympic games in London, U.K.

She represented Russia in the 2012 Summer Olympics taking place in London in the Flyweight Division. By defeating Kim Hye Song of North Korea in the opening round, Savelyeva won the first ever women's boxing bout at the Olympics. In the quarter-finals she lost to Ren Cancan of China 7-12.

== Personal life ==
Savelyeva's mother was an elementary school teacher and her father an electrical engineer. She has one older brother.
