= 2019 AIBA Women's World Boxing Championships – Heavyweight =

Heavyweight at the 2019 AIBA Women's World Boxing Championships
- Venue: FSK Sports Complex
- Location: Ulan-Ude, Russia
- Dates: 10–13 October
- Competitors: 7 from 7 nations

Medalists
gold medal	Danielle Perkins	United States
silver medal	Yang Xiaoli	China
bronze medal	Katsiaryna Kavaleva	Belarus
bronze medal	Dina Islambekova	Kazakhstan

The Heavyweight competition at the 2019 AIBA Women's World Boxing Championships was held between 10 and 13 October 2019.

== Schedule ==
The schedule was as follows:

Date	Time	Round
Thursday 10 October 2019	15:00	Quarterfinals
Saturday 12 October 2019	15:00	Semifinals
Sunday 13 October 2019	After 16:00	Final

All times are Irkutsk Time (UTC+8)

== Results ==
Quarterfinals
(Kazakhstan) Dina Islambekova	3
(Italy) Flavia Severin	2
(Belarus) Katsiaryna Kavaleva	4
(India) Kavita Chahal	1
(United States) Danielle Perkins	5
(Russia) Kristina Tkacheva	0

Semifinals
(China) Yang Xiaoli	5
(Kazakhstan) Dina Islambekova	0
(Belarus) Katsiaryna Kavaleva
(United States) Danielle Perkins	RSC

Final
(China) Yang Xiaoli	0
(United States) Danielle Perkins	5
