= Elena Vystropova =

Russian-born Azerbaijani boxer

Medal record

Women's boxing

Representing Azerbaijan

World Championships
Silver medal – second place	2012 Qinhuangdao	Middleweight
Bronze medal – third place	2014 Jeju	Welterweight

European Championships
Gold medal – first place	2014 Bucharest	Welterweight

Elena Yevgenyevna Vystropova (Russian: Еле́на Евге́ньевна Выстропова; born 3 November 1988, Sulak, Russia) is a Russian-born Azerbaijani female boxer. At the 2012 Summer Olympics, she competed in the Women's middleweight competition, but was defeated in the first round.
