= Chhotu Loura =

Indian boxer

Medal record

Women's amateur boxing

Representing India

World Championships
Bronze medal – third place	2006 New Delhi	Flyweight
Bronze medal – third place	2008 Ningbo City	Flyweight

Chhotu Loura is an Indian amateur boxer from Haryana.

She represented Indian women's amateur boxing at 50 kg category and won bronze medal in 2006 Women's World Amateur Boxing Championships.
