= Maroua Rahali =

Tunisian boxer

Personal information
- Nationality: Tunisia
- Born: 28 March 1988 (age 38) Gaafour, Tunisia
- Height: 5 ft 6 in (168 cm)
- Weight: Flyweight

Boxing career
Medal record
Representing Tunisia
Women's boxing

Maroua Rahali is a Tunisian national champion boxer. She was born in Gaâfour, a town in north-west Tunisia.

She is coached by Chergui Hamadi. She represented Tunisia in the 2012 Summer Olympics taking place in London in the flyweight division. In the Quarter finals she lost to Mary Kom of India 6-15.

== Achievements ==
- 2011 – International Women's Tournament (Tunis, TUN) 1st place – 51 kg
- 2011 – Tunisian Women's National Championships 1st place – 51 kg
- 2010 – African Cup of Nations (Alger, ALG) 1st place – 51 kg
- 2010 – International Women's Tournament (El-Menzah, TUN) 1st place – 51 kg
- 2009 – Beja Pro-Am Gala (Beja, TUN) 2nd place – 51 kg
