= 2010 AIBA Women's World Boxing Championships =

Boxing competitions

2010 Women's World Amateur Boxing Championships
- Location: Bridgetown, Barbados
- Dates: September 9-18, 2010

The 2010 AIBA Women World Boxing Championships was an international women's boxing competition hosted by Barbados from September 9 to 18, 2010 in Bridgetown. It was the 6th edition of the championship, which debuted in 2001 in Scranton, Pennsylvania, United States.

The World Championship was contested in 10 weight disciplines by 257 amateur women boxers from 66 federations, and was conducted in the Garfield Sobers Gymnasium.

Russia won two gold medals and one silver, while China, the champion in the 2008 edition, finished second with one gold, three silver and three bronze medals, followed by North Korea with one gold and one silver. In all, nine federations provided champions.

== Participating federations ==
- Algeria
- Argentina
- Australia
- Barbados
- Belarus
- Brazil
- Bulgaria
- Burkina Faso
- Canada
- China
- Chinese Taipei
- Costa Rica
- Czech Republic
- Dominican Republic
- Ecuador
- Egypt
- El Salvador
- England
- Finland
- France
- (Georgia (country)) Georgia
- Germany
- Greece
- Grenada
- Guatemala
- Guyana
- Hungary
- India
- (Republic of Ireland) Ireland
- Italy
- Japan
- Kazakhstan
- Kenya
- Kyrgyzstan
- Lithuania
- Mexico
- Moldova
- Morocco
- Myanmar
- Nepal
- Netherlands
- New Zealand
- North Korea
- Norway
- Panama
- Philippines
- Poland
- Puerto Rico
- Romania
- Russia
- Slovenia
- South Korea
- Spain
- Sri Lanka
- Sweden
- Switzerland
- Tajikistan
- Thailand
- Trinidad and Tobago
- Tunisia
- Turkey
- Ukraine
- United States
- Venezuela
- Vietnam
- Wales

== Results ==
Event	Gold	Silver	Bronze
Light flyweight (–48 kg)	Mary Kom; India	Steluța Duță; Romania	Alice Aparri; Philippines Nazgul Boranbayeva; Kazakhstan
Flyweight (–51 kg)	Ren Cancan; China	Nicola Adams; England	Tetyana Kob; Ukraine Hanne Mäkinen; Finland
Bantamweight (–54 kg)	Elena Savelyeva; Russia	Kim Hye-song; North Korea	Karolina Michalczuk; Poland Csilla Némedi Varga; Hungary
Featherweight (–57 kg)	Yun Kum-ju; North Korea	Yang Yanzi; China	Tassamalee Thongjan; Thailand Rim Jouini; Tunisia
Lightweight (–60 kg)	Katie Taylor; Ireland	Dong Cheng; China	Quanitta Underwood; United States Karolina Graczyk; Poland
Light welterweight (–64 kg)	Gülsüm Tatar; Turkey	Vera Slugina; Russia	Klara Svensson; Sweden Cashmere Jackson; United States
Welterweight (–69 kg)	Andrecia Wasson; United States	Savannah Marshall; England	Yang Tingting; China Marichelle Jong; Netherlands
Middleweight (–75 kg)	Mary Spencer; Canada	Li Jinzi; China	Liliya Durnyeva; Ukraine Mária Kovács; Hungary
Light heavyweight (–81 kg)	Roseli Feitosa; Brazil	Marina Volnova; Kazakhstan	Tímea Nagy; Hungary Wang Yanrui; China
Heavyweight (+81 kg)	Nadezda Torlopova; Russia	Kateryna Kuzhel; Ukraine	Li Yunfei; China Kavita Chahal; India

== Medal count table ==
2010 Women's World Boxing Championship
Pos	Country	Gold	Silver	Bronze	Total
1	Russia	2	1	0	3
2	China	1	3	3	7
3	North Korea	1	1	0	2
4	United States	1	0	2	3
5	India	1	0	1	2
6	Brazil	1	0	0	1
6	Canada	1	0	0	1
6	Ireland	1	0	0	1
6	Turkey	1	0	0	1
10	England	0	2	0	2
11	Ukraine	0	1	2	3
12	Kazakhstan	0	1	1	2
13	Romania	0	1	0	1
14	Hungary	0	0	3	3
15	Poland	0	0	2	2
16	Finland	0	0	1	1
16	Netherlands	0	0	1	1
16	Philippines	0	0	1	1
16	Sweden	0	0	1	1
16	Thailand	0	0	1	1
16	Tunisia	0	0	1	1
	Total	10	10	20	40
