= Naomi Fischer-Rasmussen =

Australian boxer (born 1984)

Personal information
- Born: 4 January 1984 (age 42) Perth, Western Australia
- Height: 1.76 m (5 ft 9 1/2 in)

Sport
- Sport: Boxing
- Weight class: Welterweight

Naomi Fischer-Rasmussen (born 4 January 1984) is an Australian boxer from Western Australia. She has held Australian national titles in two weight divisions, and was the only Australian woman selected to represent the country at the 2012 Summer Olympics in boxing. She ranked number one in the world in her weight class in 2011, and finished ninth at the 2012 World Championships.

== Personal ==
Fischer-Rasmussen was born in Perth, Western Australia, and calls Mandurah, Western Australia home.

Having worked as a personal trainer, Fischer-Rasmussen quit her job in 2011 so she could box full-time, saying "When the sport was announced as being on the Olympic program I decided to really focus on it." With Australia's other female boxer having been disqualified from the 2012 Summer Olympics because she consumed a banned substance, Fischer-Rasmussen spends a lot of time thinking about what she eats to prevent a similar fate.

== Boxing ==
Fischer-Rasmussen started boxing when she was nineteen years old. She has held national titles in two separate weight divisions, the first Australian woman to do so, earning them in 2010 in the welterweight and middleweight divisions. She finished 2010 off as the Oceania middleweight champion. In 2011, she was ranked number one in the world in the welterweight division. In February 2012 in Hobart, she finished first at the Australian national championships.

Fischer-Rasmussen initially did not like the requirement to wear a skirt while boxing but subsequently changed her mind, saying "But I think the particular style of skirt, particularly the Adidas ones, they're going to look sexy. They're like little tennis skirts."

=== Olympics ===
The Olympics were a major motivator for Fischer-Rasmussen to take the sport more seriously, saying "When the sport was announced as being on the Olympic program I decided to really focus on it."

Her Olympic qualification path included competing at the 2012 World Championship in China where she finished ninth overall in the middleweight division but finished first amongst Oceania based competitors.

Fischer-Rasmussen was the first female boxer to represent Australia at the Olympics when she competed at the 2012 Summer Olympics. She competed in the 75 kilograms (165 lb) middleweight division. She lost the three round bout to Sweden's Anna Laurell.
