= Tiara Brown =

American boxer (born 1988)

Personal information
- Nickname: The Dark Menace
- Born: June 1, 1988 (age 38) Fort Myers, Florida, U.S.
- Height: 5 ft 7 in (170 cm)
- Weight: Featherweight; Super featherweight Lightweight

Boxing career
- Stance: Orthodox

Boxing record
- Total fights: 21
- Wins: 21
- Win by KO: 11
Medal record
Women's amateur boxing
Representing United States
World Championships
Gold medal – first place	2012 Qinhuangdao	Featherweight
Bronze medal – third place	2014 Edmonton	Featherweight

Tiara Nichelle Brown (born June 1, 1988) is an American professional boxer. She has held the World Boxing Council (WBC) female featherweight title since March 2025.

== Early life ==
Brown was born on June 1, 1988, in Fort Myers, Florida. She began boxing in 2001 at the Fort Myers Police Athletic League. A three-sport athlete at Fort Myers High School, Brown later attended Columbus State University in Columbus, Georgia, on a full scholarship. She was a member of the school's first women's cross country team to compete in the NCAA Division II Championships in 2009. Brown earned a degree in criminal justice and was the first college graduate in her family.

== Boxing career ==
=== Amateur career ===
Brown was a standout amateur, capturing three USA Boxing national titles with gold medals in 2012, 2014, and 2015. Internationally, she claimed gold at the 2012 IBA Women's World Championships—becoming only the third American woman to do so—added a bronze in 2014, and later competed in the 2015 U.S. Olympic Trials.

=== Professional career ===
==== Early career ====
Brown made her professional debut on September 30, 2016, at the Sphinx Club in Washington, D.C., knocking out Khadija Sanders in the first round. She went on to win her next 16 professional fights, compiling an undefeated record of 17 wins, including 11 knockouts.

On January 18, 2025, Brown faced Calista Silgado at the 2300 Arena in Philadelphia, Pennsylvania. She won the fight by unanimous decision, solidifying herself as the WBC's mandatory featherweight title challenger.

==== Brown vs. Nicolson ====
Brown challenged Skye Nicolson for the WBC female featherweight title at Qudos Bank Arena, Sydney Olympic Park, Australia, on March 22, 2025. The WBC unveiled a commemorative "Homecoming" belt to be awarded to the winner of the bout. Brown won the fight by split decision with the judges' scores reading 97–93, 96–94 and 94–96.

==== Brown vs. Gongora ====
Brown made a successful first defense of her WBC featherweight title on September 20, 2025, defeating Emma Gongora by unanimous decision at the Bayou Music Center in Houston, Texas; the judges scored the bout 100–90 and 98–92 twice.

==== Brown vs. Rapp ====
On June 13, 2026, Brown made the second defense of her title against the previously undefeated Hannah Rapp at Caribe Royale Resort in Orlando, Florida, winning via unanimous decision.

==== Brown vs. Scotney ====
Brown was scheduled to defend her title against former undisputed female super-bantamweight world champion Ellie Scotney at College Park Center in Arlington, Texas, on November 8, 2026. However, the fight was cancelled when Scotney withdrew after suffering an injury just over three weeks before it was due to take place.

== Personal life ==
Brown is a former police officer with the Metropolitan Police Department in Washington, D.C., and the Fort Myers Police Department in Fort Myers, Florida In March 2019, she was named Officer of the Year by the Metropolitan Police Department, besting a field of more than 3,000 officers and becoming the first Black female officer to receive the award.

She was named one of three "Top Women Cops Who Boxed in 2018" by the Women Boxing Archive Network (WBAN). The following year, she was the sole recipient of WBAN's "Top Cop" honor for "Women Cops Who Box" in 2019.

In May 2018, Brown signed a promotional contract with DiBella Entertainment. She later fought under the Overtime Boxing promotional banner as part of its OTX Boxing series before its discontinuation, and in January 2026 signed with Most Valuable Promotions.

Her bout against Skye Nicolson on March 22, 2025, was named one of WBAN's Top 12 Fights of the Year. She was named the WBC's Revelation of the Year for 2025.

On April 21, 2025, Fort Myers honored Brown for her excellence in boxing and community service. Through her scholarship program, she awards four annual scholarships to deserving middle school students.

== Professional boxing record ==
21 fights	21 wins	0 losses
By knockout	11	0
By decision	10	0

No.	Result	Record	Opponent	Type	Round, time	Date	Location	Notes
21	Win	21–0	Hannah Rapp	UD	10	Jun 13, 2026	Caribe Royale Resort, Orlando, Florida, U.S.	Retained WBC female featherweight title
20	Win	20–0	Emma Gongora	UD	10	Sep 20, 2025	Bayou Music Center, Houston, Texas, U.S.	Retained WBC female featherweight title
19	Win	19–0	Skye Nicolson	SD	10	Mar 22, 2025	Qudos Bank Arena, Sydney Olympic Park, Australia	Won WBC female featherweight title
18	Win	18–0	Calista Silgado	UD	8	Jan 18, 2025	2300 Arena, Philadelphia, Pennsylvania, U.S.	
17	Win	17–0	Gabriela Bouvier	UD	10	Jun 28, 2024	Overtime Elite Arena, Atlanta, Georgia, U.S.	
16	Win	16–0	Angi Romero	TKO	1 (6), 1:10	Feb 17, 2024	Club La Pradera, Carmen de Apicalá, Colombia	
15	Win	15–0	Liliana Martinez	MD	8	Jun 30, 2023	Club Mauricio Baez, Santo Domingo, Dominican Republic	
14	Win	14–0	Grecia Novas Mateo	TKO	3 (6), 1:30	Feb 10, 2023	Coco Locos Restaurant Sports Bar, Sosúa, Dominican Republic	
13	Win	13–0	Diana Collado	RTD	1 (8), 2:00	Nov 10, 2022	Coco Locos Restaurant Sports Bar, Sosúa, Dominican Republic	
12	Win	12–0	Paulina Cardona	RTD	3 (6), 2:00	Jul 23, 2022	Discoteca Tequila, Melgar, Colombia	
11	Win	11–0	Jenifer Ancelmo Martinez	TKO	5 (6), 2:58	Oct 29, 2021	Big Punch Arena, Tijuana, Mexico	
10	Win	10–0	Simone Aparecida Da Silva	UD	8	Dec 7, 2019	Dulles Sportsplex, Sterling, Virginia, U.S.	
9	Win	9–0	Vanessa Bradford	MD	8	Oct 24, 2019	Generoso Pope Athletic Complex, Brooklyn, New York, U.S.	
8	Win	8–0	Angel Gladney	TKO	6 (10), 0:34	May 18, 2019	Entertainment and Sports Arena, Washington, D.C., U.S.	
7	Win	7–0	Dahiana Santana	RTD	4 (8), 2:00	Dec 8, 2018	Bowie State University, Bowie, Maryland, U.S.	
6	Win	6–0	Jasmine Clarkson	RTD	4 (6), 2:00	Sep 22, 2018	Bowie State University, Bowie, Maryland, U.S.	
5	Win	5–0	Brittany Cruz	TKO	5 (6), 1:49	Jun 30, 2018	Sphinx Club, Washington, D.C., U.S.	
4	Win	4–0	Natalie King	UD	4	Nov 18, 2017	Merrick Recreation Center, Washington, D.C., U.S.	
3	Win	3–0	Tammy Franks	TKO	2 (4), 0:49	Aug 12, 2017	Howard Theatre, Washington, D.C., U.S.	
2	Win	2–0	Natalie King	UD	4	Mar 25, 2017	UDC Physical Activities Center, Washington, D.C., U.S.	
1	Win	1–0	Khadija Sanders	KO	1 (4), 1:13	Sep 30, 2016	Sphinx Club, Washington, D.C., U.S.	

== See also ==
- Women's boxing
- List of female boxers
- List of current female world boxing champions

Sporting positions
World boxing titles
Preceded by Skye Nicolson	WBC female featherweight champion March 22, 2025 – present	Incumbent
Awards
Preceded by Agit Kabayel	WBC Revelation of the Year; 2025	Incumbent
