= 2014 AIBA Women's World Boxing Championships – Welterweight =

Boxing competitions

The Welterweight (69 kg) competition at the 2014 AIBA Women's World Boxing Championships was held from 17–24 November 2014.

== Medalists ==
Gold	Atheyna Bylon (PAN)
Silver	Saadat Abdulaeva (RUS)
Bronze	Elena Vystropova (AZE)
Bronze	Erika Guerrier (FRA)

== Draw ==
=== Top half ===
First Round
(England) Stacey Copeland	0
(Azerbaijan) Elena Vystropova	3
(Canada) Myriam da Silva	2
(Brazil) Jessica Carlini	1
(Romania) Cristina Stancu	0
(Republic of Ireland) Clare Grace	3
(India) Neetu	0
(Panama) Atheyna Bylon	3

Second Round
(Chinese Taipei) Chen Chia-chun	0
(Azerbaijan) Elena Vystropova	3
(Canada) Myriam da Silva	0
(United States) Danyelle Wolf	3
(Turkey) Gülüzar Kara	WO
(Republic of Ireland) Clare Grace
(Panama) Atheyna Bylon	2
(Wales) Lauren Price	1

Quarterfinals
(Azerbaijan) Elena Vystropova	2
(United States) Danyelle Wolf	1
(Turkey) Gülüzar Kara	0
(Panama) Atheyna Bylon	3

Semifinals
(Azerbaijan) Elena Vystropova	1
(Panama) Atheyna Bylon	2

=== Bottom half ===
First Round
(Mongolia) Nyamjargalyn Bayantsetseg	0
(Kazakhstan) Dariga Shakimova	3
(South Korea) Park Ji-min	1
(Argentina) Lucía Pérez	2
(Czech Republic) Ester Konečná	0
(Germany) Nadine Apetz	3
(China) Dou Dan	TKO
(Hungary) Nikolett Pap

Second Round
(Russia) Saadat Abdulaeva	3
(Kazakhstan) Dariga Shakimova	0
(Argentina) Lucía Pérez	0
(Ukraine) Mariia Bova	3
(France) Erika Guerrier	3
(Germany) Nadine Apetz	0
(China) Dou Dan	3
(Spain) Tamara Garcìa	0

Quarterfinals
(Russia) Saadat Abdulaeva	2
(Ukraine) Mariia Bova	0
(France) Erika Guerrier	TKO
(China) Dou Dan

Semifinals
(Russia) Saadat Abdulaeva	2
(France) Erika Guerrier	0

=== Final ===
Final
(Panama) Atheyna Bylon	2
(Russia) Saadat Abdulaeva	1
