= Alexis Pritchard =

New Zealand boxer (born 1983)

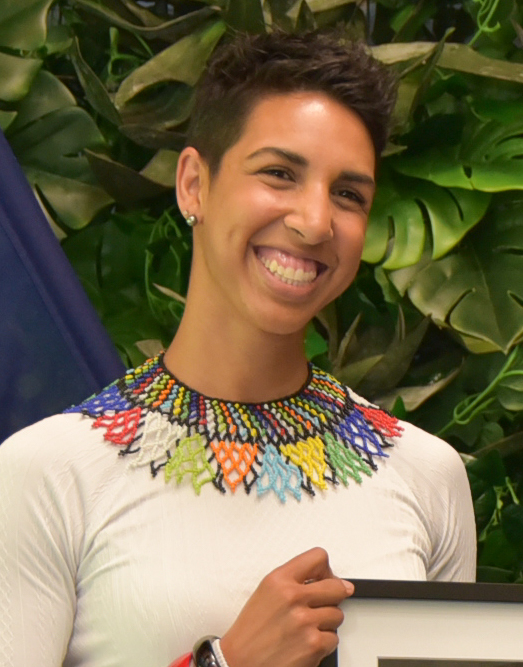
- Pritchard in 2020

Personal information
- Nationality: New Zealand
- Born: 24 September 1983 (age 42) Bellville, Western Cape; South Africa
- Height: 5 ft 10 in (178 cm)
- Weight: lightweight (60kg)

Boxing career
Medal record
Women's amateur boxing
Representing New Zealand
Commonwealth Games
Bronze medal – third place	2018 Gold Coast	Featherweight

Alexis Pritchard (born 24 September 1983) is a South-African born New Zealand boxer. On 5 August 2012 she became the first New Zealand woman to win an Olympic bout when she beat Tunisia's Rim Jouini in the Round of 16.

She moved to New Zealand at the age of 14 and originally took up boxing in 2003 to get fit.

Pritchard retired whilst still the New Zealand champion but after failing to qualify for the Rio Olympics. She was a batonbearer for the 2022 Commonwealth Games Queen's Baton Relay when the baton came to Auckland in March 2022.

Pritchard has the record for the most New Zealand national amateur championships with 11 national titles, beating Daniella Smith's 4 title record.
