= Saida Khassenova =

Kazakhstani boxer (born 1986)

Saida Khassenova (born 19 August 1986, Karaganda, Kazakh SSR, Soviet Union) is a Kazakhstani boxer. At the 2012 Summer Olympics, she competed in the Women's lightweight competition, but was defeated in the first round.
