= Dina Islambekova =

Kazakh boxer (born 2000)

Personal information
- Nationality: Kazakhstani
- Born: 10 August 2000 (age 25)

Boxing career
- Weight class: Heavyweight

Boxing record
- Total fights: 1
- Wins: 1
- Win by KO: 0
- Losses: 0
- Draws: 0
- No contests: 0
Medal record
Women's amateur boxing
Representing Kazakhstan
World Championships
| Bronze medal – third place | 2019 Ulan-Ude | Heavyweight |

Dina Islambekova (born 10 August 2000) is a Kazakhstani boxer.

She won a medal at the 2019 AIBA Women's World Boxing Championships.
