= Mahjouba Oubtil =

Moroccan boxer

Mahjouba Oubtil (born 15 December 1982) is a Moroccan female boxer. At the 2012 Summer Olympics, she competed in the Women's lightweight competition, but was defeated in the second round by Adriana Araújo of Brazil.
