= Mihaela Lăcătuș =

Romanian boxer

Mihaela Lăcătuș is a Romanian female boxer. At the 2012 Summer Olympics, she competed in the Women's lightweight competition, but was defeated in the first round.
