= Saadat Dalgatova =

Russian boxer (born 1988)

Personal information
- Nationality: (Russia) Russian
- Born: 30 October 1988 (age 37) Makhachkala Dagestan

Boxing career
- Weight class: Welterweight

Boxing record
- Total fights: 7
- Wins: 4
- Win by KO: 0
- Losses: 3
- Draws: 0
- No contests: 0
Medal record
Women's amateur boxing
Representing Russia
World Championships
Silver medal – second place	2014 Jeju	Welterweight
Bronze medal – third place	2019 Ulan-Ude	Welterweight
European Championships
Bronze medal – third place	2016 Sofia	Welterweight
World Military Boxing Championships
Gold medal – first place	2021 Moscow	Welterweight

Saadat Gadzhievna Dalgatova, née Abdulaeva (born 30 October 1988) is a Russian female boxer. Honored Master of Sports of Russia (2022), participant in the 2020 Olympic Games, silver and bronze medalist of the World Championship (2014, 2019), bronze medalist of the European Championship (2016), world champion among military personnel (2021), amateur champion of the All-Russian Spartakiad (2022).

== Amateur career ==
A native of Makhachkala Dagestan. The first coach is Alexey Shakhsinov. Lives and trains in Moscow (coaches — A. Frolov, D. Talibov N.M., Lisitsyn V.V.). Played for CSKA. Member of the Russian national team since 2012.

=== Women's World Boxing Championship 2014 ===
Silver medalist of the 2014 World Championship (up to 69 kg). On the way to the final, Abdulaeva defeated rivals from Kazakhstan, Ukraine and France. In the final, she lost to Atheina Baylon from Panama.

=== European Championship 2016 ===
Bronze medalist of the European Championship 2016 (up to 69 kg).

=== Championships of Russia ===
Champion of Russia (2012, 2015, 2016, 2017, 2019, 2020, 2021 - up to 69 kg). Silver medalist of the Russian Championship (2013 - up to 69 kg).

=== Women's World Boxing Championship 2019 ===
In the round of 16 of the Pre-Olympic World Championship 2019, which took place in Ulan-Ude in October, Saadat defeated the Mongolian athlete Enkhbaataryn Erdenetuya with a score of 5:0. In the 1/8 finals, she defeated Nadine Apetz from Germany (5:0). In the 1/4 finals, Abdullaeva defeated the American Osha Jones by a split decision (4:1). The Russian athlete ended this championship with a semi-final duel, losing to the Turkish athlete Busenaz Syurmeneli by a separate decision of the judges. As a result, at the eleventh Women's World Boxing Championships, she won a bronze medal.

=== 2020 Olympic Games ===
In June 2021, she passed qualification for the 2020 Summer Olympics. And in July 2021, she participated in the Olympic Games in Tokyo, but in the 1/16 finals she lost with a score of 1: 4 to a boxer from Thailand Bison Manikon.

At the end of September 2021, he became the champion at the 58th Military World Championship in Moscow (Russia) held under the auspices of the International Military Sports Council, in the final, by unanimous decision, defeating the Brazilian boxer Barbara Maria Santos.

== Honorary Title ==
By order of the Minister of Sports No. 109-ng dated August 8, 2015, Saadat was awarded the sports title Master of Sports of Russia of international class

== Personal life ==
In 2016 she married Shamil Dalgatov, and in 2018 they had a daughter.
