= Boxing at the 2012 Summer Olympics – Women's lightweight =

Boxing competitions

Women's lightweight boxing at the Games of the XXX Olympiad
- Venue: ExCeL Exhibition Centre
- Date: 5 to 9 August 2012
- Competitors: 12 from 12 nations

Medalists
1st place, gold medalist(s)		Katie Taylor	Ireland
2nd place, silver medalist(s)		Sofya Ochigava	Russia
3rd place, bronze medalist(s)		Mavzuna Chorieva	Tajikistan
3rd place, bronze medalist(s)		Adriana Araujo	Brazil

The women's lightweight boxing competition at the 2012 Olympic Games in London was held from 5 to 9 August at the ExCeL Exhibition Centre.

For the first time at an Olympic Games, the ten men's boxing events were joined by three women's events: flyweight, middleweight and lightweight.

Katie Taylor from Ireland won the gold medal — the first of the 2012 Games for the country. Taylor defeated Russia's Sofya Ochigava in the final.

Bronze medals were awarded to both semi-final losers: Adriana Araujo from Brazil and Mavzuna Chorieva from Tajikistan — the latter being the country's only medal at the 2012 Games.

== Competition format ==
The competition consisted of a single-elimination tournament. Bronze medals were awarded to both semi-final losers. Bouts were four rounds of two minutes each.

== Schedule ==
All times are British Summer Time (UTC+01:00)

Date	Time	Round
Sunday 5 August 2012	14:30	Round of 16
Monday 6 August 2012	14:30	Quarter-finals
Wednesday 8 August 2012	14:00	Semi-finals
Thursday 9 August 2012	16:45	Final

== Results ==
Round of 16
Quanitta Underwood (USA)	13
Natasha Jonas (GBR)	21
Dong Cheng (CHN)	10
Mihaela Lăcătuș (ROU)	5
Saida Khassenova (KAZ)	14
Adriana Araujo (BRA)	16
Alexis Pritchard (NZL)	15
Rim Jouini (TUN)	10

Quarter-finals
Katie Taylor (IRL)	26
Natasha Jonas (GBR)	15
Dong Cheng (CHN)	8
Mavzuna Chorieva (TJK)	13
Mahjouba Oubtil (MAR)	12
Adriana Araujo (BRA)	16
Alexis Pritchard (NZL)	4
Sofya Ochigava (RUS)	22

Semi-finals
Katie Taylor (IRL)	17
Mavzuna Chorieva (TJK)	9
Adriana Araujo (BRA)	11
Sofya Ochigava (RUS)	17

Final
Katie Taylor (IRL)	10
Sofya Ochigava (RUS)	8

== International media coverage of Taylor ==
Katie Taylor's Olympic boxing success led to inaccurate coverage in the international media. While previewing her semi-final bout, The Daily Telegraph, a conservative English newspaper, incorrectly referred to Taylor as "British", prompting fierce criticism from other media outlets, and an apology from the Telegraph. Fairfax Media of Australia also issued an apology, after articles published in The Age, Brisbane Times and The Sydney Morning Herald were widely condemned as "lazy stereotyping" of the Irish. Irish Ambassador to Australia Noel White issued a formal complaint about the article's reliance on Guinness, whiskey and potatoes to make a story. USA Today was criticised after its article said: “Back home on the emerald-green isle, pints of Guinness flowed freely, perhaps enough to replenish the Irish Sea. The "punters" inside betting parlors [sic] wagered pounds [sic] as if they were bits of candy. It is not hyperbole to suggest that, when Taylor entered the ring, the weight of a prideful, scuffling nation rested on her muscular shoulders.” Also, Australian commentator Russell Barwick provoked "fury" while on ESPN, comparing Team Ireland's independence from Team GB to Tasmanian athletes not performing for Australia.
