= Katsiaryna Kavaleva =

Belarusian boxer (born 1991)

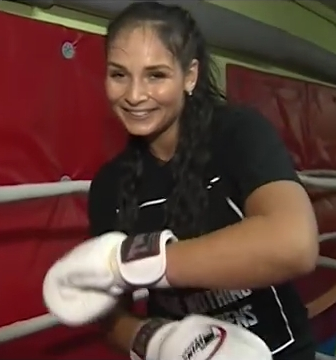

Personal information
- Nationality: Belarusian
- Born: 17 February 1991 (age 35) Mogilev, Byelorussian SSR, Soviet Union (now Mahilyow, Belarus)
- Height: 1.94 m (6 ft 4 in)
- Weight: 106 kg (234 lb)

Boxing career
- Weight class: Heavyweight

Boxing record
- Total fights: 1
- Wins: 1
- Win by KO: 0
- Losses: 0
- Draws: 0
- No contests: 0
Medal record
Women's amateur boxing
Representing Belarus
World Championships
Bronze medal – third place	2019 Ulan-Ude	Heavyweight

Katsiaryna Kavaleva (born 17 February 1991) is a Belarusian boxer.

She won a medal at the 2019 AIBA Women's World Boxing Championships.
