= 2018 AIBA Women's World Boxing Championships – Light flyweight =

Boxing competitions

Light flyweight at the 2018 AIBA Women's World Boxing Championships
- Dates: 16–24 November
- Competitors: 26 from 26 nations

Medalists
gold medal	Mary Kom	India
silver medal	Hanna Okhota	Ukraine
bronze medal	Madoka Wada	Japan
bronze medal	Kim Hyang-mi	North Korea

The Light flyweight (45-48 kg) competition at the 2018 AIBA Women's World Boxing Championships was held from 16 to 24 November 2018.

== Draw ==
Round of 32
16 Nov
(Spain) Laura Fuertes	0
(Romania) Steluța Duță	5
16 Nov
(Bulgaria) Sevda Asenova	5
(Australia) Astryd Ugarte	0
16 Nov
(Japan) Madoka Wada	RSC
(Bangladesh) Farjana
16 Nov
(Germany) Marie Maciejewski	0
(Ukraine) Hanna Okhota	5
16 Nov
(France) Marie Connan	0
(Algeria) Roumaysa Boualam	5
16 Nov
(South Korea) Bak Cho-rong	RSC
(Cayman Islands) Brandy Barnes
16 Nov
(Belarus) Volha Lushchyk
(Chinese Taipei) Pin Meng-chieh	DSQ
16 Nov
(Thailand) Chuthamat Raksat	1
(China) Wu Yu	4
16 Nov
(Russia) Ekaterina Paltseva	0
(Philippines) Josie Gabuco	5
16 Nov
(Kazakhstan) Aigerim Kassenayeva	3
(United States) Jazzelle Bobadilla	2

Round of 16
18 Nov
(Mongolia) Ochirbatyn Jargalan	2
(Romania) Steluța Duță	3
18 Nov
(Bulgaria) Sevda Asenova	1
(Japan) Madoka Wada	4
18 Nov
(Italy) Roberta Bonatti	0
(Ukraine) Hanna Okhota	5
18 Nov
(Algeria) Roumaysa Boualam	2
(Turkey) Ayşe Çağırır	3
18 Nov
(Uzbekistan) Gulasal Sultonalieva	0
(South Korea) Bak Cho-rong	5
18 Nov
(Chinese Taipei) Pin Meng-chieh	2
(North Korea) Kim Hyang-mi	3
18 Nov
(China) Wu Yu	4
(Philippines) Josie Gabuco	1
18 Nov
(Kazakhstan) Aigerim Kassenayeva	0
(India) Mary Kom	5

Quarterfinals
20 Nov
(Romania) Steluța Duță	2
(Japan) Madoka Wada	3
20 Nov
(Ukraine) Hanna Okhota	5
(Turkey) Ayşe Çağırır	0
20 Nov
(South Korea) Bak Cho-rong	0
(North Korea) Kim Hyang-mi	5
20 Nov
(China) Wu Yu	0
(India) Mary Kom	5

Semifinals
22 Nov
(Japan) Madoka Wada	0
(Ukraine) Hanna Okhota	5
22 Nov
(North Korea) Kim Hyang-mi	0
(India) Mary Kom	5

Final
24 Nov
(Ukraine) Hanna Okhota	0
(India) Mary Kom	5
