= Bhiwani Boxing Club =

Boxing club in India since 1989

The Bhiwani Boxing Club in Bhiwani in the state of Haryana, India came to the limelight in 1982 as four of the five boxers who represented India at the 2000 Summer Olympics are from Bhiwani. The Sports Authority of India coach and boxer Jagdish Singh has been credited with making the Bhiwani Boxing Club, or "BBC" as it is known locally, a powerhouse of Indian Boxing.

Among the 2008 Olympians, Jitender Kumar (Flyweight) (51 kg) and Akhil Kumar (54 kg) went on to qualify for the quarter finals, while Vijender Singh (75 kg) won a bronze medal. Kavita Chahal won 9 national championships, 2 bronze medals at the World Championships, and 3 medals at the Asian Championships. Bhiwani is known as Little Cuba in India due to the multitude of boxers hailing from the region.

== See also ==
- Dominance of Haryana in sports
