= Raquel Miller =

American boxer (born 1985)

Personal information
- Nickname: Pretty Beast
- Nationality: American
- Born: February 15, 1985 (age 41) San Francisco, California, U.S.
- Height: 5 ft 8 in (173 cm)
- Weight: Light middleweight; Middleweight; Welterweight; Super-welterweight

Boxing career
- Stance: Orthodox

Boxing record
- Total fights: 13
- Wins: 13
- Win by KO: 6
- Losses: 0
Medal record
Women's amateur boxing
Representing United States
World Championships
Silver medal – second place	2012 Qinhuangdao	Welterweight

Raquel Elizabeth Miller (born February 15, 1985) is an American professional boxer who has held the WBA interim female super-welterweight title since 2019. As an amateur she won a silver medal in the welterweight category at the 2012 AIBA Women's World Boxing Championships.

== Career ==
Miller won a silver medal at the 2012 AIBA Women's World Boxing Championships in Qinhuangdao, China. She recorded victories over Daena Stephenson of New Zealand, Canada's Myriam Da Silva, Turkish boxer Bilgehan Karabulut and Irina Poteyeva from Russia before losing to Ukraine's Maria Badulina in the final.

She made her professional debut on May 21, 2016, scoring a first-round technical knockout over Sara Flores at the Richmond Memorial Auditorium in Richmond, California.

Miller won the vacant NABF female middleweight title on 18 May 2019, stopping Erin Toughill in the seventh-round at Gardens Casino, Hawaiian Gardens, California. Toughill was knocked to the canvas after just 15 seconds of the opening round but recovered to battle on until round seven when she was dropped again and, despite beating the count, referee Zachary Young waved the fight off.

Miller claimed the vacant interim WBA female super-welterweight World title with a unanimous decision success over Mexico's previously unbeaten Alma Ibarra at Videotron Centre, Quebec City, Canada. Two of the ringside judges scored the contest 98-92 with the third making it 99-91.

In November 2025, Miller signed with Most Valuable Promotions.

== Professional boxing record ==
13 fights	13 wins	0 losses
By knockout	6	0
By decision	7	0

No.	Result	Record	Opponent	Type	Round, time	Date	Location	Notes
13	Win	13–0	(Colombia) Angie Paola Rocha	TKO	1 (6), 1:50	March 10, 2023	Escobedo, Nuevo León, Mexico	
12	Win	12–0	(Brazil) Sheila Cunha	TKO	1 (8), 2:15	September 8, 2022	Cuidad Deportiva Heiner Ugalde, Hatillo, San Jose, Costa Rica	
11	Win	11–0	(United States) Sonya Dreiling	UD	6	December 2, 2021	(United States) The Hangar, Costa Mesa, USA	
10	Win	10–0	(Mexico) Alma Ibarra	UD	10	Nov 23, 2019	Videotron Centre, Quebec City, Canada	Won vacant WBA interim female super welterweight title
9	Win	9–0	(United States) Erin Toughill	KO	7 (8), 1:01	May 18, 2019	(United States) Gardens Casino, Hawaiian Gardens, California, U.S.	Won vacant WBC-NABF female middleweight title
8	Win	8–0	(United States) Ashleigh Curry	UD	6	Feb 28, 2019	(United States) Hangar No. 2 Love Field, Dallas, Texas, U.S.	
7	Win	7–0	(United States) Tiffany Woodard	UD	6	Jul 14, 2018	(United States) Fairmont Hotel, San Francisco, California, U.S.	
6	Win	6–0	(Hungary) Szilvia Szabados	UD	6	Jun 21, 2018	(United States) Melrose Ballroom, New York, New York, U.S.	
5	Win	5–0	(United States) Lisa Garland	KO	1 (6), 2:00	Oct 21, 2017	(United States) San Francisco Armory, San Francisco, California, U.S.	
4	Win	4–0	(United States) Kita Watkins	UD	6	Aug 19, 2017	(United States) Richmond Memorial Auditorium, Richmond, California, U.S.	
3	Win	3–0	(United States) Latasha Burton	TKO	3 (6), 1:33	Jan 21, 2017	(United States) Alameda County Fairgrounds, Pleasanton, California, U.S.	
2	Win	2–0	(United States) Gabby Holloway	UD	4	Aug 6, 2016	(United States) Oracle Arena, Oakland, California, U.S.	
1	Win	1–0	(United States) Sara Flores	TKO	1 (4), 1:14	May 21, 2016	(United States) Richmond Memorial Auditorium, Richmond, California, U.S.	
