= Kim Hye-song (boxer) =

North Korean boxer (born 1984)

Personal information
- Nationality: North Korea
- Born: 2 December 1984 (age 41) South Hamgyong Province, North Korea
- Weight: Flyweight

Boxing career
Medal record
Representing North Korea
Women's boxing
Women's World Amateur Boxing Championships
Silver medal – second place	2010 Bridgetown	54 kg
Asian Women's Boxing Championship
Silver medal – second place	2010 Astana	54 kg
Asian Cup Women's Boxing Tournament
Gold medal – first place	2011 Haikou	54 kg

- Kim Hye-song
- Hangul: 김혜성
- RR: Gim Hyeseong
- MR: Kim Hyesŏng

Kim Hye-song (Korean: 김혜성; born 2 December 1984) is a North Korean world championship silver medallist boxer. She was born in South Hamgyong Province.

She represented North Korea in the 2012 Summer Olympics taking place in London in the flyweight division. She lost 9–12 in the Round of 16 to Russia's Elena Savelyeva in the first ever women's boxing bout at the Olympics.

== Achievements ==
- 2012 – DPR Women's National Championships 1st place – 51 kg
- 2011 – Asian Cup Women's Boxing Tournament (Haikou, CHN) 1st place – 54 kg
- 2010 – AIBA Women's World Championships (Bridgetown, BAR) 2nd place – 54 kg
- 2010 – Asian Women's Boxing Championships (Astana, KAZ) 2nd place – 54 kg
- 2010 – North Korean Women's National Championships 1st place – 54 kg
