= Roseli Feitosa =

Brazilian boxer (born 1989)

Personal information
- Born: 15 March 1989 (age 37) São Paulo, Brazil

Sport
- Sport: Boxing
Medal record
Representing Brazil
World Championships
Gold medal – first place	2010 Bridgetown	Light heavyweight
Pan American Games
Bronze medal – third place	2011 Guadalajara	Light heavyweight

Roseli Amaral Feitosa (born 15 March 1989) is a Brazilian female boxer. At the 2012 Summer Olympics, she competed in the Women's middleweight competition, but was defeated by eventual bronze medalist Li Jinzi in the first round.

Roseli was approximately 5 feet 8 inches (173 cm) tall and weighed 174 lbs (79 kg).
