= Kavita Chahal =

Indian boxer (born 1985)

Personal information
- Nationality: Indian
- Born: Kavita Chahal; 8 April 1985 (age 41) Nimri, Haryana, India
- Height: 1.75 m (5 ft 9 in)
- Weight: 81 kg (179 lb)

Boxing career

Kavita Chahal
Sport
- Coached by: Jagdish Singh
Medal record
Representing India
Women's boxing
World Police Games
Gold medal – first place	2019 Chengdu	81+kg
Gold medal – first place	2017 California	81+kg
Gold medal – first place	2013 Belfast	81+Kg
AIBA Women's World Boxing Championships
Bronze medal – third place	2010 Bridgetown	81+Kg
Bronze medal – third place	2012 Qinhuangdao	81+Kg
Asian Championships
Silver medal – second place	2008 Guwahati	81+Kg
Bronze medal – third place	2010 Astana	81+Kg
Bronze medal – third place	2012 Ulaanbaatar	81+Kg
Asian Cup Women's Boxing Tournament
Bronze medal – third place	2011 Haikou	81+Kg

Kavita Chahal (born 8 April 1985) is a 5' 9" tall heavyweight Indian female boxer and recipient of the highest world ranking 2 from 2012 to 2014 (AIBA Ranking - 11 in 2016) from the village Nimri which resides in the Bhiwani district, Haryana. In recognition of her achievements, the Government of India presented Chahal with the Arjuna Award in 2013. Chahal is the first female boxer from Haryana to be presented with the Arjuna Award. Chahal is a twice-consecutive World Championship medallist, 3 Time Gold medalist in World Police Games. 4-Time Asian championship, Asian cup medallist. With 9 gold medals, she is a record holder in women's national championship boxing. She is a 5-time gold medallist in the Federation Cup, and 7-times gold medalist in all India police games 2012 to 2018. Chahal 3-time gold medallist in the Inter-zonal Super Cup championship.

== Early life ==
Kavita was born to Sh. Bhup Singh and Ramesh Devi on 8 April 1985 at Nimri in the Bhiwani district of Haryana (India). Bhiwani is a well-known area in national boxing and also known for the amateur-turned professional boxer Vijender Singh.

Her initial training at boxing was handled by her father Bhup Singh, also a boxer. Once she had progressed, she then went on to train at the Bhiwani Boxing Club under the coach Jagdish Singh, who also handles the training of the Indian Ace Male Pugilist.

After winning medals and accolades for her state, and India, she went on to also become the first female boxer of Haryana state to be presented with the Arjun Award in 2013.

== International achievements ==
SN	Tournament	Year	Venue	Result
1	World Women Boxing Championship	16-24 November 2014	Jeju City, Korea	5th
2	3rd Nations Cup	12 January 2014	Serbia	Bronze
3	World Police Games	1-10 Aug 2013	Ireland	Gold
4	7th World Women‟s Boxing Championship	9-20 May 2012	China	Bronze
5	6th Asian Women‟s Boxing Championship	16-26 March 2012	Mongolia	Bronze
6	1st Asian Cup Women's Boxing Tournament	7-8 May 2011	Haikou, China	Bronze
7	6th World Women Boxing Championship	7-19 September 2010	Barbados, West indies	Bronze
8	5th Asian Women Boxing Championship	23-31 May 2010	Astana, Kazakisthan	Bronze
9	International Prime Ministry Boxing Tournament	7 to 11 April 2010	Turkey	Bronze
10	International Prime Ministry Boxing Tournament	2009	Turkey	QF
11	4th ASIAN WOMEN BOXING CHAMPIONSHIP	2008	Guwahati	Silver
12	DUAL TRAINING AND COMPETITION	2008	Canada	Silver

== National level achievements ==
S.No	Tournament	Date	Venue	Position
1	All India Police Games	1 March 2015 to 5 March 2015	New Delhi	Gold
2	1st Monnet Elite Women National Boxing Championship	11-16 October 2014	Raipur, Chhattisgarh	Gold
3	14th Senior Women National Boxing Championship	18 May 2013 to 23 May 2013	Uttrakhand	Gold
4	13th Senior Women National Boxing Championship	25 Nov. 2012 to 29 Nov. 2012	Guwahati, Assam	Gold
5	61st All India Police Games	Nov. 2012	Delhi	Gold
6	60th All India Police Games	March 2012	Delhi	Gold
7	4th Inter Zonal Women's National Boxing Championship	12 to 15 July 2012	Andhrapradesh	Gold
8	All India Universities	January 2011	Udaipur	Gold
9	3rd Inter Zonal National Women Boxing Championship	2011	Puducherry	Gold
10	12th Sr. Women Boxing Championship	2011	Bhopal	Gold
11	34th Federation Cup Women Boxing Championship	2011	Nanital	Gold
12	1st Interzonal National Women Boxing Championship	2010	Tirupur (Tamil Nadu)	Gold
13	33rd Federation Cup Boxing Championship	18 to 21 November 2010	Nainital	Gold
14	10th Sr. Women national Boxing Championship	2009	Jamshedpur	Gold
15	N.C. Sharma Memorial Federation Cup Women Boxing Championship	2009		Gold
16	Federation Cup Women Boxing Championship	2009	Tamil Nadu	Gold
17	9th Sr. Women National Boxing Championship	November 2008	Agra	Gold
18	Vizag Steel Sr. Women National Boxing Championship	June 2008	Vishakhapatnam	Gold
19	SRM Federation Cup 2007	2007	Kattankulathur, Kanchipuran (Tamil Nadu)	Gold
20	1st All India Women Sr. Boxing Championship	2006	Nainital	Gold
21	11th Senior Women National Boxing Championship	5 to 10 December 2010	Thrissur	Silver
22	7th Sr. Women National Boxing Championship	December 2006	Vishakhakapatnam	Silver
23	34th National Games in Jharkhand	17 to 24 February 2011	Jharkhand	Bronze
24	8th Sr. Women National Boxing Championship	2007	Rudarpur	Bronze
25	33rd National Games	2007	Guwahati	Bronze

== National level records ==
S. No.	Tournament	Date	Venue	Position
1	1st Monnet Elite Women National Boxing Championship	11-16 October 2014	Raipur, Chhattisgarh	Gold
2	14th Senior Women National Boxing Championship	18 May 2013 to 23 May 2013	Uttrakhand	Gold
3	13th Senior Women National Boxing Championship	25 Nov. 2012 to 29 Nov. 2012	Guwahati, Assam	Gold
4	12th Sr. Women Boxing Championship	2011	Bhopal	Gold
5	10th Sr. Women national Boxing Championship	2009	Jamshedpur	Gold
6	9th Sr. Women National Boxing Championship	November 2008	Agra	Gold
7	Vizag Steel Sr. Women National Boxing Championship	June 2008	Vishakhapatnam	Gold
8	1st All India Women Sr. Boxing Championship	2006	Nainital	Gold

== Career best AIBA rankings ==
(81+ KG) EFFECTIVE DATE: JULY 1, 2012
WORLD RANKING	NAME	COUNTRY	POINTS	PREVIOUS RANKING
1	LI, Yunfei	CHINA	2700	1
2	Kavita	INDIA	1700	3
3	YARALI, Semsi	TURKEY	1550	2
4	KUNGEIBAYEVA, Lazzat	KAZAKHSTAN	1400	8
5	SINETSKAY, Irina	RUSSIA	1300	7
6	VERNIC, Danijela	CROATIA	950	14
7	SHAMBIR, Kateryna	UKRAINE	950	11
8	KUZHEL, Kateryna	UKRAINE	800	4
9	CABRERA, Erika	BRAZIL	800	5
10	KRYLOVA, Viktoriya	RUSSIA	800	6
11	PEREZ, Victoria	USA	600	9
12	HAKHVERDYAN, Sona	SWEDEN	600	10
13	BALJINNYAM, Badamkhand	MONGOLIA	500	12
14	KILIC, Burcu	TURKEY	500	13
15	UKHARYOVA, Oxana	KAZAKHSTAN	450	15
16	SZATMARI, Petra	HUNGARY	400	-
17	RICO, Denise	USA	400	16
18	SLOWIK, Anna	POLAND	390	17
19	HOSU, Adriana	ROMANIA	350	18
20	PAWLOWSKA, Izabela	POLAND	300	19
21	GHERGHEL, Diana	ROMANIA	250	-

== Awards and recognitions ==
- Arjun Award in 2013
- Bhim Award in 2014
