= Siona Fernandes =

New Zealand Olympian, PhD, and public health advocate

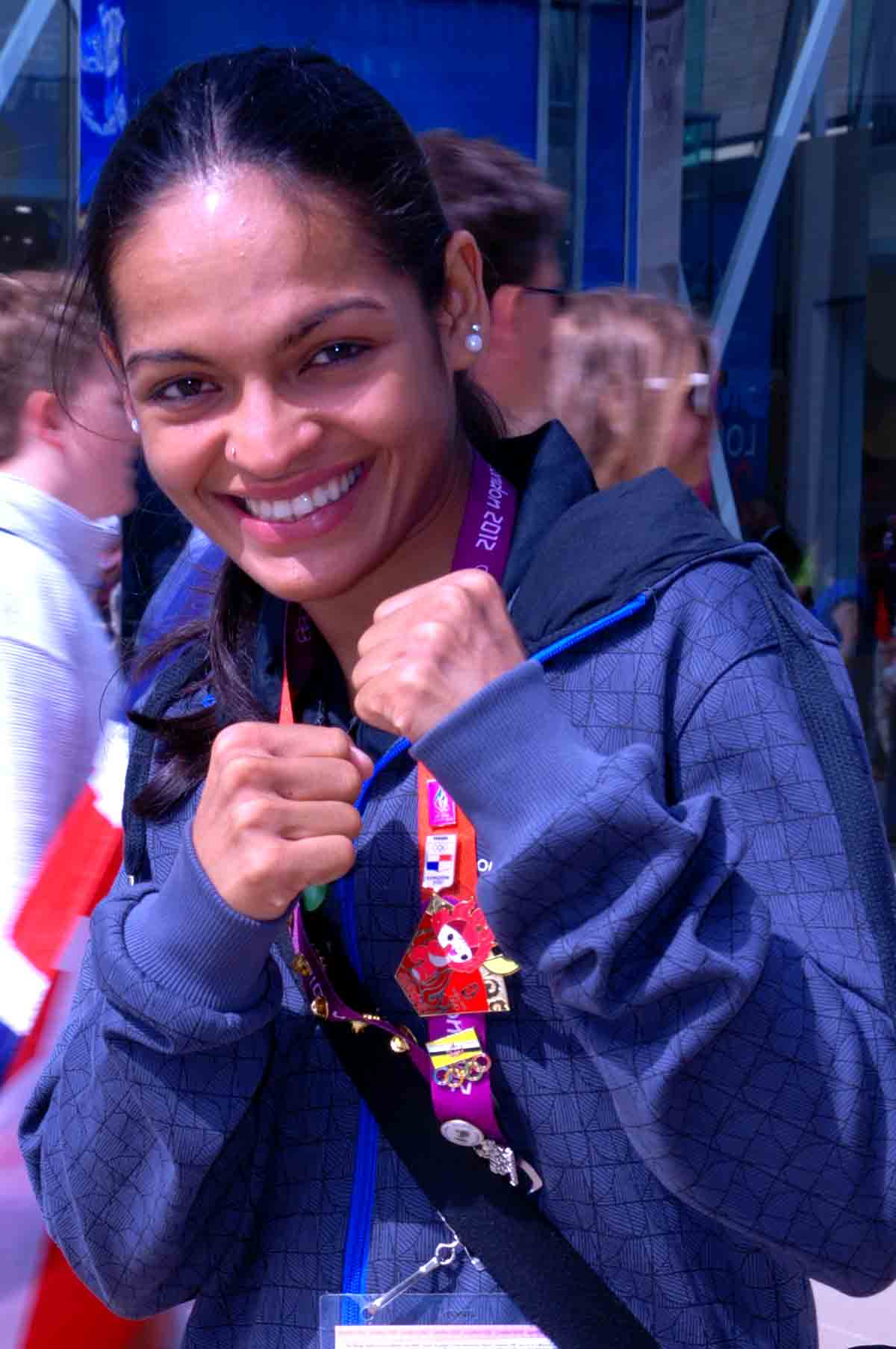
- Fernandes in 2014

Personal information
- Nationality: New Zealand
- Born: 13 November 1982 (age 44) Ribandar, Goa, India
- Height: 5 ft 4 in (163 cm)
- Weight: 51 kg (112 lb)

Boxing career

Siona Fernandes (born 13 November 1982) is a New Zealand boxer. She transitioned from her roots as an Indian classical dancer to an Olympian. Fernandes holds a Doctor of Philosophy, as well as tertiary degrees in psychology, sport, and exercise, coupled with a Bachelor's in Performing Arts. Her doctoral research explored the wider determinants influencing sport and exercise habits among Indian migrants in Australia, with a focus on bridging research and policy.

== Biography ==
Originating from India, Fernandes was the first female chosen from Goa for the Asian Basketball Games and earned the accolade of a 'child prodigy' from the Junior Chamber of India. Fernandes remains the first woman in the flyweight division to represent New Zealand in Boxing at any Olympic Games. She holds several titles and awards in sport including the title of the "Most scientific female boxer" in elite-level female boxing in New Zealand.

== Research and advocacy ==
Beyond sports, Fernandes has led and published peer-reviewed journal articles and industry reports, delving into the realms of participation in sports and physical activities, as well as contributing to the discourse on public health.

== Public engagement ==
Fernandes served as a New Zealand Olympic Sports Ambassador, promoting the values of Olympic sport at national and community levels. As a speaker and educator, Fernandes continues to advocate at the intersections of sports, academia, and public health discourse.
