= Ren Cancan =

Chinese boxer (born 1986)

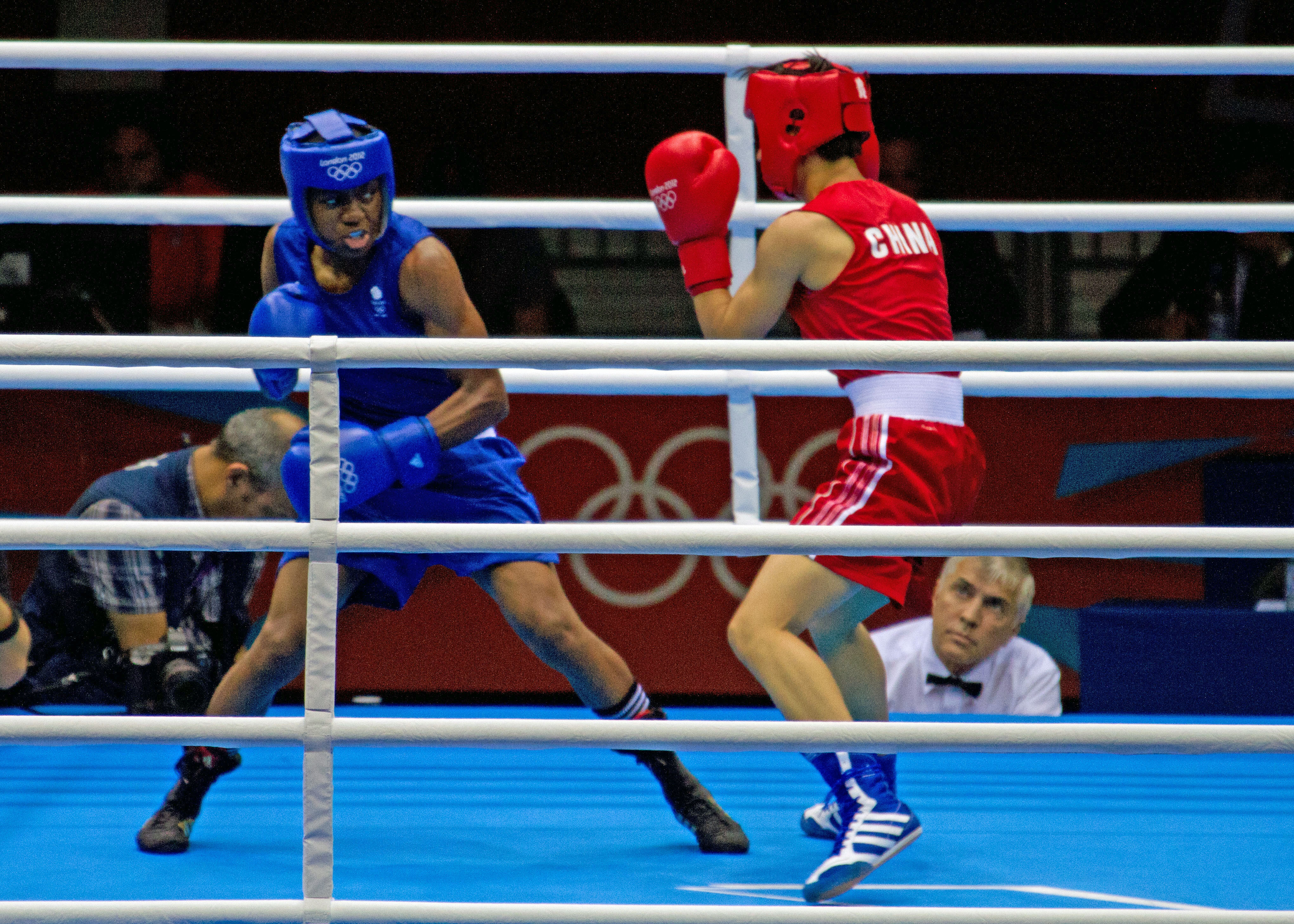
- Nicola Adams v Ren Cancan (in red) at the 2012 Olympics

Personal information
- Nationality: China
- Born: 26 April 1986 (age 40) Jining, Shandong
- Height: 5 ft 6 in (1.68 m)
- Weight: Flyweight

Boxing career
Medal record
Women's amateur boxing
Representing China
Olympic Games
Silver medal – second place	2012 London	Flyweight
Bronze medal – third place	2016 Rio de Janeiro	Flyweight
World Championships
Gold medal – first place	2008 Ningbo	Light bantamweight
Gold medal – first place	2010 Bridgetown	Flyweight
Gold medal – first place	2012 Qinhuangdao	Flyweight
Asian Championships
Gold medal – first place	2015 Wulanchabu	Flyweight
Silver medal – second place	2008 Guwahati	Light bantamweight
Silver medal – second place	2012 Ulaanbaatar	Flyweight
Asian Games
Gold medal – first place	2010 Guangzhou	Flyweight

Ren Cancan (Chinese: 任灿灿; pinyin: Rén Càncàn; born April 26, 1986, in Jining, Shandong) is a female Chinese boxer who has won three world championships. She took up boxing in 2002 and won the silver medal in the 2012 Summer Olympics in London in the Women's Boxing – Flyweight Division as southpaw, she is also a bronze medalist of women's 51 kg title at 2016 Olympics in Rio de Janeiro, Brazil. She lost in both of her Olympic Games to the double-champion Nicola Adams.

Her official birthdate is January 26, 1988, as registered with the international boxing association, but she told Reuters in Chinese through a translator, that her actual birthdate is April 26, 1986. January 26, 1988, is nine months after April 26, 1987, of the prior year, and East Asian age reckoning often used conception date for girls in the past, but that does not explain the extra year discrepancy coming from the translator.

== See also ==
- China at the 2012 Summer Olympics – Boxing
