= Rim Jouini =

Tunisian boxer (born 1980)

Personal information
- Nationality: Tunisia
- Born: 7 August 1980 (age 45)

Sport
- Sport: Boxing
- Event: Flyweight
Medal record
Women's amateur boxing
Representing Tunisia
World Championships
Bronze medal – third place	2010 Bridgetown	Featherweight
African Games
Bronze medal – third place	2015 Brazzaville	Flyweight
- Updated on 18 June 2019

Rim Jouini (born 7 August 1980) is a Tunisian female boxer. At the 2012 Summer Olympics, she competed in the women's lightweight competition, but was defeated in the first round.
