= 2022 IBA Women's World Boxing Championships – Minimumweight =

Minimumweight at the 2022 IBA Women's World Boxing Championships
- Venue: Başakşehir Youth and Sports Facility
- Location: Istanbul, Turkey
- Dates: 10–19 May
- Competitors: 32 from 32 nations

Medalists
gold medal	Ayşe Çağırır	Turkey
silver medal	Alua Balkibekova	Kazakhstan
bronze medal	Aldana López	Argentina
bronze medal	Sevda Asenova	Bulgaria

The Minimumweight competition at the 2022 IBA Women's World Boxing Championships was held from 10 to 19 May 2022.

== Results ==
=== Finals ===
Semi-finals
(Turkey) Ayşe Çağırır	4
(Argentina) Aldana López	1
(Bulgaria) Sevda Asenova
(Kazakhstan) Alua Balkibekova	RSC

Final
(Turkey) Ayşe Çağırır	3
(Kazakhstan) Alua Balkibekova	2

=== Top half ===
==== Section 1 ====
Round of 32
(South Korea) Bak Cho-rong	2
(England) Demie-Jade Resztan	3
(Italy) Roberta Bonatti	2
(Japan) Madoka Wada	3
(Chinese Taipei) Cai Zi-han	2
(France) Rim Bennama	3
(Turkey) Ayşe Çağırır	5
(Uzbekistan) Marjona Savrieva	0

Round of 16
(England) Demie-Jade Resztan	5
(Japan) Madoka Wada	0
(France) Rim Bennama	0
(Turkey) Ayşe Çağırır	5

Quarterfinals
(England) Demie-Jade Resztan	0
(Turkey) Ayşe Çağırır	5

==== Section 2 ====
Round of 32
(Republic of Ireland) Shannon Sweeney	0
(Argentina) Aldana López	5
(Australia) Madeline Bowen	5
(Trinidad and Tobago) Ornella Ramnath	0
(Mongolia) Janchivyn Nyamsüren	3
(Nepal) Susma Tamang	2
(Venezuela) Tayonis Cedeño	5
(Algeria) Fatiha Mansouri	0

Round of 16
(Argentina) Aldana López	w/o
(Australia) Madeline Bowen
(Mongolia) Janchivyn Nyamsüren	0
(Venezuela) Tayonis Cedeño	5

Quarterfinals
(Argentina) Aldana López	5
(Venezuela) Tayonis Cedeño	0

=== Bottom half ===
==== Section 3 ====
Round of 32
(Kenya) Christine Ongare	0
(Ukraine) Hanna Okhota	5
(Slovakia) Nicole Ďuríková	1
(Morocco) Yasmine Mouttaki	4
(Poland) Natalia Rok	5
(Armenia) Gayane Ter-Barseghyan	0
(Tajikistan) Sumaiya Kosimova	0
(Bulgaria) Sevda Asenova	5

Round of 16
(Ukraine) Hanna Okhota	3
(Morocco) Yasmine Mouttaki	2
(Poland) Natalia Rok	2
(Bulgaria) Sevda Asenova	3

Quarterfinals
(Ukraine) Hanna Okhota	2
(Bulgaria) Sevda Asenova	3

==== Section 4 ====
Round of 32
(Spain) Marta López	5
(Vietnam) Nguyễn Thị Thu Nhi	0
(India) Nitu Ghanghas	5
(Romania) Steluța Duță	0
(Canada) Priyanka Dhillon	0
(Kazakhstan) Alua Balkibekova	5
(South Africa) Vuyolwethu Dila	0
(Serbia) Snežana Šiljković	5

Round of 16
(Spain) Marta López	0
(India) Nitu Ghanghas	5
(Kazakhstan) Alua Balkibekova	5
(Serbia) Snežana Šiljković	0

Quarterfinals
(India) Nitu Ghanghas	2
(Kazakhstan) Alua Balkibekova	3
