= 2025 World Boxing Championships – Women's 48 kg =

Competition at amateur boxing tournament

Women's 48 kg at the 2025 World Boxing Championships
- Venue: Liverpool Arena
- Location: Liverpool, England
- Dates: 4–14 September
- Competitors: 18 from 18 nations

Medalists
gold medal	Minakshi Hooda	India
silver medal	Nazym Kyzaibay	Kazakhstan
bronze medal	Sabina Bobokulova	Uzbekistan
bronze medal	Lutsaikhany Altantsetseg	Mongolia

The Women's 48 kg competition at the 2025 World Boxing Championships was held from 4 to 14 September 2025.

== Results ==
=== Final ===
Final; 14 September
Nazym Kyzaibay (KAZ)	1
Minakshi Hooda (IND)	4

=== Top half ===
Preliminaries; 4 September
Sandy Lam (HKG)	0
Lilla Szeleczki (HUN)	5

Round of 16; 9 September
Nazym Kyzaibay (KAZ)	RSC
Lilla Szeleczki (HUN)
Hanna Okhota (UKR)	5
Danisha Mathialagan (SGP)	0
Sabina Bobokulova (UZB)	5
Angelika Krysztoforska (POL)	0
Emma Nesbett (NZL)	0
Giovanna Marchese (ITA)	4

Quarter-finals; 12 September
Nazym Kyzaibay (KAZ)	5
Hanna Okhota (UKR)	0
Sabina Bobokulova (UZB)	5
Giovanna Marchese (ITA)	0

Semi-finals; 13 September
Nazym Kyzaibay (KAZ)	4
Sabina Bobokulova (UZB)	1

=== Bottom half ===
Preliminaries; 4 September
Marta López del Árbol (ESP)	5
Nicole Ďuríková (SVK)	0

Round of 16; 9 September
Minakshi Hooda (IND)	5
Wang Qiuping (CHN)	0
Alice Pumphrey (ENG)	5
Sevda Asenova (BUL)	0
Lutsaikhany Altantsetseg (MGL)	5
Ayşe Çağırır (TUR)	0
Marta López del Árbol (ESP)	0
Hikaru Shinohara (JPN)	5

Quarter-finals; 12 September
Minakshi Hooda (IND)	5
Alice Pumphrey (ENG)	0
Lutsaikhany Altantsetseg (MGL)	5
Hikaru Shinohara (JPN)	0

Semi-finals; 13 September
Minakshi Hooda (IND)	5
Lutsaikhany Altantsetseg (MGL)	0
