= Boxing at the 2022 Mediterranean Games – Women's minimumweight =

Boxing competitions

Women's minimumweight at the 2022 Mediterranean Games
- Venue: EMEC Hall
- Date: 28 June – 1 July
- Competitors: 7 from 7 nations

Medalists
| gold medal | Roumaysa Boualam | Algeria |
| silver medal | Ayşe Çağırır | Turkey |
| bronze medal | Wafa Hafsi | Tunisia |
| bronze medal | Marta López | Spain |

The Women's minimumweight competition of the boxing events at the 2022 Mediterranean Games in Oran, Algeria, was held from 28 June to 1 July at the EMEC Hall.

Like all Mediterranean Games boxing events, the competition was a straight single-elimination tournament. Both semifinal losers were awarded bronze medals, so no boxers competed again after their first loss.

== Results ==
Quarterfinals
Ayşe Çağırır (TUR) | 2
Roberta Bonatti (ITA) | 1
Yasmine Mouttaki (MAR) | 0
Marta López (ESP) | 3
Salma Youssef (EGY)
Roumaysa Boualam (ALG) | RSC

Semifinals
Wafa Hafsi (TUN) | 0
Ayşe Çağırır (TUR) | 3
Marta López (ESP) | 0
Roumaysa Boualam (ALG) | 3

Final
Ayşe Çağırır (TUR) | 1
Roumaysa Boualam (ALG) | 4
