= 2023 IBA Women's World Boxing Championships – Minimumweight =

Minimumweight at the 2023 IBA Women's World Boxing Championships
- Venue: K. D. Jadhav Indoor Hall
- Location: New Delhi, India
- Dates: 18–25 March
- Competitors: 32 from 32 nations

Medalists
gold medal	Nitu Ghanghas	India
silver medal	Lutsaikhany Altantsetseg	Mongolia
bronze medal	Alua Balkibekova	Kazakhstan
bronze medal	Yasmine Moutaqui	Morocco

The Minimumweight competition at the 2023 IBA Women's World Boxing Championships was held between 18 and 25 March 2023.

== Results ==
=== Finals ===
Semi-finals
(Kazakhstan) Alua Balkibekova	2
(India) Nitu Ghanghas	3
(Mongolia) Lutsaikhany Altantsetseg	5
(Morocco) Yasmine Moutaqui	0

Final
(India) Nitu Ghanghas	5
(Mongolia) Lutsaikhany Altantsetseg	0

=== Top half ===
==== Section 1 ====
Round of 32
(Kazakhstan) Alua Balkibekova	5
(Singapore) Wann Chee Wai Kei	0
(Vietnam) Nguyễn Thị Hương	0
(Russia) Iuliia Chumgalakova	5
(Kenya) Christine Ongare	RSC
(Tanzania) Rahma Maganga
(Turkey) Erivan Barut	4
(Guatemala) Aylin Jamez	1

Round of 16
(Kazakhstan) Alua Balkibekova	4
(Russia) Iuliia Chumgalakova	1
(Kenya) Christine Ongare
(Turkey) Erivan Barut	RSC

Quarterfinals
(Kazakhstan) Alua Balkibekova	5
(Turkey) Erivan Barut	0

==== Section 2 ====
Round of 32
(Venezuela) Tayonis Cedeño	5
(Armenia) Gayane Ter-Barseghyan	0
(Japan) Madoka Wada	5
(Chinese Taipei) Liu Chien-ling	0
(Tunisia) Wafa Hafsi	3
(Tajikistan) Sumaiya Kosimova	4
(South Korea) Kang Do-yeon
(India) Nitu Ghanghas	RSC

Round of 16
(Venezuela) Tayonis Cedeño	0
(Japan) Madoka Wada	5
(Tajikistan) Sumaiya Kosimova
(India) Nitu Ghanghas	RSC

Quarterfinals
(Japan) Madoka Wada
(India) Nitu Ghanghas	RSC

=== Bottom half ===
==== Section 3 ====
Round of 32
(Italy) Roberta Bonatti	0
(Uzbekistan) Farzona Fozilova	5
(Azerbaijan) Gunel Rahimova	0
(Serbia) Snežana Šiljković	5
(France) Rim Bennama	0
(Mongolia) Lutsaikhany Altantsetseg	5
(China) Hu Meiyi	5
(Algeria) Fatiha Mansouri	0

Round of 16
(Uzbekistan) Farzona Fozilova	5
(Serbia) Snežana Šiljković	0
(Mongolia) Lutsaikhany Altantsetseg	5
(China) Hu Meiyi	0

Quarterfinals
(Uzbekistan) Farzona Fozilova	0
(Mongolia) Lutsaikhany Altantsetseg	5

==== Section 4 ====
Round of 32
(Spain) Marta López	5
(Slovakia) Nicole Ďuríková	0
(Hungary) Lilla Szeleczki	0
(Morocco) Yasmine Moutaqui	5
(Sri Lanka) Nadeeka Ranasinghe	0
(Mexico) Alexa Gómez	5
(Nepal) Susma Tamang	3
(Bulgaria) Sevda Asenova	4

Round of 16
(Spain) Marta López	0
(Morocco) Yasmine Moutaqui	4
(Mexico) Alexa Gómez	0
(Bulgaria) Sevda Asenova	5

Quarterfinals
(Morocco) Yasmine Moutaqui	5
(Bulgaria) Sevda Asenova	0
