= Lutsaikhany Altantsetseg =

Mongolian boxer (born 1995)

Personal information
- Nationality: Mongolia
- Born: 12 July 1995 (age 30) Ulaanbaatar, Mongolia

Boxing career
Medal record
Women's amateur boxing
Representing Mongolia
World Championships
Bronze medal – third place	2025 Liverpool	48 kg
IBA World Championships
Silver medal – second place	2023 New Delhi	Minimumweight
Asian Championships
Bronze medal – third place	2021 Dubai	Flyweight
Bronze medal – third place	2022 Amman	Flyweight

Lutsaikhany Altantsetseg (Mongolian: Лутсайханы Алтанцэцэг; born 12 July 1995) is a Mongolian boxer who has competed in the mini flyweight and flyweight categories. She won a silver medal at the 2023 IBA Women's World Boxing Championships and bronze medal at the 2025 World Boxing Championships.

== Amateur career ==
In January 2020, Altantsetseg won the gold medal at the Mongolian championships in the flyweight category.

Altantsetseg reached the semifinals in the flyweight category at the 2021 Asian Amateur Boxing Championships in Dubai, where she was eliminated by Mary Kom, winning a bronze medal.

In 2022, Altantsetseg competed in the flyweight category of the World Championships. Later that year, she returned to the Asian Championships, winning another bronze medal.

Altantsetseg competed in the minimumweight category of the 2023 IBA Women's World Boxing Championships, where on 25 March 2023, in the gold medal match, she lost to Nitu Ghanghas by 5–0.

Altantsetseg competed in the 48 kg category of the 2025 World Boxing Championships held in Liverpool, England. She defeated Ayşe Çağırır in the round of 16 and Hikaru Shinohara in the quarterfinals, both by unanimous decision. In the semifinals, Altantsetseg lost to Minakshi Hooda, winning a bronze medal.
