= 2019 AIBA Women's World Boxing Championships – Flyweight =

Flyweight at the 2019 AIBA Women's World Boxing Championships
- Venue: FSK Sports Complex
- Location: Ulan-Ude, Russia
- Dates: 3–13 October
- Competitors: 29 from 29 nations

Medalists
gold medal	Liliya Aetbaeva	Russia
silver medal	Buse Naz Çakıroğlu	Turkey
bronze medal	Pang Chol-mi	North Korea
bronze medal	Mary Kom	India

The flyweight competition at the 2019 AIBA Women's World Boxing Championships was held from 3 to 13 October 2019.

== Schedule ==
The schedule was as follows:

Date	Time	Round
Thursday 3 October 2019	18:30	Round of 32
Tuesday 8 October 2019	13:00; 18:00	Round of 16
Thursday 10 October 2019	13:00	Quarterfinals
Saturday 12 October 2019	13:00	Semifinals
Sunday 13 October 2019	After 16:00	Final

All times are Irkutsk Time (UTC+8)

== Results ==
=== Final ===
Semi-finals
(North Korea) Pang Chol-mi	1
(Russia) Liliya Aetbaeva	4
(India) Mary Kom	1
(Turkey) Buse Naz Çakıroğlu	4

Final
(Russia) Liliya Aetbaeva	4
(Turkey) Buse Naz Çakıroğlu	1

=== Top half ===
==== Section 1 ====
Round of 32
(Australia) Taylah Robertson	0
(Republic of Ireland) Ceire Smith	5
(Serbia) Nina Radovanović	5
(Burundi) Ornella Havyarimana	0
(Kazakhstan) Nazym Kyzaibay	1
(Japan) Tsukimi Namiki	4

Round of 16
(North Korea) Pang Chol-mi	3
(Republic of Ireland) Ceire Smith	2
(Serbia) Nina Radovanović	0
(Japan) Tsukimi Namiki	5

Quarterfinals
(North Korea) Pang Chol-mi	5
(Japan) Tsukimi Namiki	0

==== Section 2 ====
Round of 32
(Algeria) Roumaysa Boualam	1
(Russia) Liliya Aetbaeva	4
(Brazil) Graziele de Sousa	5
(Switzerland) Eliana Pileggi	0
(Mongolia) Lutsaikhany Altantsetseg	3
(Italy) Camilla Fadda	2
(Poland) Natalia Rok	1
(Vietnam) Nguyễn Thị Tâm	4

Round of 16
(Russia) Liliya Aetbaeva	4
(Brazil) Graziele de Sousa	1
(Mongolia) Lutsaikhany Altantsetseg	0
(Vietnam) Nguyễn Thị Tâm	5

Quarterfinals
(Russia) Liliya Aetbaeva	3
(Vietnam) Nguyễn Thị Tâm	2 (Note: The original decision was 3:2 in favour of Nguyễn Thị Tâm. Upon appeal by the Russian Boxing Federation, a bout review jury reviewed result and overturned said decision.)

=== Bottom half ===
==== Section 3 ====
Round of 32
(Germany) Azize Nimani	1
(Thailand) Jutamas Jitpong	4
(Belarus) Volha Lushchyk	0
(Colombia) Ingrit Valencia	5
(England) Tori-Ellis Willetts	0
(Bulgaria) Gabriela Dimitrova	5

Round of 16
(India) Mary Kom	5
(Thailand) Jutamas Jitpong	0
(Colombia) Ingrit Valencia	5
(Bulgaria) Gabriela Dimitrova	0

Quarterfinals
(India) Mary Kom	5
(Colombia) Ingrit Valencia	0

==== Section 4 ====
Round of 32
(Morocco) Yasmine Mouttaki	0
(Uzbekistan) Tursunoy Rakhimova	5
(Philippines) Irish Magno	1
(China) Cai Zongju	4
(Armenia) Anush Grigoryan	3
(United States) Heaven Garcia	2

Round of 16
(Uzbekistan) Tursunoy Rakhimova	1
(China) Cai Zongju	4
(Armenia) Anush Grigoryan	0
(Turkey) Buse Naz Çakıroğlu	5

Quarterfinals
(China) Cai Zongju	2
(Turkey) Buse Naz Çakıroğlu	3
