= 2019 AIBA Women's World Boxing Championships – Light flyweight =

Light flyweight at the 2019 AIBA Women's World Boxing Championships
- Venue: FSK Sports Complex
- Location: Ulan-Ude, Russia
- Dates: 3–13 October
- Competitors: 20 from 20 nations

Medalists
gold medal	Ekaterina Paltceva	Russia
silver medal	Manju Rani	India
bronze medal	Demie-Jade Resztan	England
bronze medal	Chuthamat Raksat	Thailand

The light flyweight competition at the 2019 AIBA Women's World Boxing Championships was held from 3 to 13 October 2019.

== Schedule ==
The schedule was as follows:

Date	Time	Round
Thursday 3 October 2019	18:00	Round of 32
Monday 7 October 2019	18:00	Round of 16
Thursday 10 October 2019	18:00	Quarterfinals
Saturday 12 October 2019	18:00	Semifinals
Sunday 13 October 2019	16:00	Final

All times are Irkutsk Time (UTC+8)

== Results ==
=== Final ===
Semi-finals
(India) Manju Rani	4
(Thailand) Chuthamat Raksat	1
(England) Demie-Jade Resztan	1
(Russia) Ekaterina Paltceva	4

Final
(India) Manju Rani	1
(Russia) Ekaterina Paltceva	4

=== Top half ===
==== Section 1 ====
Round of 32
(Japan) Risa Nakata	RSC
(Botswana) Lethabo Modukanele

Round of 16
(North Korea) Kim Hyang-mi	5
(Japan) Risa Nakata	0
(Venezuela) Tayonis Cedeño	0
(India) Manju Rani	5

Quarterfinals
(North Korea) Kim Hyang-mi	1
(India) Manju Rani	4

==== Section 2 ====
Round of 32
(Australia) Kaila Riley	0
(Thailand) Chuthamat Raksat	5

Round of 16
(Bulgaria) Sevda Asenova	5
(Algeria) Fatiha Mansouri	0
(Thailand) Chuthamat Raksat	3
(Chinese Taipei) Pin Meng-chieh	2

Quarterfinals
(Bulgaria) Sevda Asenova	0
(Thailand) Chuthamat Raksat	5

=== Bottom half ===
==== Section 3 ====
Round of 32
(Kazakhstan) Alua Balkibekova	2
(Uzbekistan) Gulasal Sultonalieva	3

Round of 16
(England) Demie-Jade Resztan	4
(Uzbekistan) Gulasal Sultonalieva	0
(Germany) Annemarie Stark	0
(Italy) Roberta Bonatti	5

Quarterfinals
(England) Demie-Jade Resztan	3
(Italy) Roberta Bonatti	2

==== Section 4 ====
Round of 32
(Indonesia) Endang	2
(United States) Breeanna Locquiao	3

Round of 16
(Mongolia) Balsangiin Möngönsaran	1
(Morocco) Rabab Cheddar	4
(United States) Breeanna Locquiao	1
(Russia) Ekaterina Paltceva	4

Quarterfinals
(Morocco) Rabab Cheddar	0
(Russia) Ekaterina Paltceva	5
