= Boxing at the 2015 European Games – Qualification =

Boxing competitions

Qualification for the boxing events at the 2015 European Games will begin in June 2014. Nations are limited to one entry per weight division. Azerbaijan will have host nation positions available in each weight category.

== Qualification rules ==
=== Men's ===
NOC's will be awarded quota places by EUBC and AIBA based on historical data of previous European Championships.

=== Women's ===
In the women's events, the EUBC European Women’s Boxing Championships in Bucharest, Romania will be the official qualification event after which the European ranking will be established by 30 June 2014. If an NOC has more than one athlete in the top 14, the next best ranked NOC will received the allocation. 2 other place per weight category are reserved for 'universality' and host nominations. Moreover, the top five European athletes in the 75 kg class at the 2014 AIBA Women's World Boxing Championships in South Korea will earn a quota place.

== Qualification timeline ==
Event	Dates	Location
Women's European Championships	31 May – 7 June 2014	(Romania) Bucharest
Women's World Championships	13–25 November 2014	(South Korea) Jeju City

== Qualification summary ==
NOC	Men										Women					Total
NOC	49	52	56	60	64	69	75	81	91	+91	51	54	60	64	75	Total
Albania			X			X										2
Armenia	X	X	X	X	X			X								6
Austria									X							1
Azerbaijan	X	X	X	X	X	X	X	X	X	X	X	X	X	X	X	15
Belarus		X	X	X	X	X	X	X	X	X	X				X	11
Belgium		X				X										2
Bosnia and Herzegovina					X		X	X	X							4
Bulgaria	X	X	X	X	X	X		X	X	X	X	X	X			12
Croatia				X			X		X	X						4
Czech Republic							X		X	X				X		4
Denmark			X				X		X					X		4
Estonia						X		X	X							3
Finland			X				X					X	X			4
France		X	X	X	X	X	X	X	X	X	X	X	X			12
Georgia		X	X	X	X	X	X	X	X	X						9
Germany	X	X	X	X	X	X	X	X	X	X	X	X	X	X	X	15
Great Britain	X	X	X	X	X	X	X	X		X	X			X	X	12
Greece				X				X								2
Hungary	X	X	X	X	X	X	X	X	X	X	X		X	X	X	14
Ireland	X	X	X	X	X	X	X		X	X	X	X	X			12
Israel	X			X			X			X						4
Italy		X	X	X	X	X	X	X		X	X	X	X	X	X	13
Kosovo					X			X								2
Latvia				X	X	X		X	X							5
Lithuania				X			X		X	X						4
Moldova		X	X	X	X	X	X	X	X	X		X	X			11
Montenegro							X	X								2
Netherlands								X							X	2
Norway					X						X					2
Poland		X	X	X	X	X	X	X			X	X		X	X	11
Romania			X		X	X		X	X	X	X		X	X	X	10
Russia	X	X	X	X	X	X	X	X	X	X	X	X	X	X	X	15
Serbia							X						X			2
Slovakia		X		X				X	X							4
Slovenia					X		X	X								3
Spain		X	X		X	X		X					X			6
Sweden					X		X		X				X	X	X	6
Switzerland								X					X	X		3
Turkey	X	X	X	X	X	X		X	X	X	X	X	X		X	13
Ukraine	X	X	X	X	X	X	X	X	X	X	X				X	12
40 NOCs	11	19	21	22	24	21	24	27	23	19	15	11	16	12	13	278
