= Manju Rani =

Manju Rani may refer to:

- Manju Rani (boxer)
- Manju Rani (athlete)
