= 2025 IBA Women's World Boxing Championships – Light flyweight =

Light flyweight at the 2025 IBA Women's World Boxing Championships
- Venue: Sportski centar Čair
- Location: Niš, Serbia
- Dates: 9–14 March (preliminaries/semifinals); 16 March (final)
- Competitors: 23 from 23 nations

Medalists
gold medal	Alua Balkibekova	Kazakhstan
silver medal	Hu Meiyi	China
bronze medal	Sabina Bobokulova	Uzbekistan
bronze medal	An Kum-byol	North Korea

The Light flyweight competition at the 2025 IBA Women's World Boxing Championships was held from 9 to 16 March 2025.

== Results ==
=== Finals ===
Semi-finals
(China) Hu Meiyi	4
(Uzbekistan) Sabina Bobokulova	0
(North Korea) An Kum-byol	0
(Kazakhstan) Alua Balkibekova	5

Final
(China) Hu Meiyi	0
(Kazakhstan) Alua Balkibekova	5

=== Top half ===
==== Section 1 ====
Round of 32
(Mexico) Fátima Herrera	5
(Serbia) Sanja Mitić	0

Round of 16
(Thailand) Chuthamat Raksat	4
(Mexico) Fátima Herrera	3
(Republic of Ireland) Daina Moorehouse	1
(China) Hu Meiyi	4

Quarterfinals
(Thailand) Chuthamat Raksat	3
(China) Hu Meiyi	4

==== Section 2 ====
Round of 32
(Azerbaijan) Marjona Savriyeva	RSC-I
(Romania) Mihaela Bădescu
(Colombia) Yerlin Quiñionez	RSC
(Georgia (country)) Teona Pirosmanashvili

Round of 16
(Bulgaria) Zlatislava Chukanova	5
(Azerbaijan) Marjona Savriyeva	0
(Colombia) Yerlin Quiñionez	0
(Uzbekistan) Sabina Bobokulova	5

Quarterfinals
(Bulgaria) Zlatislava Chukanova	2
(Uzbekistan) Sabina Bobokulova	5

=== Bottom half ===
==== Section 3 ====
Round of 32
(South Africa) Ntandoyenkosi Ncube
(Russia) Rinata Bezel	w/o
(North Korea) An Kum-byol	5
(Venezuela) Alondra Brito	2

Round of 16
(Spain) Laura Fuertes	4
(Russia) Rinata Bezel	1
(North Korea) An Kum-byol	5
(Armenia) Anush Grigoryan	0

Quarterfinals
(Spain) Laura Fuertes	1
(North Korea) An Kum-byol	4

==== Section 4 ====
Round of 32
(Ethiopia) Wakjira Wada
(Turkey) Ayşen Taşkın	RSC
(Kazakhstan) Alua Balkibekova	5
(Kenya) Veronica Nziva	0

Round of 16
(Vietnam) Nguyễn Thị Thu Nhi	0
(Turkey) Ayşen Taşkın	5
(Kazakhstan) Alua Balkibekova	5
(Morocco) Yasmine Moutaqui	0

Quarterfinals
(Turkey) Ayşen Taşkın	0
(Kazakhstan) Alua Balkibekova	5
