= 2022 IBA Women's World Boxing Championships – Light welterweight =

Light welterweight at the 2022 IBA Women's World Boxing Championships
- Venue: Başakşehir Youth and Sports Facility
- Location: Istanbul, Turkey
- Dates: 9–19 May
- Competitors: 26 from 26 nations

Medalists
gold medal	Amy Broadhurst	Ireland
silver medal	Imane Khelif	Algeria
bronze medal	Parveen Hooda	India
bronze medal	Chelsey Heijnen	Netherlands

The Light welterweight competition at the 2022 IBA Women's World Boxing Championships was held from 9 to 19 May 2022.

== Results ==
=== Finals ===
Semi-finals
(Republic of Ireland) Amy Broadhurst	4
(India) Parveen Hooda	1
(Algeria) Imane Khelif	5
(Netherlands) Chelsey Heijnen	0

Final
(Republic of Ireland) Amy Broadhurst	5
(Algeria) Imane Khelif	0

=== Top half ===
==== Section 1 ====
Round of 32
(Argentina) Viviana Palavecino	3
(Japan) Mai Kito	2
(Croatia) Sara Beram	0
(Republic of Ireland) Amy Broadhurst	5
(Egypt) Rahma Mohamed	0
(Bulgaria) Aslahan Mehmedova	5

Round of 16
(Serbia) Jelena Janićijević	RSC-I
(Argentina) Viviana Palavecino
(Republic of Ireland) Amy Broadhurst	5
(Bulgaria) Aslahan Mehmedova	0

Quarterfinals
(Serbia) Jelena Janićijević	0
(Republic of Ireland) Amy Broadhurst	5

==== Section 2 ====
Round of 32
(Tajikistan) Shoira Zulkaynarova	5
(Kuwait) Noura Al-Mutairi	0
(Ukraine) Mariia Bova	0
(India) Parveen Hooda	5

Round of 16
(South Korea) Jeong Hea-dung	0
(Tajikistan) Shoira Zulkaynarova	3
(India) Parveen Hooda	5
(United States) Jajaira Gonzalez	0

Quarterfinals
(Tajikistan) Shoira Zulkaynarova	0
(India) Parveen Hooda	5

=== Bottom half ===
==== Section 3 ====
Round of 32
(Kazakhstan) Aida Abikeyeva	0
(Algeria) Imane Khelif	5
(Mongolia) Uranbilegiin Shinetsetseg	0
(Turkey) Gizem Özer	5

Round of 16
(Latvia) Beatrise Rozentāle
(Algeria) Imane Khelif	RSC
(Turkey) Gizem Özer	0
(Greece) Olga Papadatou	5

Quarterfinals
(Algeria) Imane Khelif	5
(Greece) Olga Papadatou	0

==== Section 4 ====
Round of 32
(Italy) Assunta Canfora	5
(Kenya) Teresia Wanjiru	0
(Venezuela) Omailyn Alcalá	5
(South Africa) Pamela Mayoli	0
(Bolivia) María Ortega
(Netherlands) Chelsey Heijnen	RSC

Round of 16
(Italy) Assunta Canfora	3
(Venezuela) Omailyn Alcalá	2
(Netherlands) Chelsey Heijnen	RSC
(Senegal) Mariatou Diallo

Quarterfinals
(Italy) Assunta Canfora	2
(Netherlands) Chelsey Heijnen	3
