= Buse Naz Çakıroğlu =

Turkish boxer (born 1996)

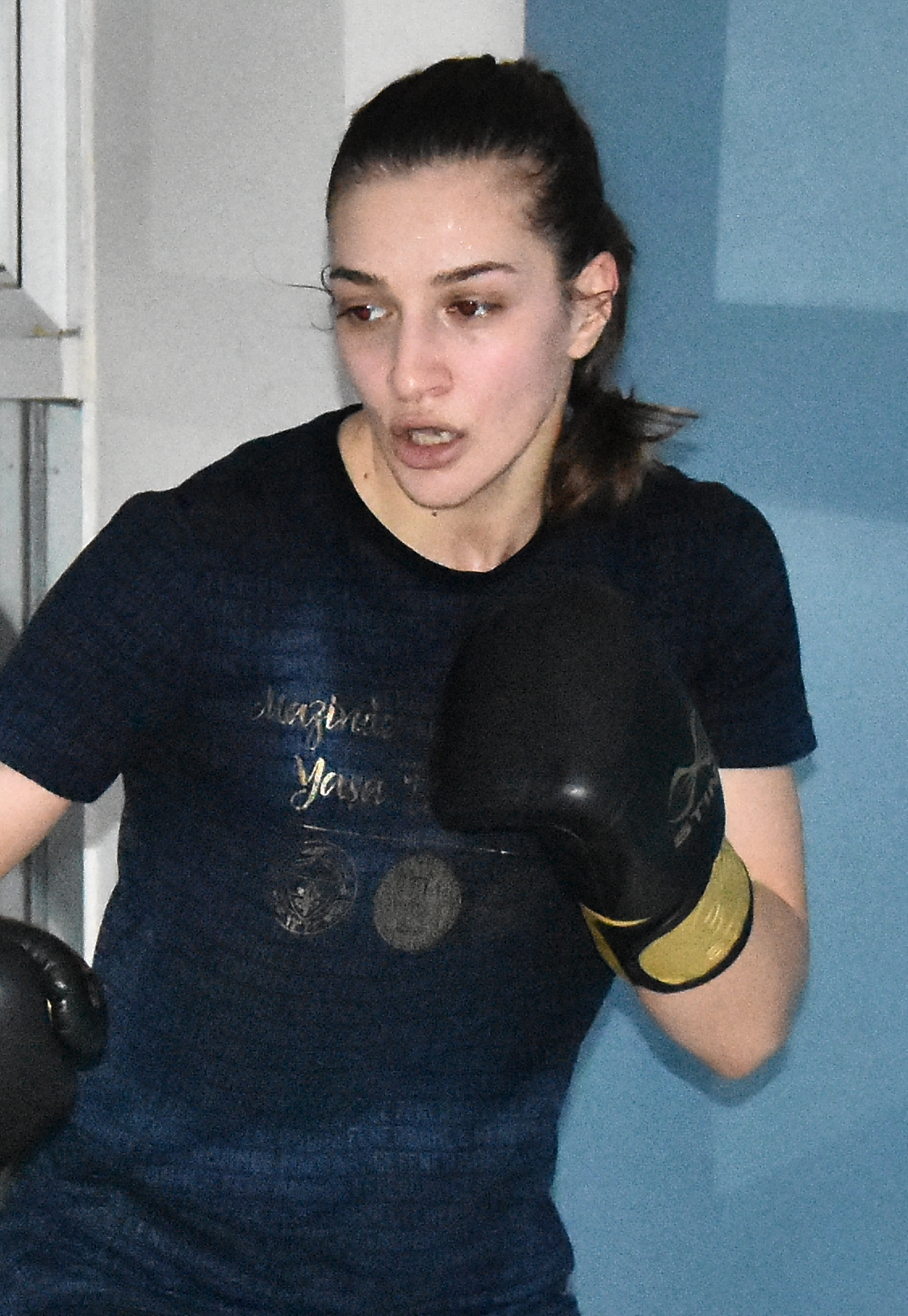
- Çakıroğlu in 2020

Personal information
- Nationality: Turkish
- Born: 26 May 1996 (age 30) Trabzon, Turkey
- Education: Düzce University
- Height: 1.64 m (5 ft 5 in)
- Weight: 52 kg (115 lb)

Boxing career
- Weight class: Flyweight

Boxing record
- Total fights: 86
- Wins: 74
- Win by KO: 2
- Losses: 12
- Draws: 0
- No contests: 0
Medal record
Women's amateur boxing
Representing Turkey
Olympic Games
Silver medal – second place	2020 Tokyo	Flyweight
Silver medal – second place	2024 Paris	Flyweight
IBA World Championships
Gold medal – first place	2022 Istanbul	Light flyweight
Silver medal – second place	2019 Ulan-Ude	Flyweight
Silver medal – second place	2025 Niš	Flyweight
WB World Championships
Silver medal – second place	2025 Liverpool	51 kg
European Games
Gold medal – first place	2019 Minsk	Flyweight
Gold medal – first place	2023 Kraków	Light flyweight
EUBC European Championships
Gold medal – first place	2019 Alcobendas	Flyweight
Gold medal – first place	2022 Budva	Light flyweight
Gold medal – first place	2024 Belgrade	Flyweight
Silver medal – second place	2018 Sofia	Flyweight
European Union Championships
Gold medal – first place	2017 Cascia	Flyweight
Mediterranean Games
Bronze medal – third place	2022 Oran	Light flyweight

Buse Naz Çakıroğlu (born 26 May 1996) is a female Turkish, World and European champion and Olympic finalist boxer. She is a Fenerbahçe S.K. athlete.

== Personal life ==
Çakıroğlu was born in Trabzon, Turkey on 26 May 1996. She studied Physical Education and Sport in Düzce University.

== Boxing career ==
The 1.64 m (5 ft 4 1/2 in) female boxer at 51 kg (112 lb) is a member of Fenerbahçe Boxing.

Çakıroğlu became champion at the 2017 Women's European Union Amateur Boxing Championships held in Cascia, Italy.

She took the silver medal at the 2018 Women's European Amateur Boxing Championships in Sofia, Bulgaria.

In 2019, she won the gold medal in the flyweight event at the European Games in Minsk, Belarus, another gold medal at the Women's European Amateur Boxing Championships in Alcobendas, Spain, and the silver medal at the AIBA Women's World Boxing Championships in Ulan-Ude, Russia.

She won the silver medal in the flyweight event at the 2020 Summer Olympics.

She won one of the bronze medals in the light flyweight event at the 2022 Mediterranean Games held in Oran, Algeria. Buse Naz Çakıroğlu won a gold medal at the 2022 Women's European Amateur Boxing Championships. Çakıroğlu beat her Irish opponent Caitlin Fryers 5–0 in the 50 kg final in the competition held in Montenegro's Budva.

She won the gold medal in the women's light flyweight at the 3rd European Games held at Nowy Targ Arena in Nowy Targ, Poland, beating Armenian Anush Grigoryan in the second round, Polish Natalia Rok in the quarterfinals, Italian Giordana Sorrentino in the semifinals and French Wassila Lkhadiri in the final with 5-0 scores. She won a quota for the 2024 Summer Olympics.

She became the European champion for the third time by defeating Russian boxer Anastasiia Kool 5-0 in the 52 kg final match of the 2024 European Amateur Boxing Championships held in Belgrade, Serbia and winning the gold medal. She reached the final by defeating her Spanish rival Marta Lopez Del Abbol in the quarter-finals and Bulgarian athlete Venelina Poptoleva 5-0 in the semifinals. She won the silver medal at the Women's Senior World Championship held in Serbia in 2025.

She won the silver medal at the flyweight, losing 4-1 to her Chinese rival Wu Yu in the final match of the 2024 Paris Olympics held at Arena Paris Nord in Paris, France. After bye in the first round, she defeated Mexican Fátima Herrera in the last 16 round, Finnish Pihla Kaivo-oja in the quarterfinals, and Filipino Aira Aira Villegas in the semifinals with 5-0 scores to reach the final.

She reached the final of the 2025 IBA Women's World Boxing Championships 52 kg held in Niš, Serbia, after bye in the first round, defeating Chinese Wei Sitong 5-0 in the last 16 round, Mongolian Chinabatyn Ariunzul in the quarterfinals and Serbian Dragana Jovanović in the semifinals with RSC. She lost to her North Korean opponent Pang Chol-mi 5-0 in the final and won the silver medal.

== See also ==
- Busenaz Sürmeneli
