= 2021 World Military Boxing Championship =

- Venue: CSKA "Igrovoy" SC, VTB Arena
- Location: Moscow, Russia
- Dates: 16 – 26 September
- Competitors: 228 (183 men, 45 women) from 36 nations

The 2021 World Military Boxing Championship was the 58th edition of the World Military Boxing Championships. It was hosted by the CISM and BFR held in Moscow (Russia) on September 16-26, 2021.

The championship was the first boxing competition organised by the International Military Sports Council after the COVID-19 pandemic.

The 58th championship was inaugurated by Secretary of State — Deputy Minister of Defence of Russia, Nikolai Pankov, who presented the greetings from the head of the Military Department, General Sergei Shoigu, the Defence Minister of Russian Federation.

The competition took place in ten weight categories for men and five for women. 228 boxers (183 men, 45 women) from 36 countries competed in the tournament with a total of 216 fights.

== Medal summary ==
=== Medalists – Men ===
Event	Gold	Silver	Bronze
-49 kg	Temirtas Zhussupov; Kazakhstan	Leanderson Conceicao; Brazil	Volodya Mnatsakanyan; Russia
-49 kg	Temirtas Zhussupov; Kazakhstan	Leanderson Conceicao; Brazil	Sajeewa Nuwan Kumara; Sri Lanka
-52 kg	Dmitry Dvali; Russia	Damir Abdykadyr; Kazakhstan	Kharkhüügiin Enkhmandakh; Mongolia
-52 kg	Dmitry Dvali; Russia	Damir Abdykadyr; Kazakhstan	Sean Mari; Ireland
-56 kg	Óvik Ogannisián; Russia	Kharkhüügiin Enkh-Amar; Mongolia	Rustem Shaumenov; Kazakhstan
-56 kg	Óvik Ogannisián; Russia	Kharkhüügiin Enkh-Amar; Mongolia	Oussama Mordjane; Algeria
-60 kg	Shunkor Abdurasulov; Uzbekistan	Konstantin Opolsky; Russia	Abdelnacer Benlaribi; Algeria
-60 kg	Shunkor Abdurasulov; Uzbekistan	Konstantin Opolsky; Russia	Tayfur Aliyev; Azerbaijan
-64 kg	Dzmitry Asanau; Belarus	Mujibillo Tursunov; Uzbekistan	Wanderson de Oliveira; Brazil
-64 kg	Dzmitry Asanau; Belarus	Mujibillo Tursunov; Uzbekistan	Aitzhan Ashirkhan; Kazakhstan
-69 kg	Ivan Stupin; Russia	Christiann Palacio; Venezuela	Waheed Abdul-Ridha; Iraq
-69 kg	Ivan Stupin; Russia	Christiann Palacio; Venezuela	Armen Mashakaryan; Armenia
-75 kg	Timur Nurseitov; Kazakhstan	Alexey Semykin; Russia	Moreno Fendero; France
-75 kg	Timur Nurseitov; Kazakhstan	Alexey Semykin; Russia	Park Jin-hun; South Korea
-81 kg	Radzhab Radzhabov; Russia	Mohamed Houmri; Algeria	Bilawal Zia; Pakistan
-81 kg	Radzhab Radzhabov; Russia	Mohamed Houmri; Algeria	Vincenzo Lizzi; Italy
-91 kg	Abzal Kuttybekov; Kazakhstan	Ivan Sagaidak; Russia	Soheb Bouafia; France
-91 kg	Abzal Kuttybekov; Kazakhstan	Ivan Sagaidak; Russia	Alaa Eldin Ghossoun; Syria
+91 kg	Lazizbek Mullojonov; Uzbekistan	Svetoslav Teterin; Russia	Davit Chaloyan; Armenia
+91 kg	Lazizbek Mullojonov; Uzbekistan	Svetoslav Teterin; Russia	Iman Ramezanpour; Iran

=== Medalists – Women ===
Event	Gold	Silver	Bronze
-51 kg	Ekaterina Paltceva; Russia	Giordana Sorrentino; Italy	Aziza Yokubova; Uzbekistan
-51 kg	Ekaterina Paltceva; Russia	Giordana Sorrentino; Italy	Sandra Drabik; Poland
-57 kg	Daria Abramova; Russia	Tömörkhuyagiin Bolortuul; Mongolia	Jucielen Romeu; Brazil
-57 kg	Daria Abramova; Russia	Tömörkhuyagiin Bolortuul; Mongolia	Helina Bruyevich; Belarus
-60 kg	Beatriz Ferreira; Brazil	Crisandi Rios; Venezuela	Raykhona Kodirova; Uzbekistan
-60 kg	Beatriz Ferreira; Brazil	Crisandi Rios; Venezuela	Lorye Ruyer; France
-69 kg	Saadat Dalgatova; Russia	Barbara Maria dos Santos; Brazil	Zhasmin Kizatova; Kazakhstan
-69 kg	Saadat Dalgatova; Russia	Barbara Maria dos Santos; Brazil	Navbakhor Khamidova; Uzbekistan
-75 kg	Mavluda Mavlonova; Uzbekistan	Viktoria Kebikava; Belarus	Agata Kaczmarska; Poland
-75 kg	Mavluda Mavlonova; Uzbekistan	Viktoria Kebikava; Belarus	Gayani Nisansala Kaluarachchilage; Sri Lanka

=== Medal table ===
* Host nation (Russia)

Rank	Nation	Gold	Silver	Bronze	Total
1	Russia (RUS)*	7	4	1	12
2	Kazakhstan (KAZ)	3	1	3	7
2	Uzbekistan (UZB)	3	1	3	7
4	Brazil (BRA)	1	2	2	5
5	Belarus (BLR)	1	1	1	3
6	Mongolia (MNG)	0	2	1	3
7	Venezuela (VEN)	0	2	0	2
8	Algeria (DZA)	0	1	2	3
9	Italy (ITA)	0	1	1	2
10	France (FRA)	0	0	3	3
11	Armenia (ARM)	0	0	2	2
11	Poland (POL)	0	0	2	2
11	Sri Lanka (SRI)	0	0	2	2
14	Azerbaijan (AZE)	0	0	1	1
14	Iran (IRN)	0	0	1	1
14	Iraq (IRQ)	0	0	1	1
14	Ireland (IRL)	0	0	1	1
14	Pakistan (PAK)	0	0	1	1
14	South Korea (KOR)	0	0	1	1
14	Syria (SYR)	0	0	1	1
Totals (20 entries)		15	15	30	60

== See also ==
- World Military Championships
