= Svetlana Soluianova =

Russian boxer (born 1994)

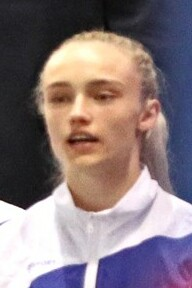

Personal information
- Full name: Svetlana Yurievna Soluianova
- Nationality: Russian
- Born: 21 September 1994 (age 31) Dimitrovgrad, Ulyanovsk Oblast, Russia

Sport
- Sport: Boxing
Medal record
Women's amateur boxing
Representing Russia
European Games
Silver medal – second place	2019 Minsk	Flyweight
European Championships
Gold medal – first place	2018 Sofia	Flyweight

Svetlana Yurievna Soluianova (Russian: Светлана Юрьевна Солуянова; born 21 September 1994) is a Russian boxer. She competed in the women's flyweight event at the 2020 Summer Olympics.

In 2018 she became the European Champion in the weight class up to 51 kg.

== Early life and training ==
Soluianova began boxing at the age of 13. Until the 9th grade, she also studied at a music school, specializing in accordion, but after graduation chose to focus on boxing.

She joined the Russian national team in 2011. Competing in her weight division, Soluianova has advantages in height (175 cm) and reach, allowing her to effectively fight at long range in an out-fighter style.

== Amateur career ==
=== 2012 Russian Boxing Championships ===
At age 18, Soluianova won her first national title at the 2012 Russian Championships in Orenburg (15–21 October). In the final, she defeated Viktoria Kuleshova, bronze medalist of the previous year’s championships.

- Round of 16: defeated Marina Khubulova — 16:4
- Quarterfinal: defeated Inna Lots — 16:11
- Semifinal: defeated Ulyana Koshkarova — 15:6
- Final: defeated Viktoria Kuleshova — 14:11

=== 2012 EUBC European Youth Championships ===
Following her national success, Soluianova won the European Youth Championships in Władysławowo, Poland, defeating a Turkish opponent in the final 12:8. She was recognized as the best athlete of the tournament and awarded a special trophy.

=== 2016 World University Championships ===
At the World University Championships in Chiang Mai, Thailand (3–8 October 2016), she won a bronze medal, losing in the semifinal to a Thai boxer (1:2).

=== 2017 Silesian Women’s Boxing Championships ===
In Gliwice, Poland (5–9 September 2017), Soluianova won gold, defeating four-time Kazakhstan champion and two-time world champion Nazym Kyzaibay 5:0 in the final.

=== 2018 Russian Championships ===
At the Russian Championships in Ulan-Ude (19–25 March 2018), she won gold, defeating World Champion and four-time Russian Champion Alexandra Kuleshova in the final.

=== 2018 European Championships ===
At the 11th Women’s European Boxing Championships in Sofia, Bulgaria (5–12 June 2018), Soluianova claimed the gold medal, defeating Turkey’s Buse Naz Çakıroğlu in the final.

- Round of 32: defeated Nina Radovanović (Serbia) — 4:1
- Round of 16: defeated Tetyana Kob (Ukraine), 10-time national champion and 2009 European Champion — 5:0
- Quarterfinal: defeated Veronika Losvik (Norway) — 5:0
- Semifinal: defeated Gabriela Dimitrova (Bulgaria) — 4:1
- Final: defeated Buse Naz Çakıroğlu (Turkey) — 3:2

=== 2018 World Championships ===
At the 10th AIBA Women’s World Championships in India, Soluianova was eliminated in the first round (15 November 2018), losing to Zhaina Shekerbekova of Kazakhstan.

=== 2019 European Games ===
At the 2019 European Games in Minsk, she won the silver medal.

On 19 July 2019, Soluianova was named an ambassador of the 1st World Martial Arts Festival TAFISA.

=== 2020 Summer Olympics ===
In June 2021, she qualified for the 2020 Summer Olympics. In July 2021, she competed in Tokyo, but was eliminated in the Round of 32, losing 2:3 to Virginia Fuchs of the United States.
