= 2019 Women's European Amateur Boxing Championships =

2019 Women's European Boxing Championships
- Host city: Alcobendas
- Country: Spain
- Dates: 24–31 August
- Main venue: Pabellón Amaya Valdemoro

The 2019 Women’s European Boxing Championships was hosted and organized by the Spanish Boxing Federation in Pabellón Amaya Valdemoro, Alcobendas, Spain in 2019. The event was held from 24 to 31 August 2019. The tournament was organized in association with the European Boxing Confederation (EUBC).

== Medal table ==
* Host nation (Spain)

Rank	Nation	Gold	Silver	Bronze	Total
1	Russia	3	2	3	8
2	Italy	2	1	2	5
3	Turkey	2	0	2	4
4	Ireland	1	0	1	2
5	Finland	1	0	0	1
5	Romania	1	0	0	1
7	Poland	0	2	1	3
8	England	0	2	0	2
9	Ukraine	0	1	4	5
10	France	0	1	2	3
11	Belarus	0	1	1	2
12	Bulgaria	0	0	1	1
12	Czech Republic	0	0	1	1
12	Sweden	0	0	1	1
12	Wales	0	0	1	1
Totals (15 entries)		10	10	20	40

== Medal winners ==
Event	Gold	Silver	Bronze
Light flyweight (48 kg)	Iuliia Chumgalakova; Russia	Demie-Jade Resztan; England	Roberta Bonatti; Italy
Light flyweight (48 kg)	Iuliia Chumgalakova; Russia	Demie-Jade Resztan; England	Hanna Okhota; Ukraine
Flyweight (51 kg)	Buse Naz Çakıroğlu; Turkey	Elena Savelyeva; Russia	Tetyana Kob; Ukraine
Flyweight (51 kg)	Buse Naz Çakıroğlu; Turkey	Elena Savelyeva; Russia	Wassila Lkhadiri; France
Bantamweight (54 kg)	Lăcrămioara Perijoc; Romania	Karina Tazabekova; Russia	Caroline Cruveillier; France
Bantamweight (54 kg)	Lăcrămioara Perijoc; Romania	Karina Tazabekova; Russia	Yuliya Apanasovich; Belarus
Featherweight (57 kg)	Irma Testa; Italy	Karriss Artingstall; England	Sandra Kruk; Poland
Featherweight (57 kg)	Irma Testa; Italy	Karriss Artingstall; England	Stanimira Petrova; Bulgaria
Lightweight (60 kg)	Mira Potkonen; Finland	Maïva Hamadouche; France	Amy Broadhurst; Ireland
Lightweight (60 kg)	Mira Potkonen; Finland	Maïva Hamadouche; France	Sema Çalışkan; Turkey
Light welterweight (64 kg)	Francesca Amato; Italy	Aneta Rygielska; Poland	Ornella Kheteeva; Russia
Light welterweight (64 kg)	Francesca Amato; Italy	Aneta Rygielska; Poland	Mariia Bova; Ukraine
Welterweight (69 kg)	Darima Sandakova; Russia	Angela Carini; Italy	Busenaz Sürmeneli; Turkey
Welterweight (69 kg)	Darima Sandakova; Russia	Angela Carini; Italy	Rosie Eccles; Wales
Middleweight (75 kg)	Aoife O'Rourke; Ireland	Elżbieta Wójcik; Poland	Anastasiia Shamonova; Russia
Middleweight (75 kg)	Aoife O'Rourke; Ireland	Elżbieta Wójcik; Poland	Love Holgersson; Sweden
Light heavyweight (81 kg)	Elif Güneri; Turkey	Viktoria Kebikava; Belarus	Anastasiia Chernokolenko; Ukraine
Light heavyweight (81 kg)	Elif Güneri; Turkey	Viktoria Kebikava; Belarus	Anna Ivanova; Russia
Heavyweight (+81 kg)	Zenfira Magomedalieva; Russia	Tetiana Shevchenko; Ukraine	Flavia Severin; Italy
Heavyweight (+81 kg)	Zenfira Magomedalieva; Russia	Tetiana Shevchenko; Ukraine	Vendula Kučerová; Czech Republic

== Participating nations ==
136 boxers from 31 nations competed.

- Armenia (3)
- Belarus (9)
- Bulgaria (6)
- Croatia (3)
- Czech Republic (4)
- Denmark (2)
- England (6)
- Finland (1)
- France (8)
- Georgia (1)
- Hungary (9)
- Ireland (4)
- Italy (8)
- Latvia (1)
- Lithuania (2)
- Malta (1)
- Moldova (1)
- Netherlands (2)
- Norway (2)
- Poland (8)
- Romania (7)
- Russia (10)
- Scotland (1)
- Serbia (5)
- Slovenia (2)
- Spain (6)
- Sweden (2)
- Switzerland (3)
- Turkey (8)
- Ukraine (10)
- Wales (1)
