= Alua Balkibekova =

Kazakh boxer (born 1996)

Personal information
- Nationality: Kazakhstani
- Born: 24 February 1996 (age 30)
- Height: 165 cm (5 ft 5 in)

Boxing career
Medal record
Women's amateur boxing
Representing Kazakhstan
World Championships
Gold medal – first place	2025 Liverpool	51 kg
IBA World Championships
Gold medal – first place	2025 Niš	Light flyweight
Silver medal – second place	2022 Istanbul	Minimumweight
Bronze medal – third place	2023 New Delhi	Minimumweight
Asian Championships
Gold medal – first place	2021 Dubai	Light flyweight
Gold medal – first place	2022 Amman	Minimumweight
Youth World Championships
Bronze medal – third place	2014 Sofia	Women's flyweight

Alua Balkibekova (born 24 November 1996) is a Kazakhstani boxer. She participated at the 2014 AIBA Youth World Boxing Championships, being awarded the bronze medal in the women's flyweight event. In the same year, Balkibekova participated at the 2014 Summer Youth Olympics in the boxing competition, winning no medal. She also participated at the 2019 AIBA Women's World Boxing Championships in the light flyweight event, winning no medal. Balkibekova then participated at the 2022 IBA Women's World Boxing Championships, being awarded the silver medal in the minimumweight event. In the final match, she was defeated by Ayşe Çağırır.
