= Sabina Bobokulova =

Uzbekistan boxer (born 2003)

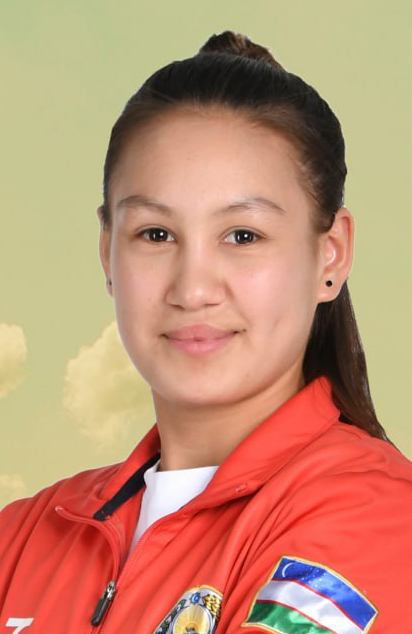
- Bobokulova in 2024

Personal information
- Nationality: Uzbekistan
- Born: 29 July 2003 (age 22) Bukhara, Uzbekistan

Boxing career
Medal record
Women's amateur boxing
Representing Uzbekistan
World Championships
Bronze medal – third place	2025 Liverpool	48 kg
IBA World Championships
Bronze medal – third place	2025 Niš	Light flyweight
Asian Championships
Bronze medal – third place	2024 Chiang Mai	Light flyweight

Sabina Komiljon kizi Bobokulova (Uzbek: Сабина Комилжон қизи Бобоқулова, romanized: Sabina Komiljon qizi Boboqulova; born 29 July 2003) is an Uzbekistani boxer who competes in the mini flyweight division. She competed at the 2024 Summer Olympics in Paris, the 2025 IBA Women's World Boxing Championships and the 2025 World Boxing Championships, winning a bronze medal in the latter two.

== Amateur career ==
Since 2019, Bobokulova has been coached by Ulugbek Baratov.

In 2019, she won the Asian Junior Championship. In 2021, Bobokulova won the Youth Championship in Dubai. In 2022, she competed in the U22 weight category in Tashkent and in 2023, in Bangkok, where she won first place.

In March 2024, Bobokulova competed in the Olympic Qualification Tournament 1 in Italy. Her first fight was on 8 March 2024, in Busto Arsizio, and her first opponent was Danisha Mathialagan from Singapore. Bobokulova defeated her and advanced to the next round. Her next fight was on 10 March 2024, against Irishwoman Daina Moorehouse. Bobokulova defeated her and reached the quarterfinals. In the quarterfinals, held on 11 March 2024, she faced Rinka Kinoshita from Japan. Bobokulova defeated her and earned a chance to participate in the 2024 Summer Olympics.

On 1 August 2024, Bobokulova's first bout at the Summer Olympics took place, where she faced Chuthamat Raksat from Thailand. She lost the bout 5–0.

Bobokulova won a bronze medal in the light flyweight category at the 2025 IBA Women's World Boxing Championships in Niš, Serbia, in which she was eliminated by Hu Meiyi in the semifinals.

Bobokulova competed in the 48 kg category of the 2025 World Boxing Championships held in Liverpool, England. She defeated Angelika Krysztoforska in the round of 16 and Giovanna Marchese in the quarterfinals, both by unanimous decision. In the semifinals, Bobokulova lost to Nazym Kyzaibay, winning a bronze medal.
