= 2018 Women's European Amateur Boxing Championships =

Boxing competitions

2018 Women's European Boxing Championships
- Host city: Sofia
- Country: Bulgaria
- Dates: 5–12 June
- Main venue: Asics Arena

The 2018 Women’s European Boxing Championships was hosted and organized by the Bulgarian Boxing Association in Asics Arena, Sofia, Bulgaria in 2018. The event was held from 5 to 12 June 2018. The tournament was organized in association with the European Boxing Confederation (EUBC).

== Medal table ==
* Host nation (Bulgaria)

Rank	Nation	Gold	Silver	Bronze	Total
1	Russia	3	4	2	9
2	Bulgaria*	3	1	2	6
3	Finland	2	0	0	2
4	Italy	1	0	2	3
5	Netherlands	1	0	0	1
6	Turkey	0	3	1	4
7	Ukraine	0	1	3	4
8	France	0	1	1	2
9	Belarus	0	0	2	2
9	Germany	0	0	2	2
9	Ireland	0	0	2	2
12	Poland	0	0	1	1
12	Romania	0	0	1	1
12	Wales	0	0	1	1
Totals (14 entries)		10	10	20	40

== Medal winners ==
Event	Gold	Silver	Bronze
Light flyweight (48kg)	(Russia) Ekaterina Paltceva	(Bulgaria) Sevda Asenova	(Ukraine) Hanna Okhota
Light flyweight (48kg)	(Russia) Ekaterina Paltceva	(Bulgaria) Sevda Asenova	(Romania) Steluța Duță
Flyweight (51kg)	(Russia) Svetlana Soluianova	(Turkey) Buse Naz Çakıroğlu	(Bulgaria) Gabriela Dimitrova
Flyweight (51kg)	(Russia) Svetlana Soluianova	(Turkey) Buse Naz Çakıroğlu	(Belarus) Yana Burym
Bantamweight (54kg)	(Bulgaria) Stoyka Petrova	(France) Delphine Mancini	(Russia) Viktoria Kuleshova
Bantamweight (54kg)	(Bulgaria) Stoyka Petrova	(France) Delphine Mancini	(Italy) Giulia De Laurenti
Featherweight (57kg)	(Bulgaria) Stanimira Petrova	(Russia) Daria Abramova	(France) Mona Mestiaen
Featherweight (57kg)	(Bulgaria) Stanimira Petrova	(Russia) Daria Abramova	(Republic of Ireland) Michaela Walsh
Lightweight (60kg)	(Finland) Mira Potkonen	(Russia) Anastasia Belyakova	(Republic of Ireland) Kellie Harrington
Lightweight (60kg)	(Finland) Mira Potkonen	(Russia) Anastasia Belyakova	(Bulgaria) Denitsa Eliseyeva
Light welterweight (64kg)	(Bulgaria) Melis Yonuzova	(Turkey) Sema Çalışkan	(Ukraine) Mariia Badulina-Bova
Light welterweight (64kg)	(Bulgaria) Melis Yonuzova	(Turkey) Sema Çalışkan	(Russia) Ekaterina Dynnik
Welterweight (69kg)	(Finland) Elina Gustafsson	(Russia) Yaroslava Yakushina	(Italy) Assunta Canfora
Welterweight (69kg)	(Finland) Elina Gustafsson	(Russia) Yaroslava Yakushina	(Germany) Nadine Apetz
Middleweight (75kg)	(Netherlands) Nouchka Fontijn	(Ukraine) Mariya Borutsa	(Germany) Sarah Scheurich
Middleweight (75kg)	(Netherlands) Nouchka Fontijn	(Ukraine) Mariya Borutsa	(Wales) Lauren Price
Light heavyweight (81kg)	(Russia) Maria Urakova	(Turkey) Elif Güneri	(Belarus) Viktoria Kebikova
Light heavyweight (81kg)	(Russia) Maria Urakova	(Turkey) Elif Güneri	(Ukraine) Anastasia Chernokolenko
Heavyweight (+81kg)	(Italy) Flavia Severin	(Russia) Kristina Tkacheva	(Turkey) Şennur Demir
Heavyweight (+81kg)	(Italy) Flavia Severin	(Russia) Kristina Tkacheva	(Poland) Lidia Fidura

== Participating nations ==
146 boxers from 32 nations competed.

- Armenia (2)
- Azerbaijan (1)
- Belarus (8)
- Bulgaria (7)
- Croatia (3)
- Czech Republic (5)
- Denmark (2)
- England (4)
- Finland (3)
- France (6)
- Georgia (1)
- Germany (9)
- Greece (3)
- Hungary (9)
- Ireland (3)
- Italy (8)
- Kosovo (1)
- Lithuania (2)
- Moldova (2)
- Montenegro (1)
- Netherlands (3)
- Norway (2)
- Poland (8)
- Romania (6)
- Russia (10)
- Slovenia (1)
- Serbia (4)
- Spain (6)
- Sweden (4)
- Turkey (10)
- Ukraine (10)
- Wales (2)

== Links ==
- Results
