= Ekaterina Paltceva =

Russian boxer (born 1997)

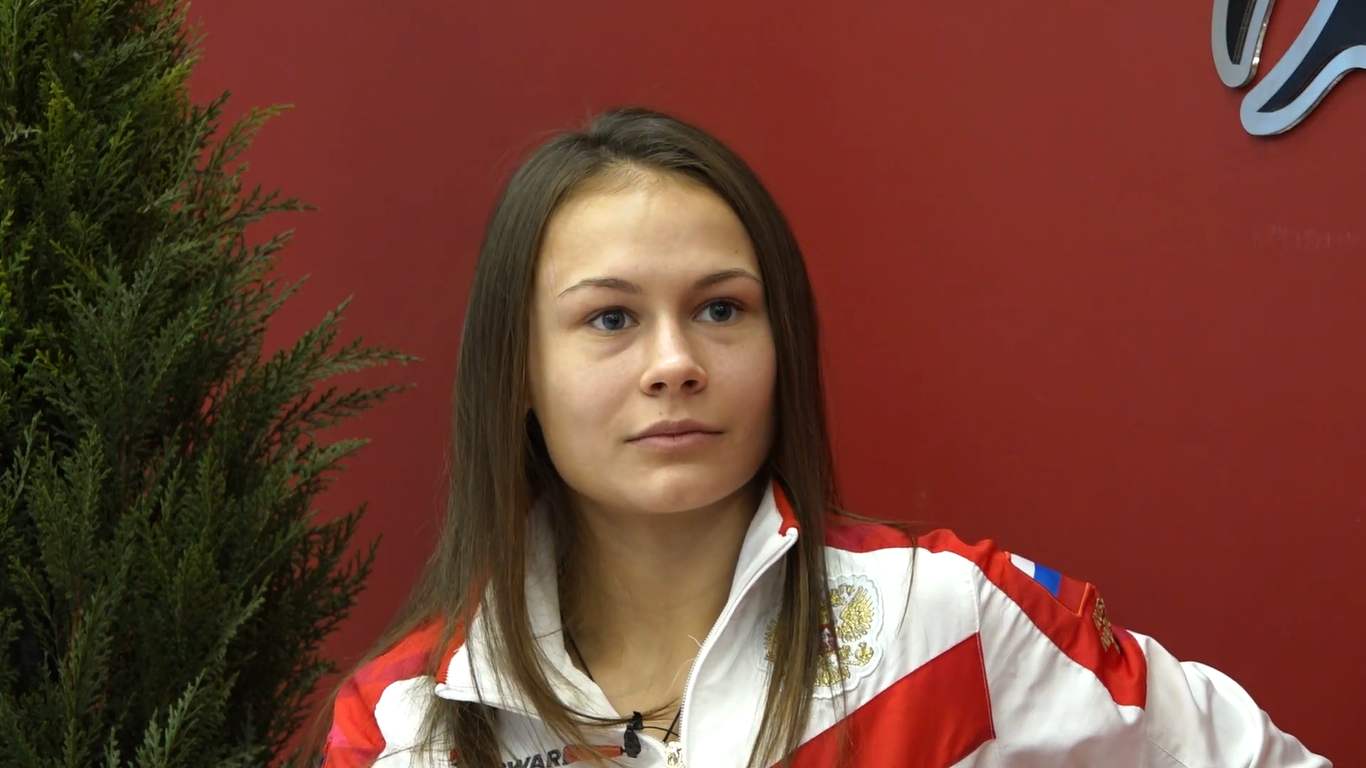

Personal information
- Nationality: Russian
- Born: 17 April 1997 (age 29)

Boxing career
- Weight class: Light flyweight

Boxing record
- Total fights: 4
- Wins: 2
- Win by KO: 0
- Losses: 2
- Draws: 0
- No contests: 0
Medal record
Women's amateur boxing
Representing Russia
World Championships
Gold medal – first place	2019 Ulan-Ude	Light flyweight
European Championships
Gold medal – first place	2018 Sofia	Light flyweight
World Military Boxing Championships
Gold medal – first place	2021 Moscow	Flyweight

Ekaterina Andreyevna Paltceva (Russian: Екатерина Андреевна Пальцева; born 17 April 1997) is a Russian boxer.

She won a medal at the 2019 AIBA Women's World Boxing Championships.
