= Kalaivani Srinivasan =

Female Indian boxer

- Srinivasan with Manju Rani at 2nd India Open International Boxing Tournament Guwahati

Personal information
- Full name: Kalaivani Srinivasan
- National team: India
- Citizenship: Indian
- Born: 25 November 1999 (age 26) Chennai, Tamil Nadu, India

Sport
- Country: India

Kalaivani Srinivasan (born 25 November 1999) is a female Indian boxer who competes in the 48 kg category. She won a silver medal at the Indian Seniors National Boxing Championship in Vijayanagar in 2019. She was named the ‘Most Promising Boxer’ at the Indian National Boxing Championship in 2019. She later won a gold medal at the South Asian Games in Kathmandu, Nepal in 2019.

== Personal life and background ==
Srinivasan was born in Washermenpet, Chennai, Tamil Nadu on 25 November 1999. Her father, M. Srinivasan was an amateur boxer and her brother Ranjith was a national level boxer as well. She developed an interest in boxing as a child while watching her father train her brother at home. Her family was financially strained and her father started farming to supplement their income and support Kalaivani's training. Kalaivani had started boxing in class 4.

== Professional achievements ==
She won a bronze medal at Sub-Junior Women's National Boxing Championship in 2012. She won a silver medal at the Senior Women's National Boxing Championship in 2019. She won a gold medal in the South Asian Games in Kathmandu, in 2019. Kalaivani currently competes in the 48 kg category which is not a part of Olympic games.
