= Amy Broadhurst =

British boxer (born 1997)

Personal information
- Full name: Amy Sara Broadhurst
- Nickname: Baby Canelo
- Nationality: Irish, British
- Born: 17 March 1997 (age 29) Dundalk, Ireland

Sport
- Sport: Boxing
- Weight class: Lightweight (60 kg); Light welterweight (64 kg); Welterweight (66 kg)
- Club: Dealgan Boxing Club (Dundalk, Ireland)
Medal record
Women's amateur boxing
Representing Ireland
World Championships
Gold medal – first place	2022 Istanbul	Light welterweight
European Championships
Gold medal – first place	2022 Budva	Light welterweight
Bronze medal – third place	2019 Alcobendas	Lightweight
Representing Northern Ireland
Commonwealth Games
Gold medal – first place	2022 Birmingham	Lightweight

Amy Sara Broadhurst (born 17 March 1997) is an Irish amateur boxer. She is the 2022 IBA World Light-welterweight champion, and won the gold medal in the lightweight division at the 2022 Commonwealth Games.

Broadhurst represented Ireland in the light welterweight division at the 2018 AIBA Women's World Boxing Championships. She won the bronze medal in the lightweight division at the 2019 Women's European Amateur Boxing Championships. She won successive gold medals in the lightweight division at the 2018 and 2019 EUBC European U22 Championships.

== Background ==
Amy Broadhurst has represented both Ireland and Northern Ireland at amateur level. Amy was born in Ireland but also qualifies for Northern Ireland through her father Tony, who was born in England. In 2024, when the Irish Athletic Boxing Association announced they would not be putting her forward for a 2024 Summer Olympics qualifier, Broadhurst was selected by Great Britain to appear in the event where she was beaten 4–1 by South Korea's Yeonji Oh.

== Media career ==
In 2016, Broadhurst and her family competed in the fourth series of the popular RTÉ reality competition, Ireland's Fittest Family. They were mentored by former camogie player, Anna Geary. They were eliminated in the quarterfinals of the competition.
