= Chelsey Heijnen =

Dutch boxer (born 1999)

Personal information
- Nationality: Dutch
- Born: 2 May 1999 (age 27)

Boxing career
Medal record
Women's amateur boxing
Representing Netherlands
World Championships
Bronze medal – third place	2022 Istanbul	Light-welterweight

Chelsey Heijnen (born 2 May 1999) is a Dutch amateur boxer who won a bronze medal at the 2022 World Championships.

== Biography ==
Heijnen started with playing rugby. She was given the advice to improve her footwork through boxing, and she continued with boxing. As a junior, Heijnen became European champion in Sofia 2017. In 2019 she won the silver medal at the Strandja Cup in the 64 kg category. Heijnen was nominated to become 2019 Roosendaal sportswomen of the year. In March 2020, Heijnen was not able to qualify for the 2020 Summer Olympics at the 2020 European Boxing Olympic Qualification Tournament. She competed at the 2022 IBA Women's World Boxing Championships in the light welterweight category and won the bronze medal. She was the only Dutch competitor at these 2022 World Championships.

She was trained (in 2019) by André de Klerk and coached by Abdul Fkiri.

Heijnen studied at the Johan Cruyff College where she earned a spot in the "Wall of Fame" in May 2019 and received her diploma in July 2019. Afterwards she started with a part-time study at the Academie voor Lichamelijke Opvoeding.
