= Boxing at the 2026 Asian Games – Women's 65 kg =

Women's 65 kg at the 2026 Asian Games
- Venue: Nishio City Gymnasium
- Dates: 24 September – 2 October 2026
- Competitors: 14 from 14 nations

Medalists
| gold medal | Parveen Hooda | India |
| silver medal | Chen Nien-chin | Chinese Taipei |
| bronze medal | Hwang Hyo-sun | North Korea |
| bronze medal | Li Shu | China |

The women's 65 kilograms event at the 2026 Asian Games took place from 24 September to 2 October 2026 at the Nishio City Gymnasium, Nishio, Aichi Prefecture, Japan.

The competition was a straight single-elimination tournament. Both semifinal losers were awarded bronze medals, so no boxers competed again after their first loss.

== Schedule ==
All times are Japan Standard Time (UTC+09:00)

| Date | Time | Event |
|---|---|---|
| Thursday, 24 September 2026 | 13:00 | Round of 16 |
| Sunday, 27 September 2026 | 17:00 | Quarterfinals |
| Tuesday, 29 September 2026 | 13:30 | Semifinals |
| Friday, 2 October 2026 | 17:45 | Final |

== Results ==
Legend

- WO — Won by walkover

Round of 16
Hoàng Ngọc Mai (VIE) | 0
Janjaem Suwannapheng (THA) | 5
Sarina Naghsh (IRI) | 3
Huswatun Hasanah (INA) | 2
Mai Kito (JPN) | 0
Hwang Hyo-sun (PRK) | 5
Navbakhor Khamidova (UZB) | 5
Seon Su-jin (KOR) | 0
Parveen Hooda (IND) | WO
Malika Nozimova (TJK)
Kusum Tamang (NEP) | 0
Li Shu (CHN) | 5

Quarterfinals
Chen Nien-chin (TPE) | 5
Janjaem Suwannapheng (THA) | 0
Sarina Naghsh (IRI) | 0
Hwang Hyo-sun (PRK) | 5
Navbakhor Khamidova (UZB) | 0
Parveen Hooda (IND) | 5
Li Shu (CHN) | 4
Aida Abikeyeva (KAZ) | 0

Semifinals
Chen Nien-chin (TPE) | 3
Hwang Hyo-sun (PRK) | 2
Parveen Hooda (IND) | 5
Li Shu (CHN) | 0

Final
Chen Nien-chin (TPE) | 2
Parveen Hooda (IND) | 3
