= Boxing at the 2019 European Games – Women's 51 kg =

Boxing competitions

Women's flyweight boxing at the 2019 European Games
- Venue: Uruchie Sports Palace
- Date: 23–30 June
- Competitors: 11 from 11 nations

Medalists
gold medal	Buse Naz Çakıroğlu	Turkey
silver medal	Svetlana Soluianova	Russia
bronze medal	Sandra Drabik	Poland
bronze medal	Gabriela Dimitrova	Bulgaria

The women's flyweight 51 kg boxing event at the 2019 European Games in Minsk was held from 23 to 30 June at the Uruchie Sports Palace.

== Results ==
Round of 16; 23 June
Veronica Losvik (NOR)	0
Claudia Nechita (ROU)	5
Volha Lushchyk (BLR)	0
Tetyana Kob (UKR)	4
Anush Grigoryan (ARM)	5
Nela Freiherrová (CZE)	0

Quarterfinals; 26 June
Svetlana Soluianova (RUS)	5
Claudia Nechita (ROU)	0
Katerina Koutsogeorgopoulou (GRE)	0
Gabriela Dimitrova (BUL)	5
Buse Naz Çakıroğlu (TUR)	5
Tetyana Kob (UKR)	0
Anush Grigoryan (ARM)	0
Sandra Drabik (POL)	5

Semifinals; 28 June
Svetlana Soluianova (RUS)	4
Gabriela Dimitrova (BUL)	1
Buse Naz Çakıroğlu (TUR)	5
Sandra Drabik (POL)	0

Final; 30 June
Svetlana Soluianova (RUS)	1
Buse Naz Çakıroğlu (TUR)	4
