= 2017 Women's European Union Amateur Boxing Championships =

Boxing competitions

2017 Women's European Union Boxing Championships
- Host city: Cascia
- Country: Italy
- Nations: 19
- Athletes: 90
- Events: 10
- Dates: 4–12 August

The 2017 Women's European Union Amateur Boxing Championships were held in Cascia, Italy from 4 to 12 August 2017. This was the 8th edition of this competition organised by the European governing body for amateur boxing, the European Boxing Confederation (EUBC).

== Medal table ==
* Host nation (Italy)

| Rank | Nation | Gold | Silver | Bronze | Total |
|---|---|---|---|---|---|
| 1 | Turkey | 3 | 1 | 0 | 4 |
| 2 | Italy* | 1 | 2 | 6 | 9 |
| 3 | Germany | 1 | 2 | 1 | 4 |
| 4 | Ireland | 1 | 1 | 1 | 3 |
| 5 | Bulgaria | 1 | 0 | 1 | 2 |
| 6 | Denmark | 1 | 0 | 0 | 1 |
| 6 | Finland | 1 | 0 | 0 | 1 |
| 6 | Netherlands | 1 | 0 | 0 | 1 |
| 9 | Poland | 0 | 2 | 1 | 3 |
| 10 | Sweden | 0 | 1 | 1 | 2 |
| 11 | Greece | 0 | 1 | 0 | 1 |
| 12 | England | 0 | 0 | 3 | 3 |
| 13 | France | 0 | 0 | 2 | 2 |
| 14 | Croatia | 0 | 0 | 1 | 1 |
| 14 | Czech Republic | 0 | 0 | 1 | 1 |
| Totals (15 entries) | | 10 | 10 | 18 | 38 |

== Medal winners ==
| Event | Gold | Silver | Bronze |
|---|---|---|---|
| Light flyweight (45–48 kg) | Sevda Asenova (BUL) | Roberta Bonatti (ITA) | Adriana Marczewska (POL) |
| Light flyweight (45–48 kg) | Sevda Asenova (BUL) | Roberta Bonatti (ITA) | Petra Laštovková (CZE) |
| Flyweight (51 kg) | Buse Naz Çakıroğlu (TUR) | Lise Sandebjer (SWE) | Gabriela Dimitrova (BUL) |
| Flyweight (51 kg) | Buse Naz Çakıroğlu (TUR) | Lise Sandebjer (SWE) | Roberta Mostarda (ITA) |
| Bantamweight (54 kg) | Michaela Walsh (IRL) | Azize Nimani (GER) | Helena Envall (SWE) |
| Bantamweight (54 kg) | Michaela Walsh (IRL) | Azize Nimani (GER) | Delphine Mancini (FRA) |
| Featherweight (57 kg) | Alessia Mesiano (ITA) | Ornella Wahner (GER) | Mona Mestiaen (FRA) |
| Featherweight (57 kg) | Alessia Mesiano (ITA) | Ornella Wahner (GER) | Sara Beram (CRO) |
| Lightweight (60 kg) | Mira Potkonen (FIN) | Kellie Harrington (IRL) | Shona Whitwell (ENG) |
| Lightweight (60 kg) | Mira Potkonen (FIN) | Kellie Harrington (IRL) | Irma Testa (ITA) |
| Light welterweight (64 kg) | Yvonne Rasmussen (DEN) | Carmela Donniacuo (ITA) | Joelle Seidou (GER) |
| Light welterweight (64 kg) | Yvonne Rasmussen (DEN) | Carmela Donniacuo (ITA) | Paige Murney (ENG) |
| Welterweight (69 kg) | Nadine Apetz (GER) | Hanna Solecka (POL) | Gráinne Walsh (IRL) |
| Welterweight (69 kg) | Nadine Apetz (GER) | Hanna Solecka (POL) | Monica Floridia (ITA) |
| Middleweight (75 kg) | Nouchka Fontijn (NED) | Busenaz Sürmeneli (TUR) | Natasha Gale (ENG) |
| Middleweight (75 kg) | Nouchka Fontijn (NED) | Busenaz Sürmeneli (TUR) | Assunta Canfora (ITA) |
| Light heavyweight (81 kg) | Elif Güneri (TUR) | Eleni Anna Michelekaki (GRE) | Martina Labarbera (ITA) |
| Heavyweight (+81 kg) | Şennur Demir (TUR) | Sylwia Kusiak (POL) | Annalisa Ghilardi (ITA) |

== Participating nations ==
90 competitors from 19 nations participated.

- Bulgaria
- Czech Republic
- England
- France
- Germany
- Denmark
- Finland
- Greece
- Hungary
- Ireland
- Italy
- Lithuania
- Moldova
- Poland
- Sweden
- Turkey
- Wales
- Netherlands
- Montenegro
