= Aldana López =

Argentine boxer

Personal information
- Nickname: La Avispa
- Born: Aldana Florencia López; October 10, 1996 (age 29) Buenos Aires, Argentina
- Weight: Light flyweight; Flyweight; Super flyweight

Boxing career
- Stance: Orthodox

Boxing record
- Total fights: 10
- Wins: 10
- Win by KO: 0
Medal record
Boxing
Representing Argentina
World Championships
Bronze medal – third place	2022 Istanbul	Minimumweight
South American Games
Bronze medal – third place	2022 Asunción	Light flyweight

Aldana López is an Argentine professional boxer. As an amateur, she participated at the 2022 IBA Women's World Boxing Championships, being awarded the bronze medal in the minimumweight event. López was the first and only person of her country to win a medal.

== Professional boxing record ==
10 fights	10 wins	0 losses
By decision	10	0

No.	Result	Record	Opponent	Type	Round, time	Date	Location	Notes
10	Win	10–0	Debora Gomez	UD	10	17 Nov 2023	Estadio F.A.B., Buenos Aires, Argentina	Retained FAB Argentinian female light flyweight title
9	Win	9–0	Carolina Ferrari	UD	10	17 Jun 2023	Club Social y Deportivo Sportivo Pontevedra, Pontevedra, Argentina	Won vacant FAB Argentinian female light flyweight title
8	Win	8–0	Maria Echenique	UD	6	8 Apr 2023	Gimnasio JCL, Merlo, Argentina	
7	Win	7–0	Carolina Ferrari	SD	10	7 Jan 2023	Plaza Dr. Bujan, Paso del Rey, Argentina	
6	Win	6–0	Fabiola Caporal Marquez	UD	4	25 Nov 2022	Mérida, Mexico	
5	Win	5–0	Lucrecia Belen Arrieta	UD	6	20 Aug 2022	Parque La Pedrera, Villa Mercedes, Argentina	
4	Win	4–0	Maria Echenique	UD	6	18 Jun 2022	Club Ferro Carril Oeste, Merlo, Argentina	
3	Win	3–0	Victoria Benavidez	UD	4	30 Oct 2021	Club Prado Español, Villa Nueva, Argentina	
2	Win	2–0	Lucia De Los Angeles Ruiz	UD	4	14 Aug 2021	Club Ferro Carril Oeste, Merlo, Argentina	
1	Win	1–0	Maria Florencia Cuello	SD	4	15 May 2021	Complejo Multifuncion, Pérez, Argentina	
