= Parveen Hooda =

Indian boxer (born 2000)

Personal information
- Born: 15 April 2000 (age 26) Rurki, Rohtak district, Haryana, India
- Height: 1.72 m (5 ft 8 in)

Boxing career
- Stance: Orthodox
Medal record
Women's amateur boxing
Representing India
World Championships
Bronze medal – third place	2022 Istanbul	63 kg
World Cup
Gold medal – first place	2025 New Delhi	60 kg
Asian Games
Gold medal – first place	2026 Aichi-Nagoya	65 kg
Asian Championships
Gold medal – first place	2022 Amman	63 kg
South Asian Games
Gold medal – first place	2019 Kathmandu	60 kg

Parveen Hooda (born 15 April 2000) is an Indian amateur boxer. She has won gold medals in the 2025 World Cup, 2026 Asian Games, and the 2022 Asian Championships. She serves as an assistant sub-inspector in the Indo-Tibetan Border Police.

== Biography ==
Hooda won a bronze medal in the light welterweight cateogry at the 2022 World Championships at Istanbul. In November 2022, she won the gold medal in the 63 kg category at the 2022 Asian Championships at Amman.

Hooda won the bronze medal in the 57 kg category at the 2022 Asian Games. However, she was stripped of her medal after being suspended by the World Anti-Doping Agency after the International Testing Agency reported her for whereabouts failure during the period between April 2022 and March 2023.

At the 2026 Asian Games, she won the gold medal in the 65 kg category after defeating Chen Nien-chin in the final by a 3-2 split decision.
