= Minakshi Hooda =

Indian boxer

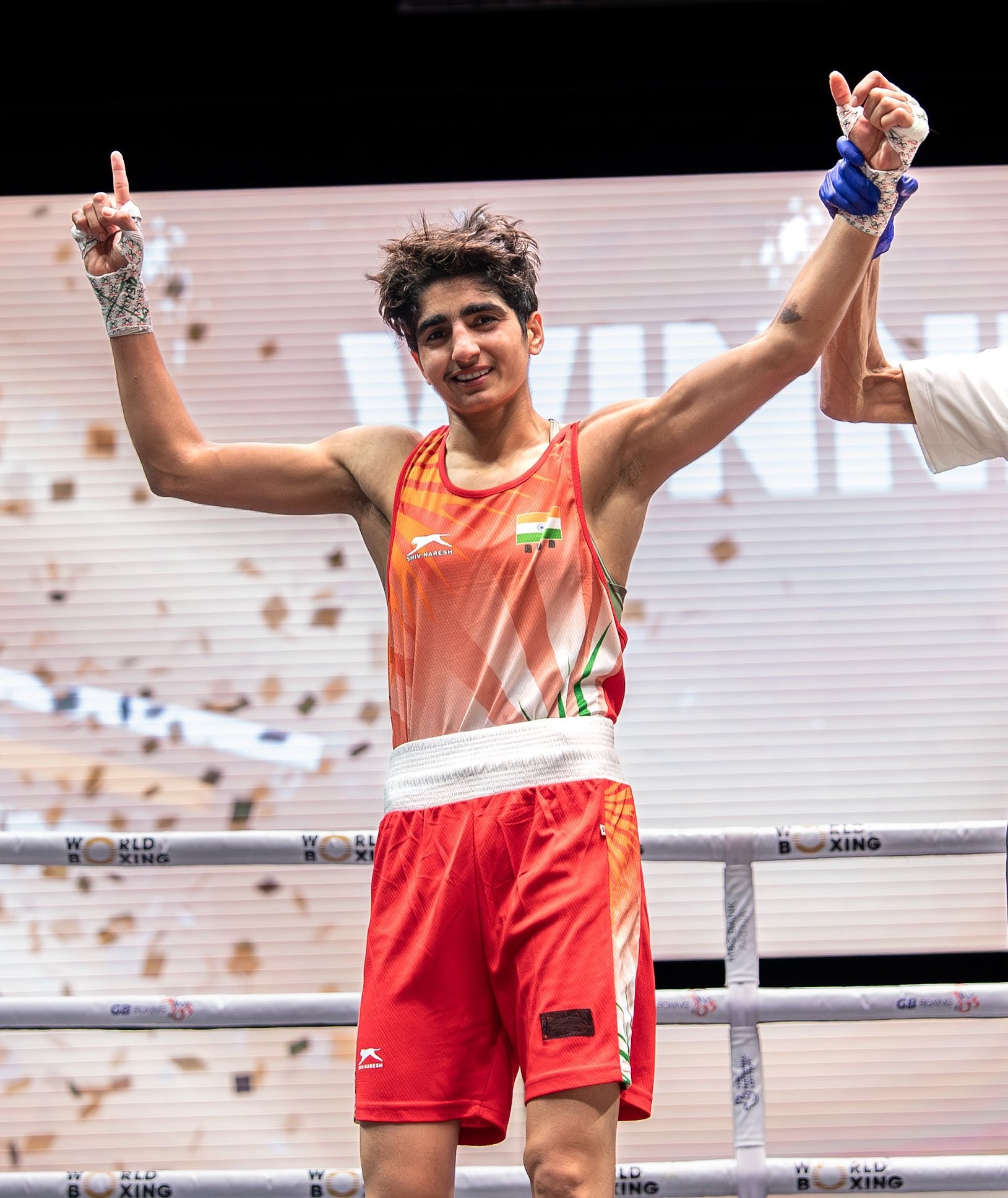
- Hooda at the 2025 World Championships

Personal information
- Born: 2 August 2001 (age 25) Rurki, Rohtak, Haryana, India
- Education: Bachelor of Arts
- Height: 1.63 m (5 ft 4 in)
- Military career
- Branch: Indo-Tibetan Border Police
- Service years: 2022—present
- Rank: Constable
Medal record
Women's amateur boxing
Representing India
World Championships
Gold medal – first place	2025 Liverpool	48kg
World Cup
Gold medal – first place	2025 New Delhi	48kg
Silver medal – second place	2025 Astana	48kg
Asian Championships
Silver medal – second place	2022 Amman	52kg
Asian Elite Championships
Gold medal – first place	2026 Ulaanbaatar	48 kg
BRICS Games
Gold medal – first place	2024 Kazan	48kg

Minakshi Hooda (born 2 August 2001) is an Indian boxer. She won a gold medal at the 2025 World Championships and a silver medal at the 2022 Asian Championships.

== Early life ==
Minakshi is from the village of Rurki, Rohtak, in the Indian state of Haryana. She is the youngest of four children born to Srikrishan Hooda, who works as an auto rickshaw driver. She is the first person from her family to be involved in sports. At age 12, she joined a local boxing academy run by Vijay Hooda. Her father was at first opposed to the idea, saying that "I didn't think I could afford the cost of raising a sportsperson. I could barely afford the roof over our heads ... How would I be able to afford a sports person's specialised diet or her equipment?" After Vijay Hooda offered to support her, her father allowed her to join the academy.

== Career ==
In 2017, Minakshi won a sub-junior championship. She won the title in her event at the Khelo India School Games in 2018 and then was champion of the Youth Nationals in 2019. Two years after her Youth Nationals title, she won silver at the senior national championships in 2021. The next year, she was selected to compete at the 2022 Asian Amateur Boxing Championships in Amman, Jordan. Participating in the 52 kg event (flyweight), she won the silver medal after being defeated by Rinka Kinoshita of Japan in the finals. Due to her achievements at the Asian Championships, she received a position working for the Indo-Tibetan Border Police. She told Sportstar that this "took care of a lot of the financial trouble in our family. I even was able to get my father his own auto rickshaw so he didn't have to rent one anymore".

Minakshi won national titles in 2023 and 2024 and also won the 2024 Elorda Cup. By 2025, she dropped from the 52 kg weight class to the 48 kg weight class. She won gold at the 2025 national championships after defeating world champion Nitu Ghanghas. She also won bronze at the 2025 World Boxing Cup. Later that year, she competed at the World Boxing Championships in Liverpool in the 48 kg event. She reached the finals of her event and defeated Olympic medalist Nazym Kyzaibay of Kazakhstan to become world champion. She was the first world champion from her village.
