= 2022 Asian Amateur Boxing Championships =

2022 Asian Boxing Championships
- Venue: Martyr Rashid Al-Zayoud Hall
- Location: Amman, Jordan
- Dates: 1–12 November 2022

The 2022 Asian Amateur Boxing Championships were held from 1 to 12 November 2022 in Amman, Jordan. It was the third time in the tournament's history that men and women fought in the same championship.

== Medal summary ==
=== Men ===
Event	Gold	Silver	Bronze
Minimumweight (48 kg)	Sanzhar Tashkenbay; Kazakhstan	Kazuma Aratake; Japan	Zohaib Rasheed; Pakistan
Minimumweight (48 kg)	Sanzhar Tashkenbay; Kazakhstan	Kazuma Aratake; Japan	Govind Kumar Sahani; India
Flyweight (51 kg)	Hasanboy Dusmatov; Uzbekistan	Saken Bibossinov; Kazakhstan	Tomoya Tsuboi; Japan
Flyweight (51 kg)	Hasanboy Dusmatov; Uzbekistan	Saken Bibossinov; Kazakhstan	Kharkhüügiin Enkhmandakh; Mongolia
Bantamweight (54 kg)	Carlo Paalam; Philippines	Makhmud Sabyrkhan; Kazakhstan	Shakhzod Muzafarov; Uzbekistan
Bantamweight (54 kg)	Carlo Paalam; Philippines	Makhmud Sabyrkhan; Kazakhstan	Sanzhai Seidekmatov; Kyrgyzstan
Featherweight (57 kg)	Abdumalik Khalokov; Uzbekistan	Serik Temirzhanov; Kazakhstan	Mohammad Hussamuddin; India
Featherweight (57 kg)	Abdumalik Khalokov; Uzbekistan	Serik Temirzhanov; Kazakhstan	Gantömöriin Lundaa; Mongolia
Lightweight (60 kg)	Mohammad Abu Jajeh; Jordan	Bayarkhüügiin Buyandalai; Mongolia	Samatali Toltayev; Kazakhstan
Lightweight (60 kg)	Mohammad Abu Jajeh; Jordan	Bayarkhüügiin Buyandalai; Mongolia	Adkhamjon Mukhiddinov; Uzbekistan
Light welterweight (63.5 kg)	Ruslan Abdullaev; Uzbekistan	Shiva Thapa; India	Lai Chu-en; Chinese Taipei
Light welterweight (63.5 kg)	Ruslan Abdullaev; Uzbekistan	Shiva Thapa; India	Bakhodur Usmonov; Tajikistan
Welterweight (67 kg)	Bunjong Sinsiri; Thailand	Dulat Bekbauov; Kazakhstan	Baatarsükhiin Chinzorig; Mongolia
Welterweight (67 kg)	Bunjong Sinsiri; Thailand	Dulat Bekbauov; Kazakhstan	Asadkhuja Muydinkhujaev; Uzbekistan
Light middleweight (71 kg)	Aslanbek Shymbergenov; Kazakhstan	Zeyad Ishaish; Jordan	Nuradin Rustambek Uulu; Kyrgyzstan
Light middleweight (71 kg)	Aslanbek Shymbergenov; Kazakhstan	Zeyad Ishaish; Jordan	Otgonbaataryn Byamba-Erdene; Mongolia
Middleweight (75 kg)	Saidjamshid Jafarov; Uzbekistan	Nurkanat Raiys; Kazakhstan	Shahin Mousavi; Iran
Middleweight (75 kg)	Saidjamshid Jafarov; Uzbekistan	Nurkanat Raiys; Kazakhstan	Sumit Kundu; India
Light heavyweight (80 kg)	Hussein Ishaish; Jordan	Odiljon Aslonov; Uzbekistan	Omurbek Bekzhigit Uulu; Kyrgyzstan
Light heavyweight (80 kg)	Hussein Ishaish; Jordan	Odiljon Aslonov; Uzbekistan	Nurbek Oralbay; Kazakhstan
Cruiserweight (86 kg)	Jakkapong Yomkhot; Thailand	Odai Al-Hindawi; Jordan	Erkin Adylbek Uulu; Kyrgyzstan
Cruiserweight (86 kg)	Jakkapong Yomkhot; Thailand	Odai Al-Hindawi; Jordan	Sagyndyk Togambay; Kazakhstan
Heavyweight (92 kg)	Aibek Oralbay; Kazakhstan	Madiyar Saydrakhimov; Uzbekistan	Ahmad Teimat; Jordan
Heavyweight (92 kg)	Aibek Oralbay; Kazakhstan	Madiyar Saydrakhimov; Uzbekistan	Toufan Sharifi; Iran
Super heavyweight (+92 kg)	Lazizbek Mullojonov; Uzbekistan	Kamshybek Kunkabayev; Kazakhstan	Muhammad Abroridinov; Tajikistan
Super heavyweight (+92 kg)	Lazizbek Mullojonov; Uzbekistan	Kamshybek Kunkabayev; Kazakhstan	Narender Berwal; India

=== Women ===
Event	Gold	Silver	Bronze
Minimumweight (48 kg)	Alua Balkibekova; Kazakhstan	Hikaru Kato; Japan	Farzona Fozilova; Uzbekistan
Minimumweight (48 kg)	Alua Balkibekova; Kazakhstan	Hikaru Kato; Japan	Bak Cho-rong; South Korea
Light flyweight (50 kg)	Nguyễn Thị Tâm; Vietnam	Tsukimi Namiki; Japan	Kang Do-yeon; South Korea
Light flyweight (50 kg)	Nguyễn Thị Tâm; Vietnam	Tsukimi Namiki; Japan	Nazym Kyzaibay; Kazakhstan
Flyweight (52 kg)	Rinka Kinoshita; Japan	Minakshi Hooda; India	Lutsaikhany Altantsetseg; Mongolia
Flyweight (52 kg)	Rinka Kinoshita; Japan	Minakshi Hooda; India	Zhazira Urakbayeva; Kazakhstan
Bantamweight (54 kg)	Zhaina Shekerbekova; Kazakhstan	Jutamas Jitpong; Thailand	Oyuntsetsegiin Yesügen; Mongolia
Bantamweight (54 kg)	Zhaina Shekerbekova; Kazakhstan	Jutamas Jitpong; Thailand	Huang Hsiao-wen; Chinese Taipei
Featherweight (57 kg)	Karina Ibragimova; Kazakhstan	Sena Irie; Japan	Preeti Pawar; India
Featherweight (57 kg)	Karina Ibragimova; Kazakhstan	Sena Irie; Japan	Nesthy Petecio; Philippines
Lightweight (60 kg)	Oh Yeon-ji; South Korea	Tögsjargalyn Nomin-Erdene; Mongolia	Wu Shih-yi; Chinese Taipei
Lightweight (60 kg)	Oh Yeon-ji; South Korea	Tögsjargalyn Nomin-Erdene; Mongolia	Porntip Buapa; Thailand
Light welterweight (63 kg)	Parveen Hooda; India	Mai Kito; Japan	Uranbilegiin Shinetsetseg; Mongolia
Light welterweight (63 kg)	Parveen Hooda; India	Mai Kito; Japan	Jeong Hae-deun; South Korea
Welterweight (66 kg)	Navbakhor Khamidova; Uzbekistan	Choi Hong-eun; South Korea	Ankushita Boro; India
Welterweight (66 kg)	Navbakhor Khamidova; Uzbekistan	Choi Hong-eun; South Korea	Madina Nurshayeva; Kazakhstan
Light middleweight (70 kg)	Chen Nien-chin; Chinese Taipei	Baison Manikon; Thailand	Enkhbaataryn Erdenetuyaa; Mongolia
Light middleweight (70 kg)	Chen Nien-chin; Chinese Taipei	Baison Manikon; Thailand	Dariga Shakimova; Kazakhstan
Middleweight (75 kg)	Lovlina Borgohain; India	Sokhiba Ruzmetova; Uzbekistan	Seong Su-yeon; South Korea
Middleweight (75 kg)	Lovlina Borgohain; India	Sokhiba Ruzmetova; Uzbekistan	Hergie Bacyadan; Philippines
Light heavyweight (81 kg)	Saweety Boora; India	Gulsaya Yerzhan; Kazakhstan	Nguyễn Thị Hương; Vietnam
Light heavyweight (81 kg)	Saweety Boora; India	Gulsaya Yerzhan; Kazakhstan	Lina Jaber; Jordan
Heavyweight (+81 kg)	Alfiya Pathan; India	Islam Husaili; Jordan	Lazzat Kungeibayeva; Kazakhstan
Heavyweight (+81 kg)	Alfiya Pathan; India	Islam Husaili; Jordan	None awarded

== Medal table ==
Rank	Nation	Gold	Silver	Bronze	Total
1	Kazakhstan	6	7	8	21
2	Uzbekistan	6	3	4	13
3	India	4	2	6	12
4	Jordan	2	3	2	7
5	Thailand	2	2	1	5
6	Japan	1	5	1	7
7	South Korea	1	1	4	6
8	Chinese Taipei	1	0	3	4
9	Philippines	1	0	2	3
10	Vietnam	1	0	1	2
11	Mongolia	0	2	8	10
12	Kyrgyzstan	0	0	4	4
13	Iran	0	0	2	2
13	Tajikistan	0	0	2	2
15	Pakistan	0	0	1	1
Totals (15 entries)		25	25	49	99
