= Liliya Aetbaeva =

Russian boxer (born 1993)

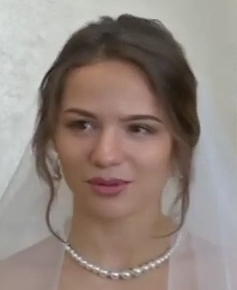

Personal information
- Nationality: Russian
- Born: 9 November 1993 (age 32) Prokopyevsk, Russia

Boxing career
- Weight class: Flyweight

Boxing record
- Total fights: 8
- Wins: 6
- Win by KO: 0
- Losses: 2
- Draws: 0
- No contests: 0
Medal record
Women's amateur boxing
Representing Russia
World Championships
Gold medal – first place	2019 Ulan-Ude	Flyweight

Liliya Tagirovna Aetbaeva (Russian: Лилия Тагировна Аетбаева; born 9 November 1993) is a Russian boxer.

She won a medal at the 2019 AIBA Women's World Boxing Championships.
