= Ayşe Çağırır =

Turkish boxer (born 1995)

Personal information
- Born: 1 January 1995 (age 31) Istanbul, Turkey
- Height: 1.60 m (5 ft 3 in)
- Weight: Light flyweight

Boxing career
- Stance: orthodox

Boxing record
- Total fights: 28
- Wins: 18
- Win by KO: 0
- Losses: 10
- Draws: 0
- No contests: 0
Medal record
Women's amateur boxing
Representing Turkey
World Championships
Gold medal – first place	2022 Istanbul	Minimumweight
European Championships
Bronze medal – third place	2014 Bucharest	Light flyweight
Mediterranean Games
Silver medal – second place	2022 Oran	Minimumweight

Ayşe Çağırır (born 1 January 1995) is a Turkish female boxer competing in the light flyweight (48 kg) division. She is a European Championship bronze medalist.

== Boxing career ==
In 2014, she won a bronze medal at the European Championships in Bucharest. After two point victories in the 1/8 finals and the quarterfinals, Çağırır lost in the semifinals to the representative of Bulgaria Sevda Asenova. In November of the same year, she represented Turkey at the World Championships in Jeju, where she fell in the 1/8 finals.

On 19 May 2022, Çağırır won the gold medal in the 48 kg category at the Women's World Championship defeating Kazakhstan's Alua Balkibekova in the minimumweight final in Istanbul, Turkey.
