= 2014 Women's European Amateur Boxing Championships =

Boxing competitions

2014 Women's European Boxing Championships
- Host city: Bucharest
- Country: Romania
- Dates: 31 May–7 June
- Main venue: Asics Arena

The Women’s European Boxing Championships was hosted and organised by the Romania Boxing Association in Romania in 2014. The event was held in Bucharest in Romania from May 31–June 7.

The tournament was organised in association with the European Boxing Confederation (EUBC).

== Contestants ==
The organisers of the event expect to welcome women boxers, competing in 10 different weight classes.

== Medal table ==
* Host nation (Romania)

Rank	Nation	Gold	Silver	Bronze	Total
1	Russia	2	1	2	5
2	Bulgaria	1	2	1	4
3	Romania*	1	1	3	5
4	Italy	1	1	1	3
5	Hungary	1	0	3	4
6	Azerbaijan	1	0	1	2
6	Ireland	1	0	1	2
6	Ukraine	1	0	1	2
9	Netherlands	1	0	0	1
10	England	0	2	0	2
11	France	0	1	2	3
12	Germany	0	1	1	2
12	Poland	0	1	1	2
14	Turkey	0	0	2	2
15	Croatia	0	0	1	1
Totals (15 entries)		10	10	20	40

== Medal winners ==
Event	Gold	Silver	Bronze
Light flyweight (48kg)	(Romania) Steluța Duță	(Bulgaria) Sevda Asenova	(Germany) Anne Marie Stark (Turkey) Ayşe Çağırır
Flyweight (51kg)	(Bulgaria) Stoyka Petrova	(Russia) Saiana Sagataeva	(France) Wassila Lkhadiri (Hungary) Katalin Ancsin
Bantamweight (54kg)	(Italy) Marzia Davide	(Poland) Ewelina Wicherska	(France) Marine Rostan (Russia) Elena Saveleva
Featherweight (57kg)	(Russia) Zinaida Dobrynina	(Bulgaria) Svetlana Staneva	(Ukraine) Maryna Malovana (Italy) Alessia Mesiano
Lightweight (60kg)	(Republic of Ireland) Katie Taylor	(France) Estelle Mossely	(Bulgaria) Denitsa Eliseyeva (Russia) Sofia Ochigava
Light welterweight (64kg)	(Russia) Anastasiia Beliakova	(England) Natasha Jonas	(Romania) Simona Sitar (Poland) Kinga Siwa
Welterweight (69kg)	(Azerbaijan) Elena Vystropova	(England) Stacey Copeland	(Republic of Ireland) Clare Grace (Romania) Cristiana Stancu
Middleweight (75kg)	(Netherlands) Nouchka Fontijn	(Germany) Sarah Scheurich	(Azerbaijan) Leyla Javadova (Hungary) Tímea Nagy
Light heavyweight (81kg)	(Ukraine) Liliya Durnyeva	(Romania) Marinela Radu	(Croatia) Anamarija Maršić (Hungary) Petra Szatmári
Heavyweight (+81kg)	(Hungary) Mária Kovács	(Italy) Flavia Severin	(Romania) Elena-luminita Turcin (Turkey) Emine Bozduman
