= Demie-Jade Resztan =

English boxer (born 1996)

Personal information
- Born: 28 December 1996 (age 29) London, England
- Height: 158 cm (5 ft 2 in)

Boxing career
- Weight class: Minimumweight, Light-flyweight
- Stance: Southpaw
Medal record
Women's amateur boxing
Representing England
World Championships
| Bronze medal – third place | 2019 Ulan-Ude | Light flyweight |
European Championships
| Silver medal – second place | 2019 Alcobendas | Light flyweight |
| Bronze medal – third place | 2022 Budva | Minimumweight |
Commonwealth Games
| Silver medal – second place | 2022 Birmingham | Minimumweight |

Demie-Jade Resztan (born 28 December 1996) is an English amateur boxer who has won multiple international medals representing England including silver at the 2022 Commonwealth Games and bronze at the 2019 AIBA Women's World Boxing Championships.

== Career ==
Fighting in the light-flyweight category, Resztan won a bronze medal at the 2019 Women's European Amateur Boxing Championships in Spain losing in the semi-finals to Iulia Chumgalakova from Russia.

At 2019 AIBA Women's World Boxing Championships in Russia she again won bronze defeating Italy’s Roberta Bonatti by a 3-2 split decision in the quarter-finals before going down 4-1 to home boxer Ekaterina Paltceva in the last four.

Moving down to minimumweight, Resztan took a silver medal at the 2022 Commonwealth Games in Birmingham, England, beating Zambia’s Margret Tembo and Lethabo Modukanele of Botswana on her way to the final where she lost to India's Nitu Ghanghas by unanimous decision.

She won a bronze medal at the 2022 Women's European Amateur Boxing Championships in Montenegro, scoring a win over reigning world champion, Turkey’s Ayse Cagirir, in the minimumweight quarter-finals before losing out in the semi-finals to Roberta Bonatti.

Resztan was named female boxer of the year at the 2022 GB Boxing Annual Awards.

Returning to light-flyweight in a bid to qualify for the 2024 Summer Olympics, Resztan took part in the 2023 European Games in Poland but went out in the last 16 to Italy’s Giordana Sorrentino losing by unanimous decision.
