= Manju Rani (boxer) =

Indian boxer (born 1999)

- Rani with Kalaivani Srinivasan at 2nd India Open International Boxing Tournament Guwahati

Personal information
- Nationality: Indian
- Born: 26 October 1999 (age 26)

Boxing career
- Weight class: Light flyweight

Boxing record
- Total fights: 4
- Wins: 3
- Win by KO: 0
- Losses: 1
- Draws: 0
- No contests: 0
Medal record
Women's amateur boxing
Representing India
World Championships
Silver medal – second place	2019 Ulan-Ude	Light flyweight

Manju Rani (born 26 October 1999) is an Indian boxer. She won a silver medal at the 2019 AIBA Women's World Boxing Championships. She also won a silver medal at the Strandja Memorial Boxing Tournament 2019 held in Bulgaria and bronze medals at the Thailand Open 2017 and India Open 2017.

== Background ==
Rani hails from Rithal Phogat village in the Rohtak district of Haryana. Her father was a Border Security Force officer who died of cancer in 2010. The Rani had initially started playing kabaddi, but her coach advised her to switch to boxing. Inspired by Indian boxer MC Mary Kom's bronze-winning performance at the 2012 London Summer Olympics, Rani made a shift to boxing.

== Sports ==
Rani won a silver medal at the Strandja Memorial Boxing Tournament 2019, Bulgaria in 48 kg category after losing finals against Josie Gabuco of Philippines. She also won a silver medal at the 2019 AIBA Women's World Boxing Championships after losing Light flyweight final to Russia's Ekaterina Paltceva.

In 2019 Rani signed up with sports management firm Infinity Optimal Solutions (IOS) which will handle her endorsements and commercial interests. In November 2020, Rani served a notice of termination of contract on IOS Sports and Entertainment for not fulfilling the sponsorship deal.
