= Düzce University =

Public university in Düzce, Turkey

Duzce University
- Established: 2006
- Location: Düzce, Turkey
- Website: Official website

University rankings

Regional – Overall
- QS Emerging Europe and Central Asia: 221-230 (2022)

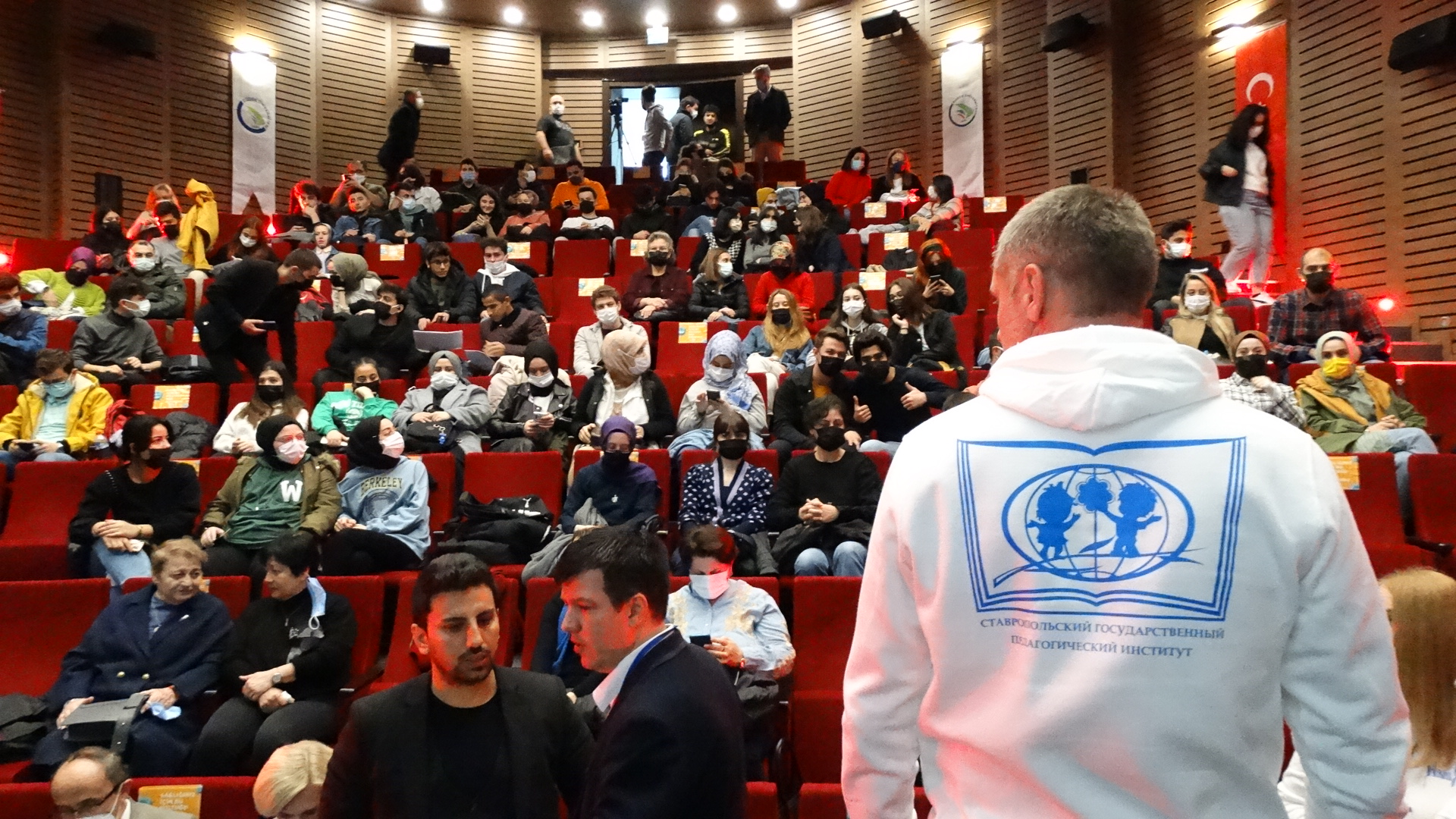
Russian-Turkish educational seminar at Düzce I University, 2021

Old logo (2006-2022)

Düzce University is a university located in Düzce, Turkey. It was established in 2006 but its oldest unit, Duzce Vocational School, has existed since 1976. In 2008, the university joined the National Quality Movement and received an Excellence 4 Star Award by the Turkish Quality Association (KALDER), within the scope of EFQM (European Foundation for Quality Management).

In May 2011 Düzce University won the European Enterprise Award for its project titled "Together We Can Do More", which promotes entrepreneurship.

In January 2012 the university became an official member of the European University Association (EUA).

== Affiliations ==
The university is a member of the Caucasus University Association.
