= Nitu Ghanghas =

Indian boxer (born 2000)

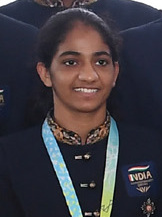
- Ghanghas 2022

Personal information
- Born: 19 October 2000 (age 26) Dhanana, Haryana, India
- Height: 1.63 m (5 ft 4 in)

Sport
- Sport: Boxing
Medal record
Women's amateur boxing
Representing India
World Championships
Gold medal – first place	2023 New Delhi	Minimumweight
Commonwealth Games
Gold medal – first place	2022Birmingham	Minimumweight
Youth World Championships
Gold medal – first place	2017 Guwahati	Light flyweight
Gold medal – first place	2018 Budapest	Light flyweight
Asian Championships
Gold medal – first place	2018 Bangkok	Light flyweight

Nitu Ghanghas (born 19 October 2000) is an Indian boxer. She is the 2023 World Champion in minimumweight category and a two-time world youth champion in light flyweight. She has also won gold medal at the 2022 Commonwealth Games in the minimumweight category.

== Early life ==
Nitu Ghanghas was born on 19 October 2000, in the Dhanana village of Haryana's Bhiwani district. Her father, Jai Bhagwan, was an employee at the Haryana Rajya Sabha in Chandigarh. Her mother's name is Mukesh Devi and Nitu has a younger brother named Akshit Kumar. According to Mukesh Devi, Nitu was a ‘naughty child’ and would often get into fights with her siblings and at school. Her father introduced Nitu to boxing to find a constructive way to channel the energy. Nitu Ghanghas started to formally train by the time she was 12 but she failed to make any inroads in the first couple of years. Frustrated by her lack of progress, Nitu Ghanghas decided to give up on the sport but her father intervened. Her father took a three-year-long unpaid leave from his job to help his daughter realize her dreams of becoming a boxer. He did some farming on a small stretch of land he owned and also took a loan of about six lakh rupees (about US$7500) to take care of the costs. He also oversaw Nitu's training and diet personally. During this period, Nitu Ghanghas was noticed by renowned coach Jagdish Singh, the founder of the renowned Bhiwani Boxing Club and one of the mentors of Vijender Singh. Nitu, a BA student at the Sri Guru Gobind Singh College, joined the Bhiwani Boxing Club and used to travel 40 km every day on her father's scooter to train.

== Career ==
=== 2022 Commonwealth Games ===
Nitu won the gold medal for India in the Commonwealth Games 2022 in Birmingham after defeating Demie-Jade Resztan of England by 5–0 on 7 August 2022 in the 48 category (minimumweight category).

=== 2023 IBA Women's World Boxing Championships ===
She became only the sixth Indian boxer (male or female) to become the World Champion after defeating Lutsaikhany Altantsetseg of Mongolia by 5–0 on 25 March 2023 in the minimumweight category.

== Achievements ==
International Titles
Year	Place	Weight	Competition	Location
2017	1st place, gold medalist(s)	48	Balkan Youth International Boxing Championship	Sofia, Bulgaria
2017	1st place, gold medalist(s)	48	Women's Youth World Boxing Championship	Guwahati, India
2018	1st place, gold medalist(s)	48	Asian Youth Championship	Bangkok, Thailand
2018	1st place, gold medalist(s)	48	Golden Glove of Vojvodina Youth Men & Women Boxing Tournament	Serbia
2018	1st place, gold medalist(s)	48	Youth Women World Championships	Budapest, Hungary
2022	1st place, gold medalist(s)	48	Strandja Memorial Boxing Tournament	Sofia, Bulgaria
2022	1st place, gold medalist(s)	45-48	XXII Commonwealth Games	Birmingham, England
2023	1st place, gold medalist(s)	48	IBA Women's World Boxing Championships	New Delhi, India
