= 2022 IBA Women's World Boxing Championships =

Boxing tournament in Istanbul

- Venue: Başakşehir Youth and Sports Facility
- Location: Başakşehir, Istanbul, Turkey
- Dates: 8–20 May
- Competitors: 310 from 73 (Note: 72 nations, plus the IBA Fair Chance Team) nations
- Total prize money: $2.4 million

The 2022 IBA Women's World Boxing Championships (the 12th edition of the championships) was held in Istanbul, Turkey from 8 to 20 May 2022.

Medal winners received prize money: gold medalists earned $100,000, silver medalists $50,000, and bronze medalists $25,000. The total prize fund was $2.4 million.

The programme was extended from 10 to 12 weight categories. Algeria, Kosovo, Lithuania, Mozambique, Spain and Uzbekistan won their first medals at the Women's World Boxing Championships.

== Schedule ==
All times are local (UTC+3).

Date	Time	Phase
9–10 May	18:00	Preliminaries
11–12 May	14:00	Preliminaries
11–12 May	18:00	Preliminaries
13–14 May	18:00	Preliminaries
15 May	14:00	Preliminaries
15 May	18:00	Preliminaries
16 May	14:00	Quarterfinals
16 May	18:00	Quarterfinals
Rest day (17 May)
18 May	14:00	Semifinals
18 May	18:00	Semifinals
19–20 May	18:00	Finals

== Medal summary ==
=== Medal table ===
* Host nation (Turkey)

Rank	Nation	Gold	Silver	Bronze	Total
1	Turkey*	5	0	2	7
2	Ireland	2	0	0	2
3	Canada	1	1	0	2
4	India	1	0	2	3
5	Chinese Taipei	1	0	0	1
5	Lithuania	1	0	0	1
5	United States	1	0	0	1
8	Kazakhstan	0	1	4	5
9	Thailand	0	1	2	3
10	Algeria	0	1	1	2
10	Brazil	0	1	1	2
10	Italy	0	1	1	2
10	Mozambique	0	1	1	2
10	Poland	0	1	1	2
15	Colombia	0	1	0	1
15	Morocco	0	1	0	1
15	Panama	0	1	0	1
15	Romania	0	1	0	1
19	Uzbekistan	0	0	2	2
20	Argentina	0	0	1	1
20	Australia	0	0	1	1
20	Bulgaria	0	0	1	1
20	France	0	0	1	1
20	Kosovo	0	0	1	1
20	Netherlands	0	0	1	1
20	Spain	0	0	1	1
Totals (26 entries)		12	12	24	48

=== Medal events ===
Event	Gold	Silver	Bronze
Minimumweight	Ayşe Çağırır; Turkey	Alua Balkibekova; Kazakhstan	Aldana López; Argentina
Minimumweight	Ayşe Çağırır; Turkey	Alua Balkibekova; Kazakhstan	Sevda Asenova; Bulgaria
Light flyweight	Buse Naz Çakıroğlu; Turkey	Ingrit Valencia; Colombia	Laura Fuertes; Spain
Light flyweight	Buse Naz Çakıroğlu; Turkey	Ingrit Valencia; Colombia	Aziza Yokubova; Uzbekistan
Flyweight	Nikhat Zareen; India	Jutamas Jitpong; Thailand	Caroline de Almeida; Brazil
Flyweight	Nikhat Zareen; India	Jutamas Jitpong; Thailand	Zhaina Shekerbekova; Kazakhstan
Bantamweight	Hatice Akbaş; Turkey	Lăcrămioara Perijoc; Romania	Preedakamon Tintabthai; Thailand
Bantamweight	Hatice Akbaş; Turkey	Lăcrămioara Perijoc; Romania	Dina Zholaman; Kazakhstan
Featherweight	Lin Yu-ting; Chinese Taipei	Irma Testa; Italy	Karina Ibragimova; Kazakhstan
Featherweight	Lin Yu-ting; Chinese Taipei	Irma Testa; Italy	Manisha Moun; India
Lightweight	Rashida Ellis; United States	Beatriz Ferreira; Brazil	Donjeta Sadiku; Kosovo
Lightweight	Rashida Ellis; United States	Beatriz Ferreira; Brazil	Alessia Mesiano; Italy
Light welterweight	Amy Broadhurst; Ireland	Imane Khelif; Algeria	Parveen Hooda; India
Light welterweight	Amy Broadhurst; Ireland	Imane Khelif; Algeria	Chelsey Heijnen; Netherlands
Welterweight	Busenaz Sürmeneli; Turkey	Charlie Cavanagh; Canada	Janjaem Suwannapheng; Thailand
Welterweight	Busenaz Sürmeneli; Turkey	Charlie Cavanagh; Canada	Ichrak Chaib; Algeria
Light middleweight	Lisa O'Rourke; Ireland	Alcinda Panguana; Mozambique	Sema Çalışkan; Turkey
Light middleweight	Lisa O'Rourke; Ireland	Alcinda Panguana; Mozambique	Valentina Khalzova; Kazakhstan
Middleweight	Tammara Thibeault; Canada	Atheyna Bylon; Panama	Rady Gramane; Mozambique
Middleweight	Tammara Thibeault; Canada	Atheyna Bylon; Panama	Davina Michel; France
Light heavyweight	Gabrielė Stonkutė; Lithuania	Oliwia Toborek; Poland	Elif Güneri; Turkey
Light heavyweight	Gabrielė Stonkutė; Lithuania	Oliwia Toborek; Poland	Jessica Bagley; Australia
Heavyweight	Şennur Demir; Turkey	Khadija El-Mardi; Morocco	Lidia Fidura; Poland
Heavyweight	Şennur Demir; Turkey	Khadija El-Mardi; Morocco	Mokhira Abdullaeva; Uzbekistan

== Participating nations ==
310 athletes from 72 countries and the IBA Fair Chance Team will participate in the championships:

1. Algeria (4)
2. Argentina (5)
3. Armenia (4)
4. Australia (10)
5. Barbados (1)
6. Bolivia (2)
7. Brazil (4)
8. Bulgaria (6)
9. Burundi (1)
10. Canada (4)
11. Cape Verde (1)
12. Cayman Islands (1)
13. Chile (1)
14. Chinese Taipei (7)
15. Colombia (4)
16. Croatia (4)
17. Democratic Republic of the Congo (5)
18. Dominican Republic (3)
19. Egypt (2)
20. England (4)
21. Fair Chance Team (2)
22. Finland (2)
23. France (5)
24. Germany (7)
25. Greece (2)
26. Guatemala (1)
27. Haiti (1)
28. Hungary (4)
29. India (12)
30. Ireland (9)
31. Italy (8)
32. Japan (8)
33. Kazakhstan (12)
34. Kenya (10)
35. Kosovo (1)
36. Kuwait (1)
37. Kyrgyzstan (1)
38. Latvia (1)
39. Lithuania (3)
40. Mali (1)
41. Mexico (3)
42. Mongolia (9)
43. Morocco (6)
44. Mozambique (2)
45. Nepal (4)
46. Netherlands (1)
47. Panama (1)
48. Paraguay (1)
49. Philippines (1)
50. Poland (8)
51. Puerto Rico (5)
52. Romania (5)
53. Scotland (1)
54. Senegal (2)
55. Serbia (6)
56. Sierra Leone (1)
57. Slovakia (1)
58. Slovenia (1)
59. South Africa (8)
60. South Korea (10)
61. Spain (5)
62. Sweden (2)
63. Tajikistan (4)
64. Thailand (6)
65. Tonga (1)
66. Trinidad and Tobago (2)
67. Turkey (12) (Host)
68. Ukraine (12)
69. United States (8)
70. Uzbekistan (10)
71. Venezuela (5)
72. Vietnam (1)
73. Wales (2)
- Belarusian and Russian boxers were not allowed to compete at the event after a ban as a result of the Russian invasion of Ukraine.
