= Sevda Asenova =

Bulgarian boxer (born 1985)

Personal information
- Nationality: Bulgaria
- Born: 5 January 1985 (age 41)

Boxing career
Medal record
Women's amateur boxing
Representing Bulgaria
World Championships
Bronze medal – third place	2022 Istanbul	Minimumweight
European Championships
Gold medal – first place	2016 Sofia	Minimumweight
Gold medal – first place	2022 Budva	Minimumweight
Silver medal – second place	2007 Vejle	Pinweight
Silver medal – second place	2014 Bucharest	Light flyweight
Silver medal – second place	2018 Sofia	Light flyweight
Bronze medal – third place	2024 Belgrade	Minimumweight
EU Amateur Championships
Gold medal – first place	2017 Cascia	Light flyweight

Sevda Asenova (born 5 January 1985) is a Bulgarian boxer. She competed at the 2022 IBA Women's World Boxing Championships, winning the bronze medal in the minimumweight event.
