= Yasmine Mouttaki =

Moroccan boxer (born 1997)

Medal record

Boxing

Representing Morocco

World Championships
Bronze medal – third place	2023 New Delhi	Minimumweight

African Games
Silver medal – second place	2019 Rabat	Flyweight
Bronze medal – third place	2023 Accra	Light flyweight

Mediterranean Games
Bronze medal – third place	2026 Taranto	Light flyweight

African Championships
Gold medal – first place	2017 Brazzaville	Flyweight
Gold medal – first place	2023 Yaoundé	Flyweight
Gold medal – first place	2024 Kinshasa	Flyweight

Yasmine Mouttaki (born 22 June 1997) is a Moroccan boxer. She is a two-time gold medalist in the women's 50 kg event at the African Championships.

== Career ==
In 2017, Mouttaki won the gold medal in the under 51 kg category at the African Amateur Boxing Championships in Brazzaville, Republic of the Congo. In 2019, she won the silver medal in the under 51 kg category at the All Africa Games in Rabat, Morocco.

At the 2022 Mediterranean Games, which took place in Oran, Algeria between 25 June and 5 July, Mouttaki came in 5th place in the flyweight category.

At the 2023 Women's World Amateur Boxing Championships in New Delhi, Mouttaki won the bronze medal in the under 48 kg category.
