= Roberta Bonatti =

Italian boxer (born 1997)

Personal information
- Nationality: Italian
- Born: 5 July 1997 (age 29) Piacenza, Italy
- Weight: Light flyweight

Boxing career

Boxing record
- Total fights: 15
- Wins: 9
- Win by KO: 1
- Losses: 6
Medal record
Women's amateur boxing
Representing Italy
European Championships
Silver medal – second place	2022 Budva	Minimumweight
Bronze medal – third place	2019 Alcobendas	Light flyweight
EU Amateur Championships
Silver medal – second place	2017 Cascia	Light flyweight

Roberta Bonatti (born 5 July 1997) is an Italian female boxer, athlete of the Centro Sportivo Carabinieri.

== Biography ==
Bonatti won two medals at the international amateur European level, at the EU Amateur Championships (2016) and European Championships (2019).
