= 2018 AIBA Women's World Boxing Championships – Light welterweight =

Boxing competitions

Light welterweight at the 2018 AIBA Women's World Boxing Championships
- Dates: 17–24 November
- Competitors: 30 from 30 nations

Medalists
gold medal	Dou Dan	China
silver medal	Mariia Bova	Ukraine
bronze medal	Sema Çalışkan	Turkey
bronze medal	Simranjit Kaur	India

The Light welterweight (64 kg) competition at the 2018 AIBA Women's World Boxing Championships was held from 16 to 24 November 2018.

== Draw ==
Round of 32
17 Nov
(Spain) Lucía Blázquez	0
(Germany) Maya Kleinhans	5
17 Nov
(Thailand) Suchada Panich	0
(Ukraine) Mariia Bova	5
17 Nov
(New Zealand) Cara Wharerau	0
(Denmark) Yvonne Bæk Rasmussen	5
17 Nov
(Croatia) Maja Šarić	1
(Romania) Dana Borzei	4
17 Nov
(Brazil) Gleisiele Gomes	1
(Turkey) Sema Çalışkan	4
17 Nov
(Australia) Jessica Messina	3
(Chinese Taipei) Lin Lee Wei-hsien	2
17 Nov
(Belarus) Antanina Aksenava	1
(Algeria) Soumaya Tabarkokt	4
17 Nov
(United States) Amelia Moore	1
(India) Simranjit Kaur	4
17 Nov
(Uzbekistan) Maftunakhon Melieva	0
(Scotland) Megan Reid	5
17 Nov
(Russia) Ekaterina Dynnik	1
(Republic of Ireland) Amy Broadhurst	4
17 Nov
(Armenia) Ani Hovsepyan	4
(Argentina) Dayana Sánchez	0
17 Nov
(Tajikistan) Shoira Zulkaynarova	5
(Puerto Rico) Stephanie Piñeiro	0
17 Nov
(Bulgaria) Melis Yonuzova	1
(Czech Republic) Martina Schmoranzová	4
17 Nov
(Poland) Natalia Barbusińska	0
(China) Dou Dan	5

Round of 16
19 Nov
(Kazakhstan) Milana Safronova	3
(Germany) Maya Kleinhans	2
19 Nov
(Ukraine) Mariia Bova	3
(Denmark) Yvonne Bæk Rasmussen	2
19 Nov
(Romania) Dana Borzei	0
(Turkey) Sema Çalışkan	5
19 Nov
(Australia) Jessica Messina	5
(Algeria) Soumaya Tabarkokt	0
19 Nov
(India) Simranjit Kaur	5
(Scotland) Megan Reid	0
19 Nov
(Republic of Ireland) Amy Broadhurst	5
(Armenia) Ani Hovsepyan	0
19 Nov
(Tajikistan) Shoira Zulkaynarova	3
(Czech Republic) Martina Schmoranzová	2
19 Nov
(China) Dou Dan	5
(Italy) Francesca Amato	0

Quarterfinals
20 Nov
(Kazakhstan) Milana Safronova	0
(Ukraine) Mariia Bova	5
20 Nov
(Turkey) Sema Çalışkan	4
(Australia) Jessica Messina	1
20 Nov
(India) Simranjit Kaur	3
(Republic of Ireland) Amy Broadhurst	1
20 Nov
(Tajikistan) Shoira Zulkaynarova	0
(China) Dou Dan	5

Semifinals
23 Nov
(Ukraine) Mariia Bova	4
(Turkey) Sema Çalışkan	1
23 Nov
(India) Simranjit Kaur	1
(China) Dou Dan	4

Final
24 Nov
(Ukraine) Mariia Bova	0
(China) Dou Dan	5
