= Akhara, Punjab =

Akhara
- village
- Interactive map of Akhara
- Coordinates: 30.7453456°N 75.4846997°E
- Country: India
- State: Punjab
- District: Ludhiana
- Tehsil: Jagraon
- Elevation: 234 m (768 ft)

Population (2010)
  - Total: 5,400

Languages
  - Official: Punjabi
- Time zone: UTC+5:30 (IST)
- PIN: 142026
- Telephone Type: 91-1624-XXXXXX
- Vehicle registration: PB 25 XXXX

Akhara is a village in the Tehsil Jagraon, Ludhiana, Punjab, India.

== Demographics ==
According to the 2001 Census, Akhara has a population of 5,900 people. Akhara was incorporated as a village, but due to population growth the size of the village is approaching that of a small town.

== History ==
Akhara can trace its beginning in the 17th century. It was brought into limelight by Baba Sahib Singh Singh Bedi.

Akhara has a significant number of families with the "Brar", "Samra", "Gill", "Baryar" and a few others like "saran", "Kaler", "Sidhu", "Samra (clan)", "Bhanot", "Saggu", "Sambhi", "Lohat", "Nahar", "Gharu", "Kanda", "Sekhon", "Bedi","Batish", Mattu" surnames.

== Location ==
Akhara lies on the Jagraon-Hathur road and situated at about 8 km from Jagraon. The nearest railway station to Akhara is Jagraon railway station at a distance of 6.5 km. Neighbouring villages include Roomi, Dholan, Kaonke Kalan, Bhamipura, Dalla, Bir Akhara and Kothe Premsar.

== Transport ==
The nearest station to Akhara is Jagraon Railway Station, situated on the main line between Ludhiana and Ferozpur. Regular state government owned Punjab Roadways (Jagraon Depot), Pepsu Transport (PRTC) and private bus services operate between Jagraon - Hathur, Jagraon - Barnala, Jagraon - Sangrur, Jagraon - Bilaspur through this village (Akhara). Also three wheeler Tempo service operate between Jagraon and Manuke through Akhara. For a personal service, a SUV, minivan or car taxi service can be hired from the Jagraon.

The nearest international airport is Amritsar about 120 km away, other international airport is in New Delhi situated at 350 km. Other airports are Sahnewal Airport near Ludhiana and a military air base is at Halwara, about 15 km from Akhara.

== Education ==
There are three schools located in the village- Govt Primary School, Akhara and Govt Secondary School, Akhara and The Unirise World School

== Other Institutions ==
- Union Bank, Akhara,
- Co-operative Agriculture Society
