= Sowaddi Kalan =

- Village
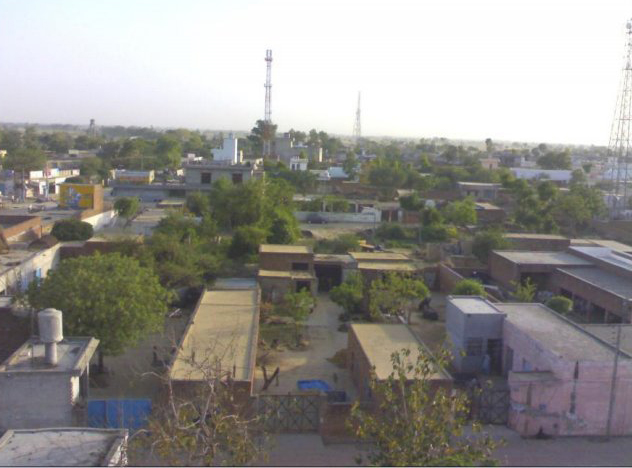
- Sowaddi Kalan
- Nickname: Swaddi
- Location in Punjab, India Sowaddi Kalan (India)
- Coordinates: 30.84°N 75.54°E
- Country: India
- State: Punjab
- District: Ludhiana

Government
  - Type: Panchayat

Area
  - Total: 17.37 km^{2} (6.71 sq mi)

Population (2011)
  - Total: 4,609
  - Density: 265.3/km^{2} (687.2/sq mi)

Languages
  - Official: Punjabi
- Time zone: UTC+5:30 (IST)
- PIN: 142025
- Telephone code: 01624
- Vehicle registration: PB-10/PB-25
- Website: www.sowaddi.com

Sowaddi Kalan or Swaddi Khas is a village in Ludhiana district in the Indian state of Punjab. Kalan is Persian language word which means Big. It is one of the most educated villages in the area. Swaddi Kalan is a large village in Jagraon of Ludhiana district with a total of 954 families and 4,804 residents in 2011.

As per constitution of India and Panchyati Raaj Act, Sowaddi Kalan village is administrated by Sarpanch (Head of Village) who is elected representative of village.

== Demographics ==
As of 2011 India census, Sowaddi Kalan had a population of 4,609. Males constituted 2,422 (53%) of the population and females 2,187 (47%).

Swaddi Kalan village had population of 4,804 of which 2,586 were males while 2,218 are females as per Census 2011. The population of children ages 0–6 is 475 which makes up 9.89% of the population of village. The average sex ratio is 858 which is lower than Punjab state average of 895. Child sex ratio for the village as per census 2011 is 703, lower than Punjab average of 846.

Sowaddi Kalan village has a higher literacy rate compared to Punjab. In 2011, the literacy rate was 83.21% compared to 75.84% of Punjab. Male literacy stands at 87.69% while female literacy was 78.09%.

== Transportation ==
Sowaddi Kalan is on Gurah Bharowal Link road. The village had great bus connectivity to Mullanpur and Jagraon. The nearest railway station is Ludhiana and Jagraon. Chanukimaan has a small railway station. The nearby villages are Talwandi Kalan, Talwandi Khurd, Majri, Gurah, Bharowal Kalan and Virk.

== Markets ==
Sowaddi Kalan has a main market in Chardi Pasa and some other shops in Pashmi Swaddi.

== Education ==
The main educational institutions are:

1. Government primary and senior secondary school
2. Akal Academy

== Sports ==
It is famous for its Kabaddi Cup.
