= Sukhdeep Singh (disambiguation) =

Sukhdeep Singh may refer to:

- Sukhdeep Singh (singer), known by his stage name Sukhe
- Sukhdeep Singh Chakria, boxer
- Sukhdeep Singh (cricketer), Kenyan cricketer
