= Mirazizbek Mirzakhalilov =

Uzbek boxer (born 1995)

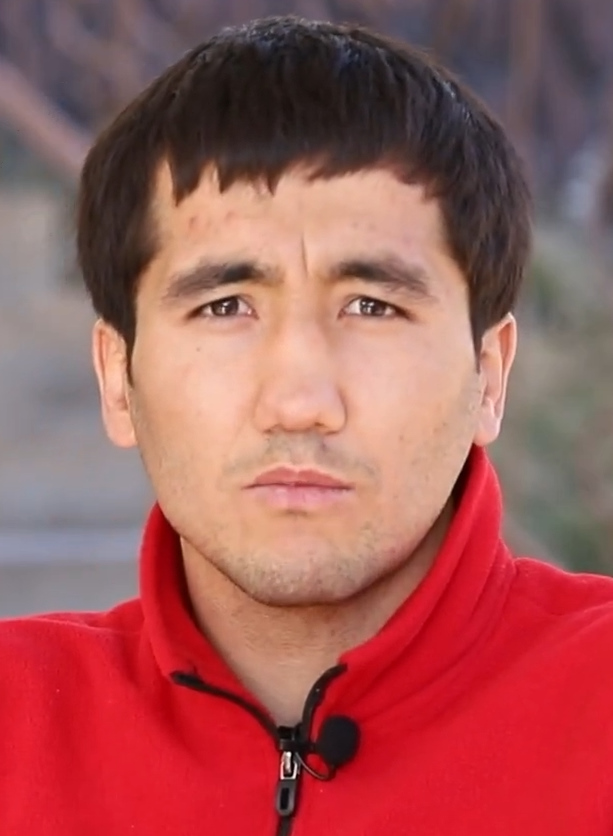
- Mirzakhalilov in 2021

Personal information
- Born: 27 February 1995 (age 31) Quva, Uzbekistan
- Height: 5 ft 6 1/2 in (169 cm)
- Weight: Super-bantamweight

Boxing career

Boxing record
- Total fights: 2
- Wins: 2
- Win by KO: 2
Medal record
Men's amateur boxing
Representing Uzbekistan
World Championships
Gold medal – first place	2019 Yekaterinburg	Featherweight
Asian Games
Gold medal – first place	2018 Jakarta-Palembang	Bantamweight
Asian Championships
Gold medal – first place	2019 Bangkok	Bantamweight
Gold medal – first place	2024 Chiang Mai	Featherweight
Silver medal – second place	2021 Dubai	Bantamweight

Mirazizbek Mirzakhalilov (born 27 February 1995) is an Uzbek professional boxer. As an amateur, he won a gold medal at the 2019 World Championships, 2019 Asian Championships, and 2018 Asian Games.

== Amateur career ==
=== Olympic result ===
Tokyo 2020

- Round of 16: Defeated by Kurt Walker (Republic of Ireland) 4–1

=== World Championships result ===
Yekaterinburg 2019

- Round of 32: Defeated Douglas de Andrade (Brazil) 5–0
- Round of 16: Defeated Mohamed Hamout (Morocco) 4–1
- Quarter-finals: Defeated Kairat Yeraliyev (Kazakhstan) 4–1
- Semi-final: Defeated Erdenebatyn Tsendbaatar (Mongolia) 5–0
- Final: Defeated Lázaro Álvarez (Cuba) 3–2

Belgrade 2021

- Round of 32: Defeated by Jahmal Harvey (United States) 3–2

=== Asian Games result ===
Jakarta-Palembang 2018

- Round of 16: Defeated Mohammad Al-Wadi (Jordan) 5–0
- Quarter-finals: Defeated Kharkhüügiin Enkh-Amar (Mongolia) 3–2
- Semi-finals: Defeated Sunan Agung Amoragam (Indonesia) 5–0
- Final: Defeated Jo Hyo-nam (North Korea) RSCI

== Professional career ==
=== Early career ===
Mirzakhalilov made his professional debut on 3 April 2021 in a bout against Tasha Mjuaji. Mirzakhalilov knocked his opponent down twice on route to a knockout win in the opening round.

== Professional boxing record ==
2 fights	2 wins	0 losses
By knockout	2	0
By decision	0	0

No.	Result	Record	Opponent	Type	Round, time	Date	Location	Notes
2	Win	2–0	Islam Torobaev	RTD	3 (4), 3:00	13 Aug 2022	Humo Arena, Tashkent, Uzbekistan	
1	Win	1–0	Tasha Mjuaji	KO	1 (6), 2:24	3 Apr 2021	Humo Arena, Tashkent, Uzbekistan	
