= Sidhwan Khurd =

Village in Punjab, India

- Village
- Location in Punjab, India Sidhwan Khurd (India)
- Coordinates: 30.828273°N 75.551348°E
- Country: India
- State: Punjab
- District: Ludhiana

Government
  - Type: Panchayati raj (India)
  - Body: Gram panchayat

Population (2011)
  - Total: 836

Languages
  - Official: Punjabi
- Time zone: UTC+5:30 (IST)
- PIN: 142024

Sidhwan Khurd is a village in Jagraon Tehsil in Ludhiana district of Punjab State, India. It is located 36 km towards west from District headquarters Ludhiana. The village is administrated by a Sarpanch who is an elected representative head of village. The postal code of the village is 142024.

== Demographics ==
The population of village is 1657 as per the Population Census of 2011.

Stats of Sidhwan Khurd (as per census 2011)
| Particulars | Male | Female | Total |
|---|---|---|---|
| Total No. of houses | 354 | | |
| Population | 836 | 821 | 1,657 |
| Child (0–6) | 71 | 70 | 141 |
| Schedule Caste | 295 | 284 | 579 |
| Schedule Tribe | 0 | 0 | 0 |
| Literacy | 89.28 % | 83.09 % | 86.21 % |
| Total Workers | 427 | 91 | 518 |
| Main Worker | - | - | 375 |
| Marginal Worker | 122 | 21 | 143 |
