= 2018 AIBA Women's World Boxing Championships – Light heavyweight =

Boxing competitions

Light heavyweight at the 2018 AIBA Women's World Boxing Championships
- Dates: 18–24 November
- Competitors: 14 from 14 nations

Medalists
gold medal	Wang Lina	China
silver medal	Jessica Caicedo	Colombia
bronze medal	Viktoria Kebikava	Belarus
bronze medal	Elif Güneri	Turkey

The Light heavyweight (81 kg) competition at the 2018 AIBA Women's World Boxing Championships was held from 18 to 24 November 2018.

== Draw ==
Round of 16
18 November
(Belarus) Viktoria Kebikava	RSC
(Tajikistan) Gulmira Isroilova
18 November
(India) Bhagyabati Kachari	4
(Germany) Irina Schönberger	1
18 November
(Colombia) Jessica Caicedo	5
(Ukraine) Anastasiia Chernokolenko	0
18 November
(Australia) Caitlin Torrington	0
(Turkey) Elif Güneri	5
18 November
(Poland) Agata Kaczmarska	DSQ
(Russia) Maria Urakova
18 November
(Canada) Marija Curran	0
(China) Wang Lina	5

Quarterfinals
20 November
(Kazakhstan) Fariza Sholtay	0
(Belarus) Viktoria Kebikava	4
20 November
(India) Bhagyabati Kachari	2
(Colombia) Jessica Caicedo	3
20 November
(Turkey) Elif Güneri	3
(Poland) Agata Kaczmarska	1
20 November
(China) Wang Lina	5
(United States) Krystal Dixon	0

Semifinals
23 November
(Belarus) Viktoria Kebikava	1
(Colombia) Jessica Caicedo	4
23 November
(Turkey) Elif Güneri	1
(China) Wang Lina	4

Final
24 November
(Colombia) Jessica Caicedo	0
(China) Wang Lina	5
