= Hans Kalan =

- village
- Location in Punjab, India
- Coordinates: 30.75°N 75.55°E
- Country: India
- State: Punjab
- District: Ludhiana
- Talukas: Jagraon
- Elevation: 237 m (778 ft)

Population (2010)
  - Total: 1,300

Languages
  - Official: Punjabi
  - Regional: Punjabi
- Time zone: UTC+5:30 (IST)
- PIN: 142026

Hans Kalan is a village near Jagraon, Punjab, India. It is 8.8 km from Chowkimann, which is near NH-95. It is 36.6 km from the main city Ludhiana and 11.1 km from Jagraon. Kalan is Persian language word which means Big.

== Culture ==
The people of Hans Kalan belong to Malwa. Punjabi is the local language.

== Transportation ==
By Rail

- Chaunkimann Railway Station 11 km from the village
- Ludhiana Railway Station 39 km from the village
- Local buses and tempos
