= Boxing at the 2018 Asian Games – Men's 56 kg =

Asian Games competition

Men's 56 kg at the 2018 Asian Games
- Venue: Jakarta International Expo
- Date: 25 August – 1 September 2018
- Competitors: 22 from 22 nations

Medalists
gold medal	Mirazizbek Mirzakhalilov	Uzbekistan
silver medal	Jo Hyo-nam	North Korea
bronze medal	Xu Boxiang	China
bronze medal	Sunan Agung Amoragam	Indonesia

The men's Bantamweight (56 kilograms) event at the 2018 Asian Games took place from 25 August to 1 September 2018 at Jakarta International Expo Hall, Jakarta, Indonesia.

== Schedule ==
All times are Western Indonesia Time (UTC+07:00)

Date	Time	Event
Saturday, 25 August 2018	13:00	Round of 32
Monday, 27 August 2018	13:00	Round of 16
Wednesday, 29 August 2018	13:00	Quarterfinals
Friday, 31 August 2018	18:00	Semifinals
Saturday, 1 September 2018	14:00	Final

== Results ==
Legend

- KO — Won by knockout
- RSC — Won by referee stop contest
- RSCI — Won by referee stop contest injury

=== Final ===
Final
Jo Hyo-nam (PRK)
Mirazizbek Mirzakhalilov (UZB)	RSCI

=== Top half ===
Round of 32
Elísio Gaio (TLS)	0
Chatchai Butdee (THA)	5
Majid Al-Naqbi (UAE)	0
Naqeeb Ullah (PAK)	3
Lee Ye-chan (KOR)	5
Chansamone Vilaysack (LAO)	0

Round of 16
Kairat Yeraliyev (KAZ)	0
Chatchai Butdee (THA)	5
Ýakub Meredow (TKM)	0
Jo Hyo-nam (PRK)	5
Nima Dorji (BHU)	2
Naqeeb Ullah (PAK)	3
Lee Ye-chan (KOR)	0
Xu Boxiang (CHN)	5

Quarterfinals
Chatchai Butdee (THA)
Jo Hyo-nam (PRK)	RSC
Naqeeb Ullah (PAK)
Xu Boxiang (CHN)	RSC

Semifinals
Jo Hyo-nam (PRK)	WO
Xu Boxiang (CHN)

=== Bottom half ===
Round of 32
Sunan Agung Amoragam (INA)	5
Laisullah Azizi (AFG)	0
Mario Fernandez (PHI)
Jaafar Abdul-Ridha (IRQ)	KO
Hayato Tsutsumi (JPN)	2
Kharkhüügiin Enkh-Amar (MGL)	3

Round of 16
Sirozhiddin Abdullaev (KGZ)	0
Sunan Agung Amoragam (INA)	4
Jaafar Abdul-Ridha (IRQ)	3
Asror Vokhidov (TJK)	2
Mirazizbek Mirzakhalilov (UZB)	5
Mohammad Al-Wadi (JOR)	0
Kharkhüügiin Enkh-Amar (MGL)	3
Mohammad Hussamuddin (IND)	2

Quarterfinals
Sunan Agung Amoragam (INA)	4
Jaafar Abdul-Ridha (IRQ)	1
Mirazizbek Mirzakhalilov (UZB)	3
Kharkhüügiin Enkh-Amar (MGL)	2

Semifinals
Sunan Agung Amoragam (INA)	0
Mirazizbek Mirzakhalilov (UZB)	5
