= Hanan Al-Zeyoudi =

Emirati boxer

Personal information
- Nationality: Emirati
- Born: 1995 (age 30–31)

Sport
- Country: United Arab Emirates
- Sport: Boxing
Medal record
Representing United Arab Emirates
Asian Amateur Boxing Championships
Bronze medal – third place	2021 Dubai	81 kg

Hanan Al-Zeyoudi is an Emirati boxer.

== Career ==
Her first major international competition was the 2019 Asian Amateur Boxing Championships, after the AIBA allowed competitors to wear a hijab. Along with Fahima Falaknaz, she became one of the first female boxers from the UAE to participate in international competitions.

At the 2021 Asian Amateur Boxing Championships she secured a bronze medal.

She has qualified for the upcoming 2021 AIBA World Boxing Championships.
