= Ram Singh (boxer) =

Indian boxer

Personal information
- Nationality: Indian
- Born: Asmanpur, Patiala, Punjab

Sport
- Sport: Boxing

Ram Singh is an Indian boxer who competes in the heavyweight category. He has represented India in various national and international boxing tournaments. He was previously part of the Indian Army boxing team and later joined the Punjab Police as an athlete.

== Early life and career ==
Singh was born in Asmanpur, Patiala, Punjab, India, to Randhir Singh and Gurmail Kaur. He completed his schooling at Sarkari High School, Nain Kalan, and later attended Sarkari Senior Secondary School, Bhunarheri.

Singh began his sports career in kabaddi in 1998, switched to hurdles in 1999, and later took up boxing in 2002. He won a gold medal at the School National Championship, a silver at the Junior Nationals, and a bronze at the National Games, leading to his selection for the Indian boxing team and recruitment into the Indian Army in Pune.

In 2003, Singh was inducted into the Punjab Police as an athlete. He won five consecutive gold medals at the All India Police Games. Internationally, he won bronze medals in events held in Pakistan (2005), Czech Republic, and Kazakhstan, and participated in the International Boxing Tournament in Durban, Australia, in 2010.

After his acquittal, Singh resumed his professional boxing career in 2016, winning his first professional fight in Bangalore. He was later appointed as the captain of the Mumbai Assassins Team in the Super Boxing League.

== Legal issues and suspension ==
In March 2013, Singh was implicated in a drug-related case in Fatehgarh Sahib and was arrested on 7 April 2013. As a result, he was dismissed from the Punjab Police and sent to Nabha Jail. After securing bail in May 2013, he faced financial difficulties and worked in a tractor workshop before becoming a boxing coach at Public College, Samana. In 2019, he was acquitted of all charges.
