= Porain =

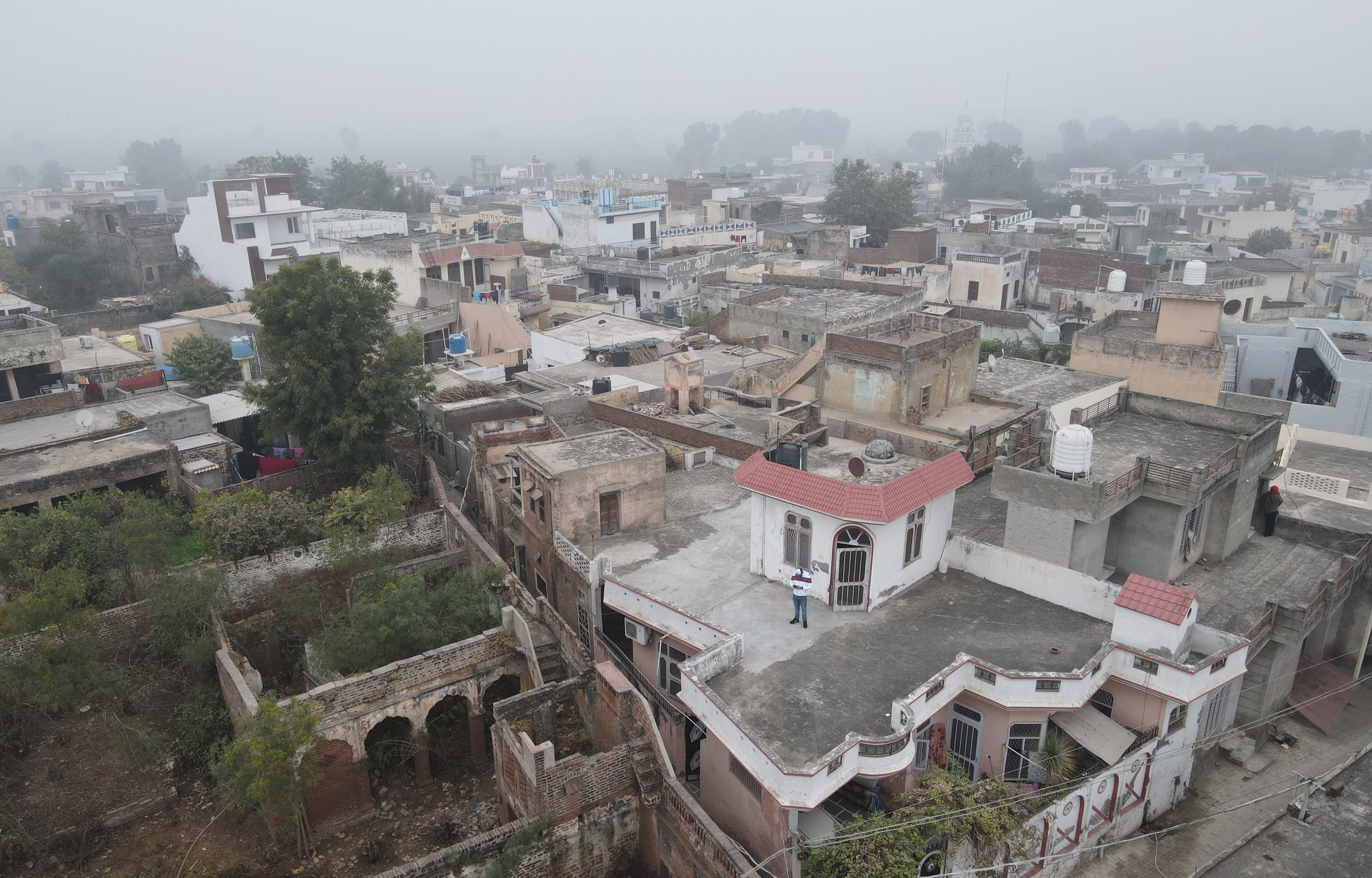

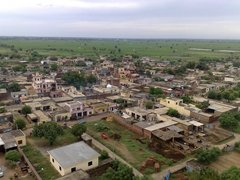

Porain or Purain is a village in Jagraon tehsil, Ludhiana district, Punjab, India. As of the 2011 Census of India, the population was 2,331 people across 494 households.
