= 2017 AIBA World Boxing Championships – Flyweight =

Boxing competitions

Flyweight at the 2017 AIBA World Boxing Championships
- Venue: Alsterdorfer Sporthalle
- Location: Hamburg, Germany
- Dates: 26 August–2 September
- Competitors: 25 from 25 nations

Medalists
gold medal	Yosvany Veitía	Cuba
silver medal	Jasurbek Latipov	Uzbekistan
bronze medal	Tamir Galanov	Russia
bronze medal	Kim In-kyu	South Korea

The Flyweight competition at the 2017 AIBA World Boxing Championships was held from 26 August to 2 September 2017.

== Draw ==
=== Final ===
Final
2 September
(Cuba) Yosvany Veitía	5
(Uzbekistan) Jasurbek Latipov	0

=== Top half ===
First round
26 August
(Botswana) Otukile Mahomed	1
(Philippines) Dannel Maamo	4
26 August
(Israel) David Alaverdian	5
(Australia) Tyler Blizzard	0
26 August
(Spain) Gabriel Escobar	5
(Germany) Hamza Touba	0
26 August
(Barbados) Jabali Breedy	0
(Russia) Tamir Galanov	5
26 August
(Venezuela) Franklin González
(Italy) Manuel Cappai	w/o

Second round
28 August
(Cuba) Yosvany Veitía	5
(Philippines) Dannel Maamo	0
28 August
(Israel) David Alaverdian	1
(Spain) Gabriel Escobar	4
28 August
(Costa Rica) David Jiménez	2
(Russia) Tamir Galanov	3
28 August
(Italy) Manuel Cappai	5
(Ukraine) Dmytro Zamotayev	0

Quarterfinals
29 August
(Cuba) Yosvany Veitía	5
(Spain) Gabriel Escobar	0
29 August
(Russia) Tamir Galanov	5
(Italy) Manuel Cappai	0

Semifinals
1 September
(Cuba) Yosvany Veitía	3
(Russia) Tamir Galanov	2

=== Bottom half ===
First round
26 August
(Japan) Ryusei Baba	2
(India) Kavinder Bisht	3
26 August
(Kazakhstan) Azamat Issakulov	0
(South Korea) Kim In-kyu	5
26 August
(Uzbekistan) Jasurbek Latipov	5
(Puerto Rico) Yankiel Rivera	0
26 August
(Morocco) Abdelali Daraa	1
(England) Niall Farrell	4

Second round
28 August
(Algeria) Mohamed Flissi	2
(India) Kavinder Bisht	3
28 August
(South Korea) Kim In-kyu	5
(Republic of Ireland) Brendan Irvine	0
28 August
(Bulgaria) Daniel Asenov	2
(Uzbekistan) Jasurbek Latipov	3
28 August
(England) Niall Farrell	0
(Colombia) Ceiber Ávila	5

Quarterfinals
29 August
(India) Kavinder Bisht	0
(South Korea) Kim In-kyu	4
29 August
(Uzbekistan) Jasurbek Latipov	4
(Colombia) Ceiber Ávila	1

Semifinals
1 September
(South Korea) Kim In-kyu	0
(Uzbekistan) Jasurbek Latipov	5
