= Simranjit Kaur =

Indian boxer (born 1995)

Personal information
- Full name: Simranjit Kaur Baatth
- Nationality: Indian
- Born: 10 July 1995 (age 31) Chakar, Punjab, India
- Height: 1.69 m (5 ft 6 1/2 in)
- Weight: 64 kg (141 lb)

Sport
- Sport: Boxing
- Weight class: Light welterweight
- Coached by: Ramanand
Medal record
Women's amateur boxing
Representing India
World Championships
Bronze medal – third place	2018 New Delhi	Light welterweight
Asian Championships
Silver medal – second place	2019 Bangkok	Light welterweight
Bronze medal – third place	2021 Dubai	Lightweight

Simranjit Kaur Baatth (born 1995) is an Indian amateur boxer from Punjab, India. She has represented India internationally since 2011. Kaur won a bronze medal for India at the 2018 AIBA Women's World Boxing Championships. She was a part of the Indian women's boxing contingent and won a gold medal at the Ahmet Comert International Boxing Tournament in Istanbul, Turkey in the 64 kg category. Baatth is the first female boxer from Punjab to participate in the Olympics. Simranjit won silver at the 2019 Asian Championships and bronze at the 2018 World Championships. She won gold medal at the Cologne Boxing World Cup in Germany.

== Early life ==
Kaur was born on 10 July 1995 to Kamal Jeet Singh and Rajpal Kaur in Chakar, Punjab, India. Her father who worked at a local grocery store died due to a heart attack in July 2018. Kaur was encouraged by her mother to pursue boxing after her elder siblings were also into boxing.

== Boxing career ==
In 2011, Kaur won a bronze medal at the 6th Junior Women National Boxing Championship in Patiala.

In 2012, she won a bronze and a silver medal at the 4th Inter-Zonal Women National Boxing Championship in Vishakhapatnam and at the 8th Junior Women National Boxing Championship in Patiala.

In 2015, she won a bronze medal at the 16th Senior (Elite) Women National Boxing Championship in New Bongaigaon, Guwahati.

In 2018, she won gold at the Ahmet Comert International Boxing Tournament in Istanbul, Turkey in the 64 kg category, along with Monika and Bhagyabati Kachari who also won a gold medal in the 48 kg and 81 kg respectively.

Kaur was a part of the 10-members Indian squad at the 2018 AIBA Women's World Boxing Championships, held at New Delhi, India and led by Mary Kom. and she went on to win the bronze medal at the Light welterweight category for India.

In 2019, Kaur won a gold medal in the 23rd President's Cup International Boxing Tournament held at Labuan Baju, Indonesia.

Simranjit kaur defeated Raykhona Kodirova of Uzbekistan 4–1 at Asian Boxing Championships in Dubai.

Simranjit Kaur clinched silver after losing her final bout in the women's lightweight (57–60 kg) division at the Asian boxing Olympic qualifiers in Amman, Jordan in March 2020 to qualify for the Tokyo Olympics.
