= Mandi Mullanpur =

- Urban
- Location within Punjab
- Coordinates: 30°36′15.7″N 76°19′3.4″E
- Country: India
- State: Punjab
- District: Ludhiana

Population (2001)
  - Total: 14,607
- Time zone: UTC+5.30 (IST)
- Pin Code: 141101
- Area code: 161

Mandi Mullanpur, also known as Mullanpur, is a town located 18 km from Ludhiana on Grand Trunk Road to Jagraon. The village of Mullanpur is connected to the town of Mandi-Mullanpur via two link roads. On one road there is a Gurudwara (Sikh temple), Mashkiana Sahib (sometimes called Mushkiana Sahib or Baba Saheedan), having historical significance. On the other road there are houses of families who have lived there since Independence [Circa 1950].

== Inhabitants ==
Most of the people living there are farmers and businessmen. The population of Mandi Mullanpur is mainly of India's four main religious groups: Sikhs, Hindus, Muslims, and Christians. Males constitute 53% of the population and females 47%. Mandi Mullanpur has an average literacy rate of 69%, higher than the national average of 59.5%: male literacy is 74%, and female literacy is 63%. In Mandi Mullanpur, 11% of the population is under 6 years of age.
