= Sukhdeep Singh Chakria =

Indian boxer

Sukhdeep Singh Bhatti
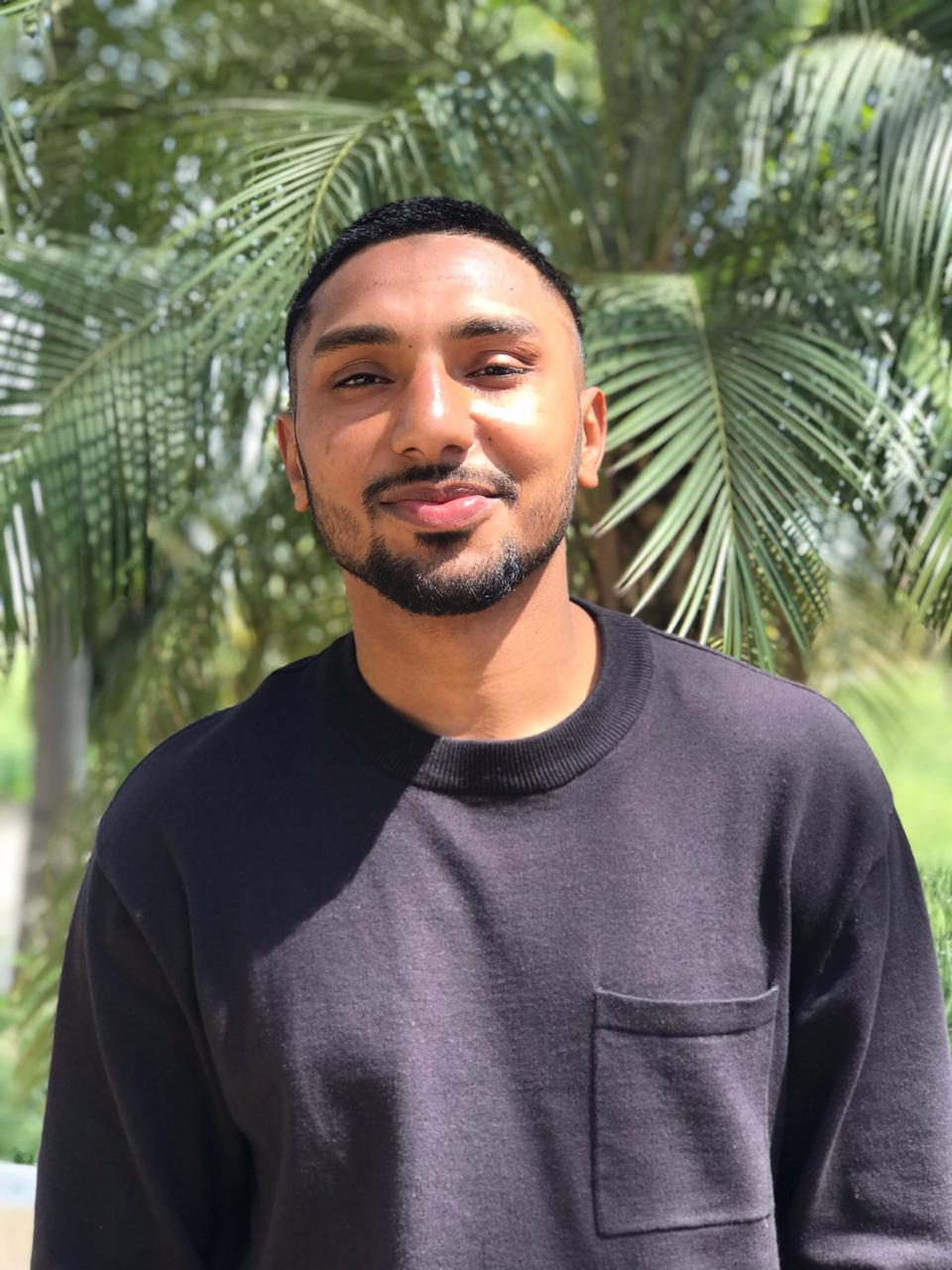

Personal information
- Nickname: Chakria
- Nationality: Canadian
- Born: 25 October 1992 (age 34) Chakar, Punjab, India
- Height: 183 cm (6 ft 0 in)
- Weight: 160 lb (73 kg)

Sport
- Sport: Boxing
- Weight class: Middleweight
- Turned pro: 2018

Sukhdeep Singh Bhatti also known as Sukhdeep Singh Chakria, is an Indo-Canadian professional boxer. He is currently the IBF International Super Welterweight Champion.

He was the gold medalist at Sahara 59th Senior Men National Boxing Championships and Super Cup Inter Zonal men National Boxing Championship at Andheri Sports Complex, Mumbai, India.

Sukhamandeep is currently 19–1 in professional bouts, with eight wins by knockout.

== Early life ==
Sukhdeep Singh Chakria was born on 25 October 1992 in Chakar village in Jagraon, Ludhiana, Punjab.

== Career ==
Year	League/Match	Venue	Result/Medal
2011	18th Senior Men North India Boxing Championship at Gurgaon	Haryana	Silver Medal
2011	5th Super Cup Inter-Zonal Men National Boxing Championship	Maharashtra	Gold
2011	Sahara 58th Senior Men National Boxing Championships	Tamil Nadu	
2012	Sahara 59th Senior Men National Boxing Championships	Hyderabad, Andhra Pradesh	Gold
2012	Training-cum-competition for Senior	Dublin, Ireland	
2013	FXTM International Limassol Boxing Cup	Limassol, Cyprus	Silver
2013	Asian Boxing Championships for Senior Men	Amman, Jordan	Participant
2017	Super Boxing League (Haryana Warriors)	India	

== Professional boxing record ==
20 fights	19 wins	1 loss
By knockout	9	0
By decision	10	1

No.	Result	Record	Opponent	Type	Round, time	Date	Location	Notes
20	Loss	19–1	Uisma Lima	UD	12	12 Dec 2024	Toronto Casino Resort, Toronto, Ontario, Canada	
19	Win	19–0	Lukasz Maciec	SD	12	18 May 2024	Pechanga Arena, San Diego, California, U.S.	Won vacant WBO lightweight title
18	Win	18–0	Gino Natalio Godoy	UD	12	26 Aug 2023	Stadion Wrocław, Wrocław, Poland	
17	Win	17–0	Yaser Yuksel	UD	12	3 Dec 2022	Tottenham Hotspur Stadium, London, England	
16	Win	16–0	Luis Vidales Gutierrez	UD	12	19 Dec 2021	Ice Palace Terminal, Brovary, Ukraine	
15	Win	15–0	Sagar Narwat	TKO	3 (12), 0:35	21 Mar 2021		
14	Win	14–0	Victor Ionascu	RTD	7 (10), 3:00	8 Oct 2020	Equides Club, Lisnyky, Ukraine	
13	Win	13–0	Xhuljo Vrenozi	UD	12	22 Feb 2020	Ice Palace Terminal, Brovary, Ukraine	
12	Win	12–0	Esteban Villalba	UD	12	5 Oct 2019	Ice Palace Terminal, Brovary, Ukraine	
11	Win	11–0	Luca Michael Pasqua	UD	12	20 Apr 2019	Sport Palace, Kyiv, Ukraine	
10	Win	10–0	Jordan Balmir	TKO	7 (12), 2:44	22 Dec 2018	Ice Palace Terminal, Brovary, Ukraine	
9	Win	9–0	Juan Carlos Raygosa	RTD	6 (10), 3:00	23 Jun 2018	Sport Palace, Kyiv, Ukraine	
8	Win	8–0	Richard Holmes	KO	6 (10), 1:53	16 Dec 2017	Ice Palace Terminal, Brovary, Ukraine	
7	Win	7–0	Hector Carlos Santana	TKO	6 (8), 3:00	16 Sep 2017	AKKO International, Kyiv, Ukraine	
6	Win	6–0	David Ezequiel Romero	UD	8	10 Jun 2017	Sporthall Budakalász, Budakalász, Hungary	
5	Win	5–0	Mikhail Miller	UD	8	12 Nov 2016	Ice Palace Terminal, Brovary, Ukraine	
4	Win	4–0	Mitch Louis-Charles	TKO	4 (6), 2:56	23 Apr 2016	Sport Palace, Kyiv, Ukraine	
3	Win	3–0	Gyorgy Mizsei Jr.	TKO	6	12 Dec 2015	Paramount Fine Foods Centre, Mississauga	
2	Win	2–0	Jose Abraham Medina	UD	6	12 May 2018	Hershey Centre, Mississauga	
1	Win	1–0	Alejandro Garcia	RTD	3 (4), 3:00	17 Mar 2018	Hershey Centre, Mississauga	
