= Jessica Caicedo =

Colombian boxer (born 1994)

Personal information
- Born: 13 October 1994 (age 31)

Sport
- Country: Colombia
- Sport: Amateur boxing
Medal record
Representing Colombia
Women's amateur boxing
World Championships
Silver medal – second place	2018 New Delhi	Light heavyweight
South American Games
Silver medal – second place	2018 Cochabamba	Middleweight
Pan American Games
Disqualified	2019 Lima	Middleweight

Jessica Caicedo (born 13 October 1994) is a Colombian boxer. She originally won the gold medal in the women's 75 kg at the 2019 Pan American Games but she was later disqualified after testing positive for a banned substance.

At the 2018 South American Games in Cochabamba, Bolivia Caicedo won the silver medal in the women's 75 kg event. She also won the silver medal in the women's 75 kg event at the 2018 Central American and Caribbean Games. In that same year, Caicedo won the silver medal in the light heavyweight event at the AIBA Women's World Boxing Championships held in New Delhi, India.
