= Sema Çalışkan =

Turkish boxer (born 1996)

Personal information
- Nationality: Turkish
- Born: 24 July 1996 (age 30) Şanlıurfa, Turkey
- Height: 1.75 m (5 ft 9 in)
- Weight: Light middleweight

Boxing career

Boxing record
- Total fights: 56
- Wins: 34
- Win by KO: 0
- Losses: 22
- Draws: 0
- No contests: 0
Medal record
Women's amateur boxing
Representing Turkey
World Championships
Bronze medal – third place	2018 New Delhi	Light welterweight
Bronze medal – third place	2022 Istanbul	Light middleweight
European Championships
Silver medal – second place	2016 Sofia	Welterweight
Silver medal – second place	2018 Sofia	Light welterweight
Bronze medal – third place	2019 Alcobendas	Lightweight
Mediterranean Games
Silver medal – second place	2026 Taranto	Welterweight

Sema Çalışkan (born 24 July 1996) is a Turkish female boxer competing in the Light middleweight (70 kg) division. World championship bronze medalist, two-time European Championship silver medalist. She performed in categories from 60 to 75 kg.

== Boxing career ==
Four-time winner of the national championship in the weight category up to 75 kg (since 2015, 2016) and in the weight up to 69 kg (2017) and in the weight up to 64 kg (2018).

In 2016 she won a silver medal in the category up to 69 kg at the European Championships in Sofia. In the first round, she defeated Croatian Jovana Vučić, and in the quarterfinals she won by unanimous decision against Finnish Elina Gustafsson.

In 2018, in June, she again won a silver medal at the European Championships in Sofia, this time in the category up to 64 kg. In the quarterfinals, she won against Antonia Aksyonova of Belarus 5:0, in the semifinals against Russian Ekaterina Dynnik 3:2. In the final she lost to Bulgarian Melisa Jonuzova 0:5. In November of the same year, she won a bronze medal at the world championships in New Delhi after losing in the semifinals to Ukrainian Mariya Bova 1: 4.

In 2022, in June, she won a bronze medal at the world championships in Istanbul after losing in the semifinals to Irısh Lisa O'Rourke.
