= Dou Dan =

Chinese boxer (born 1993)

Personal information
- Nationality: Chinese
- Born: 20 January 1993 (age 33)
- Height: 1.70 m (5 ft 7 in)

Boxing career
- Weight class: Light welterweight
- Reach: 182 cm (72 in)
- Stance: Orthodox

Boxing record
- Total fights: 6
- Wins: 6
- Win by KO: 0
- Losses: 0
- Draws: 0
- No contests: 0
Medal record
Women's amateur boxing
Representing China
World Championships
Gold medal – first place	2018 New Delhi	Light welterweight
Gold medal – first place	2019 Ulan-Ude	Light welterweight
Asian Championships
Gold medal – first place	2019 Bangkok	Light welterweight
Silver medal – second place	2017 Ho Chi Minh City	Light welterweight

Dou Dan (born 20 January 1993) is a Chinese boxer.

She won a medal at the 2019 AIBA Women's World Boxing Championships.
