= 2019 AIBA World Boxing Championships – Featherweight =

Featherweight at the 2019 AIBA World Boxing Championships
- Venue: Ekaterinburg Expo
- Location: Yekaterinburg, Russia
- Dates: 11–21 September
- Competitors: 51 from 51 nations

Medalists
gold medal	Mirazizbek Mirzakhalilov	Uzbekistan
silver medal	Lázaro Álvarez	Cuba
bronze medal	Erdenebatyn Tsendbaatar	Mongolia
bronze medal	Peter McGrail	England

The Featherweight competition at the 2019 AIBA World Boxing Championships was held from 11 to 21 September 2019.

== Schedule ==
The schedule was as follows:

Date	Time	Round
Wednesday 11 September 2019	15:00	First round
Sunday 15 September 2019	15:00	Second round
Tuesday 17 September 2019	19:00	Third round
Wednesday 18 September 2019	19:00	Quarterfinals
Friday 20 September 2019	19:00	Semifinals
Saturday 21 September 2019	19:30	Final

All times are Yekaterinburg Time (UTC+5)

== Results ==
=== Finals ===
Semi-finals
(Cuba) Lázaro Álvarez	4
(England) Peter McGrail	1
(Mongolia) Erdenebatyn Tsendbaatar	0
(Uzbekistan) Mirazizbek Mirzakhalilov	5

Final
(Cuba) Lázaro Álvarez	2
(Uzbekistan) Mirazizbek Mirzakhalilov	3

=== Top half ===
==== Section 1 ====
First round
(Ukraine) Oleksii Kozolok	1
(Ecuador) Jean Caicedo	4
(Croatia) Raman Ferati	0
(Jordan) Mohammad Al-Wadi	5
(Democratic Republic of the Congo) Nathan Lunata	1
(Moldova) Dorin Bucşa	4
(Philippines) Ian Bautista	5
(Slovakia) Viliam Tankó	0
(Slovenia) Nik Nikolov	0
(Bulgaria) Boyan Asenov	5

Second round
(Cuba) Lázaro Álvarez	5
(Ecuador) Jean Caicedo	0
(Jordan) Mohammad Al-Wadi	2
(Moldova) Dorin Bucşa	3
(Argentina) Mirko Cuello	3
(Philippines) Ian Bautista	1
(Bulgaria) Boyan Asenov	0
(Russia) Albert Batyrgaziev	5

Third round
(Cuba) Lázaro Álvarez	5
(Moldova) Dorin Bucşa	0
(Argentina) Mirko Cuello	0
(Russia) Albert Batyrgaziev	5

Quarterfinals
(Cuba) Lázaro Álvarez	4
(Russia) Albert Batyrgaziev	1

==== Section 2 ====
First round
(China) Chen Zhihao	4
(Japan) Subaru Murata	1
(Finland) Arslan Khataev	3
(Guyana) Keevin Allicock	2
(Switzerland) Tiago Pugno	0
(Azerbaijan) Tayfur Aliyev	5
(South Korea) Lee Ye-chan	3
(Israel) Bishara Sabbar	2

Second round
(India) Kavinder Bisht	3
(China) Chen Zhihao	2
(Finland) Arslan Khataev	RSC
(Saudi Arabia) Faris Al-Mutaani
(Turkmenistan) Ýazmyrat Gurbanow	0
(Azerbaijan) Tayfur Aliyev	5
(South Korea) Lee Ye-chan	0
(England) Peter McGrail	5

Third round
(India) Kavinder Bisht	3
(Finland) Arslan Khataev	2
(Azerbaijan) Tayfur Aliyev	0
(England) Peter McGrail	5

Quarterfinals
(India) Kavinder Bisht	0
(England) Peter McGrail	5

=== Bottom half ===
==== Section 3 ====
First round
(Kyrgyzstan) Munarbek Seitbek Uulu	5
(Belarus) Nikalai Shakh	0
(Australia) Jack Denahy	0
(Denmark) Frederik Jensen	5
(Chinese Taipei) Chen Po-yi	0
(Hungary) Roland Gálos	5
(Armenia) Erik Petrosyan	0
(Canada) Eric Basran	5
(France) Samuel Kistohurry	2
(Colombia) Ceiber Ávila	3

Second round
(Mongolia) Erdenebatyn Tsendbaatar	5
(Kyrgyzstan) Munarbek Seitbek Uulu	0
(Denmark) Frederik Jensen	1
(Hungary) Roland Gálos	4
(Nicaragua) Nilo Guerrero	0
(Canada) Eric Basran	5
(Colombia) Ceiber Ávila	1
(Republic of Ireland) Kurt Walker	4

Third round
(Mongolia) Erdenebatyn Tsendbaatar	5
(Hungary) Roland Gálos	0
(Canada) Eric Basran	0
(Republic of Ireland) Kurt Walker	5

Quarterfinals
(Mongolia) Erdenebatyn Tsendbaatar	5
(Republic of Ireland) Kurt Walker	0

==== Section 4 ====
First round
(Brazil) Douglas de Andrade	3
(Poland) Jarosław Iwanow	2
(Morocco) Mohamed Hamout	5
(Tajikistan) Bakhtovar Sagizov	0
(Thailand) Chatchai-decha Butdee	5
(Indonesia) Jill Mandagie	0
(Dominican Republic) Alexy de la Cruz	2
(Belgium) Vasile Usturoi	3
(Venezuela) Yoel Finol	5
(Germany) Raman Sharafa	0

Second round
(Uzbekistan) Mirazizbek Mirzakhalilov	5
(Brazil) Douglas de Andrade	0
(Morocco) Mohamed Hamout	4
(Lithuania) Edgaras Skurdelis	1
(Thailand) Chatchai-decha Butdee	5
(Belgium) Vasile Usturoi	0
(Venezuela) Yoel Finol	2
(Kazakhstan) Kairat Yeraliyev	3

Third round
(Uzbekistan) Mirazizbek Mirzakhalilov	4
(Morocco) Mohamed Hamout	1
(Thailand) Chatchai-decha Butdee	2
(Kazakhstan) Kairat Yeraliyev	3

Quarterfinals
(Uzbekistan) Mirazizbek Mirzakhalilov	4
(Kazakhstan) Kairat Yeraliyev	1
