= Roshni mela =

Festival of lights in Jagraon, Punjab, India

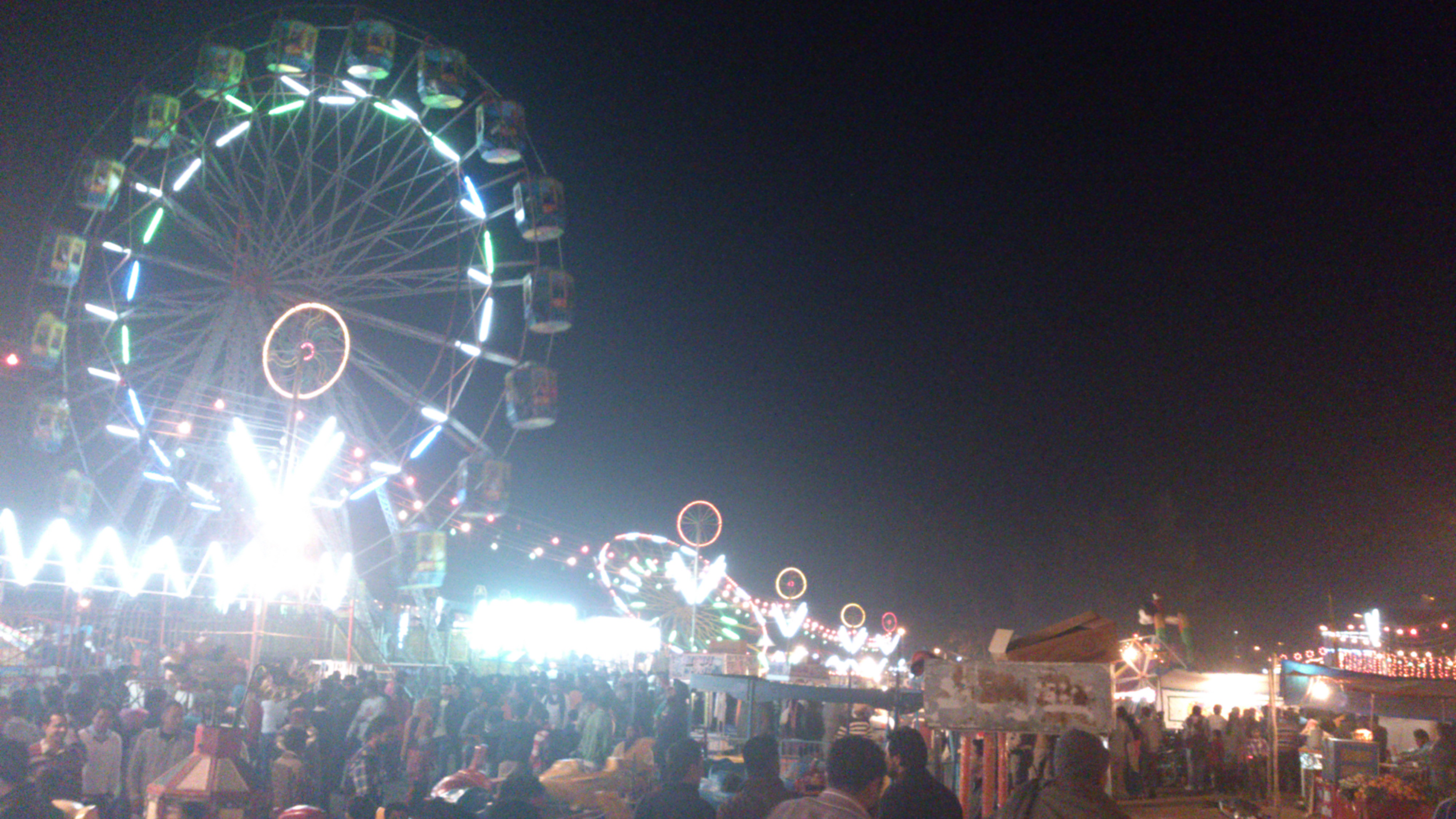
Roshni Mela 25 Feb, 2013

Roshni Mela (festival of lights) is held in Jagraon. The fair is held at the mazar of Peer Baba Mohkumdeen and lasts for three days. Thousands of people from Punjab, Haryana, Uttar Pradesh, Himachal Pradesh and other neighbouring states visit the place, light an earthen lamp at the mazar and pray.

== Celebration ==
The Roshni fair is held from 14 to 16 of Phagan (Punjabi: ਫੱਗਣ) in honour of Baba Mohkam Din. He died in 1913 A.D. Next to his mazar is the Maqbara of Syed Hameeray Shah who was his adopted son: The Khalifa and Mutawalli and Sajjada Nashin of Baba Sahib's Mazar. A celebration on the tomb of his wife named Mai Deena also takes place. The tomb is at a distance of half a mile. Earthen lamps are lit near the tomb of Baba Mohkam Din. Mohkam Din died in February 1913 CE.Next to the Mazar is the Maqbara of Syed Hameeray Shah Sahib who was his adopted son, the great khalifa, Mutawalli and Sajjada Nashin of Baba Sahib. He was initiated by Peer Syed Amin Shah Sahib Naqshbandi of Aloo Mahar Shareef, District Sialkot, Pakistan. Maulvi Mazhar Hassan, Wakeel of Ludhiana was the Sajjada Nashin and the Mutawalli of the Mazar Shareef. In 1947 he migrated to Pakistan. The fair’s attractions include a wrestling competition which is held annually during the Mela and is organised by Sai Mian Meer International Foundation. Also, traditional Punjabi folk songs are sung at the fair.

== History ==
Another Roshni Mela is also held in the city of Ludhiana in honour of Shaikh Abdul Qadir Jilani who is popularly known as Gaus Pak in the Indian subcontinent, and was the patron saint of the Qadiri Sufi order which was founded in Baghdad after his death in 1166 AD. Gaus Pak never came to South Asia but became popular in the country through emigrant Qadiri Sufis.

"The popular iconography of Gaus Pak narrates the story of a woman Rudi who on one occasion forgot to pay her donations towards Gyarvi Sharif. In the same week, it was her son’s wedding and people invited on the wedding ceremony had to ferry across a river. As soon as the ferry took off it started to sink. After watching this happening, the mother had so much depression that for eleven/twelve years she kept wandering in a jungle. One day she met a faithful who queried her about the problem. After hearing the problem, he said asked Rudi to raise her hands and supplicate to Allah. After supplication to Allah the ferry that had sunk around twelve years ago started rising. Everyone except one emerged safe. The friend of Allah asked the woman, “Did you remember to donate generously towards the Gyarvi Sharif?” The woman replied “no”. He told her that she should keep donating generously to Gyarvi Sharif Narrating this tale people strongly recommend celebrations at Gyarvi Shareef on the eleventh day of every month. The story continues to be popular in east Punjab."
