= 2021 Asian Amateur Boxing Championships =

Amateur Boxing Championship

2021 Asian Boxing Championships
- Venue: Le Méridien Dubai Hotel
- Location: Dubai, United Arab Emirates
- Dates: 24–31 May 2021

The 31st edition of the Asian Amateur Boxing Championships was held from 24 to 31 May 2021 in Dubai, United Arab Emirates. It was the second time in the tournament's history that men and women fought in the same championship.

== Medal summary ==
=== Men ===
Event	Gold	Silver	Bronze
Light flyweight (49 kg)	Nodirjon Mirzakhmedov; Uzbekistan	Daniyal Sabit; Kazakhstan	Orkhontungalagiin Önöbold; Mongolia
Light flyweight (49 kg)	Nodirjon Mirzakhmedov; Uzbekistan	Daniyal Sabit; Kazakhstan	Mark Lester Durens; Philippines
Flyweight (52 kg)	Shakhobidin Zoirov; Uzbekistan	Amit Panghal; India	Saken Bibossinov; Kazakhstan
Flyweight (52 kg)	Shakhobidin Zoirov; Uzbekistan	Amit Panghal; India	Azat Usenaliev; Kyrgyzstan
Bantamweight (56 kg)	Kharkhüügiin Enkh-Amar; Mongolia	Mirazizbek Mirzakhalilov; Uzbekistan	Junmilardo Ogayre; Philippines
Bantamweight (56 kg)	Kharkhüügiin Enkh-Amar; Mongolia	Mirazizbek Mirzakhalilov; Uzbekistan	Akylbek Esenbek Uulu; Kyrgyzstan
Lightweight (60 kg)	Erdenebatyn Tsendbaatar; Mongolia	Danial Shahbakhsh; Iran	Abdumalik Khalokov; Uzbekistan
Lightweight (60 kg)	Erdenebatyn Tsendbaatar; Mongolia	Danial Shahbakhsh; Iran	Varinder Singh; India
Light welterweight (64 kg)	Baatarsükhiin Chinzorig; Mongolia	Shiva Thapa; India	Bakhodur Usmonov; Tajikistan
Light welterweight (64 kg)	Baatarsükhiin Chinzorig; Mongolia	Shiva Thapa; India	Elnur Abduraimov; Uzbekistan
Welterweight (69 kg)	Bobo-Usmon Baturov; Uzbekistan	Ablaikhan Zhussupov; Kazakhstan	Vikas Krishan Yadav; India
Welterweight (69 kg)	Bobo-Usmon Baturov; Uzbekistan	Ablaikhan Zhussupov; Kazakhstan	Battömöriin Misheelt; Mongolia
Middleweight (75 kg)	Saidjamshid Jafarov; Uzbekistan	Abilkhan Amankul; Kazakhstan	Eumir Marcial; Philippines
Middleweight (75 kg)	Saidjamshid Jafarov; Uzbekistan	Abilkhan Amankul; Kazakhstan	Shahin Mousavi; Iran
Light heavyweight (81 kg)	Dilshodbek Ruzmetov; Uzbekistan	Meisam Gheshlaghi; Iran	Erkin Adylbek Uulu; Kyrgyzstan
Light heavyweight (81 kg)	Dilshodbek Ruzmetov; Uzbekistan	Meisam Gheshlaghi; Iran	Shabbos Negmatulloev; Tajikistan
Heavyweight (91 kg)	Sanjeet Kumar; India	Vassiliy Levit; Kazakhstan	Rustam Yrysbek Uulu; Kyrgyzstan
Heavyweight (91 kg)	Sanjeet Kumar; India	Vassiliy Levit; Kazakhstan	Sanjar Tursunov; Uzbekistan
Super heavyweight (+91 kg)	Bakhodir Jalolov; Uzbekistan	Kamshybek Kunkabayev; Kazakhstan	Abdulrahman Al-Anzi; Kuwait
Super heavyweight (+91 kg)	Bakhodir Jalolov; Uzbekistan	Kamshybek Kunkabayev; Kazakhstan	Pouria Amiri; Iran

=== Women ===
Event	Gold	Silver	Bronze
Light flyweight (48 kg)	Alua Balkibekova; Kazakhstan	Gulasal Sultonalieva; Uzbekistan	Josie Gabuco; Philippines
Light flyweight (48 kg)	Alua Balkibekova; Kazakhstan	Gulasal Sultonalieva; Uzbekistan	Monika; India
Flyweight (51 kg)	Nazym Kyzaibay; Kazakhstan	Mary Kom; India	Lutsaikhany Altantsetseg; Mongolia
Flyweight (51 kg)	Nazym Kyzaibay; Kazakhstan	Mary Kom; India	Nadeeka Pushpakumari; Sri Lanka
Bantamweight (54 kg)	Dina Zholaman; Kazakhstan	Sitora Shogdarova; Uzbekistan	Sakshi Chaudhary; India
Bantamweight (54 kg)	Dina Zholaman; Kazakhstan	Sitora Shogdarova; Uzbekistan	Erdenedalaigiin Michidmaa; Mongolia
Featherweight (57 kg)	Sitora Turdibekova; Uzbekistan	Vladislava Kukhta; Kazakhstan	Jaismine Lamboria; India
Featherweight (57 kg)	Sitora Turdibekova; Uzbekistan	Vladislava Kukhta; Kazakhstan	Mijgona Samadova; Tajikistan
Lightweight (60 kg)	Rimma Volossenko; Kazakhstan	Huswatun Hasanah; Indonesia	Shoira Zulkaynarova; Tajikistan
Lightweight (60 kg)	Rimma Volossenko; Kazakhstan	Huswatun Hasanah; Indonesia	Simranjit Kaur; India
Light welterweight (64 kg)	Milana Safronova; Kazakhstan	Lal Buat Saihi; India	Mokhinabonu Abdullaeva; Uzbekistan
Light welterweight (64 kg)	Milana Safronova; Kazakhstan	Lal Buat Saihi; India	Noura Al-Mutairi; Kuwait
Welterweight (69 kg)	Valentina Khalzova; Kazakhstan	Navbakhor Khamidova; Uzbekistan	Lovlina Borgohain; India
Welterweight (69 kg)	Valentina Khalzova; Kazakhstan	Navbakhor Khamidova; Uzbekistan	None awarded
Middleweight (75 kg)	Pooja Rani; India	Mavluda Movlonova; Uzbekistan	Marina Volnova; Kazakhstan
Middleweight (75 kg)	Pooja Rani; India	Mavluda Movlonova; Uzbekistan	Mönkhbatyn Myagmarjargal; Mongolia
Light heavyweight (81 kg)	Fariza Sholtay; Kazakhstan	Sokhiba Ruzmetova; Uzbekistan	Saweety Boora; India
Light heavyweight (81 kg)	Fariza Sholtay; Kazakhstan	Sokhiba Ruzmetova; Uzbekistan	None awarded
Heavyweight (+81 kg)	Lazzat Kungeibayeva; Kazakhstan	Anupama Kundu; India	Mokhira Abdullaeva; Uzbekistan
Heavyweight (+81 kg)	Lazzat Kungeibayeva; Kazakhstan	Anupama Kundu; India	Hanan Al-Zeyoudi; United Arab Emirates

== Medal table ==
Rank	Nation	Gold	Silver	Bronze	Total
1	Kazakhstan	8	6	2	16
2	Uzbekistan	7	6	5	18
3	Mongolia	3	0	5	8
4	India	2	5	8	15
5	Iran	0	2	2	4
6	Indonesia	0	1	0	1
7	Kyrgyzstan	0	0	4	4
7	Philippines	0	0	4	4
7	Tajikistan	0	0	4	4
10	Kuwait	0	0	2	2
11	Sri Lanka	0	0	1	1
11	United Arab Emirates	0	0	1	1
Totals (12 entries)		20	20	38	78
