= Kavinder Bisht =

Indian boxer

Kavinder Singh Bisht
Personal information
- Nationality: Indian
- Born: 1 February 1995 (age 31) Panda, Pithoragarh district, Uttarakhand, India

Boxing career
Medal record
Men's amateur boxing
Representing India
Asian Championships
Silver medal – second place	2019 Bangkok	Bantamweight

Kavinder Singh Bisht (born 1 February 1995) is an Indian boxer who competes in the featherweight category.

Bisht won the silver medal in the men's bantamweight category at the 2019 Asian Amateur Boxing Championships, having beaten reigning world champion Kairat Yeraliyev in the quarterfinal.

At the AIBA World Boxing Championships, Bisht was a quarterfinalist in the flyweight category in 2017 and quarterfinalist in the featherweight category in 2019.
