= Kharkhüügiin Enkh-Amar =

Mongolian boxer (born 1992)

Personal information
- Nationality: Mongolia
- Born: 5 August 1992 (age 34) Ulaanbaatar, Mongolia
- Height: 170 cm (5 ft 7 in)

Boxing career
- Weight class: Bantamweight (56 kg)

Boxing record
- Total fights: 2
- Wins: 2
- Win by KO: 2
Medal record
Men's amateur boxing
Representing Mongolia
Asian Championships
Gold medal – first place	2021 Dubai	Bantamweight
Bronze medal – third place	2019 Bangkok	Bantamweight
World Military Boxing Championships
Silver medal – second place	2021 Moscow	Bantamweight
Universiade
Gold medal – first place	2013 Kazan	Flyweight

Kharkhüügiin Enkh-Amar (Mongolian: Хархүүгийн Энх-Амар; born 5 August 1992) is a Mongolian boxer.

== Competitions ==
At the 2013 Summer Universiade Kharkhüügiin Enkh-Amar won the gold medal in the men's 52 kg event after defeating the Olympic medalist and reigning World Champion Misha Aloyan.

He competed in the men's flyweight event at the 2016 Summer Olympics.

At the 2021 Asian Amateur Boxing Championships Kharkhüügiin Enkh-Amar won the gold medal in the men's 56 kg event after defeating the reigning World Champion Mirazizbek Mirzakhalilov.

== Professional boxing record ==
2 fights	2 wins	0 losses
By knockout	2	0

No.	Result	Record	Opponent	Type	Round, time	Date	Location	Notes
2	Win	2–0	Michael Escobia	TKO	4 (6), 1:20	Feb 15, 2025	ASA Arena, Ulaanbaatar, Mongolia	
1	Win	1–0	Shim Ha-nok	TKO	7 (8), 0:22	Jan 13, 2024	Fashion Center Event Hall, Seoul, South Korea	
