= 2019 AIBA Women's World Boxing Championships – Light welterweight =

Light welterweight at the 2019 AIBA Women's World Boxing Championships
- Venue: FSK Sports Complex
- Location: Ulan-Ude, Russia
- Dates: 7–13 October
- Competitors: 15 from 15 nations

Medalists
gold medal	Dou Dan	China
silver medal	Angela Carini	Italy
bronze medal	Ekaterina Dynnik	Russia
bronze medal	Milana Safronova	Kazakhstan

The Light welterweight competition at the 2019 AIBA Women's World Boxing Championships was held between 7 and 13 October 2019.

== Schedule ==
The schedule was as follows:

Date	Time	Round
Monday 7 October 2019	19:00	Round of 16
Thursday 10 October 2019	14:00	Quarterfinals
Saturday 12 October 2019	14:00	Semifinals
Sunday 13 October 2019	After 16:00	Final

All times are Irkutsk Time (UTC+8)

== Results ==
=== Finals ===
Semifinals
(China) Dou Dan	3
(Russia) Ekaterina Dynnik	0
(Italy) Angela Carini	4
(Kazakhstan) Milana Safronova	1

Final
(China) Dou Dan	5
(Italy) Angela Carini	0

=== Top half ===
==== Section 1 ====
Round of 16
(Vietnam) Hà Thi Linh	2
(Scotland) Megan Reid	3

Quarterfinals
(China) Dou Dan	5
(Scotland) Megan Reid	0

==== Section 2 ====
Round of 16
(Algeria) Chahira Selmouni	2
(Tajikistan) Nilufar Boboyorova	3
(Australia) Jessica Messina	0
(Russia) Ekaterina Dynnik	5

Quarterfinals
(Tajikistan) Nilufar Boboyorova	0
(Russia) Ekaterina Dynnik	5

=== Bottom half ===
==== Section 3 ====
Round of 16
(Italy) Angela Carini	4
(India) Manju Bamboriya	1
(United States) Ravven Brown	5
(Colombia) Paola Calderon	0

Quarterfinals
(Italy) Angela Carini	5
(United States) Ravven Brown	0

==== Section 4 ====
Round of 16
(Botswana) Aratwa Kasemang	0
(Kazakhstan) Milana Safronova	5
(Uzbekistan) Maftunakhon Melieva	2
(Bulgaria) Melis Yonuzova	3

Quarterfinals
(Kazakhstan) Milana Safronova	3
(Bulgaria) Melis Yonuzova	2
