= Erdenebatyn Tsendbaatar =

Mongolian boxer (born 1996)

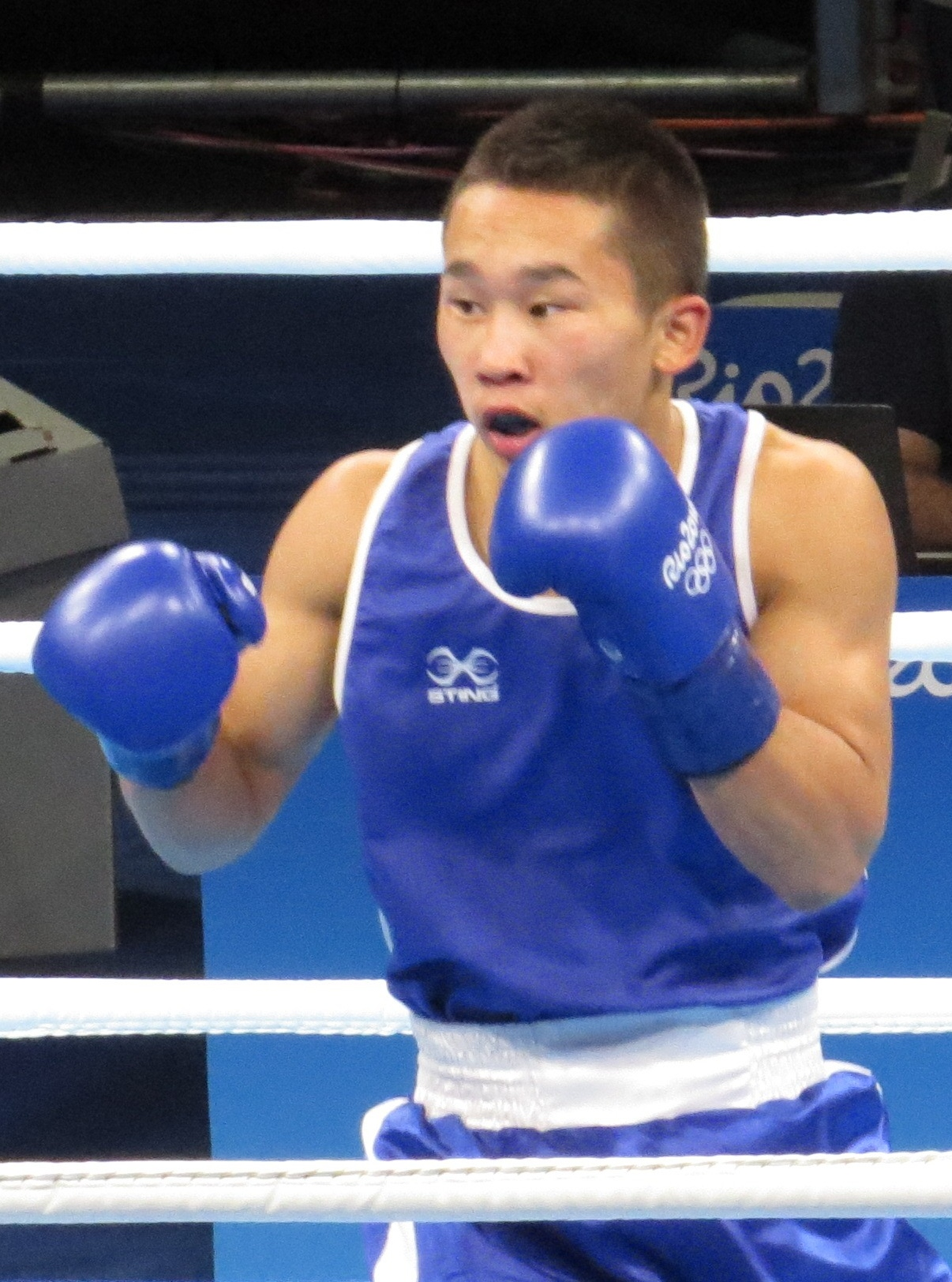
- Erdenebatyn Tsendbaatar at the 2016 Olympics

Personal information
- Nationality: Mongolian
- Born: 16 October 1996 (age 30) Tsetserleg, Mongolia
- Height: 163 cm (5 ft 4 in)
- Weight: 56 kg (123 lb)

Boxing career
- Weight class: Featherweight, Lightweight
- Stance: Southpaw

Boxing record
- Total fights: 16
- Wins: 16
- Win by KO: 6
Medal record
Men's amateur boxing
Representing Mongolia
World Championships
Bronze medal – third place	2019 Yekaterinburg	Featherweight
Asian Games
Gold medal – first place	2018 Jakarta	Lightweight
Asian Championships
Gold medal – first place	2021 Dubai	Lightweight
Gold medal – first place	2019 Bangkok	Lightweight

Erdenebatyn Tsendbaatar (Mongolian: Эрдэнэбатын Цэндбаатар; born 16 October 1996) is a Mongolian boxer. He competed in the bantamweight event at the 2016 Summer Olympics, but was eliminated in the quarterfinals. He won a gold medal at the 2018 Asian Games.

Tsendbaatar won the 2021 Asian Championships in the lightweight event, including the bout against 2018 Youth Olympic Champion and two-time Uzbekistani Senior National Champion Abdumalik Khalokov.

== Professional boxing record ==
16 fights	16 wins	0 losses
By knockout	6	0
By decision	10	0

No.	Result	Record	Opponent	Type	Round, time	Date	Location	Notes
16	Win	16–0	Muhammadkhuja Yaqubov	UD	10	13 Nov 2026	County Coliseum, El Paso, Texas, U.S.	Retained WBC USA super featherweight title
15	Win	15–0	Cobia Breedy	UD	10	1 May 2026	Live! Casino & Hotel Maryland, Hanover, Maryland, U.S.	Won vacant WBC USA super featherweight title
14	Win	14–0	Abraham Montoya	UD	10	21 Nov 2025	FTL War Memorial, Fort Lauderdale, Florida, U.S.	
13	Win	13–0	Humberto Galindo	UD	10	12 Jul 2025	Save Mart Center, Fresno, California, U.S.	Retained WBA Continental North American Gold super featherweight title
12	Win	12–0	Pedro Bernal Rodriguez	TKO	6 (10) 1:56	15 Feb 2025	ASA Arena, Ulaanbaatar, Mongolia	Won inaugural WBA Asia Central lightweight title
11	Win	11–0	Frency Fortunato Saya	UD	10	16 Oct 2024	ProBox TV Events Center, Plant City, Florida, U.S.	Won vacant WBA Continental North American Gold super featherweight title
10	Win	10–0	Alberto Mercado	TKO	3 (8), 2:39	8 May 2024	ProBox TV Events Center, Plant City, Florida, U.S.	
9	Win	9–0	Mohamed Soumaoro	UD	8	28 Feb 2024	Whitesands Events Center, Plant City, Florida, U.S.	
8	Win	8–0	Yohan Vasquez	TKO	8 (8), 2:29	16 Dec 2023	Sony Hall, New York City, New York, U.S.	
7	Win	7–0	Wensong Liu	SD	10	24 Sep 2023	Guangzhou, China	Won vacant WBA Asia super featherweight title
6	Win	6–0	Edy Valencia Mercado	UD	8	27 Apr 2023	Sony Hall, New York City, New York, U.S.	Won vacant NABF Junior super featherweight title
5	Win	5–0	Giovanni Gutierrez	TKO	3 (6), 2:53	23 Feb 2023	Sony Hall, New York City, New York, U.S.	
4	Win	4–0	Rauf Aghayev	TKO	2 (8), 2:53	22 Feb 2022	USC Soviet Wings, Moscow, Russia	
3	Win	3–0	Soslan Baev	UD	8	24 Dec 2021	USC Soviet Wings, Moscow, Russia	Won vacant WBA Asia East super featherweight title
2	Win	2–0	Unknown	TKO	2 (10), 0:40	26 Oct 2019	Shenzhen, China	Won vacant WBC–ABCO Asian Youth lightweight title
1	Win	1–0	Joseph Omana	UD	6	13 Sep 2018	Huanghe S & T University New Gymnasium, Zhengzhou, China	
