= Kanda (surname) =

Kanda refers to three separate surnames, one in Japanese, one in Punjab and one which is common in Zimbabwe. Notable people with the surname include:

Japanese surname

- Sayaka Kanda (1986–2021), Japanese singer, and daughter of Masaki and Seiko Matsuda
- Takeyuki Kanda (神田 武幸; 1943–1996), Japanese anime director
- Tatsunosuke Kanda (神田 辰之助; 1893–1943), Japanese shogi player
- Uno Kanda (born 1975), Japanese model, actress, and TV talent
- Yasushi Kanda (born 1978), Japanese professional wrestler
- Yumemi Kanda (神田 夢実; born 1994), Japanese footballer

Zimbabwean surname

- Mathias Kanda (1942–2009), Zimbabwean marathon runner

== Fictional characters ==
- Sorata Kanda, protagonist of the light novel series The Pet Girl of Sakurasou
- Yu Kanda, a character in the manga series D.Gray-man
- Tsuyoshi Kanda, a character in Yakuza 3
