= Milana Safronova =

Kazakhstani boxer (born 1991)

Personal information
- Nationality: Kazakhstani
- Born: 28 April 1991 (age 35) Saran, Kazakhstan

Boxing career
- Weight class: Light welterweight
- Stance: Orthodox

Boxing record
- Total fights: 5
- Wins: 3
- Win by KO: 0
- Losses: 2
- Draws: 0
- No contests: 0
Medal record
Women's amateur boxing
Representing Kazakhstan
World Championships
Bronze medal – third place	2019 Ulan-Ude	Light welterweight
Asian Championships
Gold medal – first place	2021 Dubai	Light welterweight
Bronze medal – third place	2019 Bangkok	Light welterweight
Bronze medal – third place	2024 Chiang Mai	Welterweight

Milana Safronova (born 28 April 1991) is a Kazakhstani boxer.

She won a medal at the 2019 AIBA Women's World Boxing Championships.
