= Ekaterina Dynnik =

Russian boxer (born 1999)

Personal information
- Nationality: Russian
- Born: 16 June 1999 (age 27) Mezhdurechensk, Russia

Boxing career
- Weight class: Light welterweight

Boxing record
- Total fights: 3
- Wins: 2
- Win by KO: 0
- Losses: 1
- Draws: 0
- No contests: 0
Medal record
Women's amateur boxing
Representing Russia
World Championships
Bronze medal – third place	2019 Ulan-Ude	Light welterweight
European Championships
Bronze medal – third place	2018 Sofia	Light welterweight

Ekaterina Dynnik (born 16 June 1999) is a Russian boxer.

She won a medal at the 2019 AIBA Women's World Boxing Championships.
