= Bhagyabati Kachari =

Indian boxer

Personal information
- Nationality: Indian
- Born: 1 January 1992 (age 34)
- Weight: Light heavyweight (81 kg)

Boxing career
- Stance: Southpaw

Bhagyabati Kachari is an Indian boxer. She won a silver medal at the 9th Nation's Cup boxing tournament held at Sombor, Serbia. She won a gold medal at the 2nd India Open International Boxing Tournament held in Guwahati. She won a bronze medal at the Thailand Open International Boxing Tournament held in Bangkok. She won a gold medal at the 4th Elite Women's National Boxing Championship held in Kannur, Kerala.

== Early life ==
She was born on 1 January 1992 to Deben Kachari and Chaitra Kachari. She hails from Udmari village near Tangla in Udalguri district of Assam. A sports-lover since childhood, Bhagyabati's encounter with boxing was predestined. In Class 6, she learnt football, got involved in volleyball and kabaddi as she reached the high school. However, a school teacher then advised to try boxing as the sport had a promising prospect. While her parents were initially nervous, Bhagyabati's uncle convinced them to let their daughter pursue her dream. In 2009, Bhagyabati joined (Sports Authority of India) in Kokrajhar and since then she has seen a steady rise. She is registered with Boxing Federation of India and an employee of the Indian Railways. She plays boxing through Railways Sports Promotion Board.

== Boxing career ==
Kachari won a bronze medal at the 5th Youth Women National Boxing Championship at Ramhlum Sports Complex, Aizawl in Mizoram in 2009. In 2011, she won two bronze medals at the S.H.N.C. Sharma Memorial Federation Cup Women Boxing Championships 2010–11 in Uttarakhand and at the 12th Senior Women National Boxing Championship in Bhopal.

In 2012, she won a silver medal and a bronze medal at the 13th Senior Women National Boxing Championships in Guwahati and at the Asian Women's Boxing Championships in Ulaanbaatar, Mongolia respectively.

In 2015, she won a silver medal at the 16th Senior (Elite) Women National Boxing Championship in New Bongaigaon, Guwahati.

In 2018, she won gold at the Ahmet Comert International Boxing Tournament in Istanbul, Turkey in the 81 kg category, along with Simranjit Kaur and Monika who also won a gold medal in the 64 kg and 48 kg respectively. She was also presented the ‘Best Technical Boxer Award’ of the tournament.

Kachari is part of the 10-members Indian squad at the 10th Women's World Boxing Championship 2018 being held in New Delhi, India and led by Olympic boxer Mary Kom.

In December 2019, Kachari participated at the 4th Elite Women's National Boxing Championship held in Kannur, Kerala from 2–8 December 2019. She won gold medal in the 81 kg category defeating Shaily Singh by 5–0.

In September 2019, Kachari revealed that thieves broke into her Maligaon residence in Guwahati and stole her boxing medals and commemorative keepsakes from various tournaments.
