= Akal Academy =

Location
- Corporate office: Baru Sahib, Himachal Pradesh (130)Branches in five states (Punjab, Haryana, Rajasthan, Uttar Pradesh, Himachal Pradesh); India; 30.7553029°N 77.2960255°E

Information
- Type: Private
- Motto: World peace through value based education. Schools based on faith and tradition.
- Established: 1986; 40 years ago
- School district: Sirmour
- Superintendent: Neelam Kaur
- Grades: Kindergarten to Class 12th
- Colors: Navy Blue, white
- Communities served: All communities
- Website: www.akalacademy.ac.in

Akal Academy is a chain of co-educational, English-medium, low-cost public schools that follow the Central Board of Secondary Education (CBSE) curriculum. They are affiliated with the C.B.S.E and operate across the rural regions of Punjab, Haryana, Rajasthan, Himachal Pradesh, and Uttar Pradesh. The schools primarily serve students from economically and socially disadvantaged backgrounds and offer admissions irrespective of caste, creed, religion, region, or socio-economic status. Akal Academy operates 130 campuses across India. The flagship campus, Akal Academy Baru Sahib, is located in the Sirmaur district of Himachal Pradesh.

Its 116 locations organize community walkathons across Punjab, Haryana, Uttar Pradesh and Rajasthan, where hundreds of students participate in awareness drives highlighting the harmful effects of drug abuse.
