= Niall Farrell =

British boxer

Personal information
- Nationality: British
- Born: 6 September 1997 (age 29) Birmingham, England
- Height: 5 ft 9 in (175 cm)
- Weight: Flyweight

Boxing career
Medal record
Men's amateur boxing
Representing England
European Championships
Silver medal – second place	2017 Kharkiv	Flyweight

Niall Farrell (born 6 September 1997) is a British amateur boxer who is affiliated with Kingstanding 2nd City ABC.

== Boxing career ==
Farrell won the 2017 Amateur Boxing Association British flyweight title, when boxing out of the Kingstanding 2nd City.

In 2017 he won a silver medal at the European Championships and went to contest the World Championships. Injuries thereafter kept him out of major competitions (including the 2020 Olympic qualifier), but he eventually recovered and earned selection for the World Championships in 2021.
