= Baryar =

Bariar
- Village
- Location in Punjab, India Bariar (India)
- Coordinates: 31.633680°N 75.559693°E
- Country: India
- State: Punjab
- District: Kapurthala

Government
  - Body: Gram panchayat satpal singh

Population (2011)
  - Total: 1,233
- Sex ratio 591/642♂/♀

Languages
  - Official: Punjabi
  - Other spoken: Hindi
- Time zone: UTC+5:30 (IST)
- PIN: 144621
- Telephone code: 01822
- ISO 3166 code: IN-PB
- Vehicle registration: PB-09
- Website: kapurthala.gov.in

Bariar is a village in Bhulath tehsil in Kapurthala district of Punjab State, India. It is located 32 kilometres (20 mi) from Bhulath and 42 kilometres (26 mi) from the district headquarters at Kapurthala. The village is administrated by a Sarpanch who is an elected representative.

== Population data ==
Particulars	Total	Male	Female
Total No. of Houses	279	-	-
Population	1,233	591	642
Child (0–6)	153	90	63
Schedule Caste	263	130	133
Schedule Tribe	0	0	0
Literacy	76.94 %	79.44 %	74.78 %
Total Workers	254	227	27
Main Worker	191	0	0
Marginal Worker	63	56	7

== List of cities near the village ==
- Bhulath
- Begowal
- Kapurthala
- Phagwara
- Sultanpur Lodhi

== Air travel connectivity ==
The closest International airport to the village is Sri Guru Ram Dass Jee International Airport.
