= Super Boxing League =

Professional boxing league in India

- Sport: Boxing
- Founded: 2017
- Founder: Bill Dosanjh, Amir Khan
- First season: 2017
- Owner: Bill Dosanjh
- Motto: Hit Harder
- No. of teams: 8
- Country: India
- Most recent champion: Maratha Yoddhas
- Most titles: Maratha Yoddhas (1 title)
- Broadcaster: Sony ESPN
- Website: Official website

The Super Boxing League was the first professional boxing league in India. British businessman Bill Dosanjh and former boxing champion Amir Khan founded Super Boxing League in 2017 after Super Fight League's first season. The league is organised with the support of World Boxing Council and Professional Boxing Organisation India. The first season had 8 teams comprising both men and women pugilists.

== Teams ==
List of all participating teams.

Team	Location	Owners
Delhi Gladiators	Delhi	Shiva Vij, Varun Jain (N V Group), Sushant Singh Rajput
Haryana Warriors	Haryana	Arun Gupta
Maratha Yoddhas	Pune	Ajeenkya Patil, Riteish Deshmukh
Mumbai Assassins	Mumbai	Nitin Jadhav, Sohail Khan
North East Tigers	Northeast India	Amit Aggarwal, Prakash Johari, Arun Malhotra
OPM Punjab Sultans	Punjab	Deep Malhotra, Sunny Leone, Gauravh Malhotra, Gautam Malhotra
Bahubali Boxers	South India	Mohammed Esa, Vishal Siwappa, Suniel Shetty, Rana Daggubati, Jonaid Bin Tajuddin Mohammed, Shobhu Yarlagadda, Avi Mittal
UP Terminators	Uttar Pradesh	Jaskaran Puniyani and Navraj Jaura, Kanika Kapoor

== Scoring system ==
The Super Boxing League follows a special points scoring system.

Bout outcome	Points awarded
Knockout	6
Technical knockout	4
Decision	3
Draw	1

== 2017 SBL season ==
The first edition of SBL was held from July 7 to August 12, 2017, at Siri Fort, New Delhi. Maratha Yoddhas beat Haryana Warriors to become the inaugural champions. While Sukhdeep Singh of Warriors was the best boxer of the league and Sandeep Chikara of Yoddhas was given the title of best knockout of the league.

== See also ==
- Pro Boxing League
- Super Fight League
