= 2019 Asian Amateur Boxing Championships =

Boxing competitions

2019 Asian Boxing Championships
- Host city: Bangkok, Thailand
- Dates: 19–26 April 2019
- Main venue: Indoor Stadium Huamark

The 30th edition of the Asian Amateur Boxing Championships was held from April 19 to 26, 2019 in Bangkok, Thailand. It was the first time in the tournament's history that men and women fought in the same championship.

== Medal summary ==
=== Men ===
Event	Gold	Silver	Bronze
Light flyweight (49 kg)	Nodirjon Mirzakhmedov; Uzbekistan	Deepak Singh; India	Temirtas Zhussupov; Kazakhstan
Light flyweight (49 kg)	Nodirjon Mirzakhmedov; Uzbekistan	Deepak Singh; India	Mirlan Turkbai Uulu; Kyrgyzstan
Flyweight (52 kg)	Amit Panghal; India	Kim In-kyu; South Korea	Tosho Kashiwazaki; Japan
Flyweight (52 kg)	Amit Panghal; India	Kim In-kyu; South Korea	Hu Jianguan; China
Bantamweight (56 kg)	Mirazizbek Mirzakhalilov; Uzbekistan	Kavinder Bisht; India	Kharkhüügiin Enkh-Amar; Mongolia
Bantamweight (56 kg)	Mirazizbek Mirzakhalilov; Uzbekistan	Kavinder Bisht; India	Ian Clark Bautista; Philippines
Lightweight (60 kg)	Erdenebatyn Tsendbaatar; Mongolia	Zakir Safiullin; Kazakhstan	Shiva Thapa; India
Lightweight (60 kg)	Erdenebatyn Tsendbaatar; Mongolia	Zakir Safiullin; Kazakhstan	Shakurjon Rahimov; Uzbekistan
Light welterweight (64 kg)	Bakhodur Usmonov; Tajikistan	Obada Al-Kasbeh; Jordan	Baatarsükhiin Chinzorig; Mongolia
Light welterweight (64 kg)	Bakhodur Usmonov; Tajikistan	Obada Al-Kasbeh; Jordan	Sanatali Toltayev; Kazakhstan
Welterweight (69 kg)	Bobo-Usmon Baturov; Uzbekistan	Sewon Okazawa; Japan	Ashish; India
Welterweight (69 kg)	Bobo-Usmon Baturov; Uzbekistan	Sewon Okazawa; Japan	Maimaitituersun Qiong; China
Middleweight (75 kg)	Tursynbay Kulakhmet; Kazakhstan	Ashish Kumar Chaudhary; India	Shahin Mousavi; Iran
Middleweight (75 kg)	Tursynbay Kulakhmet; Kazakhstan	Ashish Kumar Chaudhary; India	Nursähet Pazzyýew; Turkmenistan
Light heavyweight (81 kg)	Bek Nurmaganbet; Kazakhstan	John Marvin; Philippines	Narmandakhyn Shinebayar; Mongolia
Light heavyweight (81 kg)	Bek Nurmaganbet; Kazakhstan	John Marvin; Philippines	Erkin Adylbek Uulu; Kyrgyzstan
Heavyweight (91 kg)	Kim Hyeong-kyu; South Korea	Sanjar Tursunov; Uzbekistan	Vassiliy Levit; Kazakhstan
Heavyweight (91 kg)	Kim Hyeong-kyu; South Korea	Sanjar Tursunov; Uzbekistan	Hussein Ishaish; Jordan
Super heavyweight (+91 kg)	Bakhodir Jalolov; Uzbekistan	Kamshybek Kunkabayev; Kazakhstan	Mohammad Mlaiyes; Syria
Super heavyweight (+91 kg)	Bakhodir Jalolov; Uzbekistan	Kamshybek Kunkabayev; Kazakhstan	Satish Kumar; India

=== Women ===
Event	Gold	Silver	Bronze
Light flyweight (48 kg)	Josie Gabuco; Philippines	Kim Hyang-mi; North Korea	Balsangiin Möngönsaran; Mongolia
Light flyweight (48 kg)	Josie Gabuco; Philippines	Kim Hyang-mi; North Korea	Pin Meng-chieh; Chinese Taipei
Flyweight (51 kg)	Pang Chol-mi; North Korea	Nguyễn Thị Tâm; Vietnam	Nikhat Zareen; India
Flyweight (51 kg)	Pang Chol-mi; North Korea	Nguyễn Thị Tâm; Vietnam	Chang Yuan; China
Bantamweight (54 kg)	Shi Qian; China	Huang Hsiao-wen; Chinese Taipei	Myagmardulamyn Nandintsetseg; Mongolia
Bantamweight (54 kg)	Shi Qian; China	Huang Hsiao-wen; Chinese Taipei	Manisha Moun; India
Featherweight (57 kg)	Lin Yu-ting; Chinese Taipei	Nilawan Techasuep; Thailand	Sonia Chahal; India
Featherweight (57 kg)	Lin Yu-ting; Chinese Taipei	Nilawan Techasuep; Thailand	Yodgoroy Mirzaeva; Uzbekistan
Lightweight (60 kg)	Yang Wenlu; China	Wu Shih-yi; Chinese Taipei	Monkhoryn Namuun; Mongolia
Lightweight (60 kg)	Yang Wenlu; China	Wu Shih-yi; Chinese Taipei	Laishram Sarita Devi; India
Light welterweight (64 kg)	Dou Dan; China	Simranjit Kaur; India	Milana Safronova; Kazakhstan
Light welterweight (64 kg)	Dou Dan; China	Simranjit Kaur; India	Maftunakhon Melieva; Uzbekistan
Welterweight (69 kg)	Gu Hong; China	Chen Nien-chin; Chinese Taipei	Dariga Shakimova; Kazakhstan
Welterweight (69 kg)	Gu Hong; China	Chen Nien-chin; Chinese Taipei	Shakhnoza Yunusova; Uzbekistan
Middleweight (75 kg)	Li Qian; China	Seon Su-jin; South Korea	Pak Un-sim; North Korea
Middleweight (75 kg)	Li Qian; China	Seon Su-jin; South Korea	Lin Lee Wei-hsien; Chinese Taipei
Light heavyweight (81 kg)	Pooja Rani; India	Wang Lina; China	Fariza Sholtay; Kazakhstan
Light heavyweight (81 kg)	Pooja Rani; India	Wang Lina; China	Nguyễn Thị Hương; Vietnam
Heavyweight (+81 kg)	Yang Xiaoli; China	Nguyễn Thị Phương; Vietnam	Lazzat Kungeibayeva; Kazakhstan
Heavyweight (+81 kg)	Yang Xiaoli; China	Nguyễn Thị Phương; Vietnam	Erdenesoyolyn Undram; Mongolia

== Medal table ==
Rank	Nation	Gold	Silver	Bronze	Total
1	China	6	1	3	10
2	Uzbekistan	4	1	4	9
3	India	2	4	7	13
4	Kazakhstan	2	2	7	11
5	Chinese Taipei	1	3	2	6
6	South Korea	1	2	0	3
7	North Korea	1	1	1	3
7	Philippines	1	1	1	3
9	Mongolia	1	0	7	8
10	Tajikistan	1	0	0	1
11	Vietnam	0	2	1	3
12	Japan	0	1	1	2
12	Jordan	0	1	1	2
14	Thailand	0	1	0	1
15	Kyrgyzstan	0	0	2	2
16	Iran	0	0	1	1
16	Syria	0	0	1	1
16	Turkmenistan	0	0	1	1
Totals (18 entries)		20	20	40	80
