= ASA Arena =

Event venue in Sükhbaatar, Ulaanbaatar, Mongolia

- Аса Арена
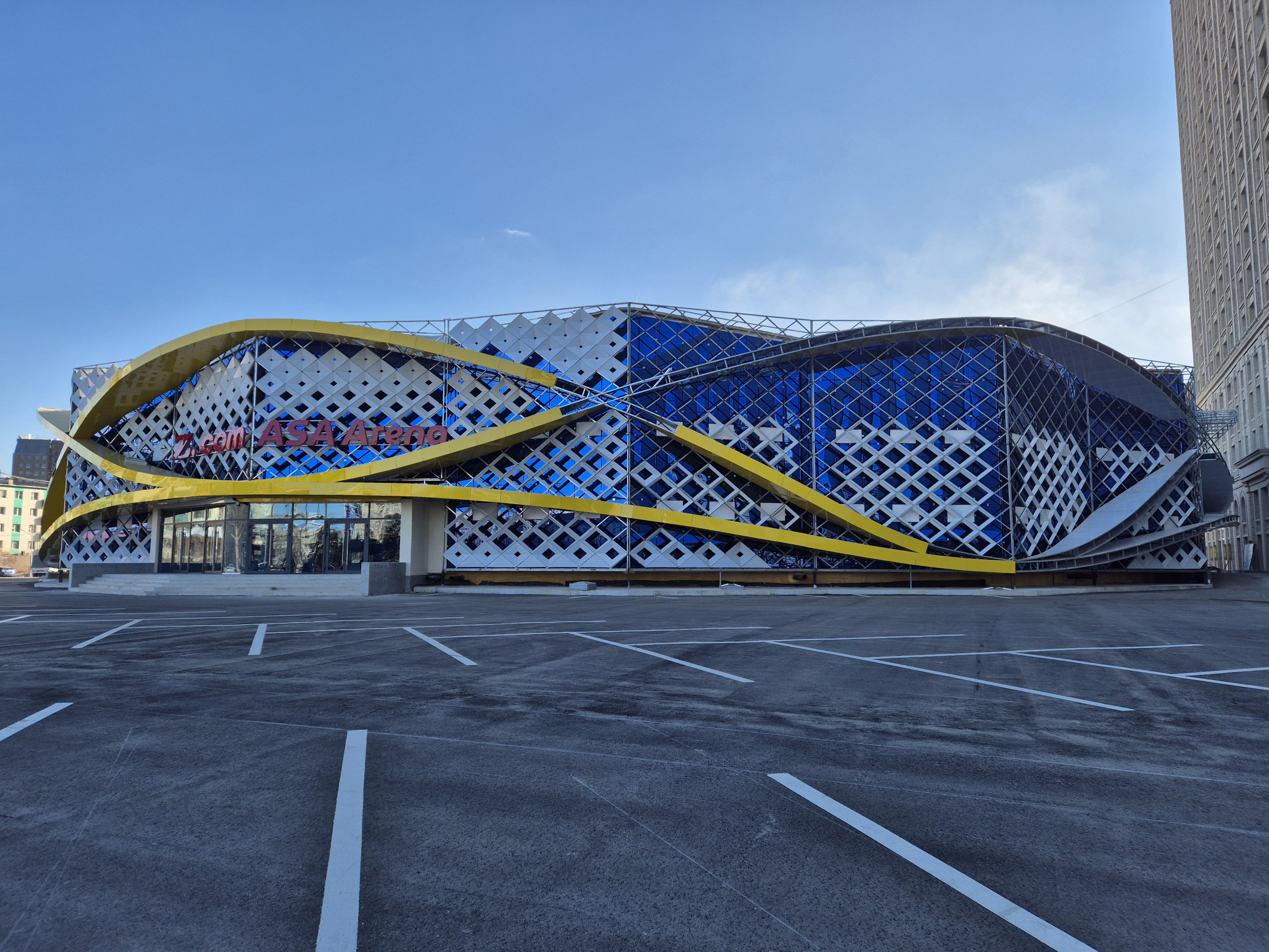
- Interactive map of ASA Arena
- Former names: Mongolian National Circus
- Address: Sükhbaatar, Ulaanbaatar; Mongolia
- Coordinates: 47°54′43.27″N 106°54′26.24″E
- Owner: Asashoryu D.Dagvadorj
- Type: circus

Construction
- Built: 1971
- Renovated: 2020
- Cost: US$7.4 million
- Architect: Ya.Sharkhuu

The ASA Arena (Mongolian: Аса Арена), formerly Mongolian National Circus (Mongolian: Монгол Улсын Цирк), is a circus built in 1971 and event venue established in Sükhbaatar District, Ulaanbaatar, Mongolia.

== History ==
The circus building was built in 1971 with a US$7.4 million loan from Romania. In 2008, the circus was privatized by former sumo grand champion Asashoryu D.Dagvadorj and then renamed the venue as Asa Circus. In 2020, the interior of the circus underwent renovation.

== Controversy ==
After the state circus was privatized and placed under a management contract with Asa Consulting, Mongolian circus performers say they were effectively shut out of the building and have not staged a performance there since. In recent years, foreign circus groups have rented the arena for their shows. The New York Times reported that the new owner's promises to restore the national circus proved empty, and performers have pressed the government to provide more training space without success. The dispute coincides with an exodus of talent. Performers estimate that about 85 percent of their colleagues work abroad, including at least 400 artists in Turkey and 500 contortionists in the United States and Europe.

== Architecture ==
The building's blue dome stood out against the Soviet-era cityscape of Ulaanbaatar, and the facility could seat thousands more spectators than the circus's earlier home. The shape of the circus building resembles traditional round hat worn by women in Ulaanbaatar. The building was designed by architect Ya.Sharkhuu.

== See also ==
- Culture of Mongolia
