= Chakar, India =

Chakar
- village
- Location in Punjab, India Chakar (India)
- Coordinates: 30.643°N 75.394°E
- Country: India
- State: Punjab
- District: Ludhiana
- Talukas: Jagraon
- Elevation: 233 m (764 ft)

Population (2010)
  - Total: 11,000

Languages
  - Official: Punjabi
  - Regional: Punjabi
- Time zone: UTC+5:30 (IST)
- PIN: 142035
- Website: www.chakarindia.in

Chakar is a village in the Jagraon tehsil of Ludhiana district in Indian Punjab. It is located on the Guru Gobind Singh Marg. The sixth Sikh guru, Guru Hargobind Sahib visited this place in 1631 during his tour of Malwa region and the tenth master, Guru Gobind Singh in 1705 after the battle of Chamkaur Sahib

== Geography ==
Chakar is located at 30°38'37"N 75°23'48"E with average elevation of 234 metres. Nearby villages include Mallah, Minia, Kussa, Rama, Hathure, Lakha and Manuke. Near Cities are Jagraon :22 km, Raikot :24 km, Moga :33 km, Nakodar :56 km, Ludhiana :63 km and near AirPorts are Ludhiana Airport :70 km, Raja Sansi Airport :151 km, Chandigarh Airport :161 km, Pathankot Airport :193 km.

== Culture ==
People belongs to Malwa culture. Punjabi is the mother tongue as well as the official language here.

=== Religion ===
The village is predominated by the Sikhs, the follower of Sikhism with Hindu and Muslim minorities.

The gurudwara, Guru Sar Patshahi Chhevin and Patshahi Dasvin, constructed in the 1970s, is located at the northwestern corner of the village. It was constructed in the '70s in memory of the two Sikh gurus, Guru Hargobind Sahib and Guru Gobind Singh who visited the place in 1631 and 1705, respectively. The Gurdwara is managed by the Shiromani Gurdwara Parbandhak Committee through a village committee.

There is a Mandir and a Mosque as the worship site for Hindu and Muslims.

== Sports academy ==
Sher-E-Punjab Sports Academy and Welfare Club was established in 2005 and government registered in October 2007. Boxing, football, athletics and kabaddi are the most played sports.

== Sewage unit ==
Implementation of the sewerage system was first started in 2011. The installation of a sewerage system marks a milestone in the history of developing Chakar.
