= Jagraon =

- Town
- Gurudwara Nanaksar, a gurdwara built as a memorial for the saint, Nand Singh

- Location in Punjab, India Jagraon (India)
- Coordinates: 30.78°N 75.48°E
- Country: India
- State: Punjab
- District: Ludhiana

Government
  - MLA (Member Legislative Assembly): Saravjit Kaur Manuke AAP
- Elevation: 234 m (768 ft)

Population (2001)
  - Total: 65,240
- Time zone: UTC+5:30 (IST)
- PIN: 142026
- Telephone code: +91 1624
- Vehicle registration: PB 25

Jagraon is a city and a municipal council, a rural police district and a sub-division of the Ludhiana district in the Indian state of Punjab. Jagraon is more than three centuries old. Jagraon is at almost the geographical center of the state, 16 kilometres (9.9 mi) from the Satluj River. It is 37 km (23 mi) from its district headquarters Ludhiana, 29 km (18 mi) from Moga, 31 km (19 mi) from Nakodar and 54 miles from Barnala.

== Etymology ==
Jagraon's original name was Jagar aon, meaning "a place of great flooding", as the region historically experienced flooding. The suffix -graon is derived from the Sanskrit word grama, meaning "village".

== History ==
Guru Hargobind visited the Jagraon region of Malwa in western Ludhiana and a Gurdwara called 'Guru Sar' was constructed in the village of Kaunke, located 7 km southwest of the city of Jagraon itself, to commemorate his visit to the locality between the years 1631–1632. Jagraon was established by Rai Kamaluddin of Raikot in 1688. In 1790, Rai Ahmad of Jagraon was arrested by the Maratha general Ranee Khan after the Diwan of Patiala State, Nanu Mal, failed to pay a promised payment for protection. However, Rai Ahmad managed to escape at Panipat via scheming.

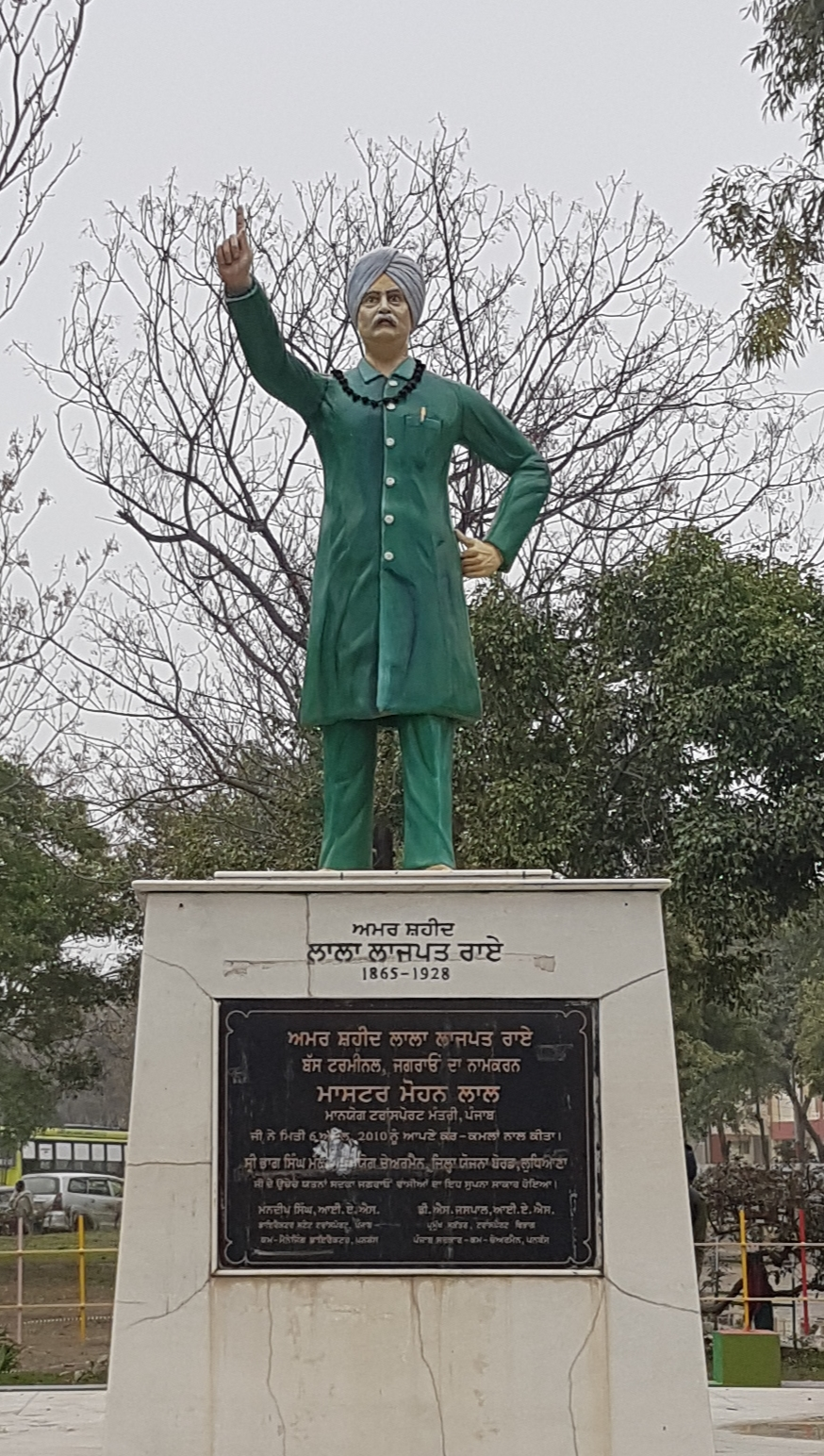
Lala Lajpat Rai Statue, Bus Stand, Jagraon

Jagraon is the home of Lala Lajpat Rai, a well-known figure in the Indian Independence movement, who greatly influenced Bhagat Singh. His house is now a municipal library. The chiefs of Jagraon, according to Major Charles Francis Massy's Chiefs and Families of Note in the Punjab, were Chandravanshi Rajputs, the last being Rai Inayat Khan, the custodian of Guru Sahib's Ganga Sagar at the time of the Partition of India in 1947. Rai Aziz Ullah Khan ex-MP (MNA) in Pakistan is the grandson of Rai Inayat Khan. Soldier Havildar Ishar Singh, who fought the Battle of Saragarhi in 1897, was also a native of Jagraon.

== Festivals ==
Jagraon is most famous for Roshni Mela which is held at the mazar of Peer Baba Mohkumdeen. This event sees the attendance of thousands of people from all over Punjab, Haryana, Uttar Pradesh, Himachal Pradesh

== Geography and connectivity ==
Jagraon is located at 30.78°N 75.48°E. It has an average elevation of 234 metres (768 ft).

== Demographics ==
According to the 2001 Indian census, Jagraon had a population of 60,106. Males constituted 53% of the population and females 47%. Jagraon had an average literacy rate of 68%, higher than the national average of 59.5%: male literacy is 71%, and female literacy is 65%. In Jagraon, 11% of the population was under 6 years of age.

The table below shows the population of different religious groups in Jagraon city and their gender ratio, as of 2011 census.

Population by religious groups in Jagraon city, 2011 census
Religion	Total	Female	Male	Gender ratio
Sikh	34,828	16,670	18,158	918
Hindu	28,501	13,314	15,187	876
Muslim	870	364	506	719
Jain	529	258	271	952
Christian	237	118	119	991
Buddhist	14	5	9	555
Other religions	74	36	38	947
Not stated	187	88	99	888
Total	65,240	30,853	34,387	889

== See also ==
- Akhara
- Chakar
- Ghalab
- Ludhiana
- Mullanpur Dakha
- Sujapur village
- S. Govt. College of Science Education and Research
