= 2022 IBA Women's World Boxing Championships – Bantamweight =

Bantamweight at the 2022 IBA Women's World Boxing Championships
- Venue: Başakşehir Youth and Sports Facility
- Location: Istanbul, Turkey
- Dates: 9–20 May
- Competitors: 34 from 34 nations

Medalists
gold medal	Hatice Akbaş	Turkey
silver medal	Lăcrămioara Perijoc	Romania
bronze medal	Dina Zholaman	Kazakhstan
bronze medal	Preedakamon Tintabthai	Thailand

The Bantamweight competition at the 2022 IBA Women's World Boxing Championships was held from 9 to 20 May 2022.

== Results ==
=== Finals ===
Semi-finals
(Romania) Lăcrămioara Perijoc	4
(Kazakhstan) Dina Zholaman	1
(Thailand) Preedakamon Tintabthai	0
(Turkey) Hatice Akbaş	5

Final
(Romania) Lăcrămioara Perijoc	2
(Turkey) Hatice Akbaş	3

=== Top half ===
==== Section 1 ====
First round fights

	Score	
Estéfani Almánzar (Dominican Republic)	RSC	(South Africa) Lethokuhle Sibisi

Round of 32
(Sierra Leone) Sara Haghighat-joo	0
(Dominican Republic) Estéfani Almánzar	5
(Italy) Sirine Charaabi	5
(South Korea) Jin Hye-jeong	0
(Republic of Ireland) Niamh Fay	RSC
(Democratic Republic of the Congo) Modestine Munga
(Chinese Taipei) Huang Hsiao-wen	1
(Romania) Lăcrămioara Perijoc	4

Round of 16
(Dominican Republic) Estéfani Almánzar	4
(Italy) Sirine Charaabi	1
(Republic of Ireland) Niamh Fay	2
(Romania) Lăcrămioara Perijoc	3

Quarterfinals
(Dominican Republic) Estéfani Almánzar	1
(Romania) Lăcrămioara Perijoc	4

==== Section 2 ====
Round of 32
(Senegal) Dieynabou Diallo
(Uzbekistan) Nozimakhon Bulturova	w/o
(France) Caroline Cruveillier	0
(Serbia) Jelena Zekić	5
(Kazakhstan) Dina Zholaman	5
(Spain) Mamen Madueño	0
(Australia) Rachael Kavanagh	0
(Canada) Scarlett Delgado	5

Round of 16
(Uzbekistan) Nozimakhon Bulturova	0
(Serbia) Jelena Zekić	5
(Kazakhstan) Dina Zholaman	4
(Canada) Scarlett Delgado	1

Quarterfinals
(Serbia) Jelena Zekić	0
(Kazakhstan) Dina Zholaman	5

=== Bottom half ===
==== Section 3 ====
Round of 32
(Colombia) Valeria Arboleda	1
(Japan) Satsuki Yoshizawa	4
(Thailand) Preedakamon Tintabthai	5
(Morocco) Zohra Ez-Zahraoui	0
(Mexico) Gloria Fernández
(Mongolia) Oyuntsetsegiin Yesügen	RSC
(India) Shiksha Narwal	5
(Argentina) Milagros Herrera	0

Round of 16
(Japan) Satsuki Yoshizawa	0
(Thailand) Preedakamon Tintabthai	5
(Mongolia) Oyuntsetsegiin Yesügen	3
(India) Shiksha Narwal	2

Quarterfinals
(Thailand) Preedakamon Tintabthai	3
(Mongolia) Oyuntsetsegiin Yesügen	2

==== Section 4 ====
First round fights

	Score	
Shera Patricio (United States)	w/o	(Bulgaria) Stanimira Petrova

Round of 32
(Armenia) Ekaterina Sycheva	3
(Ukraine) Svitlana Umanska	2
(Germany) Zeina Nassar	0
(Turkey) Hatice Akbaş	5
(Poland) Wiktoria Rogalińska	5
(Kenya) Amina Faki	0
(Bulgaria) Stanimira Petrova	5
(Puerto Rico) Angelyris López	0

Round of 16
(Armenia) Ekaterina Sycheva	0
(Turkey) Hatice Akbaş	5
(Poland) Wiktoria Rogalińska	0
(Bulgaria) Stanimira Petrova	5

Quarterfinals
(Turkey) Hatice Akbaş	5
(Bulgaria) Stanimira Petrova	0
