= Boxing at the 2022 Asian Games – Women's 54 kg =

Boxing competitions

Women's 54 kg at the 2022 Asian Games
- Venue: Hangzhou Gymnasium
- Date: 24 September – 4 October 2023
- Competitors: 15 from 15 nations

Medalists
gold medal	Pang Chol-mi	North Korea
silver medal	Chang Yuan	China
bronze medal	Preeti Pawar	India
bronze medal	Nigina Uktamova	Uzbekistan

The women's 54 kilograms event at the 2018 Asian Games took place from 24 September to 4 October 2023 at Hangzhou Gymnasium, Hangzhou, China.

The competition was a straight single-elimination tournament. Both semifinal losers were awarded bronze medals. Pang Chol-mi of North Korea won the gold medal.

== Schedule ==
All times are China Standard Time (UTC+08:00)

Date	Time	Event
Sunday, 24 September 2023	14:00	Preliminaries – R16
Saturday, 30 September 2023	14:00	Quarterfinals
Tuesday, 3 October 2023	14:00	Semifinals
Wednesday, 4 October 2023	14:00	Final

== Results ==
Legend

- RSC — Won by referee stop contest

Preliminaries – R16
Preeti Pawar (IND)	RSC
Silina Al-Hasanat (JOR)
Huang Hsiao-wen (TPE)	5
Möngöntsetsegiin Enkhjargal (MGL)	0
Chang Yuan (CHN)	3
Jutamas Jitpong (THA)	2
Pang Chol-mi (PRK)	5
Im Ae-ji (KOR)	0
Nigora Olimova (TJK)	0
Nguyễn Thị Ngọc Trân (VIE)	5
Nigina Uktamova (UZB)	5
Irish Magno (PHI)	0
Minu Gurung (NEP)	0
Rinka Kinoshita (JPN)	5

Quarterfinals
Zhaina Shekerbekova (KAZ)	1
Preeti Pawar (IND)	4
Huang Hsiao-wen (TPE)	0
Chang Yuan (CHN)	5
Pang Chol-mi (PRK)	5
Nguyễn Thị Ngọc Trân (VIE)	0
Nigina Uktamova (UZB)	5
Rinka Kinoshita (JPN)	0

Semifinals
Preeti Pawar (IND)	0
Chang Yuan (CHN)	5
Pang Chol-mi (PRK)	5
Nigina Uktamova (UZB)	0

Final
Chang Yuan (CHN)	2
Pang Chol-mi (PRK)	3
