= Boxing at the 2024 Summer Olympics – Women's 54 kg =

Women's 54 kg at the Games of the XXXIII Olympiad
- Boxing pictogram
- Venue: Arena Paris Nord (preliminary); Stade Roland Garros (semifinals and finals)
- Dates: 27 July – 8 August 2024
- Competitors: 22 from 22 nations

Medalists
1st place, gold medalist(s)		Chang Yuan	China
2nd place, silver medalist(s)		Hatice Akbaş	Turkey
3rd place, bronze medalist(s)		Pang Chol-mi	North Korea
3rd place, bronze medalist(s)		Im Ae-ji	South Korea

The women's 54 kg (bantamweight) boxing event at the 2024 Summer Olympics took place between 27 July and 8 August 2024. Preliminary boxing matches occurred at Arena Paris Nord in Villepinte, with the medal rounds (semifinals and finals) staged at Stade Roland Garros.

== Background ==
This was the first ever appearance of women's 54kg.

Chang Yuan became the first ever winner in this category by beating Hatice Akbaş. Korean boxers Im Ae-ji and Pang Chol-mi won the bronze medals.

== Qualification ==
Each NOC could send one boxer to the event.

== Competition format ==
Like all Olympic boxing events, the competition was a straight single-elimination tournament. The competition began with a preliminary round, where the number of competitors was reduced to 16, and concluded with a final. As there were fewer than 32 boxers in the competition, a number of boxers received a bye through the preliminary round. Both semi-final losers were awarded bronze medals.

Bouts consisted of three three-minute rounds with a one-minute break between rounds. A boxer may win by knockout or by points. Scoring was on the "10-point-must," with five judges scoring each round. Judges consider "number of blows landed on the target areas, domination of the bout, technique and tactical superiority and competitiveness." Each judge determined a winner for each round, who received 10 points for the round, and assigned the round's loser a number of points between seven and nine based on performance. The judge's scores for each round were added to give a total score for that judge. The boxer with the higher score from a majority of the judges was the winner.

== Schedule ==
The schedule was as follows.

Legend

R32	Round of 32	R16	Round of 16	QF	Quarter-Finals	SF	Semi-Finals	F	Final

Jul 27	Jul 28	Jul 29	Jul 30	Jul 31	Aug 1	Aug 2	Aug 3	Aug 4	Aug 5	Aug 6	Aug 7	Aug 8
R32			R16		QF			SF				F

== Draw ==
The draw was held on 25 July 2024.

== Seeds ==
The seeds were released on 25 July 2024.

1. Stanimira Petrova (BUL) (quarterfinals)
2. Yeni Arias (COL) (quarterfinals)
3. Tiana Echegaray (AUS) (round of 16)
4. Pang Chol-mi (PRK) (semifinals)
5. Widad Bertal (MAR) (quarterfinals)
6. Lăcrămioara Perijoc (ROU) (round of 16)
7. Tatiana Chagas (BRA) (round of 16)
8. Chang Yuan (CHN) (champion)

== Results ==
=== Finals ===
Final
8 August
Chang Yuan (CHN)	5
Hatice Akbaş (TUR)	0

=== Top half ===
Round of 32
27 July
Huang Hsiao-wen (TPE)	5
Bojana Gojković (MNE)	0
27 July
Jutamas Jitpong (THA)	4
Sara Ćirković (SRB)	1
27 July
Nigina Uktamova (UZB)	w/o
Yomna Ayyad (EGY)

Round of 16
30 July
Stanimira Petrova (BUL)	4
Huang Hsiao-wen (TPE)	1
30 July
Jennifer Lehane (IRL)	0
Chang Yuan (CHN)	5
30 July
Widad Bertal (MAR)	3
Jutamas Jitpong (THA)	2
30 July
Nigina Uktamova (UZB)	0
Pang Chol-mi (PRK)	5

Quarterfinals
1 August
Stanimira Petrova (BUL)	1
Chang Yuan (CHN)	4
1 August
Widad Bertal (MAR)	0
Pang Chol-mi (PRK)	4

Semifinals
4 August
Chang Yuan (CHN)	3
Pang Chol-mi (PRK)	2

=== Bottom half ===
Round of 32
27 July
Charley Davison (GBR)	2
Hatice Akbaş (TUR)	3
27 July
Möngöntsetsegiin Enkhjargal (MGL)	5
Sirine Charaabi (ITA)	0
27 July
Preeti Pawar (IND)	5
Võ Thị Kim Ánh (VIE)	0

Round of 16
30 July
Tiana Echegaray (AUS)	0
Hatice Akbaş (TUR)	5
30 July
Möngöntsetsegiin Enkhjargal (MGL)	4
Lăcrămioara Perijoc (ROU)	1
30 July
Tatiana Chagas (BRA)	1
Im Ae-ji (KOR)	4
30 July
Preeti Pawar (IND)	2
Yeni Arias (COL)	3

Quarterfinals
1 August
Hatice Akbaş (TUR)	5
Möngöntsetsegiin Enkhjargal (MGL)	0
1 August
Im Ae-ji (KOR)	3
Yeni Arias (COL)	2

Semifinals
4 August
Hatice Akbaş (TUR)	3
Im Ae-ji (KOR)	2
