= 2023 IBA Women's World Boxing Championships – Flyweight =

Flyweight at the 2023 IBA Women's World Boxing Championships
- Venue: K. D. Jadhav Indoor Hall
- Location: New Delhi, India
- Dates: 16–25 March
- Competitors: 30 from 30 nations

Medalists
gold medal	Wu Yu	China
silver medal	Sirine Charaabi	Italy
bronze medal	Yuliya Apanasovich	Belarus
bronze medal	Rinka Kinoshita	Japan

The Flyweight competition at the 2023 IBA Women's World Boxing Championships was held between 16 and 25 March 2023.

== Results ==
=== Finals ===
Semi-finals
(Belarus) Yuliya Apanasovich	0
(China) Wu Yu	5
(Italy) Sirine Charaabi	4
(Japan) Rinka Kinoshita	1

Final
(China) Wu Yu	5
(Italy) Sirine Charaabi	0

=== Top half ===
==== Section 1 ====
Round of 32
(Dominican Republic) Miguelina Hernández	3
(Nepal) Anjani Teli	4
(Uzbekistan) Feruza Kazakova	5
(South Korea) Jung Joo-hyung	0
(Belarus) Yuliya Apanasovich	4
(Romania) Alexandra Gheorghe	1

Round of 16
(Haiti) Kathreen Sterling	0
(Nepal) Anjani Teli	5
(Uzbekistan) Feruza Kazakova	3
(Belarus) Yuliya Apanasovich	4

Quarterfinals
(Nepal) Anjani Teli	0
(Belarus) Yuliya Apanasovich	5

==== Section 2 ====
Round of 32
(Kazakhstan) Zhazira Urakbayeva	RSC
(Chinese Taipei) Chang Chia-hsun
(Colombia) María Martínez	0
(India) Sakshi Chaudhary	5
(Greece) Antonia Giannakopoulou	0
(China) Wu Yu	5
(Hungary) Gabriella Busa	0
(Spain) María González	5

Round of 16
(Kazakhstan) Zhazira Urakbayeva	0
(India) Sakshi Chaudhary	5
(China) Wu Yu	5
(Spain) María González	0

Quarterfinals
(India) Sakshi Chaudhary	0
(China) Wu Yu	5

=== Bottom half ===
==== Section 3 ====
Round of 32
(Mozambique) Helena Bagão	5
(Kenya) Ann Maithori	0
(Thailand) Preedakamon Tintabthai	1
(Mongolia) Oyuntsetsegiin Yesügen	4
(Russia) Anna Aedma	3
(Australia) Monique Suraci	4
(Singapore) Efasha Kamarudin	0
(Italy) Sirine Charaabi	5

Round of 16
(Mozambique) Helena Bagão
(Mongolia) Oyuntsetsegiin Yesügen	RSC
(Australia) Monique Suraci	0
(Italy) Sirine Charaabi	5

Quarterfinals
(Mongolia) Oyuntsetsegiin Yesügen	0
(Italy) Sirine Charaabi	5

==== Section 4 ====
Round of 32
(Bulgaria) Venelina Poptoleva	3
(Vietnam) Nguyễn Thị Ngọc Trân	4
(New Zealand) Tasmyn Benny	0
(France) Romane Moulai	5
(Serbia) Sara Ćirković	5
(Turkey) Beyza Saraçoğlu	0

Round of 16
(Vietnam) Nguyễn Thị Ngọc Trân	0
(France) Romane Moulai	5
(Serbia) Sara Ćirković	0
(Japan) Rinka Kinoshita	5

Quarterfinals
(France) Romane Moulai	0
(Japan) Rinka Kinoshita	5
