= 2023 IBA Women's World Boxing Championships – Bantamweight =

Bantamweight at the 2023 IBA Women's World Boxing Championships
- Venue: K. D. Jadhav Indoor Hall
- Location: New Delhi, India
- Dates: 16–26 March
- Competitors: 41 from 41 nations

Medalists
gold medal	Huang Hsiao-wen	Chinese Taipei
silver medal	Yeni Arias	Colombia
bronze medal	Jutamas Jitpong	Thailand
bronze medal	Möngöntsetsegiin Enkhjargal	Mongolia

The Bantamweight competition at the 2023 IBA Women's World Boxing Championships was held between 16 and 26 March 2023.

== Results ==
=== Finals ===
Semi-finals
(Thailand) Jutamas Jitpong	0
(Chinese Taipei) Huang Hsiao-wen	5
(Mongolia) Möngöntsetsegiin Enkhjargal	0
(Colombia) Yeni Arias	5

Final
(Chinese Taipei) Huang Hsiao-wen	5
(Colombia) Yeni Arias	0

=== Top half ===
==== Section 1 ====
Round of 64
(Hungary) Hanna Lakotár
(India) Preeti Pawar	RSC
(Azerbaijan) Zeynab Rahimova	5
(South Africa) Lethokuhle Sibisi	0
(Kenya) Amina Martha Faki	1
(Venezuela) Johana Gómez	4

Round of 32
(Romania) Lăcrămioara Perijoc	3
(India) Preeti Pawar	4
(Nepal) Minu Gurung	0
(Thailand) Jutamas Jitpong	5
(Australia) Christine Gillespie	0
(Azerbaijan) Zeynab Rahimova	5
(Venezuela) Johana Gómez	4
(Sierra Leone) Sara Haghighat-joo	1

Round of 16
(India) Preeti Pawar	3
(Thailand) Jutamas Jitpong	4
(Azerbaijan) Zeynab Rahimova
(Venezuela) Johana Gómez	RSC

Quarterfinals
(Thailand) Jutamas Jitpong	5
(Venezuela) Johana Gómez	0

==== Section 2 ====
Round of 64
(France) Delphine Mancini	4
(Armenia) Ekaterina Sycheva	0
(China) Li Yijie	5
(Federated States of Micronesia) Jennifer Chieng	0

Round of 32
(Dominican Republic) Estéfani Almánzar	1
(France) Delphine Mancini	4
(Mozambique) Benilde Macaringue	1
(Russia) Karina Tazabekova	3
(Turkey) Nilay Yaren Çam
(Chinese Taipei) Huang Hsiao-wen	RSC
(China) Li Yijie	w/o
(Bulgaria) Stanimira Petrova

Round of 16
(France) Delphine Mancini	w/o
(Russia) Karina Tazabekova
(Chinese Taipei) Huang Hsiao-wen	RSC
(China) Li Yijie

Quarterfinals
(France) Delphine Mancini	0
(Chinese Taipei) Huang Hsiao-wen	5

=== Bottom half ===
==== Section 3 ====
Round of 64
(Mongolia) Möngöntsetsegiin Enkhjargal	3
(Vietnam) Võ Thị Kim Ánh	0
(Singapore) Rafhana Binte Rosli
(Italy) Olena Savchuk	RSC

Round of 32
(Morocco) Widad Bertal	0
(Mongolia) Möngöntsetsegiin Enkhjargal	3
(Brazil) Tatiana Chagas	5
(Puerto Rico) Milady Santana	0
(Australia) Tiana Echegaray	4
(Japan) Hana Narita	1
(Italy) Olena Savchuk	5
(Serbia) Jelena Zekić	0

Round of 16
(Mongolia) Möngöntsetsegiin Enkhjargal	4
(Brazil) Tatiana Chagas	1
(Australia) Tiana Echegaray	1
(Italy) Olena Savchuk	4

Quarterfinals
(Mongolia) Möngöntsetsegiin Enkhjargal	5
(Italy) Olena Savchuk	0

==== Section 4 ====
Round of 64
(Botswana) Phekie Bele	1
(Moldova) Iulia Coroli	4
(Spain) María del Carmen Madueño	0
(South Korea) Im Ae-ji	5

Round of 32
(Algeria) Fatma-Zohra Hedjala	1
(Moldova) Iulia Coroli	3
(Colombia) Yeni Arias	w/o
(Croatia) Nikolina Ćaćić
(Mexico) Gloria Fernández	0
(Uzbekistan) Nigina Uktamova	5
(South Korea) Im Ae-ji	1
(Kazakhstan) Zhaina Shekerbekova	4

Round of 16
(Moldova) Iulia Coroli
(Colombia) Yeni Arias	RSC
(Uzbekistan) Nigina Uktamova	2
(Kazakhstan) Zhaina Shekerbekova	5

Quarterfinals
(Colombia) Yeni Arias	3
(Kazakhstan) Zhaina Shekerbekova	0
