= 2025 IBA Women's World Boxing Championships – Bantamweight =

Bantamweight at the 2025 IBA Women's World Boxing Championships
- Venue: Sportski centar Čair
- Location: Niš, Serbia
- Dates: 10–14 March (preliminaries/semifinals); 16 March (final)
- Competitors: 29 from 29 nations

Medalists
gold medal	Widad Bertal	Morocco
silver medal	Hatice Akbaş	Turkey
bronze medal	Sara Ćirković	Serbia
bronze medal	Natnicha Chongprongklang	Thailand

The Bantamweight competition at the 2025 IBA Women's World Boxing Championships was held from 10 to 16 March 2025.

== Results ==
=== Finals ===
Semi-finals
(Morocco) Widad Bertal	4
(Serbia) Sara Ćirković	3
(Turkey) Hatice Akbaş	4
(Thailand) Natnicha Chongprongklang	1

Final
(Morocco) Widad Bertal	5
(Turkey) Hatice Akbaş	2

=== Top half ===
==== Section 1 ====
Round of 32
(North Korea) Paek Jin-hyang	4
(Uzbekistan) Aziza Yokubova	3
(China) Zhao Xuan	0
(Vietnam) Võ Thị Kim Ánh	5
(Armenia) Ekaterina Sycheva	2
(Azerbaijan) Zeynab Rahimova	5

Round of 16
(Morocco) Widad Bertal	4
(North Korea) Paek Jin-hyang	3
(Vietnam) Võ Thị Kim Ánh	5
(Azerbaijan) Zeynab Rahimova	2

Quarterfinals
(Morocco) Widad Bertal	RSC
(Vietnam) Võ Thị Kim Ánh

==== Section 2 ====
Round of 32
(Kazakhstan) Zhaina Shekerbekova	w/o
Jhuskarly Becerra
(Mexico) Ariadna Gil
(Tanzania) Zulfa Rwenda
(Romania) Daiana Andor
(Germany) Melani Volkova	DSQ
(Afghanistan) Monira Haidari
(Serbia) Sara Ćirković	w/o

Round of 16
(Kazakhstan) Zhaina Shekerbekova	5
(Mexico) Ariadna Gil	0
(Germany) Melani Volkova
(Serbia) Sara Ćirković	RSC

Quarterfinals
(Kazakhstan) Zhaina Shekerbekova	3
(Serbia) Sara Ćirković	4

=== Bottom half ===
==== Section 3 ====
Round of 32
(Tunisia) Islem Ferchichi	0
(Russia) Karina Tazabekova	5
(Turkey) Hatice Akbaş	RSC
(Kyrgyzstan) Miraida Tashpolotova
(Ethiopia) Roman Abate	3
(Moldova) Iulia Coroli	4

Round of 16
(Kenya) Amina Faki	0
(Russia) Karina Tazabekova	5
(Turkey) Hatice Akbaş	RSC
(Moldova) Iulia Coroli

Quarterfinals
(Russia) Karina Tazabekova	1
(Turkey) Hatice Akbaş	4

==== Section 4 ====
Round of 32
(Thailand) Natnicha Chongprongklang	5
(Republic of Ireland) Jennifer Lehane	0
(Greece) Korina Dapote	0
(Puerto Rico) Angelyris López	5
(Mongolia) Nergui Oyun-Erdene	w/o
(South Africa) Asihlobanise Hobongwana

Round of 16
(Thailand) Natnicha Chongprongklang	5
(Puerto Rico) Angelyris López	2
(Mongolia) Nergui Oyun-Erdene	0
(Venezuela) Johana Gómez	5

Quarterfinals
(Thailand) Natnicha Chongprongklang	4
(Venezuela) Johana Gómez	1
