= Boxing at the 2026 Asian Games – Women's 51 kg =

Boxing competitions

Women's 51 kg at the 2026 Asian Games
- Venue: Nishio City Gymnasium
- Date: 22 September – 2 October 2026
- Competitors: 19 from 19 nations

Medalists
gold medal	Wu Yu	China
silver medal	Nguyễn Thị Tâm	Vietnam
bronze medal	Feruza Kazakova	Uzbekistan
bronze medal	Alua Balkibekova	Kazakhstan

The women's 51 kilograms event at the 2026 Asian Games took place from 22 September to 2 October 2026 at the Nishio City Gymnasium, Nishio, Aichi Prefecture, Japan.

The gold medal was won by China's Wu Yu, who defeated Vietnam's Nguyễn Thị Tâm by a 5–0 unanimous decision in the final. Feruza Kazakova of Uzbekistan and Alua Balkibekova of Kazakhstan took the bronze medals.

== Schedule ==
All times are Japan Standard Time (UTC+09:00)

Date	Time	Event
Tuesday, 22 September 2026	12:00	Round of 32
Thursday, 24 September 2026	12:00	Round of 16
Monday, 28 September 2026	12:00	Quarterfinals
Wednesday, 30 September 2026	13:00	Semifinals
Friday, 2 October 2026	13:00	Final

== Results ==
Legend

- RSC — Won by referee stop contest

=== Final ===
Final
Wu Yu (CHN)	5
Nguyễn Thị Tâm (VIE)	0

=== Top half ===
Round of 32
Nadeeka Pushpakumari (SRI)	5
Lala Kargar (AFG)	0

Round of 16
Wu Yu (CHN)	5
Nadeeka Pushpakumari (SRI)	0
Oyuntsetsegiin Yesügen (MGL)	RSC
Maria Rind (PAK)
Feruza Kazakova (UZB)	5
Chuthamat Raksat (THA)	0
Hanan Nassar (JOR)	0
An Kum-byol (PRK)	5

Quarterfinals
Wu Yu (CHN)	5
Oyuntsetsegiin Yesügen (MGL)	0
Feruza Kazakova (UZB)	5
An Kum-byol (PRK)	0

Semifinals
Wu Yu (CHN)	5
Feruza Kazakova (UZB)	0

=== Bottom half ===
Round of 32
Nguyễn Thị Tâm (VIE)	5
Ramisha Shrestha (NEP)	0
Sakshi Chaudhary (IND)	5
Aira Villegas (PHI)	0

Round of 16
Guo Yi-xuan (TPE)	1
Nguyễn Thị Tâm (VIE)	4
Yara Al-Amri (KSA)	0
Bak Cho-rong (KOR)	5
Yuna Nishinaka (JPN)	5
Fariza Yoqubova (TJK)	0
Sakshi Chaudhary (IND)	2
Alua Balkibekova (KAZ)	3

Quarterfinals
Nguyễn Thị Tâm (VIE)	5
Bak Cho-rong (KOR)	0
Yuna Nishinaka (JPN)	2
Alua Balkibekova (KAZ)	3

Semifinals
Nguyễn Thị Tâm (VIE)	5
Alua Balkibekova (KAZ)	0
