= 2025 World Boxing Championships – Women's 54 kg =

Competition at amateur boxing tournament

Women's 54 kg at the 2025 World Boxing Championships
- Venue: Liverpool Arena
- Location: Liverpool, England
- Dates: 4–14 September
- Competitors: 21 from 21 nations

Medalists
gold medal	Huang Hsiao-wen	Chinese Taipei
silver medal	Yoseline Perez	United States
bronze medal	Sirine Charaabi	Italy
bronze medal	Im Ae-ji	South Korea

The Women's 54 kg competition at the 2025 World Boxing Championships was held from 4 to 14 September 2025.

== Results ==
=== Final ===
Final; 14 September
Yoseline Perez (USA)	1
Huang Hsiao-wen (TPE)	4

=== Top half ===
Preliminaries; 4 September
Viktoriia Shkeul (UKR)
Sakshi Chaudhary (IND)	RSC
Elina Bazarova (KAZ)	0
Nigina Uktamova (UZB)	5
Wiktoria Rogalińska (POL)	0
Jennifer Lehane (IRL)	5

Round of 16; 8 September
Hatice Akbaş (TUR)	5
Sakshi Chaudhary (IND)	0
Scarlett Delgado (CAN)	1
Sirine Charaabi (ITA)	4
Hanna Lakotár (HUN)	0
Nigina Uktamova (UZB)	5
Jennifer Lehane (IRL)	0
Yoseline Perez (USA)	5

Quarter-finals; 10 September
Hatice Akbaş (TUR)	0
Sirine Charaabi (ITA)	5
Nigina Uktamova (UZB)	2
Yoseline Perez (USA)	3

Semi-finals; 13 September
Sirine Charaabi (ITA)	0
Yoseline Perez (USA)	5

=== Bottom half ===
Preliminaries; 4 September
Huang Hsiao-wen (TPE)	5
Korin Kokufu (JPN)	0
Cao Wanqi (CHN)	1
Lauren Mackie (ENG)	4

Round of 16; 8 September
Oyuntsetsegiin Yesügen (MGL)	0
Huang Hsiao-wen (TPE)	5
Ariadna Gil (MEX)	5
Stephanie Kernachan (SCO)	0
Tatiana Chagas (BRA)	5
Tatjana Obermeier (GER)	0
Lauren Mackie (ENG)	2
Im Ae-ji (KOR)	3

Quarter-finals; 10 September
Huang Hsiao-wen (TPE)	5
Ariadna Gil (MEX)	0
Tatiana Chagas (BRA)	0
Im Ae-ji (KOR)	5

Semi-finals; 13 September
Huang Hsiao-wen (TPE)	5
Im Ae-ji (KOR)	0
