= Yoseline Perez =

American boxer (born 2004)

Personal information
- Nationality: United States
- Born: March 13, 2004 (age 22) Houston, Texas, U.S.
- Height: 1.60 m (5 ft 3 in)
- Weight: Bantamweight; Featherweight

Boxing career
Medal record
Women's amateur boxing
Representing United States
World Championships
Silver medal – second place	2025 Liverpool	54 kg
Junior World Championships
Gold medal – first place	2022 La Nucia	57 kg

Yoseline Perez (born March 13, 2004) is an American amateur boxer. She is a gold medalist at the Junior World Championships (2022) and a silver medalist at the World Boxing Championships (2025).

== Early life ==
Perez was born on March 13, 2004 in Houston, Texas. Her parents had immigrated from Mexico. She has four older brothers who took up boxing and decided to follow in their footsteps.

== Amateur career ==
In 2022, Perez competed at the Youth World Championships in La Nucia in the 57 kg (featherweight) category. In the final, she defeated Asya Ari to win the gold medal. Shortly afterwards, at the 2023 Pan American Games in Santiago, Chile, she competed in the 54 kg category, where she was lost to eventual gold medalist Yeni Arias in the round of 16.

At Stage I of the 2025 World Boxing Cup, held in Foz do Iguaçu, Perez reached the final, where she lost to Wiktoria Rogalińska. At Stage II of the World Cup held in Astana, she reached the final and lost to Sakshi Chaudhary.

In September 2025, at the World Boxing Championships, Perez competed in the 54 kg category. She faced Jennifer Lehane in the second round and won via unanimous decision. She then defeated Nigina Uktamova in the quarterfinal and Sirine Charaabi in the semifinals. Heading to the final, she faced Huang Hsiao-wen and lost the bout, thus winning the silver medal.
