= Boxing at the 2023 European Games – Women's bantamweight =

Women's bantamweight boxing at the 2023 European Games
- Venue: Nowy Targ Arena
- Location: Nowy Targ, Poland
- Dates: 24 June – 1 July
- Competitors: 24 from 24 nations

Medalists
gold medal	Stanimira Petrova	Bulgaria
silver medal	Lăcrămioara Perijoc	Romania
bronze medal	Charley Davison	Great Britain
bronze medal	Hatice Akbaş	Turkey

The women's bantamweight boxing event at the 2023 European Games was held between 24 June and 1 July 2023.

== Results ==
=== Finals ===
Semi-finals
Charley Davison (GBR)	0
Stanimira Petrova (BUL)	5
Lăcrămioara Perijoc (ROU)	3
Hatice Akbaş (TUR)	2

Final
Stanimira Petrova (BUL)	5
Lăcrămioara Perijoc (ROU)	0

=== Top half ===
==== Section 1 ====
Round of 32
Bojana Gojković (MNE)	1
Mary Romero (ESP)	4
Iulia Coroli (MDA)	0
Mayssen Lambot (BEL)	5

Round of 16
Charley Davison (GBR)	5
Mary Romero (ESP)	0
Mayssen Lambot (BEL)	0
Zehra Milli (SWE)	5

Quarterfinals
Charley Davison (GBR)	5
Zehra Milli (SWE)	0

==== Section 2 ====
Round of 32
Šejla Oraščanin (BIH)
Anastasiia Kovalchuk (UKR)	WO
Sara Ćirković (SRB)	2
Jennifer Lehane (IRL)	3

Round of 16
Stanimira Petrova (BUL)	5
Anastasiia Kovalchuk (UKR)	0
Jennifer Lehane (IRL)	5
Antonia Giannakopoulou (GRE)	0

Quarterfinals
Stanimira Petrova (BUL)	5
Jennifer Lehane (IRL)	0

=== Bottom half ===
==== Section 3 ====
Round of 32
Delphine Mancini (FRA)	1
Sandra Drabik (POL)	4
Zeynab Rahimova (AZE)
Lăcrămioara Perijoc (ROU)	RSC

Round of 16
Ekaterina Sycheva (ARM)	1
Sandra Drabik (POL)	4
Lăcrămioara Perijoc (ROU)	5
Ana Khunjua (GEO)	0

Quarterfinals
Sandra Drabik (POL)	0
Lăcrămioara Perijoc (ROU)	5

==== Section 4 ====
Round of 32
Claudia Tótová (CZE)	1
Hanna Lakotár (HUN)	4
Emma Jokiaho (FIN)	0
Sirine Charaabi (ITA)	5

Round of 16
Hatice Akbaş (TUR)	5
Hanna Lakotár (HUN)	0
Sirine Charaabi (ITA)	5
Nikolina Ćaćić (CRO)	0

Quarterfinals
Hatice Akbaş (TUR)	4
Sirine Charaabi (ITA)	1
