= Boxing at the 2026 Asian Games – Women's 54 kg =

Boxing competitions

Women's 54 kg at the 2026 Asian Games
- Venue: Nishio City Gymnasium
- Date: 22 September – 2 October 2026
- Competitors: 18 from 18 nations

Medalists
gold medal	Natnicha Chongprongklang	Thailand
silver medal	Pang Chol-mi	North Korea
bronze medal	Tsukimi Namiki	Japan
bronze medal	Zhao Xuan	China

The women's 54 kilograms event at the 2026 Asian Games took place from 22 September to 2 October 2026 at the Nishio City Gymnasium, Nishio, Aichi Prefecture, Japan.

The gold medal was won by Thailand's Natnicha Chongprongklang, who defeated North Korea's Pang Chol-mi by a 4–1 split decision in the final. Tsukimi Namiki of Japan and Zhao Xuan of China took the bronze medals.

== Schedule ==
All times are Japan Standard Time (UTC+09:00)

Date	Time	Event
Tuesday, 22 September 2026	12:45	Round of 32
Friday, 25 September 2026	12:00	Round of 16
Sunday, 27 September 2026	12:00	Quarterfinals
Tuesday, 29 September 2026	13:00	Semifinals
Friday, 2 October 2026	17:30	Final

== Results ==
Legend

- RSC — Won by referee stop contest

=== Final ===
Final
Natnicha Chongprongklang (THA)	4
Pang Chol-mi (PRK)	1

=== Top half ===
Round of 32
Keshani Hansika (SRI)	0
Võ Thị Kim Ánh (VIE)	5

Round of 16
Huang Hsiao-wen (TPE)	5
Võ Thị Kim Ánh (VIE)	0
Asmita Duwal (NEP)	0
Tsukimi Namiki (JPN)	5
Natnicha Chongprongklang (THA)	5
Riza Pasuit (PHI)	0
Bibinashastamo Kholova (TJK)	0
Nigina Uktamova (UZB)	5

Quarterfinals
Huang Hsiao-wen (TPE)	0
Tsukimi Namiki (JPN)	3
Natnicha Chongprongklang (THA)	3
Nigina Uktamova (UZB)	2

Semifinals
Tsukimi Namiki (JPN)	2
Natnicha Chongprongklang (THA)	3

=== Bottom half ===
Round of 32
Nabila Maharani (INA)
Pang Chol-mi (PRK)	RSC

Round of 16
Zhao Xuan (CHN)	4
Nazym Kyzaibay (KAZ)	1
Maryam Khamis (BRN)	0
Kinga Wangmo (BHU)	5
Möngöntsetsegiin Enkhjargal (MGL)	3
Yang Lee-yeong (KOR)	2
Pang Chol-mi (PRK)	5
Preeti Pawar (IND)	0

Quarterfinals
Zhao Xuan (CHN)	5
Kinga Wangmo (BHU)	0
Möngöntsetsegiin Enkhjargal (MGL)
Pang Chol-mi (PRK)	RSC

Semifinals
Zhao Xuan (CHN)	0
Pang Chol-mi (PRK)	5
