= Feruza Kazakova =

Uzbekistan boxer (born 2003)

Personal information
- Nationality: Uzbekistan
- Born: 31 October 2003 (age 22) Andijan, Uzbekistan

Boxing career
Medal record
Women's amateur boxing
Representing Uzbekistan
World Championships
Bronze medal – third place	2025 Liverpool	51 kg
IBA World Championships
Bronze medal – third place	2025 Niš	Flyweight
Asian Games
Bronze medal – third place	2026 Aichi–Nagoya	51 kg
Asian Championships
Gold medal – first place	2024 Chiang Mai	Flyweight

Feruza Kazakova (Uzbek: Феруза Казакова; born 31 October 2003) is an Uzbekistani boxer who competes in the flyweight division. She is a gold medalist at the Asian Championships and a bronze medalist at the IBA Women's World Boxing Championships, World Boxing Championships and the Asian Games.

== Amateur career ==
Kazakova began boxing at the age of seven.

Kazakova competed at the 2023 IBA Women's World Boxing Championships in New Delhi, India, where she was eliminated by Yuliya Apanasovich in round of 16. In December 2024, she won the gold medal in the Asian Championships in the flyweight category, where she defeated Svitlana Umanska in the gold medal match.

Kazakova won a bronze medal at the 2025 IBA Women's World Boxing Championships in Niš, Serbia, in which she was eliminated by Pang Chol-mi in the semifinals. At Stage II of the World Cup held in Astana, she reached the semifinals and lost to Sakshi Chaudhary.

Kazakova competed in the 51 kg category of the 2025 World Boxing Championships held in Liverpool, England. She defeated Yuliett Hinestroza in their opening round, Caroline de Almeida in the round of 16 and Balsangiin Möngönsaran in the quarterfinals, all by unanimous decision. In the semifinals, Kazakova lost to Buse Naz Çakıroğlu, winning a bronze medal.

At the 2026 Asian Games in Nagoya, Kazakova won a bronze medal in the women's 51 kg weight category after losing to Wu Yu in the semifinals.
