= 2025 World Boxing Championships – Women's 51 kg =

Competition at amateur boxing tournament

Women's 51 kg at the 2025 World Boxing Championships
- Venue: Liverpool Arena
- Location: Liverpool, England
- Dates: 6–14 September
- Competitors: 29 from 29 nations

Medalists
gold medal	Alua Balkibekova	Kazakhstan
silver medal	Buse Naz Çakıroğlu	Turkey
bronze medal	Feruza Kazakova	Uzbekistan
bronze medal	Qi Xinyu	China

The Women's 51 kg competition at the 2025 World Boxing Championships was held from 6 to 14 September 2025.

== Results ==
=== Final ===
Final; 14 September
Buse Naz Çakıroğlu (TUR)	0
Alua Balkibekova (KAZ)	5

=== Top half ===
Preliminaries; 6 September
Natalia Kuczewska (POL)	2
Irismar Cardozo (VEN)	3
Monique Suraci (AUS)	0
Yuna Nishinaka (JPN)	5
Jennifer Lozano (USA)	0
Nikhat Zareen (IND)	5
Feruza Kazakova (UZB)	5
Yuliett Hinestroza (PAN)	0
Caroline de Almeida (BRA)	5
Brooke Neely (SCO)	0
Balsangiin Möngönsaran (MGL)	5
Yaroslava Marynchuk (UKR)	0
Esmeralda Patino (MEX)	3
Lucia Ayari (ITA)	2

Round of 16; 9 September
Buse Naz Çakıroğlu (TUR)	5
Irismar Cardozo (VEN)	0
Yuna Nishinaka (JPN)	0
Nikhat Zareen (IND)	5
Feruza Kazakova (UZB)	5
Caroline de Almeida (BRA)	0
Balsangiin Möngönsaran (MGL)	4
Esmeralda Patino (MEX)	1

Quarter-finals; 10 September
Buse Naz Çakıroğlu (TUR)	5
Nikhat Zareen (IND)	0
Feruza Kazakova (UZB)	5
Balsangiin Möngönsaran (MGL)	0

Semi-finals; 13 September
Buse Naz Çakıroğlu (TUR)	4
Feruza Kazakova (UZB)	1

=== Bottom half ===
Preliminaries; 6 September
Fatiha Mansouri (ALG)	1
Mun Ga-yeon (KOR)	4
Maxi Klötzer (GER)	3
Venelina Poptoleva (BUL)	2
Kata Pap (HUN)	0
Guo Yi-xuan (TPE)	3
Yara Al-Amri (KSA)	0
Mckenzie Wright (CAN)	5
Kelsey Oakley (ENG)	1
Qi Xinyu (CHN)	4
Laura Fuertes (ESP)	3
Daina Moorehouse (IRL)	2

Round of 16; 9 September
Alua Balkibekova (KAZ)	5
Mun Ga-yeon (KOR)	0
Maxi Klötzer (GER)	1
Guo Yi-xuan (TPE)	4
Mckenzie Wright (CAN)	0
Qi Xinyu (CHN)	5
Laura Fuertes (ESP)	WO
Pihla Kaivo-oja (FIN)

Quarter-finals; 10 September
Alua Balkibekova (KAZ)	5
Guo Yi-xuan (TPE)	0
Qi Xinyu (CHN)	4
Laura Fuertes (ESP)	1

Semi-finals; 13 September
Alua Balkibekova (KAZ)	4
Qi Xinyu (CHN)	1
