= Mckenzie Wright =

Canadian boxer (born 1990)

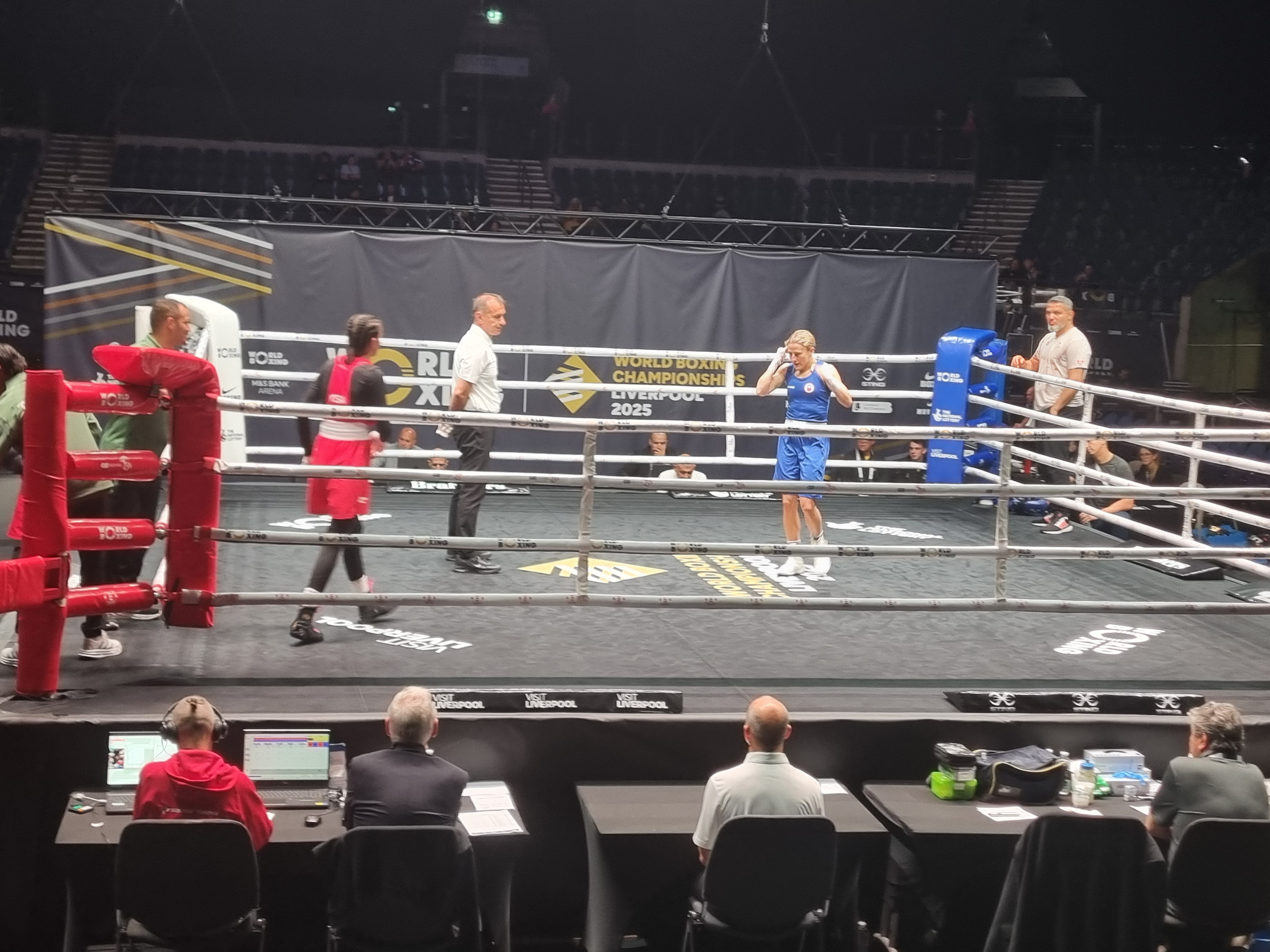
- Mckenzie Wright (in blue) at the 2025 World Boxing Championships

Personal information
- Nationality: (Canada) Canadian
- Born: 31 May 1990 (age 36)

Sport
- Sport: Boxing
- Weight class: Flyweight
- Club: City Boxing Club
Medal record
Women's amateur boxing
Representing Canada
Pan American Games
Bronze medal – third place	2023 Santiago	50 kg

Mckenzie Wright (born 31 May 1990) is a Canadian boxer. She won a bronze medal in the 50kg division at the 2023 Pan American Games. Wright narrowly missed out on qualifying for the 2024 Summer Olympics, losing in the final round of the second qualification tournament. She represented her country at the 2025 World Boxing Championships, losing in the second round to eventual bronze medalist Qi Xinyu from China.
