= 2019 AIBA Women's World Boxing Championships – Bantamweight =

Bantamweight at the 2019 AIBA Women's World Boxing Championships
- Venue: FSK Sports Complex
- Location: Ulan-Ude, Russia
- Dates: 4–13 October
- Competitors: 22 from 22 nations

Medalists
gold medal	Huang Hsiao-wen	Chinese Taipei
silver medal	Caroline Cruveillier	France
bronze medal	Jamuna Boro	India
bronze medal	Mikiah Kreps	United States

The Bantamweight competition at the 2019 AIBA Women's World Boxing Championships was held between 4 and 13 October 2019.

== Schedule ==
The schedule was as follows:

Date	Time	Round
Friday 4 October 2019	18:00	Round of 32
Wednesday 9 October 2019	13:00; 18:00	Round of 16
Thursday 10 October 2019	18:30	Quarterfinals
Saturday 12 October 2019	18:30	Semifinals
Sunday 13 October 2019	After 16:00	Final

All times are Irkutsk Time (UTC+8)

== Results ==
=== Finals ===
Semifinals
(Chinese Taipei) Huang Hsiao-wen	5
(India) Jamuna Boro	0
(France) Caroline Cruveillier	3
(United States) Mikiah Kreps	2

Final
(Chinese Taipei) Huang Hsiao-wen	4
(France) Caroline Cruveillier	1

=== Top half ===
==== Section 1 ====
Round of 32
(Italy) Giordana Sorrentino	5
(Japan) Saya Hamamoto	0

Round of 16
(Chinese Taipei) Huang Hsiao-wen	5
(Italy) Giordana Sorrentino	0
(Indonesia) Silpa Lau Ratu	0
(Philippines) Aira Villegas	5

Quarterfinals
(Chinese Taipei) Huang Hsiao-wen	5
(Philippines) Aira Villegas	0

==== Section 2 ====
Round of 32
(India) Jamuna Boro	5
(Mongolia) Erdenedalaigiin Michidmaa	0
(Armenia) Anahit Aroyan	0
(Germany) Ursula Gottlob	5

Round of 16
(Algeria) Ouidad Sfouh	0
(India) Jamuna Boro	5
(Germany) Ursula Gottlob	3
(Belarus) Yuliya Apanasovich	2

Quarterfinals
(India) Jamuna Boro	4
(Germany) Ursula Gottlob	1

=== Bottom half ===
==== Section 3 ====
Round of 32
(Morocco) Oumayma El Ouali	0
(Thailand) Preedakamon Tintabhtai	5
(Moldova) Iulia Coroli	2
(Australia) Antonia Konstantopoulou	3

Round of 16
(France) Caroline Cruveillier	3
(Thailand) Preedakamon Tintabhtai	2
(Australia) Antonia Konstantopoulou	w/o
(Democratic Republic of the Congo) Modestine Munga

Quarterfinals
(France) Caroline Cruveillier	5
(Australia) Antonia Konstantopoulou	0

==== Section 4 ====
Round of 32
(Uzbekistan) Ferangiz Khoshimova	0
(United States) Mikiah Kreps	5

Round of 16
(Kazakhstan) Dina Zholaman	5
(Ukraine) Inna Statkevych	0
(United States) Mikiah Kreps	4
(Russia) Karina Tazabekova	1

Quarterfinals
(Kazakhstan) Dina Zholaman	1
(United States) Mikiah Kreps	4
