= 2016 AIBA Women's World Boxing Championships – Bantamweight =

Boxing competitions

Bantamweight at the 2016 AIBA Women's World Boxing Championships
- Dates: 20–27 May
- Competitors: 27 from 27 nations

Medalists
gold medal	Dina Zholaman	Kazakhstan
silver medal	Stoyka Petrova	Bulgaria
bronze medal	Christina Cruz	United States
bronze medal	Liu Piaopiao	China

The Bantamweight (54 kg) competition at the 2016 AIBA Women's World Boxing Championships was held from 20 to 27 May 2016.

== Draw ==
Round of 32
20 May
(Uzbekistan) Aziza Yakubova	0
(Morocco) Laila Marzaq	3
20 May
(Bulgaria) Stoyka Petrova	3
(Turkey) Buse Naz Çakıroğlu	0
20 May
(United Kingdom) Lisa Whiteside	3
(Ukraine) Snizhana Kholodkova	0
20 May
(Republic of Ireland) Duffy Dervla	0
(Italy) Diletta Cipollone	3
20 May
(Belarus) Helina Bruyevich	3
(Hungary) Szabina Szűcs	0
20 May
(Philippines) Irish Magno	0
(Mongolia) Tömörkhuyagiin Bolortuul	3
20 May
(India) Nikhat Zareen	2
(Australia) Bianca El-Mir	1
20 May
(Canada) Erica Adjei	2
(Tunisia) Mariem Homrani	1
20 May
(Greece) Aikaterini Koutsogeorgopoulou	2
(Finland) Marjut Lausti	1
20 May
(Japan) Aya Shinmoto	3
(Czech Republic) Alice Šrámková	0
20 May
(Romania) Claudia Nechita	0
(Germany) Omella Wahner	3

Round of 16
22 May
(Russia) Saiana Sagataeva	3
(Morocco) Laila Marzaq	0
22 May
(Bulgaria) Stoyka Petrova	3
(United Kingdom) Lisa Whiteside	0
22 May
(France) Delphine Mancini	WO
(Italy) Diletta Cipollone
22 May
(Belarus) Helina Bruyevich	0
(United States) Christina Cruz	3
22 May
(China) Liu Piaopiao	3
(Mongolia) Tömörkhuyagiin Bolortuul	0
22 May
(India) Nikhat Zareen	3
(Canada) Erica Adjei	0
22 May
(Greece) Aikaterini Koutsogeorgopoulou	0
(Japan) Aya Shinmoto	3
22 May
(Germany) Omella Wahner	0
(Kazakhstan) Dina Zholaman	3

Quarterfinals
24 May
(Russia) Saiana Sagataeva	1
(Bulgaria) Stoyka Petrova	2
24 May
(France) Delphine Mancini	0
(United States) Christina Cruz	2
24 May
(China) Liu Piaopiao	3
(India) Nikhat Zareen	0
24 May
(Japan) Aya Shinmoto	0
(Kazakhstan) Dina Zholaman	3

Semifinals
26 May
(Bulgaria) Stoyka Petrova	3
(United States) Christina Cruz	0
26 May
(China) Liu Piaopiao	0
(Kazakhstan) Dina Zholaman	3

Final
27 May
(Bulgaria) Stoyka Petrova	0
(Kazakhstan) Dina Zholaman	3
