= 2014 AIBA Women's World Boxing Championships – Bantamweight =

Boxing competitions

The Bantamweight (54 kg) competition at the 2014 AIBA Women's World Boxing Championships was held from 16 to 24 November 2014.

== Medalists ==
Gold	Stanimira Petrova (BUL)
Silver	Marzia Davide (ITA)
Bronze	Ayşe Taş (TUR)
Bronze	Elena Savelyeva (RUS)

== Draw ==
=== Preliminaries ===
	Result	
Szabina Szűcs (Hungary)	0–3	(China) Gao Jinyan
Leonela Sánchez (Argentina)	0–3	(Kazakhstan) Dina Zholaman

=== Top half ===
First Round
(Poland) Sandra Drabik	0
(China) Gao Jinyan	2
(Belarus) Helina Bruyevich	3
(South Korea) Nam Eun-jin	0
(Czech Republic) Lenka Kardová	0
(Ukraine) Snizhana Kholodkova	3
(Italy) Marzia Davide	3
(Algeria) Nawel Hallou	0
(Guatemala) Karyn Garcìa	0
(Romania) Claudia Nechita	3
(Turkey) Ayşe Taş	TKO
(Nepal) Nisha Tamang
(Jamaica) Sarah-Joy Rae	0
(Republic of Ireland) Michaela Walsh	3
(Mexico) Denia Sosa Paredes	0
(Azerbaijan) Anna Alimardanova	3

Second Round
(China) Gao Jinyan	3
(Belarus) Helina Bruyevich	0
(Ukraine) Snizhana Kholodkova	0
(Italy) Marzia Davide	3
(Romania) Claudia Nechita
(Turkey) Ayşe Taş	TKO
(Republic of Ireland) Michaela Walsh	0
(Azerbaijan) Anna Alimardanova	2

Quarterfinals
(China) Gao Jinyan	0
(Italy) Marzia Davide	3
(Turkey) Ayşe Taş	3
(Azerbaijan) Anna Alimardanova	0

Semifinals
(Italy) Marzia Davide	3
(Turkey) Ayşe Taş	0

=== Bottom half ===
First Round
(Laos) Mieovady Hongfa	0
(France) Marine Rostan	3
(Indonesia) Norbertha Tajum
(Mongolia) Myagmaryn Gündegmaa	TKO
(Bulgaria) Stanimira Petrova	2
(United States) Christina Cruz	1
(Germany) Azize Nimani	3
(Canada) Vicky Pelletier	0
(Chinese Taipei) Gao Yu-min
(Russia) Elena Savelyeva	TKO
(Zambia) Sally Mumba	WO
(Burundi) Ornella Havyarimama
(India) Meena Maisnam	3
(Ethiopia) Felekech Gebremedihin	0
(Kazakhstan) Dina Zholaman	3
(Australia) Cherneka Johnson	0

Second Round
(France) Marine Rostan	2
(Mongolia) Myagmaryn Gündegmaa	0
(Bulgaria) Stanimira Petrova	2
(Germany) Azize Nimani	1
(Russia) Elena Savelyeva	TKO
(Zambia) Sally Mumba
(India) Meena Maisnam	1
(Kazakhstan) Dina Zholaman	2

Quarterfinals
(France) Marine Rostan	0
(Bulgaria) Stanimira Petrova	2
(Russia) Elena Savelyeva	3
(Kazakhstan) Dina Zholaman	0

Semifinals
(Bulgaria) Stanimira Petrova	2
(Russia) Elena Savelyeva	1

=== Final ===
Final
(Italy) Marzia Davide	1
(Bulgaria) Stanimira Petrova	2
