= 2018 AIBA Women's World Boxing Championships – Bantamweight =

Boxing competitions

Bantamweight at the 2018 AIBA Women's World Boxing Championships
- Dates: 16–24 November
- Competitors: 26 from 26 nations

Medalists
gold medal	Lin Yu-ting	Chinese Taipei
silver medal	Stoyka Petrova	Bulgaria
bronze medal	Myagmardulamyn Nandintsetseg	Mongolia
bronze medal	Kristy Harris	Australia

The Bantamweight (54 kg) competition at the 2018 AIBA Women's World Boxing Championships was held from 16 to 24 November 2018.

== Draw ==
Round of 32
16 Nov
(Uzbekistan) Tursunoy Rakhimova	5
(Republic of the Congo) Modestine Munga Zalia	0
16 Nov
(United States) Christina Cruz	0
(India) Manisha Maun	5
16 Nov
(Kazakhstan) Dina Zholaman	4
(Japan) Mizuki Hiruta	1
16 Nov
(Morocco) Zohra Ez-Zahraoui	3
(Germany) Azize Nimani	2
16 Nov
(Mongolia) Myagmardulamyn Nandintsetseg	RSC
(Hungary) Szabina Szűcs
16 Nov
(Brazil) Jucielen Romeu	5
(Algeria) Nour El Houda Baahmed	0
16 Nov
(Costa Rica) Julianna Rodríguez	5
(Italy) Arianna Delaurenti	0
16 Nov
(Philippines) Aira Villegas	RSC
(Bangladesh) Shamima Akter
16 Nov
(Burundi) Ornella Havyarimana
(Thailand) Peamwilai Laopeam	RSC
16 Nov
(Ukraine) Ivanna Krupenia	3
(China) Lu Yingying	2

Round of 16
18 Nov
(Bulgaria) Stoyka Petrova	4
(Uzbekistan) Tursunoy Rakhimova	1
18 Nov
(India) Manisha Maun	5
(Kazakhstan) Dina Zholaman	0
18 Nov
(Belarus) Yuliya Apanasovich	0
(Morocco) Zohra Ez-Zahraoui	5
18 Nov
(Mongolia) Myagmardulamyn Nandintsetseg	RSC
(Croatia) Željana Piteša
18 Nov
(Russia) Viktoriia Kuleshova	2
(Brazil) Jucielen Romeu	3
18 Nov
(Costa Rica) Julianna Rodríguez	2
(Australia) Kristy Harris	3
18 Nov
(Philippines) Aira Villegas	2
(Thailand) Peamwilai Laopeam	3
18 Nov
(Ukraine) Ivanna Krupenia	0
(Chinese Taipei) Lin Yu-ting	5

Quarterfinals
20 Nov
(Bulgaria) Stoyka Petrova	4
(India) Manisha Maun	1
20 Nov
(Morocco) Zohra Ez-Zahraoui	0
(Mongolia) Myagmardulamyn Nandintsetseg	5
20 Nov
(Brazil) Jucielen Romeu	0
(Australia) Kristy Harris	5
20 Nov
(Thailand) Peamwilai Laopeam	0
(Chinese Taipei) Lin Yu-ting	3

Semifinals
22 Nov
(Bulgaria) Stoyka Petrova	5
(Mongolia) Myagmardulamyn Nandintsetseg	0
22 Nov
(Australia) Kristy Harris	0
(Chinese Taipei) Lin Yu-ting	5

Final
24 Nov
(Bulgaria) Stoyka Petrova	1
(Chinese Taipei) Lin Yu-ting	4
