= Jamuna Boro =

Indian boxer (born 1997)

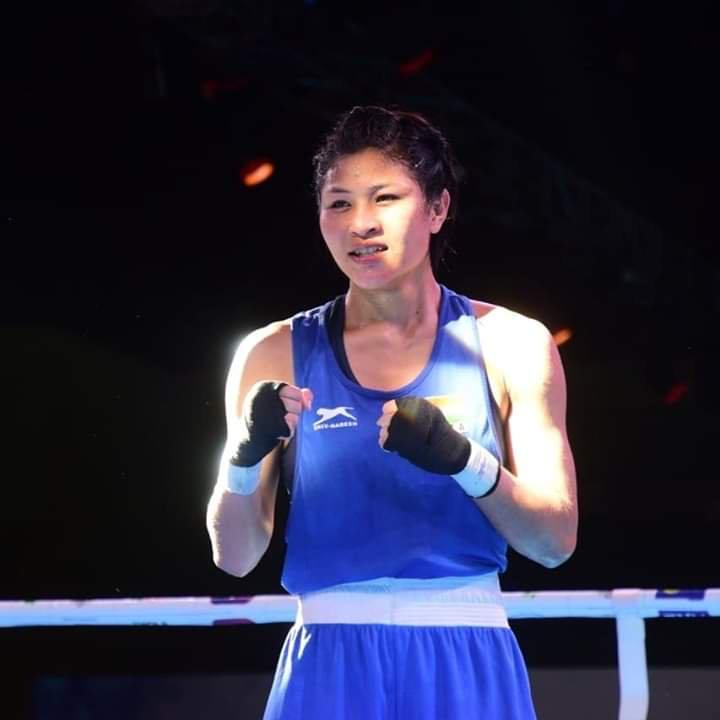

Personal information
- Nationality: Indian
- Born: 7 May 1997 (age 29) Sonitpur, Assam, India

Boxing career
- Weight class: Bantamweight
- Stance: Orthodox

Boxing record
- Total fights: 3
- Wins: 3
- Win by KO: 0
- Losses: 0
- Draws: 0
- No contests: 0
Medal record
Women's amateur boxing
Representing India
World Championships
Bronze medal – third place	2019 Ulan-Ude	Bantamweight

Jamuna Boro (born 7 May 1997) is an Indian former boxer. She won bronze medal at the 2019 AIBA Women's World Boxing Championships. She won gold medal at the 2nd India Open International Boxing Tournament in Guwahati. She won gold medal at the 23rd President's Cup 2019 Boxing International Open Tournament in Labuan Bajo. She won bronze medal at the 5th Elite Women's National Boxing Championship in Hisar (city). Boro resigned from Assam Rifles and was appointed as excise inspector by Assam Government. She quit amateur boxing after the 5th Elite Women's National Boxing Championships.

== Personal life ==
Jamuna Boro was born on 7 May 1997 in Sonitpur, Assam. She hails from Belsiri village. Her father, Parshu Boro, died when she was ten years old and her mother, Nirmali Boro had to work as a vegetable vendor. In September 2021, Boro was appoineted as an excise inspector under the state sports policy of Assam.

== Career ==
She started her career as a Wushu player, coached by John Smith Narzary. In 2009, during the State Wushu Championship held at Udalguri, she was spotted by the observers of Sports Authority of India (SAI). Later she started boxing and was selected for the SAI Regional Sub Centre, based in Guwahati. She is included in the Elite Women's team. She won a silver medal in the 56th Belgrade Women's Boxing Tournament. She had participated at the 2nd 'Bengal Classic' All India Invitational Elite (Men/ Women) Boxing Championship, held in Jatin Das Park, Kolkata from 21 to 25 January 2019 and 67th All India Police Wrestling Cluster held in Jaipur from 27 Feb to 3 March 2019. She won gold medal at the 2nd India Open International Boxing Tournament held in Guwahati from 20 to 24 May 2019 where she defeated her rivals Meena Kumari Maisnam in semi-finals and Y Sandhyarani Devi in the finals. She won gold medal at the 23rd President's Cup 2019 Boxing International Open Tournament held in Labuan Bajo, East Nusa Tenggara where she beat her opponents Kase Serlin Alin Liliwati of Indonesia in semi-finals and Giulia Lamagna of Italy in the finals both by 5–0. She is registered with Boxing Federation of India.

In November 2019, Boro signed up with sports management firm Infinity Optimal Solutions (IOS) which will handle her endorsements and commercial interests.

=== 2019 AIBA Women's World Boxing Championships ===
Boro, in 54 kg category, was amongst ten boxers who had represented India in The 2019 AIBA Women's World Boxing Championships held in Ulan-Ude, Russia from 3 to 13 October 2019. She lost to Chinese Taipei's Huang Hsiao-wen in the semifinal and had to settle with a bronze medal.

== Achievements ==
- 2021: Bronze - 5th Elite Women's National Boxing Championship, Hisar (city).
- 2019: Bronze – AIBA World Boxing Championship at Ulan-Ude, Russia.
- 2019: Gold – India Open International Boxing Tournament, Guwahati.
- 2019: Gold – President Cup Boxing International Open Tournament, Indonesia.
- 2018: Silver – Belgrade Boxing Championship, Serbia.
- 2015: Bronze – World Youth Boxing Championship; Taipei.
- 2013: Gold – 2nd Nations Cup International Sub-Junior Girls Tournament; Zrenjanun, Serbia.
- 2012: Gold – 7th Sub-Junior Women National Boxing Championships; Kolkata.
- 2011: Gold – 2nd Sub-Junior Women National Boxing Championships; Tamil Nadu.
- 2010: Gold – 1st Sub-Junior Women National Boxing Championship; Tamil Nadu.
