= Boxing at the 2018 Asian Games – Women's 57 kg =

Boxing competitions

Women's 57 kg at the 2018 Asian Games
- Venue: Jakarta International Expo
- Date: 24 August – 1 September 2018
- Competitors: 14 from 14 nations

Medalists
gold medal	Yin Junhua	China
silver medal	Jo Son-hwa	North Korea
bronze medal	Huang Hsiao-wen	Chinese Taipei
bronze medal	Nilawan Techasuep	Thailand

The women's feather weight (57 kilograms) event at the 2018 Asian Games took place from 24 August to 1 September 2018 at Jakarta International Expo Hall, Jakarta, Indonesia.

Like all Asian Games boxing events, the competition was a straight single-elimination tournament. Yin Junhua of China won the gold medal. She beat Jo Son-hwa from North Korea in the final bout 4–1. Huang Hsiao-wen from Chinese Taipei and Nilawan Techasuep of Thailand shared the bronze medal.

== Schedule ==
All times are Western Indonesia Time (UTC+07:00)

Date	Time	Event
Friday, 24 August 2018	14:00	Round of 16
Tuesday, 28 August 2018	13:00	Quarterfinals
Friday, 31 August 2018	18:00	Semifinals
Saturday, 1 September 2018	14:00	Final

== Results ==
Legend

- WO — Won by walkover

Round of 16
Tömörkhuyagiin Bolortuul (MGL)	0
Jo Son-hwa (PRK)	5
Yodgoroy Mirzaeva (UZB)	0
Huang Hsiao-wen (TPE)	5
Christina Marwam Jembay (INA)	1
Vương Thị Vỹ (VIE)	4
Nilawan Techasuep (THA)	5
Sangita Sunar (NEP)	0
Keshani Hansika (SRI)	0
Saniya Sultankyzy (KAZ)	5
Yin Junhua (CHN)	3
Nesthy Petecio (PHI)	2

Quarterfinals
Sonia Lather (IND)	0
Jo Son-hwa (PRK)	5
Huang Hsiao-wen (TPE)	3
Vương Thị Vỹ (VIE)	2
Nilawan Techasuep (THA)	3
Saniya Sultankyzy (KAZ)	2
Yin Junhua (CHN)	5
Im Ae-ji (KOR)	0

Semifinals
Jo Son-hwa (PRK)	WO
Huang Hsiao-wen (TPE)
Nilawan Techasuep (THA)	0
Yin Junhua (CHN)	5

Final
Jo Son-hwa (PRK)	1
Yin Junhua (CHN)	4
