= Qi Xinyu =

Chinese boxer (born 2002)

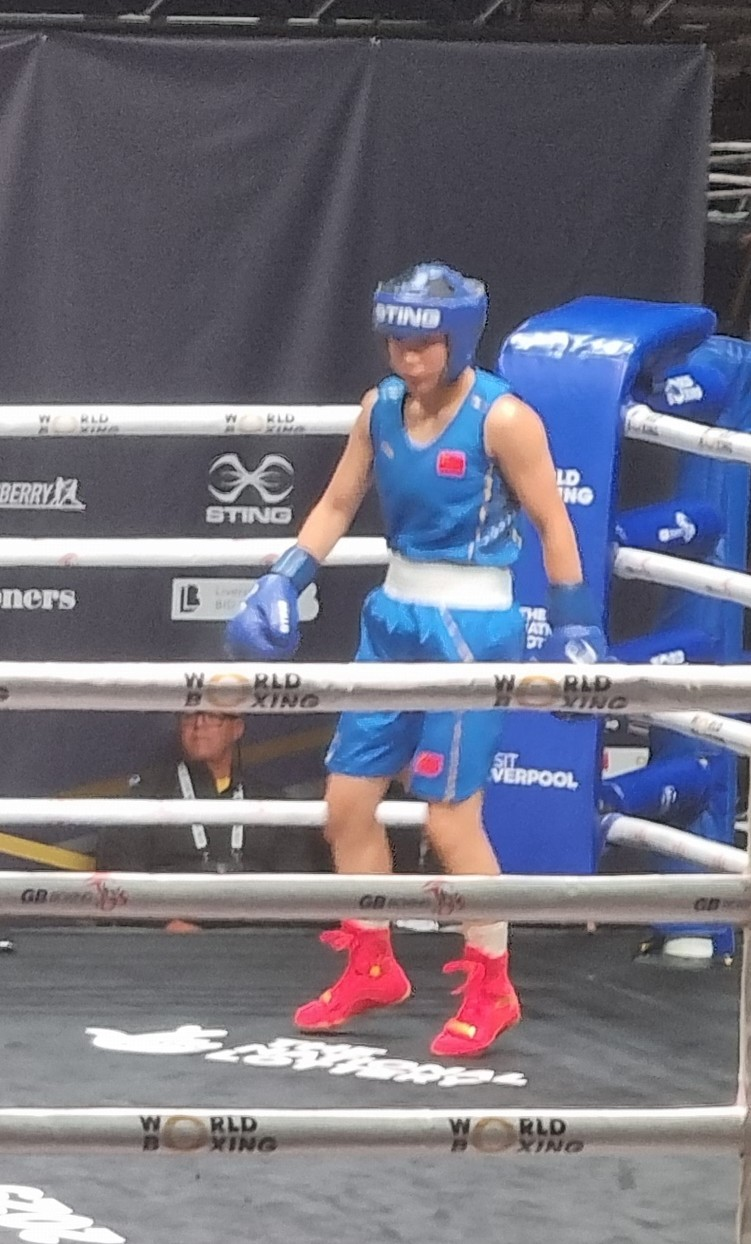
- Qi at the 2025 World Boxing Championships in Liverpool

Personal information
- Nationality: Chinese
- Born: 26 December 2002 (age 23)

Boxing career
Medal record
Women's amateur boxing
Representing China
World Championships
Bronze medal – third place	2025 Liverpool	51 kg

Qi Xinyu (born 26 December 2002) is a Chinese boxer who competes in the flyweight division. She is a bronze medalist at the World Boxing Championships.

== Amateur career ==
In June 2025, Qi reached the final of the Chinese Women's Elite National Championships in the 50 kg category, where she lost to Wu Yu.

Qi competed in the 51 kg category of the 2025 World Boxing Championships held in Liverpool, England. She had defeated Kelsey Oakley in their opening round, Mckenzie Wright in the round of 16 and Laura Fuertes in the quarterfinals. In the semifinals, Qi lost to Alua Balkibekova, winning a bronze medal.
