= Mikiah Kreps =

American boxer (born 1996)

Personal information
- Nationality: American
- Born: July 26, 1996 (age 30) Niagara Falls, United States
- Height: 5’3

Boxing career
- Weight class: Bantamweight, Super-bantamweight

Boxing record
- Total fights: 12
- Wins: 11
- Win by KO: 3
- Losses: 1
Medal record
Women's amateur boxing
Representing the United States
World Championships
Bronze medal – third place	2019 Ulan-Ude	Bantamweight

Mikiah Kreps (born July 26, 1996) is an American boxer. She won a bronze medal in the bantamweight division at the 2019 AIBA Women's World Boxing Championships. Kreps turned professional in 2020, winning her debut pro-fight against Noely Romero by stoppage in the second round on 30 October that year. She faced Ramla Ali for the vacant IBF and WBO female super-bantamweight titles at College Park Center in Arlington, Texas, United States, on November 8, 2026. Kreps lost by split decision with one of the ringside judges scoring the fight 98–91 in her favour, while the other two had it 97–92 and 96–93 respectively for her opponent.
