= Boxing at the 2026 Commonwealth Games – Women's 51 kg =

Boxing competitions

Boxing – Women's 51 kg at the 2026 Commonwealth Games
- Venue: SEC Centre
- Dates: July 27 – 1 August 2026
- Competitors: 13 from 13 nations

Medalists
gold medal	Sakshi Chaudhary	India
silver medal	Ruby White	England
bronze medal	Amber-Jane Wall	Canada
bronze medal	Mischa Aeres	Namibia

The Women's 51 kg boxing competitions at the 2026 Commonwealth Games in Glasgow, Scotland took place between July 27 and August 1 at the SEC Centre.

Like all Commonwealth boxing events, the competition was a straight single-elimination tournament. Both semifinal losers were awarded bronze medals, so no boxers competed again after their first loss. Bouts consisted of three rounds of three minutes each, with one-minute breaks between rounds.

== Schedule ==
The schedule was as follows:

Date	Round
Monday 27 July	Preliminaries
Wednesday 29 July	Quarter-finals
Friday 31 July	Semi-finals
Saturday 1 August	Final

== Results ==
The draw was as follows:

=== Bracket ===
Preliminaries
Ramafu Quaye (GHA)	0
Amber-Jane Wall (CAN)	5
Zinnat Ferdous (BAN)	0
Caitlyn Fryers (NIR)	5
Lethabo Modukanele (BOT)	0
Sakshi Chaudhary (IND)	5
Ruby White (ENG)	5
Thandolwethu Mathiba (RSA)	0
Brooke Neely (SCO)	2
Nadeeka Ranasinghe (SRI)	3

Quarterfinals
Niamh Brooks (WAL)	0
Amber-Jane Wall (CAN)	5
Caitlyn Fryers (NIR)	0
Sakshi Chaudhary (IND)	5
Angel Katushabe (UGA)	0
Ruby White (ENG)	5
Nadeeka Ranasinghe (SRI)	0
Mischa Aeres (NAM)	4

Semifinals
Amber-Jane Wall (CAN)	0
Sakshi Chaudhary (IND)	5
Ruby White (ENG)	RSC
Mischa Aeres (NAM)

Gold medal match
Sakshi Chaudhary (IND)	5
Ruby White (ENG)	0
