= Jennifer Lehane =

Irish boxer (born 1998)

Jennifer Lehane OLY
Personal information
- Born: 19 August 1998 (age 27) Ashbourne, County Meath, Ireland
- Height: 160 cm (5 ft 3 in)
- Weight: Bantamweight

Boxing career
- Stance: Southpaw

Jennifer "Jenny" Lehane OLY (born 19 August 1998) is an Irish amateur boxer. She was the first female bantamweight boxer from her country to take part in an Olympics Games having competed at Paris 2024.

== Biography ==
The fourth oldest of six children, Lehane competed internationally in taekwondo from the age of 15, going on to become European champion in 2018 and 2019.

She took up boxing while studying primary school teaching at Dublin City University and, representing DCU Athletic Boxing Club, won the Irish National Elite Championships in 2021, after which she was asked to join the Irish Amateur Boxing Association High Performance Unit.

Lehane made her international boxing debut for Ireland at the Nicolae Linca Golden Belt tournament in Romania in April 2022, taking home a bronze medal.

Having achieved her degree, Lehane worked for a year in a primary school before putting teaching on hold to focus full-time on boxing.

At the 2023 European Games in Poland she lost in the quarter-finals via split decision to eventual gold medalist Stanimira Petrova from Bulgaria.

Lehane lost in her first contest at the World Boxing Olympic Qualification Tournament 1 in Italy in March 2024, going down on a split decision against French boxer Romane Moulai.

In May 2024, Lehane qualified for the 2024 Summer Olympics at the World Olympic Qualification Tournament 2 in Thailand where she won three fights culminating in a unanimous decision victory over Hungary's Hanna Lakotar in the crucial contest that sealed her place in Paris. She is the first Irish female bantamweight boxer to qualify for an Olympics.

Lehane's Olympic place was officially confirmed when Ireland named their boxing team on 28 June 2024. She was given a bye into the second round where she lost by unanimous decision to 2018 Asian Games gold medalist Chang Yuan from China.

Lehane was selected for the 2025 IBA Women's World Boxing Championships in Niš, Serbia. She lost in the first round to Thailand's Natnicha Chongprongklang.

She was selected to represent Ireland in the 54 kg category at the inaugural World Boxing Championships in Liverpool, England, in September 2025. In her opening bout, Lehane defeated Poland's Wiktoria Rogalinska by unanimous decision. She faced Yoseline Perez from the USA in the second round and lost via unanimous decision.
