= Boxing at the 2026 Commonwealth Games – Women's 54 kg =

Boxing competitions

Boxing – Women's 54 kg at the 2026 Commonwealth Games
- Venue: SEC Centre
- Dates: July 24 – 1 August 2026
- Competitors: 17 from 17 nations

Medalists
gold medal	Preeti Pawar	India
silver medal	Scarlett Delgado	Canada
bronze medal	Lauren Mackie	England
bronze medal	Catherine Mwape	Zambia

The Women's 54 kg boxing competitions at the 2026 Commonwealth Games in Glasgow, Scotland took place between July 24 and August 1 at the SEC Centre.

Like all Commonwealth boxing events, the competition was a straight single-elimination tournament. Both semifinal losers were awarded bronze medals, so no boxers competed again after their first loss. Bouts consisted of three rounds of three minutes each, with one-minute breaks between rounds.

== Schedule ==
The schedule was as follows:

Date	Round
Friday 24 July	Preliminaries
Sunday 26 July	Preliminaries
Tuesday 28 July	Quarter-finals
Friday 31 July	Semi-finals
Saturday 1 August	Final

== Results ==
The draw was as follows:

=== Bracket ===
Preliminaries
24 July
Lauren Mackie (ENG)	5
Amina Faki (KEN)	0

Round of 16
26 July
Monique Suraci (AUS)	2
Lauren Mackie (ENG)	3
26 July
Kadijat Ajishola (NGR)	2
Helen Jones (WAL)	3
26 July
Stephanie Kernachan (SCO)	0
Scarlett Delgado (CAN)	5
26 July
Keatlaretse Modise (BOT)	0
Greer Hall (NZL)	5
26 July
Nicole Clyde (NIR)	5
Nancy Bamfo (GHA)	0
26 July
Preeti Pawar (IND)	RSC
Deborah Mtenje (MAW)
26 July
Marie Gabriel (MRI)	5
Danielle Holland (SAM)	0
26 July
Malaika Zahid (PAK)	1
Catherine Mwape (ZAM)	4

Quarterfinals
28 July
Lauren Mackie (ENG)	5
Helen Jones (WAL)	0
28 July
Scarlett Delgado (CAN)	5
Greer Hall (NZL)	0
28 July
Nicole Clyde (NIR)	0
Preeti Pawar (IND)	5
28 July
Marie Gabriel (MRI)	2
Catherine Mwape (ZAM)	3

Semifinal
31 July
Lauren Mackie (ENG)	1
Scarlett Delgado (CAN)	4
31 July
Preeti Pawar (IND)	5
Catherine Mwape (ZAM)	0

Gold medal match
1 August
Scarlett Delgado (CAN)	0
Preeti Pawar (IND)	5
