= Stoyka Krasteva =

Bulgarian boxer (born 1985)

Personal information
- Nationality: Bulgarian
- Born: Stoyka Zhelyaskova Petrova; September 18, 1985 (age 40) Dobrich, Bulgaria
- Height: 5 ft 4 in (1.63 m)
- Weight: Flyweight

Boxing career
Medal record
Women's amateur boxing
Representing Bulgaria
Olympic Games
Gold medal – first place	2020 Tokyo	Flyweight
World Championships
Silver medal – second place	2016 Astana	Bantamweight
Silver medal – second place	2018 New Delhi	Bantamweight
European Championships
Gold medal – first place	2014 Bucharest	Flyweight
Gold medal – first place	2018 Sofia	Bantamweight
Bronze medal – third place	2011 Rotterdam	Flyweight
World Combat Games
Bronze medal – third place	2013 Saint Petersburg	Flyweight

Stoyka Krasteva (Bulgarian: Стойка Кръстева; born 18 September 1985), née Petrova, is a Bulgarian former boxer who won a gold medal in the women's flyweight division at the 2020 Summer Olympics. She was born in Dobrich, a town in northeastern Bulgaria.

== Career ==
She is the first female boxer who represented Bulgaria in the 2012 Summer Olympics in London in the flyweight division. She lost in the quarterfinals to Great Britain's Nicola Adams 7–16. In end of 2018, Krasteva retired from the sport. Her family, husband and coach to return and in 2020 she returned on the ring. In 2021, Krasteva qualified for the 2020 Summer Olympics in the Women's flyweight category. After 5 consecutive wins she won Bulgaria's first boxing gold medal since 1996, beating top-seeded Buse Naz Çakıroğlu of Turkey 5:0 in the final. In December 2021, Krasteva came second in the Bulgarian Sportsperson of the Year ranking, earning 1241 points.

== Achievements ==
Year	Competition	Venue	Rank	Event
2011	European Championships	Rotterdam, Netherlands	3rd	Flyweight
2014	European Championships	Bucharest, Romania	1st	Flyweight
2016	World Championships	Astana, Kazakhstan	2nd	Bantamweight
2018	European Championships	Sofia, Bulgaria	1st	Bantamweight
2018	World Championships	New Delhi, India	2nd	Bantamweight
2021	Summer Olympics	Tokyo, Japan	1st	Flyweight
