= Sirine Charaabi =

Italian boxer (born 1999)

Personal information
- Nationality: Italy
- Born: 7 May 1999 (age 27) El Fahs, Tunisia
- Height: 1.67 m (5 ft 6 in)
- Weight: Bantamweight; Flyweight

Boxing career
Medal record
Women's amateur boxing
Representing Italy
World Championships
Bronze medal – third place	2025 Liverpool	54 kg
IBA World Championships
Silver medal – second place	2023 New Delhi	Flyweight
Mediterranean Games
Gold medal – first place	2026 Taranto	Bantamweight

Sirine Charaabi (born 7 May 1999) is a boxer who has competed in the bantamweight and flyweight divisions. Born in Tunisia, she represents Italy internationally as an amateur. She is a silver medalist at the IBA World Championships (2023) and a bronze medalist at the World Boxing Championships (2025).

== Early life and career ==
Born in El Fahs, Tunisia, at the age of 18 months, Charaabi joined her father, who worked in the province of Caserta, in Italy. At the age of 5, following her cousin, she joined the Tifata boxing gym in San Prisco, directed by master Giuseppe Perugino. In 2012, she won her first national youth title, while in 2018 she won the silver medal in the final of the Italian Championships.

== Amateur career ==
After enrolling at the University of Naples "L'Orientale", she continued to practice boxing, but only at the national level, as she did not yet have Italian citizenship. She won the gold medal at the 2021 Italian Championships and shortly thereafter obtained Italian citizenship. She was finally able to wear the blue jersey, immediately winning a bronze at the Oxam international tournament and gold at the European Under-22 Championships.

At the 2022 Mediterranean Games in Oran, Algeria, Charaabi lost to Hatice Akbaş, who went on to win the gold medal. In 2023, she won the silver medal when she lost to Wu Yu in the flyweight category at the 2023 Women's World Championships in New Delhi. At the 2023 European Games held at Nowy Targ Arena in Nowy Targ, Poland, she reached the quarter-finals in the women's bantamweight division, where she lost to Akbaş who went on to win a bronze medal. At the 2024 Summer Olympics, she was defeated in the first round of 32 match.

In September 2025, at the World Boxing Championships, Charaabi competed in the 54 kg category. She reached the semifinals where she lost to Yoseline Perez. In August 2026, she competed at the Mediterranean Games and won the gold medal in the bantamweight category.

== In popular culture ==
Charaabi's story inspired the novel Il ring, written by Chiara Lico and published in 2024 by Giunti.
