= Boxing at the 2022 Asian Games – Women's 50 kg =

Asian Games Boxing competitions

Women's 50 kg at the 2022 Asian Games
- Venue: Hangzhou Gymnasium
- Date: 24 September – 3 October 2023
- Competitors: 18 from 18 nations

Medalists
gold medal	Wu Yu	China
silver medal	Chuthamat Raksat	Thailand
bronze medal	Oyuntsetsegiin Yesügen	Mongolia
bronze medal	Nikhat Zareen	India

The women's 50 kilograms event at the 2018 Asian Games took place from 24 September to 3 October 2023 at Hangzhou Gymnasium, Hangzhou, China.

== Schedule ==
All times are China Standard Time (UTC+08:00)

Date	Time	Event
Sunday, 24 September 2023	14:00	Preliminaries – R32
Wednesday, 27 September 2023	14:00	Preliminaries – R16
Friday, 29 September 2023	14:00	Quarterfinals
Sunday, 1 October 2023	14:00	Semifinals
Tuesday, 3 October 2023	14:00	Final

== Results ==
Legend

- RSC — Won by referee stop contest

=== Final ===
Final
Wu Yu (CHN)	5
Chuthamat Raksat (THA)	0

=== Top half ===
Preliminaries – R32
Oyuntsetsegiin Yesügen (MGL)	3
Aira Villegas (PHI)	1

Preliminaries – R16
Zinat Ferdous (BAN)	0
Oyuntsetsegiin Yesügen (MGL)	5
Nazym Kyzaibay (KAZ)	5
Susma Tamang (NEP)	0
Danisha Mathialagan (SGP)	0
Sabina Bobokulova (UZB)	5
Wu Yu (CHN)	5
Kang Su-hyang (PRK)	0

Quarterfinals
Oyuntsetsegiin Yesügen (MGL)	4
Nazym Kyzaibay (KAZ)	0
Sabina Bobokulova (UZB)	0
Wu Yu (CHN)	5

Semifinals
Oyuntsetsegiin Yesügen (MGL)	0
Wu Yu (CHN)	5

=== Bottom half ===
Preliminaries – R32
Nikhat Zareen (IND)	5
Nguyễn Thị Tâm (VIE)	0

Preliminaries – R16
Chuthamat Raksat (THA)	5
Tsukimi Namiki (JPN)	0
Ruhafzo Haqnazarova (TJK)	4
Novita Sinadia (INA)	1
Vilayphone Vongphachan (LAO)
Hanan Nassar (JOR)	RSC
Nikhat Zareen (IND)	5
Bak Cho-rong (KOR)	0

Quarterfinals
Chuthamat Raksat (THA)	5
Ruhafzo Haqnazarova (TJK)	0
Hanan Nassar (JOR)
Nikhat Zareen (IND)	RSC

Semifinals
Chuthamat Raksat (THA)	3
Nikhat Zareen (IND)	2
