= 2025 IBA Women's World Boxing Championships – Flyweight =

Flyweight at the 2025 IBA Women's World Boxing Championships
- Venue: Sportski centar Čair
- Location: Niš, Serbia
- Dates: 10–14 March (preliminaries/semifinals); 16 March (final)
- Competitors: 23 from 23 nations

Medalists
gold medal	Pang Chol-mi	North Korea
silver medal	Buse Naz Çakıroğlu	Turkey
bronze medal	Dragana Jovanović	Serbia
bronze medal	Feruza Kazakova	Uzbekistan

The Flyweight competition at the 2025 IBA Women's World Boxing Championships was held from 10 to 16 March 2025.

== Results ==
=== Finals ===
Semi-finals
(Turkey) Buse Naz Çakıroğlu	RSC
(Serbia) Dragana Jovanović
(Uzbekistan) Feruza Kazakova	0
(North Korea) Pang Chol-mi	5

Final
(Turkey) Buse Naz Çakıroğlu	0
(North Korea) Pang Chol-mi	5

=== Top half ===
==== Section 1 ====
Round of 32
(Moldova) Maia Odajiu
(China) Wei Sitong	RSC

Round of 16
(Turkey) Buse Naz Çakıroğlu	5
(China) Wei Sitong	0
(Mongolia) Chinabatyn Ariunzul	w/o
(Tanzania) Sarafina Fussi

Quarterfinals
(Turkey) Buse Naz Çakıroğlu	RSC
(Mongolia) Chinabatyn Ariunzul

==== Section 2 ====
Round of 32
(South Africa) Thandolwethu Mathiba
(Kenya) Lencer Akinyi	w/o
(Mexico) Esmeralda Patiño	4
(Kazakhstan) Anita Adisheva	3

Round of 16
(Serbia) Dragana Jovanović	RSC
(Kenya) Lencer Akinyi
(Mexico) Esmeralda Patiño	2
(Bulgaria) Venelina Poptoleva	5

Quarterfinals
(Serbia) Dragana Jovanović	5
(Bulgaria) Venelina Poptoleva	0

=== Bottom half ===
==== Section 3 ====
Round of 32
(Romania) Roxana Hamza	RSC
(Zimbabwe) Agnes Kwashi
(Portugal) Rita Soares	1
(Spain) Noelia Gutiérrez	4

Round of 16
(Uzbekistan) Feruza Kazakova	5
(Romania) Roxana Hamza	0
(Spain) Noelia Gutiérrez	0
(Morocco) Imane El Azami	5

Quarterfinals
(Uzbekistan) Feruza Kazakova	5
(Morocco) Imane El Azami	0

==== Section 4 ====
Round of 32
(Haiti) Kathreen Sterling	0
(North Korea) Pang Chol-mi	5
(Russia) Anna Aedma	KO
(Kyrgyzstan) Shakhriza Khalilova

Round of 16
(Vietnam) Trần Thị Linh
(North Korea) Pang Chol-mi	RSC
(Russia) Anna Aedma	4
(Belarus) Yulia Apanasovich	3

Quarterfinals
(North Korea) Pang Chol-mi	4
(Russia) Anna Aedma	1
