= Boxing at the 2022 Mediterranean Games – Women's bantamweight =

Boxing competitions

Women's bantamweight at the 2022 Mediterranean Games
- Venue: EMEC Hall
- Date: 26 June – 1 July
- Competitors: 11 from 11 nations

Medalists
gold medal	Hatice Akbaş	Turkey
silver medal	Bojana Gojković	Montenegro
bronze medal	Fatma Hadjala	Algeria
bronze medal	Yomna Ayyad	Egypt

The women's bantamweight competition of the boxing events at the 2022 Mediterranean Games in Oran, Algeria, was held from 26 June to 1 July at the EMEC Hall.

Like all Mediterranean Games boxing events, the competition was a straight single-elimination tournament. Both semifinal losers were awarded bronze medals, so no boxers competed again after their first loss.

== Results ==
Round of 16
Widad Bertal (MAR)	3
Salma Friga (FRA)	0
Hatice Akbaş (TUR)	3
Amel Chebbi (TUN)	0
Yomna Ayyad (EGY)	RSC
Zeinab Khatoun (LBN)

Quarterfinals
Fatma Hadjala (ALG)	3
Widad Bertal (MAR)	0
Bojana Gojković (MNE)	3
Nikolina Ćaćić (CRO)	0
Sirine Charaabi (ITA)	0
Hatice Akbaş (TUR)	3
Yomna Ayyad (EGY)	ABD
Mamen Madueño (ESP)

Semifinals
Fatma Hadjala (ALG)	0
Bojana Gojković (MNE)	3
Hatice Akbaş (TUR)	3
Yomna Ayyad (EGY)	0

Final
Bojana Gojković (MNE)	0
Hatice Akbaş (TUR)	3
