= Im Ae-ji =

South Korean boxer (born 1999)

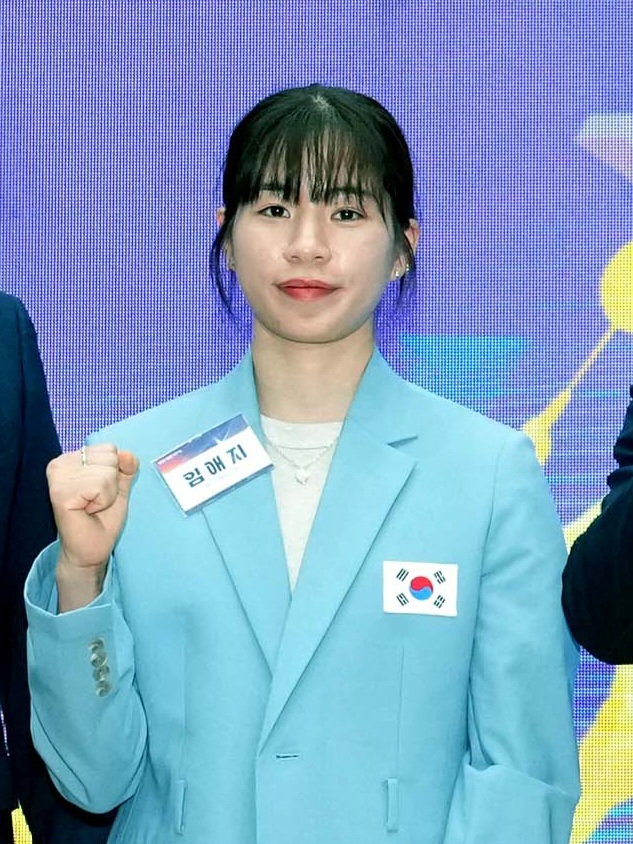
- Im in August 2024

Personal information
- Nationality: South Korea
- Born: May 11, 1999 (age 27) Hwasun, South Korea
- Height: 1.66 m (5 ft 5 in)

Boxing career
- Weight class: Featherweight

Boxing record
- Total fights: 30
- Wins: 17
- Win by KO: 0
- Losses: 13
- Draws: 0
- No contests: 0
Medal record
Representing South Korea
Women's amateur boxing
Olympic Games
Bronze medal – third place	2024 Paris	Bantamweight
World Championships
Bronze medal – third place	2025 Liverpool	54 kg
Asian Championships
Bronze medal – third place	2026 Ulaanbaatar	54kg
AIBA World Junior Championships
Gold medal – first place	2017 Guwahati	Lightweight

- Im Ae-ji
- Hangul: 임애지
- RR: Im Aeji
- MR: Im Aeji

Im Ae-ji (Korean: 임애지; born May 11, 1999) is a South Korean amateur boxer. In 2024, she became the first South Korean woman to win any Olympic medal in boxing.

== Early life and education ==
Im briefly competed as a track and field athlete when she was young and started her boxing career in her second year of middle school, although Im's parents objected her sports career transition. Since her school did not have a boxing club, she trained at the gym she went to, and eventually won in a local competition just one year after starting as a boxer.

Im graduated from Hwasun Elementary School, Hwasun Middle School, Jeonnam Technical Science High School, and Korea National Sport University.

== Career ==
Im debuted on the world stage by winning the gold medal at the 2017 World Youth Women's Boxing Championships in Guwahati, becoming the first Korean female boxer to do so in a world competition.

In 2018, she competed at the Asian Games in Jakarta in the women's featherweight division, but lost in the first round of the competition.

Im qualified for the 2020 Tokyo Olympics by winning bronze medal in the women's featherweight division at the Asia and Oceania qualifiers in Amman in March, but lost 1-4 in the quarter-finals against Australian boxer Skye Nicolson.

In 2022, she competed at the Asian Games in Hangzhou in the women's bantamweight division but lost 0-5 against North Korean boxer Pang Chol-mi.

In 2024, Im lost in the first world qualifier held in Busto Arsizio in March, and as soon as she came back to South Korea, Im went to the selection again and got a ticket to the second world qualifier held in Bangkok in June, with the goal of going to the Olympics. In August, she took the bronze medal at the 2024 Paris Olympics after Im lost 2-3 in the semi-finals of women's bantamweight division against Turkish boxer Hatice Akbaş. In December, she won the bronze medal at the 2024 World Boxing Cup Finals in Sheffield by beating Japanese boxer Mikoto Harada in the quarter-finals of the women's bantamweight division but lost 0-5 against Mongolian boxer Oyuntsetsegiin Yesügen in the semi-finals.

In September 2025, Im secured the bronze medal at the World Boxing Championships in Liverpool after defeating Brazilian boxer Tatiana Chagas by decision in the women's 54kg class quarter-finals.

In April 2026, she secured the bronze medal at the Asian Amateur Boxing Championships in Ulaanbaatar against Japanese boxer Tsukimi Namiki in the women's 54 kg class quarter-finals. In May, Im won the gold medal at the Belgrade World Cup after defeating Turkish boxer Nilay Yaren Cam in a 4-1 decision of the women's 54 kg class finals.

== Personal life ==
Im's family is a sports enthusiast. Her mother Lee Young-ae is a marathon runner and runs a marathon event company, while her younger sister Im Ha-jin is a cross-country runner for the Gyeonggi Provincial Office.

She is a fan of the South Korean boy group Monsta X, and enjoys listening to the group's songs while practicing.

== Recognition ==
=== Awards ===
- 28th Jeollanam-do Residents' Day: Proud Jeonnam People's Award (2024)
- 13th MBN Women's Sports Awards: Fair Play Award (2024)
- 71st Korea Sports Council Awards: Encouragement Award – Sports Category (2025)
- Korea Boxing Association: Best Player Award (2025)

=== Legacy and impact ===
In 2024, Im became the first South Korean boxer to win an Olympic medal in boxing at the Paris Olympics in 12 years after Han Soon-chul at the London Olympics and the first South Korean woman in history. A boxing gymnasium in Hwasun, South Jeolla Province, was also created and named after her.

In 2025, she became the first Korean boxer to win at both the Olympics and the World Championships since Jo Seok-hwan, who won bronze medals at the Sydney Olympics and at the 2003 World Championships, and the first Korean woman in history.

Im was able to increase the international competitiveness of Korean boxing through achieving changes in the weight class of women's boxing in South Korea, as well as making boxing a trend, with the increased number of female club members and gaining popularity among young people, as after-effect of her winning at the Olympics.
