= Zeina Nassar =

German boxer

Personal information
- Nationality: Germany
- Born: Zeina Nassar Berlin, Germany
- Weight: Bantamweight

Boxing career

Boxing record
- Total fights: 35
- Wins: 15
- Win by KO: 1
- Losses: 20

Zeina Nassar is a German professional boxer of Lebanese descent. She is the current Berlin Boxer title-holder and in 2018 she won the German Women's Elite Championship in the ‘up to 57 kg’ weight category. Nassar helped to change the current rules for boxing matches in Germany so that women with headscarves can compete. She became an official Nike Athlete in 2017.

== Early life and education ==
Nassar was born and raised in Berlin, Germany to Lebanese Shiite parents. She first became interested in boxing at 13 after coming across a YouTube video of female boxers. At the time she was in a basketball team and wanted something that showed her “own individual strength.” Nassar is a scholarship holder of the German people and also studies sociology and educational science in Potsdam.

== Career ==
In 2013, Nassar and her coach changed the game by having German competition regulations altered so that women are able to train while wearing headscarves. She won her first title in 2014, becoming the Berlin boxing champion. She is the current the title-holder and has held the title five times in a row. In 2018, she became the first Muslim woman ever to win the German Women's Elite Championship in the ‘up to 57 kg’ weight category. Nassar hopes in the future that she will be able to change the competition rules internationally and at the Olympics.

Nassar had a role in the play ‘Stören’ at the Maxim Gorki Theater in Berlin.
