= Preeti Pawar =

Indian boxer (born 2003)

Personal information
- Full name: Preeti Sai Pawar
- Born: 23 October 2003 (age 23) Bhiwani district, Haryana, India
- Height: 169 cm (5 ft 7 in)

Sport
- Sport: Boxing
- Weight class: 54 kg (119 lb)
Medal record
Women's boxing
Representing India
World Boxing Cup
Gold medal – first place	2025 New Delhi	54 kg
Asian Games
Bronze medal – third place	2022 Hangzhou	54 kg
Commonwealth Games
Gold medal – first place	2026 Glasgow	54 kg
Asian U22 Championships
Gold medal – first place	2024 Astana	54 kg
Asian Elite Championships
Gold medal – first place	2026 Ulaanbaatar	54 kg

Preeti Pawar (born 23 October 2003), also known as Preeti Sai Pawar, is an Indian boxer. She is a Naib Subedar in the Indian Army. She won the gold medal in the women's 54 kg at the 2026 Commonwealth Games and the 2025 World Boxing Cup finals. She has also won the bronze medal in the women's 54 kg event at the 2022 Asian Games.

== Early life ==
Preeti was born in Bhiwani district of Haryana. Her parents, who were former athletes, encouraged her to take up a sporting career. She was introduced to boxing at the age of 14 by her uncle, Vinod Pawar, a former boxer. She trained initially in her uncle's academy in Bhiwani.

In 2025, she was commissioned into the Indian Army as a Naib Subedar.

== Career ==
Preeti won the gold medal at a state level tournament in Panipat, and later won the gold medal in the Youth National Boxing Championships. She won the silver medal at the 2020 Khelo India Youth Games and later won the gold medal in the 2021 edition. She made her debut at the 2023 IBA Women's World Boxing Championships in the bantamweight category. In the 2023 Asian Games at Hangzhou, she defeated two-time Asian Amateur Boxing Champion Zhaina Shekerbekova in the quarter-finals of the 54 kg category. Though she lost in the semi-finals, she won the bronze medal, and secured a quota place for the 2024 Summer Olympics.

In the boxing events at the 2024 Summer Olympics in Paris, Preeti competed in the 54 kg category. She advanced to the round of 16, where she lost to Yeni Arias of Colombia. She had been hospitalized with an illness in the run up to the Olympics, and she had to take a break of nearly two years to recuperate. She returned to competition at the Boxing Federation of India Cup in 2025. She won the gold medal in the 54 kg category in the finals of the 2025 World Boxing Cup in New Delhi.

In the round of 16 of the women's 54 kg event at the Commonwealth Games in Glasgow, she defeated Malawi's Deborah Mtenje by a knockout to advance to the quarter-finals. In the quarter-finals, she defeated Nicole Clyde of Northern Ireland to progress to the semi-finals. In the semi-finals, she defeated Catherine MWape of Zambia to progress to the finals. In the finals, she defeated Scarlett Delgado of Canada by a unanimous decision to win the gold medal.
