= Charley Davison =

British boxer (born 1994)

Charley Davison OLY
Personal information
- Full name: Charley-Sian Taylor Davison
- Nationality: British
- Born: 11 January 1994 (age 32) Lowestoft, Suffolk, England

Boxing career
- Weight class: Flyweight, Bantamweight
- Stance: Southpaw
Medal record
Women's amateur boxing
Representing Great Britain
European Games
Bronze medal – third place	2023 Kraków-Małopolska	Bantamweight

Charley-Sian Taylor Davison OLY (born 11 January 1994) is a British amateur boxer who won a bronze medal at the 2023 European Games.

== Biography ==
Davison started boxing at the age of eight, trained by her father at home because the local boxing club did not accept girls. She fought Ornella Wahner in 2010 and 2011, before taking a seven year break from boxing and then winning the national championship in 2019.

In June 2021, Davison qualified to represent Great Britain at the delayed 2020 Summer Olympics, and reached the final of the 2020 European Boxing Olympic Qualification Tournament by defeating Giordana Sorrentino via unanimous points decision in the semi-final. She lost in the final of the Qualification event to Buse Naz Çakıroğlu by split decision.

At the Olympics in Tokyo, Davison went out in the round-of-16, losing by unanimous decision to China's Yuan Chang.

Davison won a bronze medal in the bantamweight category at the 2023 European Games in Poland and in doing so qualified a quota place for the 2024 Summer Olympics. On 7 June 2024, she was officially announced among the Great Britain squad for the Olympics in Paris. She was drawn to fight 2022 IBA Women's World Boxing Championships gold medalist Hatice Akbaş from Turkey in the first round and lost by a 3:2 split decision.
