= Caroline Cruveillier =

French boxer (born 1998)

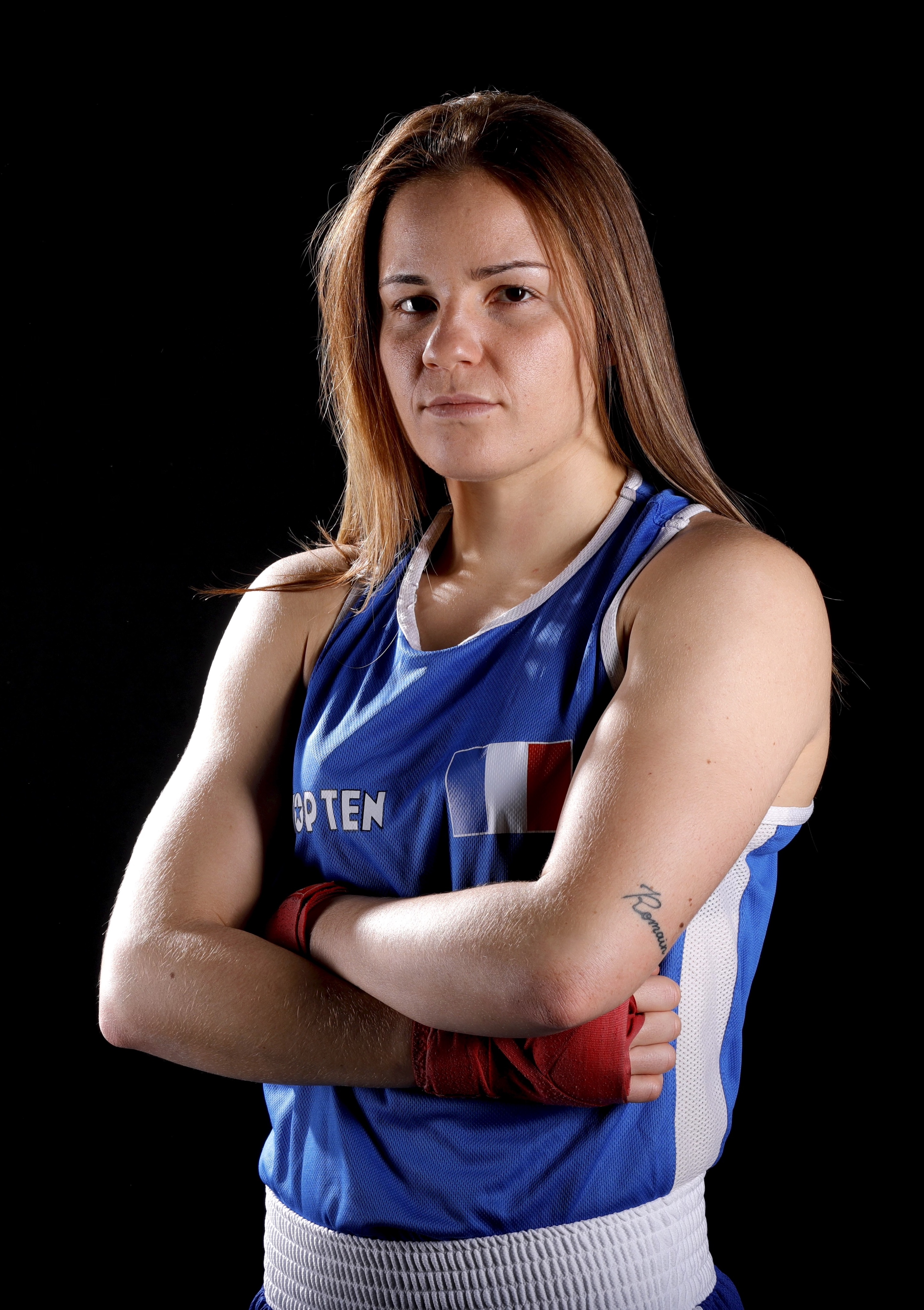

Personal information
- Nationality: French
- Born: 23 March 1998 (age 28)

Boxing career
- Weight class: Bantamweight

Boxing record
- Total fights: 2
- Wins: 2
- Win by KO: 0
- Losses: 0
- Draws: 0
- No contests: 0
Medal record
Women's amateur boxing
Representing France
World Championships
Silver medal – second place	2019 Ulan-Ude	Bantamweight
European Championships
Bronze medal – third place	2019 Alcobendas	Bantamweight

Caroline Cruveillier (born 23 March 1998) is a French boxer.

She won a medal at the 2019 AIBA Women's World Boxing Championships.
