= Sakshi Chaudhary (boxer) =

Indian boxer

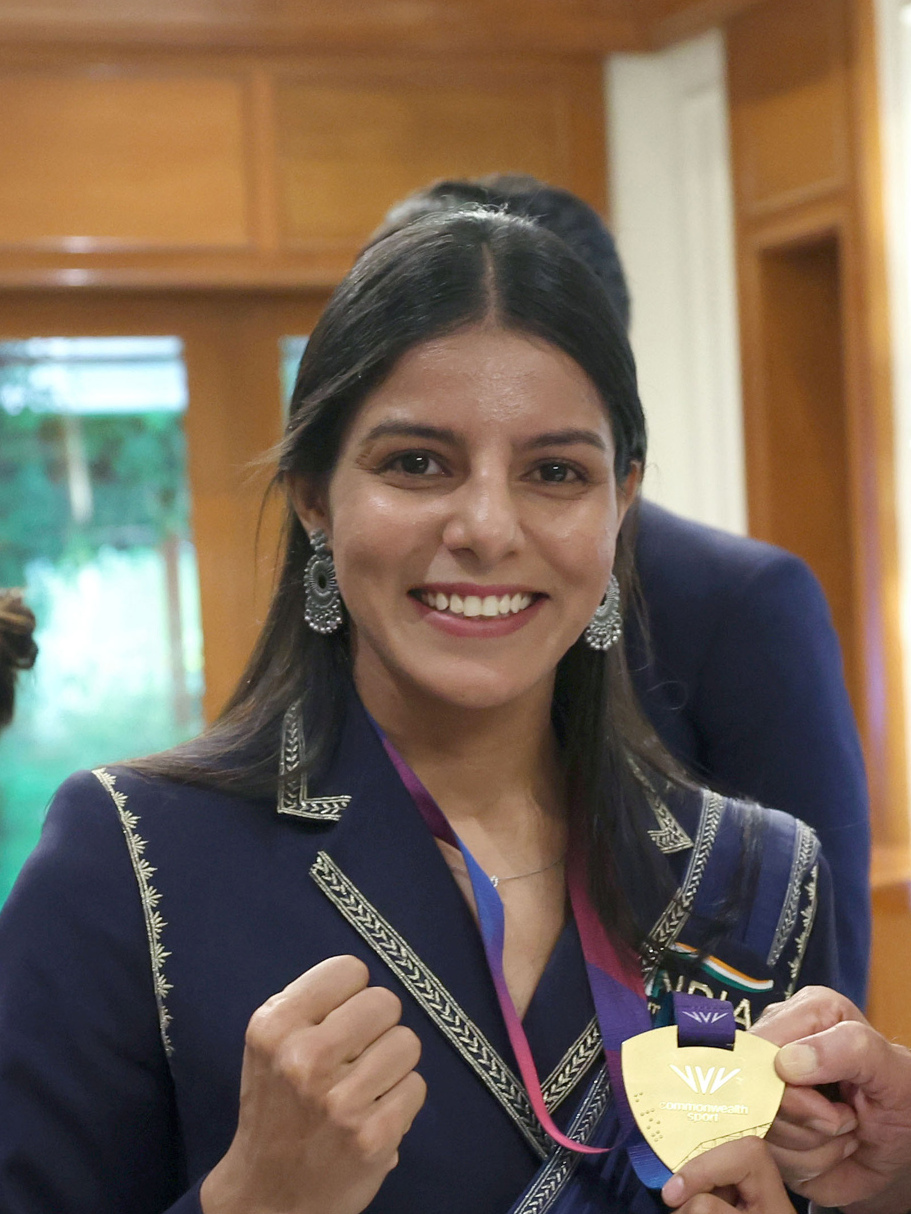
- Chaudhary in 2026

Personal information
- Nationality: Indian
- Born: 9 September 2000 (age 26) Bhiwani district, Haryana, India
- Height: 157 cm (5 ft 2 in) (2026)
- Military career
- Branch: Indian Army
- Rank: Havildar

Sport
- Sport: Boxing
- Weight class: 51 kg (2026)
Medal record
Women's boxing
Representing India
Event	1st	2nd	3rd
Commonwealth Games	1	0	0
World Boxing Cup	1	0	0
Asian Boxing Championships	0	0	1
Youth World Championships	2	0	0
Junior World Championships	1	0	0
Total	5	0	1
Commonwealth Games
Gold medal – first place	2026 Glasgow	51 kg
World Boxing Cup
Gold medal – first place	2025 Astana	54 kg
Asian Boxing Championships
Bronze medal – third place	2021 Dubai	54 kg
Youth World Championships
Gold medal – first place	2017 Guwahati	54 kg
Gold medal – first place	2018 Budapest	57 kg
Junior World Championships
Gold medal – first place	2015 Taipei	54 kg

Sakshi Chaudhary (born 9 September 2000) is an Indian boxer who competes in the 51 kg weight category. She won the gold medal in the 54 kg category at the 2025 World Boxing Cup in Astana. She won the gold medal in the women's 51 kg event at the 2026 Commonwealth Games at Glasgow.

== Early life ==
Sakshi hails from Bhiwani district in Haryana. Her family is engaged in agriculture. She started boxing in 2012 and initially trained under Jagdish Singh. She later moved to train at the Netaji Subhas National Institute of Sports, run by the Sports Authority of India, at Patiala. She is a havildar in the Indian Army.

== Career ==
In May 2015, Chaudhary won the gold medal in the 54 kg weight category at the IBA Youth and Junior World Boxing Championships at Taipei, after beating Yarisel Ramirez in the finals. She won the gold medal in the 2017 AIBA Youth Women's World Boxing Championships at Guwahati after defeating England's Ivy Jane Smith in the final of the bantamweight category. In the 2018 AIBA Youth World Boxing Championships at Budapest, she won the gold medal in the 57 kg weight category, after defeating Croatia's Nikolina Ćaćić in the final. In the 2025 World Boxing Cup at Astana, she won the gold medal in the women's 54 kg category.

Having competed in the 54 kg category earlier, Chaudhary moved to the 51 kg in early 2026, as compatriot Preeti Pawar had already secured the 2026 Commonwealth Games quota in the 54 kg category. In the National trials in the 51 kg category, she defeated the 2022 Commonwealth Games gold-medalist Nikhat Zareen and the 2025 World Boxing Championships gold-medalist Minakshi Hooda to earn her place in the Indian squad for the Commonwealth Games. In the round of 16 of the women's 51 kg event at the Commonwealth Games in Glasgow, she defeated Botswana's Lethabo Modukanele by unanimous decision to advance to the quarter-finals. In the quarter-finals, she defeated Caitlin Fryers of Northern Ireland to progress to the semi-finals. In the semi-finals, she defeated Amber Jane Wall of Canada to progress to the finals. In the finals, she defeated England's Ruby White by a unanimous decision to win the gold medal. This was White's first competitive loss and snapped her 68-game winning streak since her debut in amateur boxing.
