= Hatice Akbaş =

Turkish women's boxer (born 2002)

Personal information
- Nationality: Turkish
- Born: 1 January 2002 (age 24) Ankara, Turkey
- Education: İnönü University
- Height: 1.72 m (5 ft 8 in)
- Weight: 54 kg (119 lb)

Boxing career
- Stance: Southpaw

Boxing record
- Total fights: 37
- Wins: 25
- Win by KO: 4
- Losses: 12
- Draws: 0
- No contests: 0
Medal record
Women's amateur boxing
Representing Turkey
Olympic Games
Silver medal – second place	2024 Paris	Bantamweight
IBA World Championships
Gold medal – first place	2022 Istanbul	Bantamweight
Silver medal – second place	2025 Niš	Bantamweight
European Games
Bronze medal – third place	2023 Kraków-Małopolska	Bantamweight
EB European Championships
Gold medal – first place	2026 Sofia	51 kg
Mediterranean Games
Gold medal – first place	2022 Oran	Bantamweight
European U22 Championships
Gold medal – first place	2022 Poreč	Flyweight

Hatice Akbaş (born 1 January 2002) is a Turkish Olympics silver medalist, world and European champion female boxer competing in the bantamweight (54 kg) division.

== Early years ==
Hatice Akbaş started boxing at her age of nine in the sport hall her father opened in Malatya.

She took the gold medal at the 2016 European Women Youth Boxing Championships in Ordu, Turkey. She became champion in the flyweight (50–52 kg) event at the 2022 European U22 Boxing Championships held in Poreč, Croatia on 22 March 2022.

== Boxing career ==
On 20 May 2022, she won the gold medal in the 54 kg category at the Women's World Championship defeating Romania's Lăcrămioara Perijoc in the bantamweight final in Istanbul, Turkey. At the 2022 Mediterranean Games in Oran, Algeria, she captured the gold medal. She took a bronze medal at the 2023 European Games in Nowy Targ, Poland on 30 June 2023.

Akbaş is a member of Fenerbahçe Boxing.

At the 3rd European Games held at Nowy Targ Arena in Nowy Targ, Poland, she reached the semi-finals in the women's bantamweight division after bypassing the first round, defeating Hungarian Hanna Lakotár 5-0 in the second round and Italian Sirine Charaabi 4-1 in the quarter-finals. She lost to Romanian Lăcrămioara Perijoc 3-2 in the semi-final and won the bronze medal. She won a quota for the 2024 Summer Olympics.

In the round of 32, the first match of the 2024 Summer Olympics, the Great Britain boxer defeated Charley Davison and advanced to the last 16 round. After defeating Australian Tiana Echegaray 5-0 in the last 16 round, Akbaş beat Enkhjargal Munguntsetseg of Mongolia 5-0 in the quarterfinals and reached the final with a 3-2 win over South Korean Im Ae-ji the semifinals. In the final, he lost 5-0 to China's Yuan Chang and won the silver medal.

She won Kyrgyz Miraida Tashpolotova in the first round and Moldovan Iulia Coroli in the last 16 round with RSC, Russian Karina Tazabekova in the quarterfinals and Thai Natnicha Chongprongklang in the semifinals with 4-1 scores and reached the final of the 2025 IBA Women's World Boxing Championships 54 kg in Niš, Serbia. She fought against her Moroccan rival Widad Bertal in the final. Hatice, who won the first round 5-0, lost the next rounds 4-1 and the match 5-2 and won the silver medal as the second in the world.

== Personal life ==
Hatice Akbaş was born in Ankara, Turkey, on 1 January 2002. Her father, Kerem Akbaş, was a Turkish champion boxer in 2010 but gained no international success. She has a sister and an older brother.
