= Natnicha Chongprongklang =

Thai boxer (born 2004)

Personal information
- Nickname: Focus
- Nationality: Thailand
- Born: 8 February 2004 (age 22) Nakhon Ratchasima, Thailand

Boxing career
- Stance: Southpaw
Medal record
Boxing
Representing Thailand
Asian Games
Gold medal – first place	2026 Aichi–Nagoya	Bantamweight
SEA Games
Gold medal – first place	33rd SEA Games	Bantamweight

Natnicha Chongprongklang (Thai: ณัฐนิชา จงโปร่งกลาง, born February 8, 2004) is a Thai boxer of Thai–New Zealand descent who competed at the 2026 Asian Games.

== Early life and career ==
Raised and trained at Nakhon Ratchasima Sports School in Nakhon Ratchasima, where her maternal family is from Kham Sakaesaeng district. She pursued a career in boxing with the aim of earning income to support her grandmother and mother, who raised her.

Natnicha gradually made a name for herself at the youth level before moving up to international competition and joining the Thailand national team. In recent years, she has achieved a series of notable results, including a gold medal at the 2025 Asian U22 Boxing Championships, a gold medal at the 2025 Southeast Asian Games, and a gold medal at the 2026 Eindhoven Box Cup.

At the 2026 Asian Games, her first appearance at the Games, she competed in the women's bantamweight division (54 kg). In the final, she defeated the defending champion in the division from the 2022 Asian Games, Pang Chol-mi of North Korea, by a 4–1 decision after three rounds. She became the first Thai female boxer to win an Asian Games gold medal and the only member of the Thai national boxing team to win a medal at these Games.
