= Lăcrămioara Perijoc =

Romanian boxer (born 1994)

Personal information
- Full name: Lenuța Lăcrămioara Perijoc
- Nationality: Romanian
- Born: 3 February 1994 (age 32) Siret

Sport
- Sport: Boxing
Medal record
Women's amateur boxing
Representing Romania
World Championships
Silver medal – second place	2022 Istanbul	Bantamweight
European Championships
Gold medal – first place	2019 Alcobendas	Bantamweight
Silver medal – second place	2024 Belgrade	Bantamweight
European Games
Silver medal – second place	2023 Kraków-Małopolska	Bantamweight

Lenuța Lăcrămioara Perijoc (born 3 February 1994) is a Romanian boxer. She competed in the women's bantamweight event at the 2024 Summer Olympics.
