= Chang Yuan =

Chinese boxer (born 1997)

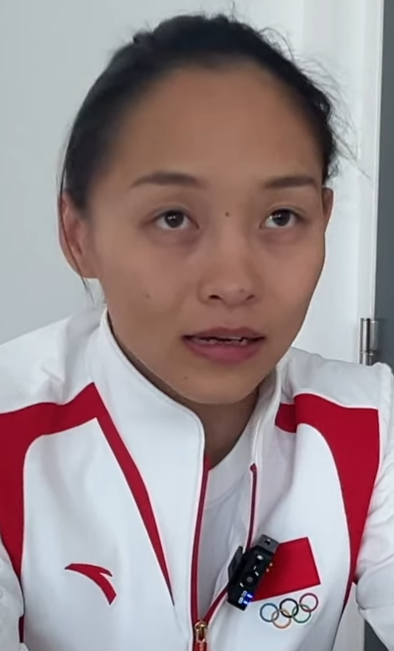
- Chang in 2024

Personal information
- Nationality: Chinese
- Born: 24 June 1997 (age 29) Shijiazhuang, Hebei, China
- Height: 165 cm (5 ft 5 in)

Boxing career
- Weight class: Flyweight
- Stance: Southpaw

Boxing record
- Total fights: 52
- Wins: 40
- Win by KO: 2
- Losses: 12
Medal record
Women's amateur boxing
Representing China
Olympic Games
Gold medal – first place	2024 Paris	Bantamweight
Youth Olympic Games
Gold medal – first place	2014 Nanjing	Flyweight
Asian Games
Gold medal – first place	2018 Jakarta-Palembang	Flyweight
Silver medal – second place	2022 Hangzhou	Bantamweight

Chang Yuan (Chinese: 常园; pinyin: Cháng Yuán, born 24 June 1997) is a Chinese amateur boxer. On 8 August 2024, she defeated Turkish boxer Hatice Akbaş by 5-0 to win the gold medal in women's 54 kg boxing at the 2024 Summer Olympics, thus becoming the first ever Chinese female boxer to win a gold medal at any Olympics.

She also won the gold medal at the 2014 Youth Olympic Games and the gold medal at the 2018 Asian Games.
