= Nikhat Zareen =

Indian boxer (born 1996)

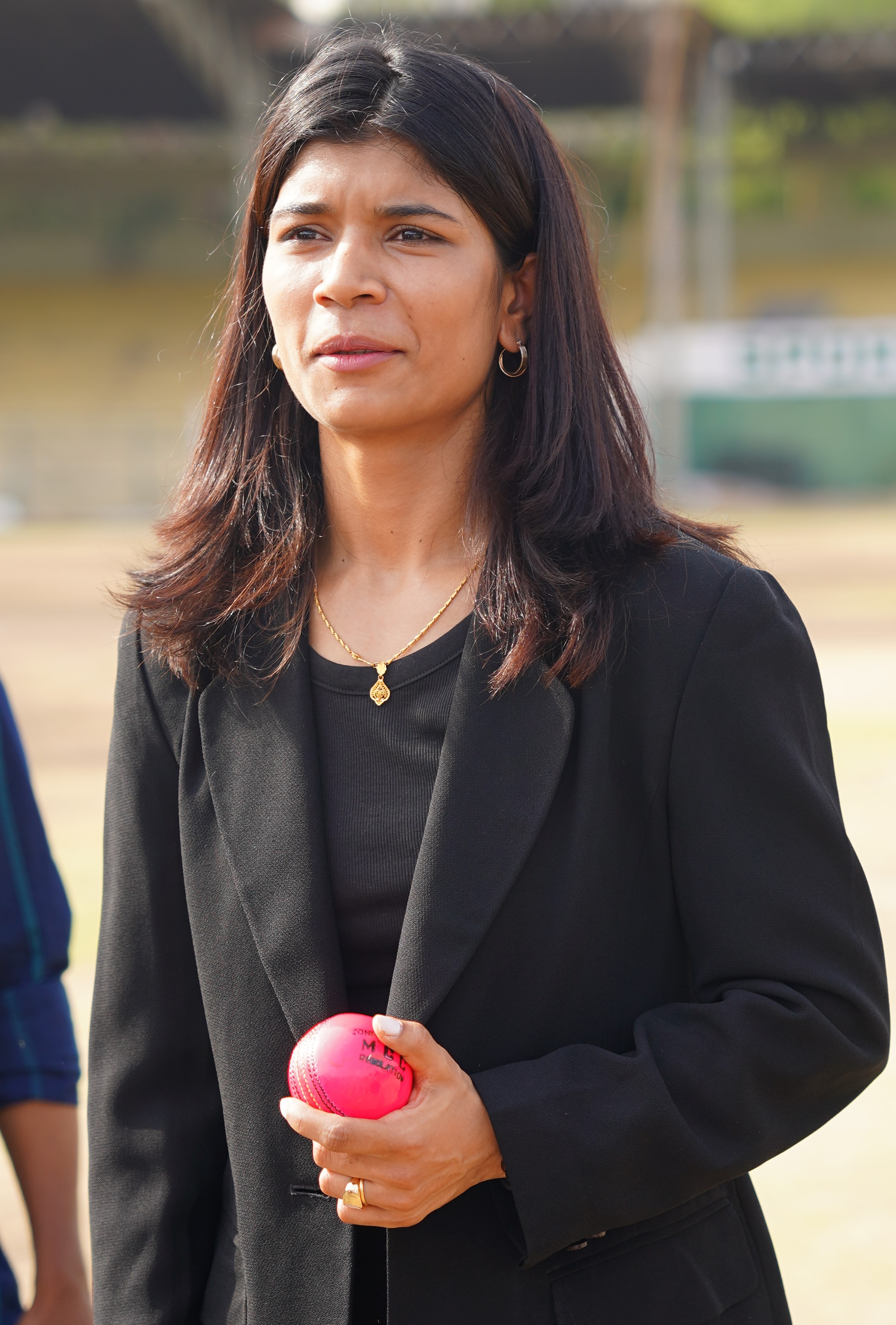
- Zareen in 2022

Personal information
- Born: 14 June 1996 (age 30) Nizamabad, Andhra Pradesh (now in Telangana), India

Sport
- Sport: Boxing
- Weight class: Flyweight and Light flyweight
Medal record
Women's amateur boxing
Representing India
| Event | 1st | 2nd | 3rd |
|---|---|---|---|
| World Championships | 2 | 0 | 0 |
| World Cup | 1 | 0 | 0 |
| Commonwealth Games | 1 | 0 | 0 |
| Asian Games | 0 | 0 | 1 |
| Asian Championships | 0 | 0 | 1 |
| Junior World Championships | 1 | 1 | 0 |
| Total | 5 | 1 | 2 |
World Championships
| Gold medal – first place | 2022 Istanbul | Flyweight |
| Gold medal – first place | 2023 New Delhi | Light flyweight |
World Cup
| Gold medal – first place | 2025 New Delhi | Flyweight |
Commonwealth Games
| Gold medal – first place | 2022 Birmingham | Light flyweight |
Asian Games
| Bronze medal – third place | 2022 Hangzhou | Light flyweight |
Asian Championships
| Bronze medal – third place | 2019 Bangkok | Flyweight |
Asian Elite Championships
| Bronze medal – third place | 2026 Ulaanbaatar | 51 kg |
Junior World Championships
| Gold medal – first place | 2011 Turkey | Flyweight |
| Silver medal – second place | 2014 Bulgaria | Flyweight |

Nikhat Zareen (born 14 June 1996) is an Indian amateur boxer. She is a two-time world champion having won gold medals at the 2022 and the 2023 edition. Zareen has also won gold at the 2022 Commonwealth Games and bronze at the 2022 Asian Games.

== Background ==
Zareen was born on 14 June 1996 to mother Parveen Sultana and father Mohammad Jameel Ahmed in Nizamabad, then part of Andhra Pradesh. She finished her schooling from Nirmala Hrudaya Girls High School in Nizamabad. She then pursued Bachelor of Arts at AV College, Hyderabad.

In 2021, Zareen was appointed the staff officer in the Bank of India, zonal office at AC Guards, Hyderabad. In September 2024, she was appointed as Deputy Superintendent of Police in Telangana Police.

== Career ==
Zareen was introduced to boxing by her father, Mohammad Jameel Ahmed, on the recommendation of Omkar Yadav, the boxing coach at the LB Stadium Hyderabad. She trained under him for a year. She was inducted into the Sports Authority of India in Vishakhapatnam to train under Dronacharya awardee, IV Rao in 2009. A year later, she was declared as the 'golden best boxer' at the Erode Nationals in 2010.

=== Junior World Championships (2011–2015) ===
She won gold medal in the flyweight division held at the AIBA Women's Junior and Youth World Boxing Championship in Turkey. Zareen was up against Turkish boxer Ulku Demir and after three rounds won the bout 27–16.

She won a silver medal in the Youth World Boxing Championship held in Bulgaria in 2014.

She then won a gold medal at the third Nations Cup International Boxing Tournament held in Novi Sad, Serbia on 12 January 2014. Zareen defeated Paltceva Ekaterina of Russia in the 51 kg weight category.

She won a gold medal at 16th Senior Woman National Boxing Championship at Assam,

=== International tournament victories (2016–2022) ===
She won a silver medal at Thailand Open International Boxing Tournament held in Bangkok.

She won a gold medal at Strandja Memorial Boxing Tournament held in Sofia, Bulgaria.

Zareen defeated Ukraine's Tetiana Kob, a three-time European Championships medallist 4–1 to clinch a gold medal at the 73rd Strandja Memorial Boxing Tournament in Sofia, Bulgaria. The women's team was led by coach Bhaskar Bhatt. She also beat Tokyo Olympics silver medallist Buse Naz Çakıroğlu in the semi-finals.

=== World Boxing Championships & Commonwealth Games (2022–2024) ===
On 19 May 2022, Zareen won the gold medal in the 52 kg category at the Women's World Championship defeating Thailand's Jitpong Jutamas in the fly-weight final in Istanbul, Turkey. Zareen became the fifth Indian women's boxer to win a gold medal at the World Championships, joining Mary Kom, Laishram Sarita Devi, Jenny R. L., and Lekha K. C. She was only the second Indian boxer to win a World Championships Gold Medal abroad (outside India) after M.C. Mary Kom, who did it four times out of her six gold medals.

Zareen won the third gold medal for India in the Commonwealth Games 2022 in Birmingham after defeating Carly McNaul of Northern Ireland by 5–0 on 7 August 2022 in the 48–50 kg category (light flyweight category).

Nikhat won 2nd world championship gold medal in 2023 New Delhi IBA Women's world boxing championships after defeating Vietnam's Nguyen Thi Tam by 5-0 unanimous decision in the 48–50 kg category on 26 March 2023.

Zareen who entered the Olympics unseeded, defeated Maxi Carina Kloetzer 5–0 in the women's 50 kg boxing round of 32 and proceeded to the pre-quarterfinal. She lost the round of 16 bout to Chinese world number 1 Wu Yu in a unanimous defeat of 5–0.

== Achievements ==
International Titles
| Year | Place | Weight | Competition | Location |
|---|---|---|---|---|
| 2011 | 1st place, gold medalist(s) | 48 | AIBA Women's Junior and Youth World Boxing Championship | Turkey |
| 2014 | 2nd place, silver medalist(s) | 45–48 | Youth World Boxing Championship | Bulgaria |
| 2014 | 1st place, gold medalist(s) | 51 | Nations Cup International Boxing Tournament | Novi Sad, Serbia |
| 2018 | 1st place, gold medalist(s) | 51 | 56th Belgrade International Championship | Belgrade, Serbia |
| 2019 | 3rd place, bronze medalist(s) | 51 | Asian Championships | Bangkok, Thailand |
| 2019 | 2nd place, silver medalist(s) | 51 | Thailand Open International Boxing Tournament | Bangkok, Thailand |
| 2019 | 1st place, gold medalist(s) | 51 | Strandja Memorial Boxing Tournament | Sofia, Bulgaria |
| 2021 | 3rd place, bronze medalist(s) | 51 | Istanbul Bosphorus Boxing Tournament | Istanbul, Turkey |
| 2022 | 1st place, gold medalist(s) | 51 | Strandja Memorial Boxing Tournament | Sofia, Bulgaria |
| 2022 | 1st place, gold medalist(s) | 52 | IBA Women's World Boxing Championships | Istanbul, Turkey |
| 2022 | 1st place, gold medalist(s) | 50 | XXII Commonwealth Games | Birmingham, England |
| 2023 | 1st place, gold medalist(s) | 50 | IBA Women's World Boxing Championships | New Delhi, India |

== Brand endorsements ==
In 2018, Zareen signed a brand endorsement deal with Adidas. Zareen is supported by the Welspun group and is included in the Target Olympic Podium Scheme of Sports Authority of India.

== Awards ==
- Nikhat was appointed the official ambassador of her home town Nizamabad, Telangana.
- Best Boxer in the All India Inter-University Boxing Championship, Jalandhar, Punjab - February 2015
- JFW award for Excellence in Sports 2019.
- Arjuna Award 2022
