= Yeni Arias =

Colombian boxer (born 1990)

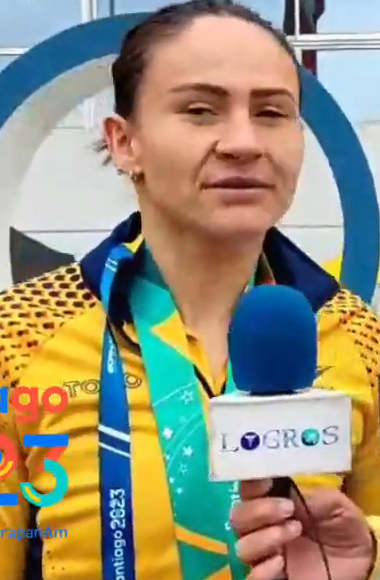
- Arias in 2023

Personal information
- Full name: Yeni Marcela Arias Castañeda
- Born: 23 December 1990 (age 35) Riosucio, Caldas, Colombia
- Height: 1.59 m (5 ft 3 in)
- Weight: 57 kg (126 lb)

Sport
- Sport: Boxing
- Weight class: Bantamweight
Medal record
Women's amateur boxing
Representing Colombia
Event	1st	2nd	3rd
World Championships	0	1	0
Pan American Games	1	0	1
CAC Games	1	1	0
South American Games	0	2	0
Bolivarian Games	2	1	0
Total	4	5	1
World Championships
Silver medal – second place	2023 New Delhi	Bantamweight
Pan American Games
Gold medal – first place	2023 Santiago	Bantamweight
Bronze medal – third place	2019 Lima	Bantamweight
Central American and Caribbean Games
Gold medal – first place	2023 San Salvador	Bantamweight
Silver medal – second place	2018 Barranquilla	Bantamweight
South American Games
Silver medal – second place	2018 Cochabamba	Lightweight
Silver medal – second place	2022 Asunción	Featherweight
Bolivarian Games
Gold medal – first place	2017 Santa Marta	Lightweight
Gold medal – first place	2022 Valledupar	Featherweight
Silver medal – second place	2013 Trujillo	Light welterweight

Yeni Marcela Arias Castañeda (Note: In this Spanish name, the first or paternal surname is Arias and the second or maternal family name is Castañeda.) (born 23 December 1990) is a Colombian boxer. She competed in the women's featherweight event at the 2020 Summer Olympics. Arias also competed for Colombia at the 2024 Summer Olympics in the women's 54 kg event.
