= Johana Gómez (boxer) =

Venezuelan boxer (born 1997)

Personal information
- Born: 22 June 1997 (age 29) Caracas, Venezuela

Sport
- Sport: Boxing

Johana Carolína Gómez Landaeta (born 22 June 1997) is a Venezuelan boxer. She is the current and ten-time Venezuelan featherweight amateur champion.

== Career ==
Gómez was a football player until she was injured in a car accident. She began training in boxing after this, and made her amateur debut in 2018. Scottish boxing coach Gary Young saw some clips of her on Instagram and reached out, offering to train her; Gómez trains with Young via video call while still based in La Guaira. Her journey to the 2024 Summer Olympics is the subject of a British short documentary film, Little Warrior; Gómez has said she would like to represent her country at the Olympics before accepting a professional contract. Living in poverty, Young sends her a stipend, and Gómez has expressed the belief that her family will be supported by the Venezuelan government if she wins an Olympic gold medal.
