= Dina Zholaman =

Kazakh boxer

Personal information
- Nationality: Kazakhstan

Boxing career
Medal record
Boxing
Representing Kazakhstan
World Championships
Gold medal – first place	2016 Astana	Bantamweight
Bronze medal – third place	2022 Istanbul	Bantamweight

Dina Zholaman is a Kazakh boxer. She competed at the 2016 AIBA Women's World Boxing Championships, winning the gold medal in the bantamweight category. She also competed at the 2022 IBA Women's World Boxing Championships, winning the bronze medal in the bantamweight event.
