= Sara Ćirković =

Serbian boxer (born 2004)

Personal information
- Nationality: Serbia
- Born: Sara Ćirković; 29 April 2004 (age 22) Zvornik, Bosnia and Herzegovina

Sport
- Country: Serbia
- Sport: Boxing
Medal record
Women's amateur boxing
Representing Serbia
World Championships (IBA)
Bronze medal – third place	2025 Niš	Bantamweight
European Championships
Gold medal – first place	2024 Belgrade	Bantamweight
Gold medal – first place	2026 Sofia	54 kg
Mediterranean Games
Bronze medal – third place	2026 Taranto	Bantamweight
Youth World Championships
Gold medal – first place	2022 La Nucia	Light Flyweight

Sara Ćirković (born 29 April 2004) is a Serbian boxer. She lives in Bratunac, and trains at the Obilić TRB Boxing Club in Zvornik.

She represented Serbia at the 2024 Summer Olympics, where she lost to Thai boxer Jutamas Jitpong in the women's 54kg boxing tournament. She made her professional debut on 27 April 2025 against Romane Moulai, winning by judge's decision.

She won a gold medal at the 2026 European Boxing Championships.
