= Pang Chol-mi =

North Korean boxer (born 1994)

Personal information
- Nationality: North Korean
- Born: 26 August 1994 (age 32) Chongju, North Korea
- Height: 1.67 m (5 ft 6 in)

Boxing career
- Weight class: Flyweight; Bantamweight

Boxing record
- Total fights: 17
- Wins: 14
- Win by KO: 0
- Losses: 3
- Draws: 0
- No contests: 0
Medal record
Women's amateur boxing
Representing North Korea
Olympic Games
Bronze medal – third place	2024 Paris	Bantamweight
World Championships
Gold medal – first place	2018 New Delhi	Flyweight
Gold medal – first place	2025 Niš	Flyweight
Bronze medal – third place	2019 Ulan-Ude	Flyweight
Asian Games
Gold medal – first place	2022 Hangzhou	Bantamweight
Silver medal – second place	2026 Aichi–Nagoya	Bantamweight
Silver medal – second place	2018 Jakarta–Palembang	Flyweight
Asian Championships
Gold medal – first place	2019 Bangkok	Flyweight
Silver medal – second place	2017 Ho Chi Minh City	Flyweight

Pang Chol-mi (born 26 August 1994) is a North Korean boxer.

== Career ==
She won a medal at the 2019 AIBA Women's World Boxing Championships. In 2024, she became the first North Korean woman to win any Olympic medal in boxing, winning a bronze medal. She won a gold medal at the 2025 IBA Women's World Boxing Championships.

At the 2026 Asian Games, where she was the defending champion in the bantamweight (54 kg) division, she defeated all of her opponents in the earlier rounds by unanimous 5–0 decisions. In the final, she faced Natnicha Chongprongklang of Thailand. She outscored her opponent in the first two rounds and scored an eight-count in the second round, but lost the final round. She ultimately had to settle for the silver medal after losing the bout by a 4–1 decision. Following the bout, both she and her coach protested the decision, and she made her protest visibly known while standing on the medal podium.
