= Stanimira Petrova =

Bulgarian boxer (born 1990)

Personal information
- Nationality: Bulgaria
- Born: Станимира Петрова; 16 December 1990 (age 35) Asenovgrad, Bulgaria

Sport
- Sport: Boxing
Medal record
Women's amateur boxing
Representing Bulgaria
Event	1st	2nd	3rd
World Championships	1	0	0
European Championships	2	0	2
European Games	2	0	0
Total	5	0	2
World Championships
Gold medal – first place	2014 Jeju	Bantamweight
European Games
Gold medal – first place	2019 Minsk	Featherweight
Gold medal – first place	2023 Kraków-Małopolska	Bantamweight
European Championships
Gold medal – first place	2016 Sofia	Bantamweight
Gold medal – first place	2018 Sofia	Featherweight
Bronze medal – third place	2019 Alcobendas	Featherweight
Bronze medal – third place	2022 Budva	Bantamweight

Stanimira Petrova (Bulgarian: Станимира Петрова) (born 16 December 1990) is a Bulgarian female boxer.

She competed in three successive Olympic Games, at the 2016 Summer Olympics in Rio de Janeiro, 2020 Summer Olympics in Tokyo and at the 2024 Summer Olympics in Paris.

She won a gold medal in bantamweight at the 2014 AIBA Women's World Boxing Championships.

Petrova is also two-time European champion and two-time European Games gold medallist.
