= Wu Yu (boxer) =

Chinese boxer (born 1995)

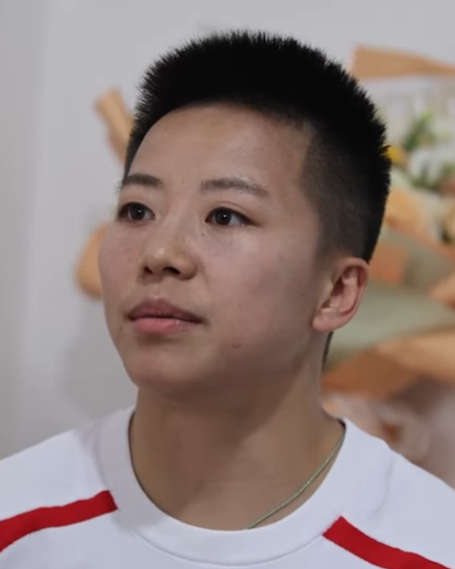
- Wu in 2024

Personal information
- Nationality: Chinese
- Born: 13 January 1995 (age 31) Guiding County, Qiannan Buyei and Miao Autonomous Prefecture, Guizhou, China
- Height: 160 cm (5 ft 3 in)

Boxing career
- Weight class: Flyweight
- Stance: Orthodox

Boxing record
- Total fights: 35
- Wins: 31
- Win by KO: 0
- Losses: 4
- Draws: 0
- No contests: 0
Medal record
Women's amateur boxing
Representing China
Olympic Games
Gold medal – first place	2024 Paris	Flyweight
World Championships
Gold medal – first place	2023 New Delhi	Flyweight
World Military Boxing Championships
Gold medal – first place	2019 Wuhan	Flyweight
Asian Games
Gold medal – first place	2022 Hangzhou	50 kg
Gold medal – first place	2026 Aichi–Nagoya	51 kg

Wu Yu (Chinese: 吴愉; pinyin: Wú Yú, born 13 January 1995) is a Chinese boxer. She won the gold medal in Women's 50kg event at the 2024 Summer Olympics.

== Career ==
She won a gold medal at the 2023 AIBA Women's World Boxing Championships.

On 9 August 2024, she won the gold medal in Women's 50 kg at the 2024 Summer Olympics, defeating Turkish boxer Buse Naz Çakıroğlu by 4–1 in the final. She is China's second woman boxer to have become an Olympic champion; Chang Yuan was the first.

== Personal life ==
Wu has been described as being a sergeant in the Chinese military.
