= Oyuntsetsegiin Yesügen =

Mongolian boxer

Personal information
- Born: 21 March 2001 (age 25) Ulaanbaatar, Mongolia
- Weight: Flyweight

Boxing career
- Stance: Orthodox
Medal record
Women's amateur boxing
Representing Mongolia
Asian Games
| Bronze medal – third place | 2022 Hangzhou | Light flyweight |
Asian Championships
| Bronze medal – third place | 2022 Amman | Bantamweight |

Oyuntsetsegiin Yesügen (Mongolian: Оюунцэцэгийн Есүгэн; born 21 March 2001) is a Mongolian boxer. She qualified for the 2024 Summer Olympics and was named the Mongolian flagbearer.

== Biography ==
Yesügen was born in Ulaanbaatar, Mongolia. She grew up in Javkhlant, Selenge, and was introduced to boxing by O. Boldbaatar in middle school. She joined the "Red Panther" (Улаан ирвис) boxing club in Selenge and began training consistently starting in 2016; her parents initially objected, declaring that boxing was "not a sport suitable for girls", but eventually supported her due to her dedication, as she trained two hours per day even when not preparing for fights.

Yesügen, a flyweight, rose through the Mongolian boxing ranks and became a two-time state champion, later making the national team. She competed at an amateur level at several international competitions, including the Asian Youth Games. She competed at the senior level for the first time in 2021, at a tournament in the Czech Republic, and won a gold medal. She competed in the 2022 IBA Women's World Boxing Championships and placed fifth, losing the bronze medal match 3–2 to the Thai boxer Preedakamon Tintabthai.

Yesügen made her professional debut in July 2022, defeating Michidmaa Erdendedalai by split decision. In November 2022, she won a bronze medal at the 2022 Asian Amateur Boxing Championships. The following month, she won her first professional title, defeating Akane Fujiwara of Japan for the WBO Asia Pacific Super Bantamweight title. In March 2023, she competed at the 2023 IBA Women's World Boxing Championships in the flyweight division. Later that year, she competed at the Asian Games in the light flyweight division, defeating World Champion Nazym Kyzaibay to win a bronze medal. She became the first boxing medalist at the Asian Games for Mongolia and rose to a global ranking of 30th in her division. Her performance also qualified her for the 2024 Summer Olympics. By May 2024, Yesügen was ranked the number one female Mongolian boxer and had compiled a career record of 25 wins and 6 losses. She ultimately was one of 33 Mongolians selected for the 2024 Olympics and was named her nation's flagbearer at the opening ceremony.
