= Huang Hsiao-wen =

Taiwanese boxer (born 1997)

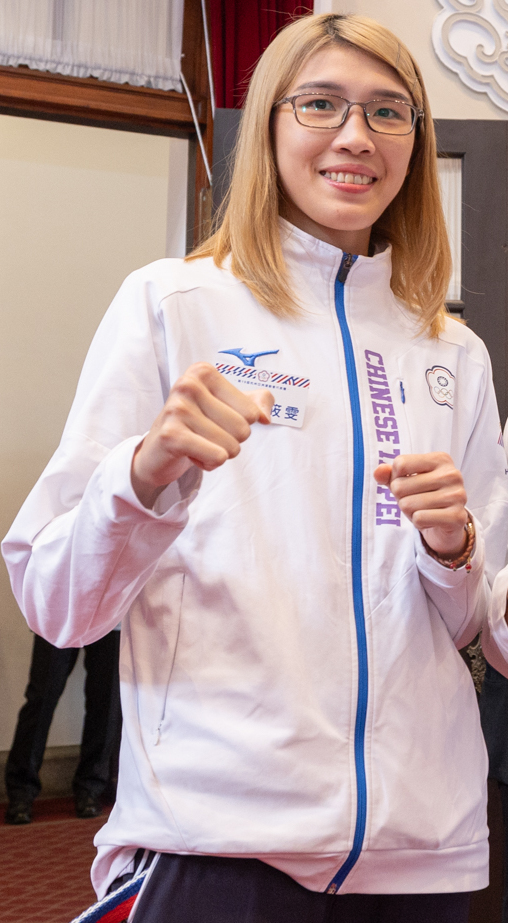
- Huang in 2023

Personal information
- Born: 31 August 1997 (age 29) Taipei, Taiwan

Boxing career
- Weight class: Bantamweight
Medal record
Women's amateur boxing
Representing Chinese Taipei
Olympic Games
Bronze medal – third place	2020 Tokyo	Flyweight
World Championships
Gold medal – first place	2025 Liverpool	54 kg
AIBA World Championships
Gold medal – first place	2019 Ulan-Ude	Bantamweight
Gold medal – first place	2023 New Delhi	Bantamweight
Asian Games
Bronze medal – third place	2018 Jakarta-Palembang	Featherweight
Asian Championships
Silver medal – second place	2019 Bangkok	Bantamweight
Bronze medal – third place	2017 Ho Chi Minh City	Featherweight
Bronze medal – third place	2022 Amman	Bantamweight

Huang Hsiao-wen (Chinese: 黃筱雯; pinyin: Huáng Xiǎowén; born 31 August 1997) is a Taiwanese boxer. She is a three-time world champion having won gold medals in the bantamweight division at the 2019 and 2023 IBA Women's World Championships and in the 54 kg category at the 2025 World Boxing Championships. Huang also won a bronze medal competing at flyweight at the delayed 2020 Tokyo Olympics.
