= 2025 World Boxing Cup =

World boxing tournament

- Venue: (Brazil) Rafain Palace Hotel and Convention (Kazakhstan) Zhaksylyk Ushkempirov Palace (India) Shaheed Vijay Singh Pathik Sports Complex
- Location: (Brazil) Foz do Iguaçu (Kazakhstan) Astana (India) New Delhi
- Dates: (Brazil) 31 March – 5 April (Kazakhstan) 30 June – 7 July (India) 15 – 22 November
- Competitors: 500+ from 38 nations

The 2025 World Boxing Cup was held from 31 March to 22 November 2025. Hosted by World Boxing, it was the first edition of the World Boxing Cup. There were ten weight categories for men and women competing from 19 countries. The first stage was held in Foz do Iguaçu, Brazil. The second stage was held in Astana, Kazakhstan, while the finals were held in New Delhi, India.

During stage one, boxers from nine countries won at least one gold. Uzbekistan topped the table with a total of 8 medals, 5 of which were gold. India won 6 via their men's team. Their women's team did not participate. Stage two saw host Kazakhstan dominate with Brazil and India next in most medals. India dominated the final leg, raking in 20 medals with 9 gold, 6 silver and 5 bronze.

== Editions ==
Stage	Host	Dates	Ref
I	(Brazil) Foz do Iguaçu	March 31 – April 5	
II	(Kazakhstan) Astana	30 June – 7 July	
Finals	(India) Greater Noida	15 – 22 November	

== Medal table ==
Rank	Nation	Gold	Silver	Bronze	Total
1	India	13	12	15	40
2	Kazakhstan	12	5	13	30
3	Uzbekistan	9	7	9	25
4	Brazil	7	4	5	16
5	Poland	3	5	8	16
6	England	3	4	10	17
7	Australia	2	2	4	8
8	Norway	2	0	0	2
9	Italy	1	5	3	9
10	Chinese Taipei	1	2	4	7
10	Japan	1	2	4	7
12	France	1	1	6	8
13	Argentina	1	0	0	1
13	Finland	1	0	0	1
15	Turkey	0	2	6	8
15	United States	0	2	6	8
17	Germany	0	1	2	3
18	Bulgaria	0	1	1	2
18	Kyrgyzstan	0	1	1	2
18	Mongolia	0	1	1	2
18	Nigeria	0	1	1	2
22	Philippines	0	1	0	1
23	Azerbaijan	0	0	3	3
24	Dominican Republic	0	0	1	1
24	Guatemala	0	0	1	1
Totals (25 entries)		57	59	104	220

== Stage I ==
=== Men ===
Event	Gold	Silver	Bronze
47–50 kg	(Uzbekistan) Asilbek Jalilov	(France) Nikee Cummings	(India) Jadumani Singh (Poland) Jakub Słomiński
50–55 kg	(Kazakhstan) Nursultan Altynbek	(Uzbekistan) Mirazizbek Mirzakhalilov	(India) Manish Rathore (Guatemala) José Felipe Mijangos
55–60 kg	(Brazil) Luiz Gabriel Oliveira	(Poland) Paweł Brach	(India) Sachin Siwach (Uzbekistan) Madiyar Daniyarov
60–65 kg	(Brazil) Yuri Falcão	(India) Abhinash Jamwal	(England) Patris Mughalzai (Italy) Gianluigi Malanga
65–70 kg	(India) Hitesh Gulia	(England) Odel Kamara	(France) Makan Traoré (United States) Carlos Flowers
70–75 kg	(Uzbekistan) Fazliddin Erkinboev	(Brazil) Kaue Belini	(Poland) Michał Jarliński (Italy) Remo Salvati
75–80 kg	(Uzbekistan) Javokhir Ummataliev	(Brazil) Wanderley Pereira	(Kazakhstan) Dias Molzhigitov (France) Yojerlin César
80–85 kg	(Kazakhstan) Daulet Tulemissov	(Uzbekistan) Akmaljon Isroilov	(France) Abdoulaye Traoré (Poland) Jakub Straszewski
85–90 kg	(Uzbekistan) Turabek Khabibullaev	(England) Isaac Okoh	(India) Vishal Bataan (Brazil) Isaías Ribeiro
+90 kg	(Uzbekistan) Jakhongir Zokirov	(England) Damar Thomas	(Kazakhstan) Daniyal Saparbay (United States) Kelvin Watts

=== Women ===
Event	Gold	Silver	Bronze
45–48 kg	(Argentina) Tatiana Flores	(Italy) Giovanna Marchese	(Chinese Taipei) Guo Yi-xuan (Brazil) Radija Silva
48–51 kg	(Kazakhstan) Zhazira Urakbayeva	(Italy) Lucia Elen Ayari	(Poland) Natalia Kuczewska (United States) Jennifer Lozano
51–54 kg	(Poland) Wiktoria Rogalińska	(United States) Yoseline Perez	(England) Lauren Mackie (Italy) Sirine Charaabi
54–57 kg	(Brazil) Jucielen Romeu	(Poland) Julia Szeremeta	(England) Vivien Parsons (Kazakhstan) Ulzhan Sarsenbek
57–60 kg	(Italy) Rebecca Nicoli	(Poland) Aneta Rygielska	(Australia) Tina Rahimi (England) Elise Glynn
60–65 kg	(England) Sacha Hickey	(Poland) Kinga Krowka	(United States) Morelle McCane (Chinese Taipei) Chen Nien-chin
65–70 kg	(Poland) Barbara Marcinkowska	(Australia) Lekeisha Pergoliti	(Germany) Leonie Mueller (Brazil) Queila Braga
70–75 kg	(Norway) Sunniva Hofstad	(Italy) Melissa Gemini	(Brazil) Viviane Pereira (Poland) Oliwia Toborek

== Stage II ==
=== Men ===
Event	Gold	Silver	Bronze
50 kg	(Kazakhstan) Sanzhar Tashkenbay	(Philippines) Jay Bryan Baricuatro	(Azerbaijan) Subhan Mamedov (Australia) Omer Izaz
55 kg	(Kazakhstan) Makhmud Sabyrkhan	(Japan) Rui Yamaguchi	(Bulgaria) Yasen Radev (Dominican Republic) Junior Alcántara
60 kg	(Brazil) Luiz Gabriel Oliveira	(Mongolia) Gantömöriin Lundaa	(Azerbaijan) Mahammadali Gasimzade (Japan) Shunsuke Kitamoto
65 kg	(Brazil) Yuri Falcão	(India) Abhinash Jamwal	(England) Patris Mughalzai (Kazakhstan) Yertugan Zeinullinov
70 kg	(Brazil) Kaian Reis	(India) Hitesh Gulia	(Mongolia) Otgonbaataryn Byamba-Erdene (France) Makan Traoré
75 kg	(Kazakhstan) Sabirzhan Akkalykov	(Bulgaria) Rami Kiwan	(India) Nikhil Dubey (Kyrgyzstan) Nuradin Rustambek Uulu
80 kg	(France) Yojerlin César	(Kazakhstan) Nurbek Oralbay	(United States) Robby Gonzales (Turkey) Mert Aybuğa
85 kg	(Kazakhstan) Bekzad Nurdauletov	(India) Jugnoo Ahlawat	(Turkey) Samet Ersoy (England) Teagn Stott
90 kg	(Brazil) Isaías Ribeiro	(Turkey) Emrah Yaşar	(France) Soheb Bouafia (Kazakhstan) Sagyndyk Togambay
+90 kg	(Kazakhstan) Aibek Oralbay	(Germany) Nikita Putilov	(India) Narender Berwal (Azerbaijan) Mahammad Abdullayev

=== Women ===
Event	Gold	Silver	Bronze
48 kg	(Kazakhstan) Nazym Kyzaibay	(France) Romane Moulai	(India) Minakshi Hooda (Turkey) Nurselen Yalgettekin
51 kg	(Finland) Pihla Kaivo-oja	(Kazakhstan) Alua Balkibekova	(France) Wassila Lkhadiri (Brazil) Caroline de Almeida
54 kg	(India) Sakshi Chaudhary	(United States) Yoseline Perez	(Uzbekistan) Feruza Kazakova (Poland) Wiktoria Rogalińska
57 kg	(India) Jaismine Lamboria	(Brazil) Jucielen Romeu	(Kazakhstan) Aidana Zabynbekova (Chinese Taipei) Wu Shih-yi
60 kg	(Kazakhstan) Viktoriya Grafeyeva	(Brazil) Rebeca Santos	(India) Sanju Khatri (England) Lucy Kings-Wheatley
65 kg	(Uzbekistan) Navbakhor Khamidova	(Turkey) Busenaz Sürmeneli	(United States) Morelle McCane (Kazakhstan) Aida Abikeyeva
70 kg	(Kazakhstan) Natalya Bogdanova	(Australia) Lekeisha Pergoliti	(Nigeria) Patricia Mbata (Germany) Leonie Müller
75 kg	(Norway) Sunniva Hofstad	(Kazakhstan) Nadezhda Ryabets	(Uzbekistan) Aziza Zokirova (Turkey) Büşra Işıldar
80 kg	(Australia) Eseta Flint	(India) Pooja Rani	(Uzbekistan) Sokhiba Ruzmetova (Turkey) Elif Güneri
+80 kg	(India) Nupur Sheoran	(Kazakhstan) Yeldana Talipova	(Turkey) Şeyma Düztaş (Uzbekistan) Oltinoy Sotimboeva

== Finals ==
=== Men ===
Event	Gold	Silver	Bronze
50 kg	(Uzbekistan) Asilbek Jalilov	(India) Jadumani Singh	
55 kg	(Uzbekistan) Samandar Olimov	(India) Pawan Bartwal	
60 kg	(India) Sachin Siwach	(Kyrgyzstan) Munarbek Seitbek Uulu	
65 kg	(Japan) Shion Nishiyama	(India) Abhinash Jamwal	
70 kg	(India) Hitesh Gulia	(Kazakhstan) Nurbek Mursal	
75 kg	(Uzbekistan) Javokhir Abdurakhimov	(Poland) Michal Jarlinski	(India) Sumit Kundu
80 kg	(England) Oladimeji Shittu	(India) Ankush Panghal	
85 kg	(Kazakhstan) Sultanbek Aibaruly	(Uzbekistan) Jasurbek Yuldoshev	(India) Jugnoo Ahlawat
90 kg	(England) Isaac Okoh	(Uzbekistan) Nusratbek Tokhirov	(India) Naveen Kumar
+90 kg	(Uzbekistan) Khalimjon Mamasoliev	(India) Narender Berwal	

=== Women ===
Event	Gold	Silver	Bronze
48 kg	(India) Minakshi Hooda	(Uzbekistan) Farzona Fozilova	(Ukraine) Hanna Okhota (South Korea) Bak Chorong
51 kg	(India) Nikhat Zareen	(Chinese Taipei) Xuan Yi Guo	
54 kg	(India) Preeti Pawar	(Italy) Sirine Charaabi	
57 kg	(India) Jaismine Lamboria	(Chinese Taipei) Wu Shih Yi	
60 kg	(India) Parveen Hooda	(Japan) Taguchi Ayaka	
65 kg	(Chinese Taipei) Chen Nien-Chin	(England) Dione Burman	(India) Neeraj Phogat
70 kg	(India) Arundhati Chaudhary	(Uzbekistan) Aziza Zokirova	
75 kg	(Australia) Emma-Sue Greentree	(Italy) Melissa Gemini	(India) Saweety Boora
80 kg	(Poland) Agata Kaczmarska	(India) Pooja Rani	
+80 kg	(India) Nupur Sheoran	(Uzbekistan) Oltinoy Sotimboeva	

== Participating nations ==
130+ boxers from 19 countries took part in the first leg held in Brazil. 400+ boxers from 31 countries participated in the second leg held in Kazakhstan. 130+ boxers from 18 nations took part in the final in India.

- Argentina
- Australia
- Austria
- Azerbaijan
- Brazil
- Bulgaria
- Canada
- Chinese Taipei
- Colombia
- Croatia
- Dominican Republic
- England
- Finland
- France
- Germany
- Guatemala
- India
- Iran
- Italy
- Japan
- Kazakhstan
- Kyrgyzstan
- Monaco
- Nigeria
- Norway
- Panama
- Philippines
- Poland
- Slovenia
- Spain
- South Korea
- Sweden
- Switzerland
- Turkey
- Ukraine
- United States
- Uzbekistan
- Wales
