= 2024 European U23 Boxing Championships =

International youth boxing competition

- Venue: Sofia Sports Hall
- Location: Sofia, Bulgaria
- Dates: 12 – 20 October 2024
- Competitors: 327 from 35 nations

The 2024 European U23 Men’s and Women’s Boxing Championships took place in Sofia, Bulgaria from 12 to 20 October 2024. Men and women boxers born between 2002 and 2005 was eligible for this championships. Only one boxer per national federation per weight category would be allowed to compete.

== Medals tables ==
* Host nation (Bulgaria)

Rank	Nation	Gold	Silver	Bronze	Total
1	Ukraine	8	3	3	14
2	Turkey	3	2	4	9
3	Ireland	3	1	4	8
4	England	2	3	4	9
5	Armenia	2	3	0	5
6	Serbia	2	1	4	7
7	France	2	0	2	4
8	Bulgaria*	1	1	1	3
8	Georgia	1	1	1	3
10	Moldova	1	0	1	2
11	Azerbaijan	0	3	1	4
12	Poland	0	1	4	5
13	IBA Neutral B	0	1	3	4
14	Romania	0	1	2	3
14	Scotland	0	1	2	3
16	Greece	0	1	1	2
16	Montenegro	0	1	1	2
18	Lithuania	0	1	0	1
19	Hungary	0	0	5	5
20	Latvia	0	0	2	2
21	Albania	0	0	1	1
21	Croatia	0	0	1	1
21	Estonia	0	0	1	1
21	Slovakia	0	0	1	1
21	Spain	0	0	1	1
Totals (25 entries)		25	25	50	100

== Schedule ==
Preliminary rounds
Quarterfinals
Semifinals
Final

Weight category	12 Oct	13 Oct	14 Oct	15 Oct	16 Oct	17 Oct	18 Oct	19 Oct	20 Oct	Total
Women
Minimumweight (48 kg)		2		4		2		1		9
Light Flyweight (50 kg)		4		4		2		1		11
Flyweight (52 kg)		2		4		2		1		9
Bantamweight (54 kg)	3			4		2		1		10
Featherweight (57 kg)		3		4		2		1		10
Lightweight (60 kg)	3			4		2		1		10
Light Welterweight (63 kg)		2		4		2		1		9
Welterweight (66 kg)				3		2		1		6
Light Middleweight (70 kg)		1		4		2		1		8
Middleweight (75 kg)				4		2		1		7
Light Heavyweight (81 kg)				1		2		1		4
Heavyweight (+81 kg)				1		2		1		4
Men
Minimumweight (48 kg)	2				4	2			1	9
Flyweight (51 kg)			4		4	2			1	11
Bantamweight (54 kg)			6		4	2			1	13
Featherweight (57 kg)	6	8			4	2			1	21
Lightweight (60 kg)	5	8			4	2			1	20
Light Welterweight (63.5 kg)	3		8		4	2			1	18
Welterweight (67 kg)	4	8			4	2			1	19
Light Middleweight (71 kg)	2		8		4	2			1	17
Middleweight (75 kg)	3	8			4	2			1	18
Light Heavyweight (80 kg)	7		8		4	2			1	22
Cruiserweight (86 kg)		2	8		4	2			1	17
Heavyweight (92 kg)	3				4	2			1	10
Super Heavyweight (+92 kg)			3		4	2			1	10
Total	41	48	45	41	52	50	–	12	13	302

== Medalists ==
Event	Gold	Silver	Bronze
Women
Minimumweight (48 kg)	Nurselen Yalgattekin (TUR)	Carleigh Irving (IRL)	Carmen González (ESP) Lilla Szeleczki (HUN)
Light Flyweight (50 kg)	Kristina Nađ Varga (SRB)	Natalia Kuczewska (POL)	Aleyna Demirkır (TUR) Marjona Savriyeva (AZE)
Flyweight (52 kg)	Daria-Olha Hutarina (UKR)	Gamze Soğuksu (TUR)	Nikola Prymaczenko (POL) Karmen Horvath (HUN)
Bantamweight (54 kg)	Sara Ćirković (SRB)	Lauren Mackie (ENG)	Robin Kelly (IRL) Cyndelle Bachelet (FRA)
Featherweight (57 kg)	Sthélyne Grosy (FRA)	Bojana Gojković (MNE)	Bibiana Lovašová (SVK) Maryna Muliarchyk (IBAB)
Lightweight (60 kg)	Elida Kocharyan (ARM)	Tetiana Dovgal (UKR)	Anna Sorokina (LAT) Sameenah Toussaint (ENG)
Light Welterweight (63 kg)	Sacha Hickey (ENG)	Kristina Kuluhova (SRB)	Esmanur Lök (TUR) Esmeralda Novruzaj (ALB)
Welterweight (66 kg)	Nataliia Merinova (UKR)	Loredana Marin (ROU)	Dione Burman (ENG) Kitija Zārberga (LAT)
Light Middleweight (70 kg)	Lisa O'Rourke (IRL)	Darya Letsko (IBAB)	Barbara Marcinkowska (POL) Caitlin Rainey (SCO)
Middleweight (75 kg)	Büşra Işıldar (TUR)	Raisa Piskun (UKR)	Oliwia Toborek (POL) Vasiliki Stavridou (GRE)
Light Heavyweight (81 kg)	Iryna Lutsak (UKR)	Tatia Bukia (GEO)	Maria Cimpoeru (ROU) Veronika Nakota (HUN)
Heavyweight (+81 kg)	Daria Kozorez (MDA)	Şeyma Düztaş (TUR)	Réka Hoffmann (HUN) Polina Chernenko (UKR)
Men
Minimumweight (48 kg)	Louis Rooney (IRL)	Tural Sariyev (AZE)	Csaba Zsigó (HUN) Salih Samet Oruç (TUR)
Flyweight (51 kg)	Rudolf Garboyan (ARM)	Nijat Huseynov (AZE)	Clepson Dos Santos (IRL) Omer Ametović (SRB)
Bantamweight (54 kg)	Patsy Joyce (IRL)	Aaron Cullen (SCO)	Dmytro Kolisnichenko (UKR) Christopher Hippocrate (FRA)
Featherweight (57 kg)	Gor Ayvazyan (GEO)	Ruslan Aslikyan (ARM)	Leonardo Wood (ENG) Mehmethan Çınar (TUR)
Lightweight (60 kg)	Radoslav Rosenov (BUL)	Artur Sahakyan (ARM)	Tomislav Đinović (MNE) Jack Dryden (ENG)
Light Welterweight (63.5 kg)	Danyil Zamorylo (UKR)	Patris Mughalzai (ENG)	Vadzim Vauchok (IBAB) Nazif Sejdi (SRB)
Welterweight (67 kg)	Danylo Lozan (UKR)	Harutyun Hakobkokhyan (ARM)	Vladislav Gudzi (MDA) Rumen Rumenov (BUL)
Light Middleweight (71 kg)	Yurii Zakharieiev (UKR)	Aleksandr Trofimcuk (LTU)	Bobbi Flood (IRL) Cezary Znamiec (POL)
Middleweight (75 kg)	Dzhamal Kuliiev (UKR)	William Cholov (BUL)	Alan Perrie (SCO) Almir Memić (SRB)
Light Heavyweight (80 kg)	Yojerlin César (FRA)	Murad Allahverdiyev (AZE)	Antonio Grabić (CRO) Ahmed Mavrić (SRB)
Cruiserweight (86 kg)	Teagn Stott (ENG)	Ashot Kocharian (UKR)	Giorgi Gutsaev (GEO) Виноградов, Антон (EST)
Heavyweight (92 kg)	Emrah Yaşar (TUR)	Isaac Okoh (ENG)	Volodymyr Kushnir (UKR) Denis Matsuliov (IBAB)
Super Heavyweight (+92 kg)	Vasyl Tkachuk (UKR)	Stylianos Roulias (GRE)	Florin Ioniță (ROU) Martin McDonagh (IRL)

== Participating countries ==
- Albania (4)
- Armenia (17)
- Austria (3)
- Azerbaijan (13)
- Belgium (3)
- Bosnia and Herzegovina (2)
- Bulgaria (11)
- Croatia (9)
- Czech Republic (1)
- England (18)
- Estonia (2)
- France (9)
- Georgia (12)
- Greece (9)
- Hungary (19)
- IBA Neutral B (15)
- IBA Neutral N (2)
- Ireland (18)
- Israel (8)
- Kosovo (4)
- Latvia (4)
- Lithuania (5)
- Moldova (11)
- Montenegro (3)
- North Macedonia (6)
- Poland (15)
- Romania (11)
- Scotland (7)
- Serbia (15)
- Slovakia (7)
- Slovenia (1)
- Spain (11)
- Turkey (25)
- Ukraine (25)
- Wales (3)

== Draw sheets ==
=== Women's Minimumweight (48 kg) ===
First round
Amalia Foteinatou (GRE)	0
Lusine Gevorgyan (ARM)	5
Carmen González (ESP)	5
Wioletta Ptak (POL)	0

Quarterfinals
Carleigh Irving (IRL)	5
Mehpara Mammadova (AZE)	0
Lilla Szeleczki (HUN)	4
Rahiba Ismailovi (GEO)	1
Sofiia Turbinina (UKR)	1
Nurselen Yalgattekin (TUR)	4
Lusine Gevorgyan (ARM)	2
Carmen González (ESP)	3

Semifinals
Carleigh Irving (IRL)	5
Lilla Szeleczki (HUN)	0
Nurselen Yalgattekin (TUR)	5
Carmen González (ESP)	0

Final
Carleigh Irving (IRL)	2
Nurselen Yalgattekin (TUR)	3

=== Women's Light Flyweight (50 kg) ===
First round
Iryna Vinahradava (IBAB)	0
Mihaela Badescu (ROU)	5
Petra Mezei (HUN)	0
Kristina Nađ Varga (SRB)	5
Mayssoun Bourega (FRA)	5
Laura Barceló (ESP)	0
Aleyna Demirkır (TUR)	4
Kelsey Oakley (ENG)	0

Quarterfinals
Natalia Kuczewska (POL)	5
Inna Suprunenko (UKR)	0
Brooke Neely (SCO)	0
Marjona Savriyeva (AZE)	5
Mihaela Badescu (ROU)	0
Kristina Nađ Varga (SRB)	5
Mayssoun Bourega (FRA)	0
Aleyna Demirkır (TUR)	5

Semifinals
Natalia Kuczewska (POL)	4
Marjona Savriyeva (AZE)	1
Kristina Nađ Varga (SRB)	5
Aleyna Demirkır (TUR)	0

Final
Natalia Kuczewska (POL)
Kristina Nađ Varga (SRB)	RSC-I

=== Women's Flyweight (52 kg) ===
First round
Yeseniya Bankevich (IBAB)	0
Daria-Olha Hutarina (UKR)	5
Kaëlya Mopin (FRA)	0
Dragana Jovanović (SRB)	4

Quarterfinals
Tala Khabbas (BUL)	0
Karmen Horvath (HUN)	5
Iratxe Vals (ESP)	0
Gamze Soğuksu (TUR)	5
Arevik Dokholyan (ARM)	0
Nikola Prymaczenko (POL)	5
Daria-Olha Hutarina (UKR)	5
Dragana Jovanović (SRB)	0

Semifinals
Karmen Horvath (HUN)	0
Gamze Soğuksu (TUR)	5
Nikola Prymaczenko (POL)	0
Daria-Olha Hutarina (UKR)	5

Final
Gamze Soğuksu (TUR)	1
Daria-Olha Hutarina (UKR)	4

=== Women's Bantamweight (54 kg) ===
First round
Lauren Mackie (ENG)	5
Laura Horvath (HUN)	0
Viktoriia Shkeul (UKR)	1
Zoe Andrews (WAL)	4
Cyndelle Bachelet (FRA)	5
Zeynab Rahimova (AZE)	0

Quarterfinals
Sara Ćirković (SRB)	5
Anna Zurnachyan (ARM)	0
Robin Kelly (IRL)	4
Tatsiana Trushkina (IBAB)	1
Nilay Yaren Çam (TUR)	1
Lauren Mackie (ENG)	4
Zoe Andrews (WAL)	2
Cyndelle Bachelet (FRA)	3

Semifinals
Sara Ćirković (SRB)	5
Robin Kelly (IRL)	0
Lauren Mackie (ENG)	5
Cyndelle Bachelet (FRA)	0

Final
Sara Ćirković (SRB)	5
Lauren Mackie (ENG)	0

=== Women's Featherweight (57 kg) ===
First round
Olivia Holmes (ENG)	0
Bojana Gojković (MNE)	4
Khuraman Kasumova (GEO)	5
Anhelina Lakhno (UKR)	0
Julya Lalayan (ARM)	0
Maryna Muliarchyk (IBAB)	5

Quarterfinals
Sthélyne Grosy (FRA)	4
Niamh Fay (IRL)	`
Bibiana Lovašová (SVK)	3
Ece Asude Ediz (TUR)	2
Rebeka Dobos (HUN)	0
Bojana Gojković (MNE)	5
Khuraman Kasumova (GEO)	0
Maryna Muliarchyk (IBAB)	5

Semifinals
Sthélyne Grosy (FRA)	5
Bibiana Lovašová (SVK)	0
Bojana Gojković (MNE)	5
Maryna Muliarchyk (IBAB)	0

Final
Sthélyne Grosy (FRA)	3
Bojana Gojković (MNE)	2

=== Women's Lightweight (60 kg) ===
First round
Lana Bolkvadze (GEO)	RSC
Daliya Raycheva (BUL)
Zoé Harcos (HUN)	0
María Horche (ESP)	5
Anna Sorokina (LAT)	5
Yana Novoshinskaya (IBAB)	0

Quarterfinals
Evin Erginoğuz (TUR)	0
Sameenah Toussaint (ENG)	5
Tetiana Dovgal (UKR)	5
Beata Galdikaitė (LTU)	0
Elida Kocharyan (ARM)	5
Lana Bolkvadze (GEO)	0
María Horche (ESP)	0
Anna Sorokina (LAT)	5

Semifinals
Sameenah Toussaint (ENG)	0
Tetiana Dovgal (UKR)	5
Elida Kocharyan (ARM)	5
Anna Sorokina (LAT)	0

Final
Tetiana Dovgal (UKR)	2
Elida Kocharyan (ARM)	3

=== Women's Light Welterweight (63 kg) ===
First round
Esmanur Lök (TUR)	4
Linda Desmond (IRL)	1
Anastazja Michałek (POL)	0
Megan de Cler (IBAN)	5

Quarterfinals
Sona Harutyunyan (ARM)	1
Esmeralda Novruzaj (ALB)	4
Jekaterina Sorokina (LAT)	0
Kristina Kuluhova (SRB)	5
Sacha Hickey (ENG)	5
Yuliia Filipova (UKR)	0
Esmanur Lök (TUR)	5
Megan de Cler (IBAN)	0

Semifinals
Esmeralda Novruzaj (ALB)	0
Kristina Kuluhova (SRB)	5
Sacha Hickey (ENG)	5
Esmanur Lök (TUR)	0

Final
Kristina Kuluhova (SRB)	0
Sacha Hickey (ENG)	5

=== Women's Welterweight (66 kg) ===
Quarterfinals
Kitija Zārberga (LAT)	5
Kaci Rock (IRL)	0
Nataliia Merinova (UKR)	4
Berfin Kabak (TUR)	1
Dione Burman (ENG)
Valeria Andreeva (BUL)

Semifinals
Loredana Marin (ROU)	4
Kitija Zārberga (LAT)	1
Nataliia Merinova (UKR)	4
Dione Burman (ENG)	0

Final
Loredana Marin (ROU)	1
Nataliia Merinova (UKR)	4

=== Women's Light Middleweight (70 kg) ===
First round
Crinuța Sebe (ROU)	0
Barbara Marcinkowska (POL)	5

Quarterfinals
Darya Letsko (IBAB)	5
Nikolett Kovács (HUN)	0
Caitlin Rainey (SCO)	4
Yaren Düztaş (TUR)	1
Anastasija Lukajić (SRB)
Lisa O'Rourke (IRL)	RSC
Anastasiia Saraniuk (UKR)
Barbara Marcinkowska (POL)	RSC

Semifinals
Darya Letsko (IBAB)	5
Caitlin Rainey (SCO)	0
Lisa O'Rourke (IRL)	5
Barbara Marcinkowska (POL)	0

Final
Darya Letsko (IBAB)	0
Lisa O'Rourke (IRL)	5

=== Women's Middleweight (75 kg) ===
Quarterfinals		Semifinals		Final
Vasiliki Stavridou (GRE)	4
Bethany Doocey (IRL)	1	Vasiliki Stavridou (GRE)	0
Maryia Pilipenka (IBAB)	0	Raisa Piskun (UKR)	5
Raisa Piskun (UKR)	5			Raisa Piskun (UKR)	0
Mary-Kate Smith (ENG)	0			Büşra Işıldar (TUR)	5
Büşra Işıldar (TUR)	5	Büşra Işıldar (TUR)	5
Oliwia Toborek (POL)	RSC	Oliwia Toborek (POL)	0
Nóra Komjáthi (HUN)

=== Women's Light Heavyweight (81 kg) ===
Quarterfinals
Veronika Nakota (HUN)	4
Sıla Üçyıldız (TUR)	1

Semifinals
Iryna Lutsak (UKR)	RSC
Maria Cimpoeru (ROU)
Tatia Bukia (GEO)	WO
Veronika Nakota (HUN)

Final
Iryna Lutsak (UKR)	5
Tatia Bukia (GEO)	0

=== Women's Heavyweight (+81 kg) ===
Quarterfinals
Polina Chernenko (UKR)	RSC
Maria Botica (ROU)

Semifinals
Réka Hoffmann (HUN)	0
Daria Kozorez (MDA)	5
Şeyma Düztaş (TUR)	RSC
Polina Chernenko (UKR)

Final
Daria Kozorez (MDA)	5
Şeyma Düztaş (TUR)	0

=== Men's Minimumweight (48 kg) ===
First round
Mihai Porombac (MDA)	0
Csaba Zsigó (HUN)	5
Carlos Díaz (ESP)	5
Roman Teliavskyi (UKR)	0

Quarterfinals
Salih Samet Oruç (TUR)	5
Ilan Lazarev (ISR)	0
Lasha Kereselidze (GEO)	0
Tural Sariyev (AZE)	5
Louis Rooney (IRL)	4
Hovhannes Harutyunyan (ARM)	1
Csaba Zsigó (HUN)	4
Carlos Díaz (ESP)	1

Semifinals
Salih Samet Oruç (TUR)	1
Tural Sariyev (AZE)	4
Louis Rooney (IRL)	5
Csaba Zsigó (HUN)	0

Final
Tural Sariyev (AZE)	1
Louis Rooney (IRL)	4

=== Men's Flyweight (51 kg) ===
First round
Reece Readshaw (ENG)	1
Cătălin Turcu (MDA)	4
Omer Ametović (SRB)	4
Maksym Rudyk (UKR)	1
Nurullah Oyan (TUR)	0
Rafael Lozano (ESP)	5
Nijat Huseynov (AZE)	5
Scott Richards (WAL)	0

Quarterfinals
Davit Japaridze (GEO)	0
Clepson Dos Santos (IRL)	5
Rudolf Garboyan (ARM)	5
Nikee Cummings (FRA)	0
Cătălin Turcu (MDA)	1
Omer Ametović (SRB)	4
Rafael Lozano (ESP)	0
Nijat Huseynov (AZE)	5

Semifinals
Clepson Dos Santos (IRL)	0
Rudolf Garboyan (ARM)	5
Omer Ametović (SRB)	0
Nijat Huseynov (AZE)	5

Final
Rudolf Garboyan (ARM)	4
Nijat Huseynov (AZE)	1

=== Men's Bantamweight (54 kg) ===
First round
Ellis Trowbridge (ENG)	5
Tibor Katona (SVK)	0
Dmytro Kolisnichenko (UKR)	5
Adalbert Pater (ROU)	0
Farid Hreish (ISR)	0
Juan Pantoja (ESP)	5
Aaron Cullen (SCO)	5
Nikolas Pawlik (POL)	0
Can Kaya (TUR)	0
Davit Yegoryan (ARM)	5
Christopher Hippocrate (FRA)	5
Amin Mammadzada (AZE)	0

Quarterfinals
Patsy Joyce (IRL)	5
Allan Morozov (EST)	0
Ellis Trowbridge (ENG)	0
Dmytro Kolisnichenko (UKR)	5
Juan Pantoja (ESP)	0
Aaron Cullen (SCO)	5
Davit Yegoryan (ARM)	0
Christopher Hippocrate (FRA)	5

Semifinals
Patsy Joyce (IRL)	5
Dmytro Kolisnichenko (UKR)	0
Aaron Cullen (SCO)	5
Christopher Hippocrate (FRA)	0

Final
Patsy Joyce (IRL)	4
Aaron Cullen (SCO)	1

=== Men's Featherweight (57 kg) ===
First round
Lukáš Vymyslický (SVK)	0
Ilie Argatu (MDA)	5
Raúl Escudero (ESP)	5
Luar Aliu (KOS)	0
Nikolay Marinov (BUL)	0
Gor Ayvazyan (GEO)	5
Denys Rozdolskyi (UKR)	5
Vide Prkačin (CRO)	0
Vitas Hartsuyeu (IBAB)
Alen Rustemovski (MKD)	RSC
Gavin Ryan (IRL)	5
Eusebiu Tîrzoman (ROU)	0

Second round
Jakub Krzpiet (POL)	0
Mehmethan Çınar (TUR)	5
Vasileios Stratakos (GRE)	0
Ariol Zeneli (ALB)	5
Ryan Bieou (FRA)	5
Kamil Babayev (AZE)	0
Ruslan Aslikyan (ARM)	5
Valentin Koloszár (HUN)	0
Leonardo Wood (ENG)	5
Luka Mihajlović (SRB)	0
Ilie Argatu (MDA)	5
Raúl Escudero (ESP)	0
Gor Ayvazyan (GEO)	5
Denys Rozdolskyi (UKR)	0
Alen Rustemovski (MKD)	0
Gavin Ryan (IRL)	5

Quarterfinals
Mehmethan Çınar (TUR)	5
Ariol Zeneli (ALB)	0
Ryan Bieou (FRA)	0
Ruslan Aslikyan (ARM)	5
Leonardo Wood (ENG)	5
Ilie Argatu (MDA)	0
Gor Ayvazyan (GEO)	5
Gavin Ryan (IRL)	0

Semifinals
Mehmethan Çınar (TUR)	1
Ruslan Aslikyan (ARM)	4
Leonardo Wood (ENG)	0
Gor Ayvazyan (GEO)	5

Final
Ruslan Aslikyan (ARM)	1
Gor Ayvazyan (GEO)	4

=== Men's Lightweight (60 kg) ===
First round
Kaseem Darawsha (ISR)	0
Selahattin Cinibulak (TUR)	5
Owain Harris-Allan (WAL)	5
Victor Catalino (ESP)	0
Radoslav Rosenov (BUL)	5
Kruzító Kovács (HUN)	0
Ruslan Gadirov (AZE)	5
Georgios Georgantzas (GRE)	0
Matej Zebić (CRO)	0
Stefan Camović (SRB)	5

Second round
Isa Akram (SCO)	3
Matvejs Prokudins (LAT)	2
Ruzhdi Rustemovski (MKD)
Jack Dryden (ENG)	RSC
Saba Eremeishvili (GEO)	1
Maksym Vlasiuk (UKR)	3
Artur Sahakyan (ARM)	5
Iuli Bârsănescu (ROU)	0
Uladzislau Smalouski (IBAB)	2
Tomislav Đinović (MNE)	3
Vladyslav Vaskovskyi (MDA)	3
Selahattin Cinibulak (TUR)	2
Owain Harris-Allan (WAL)	0
Radoslav Rosenov (BUL)	5
Ruslan Gadirov (AZE)	5
Stefan Camović (SRB)	0

Quarterfinals
Isa Akram (SCO)	0
Jack Dryden (ENG)	5
Maksym Vlasiuk (UKR)	0
Artur Sahakyan (ARM)	5
Tomislav Đinović (MNE)	5
Vladyslav Vaskovskyi (MDA)	0
Radoslav Rosenov (BUL)	5
Ruslan Gadirov (AZE)	0

Semifinals
Jack Dryden (ENG)	2
Artur Sahakyan (ARM)	3
Tomislav Đinović (MNE)	0
Radoslav Rosenov (BUL)	5

Final
Artur Sahakyan (ARM)	0
Radoslav Rosenov (BUL)	5

=== Men's Light Welterweight (63.5 kg) ===
First round
Ștefan Vozneacovschi (MDA)	5
Stelios Kirsanidis (GRE)	0
Patris Mughalzai (ENG)	RSC
Einoras Sinkevičius (LTU)
Dion Lena (MKD)	0
Lasha Gagnidze (GEO)	5

Second round
Abdul-Fawaz Aborode (SCO)	0
Vadzim Vauchok (IBAB)	5
Juraj Bóna (SVK)	1
Roy Farrelly (IRL)	4
Bartłomiej Rośkowicz (POL)	2
Levente Oláh (HUN)	3
Krasimir Dzhurov (BUL)	0
Danyil Zamorylo (UKR)	5
Yehor Novikov (ISR)	0
Ahmet Pekel (TUR)	5
Manvel Petrosyan (ARM)	0
Nazif Sejdi (SRB)	5
Ivan Božac (CRO)	1
Ștefan Vozneacovschi (MDA)	4
Patris Mughalzai (ENG)	5
Lasha Gagnidze (GEO)	0

Quarterfinals
Vadzim Vauchok (IBAB)	4
Roy Farrelly (IRL)	0
Levente Oláh (HUN)	0
Danyil Zamorylo (UKR)	5
Ahmet Pekel (TUR)	1
Nazif Sejdi (SRB)	4
Ștefan Vozneacovschi (MDA)	0
Patris Mughalzai (ENG)	5

Semifinals
Vadzim Vauchok (IBAB)	1
Danyil Zamorylo (UKR)	4
Nazif Sejdi (SRB)	1
Patris Mughalzai (ENG)	4

Final
Danyil Zamorylo (UKR)	4
Patris Mughalzai (ENG)	1

=== Men's Welterweight (67 kg) ===
First round
Goran Miočić (CRO)	0
Ilgar Salakhov (AZE)	5
Adolf Staněk (SVK)	2
Safi Abo Shaaban (ISR)	3
Loris Idrizi (KOS)	4
Ellis Panter (ENG)	1
Harutyun Hakobkokhyan (ARM)	5
Panagiotis Kostouros (GRE)	0

Second round
Daniil Tsitko (IBAB)	0
Gökdeniz Yağar (TUR)	5
Givi Todua (GEO)	2
Vladislav Gudzi (MDA)	3
Nedas Gudomskas (LTU)	5
Nana Alfred (AUT)	0
Paweł Sulęcki (POL)	1
Danylo Lozan (UKR)	4
Filip Džida (SRB)	4
Rafael Buza (HUN)	1
Rumen Rumenov (BUL)	3
Luke Hall (IRL)	2
Ilgar Salakhov (AZE)	2
Safi Abo Shaaban (ISR)	3
Loris Idrizi (KOS)	2
Harutyun Hakobkokhyan (ARM)	3

Quarterfinals
Gökdeniz Yağar (TUR)	1
Vladislav Gudzi (MDA)	4
Nedas Gudomskas (LTU)	0
Danylo Lozan (UKR)	5
Filip Džida (SRB)	0
Rumen Rumenov (BUL)	5
Safi Abo Shaaban (ISR)	0
Harutyun Hakobkokhyan (ARM)	5

Semifinals
Vladislav Gudzi (MDA)	0
Danylo Lozan (UKR)	5
Rumen Rumenov (BUL)	2
Harutyun Hakobkokhyan (ARM)	3

Final
Danylo Lozan (UKR)	4
Harutyun Hakobkokhyan (ARM)	1

=== Men's Light Middleweight (71 kg) ===
First round
Mohammad Issa (ISR)	5
Dimitrije Andrejević (SRB)	0
Cem Kaya (TUR)	0
Bobbi Flood (IRL)	5

Second round
Kenge Oniemba (BEL)	1
Giorgi Zhorzholiani (GEO)	4
Dominik Énekes (HUN)	1
Cezary Znamiec (POL)	3
Narek Zakharyan (ARM)	5
Ladislav Horváth (SVK)	0
Patrick Hewitt (ENG)	2
Aleksandr Trofimcuk (LTU)	3
Yurii Zakharieiev (UKR)	5
Vasile Cebotari (MDA)	0
Enis Aliu (MKD)	0
Blagovest Nedelchev (BUL)	5
Shamsi Shahbazov (AZE)
Sergio Martínez (ESP)	RSC
Mohammad Issa (ISR)	0
Bobbi Flood (IRL)	5

Quarterfinals
Giorgi Zhorzholiani (GEO)	0
Cezary Znamiec (POL)	5
Narek Zakharyan (ARM)	0
Aleksandr Trofimcuk (LTU)	5
Yurii Zakharieiev (UKR)	5
Blagovest Nedelchev (BUL)	0
Sergio Martínez (ESP)	0
Bobbi Flood (IRL)	5

Semifinals
Cezary Znamiec (POL)	0
Aleksandr Trofimcuk (LTU)	4
Yurii Zakharieiev (UKR)	4
Bobbi Flood (IRL)	1

Final
Aleksandr Trofimcuk (LTU)	0
Yurii Zakharieiev (UKR)	5

=== Men's Middleweight (75 kg) ===
First round
Nikolaos Andrikopoulos (GRE)	0
Mateusz Urban (POL)	5
Marian-Alexandru Buleu (ROU)	3
Arvydas Dainys (LTU)	2
Levente Gémes (HUN)	5
Gabrijel Debanić (CRO)	0

Second round
Vladimir Nazimco (MDA)	2
Bohdan Lopatin (ISR)	3
Joshua Olaniyan (IRL)	0
Dzhamal Kuliiev (UKR)	5
Alan Perrie (SCO)	4
Sultan Osmanlı (TUR)	1
Chadi Baraia (FRA)	1
Farhad Sheydayev (AZE)	4
Roman Horváth (SVK)	1
Grega Rainer (SLO)	4
William Cholov (BUL)	5
Garik Antanosyan (ARM)	0
Almir Memić (SRB)	5
Mateusz Urban (POL)	0
Marian-Alexandru Buleu (ROU)	0
Levente Gémes (HUN)	5

Quarterfinals
Bohdan Lopatin (ISR)
Dzhamal Kuliiev (UKR)	RSC
Alan Perrie (SCO)	3
Farhad Sheydayev (AZE)	2
Grega Rainer (SLO)	0
William Cholov (BUL)	5
Almir Memić (SRB)	4
Levente Gémes (HUN)	1

Semifinals
Dzhamal Kuliiev (UKR)	5
Alan Perrie (SCO)	0
William Cholov (BUL)	5
Almir Memić (SRB)	0

Final
Dzhamal Kuliiev (UKR)	4
William Cholov (BUL)	1

=== Men's Light Heavyweight (80 kg) ===
First round
Yojerlin César (FRA)	5
Josh Mullen (SCO)	0
Hamlet Adamyan (ARM)	5
Oussama El-Moussaoui (BEL)	0
Daniel Florian (CZE)	0
Valeriu Razmerita (MDA)	5
James Whelan (IRL)	5
Barış Can Polat (TUR)	0
Antonio Grabić (CRO)	5
Lucky Osaro Aimufua (AUT)	0
Miroslav Dimitrov (BUL)	5
Sebastian Kusz (POL)	0
Arjan Iseni (MKD)	2
Daniel Ilyushonok (ISR)	3

Second round
Redis Karaj (ALB)	0
Matvii Razhba (UKR)	5
Murad Allahverdiyev (AZE)	3
Aliaksei Koktsikau (IBAB)	2
Márkó Simon (HUN)	4
Oladimeji Shittu (ENG)	1
Eldar Hodžić (BIH)	0
Ahmed Mavrić (SRB)	5
Michail Tsamalidis (GRE)	0
Yojerlin César (FRA)	5
Hamlet Adamyan (ARM)	2
Valeriu Razmerita (MDA)	3
James Whelan (IRL)	0
Antonio Grabić (CRO)	5
Miroslav Dimitrov (BUL)	1
Daniel Ilyushonok (ISR)	4

Quarterfinals
Matvii Razhba (UKR)	2
Murad Allahverdiyev (AZE)	3
Márkó Simon (HUN)	1
Ahmed Mavrić (SRB)	4
Yojerlin César (FRA)	5
Valeriu Razmerita (MDA)	0
Antonio Grabić (CRO)	5
Daniel Ilyushonok (ISR)	0

Semifinals
Murad Allahverdiyev (AZE)	5
Ahmed Mavrić (SRB)	0
Yojerlin César (FRA)	5
Antonio Grabić (CRO)	0

Final
Murad Allahverdiyev (AZE)	0
Yojerlin César (FRA)	5

=== Men's Cruiserweight (86 kg) ===
First round
Taulant Jakupi (KOS)	RSC
Robert McNulty (SCO)
Marko Pižurica (SRB)	5
Jakub Straszewski (POL)	0

Second round
Anton Vinogradov (EST)	5
Mohamed Amine Mrabet (BEL)	0
Petar Liješević (MNE)	2
Andrei Masalau (IBAB)	3
Michael Derouiche (AUT)	0
Rubén Ibáñez (ESP)	5
Bedirhan Kalkan (TUR)	2
Ashot Kocharian (UKR)	3
Seyid Seyidov (AZE)	1
Teagn Stott (ENG)	4
Patrick Plantić (CRO)	0
Mikita Gorbatenko (BUL)	5
Kian Hedderman (IRL)	0
Giorgi Gutsaev (GEO)	5
Taulant Jakupi (KOS)	0
Marko Pižurica (SRB)	5

Quarterfinals
Anton Vinogradov (EST)	5
Andrei Masalau (IBAB)	0
Rubén Ibáñez (ESP)	0
Ashot Kocharian (UKR)	5
Teagn Stott (ENG)	3
Mikita Gorbatenko (BUL)	2
Giorgi Gutsaev (GEO)	5
Marko Pižurica (SRB)	0

Semifinals
Anton Vinogradov (EST)	2
Ashot Kocharian (UKR)	3
Teagn Stott (ENG)	5
Giorgi Gutsaev (GEO)	0

Final
Ashot Kocharian (UKR)	0
Teagn Stott (ENG)	5

=== Men's Heavyweight (92 kg) ===
First round
Emrah Yaşar (TUR)	KO
Lazar Lazarević (SRB)
Volodymyr Kushnir (UKR)	RSC
Jan Morović (CRO)
Henrik Tshghrikyan (ARM)	5
Donat Syla (KOS)	0

Quarterfinals
Patryk Borucki (POL)	0
Denis Matsuliov (IBAB)	5
Luis Gjolena (ALB)	0
Isaac Okoh (ENG)	5
Levente Kiss (HUN)	0
Emrah Yaşar (TUR)	5
Volodymyr Kushnir (UKR)	RSC
Henrik Tshghrikyan (ARM)

Semifinals
Denis Matsuliov (IBAB)	0
Isaac Okoh (ENG)	5
Emrah Yaşar (TUR)	5
Volodymyr Kushnir (UKR)	0

Final
Isaac Okoh (ENG)	0
Emrah Yaşar (TUR)	5

=== Men's Super Heavyweight (+92 kg) ===
First round
Lovro Pavčec (CRO)	0
Vasyl Tkachuk (UKR)	5
Müslüm Çinibulak (TUR)	0
Nicolai Burdiuja (MDA)	5
Damar Thomas (ENG)	2
Florin Ioniță (ROU)	3

Quarterfinals
Martin McDonagh (IRL)	4
Mikita Nahorny (IBAB)	1
Stylianos Roulias (GRE)	RSC
Alija Mešić (BIH)
Ardijan Azemi (MKD)
Vasyl Tkachuk (UKR)	RSC
Nicolai Burdiuja (MDA)	1
Florin Ioniță (ROU)	4

Semifinals
Martin McDonagh (IRL)	2
Stylianos Roulias (GRE)	3
Vasyl Tkachuk (UKR)	3
Florin Ioniță (ROU)	2

Final
Stylianos Roulias (GRE)	2
Vasyl Tkachuk (UKR)	3
