= Yeldana Talipova =

Kazakhstani boxer (born 2002)

Personal information
- Nationality: Kazakhstani
- Born: 30 March 2002 (age 24) Almaty, Kazakhstan

Boxing career
- Weight class: Heavyweight (+81 kg)
Medal record
Women's amateur boxing
Representing Kazakhstan
World Championships
Bronze medal – third place	2025 Liverpool	+80 kg
IBA World Championships
Silver medal – second place	2025 Niš	Heavyweight
World Junior Championships
Bronze medal – third place	2021 Kielce	Heavyweight
Asian Championships
Gold medal – first place	2024 Chiang Mai	Heavyweight

Yeldana Talipova (born 30 March 2002) is a Kazakhstani boxer who competes in the heavyweight (+80 kg) division. She is a medalist at the Asian Boxing Championships, IBA World Championships and World Boxing Championships.

== Amateur career ==
Talipova began boxing at the age of 11.

In April 2021, at the Youth World Championships, Talipova won a bronze medal in the heavyweight division. In 2024, she won the gold medal at the Asian Championships in Chiang Mai, Thailand, defeating Uzbek boxer Altynai Sotimboyeva in the final.

Talipova competed in the heavyweight division at the 2025 IBA Women's World Boxing Championships in Niš, Serbia and won the silver medal. She won the silver medal at the second stage of the 2025 World Boxing Cup. In September of that year, Talipova competed in the World Boxing Championships in Liverpool, England in the women's +80 kg category. In her opening bout, she defeated Celine Lee-Lo in the quarterfinals. She then lost in the semifinals to Polish boxer Agata Kaczmarska, winning a bronze medal.
