= Pooja Rani =

Indian boxer (born 1991)

Personal information
- Full name: Pooja Rani Bohra
- Born: 17 February 1991 (age 35) Nimriwali, Haryana, India
- Height: 1.69 m (5 ft 7 in)

Sport
- Sport: Boxing
Medal record
Women's amateur boxing
Representing India
World Championships
Bronze medal – third place	2025 Liverpool	80kg
World Cup
Silver medal – second place	2025 Astana	80kg
Silver medal – second place	2025 New Delhi	80kg
Asian Games
Bronze medal – third place	2014 Incheon	75kg
Asian Championships
Gold medal – first place	2019 Bangkok	81kg
Gold medal – first place	2021 Dubai	75kg
Silver medal – second place	2012 Ulaanbaatar	75kg
Bronze medal – third place	2015 Wulanchabu	75kg
Asian Elite Championships
Bronze medal – third place	2026 Ulaanbaatar	80 kg
South Asian Games
Gold medal – first place	2016 Guwahati	75kg

Pooja Rani Bohra (born 17 February 1991) is an Indian boxer. She is a two time Asian Champion and has won a bronze medal at the 2014 Asian Games in the 75 kg event. She has represented India in the 75 kg event at the 2020 Tokyo Olympics, where she reached the quarterfinals and finished fifth.

== Early life ==
Pooja Rani Bohra hails from Nimriwali village of Haryana state's Bhiwani district, considered to be the sport's cradle in India. It took her a year to find the courage to join the Hawa Singh Boxing Academy in her town, and kept it secret from her father, whom she knew would disapprove, when she did. She would hide her injuries from the sport so that her father would not find out, staying over at friend's houses while her wounds subsided.

Pooja had to fight against her father's dislike of the sport to be allowed to compete professionally for almost six months. In an interview, she mentions how her father would tell her that 'good children did not play boxing'. When her father found out about her boxing ambitions, he banned her from attending classes. Her coach Sanjay Kumar Sheoran had to plead with her family to allow her to compete. Even so, it took nearly six months to convince her parents to allow her to box professionally.

Her first major win came in 2009 defeating a leading Haryana boxer Preeti Beniwal in the state championships, she became a youth state champion and followed it up with a silver in the Youth Nationals in the 60 kg category. Her family start supporting her and her father rewarded her with a bike.

In Diwali 2017, she burnt her hand, which kept her out for six months. Eager to make up for lost time, she hurried into training and sustained a shoulder injury. Her confidence dented, Rani felt it was better to switch to the 81 kg category. In April 2019, she won the ASBC Asian Championship gold by defeating China's Wang Lina.

Pooja also serves as an Income Tax inspector at the Haryana government.

== Boxing career ==
Pooja won the National Youth Boxing Championship in 2009, after which she broke through to the national stage. She then won the silver medal at the Asian Boxing Championships 2012 and the Arafura Games held in Australia in 2012, making her one of the top contenders to qualify for the 2016 Olympics at Rio. However, she lost at the second round of the AIBA Women's World Boxing Championships in 2016 and thus failed to qualify for the Rio Olympics.

She also had the opportunity to represent India in the 2014 Commonwealth Games, but lost to famous English boxer Savannah Marshal 0–3 in the Round of 16. She also represented India at the 2018 AIBA Women's World Boxing Championship, where she made a first round exit.

Rani represented India in the 80 kg division at the 2025 World Boxing Championships and won a bronze medal after losing in the semi-finals to England's Emily Asquith by 4:1 split decision.
