= Aida Abikeyeva =

Kazakhstani boxer (born 1998)

Personal information
- Nationality: Kazakhstani
- Born: 11 July 1998 (age 28) Karaganda, Kazakhstan

Boxing career
- Reach: 1.70 m (67 in)
Medal record
Women's amateur boxing
Representing Kazakhstan
World Championships
Gold medal – first place	2025 Liverpool	65 kg
IBA World Championships
Gold medal – first place	2025 Niš	Light welterweight
Asian Championships
Gold medal – first place	2024 Chiang Mai	Light welterweight

Aida Abikeyeva (Kazakh: Аида Әбікеева; born 11 July 1998) is a Kazakhstani boxer who competes in the light welterweight division. She is a gold medalist at the Asian Championships, IBA World Championships and the World Boxing Championships.

== Amateur career ==
At the 2024 Asian Amateur Boxing Championships, Abikeyeva won the gold medal by defeating Hà Thị Linh in the final.

Abikeyeva competed in the light welterweight category of the 2025 IBA Women's World Boxing Championships held in Niš, Serbia. She defeated Zhao Shuoyu in the round of 16, Esmanur Lök in the quarterfinals and Elena Babicheva in the semifinals. In the final match, she defeated Thananya Somnuek 5–0. At Stage II of the 2025 World Boxing Cup, she reached the semifinals and lost to Busenaz Sürmeneli, the latter in whom went on to win the silver medal.

Abikeyeva competed in the 65 kg category of the 2025 World Boxing Championships held in Liverpool, England. She defeated Kang Su-kyoung in the round of 16, Busenaz Sürmeneli in the quarterfinals and Gráinne Walsh in the semifinals. In the final match, she defeated Navbakhor Khamidova 3–0.
