= Viktoria Penney =

Canadian boxer (born 2002)

Personal information
- Nationality: (Canada) Canadian
- Born: 14 September 2002 (age 23)

Sport
- Sport: Boxing
- Weight class: Light-heavyweight
- Club: Sully's Boxing Gym
Medal record
Women's amateur boxing
Representing Canada
World Boxing Championships
| Bronze medal – third place | 2025 Liverpool | 80 kg |

Viktoria Penney (born 14 September 2002) is a Canadian boxer. After taking up the sport aged 14, she won the national 80kg title in 2024. Penney won a bronze medal in the 80kg division at the 2025 World Boxing Championships in Liverpool, England, defeating China's Zhong Qimeng by stoppage in the quarter-finals, then losing to Australia's Eseta Flint on a unanimous decision in the semi-finals.
