= Navbakhor Khamidova =

Uzbekistani boxer (born 2001)

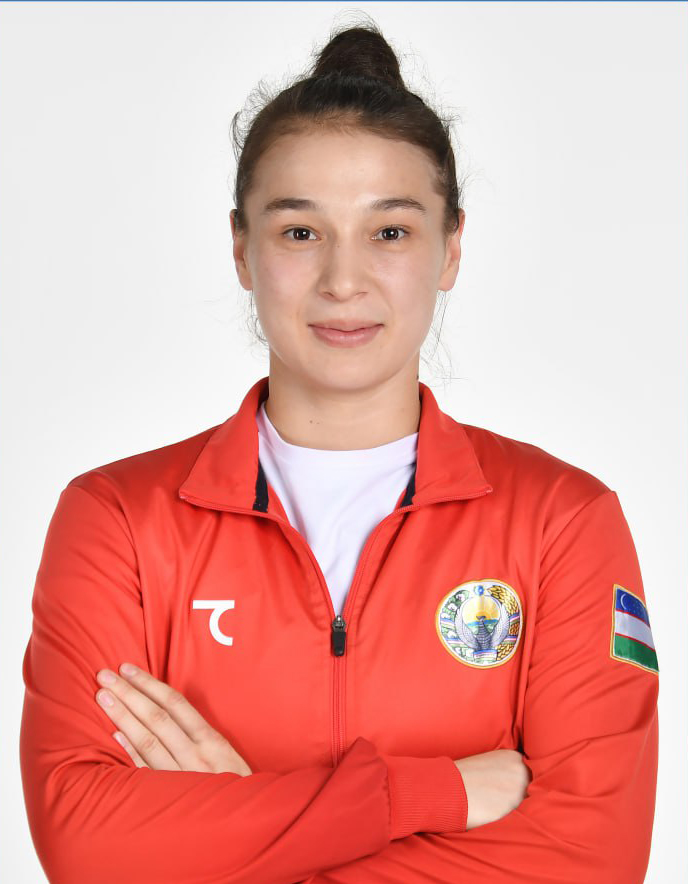

Personal information
- Nationality: Uzbekistani
- Born: 7 February 2001 (age 25) Samarkand, Uzbekistan

Boxing career
- Reach: 1.70 m (67 in)
Medal record
Women's amateur boxing
Representing Uzbekistan
World Championships
Silver medal – second place	2025 Liverpool	65 kg
IBA World Championships
Silver medal – second place	2025 Niš	Welterweight
Bronze medal – third place	2023 New Delhi	Welterweight
World Military Boxing Championships
Gold medal – first place	2021 Moscow	Welterweight
Asian Championships
Gold medal – first place	2022 Amman	Welterweight
Gold medal – first place	2024 Chiang Mai	Welterweight
Silver medal – second place	2021 Dubai	Welterweight

Navbakhor Nishon kizi Khamidova (Uzbek: Навбаҳор Нишон қизи Ҳамидова, romanized: Navbahor Nishon qizi Hamidova; born 7 February 2001) is an Uzbekistani boxer who competes in the welterweight division. She has won two medals at the IBA Women's World Boxing Championships and a silver medal at the World Boxing Championships. She is also a two-time medalist at the Asian Amateur Boxing Championships.

== Amateur career ==
Khamidova won the silver medal at the 2021 Asian Championships after losing to Valentina Khalzova. She would win the gold medal the following year at the 2022 Asian Championships, having defeated Choi Hong-eun.

At the end of September 2021, Khamidova won a bronze medal at the 58th Military World Championship in Moscow (Russia) held under the auspices of the International Military Sports Council. In the semifinal, she had lost to Saadat Dalgatova, the latter in whom went on to win the gold medal.

In March 2023, Khamidova competed at the IBA Women's World Boxing Championships, losing to Imane Khelif in the quarterfinals; however, Khelif was disqualified for failing to meet the International Boxing Association's (IBA) eligibility criteria. According to the Algerian Olympic Committee, Khelif was disqualified due to medical reasons; later reports indicated her testosterone levels were too high to compete. Khamidova was thus awarded a bronze medal.

Khamidova competed in the welterweight category of the 2025 IBA Women's World Boxing Championships held in Niš, Serbia. She defeated Gráinne Walsh in the first round, Mounia Toutire in the quarterfinals and Albina Moldazhanova in the semifinals. In the final match, she lost to her Turkish opponent Busenaz Sürmeneli 5-0.

Khamidova competed in the 65 kg category of the 2025 World Boxing Championships held in Liverpool, England. She defeated Oshin Derieuw in the round of 16, Sacha Hickey in the quarterfinals and Chen Nien-chin in the semifinals. In the final match, she lost to Aida Abikeyeva 3-0.
