= 2024 Asian Amateur Boxing Championships =

2024 Asian Boxing Championships
- Venue: Maejo University Sports Complex
- Location: Chiang Mai, Thailand
- Dates: 30 November – 11 December 2024

The 2024 Asian Amateur Boxing Championships were held from 30 November to 11 December 2024 in Chiang Mai, Thailand.

== Medal summary ==
=== Men ===
Event	Gold	Silver	Bronze
Light flyweight (48 kg)	Shodiyorjon Melikuziev; Uzbekistan	Sanzhar Tashkenbay; Kazakhstan	Jay Bryan Baricuatro; Philippines
Light flyweight (48 kg)	Shodiyorjon Melikuziev; Uzbekistan	Sanzhar Tashkenbay; Kazakhstan	Kazuma Aratake; Japan
Flyweight (51 kg)	Asilbek Jalilov; Uzbekistan	Marvin Tabamo; Philippines	Umayanga Mihiran; Sri Lanka
Flyweight (51 kg)	Asilbek Jalilov; Uzbekistan	Marvin Tabamo; Philippines	Hsu Po-hao; Chinese Taipei
Bantamweight (54 kg)	Makhmud Sabyrkhan; Kazakhstan	Shakhzod Muzafarov; Uzbekistan	Sarawut Sukthet; Thailand
Bantamweight (54 kg)	Makhmud Sabyrkhan; Kazakhstan	Shakhzod Muzafarov; Uzbekistan	Yelmir Nabiiev; Ukraine
Featherweight (57 kg)	Mirazizbek Mirzakhalilov; Uzbekistan	Orazbek Assylkulov; Kazakhstan	Gantömöriin Lundaa; Mongolia
Featherweight (57 kg)	Mirazizbek Mirzakhalilov; Uzbekistan	Orazbek Assylkulov; Kazakhstan	Ian Clark Bautista; Philippines
Lightweight (60 kg)	Akmal Ubaidov; Tajikistan	Sota Nakayma; Japan	Ryspek Bektenov; Kyrgyzstan
Lightweight (60 kg)	Akmal Ubaidov; Tajikistan	Sota Nakayma; Japan	Aider Abduraimov; Ukraine
Light welterweight (63.5 kg)	Adkhamjon Mukhiddinov; Uzbekistan	Somchay Wongsuwan; Thailand	Mark Ashley Fajardo; Philippines
Light welterweight (63.5 kg)	Adkhamjon Mukhiddinov; Uzbekistan	Somchay Wongsuwan; Thailand	Mirzokhid Imamnazarov; Kyrgyzstan
Welterweight (67 kg)	Mujibillo Tursunov; Uzbekistan	Dulat Bekbauov; Kazakhstan	Shukrat Salomatov; Tajikistan
Welterweight (67 kg)	Mujibillo Tursunov; Uzbekistan	Dulat Bekbauov; Kazakhstan	Bunjong Sinsiri; Thailand
Light middleweight (71 kg)	Ablaikhan Zhussupov; Kazakhstan	Khavasbek Asadullaev; Uzbekistan	Otgonbaataryn Byamba-Erdene; Mongolia
Light middleweight (71 kg)	Ablaikhan Zhussupov; Kazakhstan	Khavasbek Asadullaev; Uzbekistan	Shokhobzhon Shukurov; Tajikistan
Middleweight (75 kg)	Javokhir Ummataliev; Uzbekistan	Dias Molzhigitov; Kazakhstan	Liu Cheng-en; Chinese Taipei
Middleweight (75 kg)	Javokhir Ummataliev; Uzbekistan	Dias Molzhigitov; Kazakhstan	Pavlo Illiusha; Ukraine
Light heavyweight (80 kg)	Turabek Khabibullaev; Uzbekistan	Wang Jinxiang; China	Yerassyl Zhakpekov; Kazakhstan
Light heavyweight (80 kg)	Turabek Khabibullaev; Uzbekistan	Wang Jinxiang; China	Anvar Nasredinov; Cambodia
Cruiserweight (86 kg)	Bekzad Nurdauletov; Kazakhstan	Jasurbek Yuldoshev; Uzbekistan	Ahmadjon Saidov; Tajikistan
Cruiserweight (86 kg)	Bekzad Nurdauletov; Kazakhstan	Jasurbek Yuldoshev; Uzbekistan	Danylo Zhasan; Ukraine
Heavyweight (92 kg)	Sagyndyk Togambay; Kazakhstan	Parviz Karimov; Tajikistan	Liu Taimiao; China
Heavyweight (92 kg)	Sagyndyk Togambay; Kazakhstan	Parviz Karimov; Tajikistan	Bogdan Tolmachov; Ukraine
Super heavyweight (+92 kg)	Aibek Oralbay; Kazakhstan	Abudurexiti Remula; China	Khaligiin Byeknur; Mongolia
Super heavyweight (+92 kg)	Aibek Oralbay; Kazakhstan	Abudurexiti Remula; China	Jakhongir Zokirov; Uzbekistan

=== Women ===
Event	Gold	Silver	Bronze
Minimumweight (48 kg)	Farzona Fozilova; Uzbekistan	Ngô Ngọc Linh Chi; Vietnam	Aigerim Sattibayeva; Kazakhstan
Minimumweight (48 kg)	Farzona Fozilova; Uzbekistan	Ngô Ngọc Linh Chi; Vietnam	Guo Yi-xuan; Chinese Taipei
Light flyweight (50 kg)	Chuthamat Raksat; Thailand	Nguyễn Thị Ngọc Trân; Vietnam	Sabina Bobokulova; Uzbekistan
Light flyweight (50 kg)	Chuthamat Raksat; Thailand	Nguyễn Thị Ngọc Trân; Vietnam	Chiu Ching-yu; Chinese Taipei
Flyweight (52 kg)	Feruza Kazakova; Uzbekistan	Svitlana Umanska; Ukraine	Zhazira Urakbayeva; Kazakhstan
Flyweight (52 kg)	Feruza Kazakova; Uzbekistan	Svitlana Umanska; Ukraine	Yara Al-Amri; Saudi Arabia
Bantamweight (54 kg)	Natnicha Chongprongklang; Thailand	Aziza Yokubova; Uzbekistan	Inna Statkevych; Ukraine
Bantamweight (54 kg)	Natnicha Chongprongklang; Thailand	Aziza Yokubova; Uzbekistan	Xu Wenqian; China
Featherweight (57 kg)	Punrawee Ruenros; Thailand	Nigina Uktamova; Uzbekistan	Riza Pasuit; Philippines
Featherweight (57 kg)	Punrawee Ruenros; Thailand	Nigina Uktamova; Uzbekistan	Ulzhan Sarsenbek; Kazakhstan
Lightweight (60 kg)	Viktoriya Grafeyeva; Kazakhstan	Li Qiange; China	Porntip Buapa; Thailand
Lightweight (60 kg)	Viktoriya Grafeyeva; Kazakhstan	Li Qiange; China	Tetiana Dovhal; Ukraine
Light welterweight (63 kg)	Aida Abikeyeva; Kazakhstan	Hà Thị Linh; Vietnam	Ganzorigiin Badmaarag; Mongolia
Light welterweight (63 kg)	Aida Abikeyeva; Kazakhstan	Hà Thị Linh; Vietnam	Thananya Somnuek; Thailand
Welterweight (66 kg)	Navbakhor Khamidova; Uzbekistan	Yuan Huiping; China	Mariia Bova; Ukraine
Welterweight (66 kg)	Navbakhor Khamidova; Uzbekistan	Yuan Huiping; China	Milana Safronova; Kazakhstan
Light middleweight (70 kg)	Natalya Bogdanova; Kazakhstan	Baison Manikon; Thailand	Hoàng Ngọc Mai; Vietnam
Light middleweight (70 kg)	Natalya Bogdanova; Kazakhstan	Baison Manikon; Thailand	Anastasiia Chernokolenko; Ukraine
Middleweight (75 kg)	Wang Lina; China	Aziza Zokirova; Uzbekistan	Diana Magauyayeva; Kazakhstan
Middleweight (75 kg)	Wang Lina; China	Aziza Zokirova; Uzbekistan	Mariya Borutsa; Ukraine
Light heavyweight (81 kg)	Gulsaya Yerzhan; Kazakhstan	Karine Airapetian; Ukraine	Sokhiba Ruzmetova; Uzbekistan
Light heavyweight (81 kg)	Gulsaya Yerzhan; Kazakhstan	Karine Airapetian; Ukraine	None awarded
Heavyweight (+81 kg)	Yeldana Talipova; Kazakhstan	Oltinoy Sotimboeva; Uzbekistan	Mariia Lovchynska; Ukraine
Heavyweight (+81 kg)	Yeldana Talipova; Kazakhstan	Oltinoy Sotimboeva; Uzbekistan	None awarded

== Medal table ==
Rank	Nation	Gold	Silver	Bronze	Total
1	Uzbekistan	10	7	3	20
2	Kazakhstan	10	4	6	20
3	Thailand	3	2	4	9
4	China	1	4	2	7
5	Tajikistan	1	1	3	5
6	Vietnam	0	3	1	4
7	Ukraine	0	2	11	13
8	Philippines	0	1	4	5
9	Japan	0	1	1	2
10	Chinese Taipei	0	0	4	4
10	Mongolia	0	0	4	4
12	Kyrgyzstan	0	0	2	2
13	Cambodia	0	0	1	1
13	Saudi Arabia	0	0	1	1
13	Sri Lanka	0	0	1	1
Totals (15 entries)		25	25	48	98
