= 2025 World Boxing Championships – Men's +90 kg =

Competition at amateur boxing tournament

Men's +90 kg at the 2025 World Boxing Championships
- Venue: Liverpool Arena
- Location: Liverpool, England
- Dates: 5–14 September
- Competitors: 30 from 30 nations

Medalists
gold medal	Aibek Oralbay	Kazakhstan
silver medal	Jakhongir Zokirov	Uzbekistan
bronze medal	Bayikewuzi Danabieke	China
bronze medal	Julio César La Cruz	Cuba

The Men's +90 kg competition at the 2025 World Boxing Championships was held from 5 to 14 September 2025.

== Results ==
=== Final ===
Final; 14 September
Jakhongir Zokirov (UZB)	2
Aibek Oralbay (KAZ)	3

=== Top half ===
Preliminaries; 5 September
Narender Berwal (IND)	4
Martin McDonagh (IRL)	1
Kelvin Watts (USA)	4
Algirdas Baniulis (LTU)	1
Yordan Hernández (BUL)	2
Bayikewuzi Danabieke (CHN)	3
Dmytro Lovchynskyi (UKR)	0
Omar Shiha (NOR)	5
Ju Tae-ung (KOR)	0
Ahmed Hagag (AUT)	5
Jakhongir Zokirov (UZB)	5
Mourad Kadi (ALG)	0
José Agustín (DOM)	0
Nikita Putilov (GER)	5

Round of 16; 8 September
Diego Lenzi (ITA)	4
Narender Berwal (IND)	1
Kelvin Watts (USA)	0
Bayikewuzi Danabieke (CHN)	5
Omar Shiha (NOR)	4
Ahmed Hagag (AUT)	0
Jakhongir Zokirov (UZB)	5
Nikita Putilov (GER)	0

Quarter-finals; 10 September
Diego Lenzi (ITA)	1
Bayikewuzi Danabieke (CHN)	4
Omar Shiha (NOR)	0
Jakhongir Zokirov (UZB)	5

Semi-finals; 12 September
Bayikewuzi Danabieke (CHN)	0
Jakhongir Zokirov (UZB)	5

=== Bottom half ===
Preliminaries; 5 September
Joel da Silva (BRA)	5
Dylan Rajić (BIH)	0
Merzakir Koshaliev (KGZ)	0
Damar Thomas (ENG)	5
Amir Esmaeili (IRI)	3
Oskar Kopera (POL)	2
Mahammad Abdullayev (AZE)	0
Julio César La Cruz (CUB)	5
Miracle Ki (SAM)
Luka Pratljačić (CRO)	KO
Mitchell Barton (SCO)
Stylianos Roulias (GRE)	RSC
Mücahit İlyas (TUR)	5
Döwlet Yslamow (TKM)	0

Round of 16; 8 September
Joel da Silva (BRA)	0
Damar Thomas (ENG)	5
Amir Esmaeili (IRI)	0
Julio César La Cruz (CUB)	5
Luka Pratljačić (CRO)	5
Stylianos Roulias (GRE)	0
Mücahit İlyas (TUR)	0
Aibek Oralbay (KAZ)	5

Quarter-finals; 10 September
Damar Thomas (ENG)	1
Julio César La Cruz (CUB)	4
Luka Pratljačić (CRO)	0
Aibek Oralbay (KAZ)	5

Semi-finals; 12 September
Julio César La Cruz (CUB)	2
Aibek Oralbay (KAZ)	3
