= 2025 World Boxing Championships – Men's 50 kg =

Competition at amateur boxing tournament

Men's 50 kg at the 2025 World Boxing Championships
- Venue: Liverpool Arena
- Location: Liverpool, England
- Dates: 5–14 September
- Competitors: 25 from 25 nations

Medalists
gold medal	Sanzhar Tashkenbay	Kazakhstan
silver medal	Aldarkhishigiin Battulga	Mongolia
bronze medal	Alejandro Claro	Cuba
bronze medal	Soushi Makino	Japan

The Men's 50 kg competition at the 2025 World Boxing Championships was held from 5 to 14 September 2025.

== Results ==
=== Final ===
Final; 14 September
Sanzhar Tashkenbay (KAZ)	5
Aldarkhishigiin Battulga (MGL)	0

=== Top half ===
Preliminaries; 5 September
István Szaka (HUN)	5
Siiovush Mukhammadiiev (UKR)	0
Samet Gümüş (TUR)	4
Anvarzhan Khodzhiev (KGZ)	1
Fredelin de los Santos (DOM)	1
Subhan Mamedov (AZE)	4
Salvatore Attrattivo (ITA)	2
Reece Readshaw (ENG)	3
Huthaifa Eshish (JOR)	3
Louis Rooney (IRL)	2

Round of 16; 9 September
Alejandro Claro (CUB)	4
István Szaka (HUN)	1
Samet Gümüş (TUR)	3
Subhan Mamedov (AZE)	1
Jadumani Singh (IND)	5
Reece Readshaw (ENG)	0
Huthaifa Eshish (JOR)	2
Sanzhar Tashkenbay (KAZ)	3

Quarter-finals; 12 September
Alejandro Claro (CUB)	3
Samet Gümüş (TUR)	2
Jadumani Singh (IND)	0
Sanzhar Tashkenbay (KAZ)	4

Semi-finals; 13 September
Alejandro Claro (CUB)	1
Sanzhar Tashkenbay (KAZ)	4

=== Bottom half ===
Preliminaries; 5 September
Sakhil Alakhverdovi (GEO)	5
Scott Richards (WAL)	0
Nawaf Awaji (KSA)
Shodiyorjon Melikuziev (UZB)	KO
Ergyunal Sebahtin (BUL)	0
Martín Molina (ESP)	5
Jakub Słomiński (POL)	0
Yoon Tae-geun (KOR)	5

Round of 16; 9 September
Soushi Makino (JPN)	5
Sakhil Alakhverdovi (GEO)	0
Shodiyorjon Melikuziev (UZB)	5
Omer Izaz (AUS)	0
Jay Baricuatro (PHI)	2
Martín Molina (ESP)	3
Yoon Tae-geun (KOR)	1
Aldarkhishigiin Battulga (MGL)	4

Quarter-finals; 12 September
Soushi Makino (JPN)	3
Shodiyorjon Melikuziev (UZB)	2
Martín Molina (ESP)	1
Aldarkhishigiin Battulga (MGL)	3

Semi-finals; 13 September
Soushi Makino (JPN)	2
Aldarkhishigiin Battulga (MGL)	3
