= Aldarkhishigiin Battulga =

Mongolian boxer

Personal information
- Nationality: Mongolia

Boxing career
Medal record
Men's amateur boxing
Representing Mongolia
World Championships
Silver medal – second place	2025 Liverpool	50 kg
World Cup Final
Gold medal – first place	2024 Sheffield	51 kg

Aldarkhishigiin Battulga is a Mongolian boxer. He competed at the 2025 World Boxing Championships, winning the silver medal in the men's 50 kg event.
