= 2025 World Boxing Championships – Women's +80 kg =

Competition at amateur boxing tournament

Women's +80 kg at the 2025 World Boxing Championships
- Venue: Liverpool Arena
- Location: Liverpool, England
- Dates: 6–13 September
- Competitors: 10 from 10 nations

Medalists
gold medal	Agata Kaczmarska	Poland
silver medal	Nupur Sheoran	India
bronze medal	Şeyma Düztaş	Turkey
bronze medal	Yeldana Talipova	Kazakhstan

The Women's +80 kg competition at the 2025 World Boxing Championships was held from 6 to 13 September 2025.

== Results ==
Round of 16; 6 September
Oltinoy Sotimboeva (UZB)	5
Mariia Lovchynska (UKR)	0
Grace Buckle (ENG)	1
Celine Lee-Lo (NZL)	4

Quarter-finals; 10 September
Nupur Sheoran (IND)	4
Oltinoy Sotimboeva (UZB)	1
Şeyma Düztaş (TUR)	RSC
Noof Al-Yousef (KSA)
Zhan Yilian (CHN)	0
Agata Kaczmarska (POL)	5
Celine Lee-Lo (NZL)	1
Yeldana Talipova (KAZ)	4

Semi-finals; 12 September
Nupur Sheoran (IND)	5
Şeyma Düztaş (TUR)	0
Agata Kaczmarska (POL)	5
Yeldana Talipova (KAZ)	0

Final; 13 September
Nupur Sheoran (IND)	2
Agata Kaczmarska (POL)	3
