= Soushi Makino =

Japanese boxer

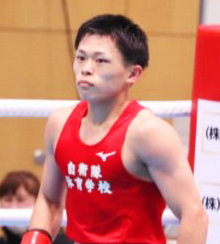
- Makino in 2024

Personal information
- Born: 22 March 1999 (age 27) Asaka, Saitama, Japan

Boxing career
Medal record
Men's amateur boxing
Representing Japan
World Championships
Bronze medal – third place	2025 Liverpool	50 kg

Soushi Makino (牧野 草子, Makino Soushi; born 22 March 1999) is a Japanese boxer. He competed at the 2025 World Boxing Championships, winning the bronze medal in the men's 50 kg event.
