= 2025 IBA Women's World Boxing Championships – Welterweight =

Welterweight at the 2025 IBA Women's World Boxing Championships
- Venue: Sportski centar Čair
- Location: Niš, Serbia
- Dates: 11–14 March (preliminaries/semifinals); 16 March (final)
- Competitors: 15 from 15 nations

Medalists
| gold medal | Busenaz Sürmeneli | Turkey |
| silver medal | Navbakhor Khamidova | Uzbekistan |
| bronze medal | Anastasija Lukajić | Serbia |
| bronze medal | Albina Moldazhanova | Russia |

The Welterweight competition at the 2025 IBA Women's World Boxing Championships was held from 11 to 16 March 2025.

== Results ==
Round of 16
(Kenya) Asiko Friza Anyango | 0
(Slovakia) Tamara Kubalová | 5
(South Africa) Thabisile Cimi
(Serbia) Anastasija Lukajić | w/o
(Romania) Andra Sebe | 4
(Puerto Rico) Stephanie Piñeiro | 0
(Cape Verde) Ivanusa Moreira | 0
(Kazakhstan) Zhasmin Kizatova | 5
(China) Zhou Pan
(Russia) Albina Moldazhanova | RSC
(Morocco) Mounia Toutire | 5
(Mexico) María Rodríguez | 0
(Republic of Ireland) Gráinne Walsh | 0
(Uzbekistan) Navbakhor Khamidova | 4

Quarter-finals
(Turkey) Busenaz Sürmeneli | 5
(Slovakia) Tamara Kubalová | 0
(Serbia) Anastasija Lukajić | 5
(Romania) Andra Sebe | 0
(Kazakhstan) Zhasmin Kizatova
(Russia) Albina Moldazhanova | RSC
(Morocco) Mounia Toutire | 0
(Uzbekistan) Navbakhor Khamidova | 5

Semi-finals
(Turkey) Busenaz Sürmeneli | 5
(Serbia) Anastasija Lukajić | 0
(Russia) Albina Moldazhanova | 3
(Uzbekistan) Navbakhor Khamidova | 4

Final
(Turkey) Busenaz Sürmeneli | 5
(Uzbekistan) Navbakhor Khamidova | 0
