= 2025 World Boxing Championships – Women's 80 kg =

Competition at amateur boxing tournament

Women's 80 kg at the 2025 World Boxing Championships
- Venue: Liverpool Arena
- Location: Liverpool, England
- Dates: 8–14 September
- Competitors: 12 from 12 nations

Medalists
gold medal	Eseta Flint	Australia
silver medal	Emily Asquith	England
bronze medal	Viktoria Penney	Canada
bronze medal	Pooja Rani	India

The Women's 80 kg competition at the 2025 World Boxing Championships is held from 8 to 14 September 2025.

== Results ==
Round of 16; 8 September
Iveta Lešinskytė (LTU)	2
Gulsaya Yerzhan (KAZ)	3
Zhong Qimeng (CHN)	5
Zhraa Alqrache (KSA)	0
Iryna Lutsak (UKR)	0
Emily Asquith (ENG)	5
Aleyna Mehmed (BUL)	0
Emilia Koterska (POL)	5

Quarter-finals; 10 September
Eseta Flint (AUS)	5
Gulsaya Yerzhan (KAZ)	0
Zhong Qimeng (CHN)
Viktoria Penney (CAN)	RSC
Elif Güneri (TUR)	0
Emily Asquith (ENG)	5
Emilia Koterska (POL)	2
Pooja Rani (IND)	3

Semi-finals; 13 September
Eseta Flint (AUS)	5
Viktoria Penney (CAN)	0
Emily Asquith (ENG)	4
Pooja Rani (IND)	1

Final; 14 September
Eseta Flint (AUS)	5
Emily Asquith (ENG)	0
