= Akmaljon Isroilov =

Uzbek boxer

Personal information
- Nationality: Uzbekistan

Boxing career
Medal record
Men's amateur boxing
Representing Uzbekistan
World Championships
Gold medal – first place	2025 Liverpool	85 kg

Akmaljon Isroilov is an Uzbek boxer. He competed at the 2025 World Boxing Championships, winning the gold medal in the men's 85 kg event.

== Career ==
Representing Uzbekistan, Isroilov competed in the 2024 Asian Youth Boxing Championships in the 86 kg division, where he defeated Imangali Nurpeis in the gold medal match. He then competed in the 86 kg division at the 2024 IBA Youth World Boxing Championships in Budva, Montenegro, where he defeated Amir Reza Malek-Khatabi in the final, winning the gold medal.

Isroilov competed in the 85 kg category at the 2025 World Boxing Championships in Liverpool, England. In his opening bout, he defeated Lachlan Lawson via unanimous decision. Isroilov then faced Adrián Fresneda and won by unanimous decision their quarter-final contest, before defeating Michael Derouiche by unanimous decision in the semi-finals. He won in the final defeating Teagn Stott via unanimous decision and was therefore awarded a gold medal.
