= Nupur Sheoran =

Indian boxer

Personal information
- Born: 26 September 1998 (age 27) Umerwas, Haryana, India
- Height: 1.83 m (6 ft 0 in)

Boxing career
- Weight class: Heavyweight
Medal record
Women's amateur boxing
Representing India
World Championships
Silver medal – second place	2025 Liverpool	+80kg
World Cup
Gold medal – first place	2025 Astana	+80kg
Gold medal – first place	2025 New Delhi	+80kg
BRICS Games
Bronze medal – third place	2024 Kazan	+80kg

Nupur Sheoran (born 26 September 1998) is an Indian heavyweight boxer. A five-time national champion, she is a two-time gold medallist at the 2025 World Boxing Cup and silver medallist at the 2025 World Boxing Championships. She is the granddaughter of boxing legend Hawa Singh.
