= Kaczmarski =

Kaczmarski (feminine: Kaczmarska) is a Polish surname. Notable people with the surname include:

- Agata Kaczmarska (born 1998), Polish boxer
- Beata Kaczmarska (born 1970), Polish racewalker
- Iwo Kaczmarski (born 2004), Polish footballer
- Jacek Kaczmarski (1957–2004), Polish singer, songwriter, poet, and writer
- Kevin Kaczmarski (born 1991), American baseball player
- Nicole Kaczmarski (born 1981), American basketball player and sports announcer
