= Emily Asquith =

English boxer (born 2003)

Personal information
- Nationality: English
- Born: 16 December 2002 (age 23)

Sport
- Sport: Boxing
- Weight class: Light-heavyweight
- Club: Sheffield City Boxing Club
Medal record
Women's amateur boxing
Representing England
World Boxing Championships
Silver medal – second place	2025 Liverpool	80 kg
European Youth Boxing Championships
Gold medal – first place	2019 Sofia	81 kg
European Junior Boxing Championships
Gold medal – first place	2018 Anapa	80 kg

Emily Asquith (born 16 December 2002) is an English amateur boxer. She won a silver medal in the 80 kg division at the 2025 World Boxing Championships. Asquith also won gold medals in the light-heavyweight category at the 2018 European Junior Boxing Championships and 2019 European Youth Boxing Championships.

== Career ==
Having started boxing aged 11, Asquith won the gold medal in the 80 kg division at the 2018 European Junior Boxing Championships in Anapa, Russia, defeating Poland's Martyna Jancelewicz by unanimous decision in the final.

A southpaw, she followed this up by taking the 81 kg gold at the 2019 European Youth Boxing Championships in Sofia, Bulgaria, winning the final against Elanur Sagit from Turkey via unanimous decision.

After almost two years out of the sport due to a hand injury, Asquith won her first senior national elite title in April 2025, stopping Paige Ford in round one of the 81 kg final at Derby Arena.

She was selected to represent England in the 80 kg category at the 2025 World Boxing Championships in Liverpool. Asquith defeated reigning European Under-23 champion Iryna Lutsak of Ukraine and six-time world championship medalist Elif Güneri from Turkey, both via unanimous decision, to reach the semi-finals, where she beat India's Pooja Rani by 4:1 split decision. She lost in the final to Australia's Eseta Flint via unanimous decision and was therefore awarded a silver medal.

Asquith was chosen to be part of the England squad for the 2026 European Championships in Sofia, Bulgaria. Competing in the 80 kg category, she lost in the quarter-finals to eventual champion Lisa O'Rourke from Ireland by unanimous decision.

== Personal life ==
Asquith studied sports and exercise science at Sheffield Hallam University and works as a teaching assistant.
