= Baricuatro =

Baricuatro is a surname. Notable people with the surname include:

- Jay Baricuatro (born 2001/2002), Filipino boxer
- Pam Baricuatro (born 1966), Filipino politician
