= 2025 World Boxing Championships – Men's 85 kg =

Competition at amateur boxing tournament

Men's 85 kg at the 2025 World Boxing Championships
- Venue: Liverpool Arena
- Location: Liverpool, England
- Dates: 4–14 September
- Competitors: 24 from 24 nations

Medalists
gold medal	Akmaljon Isroilov	Uzbekistan
silver medal	Teagn Stott	England
bronze medal	Danylo Zhasan	Ukraine
bronze medal	Michael Derouiche	Austria

The Men's 85 kg competition at the 2025 World Boxing Championships was held from 4 to 14 September 2025.

== Results ==
=== Final ===
Final; 14 September
Teagn Stott (ENG)	0
Akmaljon Isroilov (UZB)	5

=== Top half ===
Preliminaries; 4 September
Georgii Kushitashvili (GEO)	5
Petar Leskur (CRO)	0
Ammar Abduljabbar (GER)	1
Danylo Zhasan (UKR)	4
Semion Boldirev (BUL)	4
Vincenzo Lizzi (ITA)	1
Mihaly Batori (HUN)	0
Daniel Komárek (CZE)	5

Round of 16; 8 September
Bekzad Nurdauletov (KAZ)	2
Georgii Kushitashvili (GEO)	3
Danylo Zhasan (UKR)	5
Brian Kennedy (IRL)	0
Samet Ersoy (TUR)	2
Semion Boldirev (BUL)	3
Daniel Komárek (CZE)	1
Teagn Stott (ENG)	4

Quarter-finals; 12 September
Georgii Kushitashvili (GEO)	1
Danylo Zhasan (UKR)	4
Semion Boldirev (BUL)
Teagn Stott (ENG)	RSC

Semi-finals; 13 September
Danylo Zhasan (UKR)	1
Teagn Stott (ENG)	4

=== Bottom half ===
Preliminaries; 4 September
Surat Garayev (AZE)
Lachlan Lawson (AUS)	RSC
Sinembio Leganase (BEL)	3
Patricio Polonia (DOM)	2
Sakiusa Narara (FIJ)
Aryan Saed Panah (ART)	RSC
Darius Voišnarovič (LTU)	0
Robert McNulty (SCO)	5

Round of 16; 8 September
Akmaljon Isroilov (UZB)	5
Lachlan Lawson (AUS)	0
Sinembio Leganase (BEL)	0
Adrián Fresneda (ESP)	5
Michael Derouiche (AUT)	3
Aryan Saed Panah (ART)	2
Robert McNulty (SCO)	5
Jugnoo Ahlawat (IND)	0

Quarter-finals; 12 September
Akmaljon Isroilov (UZB)	5
Adrián Fresneda (ESP)	0
Michael Derouiche (AUT)	3
Robert McNulty (SCO)	0

Semi-finals; 13 September
Akmaljon Isroilov (UZB)	5
Michael Derouiche (AUT)	0
