= Jay Baricuatro =

Filipino boxer

Personal information
- Nationality: Philippines
- Born: Jay Bryan Baricuatro; 2001 or 2002 (age 23–24)

Boxing career
Medal record
Men's amateur boxing
Representing Philippines
World Cup
Silver medal – second place	2025 Astana	50 kg
Southeast Asian Games
Silver medal – second place	2025 Thailand	Light flyweight

Jay Bryan Baricuatro (born 2001/2002) is a Filipino boxer. He competed in the men's 50 kg event at the 2025 World Boxing Championships.
