= Jakhongir Zokirov =

Uzbekistani boxer (born 2003)

Personal information
- Nationality: Uzbekistan
- Born: 17.05.2003
- Height: 198 cm (6 ft 6 in)
- Weight: +92 kg (203 lb)

Boxing career
Medal record
Men's amateur boxing
Representing Uzbekistan
World Championships
Silver medal – second place	2025 Liverpool	+90 kg
Asian Championships
Bronze medal – third place	2024 Chiang Mai	Super heavyweight
Youth World Championships
Gold medal – first place	2021 Kielce	Super heavyweight
ASBC Asian U22 Boxing Championships
Gold medal – first place	2022 Tashkent	Super heavyweight

Jakhongir Zokirov (uzb: Jahongir Zokirov; born May 17, 2003, in Jizzakh, Uzbekistan) is an Uzbekistani boxer, who competes in the super heavyweight category. He won the gold medal at the 2021 AIBA Youth World Boxing Championships and in the 2022 U22 Asian Championship in Tashkent, Uzbekistan in the same weight category.

== Biography ==
Zokirov was born in the Jizzakh region on May 17, 2003. He started participating in International tournaments in junior team 2015. His first boxing trainer is Lazizbek Zokirov (master of sports) former amateur boxer.

=== Amateur career ===
2021 Youth World Championships – 1st place

ASBC Asian U22 Boxing Championships – 1st place

2024 Strandja Tournament –1st place

Great Silk Road Baku – 1st place

== Professional career ==
On 14 October 2023, Zokirov made his professional debut against Guillermo Del Rio. He won the fight by a fourth-round technical knockout.

=== Professional boxing record ===
3 fights	3 wins	0 losses
By knockout	3	0

No.	Result	Record	Opponent	Type	Round, time	Date	Location	Notes
3	Win	3–0	Brandon Colantonio	RTD	1 (6), 3:00	14 Nov 2026	The Venue, Riyadh, Saudi Arabia	
2	Win	2–0	Zach Spiller	TKO	2 (6), 2:02	28 Jun 2026	Cosmopolitan of Las Vegas, Paradise, Nevada, U.S.	
1	Win	1–0	Guillermo Del Rio	TKO	4 (4), 0:40	14 Oct 2023	Fort Bend Epicenter, Rosenberg, Texas, U.S.	

== Personal life ==
Zokirov is the son of Lazizbek Zokirov and brother of Aziza Zokirova, both boxers.
