= England Boxing National Amateur Championships Cruiserweight Champions =

English Boxing competition

England Boxing National Amateur Championships Cruiserweight Champions (U85kg)
- Status: active
- Genre: Boxing
- Inaugurated: 1998
- Organiser: England Boxing

The England Boxing National Amateur Championships Cruiserweight Championship formerly known as the ABA Championships is the primary English amateur boxing championship. It had previously been contested by all the nations of the United Kingdom.

== History ==
The cruiserweight division is the newest division only being inaugurated in 1998 and is currently contested in the under-85 Kg weight division. The championships are highly regarded in the boxing world and seen as the most prestigious national amateur championships.

== Past winners ==
Year	Winner	Club
1998	Anthony Oakley	Leigh ABC
1999	Mark Krence	St. Michael's ABC
2000	James Dolan	Plains Farm ABC
2001	James Dolan	Plains Farm ABC
2002	James Dolan	Plains Farm ABC
2003–2006	Not held	
2007	Jon-Lewis Dickinson	Birtley ABC
2008	Matty Askin	Pool of Life ABC
2009	Robert Evans	Banbury ABC
2010	Simon Barclay	Corby ABC
2011	Deion Jumah	Dale Youth ABC
2012	Deion Jumah	Dale Youth ABC
2013	Jack Massey	Northside ABC
2014–2016	Not held	
2017	James Branch	Repton ABC
2018	Bryce Goodridge	Basingstoke ABC
2019	Kheron Gilpin	Miguel's ABC
2020	cancelled due to COVID-19.	
2021	Carnell Brown	Army
2022	Ben Andrews	Torbay
2023	Adam Olaore	Empire
2024	Teagn Stott	Sheffield Boxing Centre
2025	Divine Omojor	Tyneside
2026	Dominic Owoo	Barton Hill
