= Sanzhar Tashkenbay =

Kazakh boxer (born 2003)

Sanzhar Tashkenbay Санжар Ташкенбай
Personal information
- Nationality: Kazakh
- Born: 1 June 2003 (age 23)
- Height: 1.71 m (5 ft 7 in)
- Weight: Light flyweight

Boxing career
Medal record
Men's amateur boxing
Representing Kazakhstan
World Championships
Gold medal – first place	2025 Liverpool	50 kg
IBA World Championships
Gold medal – first place	2023 Tashkent	Minimumweight
Asian Championships
Gold medal – first place	2022 Amman	Minimumweight
Silver medal – second place	2024 Chiang Mai	Light flyweight
Youth World Championships
Gold medal – first place	2021 Kielce	Light flyweight

Sanzhar Tashkenbay (, Sanjar Taşkenbai; born 1 June 2003) is a Kazakh amateur boxer who won gold medal at the 2023 World Championships in Tashkent, 2021 Youth World Championships, and 2021 Youth Asian Championships, all in the light flyweight division.
