= Boxing at the 2014 Asian Games – Women's 75 kg =

Boxing competitions

Women's 75 kg at the 2014 Asian Games
- Venue: Seonhak Gymnasium
- Date: 27 September – 1 October 2014
- Competitors: 10 from 10 nations

Medalists
| gold medal | Jang Un-hui | North Korea |
| silver medal | Li Qian | China |
| bronze medal | Marina Volnova | Kazakhstan |
| bronze medal | Pooja Rani | India |

The women's middleweight (75 kilograms) event at the 2014 Asian Games took place from 27 September to 1 October 2014 at Seonhak Gymnasium, Incheon, South Korea.

Like all Asian Games boxing events, the competition was a straight single-elimination tournament. All bouts consisted of three three-minute rounds.

A total of 14 women from 14 countries competed in this event. middleweight division, limited to fighters whose body weight was less than 75 kilograms.

== Schedule ==
All times are Korea Standard Time (UTC+09:00)

| Date | Time | Event |
|---|---|---|
| Saturday, 27 September 2014 | 14:00 | Preliminaries |
| Sunday, 28 September 2014 | 14:00 | Quarterfinals |
| Tuesday, 30 September 2014 | 14:00 | Semifinals |
| Wednesday, 1 October 2014 | 15:00 | Final |

== Results ==
Legend

- KO — Won by knockout
- TKO — Won by technical knockout

Preliminaries
Dara Shen (TPE) | 3
Choi Su-yeon (KOR) | 0
Pooja Rani (IND) | 3
Erdenesoyolyn Undram (MGL) | 0

Quarterfinals
Lê Thị Nhung (VIE) | 0
Marina Volnova (KAZ) | 3
Jang Un-hui (PRK) | TKO
Shakhnoza Nizamova (UZB)
Shiromala Weerarathna (SRI)
Li Qian (CHN) | KO
Dara Shen (TPE) | 0
Pooja Rani (IND) | 3

Semifinals
Marina Volnova (KAZ) | 0
Jang Un-hui (PRK) | 3
Li Qian (CHN) | 2
Pooja Rani (IND) | 0

Final
Jang Un-hui (PRK) | 2
Li Qian (CHN) | 1
