= 2026 European Boxing Championships – Men's 85 kg =

Men's 85 kg at the 2026 European Boxing Championships
- Venue: Asics Arena
- Location: Sofia, Bulgaria
- Dates: 17–24 September
- Competitors: 19 from 19 nations

Medalists
gold medal	Dmitrii Karmanov	Russia
silver medal	Junior Tadah	France
bronze medal	Michael Derouiche	Austria
bronze medal	Antonio Grabić	Croatia

The men's 85 kg competition at the 2026 European Boxing Championships was held from 17 to 24 September 2026.

== Results ==
=== Final ===
Final; 24 September
(France) Junior Tadah	0
(Russia) Dmitrii Karmanov	5

=== Top half ===
Round of 32; 17 September
(Belarus) Aliaksei Koktsikau	1
(Ukraine) Matvii Razhba	3

Round of 16; 18 September
(Austria) Michael Derouiche	3
(Ukraine) Matvii Razhba	2
(Estonia) Leon Kermas	1
(Moldova) Andrei Chiriacov	4
(Germany) Valerij Walter	4
(Armenia) Rafayel Hovhannisyan	1
(Hungary) Pál Kovács
(France) Junior Tadah	RSC

Quarterfinals; 21 September
(Austria) Michael Derouiche	5
(Moldova) Andrei Chiriacov	0
(Germany) Valerij Walter	2
(France) Junior Tadah	3

Semifinals; 23 September
(Austria) Michael Derouiche	1
(France) Junior Tadah	4

=== Bottom half ===
Round of 32; 17 September
(Italy) Marvin Ghilarducci	5
(Israel) Jonatan Barashi	0
(Belgium) Idris Leganase	1
(Azerbaijan) Seyid Seyidov	4

Round of 16; 18 September
(Bulgaria) Semion Boldirev
(Italy) Marvin Ghilarducci	w/o
(Croatia) Antonio Grabić	5
(Czech Republic) Daniel Komárek	0
(Poland) Igor Rondoś	0
(Russia) Dmitrii Karmanov	5
(Azerbaijan) Seyid Seyidov	0
(Spain) Adrián Fresneda	5

Quarterfinals; 21 September
(Italy) Marvin Ghilarducci	2
(Croatia) Antonio Grabić	3
(Russia) Dmitrii Karmanov	5
(Spain) Adrián Fresneda	0

Semifinals; 23 September
(Croatia) Antonio Grabić	0
(Russia) Dmitrii Karmanov	5
