= Chris Okoh (boxer) =

English boxer

Personal information
- Nationality: British
- Born: Chris Okoh; 18 April 1969 (age 57) Carshalton, London, England
- Height: 6 ft 2 in (1.88 m)
- Weight: Cruiserweight
- Children: Isaac

Boxing career

Boxing record
- Total fights: 16
- Wins: 14
- Win by KO: 8
- Losses: 2
- Draws: 0
- No contests: 0

Chris Okoh (born 8 April 1969) is a British former cruiserweight boxer.

== Biography ==
=== Background ===
Okoh was born in Croydon, to Gloria Okoh. His father died whilst he was still a child.

=== Boxing career ===
Okoh's professional boxing record stands at 14 wins, seven by way of knock-out and two losses in 16 bouts. He is the former BBBofC Southern Area and Commonwealth title holder at cruiserweight.

=== After boxing ===
Okoh studied to work with rehabilitating offenders and probation in 2002. He is also a trainer at Chadwell St Mary Amateur Boxing Club in Chadwell St Mary, Thurrock, Essex.

== Personal life ==
Born in England, Okoh is of Nigerian descent. His son Isaac Okoh was also a professional boxer.

== Professional boxing record ==
| 17 fights | 14 wins | 2 losses |
|---|---|---|
| By knockout | 8 | 1 |
| By decision | 6 | 1 |
| Draws | 1 | |

| No. | Result | Record | Opponent | Type | Round, time | Date | Location | Notes |
|---|---|---|---|---|---|---|---|---|
| 16 | Loss | 14–2 | (United Kingdom) Kenny Gayle | PTS | 6 | 1999-10-31 | (United Kingdom) David Lloyd Tennis Centre, Raynes Park, London, England | |
| 15 | Loss | 14–1 | (United Kingdom) Darren Corbett | KO | 3 (12), 1:23 | 1997-06-02 | (United Kingdom) Ulster Hall, Belfast, Northern Ireland | Lost Commonwealth (British Empire) Cruiserweight title. |
| 14 | Win | 14–0 | (United Kingdom) Denzil Browne | PTS | 12 | 1997-03-25 | (United Kingdom) Lewisham Theatre, Lewisham, England | Retained Commonwealth (British Empire) Cruiserweight title. |
| 13 | Win | 13–0 | (Australia) Tosca Petridis | PTS | 12 | 1996-11-06 | (United Kingdom) Ice Arena, Kingston upon Hull, England | Won Commonwealth (British Empire) Cruiserweight title. |
| 12 | Win | 12–0 | (United Kingdom) Nigel Rafferty | TKO | 4 (8), 0:57 | 1996-08-27 | (United Kingdom) Blazers Night Club, Windsor, Berkshire, England | |
| 11 | Win | 11–0 | (United Kingdom) George Carmen | TKO | 6 (12), 0:40 | 1996-04-22 | (United Kingdom) National Sports Centre, Crystal Palace, London, England | Won vacan WBO Inter-continental Cruiserweight title. |
| 10 | Win | 10–0 | (United Kingdom) Darren Westover | KO | 2 (12), 2:48 | 1996-02-05 | (United Kingdom) Crook Log Sports Club, Bexleyheath, England | Won vacant WBO Inter-continental Cruiserweight title. |
| 9 | Win | 9–0 | (United Kingdom) Paul Lawson | TKO | 1 (12), 2:22 | 1995-11-08 | (United Kingdom) York Hall, Bethnal Green, London, England | Retained Commonwealth (British Empire) Cruiserweight title. |
| 8 | Win | 8–0 | (Uganda) Franco Wanyama | TKO | 8 (12) | 1995-09-29 | (United Kingdom) York Hall, Bethnal Green, London, England | Won vacant Commonwealth (British Empire) Cruiserweight title. |
| 7 | Win | 7–0 | (United Kingdom) Paul Lawson | TKO | 5 (10), 1:55 | 1995-02-23 | (United Kingdom) Elephant & Castle Centre, Southwark, London, England | Won vacant BBBofC Southern Area Cruiserweight title. |
| 6 | Win | 6–0 | (United Kingdom) Art Stacey | PTS | 6 | 1994-09-17 | (United Kingdom) Leisure Centre, Crawley, England | |
| 5 | Win | 5–0 | (United Kingdom) Art Stacey | PTS | 6 | 1994-04-09 | (United Kingdom) York Hall, Bethnal Green, London, England | |
| 4 | Win | 4–0 | (United Kingdom) Chris Henry | TKO | 2 (6) | 1993-11-06 | (United Kingdom) York Hall, Bethnal Green, London, England | |
| 3 | Win | 3–0 | (United Kingdom) Steve Osborne | TKO | 5 (6) | 1993-09-28 | (United Kingdom) York Hall, Bethnal Green, London, England | |
| 2 | Win | 2–0 | (United Kingdom) Steve Yorath | PTS | 6 | 1993-07-10 | (United Kingdom) Wales National Ice Rink, Cardiff, Wales | |
| 1 | Win | 1–0 | (United Kingdom) Lee Prudden | PTS | 6 | 1993-03-16 | (United Kingdom) Grosvenor House Hotel, Mayfair, London, England | Professional debut |
