= Teagn Stott =

English boxer (born 2003)

Personal information
- Born: 9 September 2003 (age 23)
- Height: 6 ft 3 in (191 cm)

Sport
- Sport: Boxing
- Weight class: Cruiserweight
- Club: Sheffield Boxing Centre
Medal record
Men's amateur boxing
Representing England
World Boxing Championships
Silver medal – second place	2025 Liverpool	85 kg
European U23 Boxing Championships
Gold medal – first place	2024 Sofia	86 kg

Teagn Stott (born 9 September 2003) is an English amateur boxer. He won a silver medal in the 85 kg category at the 2025 World Boxing Championships. Stott also won the gold medal in the 86 kg division at the 2024 European Under-23 Boxing Championships.

== Career ==
Having had his first bout in 2019, Stott won the under 86 kg title at the 2024 England Boxing Elite Championships, defeating Dominic Owoo in the final at Derby Arena.

Representing England, he won the gold medal in the 86 kg final division at the 2024 European Under-23 Boxing Championships in Sofia, Bulgaria, with a unanimous decision success over Ukraine's Ashot Kocharian in the final.

A member of the GB Boxing World Class Programme, Stott was chosen to be England's entrant in the 85 kg category at the 2025 World Boxing Championships in Liverpool. In his opening bout, which took place on his 22nd birthday, he beat Daniel Komárek of Czechia via 4:1 split decision. Stott then stopped Bulgaria's Semion Boldirev in the second round of their quarter-final contest, before defeating Danylo Zhasan from Ukraine by 4:1 split decision in the semi-finals. He lost in the final to Uzbekistan's Akmaljon Isroilov via unanimous decision and was therefore awarded a silver medal.
