= 2025 IBA Women's World Boxing Championships =

Boxing tournament in Serbia

- Venue: Čair Sports Center
- Location: Niš, Serbia
- Dates: 9–16 March
- Competitors: 239 from 50 nations

The 2025 IBA Women's World Boxing Championships were the 14th edition of the championships, held in Niš, Serbia from 9 to 16 March 2025. It was planned to be held in Astana, Kazakhstan, in 2024 but later postponed and moved.

== Schedule ==
All times are local (UTC+1).

Date Event	Sun 9	Mon 10		Tue 11		Wed 12		Thu 13		Fri 14		Sat 15	Sun 16
Date Event	18:00	14:00	18:00	14:00	18:00	14:00	18:00	14:00	18:00	14:00	18:00		17:00
Minimumweight		R32				R16			QF	SF			F
Light flyweight	R32			R16				QF		SF			F
Flyweight			R32				R16		QF	SF			F
Bantamweight		R32			R16			QF		SF			F
Featherweight			R32			R16			QF	SF			F
Lightweight	R32			R16				QF		SF			F
Light welterweight		R32		R16					QF	SF			F
Welterweight					R16			QF		SF			F
Light middleweight			R32				R16		QF	SF			F
Middleweight						R16		QF		SF			F
Light heavyweight					R16				QF	SF			F
Heavyweight	R16							QF		SF			F

== Medal summary ==
=== Medal table ===
* Host nation (Serbia)

Rank	Nation	Gold	Silver	Bronze	Total
1	Russia	4	1	2	7
2	Kazakhstan	3	2	1	6
3	Turkey	1	3	2	6
4	China	1	1	3	5
5	Serbia*	1	0	5	6
6	North Korea	1	0	2	3
7	Morocco	1	0	1	2
8	Thailand	0	2	1	3
9	Ireland	0	2	0	2
10	Uzbekistan	0	1	3	4
11	Belarus	0	0	1	1
11	Moldova	0	0	1	1
11	Slovakia	0	0	1	1
11	Vietnam	0	0	1	1
Totals (14 entries)		12	12	24	48

=== Medal events ===
Event	Gold	Silver	Bronze
Minimumweight	Nazym Kyzaibay; Kazakhstan	Iuliia Chumgalakova; Russia	Hong Kyong-ryong; North Korea
Minimumweight	Nazym Kyzaibay; Kazakhstan	Iuliia Chumgalakova; Russia	Farzona Fozilova; Uzbekistan
Light flyweight	Alua Balkibekova; Kazakhstan	Hu Meiyi; China	An Kum-byol; North Korea
Light flyweight	Alua Balkibekova; Kazakhstan	Hu Meiyi; China	Sabina Bobokulova; Uzbekistan
Flyweight	Pang Chol-mi; North Korea	Buse Naz Çakıroğlu; Turkey	Feruza Kazakova; Uzbekistan
Flyweight	Pang Chol-mi; North Korea	Buse Naz Çakıroğlu; Turkey	Dragana Jovanović; Serbia
Bantamweight	Widad Bertal; Morocco	Hatice Akbaş; Turkey	Sara Ćirković; Serbia
Bantamweight	Widad Bertal; Morocco	Hatice Akbaş; Turkey	Natnicha Chongprongklang; Thailand
Featherweight	Anđela Branković; Serbia	Punrawee Ruenros; Thailand	Esra Yıldız; Turkey
Featherweight	Anđela Branković; Serbia	Punrawee Ruenros; Thailand	Cai Yan; China
Lightweight	Nune Asatryan; Russia	Viktoriya Grafeyeva; Kazakhstan	Miroslava Jedináková; Slovakia
Lightweight	Nune Asatryan; Russia	Viktoriya Grafeyeva; Kazakhstan	Natalia Shadrina; Serbia
Light welterweight	Aida Abikeyeva; Kazakhstan	Thananya Somnuek; Thailand	Elena Babicheva; Russia
Light welterweight	Aida Abikeyeva; Kazakhstan	Thananya Somnuek; Thailand	Hà Thị Linh; Vietnam
Welterweight	Busenaz Sürmeneli; Turkey	Navbakhor Khamidova; Uzbekistan	Anastasija Lukajić; Serbia
Welterweight	Busenaz Sürmeneli; Turkey	Navbakhor Khamidova; Uzbekistan	Albina Moldazhanova; Russia
Light middleweight	Elena Gapeshina; Russia	Lisa O'Rourke; Ireland	Aryna Danilchyk; Belarus
Light middleweight	Elena Gapeshina; Russia	Lisa O'Rourke; Ireland	Natalya Bogdanova; Kazakhstan
Middleweight	Anastasiia Shamonova; Russia	Aoife O'Rourke; Ireland	Wang Lina; China
Middleweight	Anastasiia Shamonova; Russia	Aoife O'Rourke; Ireland	Nikolina Gajić; Serbia
Light heavyweight	Saltanat Medenova; Russia	Büşra Işıldar; Turkey	Hasna Larti; Morocco
Light heavyweight	Saltanat Medenova; Russia	Büşra Işıldar; Turkey	Wang Xiaomeng; China
Heavyweight	Zhan Yilian; China	Yeldana Talipova; Kazakhstan	Elif Güneri; Turkey
Heavyweight	Zhan Yilian; China	Yeldana Talipova; Kazakhstan	Daria Sazonova; Moldova

== Participating nations ==
239 boxer from 50 countries are participating.

1. Afghanistan (3)
2. Armenia (4)
3. Australia (1)
4. Azerbaijan (6)
5. Belarus (6)
6. Brazil (1)
7. Bulgaria (4)
8. China (12)
9. Cape Verde (1)
10. Colombia (2)
11. Cuba (3)
12. Ethiopia (3)
13. Fair Chance Team (1)
14. French Polynesia (2)
15. Georgia (2)
16. Germany (2)
17. Greece (5)
18. Haiti (1)
19. Mongolia (3)
20. Netherlands (1)
21. Nigeria (1)
22. Ireland (8)
23. Kazakhstan (12)
24. Kenya (8)
25. Kyrgyzstan (3)
26. Latvia (2)
27. Mexico (8)
28. Moldova (3)
29. Montenegro (1)
30. Morocco (7)
31. North Macedonia (1)
32. Portugal (1)
33. North Korea (6)
34. Puerto Rico (3)
35. Romania (10)
36. Russia (12)
37. Serbia (12) (Host)
38. Sierra Leone (3)
39. Slovakia (4)
40. South Africa (8)
41. Spain (6)
42. Sweden (1)
43. Tajikistan (3)
44. Tanzania (5)
45. Thailand (4)
46. Tunisia (1)
47. Turkey (12)
48. Uzbekistan (12)
49. Venezuela (8)
50. Vietnam (8)
51. Zimbabwe (3)
