= Danylo Zhasan =

Ukrainian boxer

Personal information
- Nationality: Ukraine
- Born: 4 March 1998 (age 28)

Boxing career
Medal record
Men's amateur boxing
Representing Ukraine
World Championships
Bronze medal – third place	2025 Liverpool	85 kg

Danylo Oleksandrovych Zhasan (Данило Олександрович Жасан, born 4 March 1998) is a Ukrainian boxer. He competed at the 2025 World Boxing Championships, winning the bronze medal in the men's 85 kg event.
