= 2025 IBA Women's World Boxing Championships – Light welterweight =

Light welterweight at the 2025 IBA Women's World Boxing Championships
- Venue: Sportski centar Čair
- Location: Niš, Serbia
- Dates: 10–14 March (preliminaries/semifinals); 16 March (final)
- Competitors: 23 from 23 nations

Medalists
gold medal	Aida Abikeyeva	Kazakhstan
silver medal	Thananya Somnuek	Thailand
bronze medal	Hà Thị Linh	Vietnam
bronze medal	Elena Babicheva	Russia

The Light welterweight competition at the 2025 IBA Women's World Boxing Championships was held from 10 to 16 March 2025.

== Results ==
=== Finals ===
Semi-finals
(Thailand) Thananya Somnuek	5
(Vietnam) Hà Thị Linh	0
(Russia) Elena Babicheva	0
(Kazakhstan) Aida Abikeyeva	5

Final
(Thailand) Thananya Somnuek	0
(Kazakhstan) Aida Abikeyeva	5

=== Top half ===
==== Section 1 ====
Round of 32
(Zimbabwe) Hildah Kaye
(Serbia) Kristina Kulukhova	RSC

Round of 16
(Thailand) Thananya Somnuek	5
(Serbia) Kristina Kulukhova	2
(Kenya) Cynthia Mwai
(Mexico) Milagros Hernández	RSC

Quarterfinals
(Thailand) Thananya Somnuek	RSC
(Mexico) Milagros Hernández

==== Section 2 ====
Round of 32
(Greece) Olga Papadatou	0
(Venezuela) Omailyn Alcalá	4
(Tajikistan) Nilufar Boboyorova	0
(Latvia) Jekaterina Sorokina	5

Round of 16
(Vietnam) Hà Thị Linh	4
(Venezuela) Omailyn Alcalá	1
(Latvia) Jekaterina Sorokina	RSC
(Armenia) Sona Harutyunyan

Quarterfinals
(Vietnam) Hà Thị Linh	4
(Latvia) Jekaterina Sorokina	1

=== Bottom half ===
==== Section 3 ====
Round of 32
(Sierra Leone) Rebecca Sovula
(Romania) Loredana Marin	w/o
(Netherlands) Megan de Cler	w/o
(Tanzania) Doricas Kibwana

Round of 16
(Russia) Elena Babicheva	5
(Romania) Loredana Marin	0
(Netherlands) Megan de Cler	5
(Uzbekistan) Odinakhon Ismoilova	0

Quarterfinals
(Russia) Elena Babicheva	RSC-I
(Netherlands) Megan de Cler

==== Section 4 ====
Round of 32
(Belarus) Alla Ivashkevich	3
(Turkey) Esmanur Lök	4
(China) Zhao Shuoyu	4
(Slovakia) Jessica Triebeľová	3

Round of 16
(Spain) Mariana Soto
(Turkey) Esmanur Lök	RSC
(China) Zhao Shuoyu	0
(Kazakhstan) Aida Abikeyeva	5

Quarterfinals
(Turkey) Esmanur Lök	0
(Kazakhstan) Aida Abikeyeva	5
