= 2025 World Boxing Championships – Women's 65 kg =

Competition at amateur boxing tournament

Women's 65 kg at the 2025 World Boxing Championships
- Venue: Liverpool Arena
- Location: Liverpool, England
- Dates: 5–14 September
- Competitors: 28 from 28 nations

Medalists
gold medal	Aida Abikeyeva	Kazakhstan
silver medal	Navbakhor Khamidova	Uzbekistan
bronze medal	Gráinne Walsh	Ireland
bronze medal	Chen Nien-chin	Chinese Taipei

The Women's 65 kg competition at the 2025 World Boxing Championships was held from 5 to 14 September 2025.

== Results ==
=== Final ===
Final; 14 September
Aida Abikeyeva (KAZ)	3
Navbakhor Khamidova (UZB)	0

=== Top half ===
Preliminaries; 5 September
Marissa Williamson (AUS)	5
Esmeralda Novruzaj (ALB)	0
Gráinne Walsh (IRL)	5
Jessica Triebeľová (SVK)	0
Mariana Soto (ESP)	5
Nataliia Merinova (UKR)	0
Kang Su-kyoung (KOR)	3
Beatriz Soares (BRA)	2
Aida Abikeyeva (KAZ)	5
Luca Hámori (HUN)	0
Angie Valdés (COL)	5
Genesis Palma (VEN)	0

Round of 16; 8 September
Yang Liu (CHN)	5
Marissa Williamson (AUS)	0
Gráinne Walsh (IRL)	5
Mariana Soto (ESP)	0
Kang Su-kyoung (KOR)	0
Aida Abikeyeva (KAZ)	5
Angie Valdés (COL)	1
Busenaz Sürmeneli (TUR)	4

Quarter-finals; 10 September
Yang Liu (CHN)	2
Gráinne Walsh (IRL)	3
Aida Abikeyeva (KAZ)	5
Busenaz Sürmeneli (TUR)	0

Semi-finals; 12 September
Gráinne Walsh (IRL)	0
Aida Abikeyeva (KAZ)	5

=== Bottom half ===
Preliminaries; 5 September
Oshin Derieuw (BEL)	5
Ichrak Chaib (ALG)	0
Krista Kovalainen (FIN)	2
Neeraj Phogat (IND)	3
Morelle McCane (USA)	1
Sacha Hickey (ENG)	4
Caitlin Rainey (SCO)	4
Madeleine Angelsen (NOR)	1
Jordan Wilson (NZL)
Kinga Krowka (POL)	RSC
Almendra Gonzalez (MEX)	0
Anna Jenni (SUI)	5

Round of 16; 8 September
Navbakhor Khamidova (UZB)	4
Oshin Derieuw (BEL)	1
Neeraj Phogat (IND)	2
Sacha Hickey (ENG)	3
Caitlin Rainey (SCO)	0
Kinga Krowka (POL)	5
Anna Jenni (SUI)	0
Chen Nien-chin (TPE)	5

Quarter-finals; 10 September
Navbakhor Khamidova (UZB)	4
Sacha Hickey (ENG)	1
Kinga Krowka (POL)	1
Chen Nien-chin (TPE)	4

Semi-finals; 12 September
Navbakhor Khamidova (UZB)	3
Chen Nien-chin (TPE)	2
