= Boxing at the 2026 Commonwealth Games – Men's 90 kg =

Boxing competitions

Boxing – Men's 90 kg at the 2026 Commonwealth Games
- Venue: SEC Centre
- Dates: July 26 – 1 August 2026
- Competitors: 9 from 9 nations

Medalists
| gold medal | Isaac Okoh | England |
| silver medal | Connor Williams | Wales |
| bronze medal | Garyn McAllister | Northern Ireland |
| bronze medal | Robert McNulty | Scotland |

The men's 90 kg boxing competitions at the 2026 Commonwealth Games in Glasgow, Scotland took place between July 26 and August 1 at the SEC Centre.

Like all Commonwealth boxing events, the competition was a straight single-elimination tournament. Both semifinal losers were awarded bronze medals, so no boxers competed again after their first loss. Bouts consisted of three rounds of three minutes each, with one-minute breaks between rounds.

== Schedule ==
The schedule was as follows:

| Date | Round |
|---|---|
| Sunday 26 July | Round of 16 |
| Wednesday 29 July | Quarter-finals |
| Friday 31 July | Semi-finals |
| Saturday 1 August | Final |

== Results ==
The draw was as follows:

=== Bracket ===
Round of 16
26 July
Connor Williams (WAL) | RSC
Petrus Kotze (NAM)

Quarterfinals
28 July
Duken Holo Tutakitoa-Williams (NIU) | 1
Connor Williams (WAL) | 4
28 July
Jibril Muntari (GHA) | 0
Garyn McAllister (NIR) | 5
28 July
Isaac Okoh (ENG) | 5
Lachlan Lawson (AUS) | 0
28 July
Kapil Pokhariya (IND) | 0
Robert McNulty (SCO) | 5

Semifinal
31 July
Connor Williams (WAL) | 5
Garyn McAllister (NIR) | 0
31 July
Isaac Okoh (ENG) | 5
Robert McNulty (SCO) | 0

Gold medal match
1 August
Connor Williams (WAL) | 0
Isaac Okoh (ENG) | 5
