= Garyn McAllister =

Northern Irish boxer

Personal information
- Nationality: Northern Ireland
- Born: 21 December 2004 (age 21)

Boxing career
Medal record
Men's amateur boxing
Representing Northern Ireland
Commonwealth Games
Bronze medal – third place	2026 Glasgow	90 kg

Garyn McAllister (born 21 December 2004) is a Northern Irish boxer. He competed at the 2026 Commonwealth Games, winning the bronze medal in the men's 90 kg event.
