= Şeyma Düztaş =

Turkish boxer (born 2002)

Personal information
- Nationality: Turkish
- Born: 10 April 2002 (age 24) Van, Turkey

Boxing career
- Weight class: Heavyweight (+81 kg)

Boxing record
- Win by KO: 3
- Losses: 4
- Draws: 0
Medal record
Women's amateur boxing
Representing Turkey
World Championships
Bronze medal – third place	2025 Liverpool	+80 kg
European Amateur Championships
Silver medal – second place	2024 Sofia	+81 kg U23
EUBC U22 European Championships
Bronze medal – third place	2023 Budva	+81 kg U22

Şeyma Düztaş (born 10 April 2002) is a Turkish female boxer who competes in the heavyweight (+80 kg) division.

== Personal life ==
Şeyma Düztaş was born in Van, eastern Turkey on 10 April 2002. She has a three years younger sister, Yaren Düztaş.

== Boxing career ==
Düztaş started her boxing career at age 17 encouraged by the national team coach Ayhan Öz. She is a member of Fenerbahçe Boxing. She trains with her sister Yaren, also a national boxer who competes in the light middleweight (70 kg) division.

She took the bronze medal in the heavyweight (+81 kg) division at the EUBC U22 M&W European Boxing Championships held in Budva, Montenegro in 2023. She won the silver medal at the 2024 European U23 Boxing Championships in Sofia, Bulgaria. At the 2025 World Boxing Championships in Liverpool, England, she became bronze medalist in the +80 kg event.
