= 2025 IBA Women's World Boxing Championships – Heavyweight =

Heavyweight at the 2025 IBA Women's World Boxing Championships
- Venue: Sportski centar Čair
- Location: Niš, Serbia
- Dates: 9–14 March (preliminaries/semifinals); 16 March (final)
- Competitors: 11 from 11 nations

Medalists
gold medal	Zhan Yilian	China
silver medal	Yeldana Talipova	Kazakhstan
bronze medal	Elif Güneri	Turkey
bronze medal	Daria Sazonova	Moldova

The Heavyweight competition at the 2025 IBA Women's World Boxing Championships was held from 9 to 16 March 2025.

== Results ==
Round of 16
(Turkey) Elif Güneri	5
(Republic of Ireland) Judy Bobbett	0
(Uzbekistan) Oltinoy Sotimboeva	1
(Kazakhstan) Yeldana Talipova	4
(Tanzania) Rachel Msengi
(French Polynesia) Zamora Nena	w/o

Quarter-finals
(Azerbaijan) Aynur Rzayeva	1
(Turkey) Elif Güneri	4
(Russia) Mariia Kuchmanova	2
(China) Zhan Yilian	5
(Serbia) Sara Miljković	2
(Kazakhstan) Yeldana Talipova	5
(French Polynesia) Zamora Nena
(Moldova) Daria Sazonova	RSC

Semi-finals
(Turkey) Elif Güneri	0
(China) Zhan Yilian	5
(Kazakhstan) Yeldana Talipova	5
(Moldova) Daria Sazonova	0

Final
(China) Zhan Yilian	4
(Kazakhstan) Yeldana Talipova	1
