= Aibek Oralbay =

Kazakh boxer (born 2000)

Aibek Oralbay Айбек Оралбай
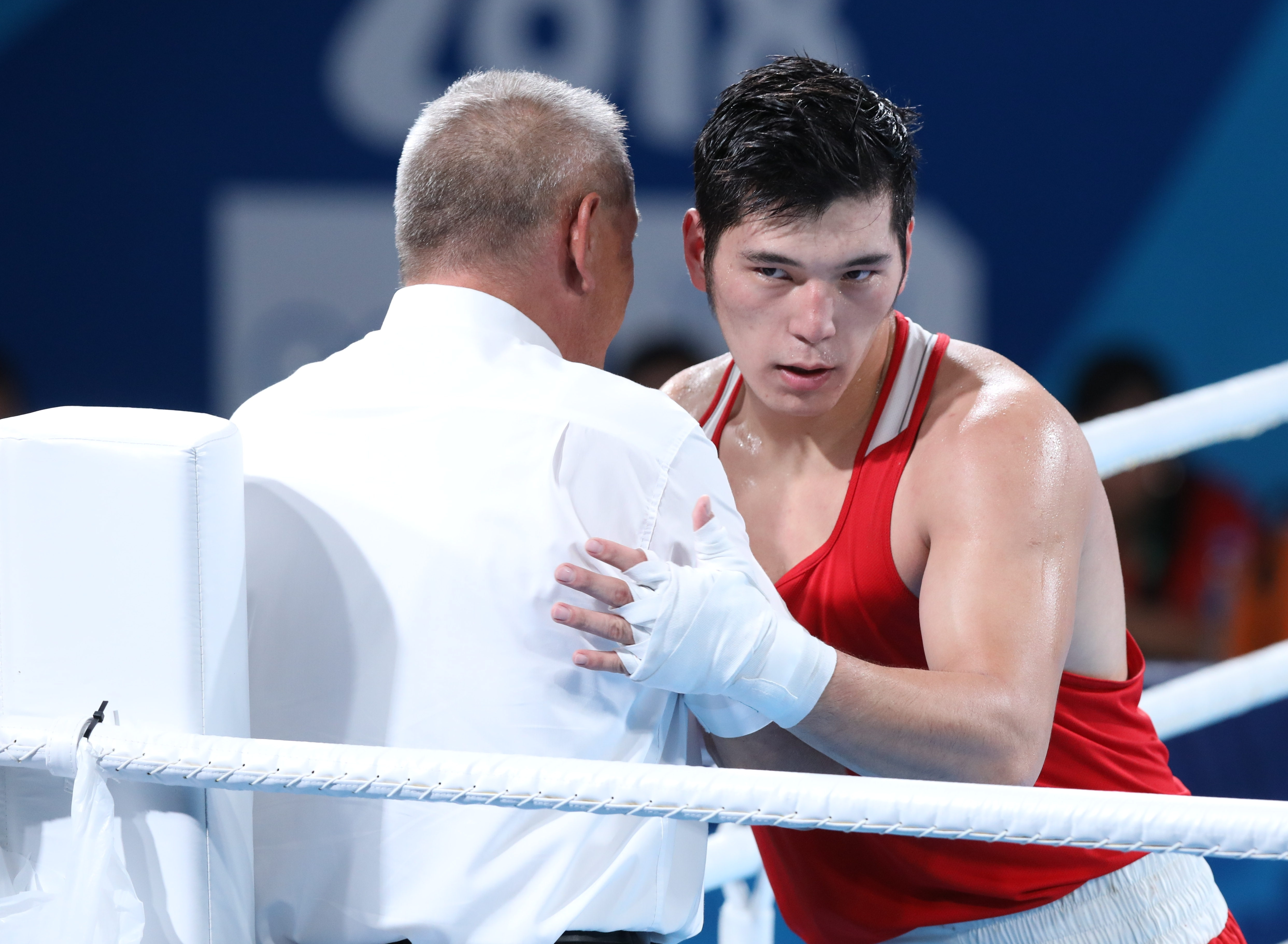
- Oralbay at the 2018 Youth Olympics

Personal information
- Nationality: Kazakh
- Born: 11 June 2000 (age 26) Astana, Kazakhstan
- Height: 1.88 m (6 ft 2 in)
- Weight: Heavyweight

Boxing career
- Stance: Orthodox stance
Medal record
Men's amateur boxing
Representing Kazakhstan
World Championships
Gold medal – first place	2025 Liverpool	Super heavyweight
Asian Championships
Gold medal – first place	2022 Amman	Heavyweight
Gold medal – first place	2024 Chiang Mai	Super heavyweight
Asian Games
Gold medal – first place	2026 Aichi–Nagoya	+90 kg
Youth Olympic Games
Gold medal – first place	2018 Buenos Aires	Heavyweight
Youth World Championships
Silver medal – second place	2018 Budapest	Heavyweight

Aibek Oralbay Rahatuly (Kazakh: Айбек Оралбай Рахатұлы, Aybek Oralbay Rahatulı; born 11 June 2000) is a Kazakh amateur boxer. While representing Kazakhstan in the heavyweight division, he won a gold medal at the 2018 Youth Olympics and silver at the 2018 Youth World Championships. He has been selected by Kazakhstan for the 2024 Summer Olympics. He competed in the men's 92 kg event at the 2024 Olympics.

He is the twin brother of fellow boxer Nurbek Oralbay.
