= Eseta Flint =

Australian boxer (born 1996)

Personal information
- Nationality: Australian
- Born: 29 February 1996 (age 30)

Boxing career
Medal record
Women's amateur boxing
Representing Australia
World Championships
| Gold medal – first place | 2025 Liverpool | 80 kg |
Representing Tonga
Pacific Games
| Bronze medal – third place | 2023 Honiara | 75 kg |

Eseta Natasha Flint (born 29 February 1996) is an Australian boxer. She won a gold medal in the 80 kg division at the 2025 World Boxing Championships.

== Early life ==
Flint was born on 29 February 1996.

== Amateur career ==
Flint competed in the 80 kg category of the 2025 World Boxing Championships held in Liverpool, England. She defeated Gulsaya Yerzhan in the quarterfinals and Viktoria Penney in the semifinals. In the gold medal match, she defeated Emily Asquith by unanimous decision.
