= Boxing at the 2026 Commonwealth Games – Women's 65 kg =

Boxing competitions

Boxing – Women's 65 kg at the 2026 Commonwealth Games
- Venue: SEC Centre
- Dates: 28 July – 1 August 2026
- Competitors: 8 from 8 nations

Medalists
gold medal	Sacha Hickey	England
silver medal	Kaci Rock	Northern Ireland
bronze medal	Caitlin Rainey	Scotland
bronze medal	Eve Bryson	Australia

The women's 65 kg boxing competitions at the 2026 Commonwealth Games in Glasgow, Scotland took place between July 28 and August 1 at the SEC Centre.

Like all Commonwealth boxing events, the competition was a straight single-elimination tournament. Both semifinal losers were awarded bronze medals, so no boxers competed again after their first loss. Bouts consisted of three rounds of three minutes each, with one-minute breaks between rounds.

== Schedule ==
The schedule was as follows:

Date	Round
Tuesday 28 July	Quarter-finals
Friday 31 July	Semi-finals
Saturday 1 August	Final

== Results ==
The draw was as follows:

=== Bracket ===
Quarterfinals
28 July
Kaci Rock (NIR)	5
Karen Te Ruki Pasene (NIU)	0
28 July
Flora Loga (PNG)
Caitlin Rainey (SCO)	RSC
28 July
Sacha Hickey (ENG)	3
Parveen Hooda (IND)	2
28 July
Eve Bryson (AUS)	4
Emily Nakalema (UGA)	1

Semifinal
31 July
Kaci Rock (NIR)	3
Caitlin Rainey (SCO)	2
31 July
Sacha Hickey (ENG)	5
Eve Bryson (AUS)	0

Gold medal match
1 August
Kaci Rock (NIR)	0
Sacha Hickey (ENG)	5
