= Sacha Hickey =

English boxer (born 2003)

Personal information
- Nationality: (England) English
- Born: 7 November 2003 (age 22)

Sport
- Sport: Boxing
- Weight class: Light-welterweight, Welterweight
- Club: Fisher ABC
Medal record
Women's amateur boxing
Representing England
Commonwealth Games
| Gold medal – first place | 2026 Glasgow | 65 kg |
European U23 Boxing Championships
| Gold medal – first place | 2024 Sofia | Light-welterweight |

Sacha Hickey (born 7 November 2003) is an English boxer. She won gold medals at the 2026 Commonwealth Games and the 2024 European Under-23 Championships.

== Career ==
Hickey won the gold medal in the light-welterweight division at the 2024 European Under-23 Boxing Championships. She also came first in the light-welterweight category at the 2025 Strandja Memorial tournament and the welterweight division at part one of the 2025 World Boxing Cup.

She was chosen to represent England at the 2025 World Boxing Championships in Liverpool, where she lost in the quarter-finals.

Hickey was selected to represent England at the 2026 Commonwealth Games in Glasgow, where she won the gold medal in the 65 kg division, defeating Kaci Rock of Northern Ireland in the final.
