= Gráinne Walsh =

Irish boxer (born 1995)

Personal information
- Nationality: Irish
- Born: Gráinne Mary Walsh; 13 October 1995 (age 31) Republic of Ireland
- Height: 1.70 m (5 ft 7 in)
- Weight: Welterweight

Boxing career
- Stance: Orthodox
Medal record
Women's amateur boxing
Representing Ireland
World Championships
Bronze medal – third place	2025 Liverpool	65 kg
European Games
Bronze medal – third place	2019 Minsk	Welterweight
EU Championships
Bronze medal – third place	2017 Cascia	Welterweight

Gráinne Mary Walsh (born 13 October 1995) is an Irish boxer. She won a bronze medal at the 2025 World Boxing Championships and competed at the 2024 Summer Olympics.

== Early life ==
Walsh is a native of Tullamore. She was a talented soccer player with Shamrock Rovers Ladies F.C. and studied at NUI Galway.

== Career ==
Walsh boxes at Spartacus Boxing Club in Tullamore. She won bronze at the 2019 European Games in Minsk.

Having made it through to the 2024 Summer Olympics via the final qualification tournament in Thailand, Walsh lost in the first round at the Games in Paris to Anna Hamori from Hungary by 3:2 split decision, despite her opponent having a point deducted for holding.

Walsh won a bronze medal in the 65 kg division at the 2025 World Boxing Championships in Liverpool, losing in the semi-finals to Kazakhstan's eventual gold medalist Aida Abikeyeva by unanimous decision.
