= Thananya Somnuek =

Thai boxer

Personal information
- Nickname: Noey
- Nationality: Thai
- Born: 31 May 2001 (age 25)
- Height: 1.65 m (5 ft 5 in)

Boxing career
Medal record
Women's amateur boxing
Representing Thailand
World Championships
Silver medal – second place	2025 Niš	Light welterweight
Asian Games
Bronze medal – third place	2022 Hangzhou	Lightweight
Asian Championships
Bronze medal – third place	2024 Chiang Mai	Light welterweight

Thananya Somnuek (Thai: ธนัญญา สมนึก) is a Thai boxer. She won the bronze medal in the 2022 Asian Games.

In the 2024 Summer Olympics, she competed in the women's 60 kg event (lightweight), she was eliminated in the first round (round of 32) when she lost to Donjeta Sadiku from the Kosovo 2–3.
