= Nimriwali =

- Interactive map of Nimriwali
- Coordinates: 28°42′59″N 76°08′26″E

Population
  - Total: 2,945

Nimriwali or Neemriwali is a village in Bhiwani district of the Indian state of Haryana. It lies approximately 9 km south of the district headquarters town of Bhiwani. It's 265 km from State capital Chandigarh and 120 km from Rajdhani Delhi.

== Demographics ==
Neemriwali has 542 families residing there. The Nimriwali village has population of 2,945 of which 1563 are males while 1382 are females as per Population Census 2011. In Neemriwali children age 0-6 is 375 make up 12.73% of the population. The sex ratio is 884, higher than Haryana state average of 879. child sex ratio is 838— higher than Haryana average of 834. For political representational purposes the village is part of Bhiwani Assembly constituency and the Bhiwani-Mahendragarh Lok Sabha constituency.

== Economy ==
A husyant furniture works and Gill shopping mart are famous in Haryana.

== Education ==
Neemriwali village has lower literacy rate than the Haryana average. In 2011, the literacy rate was 73.42% compared to 75.55% of Haryana. In Nimriwali Male literacy stands at 86.83% while female literacy rate was 58.38 %.

== Governance ==
Nimriwali village is administered by the elected Sarpanch (Head of Village).
