= Michael Derouiche =

Austrian boxer (born 2002)

Personal information
- Nationality: Austria
- Born: November 6, 2002 (age 23)

Boxing career
Medal record
Men's amateur boxing
Representing Austria
World Championships
Bronze medal – third place	2025 Liverpool	85 kg
European Boxing Championships
Bronze medal – third place	2026 Sofia	85 kg

Michael Fares Derouiche (born 6 November 2002 in Vienna) is an Austrian boxer. He competed at the 2025 World Boxing Championships, winning the bronze medal in the men's 85 kg event. At the 2026 European Championships, Derouiche won a bronze medal in the men's 85 kg.
