= Antonio Grabić =

Croatian boxer

Personal information
- Nationality: Croatia

Boxing career
Medal record
Men's amateur boxing
Representing Croatia
EB European Championships
Bronze medal – third place	2026 Sofia	85 kg

Antonio Grabić is a Croatian boxer. He competed at the 2026 European Amateur Boxing Championships, winning the bronze medal in the men's 85 kg event.
