= Agata Kaczmarska =

Polish boxer (born 1998)

Personal information
- Born: 29 April 1998 (age 28) Iłża, Poland
- Height: 1.96 m (6 ft 5 in)
- Weight: Heavyweight

Boxing career
Medal record
Women's amateur boxing
Representing Poland
World Championships
Gold medal – first place	2025 Liverpool	+80 kg

Agata Kaczmarska (born 29 April 1998) is a Polish amateur boxer in the heavyweight division. She is a gold medalist at the World Boxing Championships (2025), gold and bronze medalist at the Polish Championships, and silver medalist at the Youth World Championships.

== Career ==
In 2018, Kaczmarska competed at the European Championships in Sofia in the 81 kg category. In the quarterfinals, she lost on points to Elif Güneri of Turkey, finishing sixth. In November of the same year, at the World Championships in New Delhi, she was eliminated in the quarterfinals, losing to Güneri again, who was then the reigning European runner-up.

In 2025, at the World Boxing Championships, Kaczmarska won the gold medal in the +80 kg category.
