= Isaac Okoh =

English boxer

Personal information
- Nationality: England
- Parent: Chris Okoh (father)

Boxing career
Medal record
Men's amateur boxing
Representing England
Commonwealth Games
Gold medal – first place	2026 Glasgow	90 kg

Isaac Okoh is an English boxer. He competed at the 2026 Commonwealth Games, winning the gold medal in the men's 90 kg event.

== Personal life ==
Born in England, Okoh is of Nigerian descent. His father Chris Okoh was also a professional boxer.
