= 2025 World Boxing Championships =

First edition of amateur boxing tournament

- Venue: Liverpool Arena
- Location: Liverpool, England
- Dates: 4–14 September
- Competitors: 540 from 68 nations
- Website: Website

The 2025 World Boxing Championships were held from 4 to 14 September 2025 at the Liverpool Arena in Liverpool, England. Hosted by World Boxing, it was the first edition of the World Boxing Championships and featured men's and women's events. Athletes from five continents competed across 20 events. More than 540 boxers from 68 nations participated.

Twelve female boxers from the Dominican Republic, Nigeria, Fiji, the Philippines and the entire five-member French women's team were excluded from the tournament. This happened after they missed the deadline for sharing genetic sex test results.

== Medal table ==
* Host nation (England)

Rank	Nation	Gold	Silver	Bronze	Total
1	Kazakhstan	7	1	2	10
2	Uzbekistan	6	2	3	11
3	India	2	1	1	4
4	Brazil	1	3	0	4
5	Poland	1	2	0	3
6	Australia	1	1	1	3
7	Ireland	1	0	2	3
8	Chinese Taipei	1	0	1	2
9	England*	0	2	3	5
10	Turkey	0	2	1	3
11	Japan	0	1	2	3
12	Bulgaria	0	1	1	2
12	Mongolia	0	1	1	2
12	Spain	0	1	1	2
15	France	0	1	0	1
15	United States	0	1	0	1
17	China	0	0	5	5
18	Cuba	0	0	3	3
19	Azerbaijan	0	0	2	2
20	Austria	0	0	1	1
20	Canada	0	0	1	1
20	Colombia	0	0	1	1
20	Croatia	0	0	1	1
20	Georgia	0	0	1	1
20	Hungary	0	0	1	1
20	Italy	0	0	1	1
20	Jordan	0	0	1	1
20	South Korea	0	0	1	1
20	Ukraine	0	0	1	1
20	Venezuela	0	0	1	1
Totals (30 entries)		20	20	40	80

== Medalists ==
=== Men ===
Event	Gold	Silver	Bronze
50 kg	Sanzhar Tashkenbay; Kazakhstan	Aldarkhishigiin Battulga; Mongolia	Alejandro Claro; Cuba
50 kg	Sanzhar Tashkenbay; Kazakhstan	Aldarkhishigiin Battulga; Mongolia	Soushi Makino; Japan
55 kg	Makhmud Sabyrkhan; Kazakhstan	Rafael Lozano; Spain	Liu Chuang; China
55 kg	Makhmud Sabyrkhan; Kazakhstan	Rafael Lozano; Spain	Patsy Joyce; Ireland
60 kg	Abdumalik Khalokov; Uzbekistan	Luiz Gabriel Oliveira; Brazil	Shunsuke Kitamoto; Japan
60 kg	Abdumalik Khalokov; Uzbekistan	Luiz Gabriel Oliveira; Brazil	Radoslav Rosenov; Bulgaria
65 kg	Asadkhuja Muydinkhujaev; Uzbekistan	Yuri Falcão; Brazil	Erislandy Álvarez; Cuba
65 kg	Asadkhuja Muydinkhujaev; Uzbekistan	Yuri Falcão; Brazil	Lasha Guruli; Georgia
70 kg	Torekhan Sabyrkhan; Kazakhstan	Sewon Okazawa; Japan	Zeyad Ishaish; Jordan
70 kg	Torekhan Sabyrkhan; Kazakhstan	Sewon Okazawa; Japan	Odel Kamara; England
75 kg	Fazliddin Erkinboev; Uzbekistan	Rami Kiwan; Bulgaria	Callum Makin; England
75 kg	Fazliddin Erkinboev; Uzbekistan	Rami Kiwan; Bulgaria	Saidjamshid Jafarov; Azerbaijan
80 kg	Javokhir Ummataliev; Uzbekistan	Yojerlin César; France	Gabrijel Veočić; Croatia
80 kg	Javokhir Ummataliev; Uzbekistan	Yojerlin César; France	Pylyp Akilov; Hungary
85 kg	Akmaljon Isroilov; Uzbekistan	Teagn Stott; England	Danylo Zhasan; Ukraine
85 kg	Akmaljon Isroilov; Uzbekistan	Teagn Stott; England	Michael Derouiche; Austria
90 kg	Turabek Khabibullaev; Uzbekistan	Isaías Ribeiro; Brazil	Loren Alfonso; Azerbaijan
90 kg	Turabek Khabibullaev; Uzbekistan	Isaías Ribeiro; Brazil	Enmanuel Reyes; Spain
+90 kg	Aibek Oralbay; Kazakhstan	Jakhongir Zokirov; Uzbekistan	Bayikewuzi Danabieke; China
+90 kg	Aibek Oralbay; Kazakhstan	Jakhongir Zokirov; Uzbekistan	Julio César La Cruz; Cuba

=== Women ===
Event	Gold	Silver	Bronze
48 kg	Minakshi Hooda; India	Nazym Kyzaibay; Kazakhstan	Sabina Bobokulova; Uzbekistan
48 kg	Minakshi Hooda; India	Nazym Kyzaibay; Kazakhstan	Lutsaikhany Altantsetseg; Mongolia
51 kg	Alua Balkibekova; Kazakhstan	Buse Naz Çakıroğlu; Turkey	Feruza Kazakova; Uzbekistan
51 kg	Alua Balkibekova; Kazakhstan	Buse Naz Çakıroğlu; Turkey	Qi Xinyu; China
54 kg	Huang Hsiao-wen; Chinese Taipei	Yoseline Perez; United States	Sirine Charaabi; Italy
54 kg	Huang Hsiao-wen; Chinese Taipei	Yoseline Perez; United States	Im Ae-ji; South Korea
57 kg	Jaismine Lamboria; India	Julia Szeremeta; Poland	Valeria Arboleda; Colombia
57 kg	Jaismine Lamboria; India	Julia Szeremeta; Poland	Omailyn Alcalá; Venezuela
60 kg	Rebeca Santos; Brazil	Aneta Rygielska; Poland	Viktoriya Grafeyeva; Kazakhstan
60 kg	Rebeca Santos; Brazil	Aneta Rygielska; Poland	Yang Chengyu; China
65 kg	Aida Abikeyeva; Kazakhstan	Navbakhor Khamidova; Uzbekistan	Gráinne Walsh; Ireland
65 kg	Aida Abikeyeva; Kazakhstan	Navbakhor Khamidova; Uzbekistan	Chen Nien-chin; Chinese Taipei
70 kg	Natalya Bogdanova; Kazakhstan	Lekeisha Pergoliti; Australia	Aziza Zokirova; Uzbekistan
70 kg	Natalya Bogdanova; Kazakhstan	Lekeisha Pergoliti; Australia	Chantelle Reid; England
75 kg	Aoife O'Rourke; Ireland	Büşra Işıldar; Turkey	Emma-Sue Greentree; Australia
75 kg	Aoife O'Rourke; Ireland	Büşra Işıldar; Turkey	Wang Lina; China
80 kg	Eseta Flint; Australia	Emily Asquith; England	Viktoria Penney; Canada
80 kg	Eseta Flint; Australia	Emily Asquith; England	Pooja Rani; India
+80 kg	Agata Kaczmarska; Poland	Nupur Sheoran; India	Şeyma Düztaş; Turkey
+80 kg	Agata Kaczmarska; Poland	Nupur Sheoran; India	Yeldana Talipova; Kazakhstan

== Participating nations ==
A total of 540 competitors from the national teams of the following 68 countries competed.

- Albania (5)
- Algeria (4)
- Australia (12)
- Austria (4)
- Azerbaijan (11)
- Belgium (8)
- Bosnia and Herzegovina (1)
- Brazil (14)
- Boxing Refugee Team (2)
- Bulgaria (11)
- Canada (8)
- China (16)
- Colombia (4)
- Croatia (11)
- Cuba (8)
- Czech Republic (6)
- Denmark (3)
- Dominican Republic (7)
- England (20)
- Spain (12)
- Estonia (2)
- Fiji (5)
- Finland (3)
- France (6)
- Georgia (7)
- Germany (9)
- Greece (6)
- Hong Kong (1)
- Hungary (16)
- India (20)
- Iran (7)
- Ireland (17)
- Italy (13)
- Jamaica (1)
- Jordan (7)
- Japan (12)
- Kazakhstan (20)
- Kyrgyzstan (8)
- South Korea (12)
- Kosovo (4)
- Saudi Arabia (9)
- Lithuania (7)
- Mexico (12)
- Mongolia (10)
- Montenegro (2)
- Netherlands (5)
- Nigeria (1)
- Norway (3)
- New Zealand (7)
- Panama (1)
- Philippines (6)
- Poland (19)
- Samoa (2)
- Scotland (10)
- Singapore (1)
- Sierra Leone (1)
- Switzerland (1)
- Slovakia (4)
- Sweden (3)
- Syria (1)
- Turkmenistan (4)
- Chinese Taipei (8)
- Turkey (20)
- Ukraine (20)
- United States (14)
- Uzbekistan (18)
- Venezuela (6)
- Wales (2)
