= World Boxing Championships =

Amateur boxing tournament by World Boxing

- Status: Active
- Genre: Boxing World Championships
- Frequency: Biennial
- Years active: 2025–present
- Inaugurated: 2025 Liverpool
- Next event: 2027
- Organiser: World Boxing
- Website: Website

The World Boxing Championships is an amateur boxing tournament organised by World Boxing, the International Olympic Committee-recognised governing body of the sport.

The event was created to crown elite world champions outside the auspices of the International Boxing Association, the previous governing body for the sport which had lost recognition from the IOC. The IBA Men's World Boxing Championships and their women's counterpart which had previously crowned the only recognised world champions in the amateur sport continue to be held by the IBA every two years without IOC recognition.

The first edition of the new event was held at the Liverpool Arena in Liverpool, England in 2025. It is anticipated that future editions of the new World Boxing Championships will form part of the qualification process for boxing tournaments within the 2028 and later Olympic Games.

== Editions ==
Year	Host	Dates	Ref
2025	(England) Liverpool	4 – 14 September	
2027	TBA		

== Medal table ==
As of 2025 edition

Rank	Nation	Gold	Silver	Bronze	Total
1	Kazakhstan	7	1	2	10
2	Uzbekistan	6	2	3	11
3	India	2	1	1	4
4	Brazil	1	3	0	4
5	Poland	1	2	0	3
6	Australia	1	1	1	3
7	Ireland	1	0	2	3
8	Chinese Taipei	1	0	1	2
9	England	0	2	3	5
10	Turkey	0	2	1	3
11	Japan	0	1	2	3
12	Bulgaria	0	1	1	2
12	Mongolia	0	1	1	2
12	Spain	0	1	1	2
15	France	0	1	0	1
15	United States	0	1	0	1
17	China	0	0	5	5
18	Cuba	0	0	3	3
19	Azerbaijan	0	0	2	2
20	Austria	0	0	1	1
20	Canada	0	0	1	1
20	Colombia	0	0	1	1
20	Croatia	0	0	1	1
20	Georgia	0	0	1	1
20	Hungary	0	0	1	1
20	Italy	0	0	1	1
20	Jordan	0	0	1	1
20	South Korea	0	0	1	1
20	Ukraine	0	0	1	1
20	Venezuela	0	0	1	1
Totals (30 entries)		20	20	40	80

== See also ==
- World Boxing
- World Boxing Cup
- World Boxing U19 Championships
