= Boxing at the 2023 European Games – Women's light flyweight =

Women's light flyweight boxing at the 2023 European Games
- Venue: Nowy Targ Arena
- Location: Nowy Targ, Poland
- Dates: 25 June – 2 July
- Competitors: 18 from 18 nations

Medalists
gold medal	Buse Naz Çakıroğlu	Turkey
silver medal	Wassila Lkhadiri	France
bronze medal	Giordana Sorrentino	Italy
bronze medal	Laura Fuertes	Spain

The women's light flyweight boxing event at the 2023 European Games was held between 25 June and 2 July 2023.

== Results ==
=== Finals ===
Semi-finals
Buse Naz Çakıroğlu (TUR)	5
Giordana Sorrentino (ITA)	0
Laura Fuertes (ESP)	0
Wassila Lkhadiri (FRA)	3

Final
Buse Naz Çakıroğlu (TUR)	5
Wassila Lkhadiri (FRA)	0

=== Top half ===
==== Section 1 ====
Round of 32
Zlatislava Chukanova (BUL)	1
Natalia Rok (POL)	4

Round of 16
Maxi Klötzer (GER)	1
Natalia Rok (POL)	4
Buse Naz Çakıroğlu (TUR)	5
Anush Grigoryan (ARM)	0

Quarterfinals
Natalia Rok (POL)	0
Buse Naz Çakıroğlu (TUR)	5

==== Section 2 ====
Round of 32

Round of 16
Nina Radovanović (SRB)	5
Petra Mezei (HUN)	0
Demie-Jade Resztan (GBR)	0
Giordana Sorrentino (ITA)	5

Quarterfinals
Nina Radovanović (SRB)	1
Giordana Sorrentino (ITA)	4

=== Bottom half ===
==== Section 3 ====
Round of 32
Nela Freiherrová (CZE)	0
Sofie Vinther Rosshaug (DEN)	5

Round of 16
Laura Fuertes (ESP)	3
Sofie Vinther Rosshaug (DEN)	0
Rita Soares (POR)	DSQ
Anakhanim Ismayilova (AZE)

Quarterfinals
Laura Fuertes (ESP)	5
Rita Soares (POR)	0

==== Section 4 ====
Round of 32
Tetyana Kob (UKR)	4
Pihla Kaivo-oja (FIN)	1

Round of 16
Wassila Lkhadiri (FRA)	5
Nicole Ďuríková (SVK)	0
Tetyana Kob (UKR)	1
Daina Moorehouse (IRL)	4

Quarterfinals
Wassila Lkhadiri (FRA)	3
Daina Moorehouse (IRL)	2
