= 2023 IBA Women's World Boxing Championships – Light flyweight =

Light flyweight at the 2023 IBA Women's World Boxing Championships
- Venue: K. D. Jadhav Indoor Hall
- Location: New Delhi, India
- Dates: 16–26 March
- Competitors: 35 from 35 nations

Medalists
gold medal	Nikhat Zareen	India
silver medal	Nguyễn Thị Tâm	Vietnam
bronze medal	Ingrit Valencia	Colombia
bronze medal	Wassila Lkhadiri	France

The Light flyweight competition at the 2023 IBA Women's World Boxing Championships was held between 16 and 26 March 2023.

== Results ==
=== Finals ===
Semi-finals
(India) Nikhat Zareen	5
(Colombia) Ingrit Valencia	0
(Vietnam) Nguyễn Thị Tâm	4
(France) Wassila Lkhadiri	1

Final
(India) Nikhat Zareen	5
(Vietnam) Nguyễn Thị Tâm	0

=== Top half ===
==== Section 1 ====
Round of 64
(India) Nikhat Zareen	RSC
(Azerbaijan) Anakhanim Ismayilova

Round of 32
(Algeria) Roumaysa Boualam	0
(India) Nikhat Zareen	5
(Mexico) Fátima Herrera	RSC
(Jordan) Hanan Nassar
(Brazil) Caroline de Almeida	5
(Belarus) Yana Burym	0
(Thailand) Chuthamat Raksat	5
(Uzbekistan) Aziza Yokubova	0

Round of 16
(India) Nikhat Zareen	5
(Mexico) Fátima Herrera	0
(Brazil) Caroline de Almeida	0
(Thailand) Chuthamat Raksat	5

Quarterfinals
(India) Nikhat Zareen	5
(Thailand) Chuthamat Raksat	2

==== Section 2 ====
Round of 64

Round of 32
(Colombia) Ingrit Valencia	RSC
(Kenya) Veronica Mbithe
(Bulgaria) Zlatislava Chukanova	5
(Philippines) Aira Villegas	0
(Hungary) Petra Mezei	0
(Puerto Rico) Krystal Rosado	5
(Russia) Ekaterina Paltceva	1
(Italy) Giordana Sorrentino	4

Round of 16
(Colombia) Ingrit Valencia	5
(Bulgaria) Zlatislava Chukanova	0
(Puerto Rico) Krystal Rosado	0
(Italy) Giordana Sorrentino	5

Quarterfinals
(Colombia) Ingrit Valencia	4
(Italy) Giordana Sorrentino	1

=== Bottom half ===
==== Section 3 ====
Round of 64
(Turkey) Rabia Topuz	0
(Mongolia) Balsangiin Möngönsaran	5

Round of 32
(Spain) Laura Fuertes	4
(Mongolia) Balsangiin Möngönsaran	3
(Singapore) Danisha Mathialagan	4
(Tajikistan) Ruhafzo Haqnazarova	0
(Nepal) Asmita Duwal	0
(Botswana) Lethabo Modukanele	5
(Vietnam) Nguyễn Thị Tâm	5
(Kazakhstan) Nazym Kyzaibay	0

Round of 16
(Spain) Laura Fuertes	4
(Singapore) Danisha Mathialagan	1
(Botswana) Lethabo Modukanele	0
(Vietnam) Nguyễn Thị Tâm	5

Quarterfinals
(Spain) Laura Fuertes	0
(Vietnam) Nguyễn Thị Tâm	5

==== Section 4 ====
Round of 64
(China) Chang Yuan	2
(France) Wassila Lkhadiri	5

Round of 32
(Morocco) Rabab Cheddar	5
(Chinese Taipei) Lin Ci-en	0
(Eswatini) Veliswa Magaya	0
(South Africa) Thandolwethu Mathiba	5
(South Korea) Bak Cho-rong	2
(Armenia) Anush Grigoryan	5
(France) Wassila Lkhadiri	4
(Japan) Tsukimi Namiki	3

Round of 16
(Morocco) Rabab Cheddar	5
(South Africa) Thandolwethu Mathiba	0
(Armenia) Anush Grigoryan	3
(France) Wassila Lkhadiri	4

Quarterfinals
(Morocco) Rabab Cheddar	0
(France) Wassila Lkhadiri	5
