= 2022 IBA Women's World Boxing Championships – Light flyweight =

Light flyweight at the 2022 IBA Women's World Boxing Championships
- Venue: Başakşehir Youth and Sports Facility
- Location: Istanbul, Turkey
- Dates: 12–20 May
- Competitors: 30 from 30 nations

Medalists
gold medal	Buse Naz Çakıroğlu	Turkey
silver medal	Ingrit Valencia	Colombia
bronze medal	Aziza Yokubova	Uzbekistan
bronze medal	Laura Fuertes	Spain

The Light flyweight competition at the 2022 IBA Women's World Boxing Championships was held from 12 to 20 May 2022.

== Results ==
=== Finals ===
Semi-finals
(Colombia) Ingrit Valencia	4
(Uzbekistan) Aziza Yokubova	1
(Turkey) Buse Naz Çakıroğlu	4
(Spain) Laura Fuertes	0

Final
(Colombia) Ingrit Valencia	0
(Turkey) Buse Naz Çakıroğlu	5

=== Top half ===
==== Section 1 ====
Round of 32
(Romania) Eugenia Anghel	0
(India) Anamika Hooda	5
(Kazakhstan) Nazym Kyzaibay	2
(Colombia) Ingrit Valencia	3
(Tajikistan) Ruhafzo Haqnazarova	5
(Bolivia) Ayda Santalla	0

Round of 16
(Australia) Kristy Lee Harris	0
(India) Anamika Hooda	5
(Colombia) Ingrit Valencia	5
(Tajikistan) Ruhafzo Haqnazarova	0

Quarterfinals
(India) Anamika Hooda	0
(Colombia) Ingrit Valencia	5

==== Section 2 ====
Round of 32
(Republic of Ireland) Caitlin Fryers	5
(South Africa) Thandolwethu Mathiba	0
(Italy) Giordana Sorrentino	5
(Egypt) Eman Mohamed	0
(Armenia) Anush Grigoryan	3
(Finland) Pihla Kaivo-oja	2
(Uzbekistan) Aziza Yokubova	5
(United States) Jennifer Lozano	0

Round of 16
(Republic of Ireland) Caitlin Fryers	0
(Italy) Giordana Sorrentino	5
(Armenia) Anush Grigoryan	1
(Uzbekistan) Aziza Yokubova	4

Quarterfinals
(Italy) Giordana Sorrentino	1
(Uzbekistan) Aziza Yokubova	4

=== Bottom half ===
==== Section 3 ====
Round of 32
(Turkey) Buse Naz Çakıroğlu	5
(Mongolia) Balsangiin Möngönsaran	0
(Algeria) Roumaysa Boualam	4
(Japan) Hikaru Shinohara	1
(Germany) Maxi Klötzer	0
(Philippines) Aira Villegas	5
(South Korea) Kang Sun-hee	0
(Serbia) Nina Radovanović	5

Round of 16
(Turkey) Buse Naz Çakıroğlu	5
(Algeria) Roumaysa Boualam	0
(Philippines) Aira Villegas	5
(Serbia) Nina Radovanović	0

Quarterfinals
(Turkey) Buse Naz Çakıroğlu	5
(Philippines) Aira Villegas	0

==== Section 4 ====
Round of 32
(Spain) Laura Fuertes	3
(France) Romane Moulai	2
(Ukraine) Olha Shalimova	2
(Bulgaria) Zlatislava Chukanova	3
(Argentina) Milagros Flores	5
(Wales) Helen Jones	0

Round of 16
(Spain) Laura Fuertes	5
(Bulgaria) Zlatislava Chukanova	0
(Argentina) Milagros Flores	5
(Chinese Taipei) Chen Tzu-hsuan	0

Quarterfinals
(Spain) Laura Fuertes	5
(Argentina) Milagros Flores	0
