= Wassila Lkhadiri =

French boxer (born 1995)

Personal information
- Nationality: French
- Born: 14 September 1995 (age 31) Ajaccio, Corsica, France
- Height: 1.60 m (5 ft 3 in)
- Weight: 50 kg (110 lb)

Boxing career
- Weight class: Flyweight; Light flyweight
Medal record
Women's amateur boxing
Representing France
World Championships
Bronze medal – third place	2023 New Delhi	Light flyweight
European Games
Silver medal – second place	2023 Kraków	Light flyweight
European Championships
Bronze medal – third place	2019 Alcobendas	Flyweight
Bronze medal – third place	2014 Bucharest	Flyweight
Mediterranean Games
Bronze medal – third place	2026 Taranto	Bantamweight

Wassila Lkhadri (born 14 September 1995) is a French boxer from Ajaccio, Corsica. She is a silver medalist at the European Games and has won bronze medals at the World Championships, European Championships, and Mediterranean Games.

== Amateur career ==
In 2014, Lkhadri was crowned French amateur champion in under 54 kg (bantamweight) and then won the bronze medal at the European amateur championships in Bucharest in the under 51 kg (flyweight) category. She won the bronze medal in the flyweight category at the 2019 European amateur championships in Alcobendas.

At the 2023 Women's World Amateur Boxing Championships in New Delhi, Lkhadri won the bronze medal in the under 50 kg category. At the 2023 European Games, on 28 June 2023, Lkhadri defeated Nicole Ďuríková the round of 16, Daina Moorehouse in the quarterfinals, and Laura Fuertes in the semifinals. Heading the gold medal match, she lost to Buse Naz Çakıroğlu, thus qualifying for the boxing events at the 2024 Summer Olympics.

In August 2026, Lkhadiri competed at the Mediterranean Games and won a bronze medal in the bantamweight category.

== Personal life ==
Lkhadiri has a daughter, who was born in December 2021.
