= 2026 European Boxing Championships – Women's 54 kg =

Women's 54 kg at the 2026 European Boxing Championships
- Venue: Asics Arena
- Location: Sofia, Bulgaria
- Dates: 18–25 September
- Competitors: 17 from 17 nations

Medalists
| gold medal | Sara Ćirković | Serbia |
| silver medal | Pihla Kaivo-oja | Finland |
| bronze medal | Anastasiia Kool | Russia |
| bronze medal | Lenka Bernardová | Czech Republic |

The women's 54 kg competition at the 2026 European Boxing Championships was held from 18 to 25 September 2026.

== Results ==
=== Final ===
| Final; 25 September |
| (Serbia) Sara Ćirković | 3 |
| (Finland) Pihla Kaivo-oja | 2 |

=== Top half ===
Round of 32; 18 September
(Portugal) Sofia Resende | 3
(Hungary) Kármen Horváth | 2

Round of 16; 20 September
(Italy) Sirine Charaabi | 5
(Portugal) Sofia Resende | 0
(Russia) Anastasiia Kool | RSC
(Armenia) Lusya Avetisyan
(Azerbaijan) Zeynab Rahimova
(Turkey) Buse Naz Çakıroğlu | RSC
(Ukraine) Inna Statkevych | 0
(Serbia) Sara Ćirković | 5

Quarterfinals; 23 September
(Italy) Sirine Charaabi | 2
(Russia) Anastasiia Kool | 3
(Turkey) Buse Naz Çakıroğlu | 2
(Serbia) Sara Ćirković | 3

Semifinals; 24 September
(Russia) Anastasiia Kool | 0
(Serbia) Sara Ćirković | 5

=== Bottom half ===
Round of 16; 20 September
(England) Lauren Mackie | RSC
(Moldova) Iulia Coroli
(Bulgaria) Venelina Poptoleva | 2
(Czech Republic) Lenka Bernardová | 3
(France) Wassila Lkhadiri | 4
(Republic of Ireland) Jennifer Lehane | 1
(Finland) Pihla Kaivo-oja | 5
(Poland) Wiktoria Rogalińska | 0

Quarterfinals; 23 September
(England) Lauren Mackie | 0
(Czech Republic) Lenka Bernardová | 5
(France) Wassila Lkhadiri | 1
(Finland) Pihla Kaivo-oja | 4

Semifinals; 24 September
(Czech Republic) Lenka Bernardová | 1
(Finland) Pihla Kaivo-oja | 4
