= Klötzer =

Klötzer is a surname. Notable people with the surname include:

- Bernd Klötzer (1941–2025), German artist
- Kuno Klötzer (1922–2011), German football coach
- Maxi Klötzer (born 2000), German boxer
- Wolfgang Klötzer (1925–2015), German art historian
