= 2026 European Boxing Championships – Women's 51 kg =

Women's 51 kg at the 2026 European Boxing Championships
- Venue: Asics Arena
- Location: Sofia, Bulgaria
- Dates: 19–25 September
- Competitors: 15 from 15 nations

Medalists
gold medal	Hatice Akbaş	Turkey
silver medal	Laura Fuertes	Spain
bronze medal	Maxi Klötzer	Germany
bronze medal	Natalia Kuczewska	Poland

The women's 51 kg competition at the 2026 European Boxing Championships was held from 19 to 25 September 2026.

== Results ==
Round of 16; 19 September
(Republic of Ireland) Daina Moorehouse	3
(Bulgaria) Zlatislava Chukanova	2
(Ukraine) Yaroslava Marynchuk	2
(Hungary) Laura Horváth	3
(Italy) Martina Vassallo
(Germany) Maxi Klötzer	WO
(Poland) Natalia Kuczewska	5
(Russia) Ruket Kushtova	0
(Moldova) Maia Odajiu
(Belarus) Yuliya Apanasovich	ABD
(Serbia) Nikolina Džida	0
(England) Ruby White	5
(Turkey) Hatice Akbaş	5
(France) Romane Moulai	0

Quarterfinals; 22 September
(Spain) Laura Fuertes	4
(Republic of Ireland) Daina Moorehouse	1
(Hungary) Laura Horváth	0
(Germany) Maxi Klötzer	5
(Poland) Natalia Kuczewska	3
(Belarus) Yuliya Apanasovich	2
(England) Ruby White	2
(Turkey) Hatice Akbaş	3

Semifinals; 23 September
(Spain) Laura Fuertes	3
(Germany) Maxi Klötzer	2
(Poland) Natalia Kuczewska	0
(Turkey) Hatice Akbaş	5

Final; 25 September
(Spain) Laura Fuertes	0
(Turkey) Hatice Akbaş	5
