= 2026 European Boxing Championships – Men's 65 kg =

Men's 65 kg at the 2026 European Boxing Championships
- Venue: Asics Arena
- Location: Sofia, Bulgaria
- Dates: 18–24 September
- Competitors: 26 from 26 nations

Medalists
gold medal	Elvin Aliiev	Ukraine
silver medal	Hugo Grau	France
bronze medal	Ismail Umar	Finland
bronze medal	Alexandru Paraschiv	Moldova

The men's 65 kg competition at the 2026 European Boxing Championships was held from 18 to 24 September 2026.

== Results ==
=== Final ===
Final; 24 September
(France) Hugo Grau
(Ukraine) Elvin Aliiev	RSC-I

=== Top half ===
Round of 32; 18 September
(Germany) Mohamed Siala	2
(Republic of Ireland) Dean Clancy	3
(Israel) Ahmad Shtiwi	1
(Spain) Oier Ibarretxe	4
(Belarus) Aliaksandr Radzionau	0
(Poland) Bartłomiej Rośkowicz	5
(Russia) Rasul Magomedov	5
(Romania) Arun Tudoroiu	0
(Hungary) Kruzító Kovács	0
(Georgia (country)) Lasha Gagnidze	5

Round of 16; 20 September
(France) Hugo Grau	5
(Republic of Ireland) Dean Clancy	0
(Spain) Oier Ibarretxe	2
(Poland) Bartłomiej Rośkowicz	3
(Finland) Ismail Umar	4
(Russia) Rasul Magomedov	0
(Georgia (country)) Lasha Gagnidze	3
(England) Patris Mughalzai	2

Quarter-finals; 22 September
(France) Hugo Grau	3
(Poland) Bartłomiej Rośkowicz	2
(Finland) Ismail Umar	5
(Georgia (country)) Lasha Gagnidze	0

Semifinals; 23 September
(France) Hugo Grau	4
(Finland) Ismail Umar	1

=== Bottom half ===
Round of 32; 18 September
(Belgium) Rasul Tisayev	5
(Slovakia) Juraj Bóna	0
(Azerbaijan) Malik Hasanov	5
(Turkey) Bilge Kağan Kanlı	0
(Italy) Giacomo Giannotti	1
(Armenia) Artur Sahakyan	4
(Croatia) Filip Poturović	0
(Austria) Emin Yildiz	5
(Denmark) Qalid Osman	5
(Portugal) David Pegado	0

Round of 16; 20 September
(Ukraine) Elvin Aliiev	5
(Belgium) Rasul Tisayev	0
(Azerbaijan) Malik Hasanov	RSC
(Bulgaria) Rumen Rumenov
(Armenia) Artur Sahakyan	2
(Austria) Emin Yildiz	3
(Denmark) Qalid Osman	0
(Moldova) Alexandru Paraschiv	5

Quarter-finals; 22 September
(Ukraine) Elvin Aliiev	3
(Azerbaijan) Malik Hasanov	2
(Austria) Emin Yildiz	0
(Moldova) Alexandru Paraschiv	5

Semifinals; 23 September
(Ukraine) Elvin Aliiev	5
(Moldova) Alexandru Paraschiv	0
