= Nurselen Yalgettekin =

Turkish female boxer (born 2004)

Personal information
- Nationality: Turkish
- Born: 28 May 2004 (age 22) Cizre, Şırnak, Turkey
- Education: Şırnak University
- Height: 1.55 m (5 ft 1 in)
- Weight: 48 kg (106 lb)

Boxing career
Medal record
Women's amateur boxing
Representing Turkey
European Championships
Bronze medal – third place	2026 Sofia	48 kg
World Cup
Bronze medal – third place	2025 Warsaw	48 kg
European U23 Championships
Gold medal – first place	2025 Budapest	48 kg
European U22 Championships
Gold medal – first place	2024 Sofia	48 kg
Silver medal – second place	2023 Budva	48 kg
European Youth Championships
Silver medal – second place	2021 Budva	48 kg

Nurselen Yalgettekin (born 28 May 2004) is a Turkish female boxer competing in the minimumweight (48 kg) division. She is a member pf Fenerbahçe Boxing and represents Turkey at international competitions.

== Sport career ==
Yalgettekin is a member of Fenerbahçe Boxing.

She started boxing sport in her hometown in 2018. In 2021, she won the gold medal in the 48 kg division at the Women's Youth Turkish Boxing Championship held in Elazığ. That same year, she won a bronze medal at the European Youth Boxing Championships in Budva, Montenegro.

In 2023, she became the champion in the 48 kg division at the Women's U22 Turkish Championship in Kocaeli. At the European U22 Championships in Budva, Montenegro, she won the silver medal.

In 2024, she won the Turkish championship in the senior women's 48 kg division. At the European U22 Boxing Championships in Sofia, Bulgaria, she won the gold medal.

In 2025, she became champion in the 48 kg division at the Women's Elite Turkish Individual Boxing Championships in Darıca, Kocaeli. After winning her opening bout at the World Women's Championships in Niš, Serbia, she was eliminated in the Round of 16. She advanced to the final in the 48 kg division at the 2025 World Cup in Warsaw, Poland, and won the gold medal. She became the European champion in the 48 kg division at the 2025 European U23 Boxing Championships in Budapest, Hungary. The bout between Yalgettekin and Hungary's Lilla Szeleczki was named the best final match of the tournament.

She became champion again in the 48 kg division at the 2026 Women's Elite Turkish Individual Boxing Championships in Darıca. She won the gold medal at the 63rd Belgrade Winner International Boxing Tournament in Serbia. At the 2026 European Championships in Sofia, she lost the semifinals, and took a bronze medal.

== Personal life ==
Born on 28 May 2004, Nurselen Yalgettekin is a native of Cizre in Şırnak Province, southeastern Turkey.

After graduating from Cizre Science High School, she entered Department of Physical Education and Sports Teaching at Hacettepe University in Ankara. She then transferred to the School of Physical Education and Sports at Şırnak University under special student status.
