= Daina Moorehouse =

Irish boxer (born 2001)

Daina Moorehouse OLY
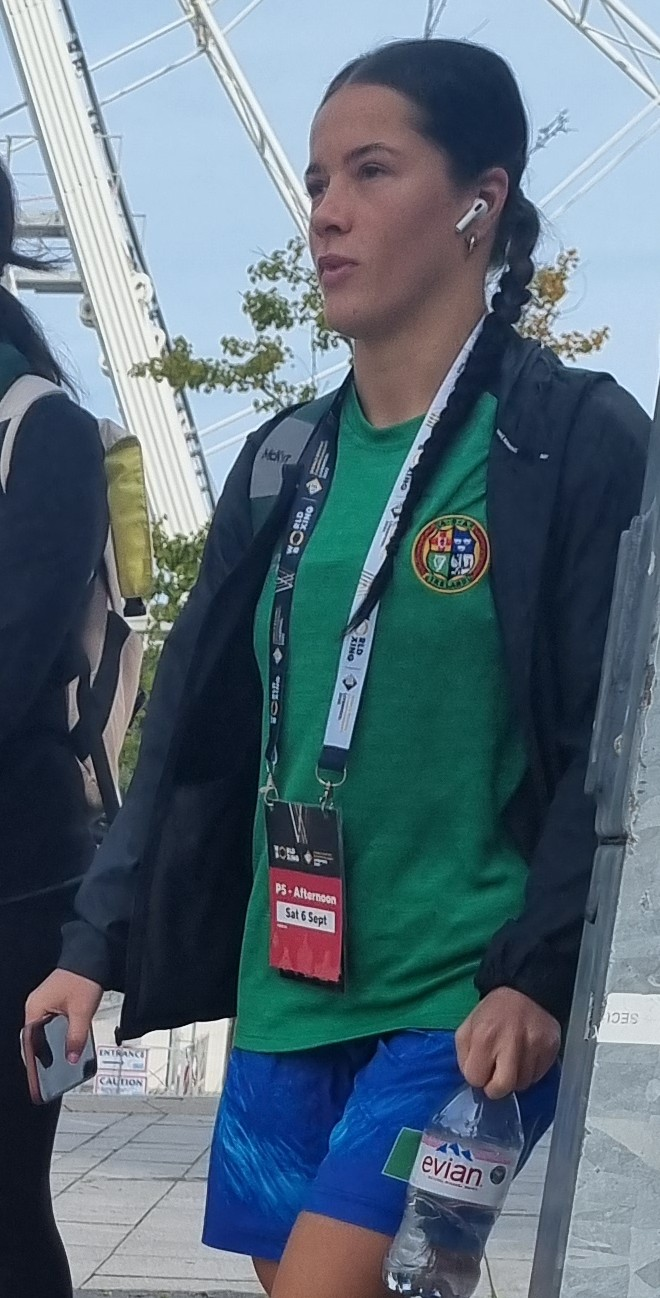
- 2025 World Boxing Championships

Personal information
- Born: 16 September 2001 (age 25) Dublin, Ireland
- Height: 150 cm (4 ft 11 in)

Sport
- Sport: Boxing
- Weight class: Light flyweight, Flyweight
- Club: Enniskerry Boxing Club
Medal record
Women's amateur boxing
Representing Ireland
European Youth Boxing Championships
Gold medal – first place	2018 Roseto degli Abruzzi Italy	48 kg
Bronze medal – third place	2019 Sofia Bulgaria	48 kg
European Junior Boxing Championships
Gold medal – first place	2017 Sofia Bulgaria	48 kg

Daina Moorehouse OLY (born 16 September 2001) is an Irish amateur boxer who won gold medals at light flyweight at the 2017 European Junior Boxing Championships and the 2018 European Youth Boxing Championships. She also represented Ireland at the 2024 Summer Olympics.

== Career ==
Moorehouse started boxing aged 11 and claimed her first Irish age-group title in 2015. Fighting at light-flyweight, she won a gold medal at the 2017 European Junior Boxing Championships in Sofia, Bulgaria, defeating England's Simran Kaur in the final.

She claimed gold at the 2018 European Youth Boxing Championships beating Russia's Kseniia Beschastnova on a 4–1 split decision to top the podium in Roseto degli Abruzzi, Italy. Moorehouse had to settle for bronze at the 2019 European Youth Championships in Sofia, Bulgaria.

In November 2019, Moorehouse won her first Irish national elite title, beating Shannon Sweeney by unanimous decision in the final. Moving up a weight division to flyweight for her first major senior international competition, she lost in the quarter-finals at the 2023 European Games in Poland, going down via split decision to France's Wassila Lkhadiri.

Having lost out at the World Boxing Olympic Qualification Tournament 1 in Italy in March 2024, Moorehouse finally secured her place at the 2024 Summer Olympics at the World Olympic Qualification Tournament 2 in Thailand in June 2024, overcoming a point deduction to defeat Zlatislava Chukanova from Bulgaria by split decision in the crucial bout. Her Olympic place was officially confirmed when Ireland named their boxing team on 28 June 2024. She was given a bye into the second round where she lost to 2023 European Games silver medalist Wassila Lkhadiri from France by 4:1 split decision.

Moorehouse was selected for the 2025 IBA Women's World Boxing Championships in Niš, Serbia. She was given a bye through to the second round where she faced the competition's eighth seed Hu Meiyi from China. Moorehouse lost via 4:1 split decision.

She was chosen to represent Ireland in the 51 kg category at the World Boxing Championships in Liverpool, England, in September 2025. Moorehouse lost in the first round to Spain's Laura Fuertes Fernández by 3:2 split decision.

At the 2026 European Championships in Sofia, Bulgaria, she competed for Ireland in the 51 kg division and defeated the host nation's Zlatislava Chukanova 3:2 in her opening bout, before losing to eventual silver medalist, Laura Fuertes from Spain, in the quarter-finals.
