= 2026 European Boxing Championships – Women's 48 kg =

Women's 48 kg at the 2026 European Boxing Championships
- Venue: Asics Arena
- Location: Sofia, Bulgaria
- Dates: 19–24 September
- Competitors: 14 from 14 nations

Medalists
gold medal	Iuliia Chumgalakova	Russia
silver medal	Hanna Okhota	Ukraine
bronze medal	Nurselen Yalgettekin	Turkey
bronze medal	Angelika Krysztoforska	Poland

The women's 48 kg competition at the 2026 European Boxing Championships was held from 19 to 24 September 2026.

== Results ==
Round of 16; 19 September
(Slovakia) Nicole Ďuríková	0
(Hungary) Lilla Szeleczki	5
(Belarus) Iryna Vinahradava	RSC
(Greece) Athina Avramidou
(Finland) Laura Myllymäki	0
(Turkey) Nurselen Yalgettekin	5
(Spain) Marta López	5
(Armenia) Heghine Petrosyan	0
(Russia) Iuliia Chumgalakova	5
(Georgia (country)) Nino Chitadze	0
(Republic of Ireland) Shannon Sweeney	1
(Italy) Chiara Mosetti	4

Quarterfinals; 22 September
(Ukraine) Hanna Okhota	5
(Hungary) Lilla Szeleczki	0
(Belarus) Iryna Vinahradava	0
(Turkey) Nurselen Yalgettekin	5
(Spain) Marta López	1
(Russia) Iuliia Chumgalakova	4
(Italy) Chiara Mosetti	0
(Poland) Angelika Krysztoforska	5

Semifinals; 23 September
(Ukraine) Hanna Okhota	4
(Turkey) Nurselen Yalgettekin	1
(Russia) Iuliia Chumgalakova	5
(Poland) Angelika Krysztoforska	0

Final; 24 September
(Ukraine) Hanna Okhota	0
(Russia) Iuliia Chumgalakova	5
