= 2024 IBA Youth World Boxing Championships =

Boxing competition

- Location: Budva, Montenegro
- Dates: 22 October – 3 November 2024
- Competitors: 595 from 73 nations

The 2024 IBA Youth World Boxing Championships took place in Budva, Montenegro from 22 October to 3 November 2024.

== Medals table ==
* Host nation (Montenegro)

Rank	Nation	Gold	Silver	Bronze	Total
1	Kazakhstan	6	1	10	17
2	Uzbekistan	5	5	3	13
3	Russia	5	2	1	8
4	China	3	3	4	10
5	Ireland	3	0	0	3
6	Turkey	1	2	3	6
7	North Korea	1	1	0	2
8	Mexico	1	0	1	2
9	Azerbaijan	0	2	3	5
10	IBA Neutral	0	2	1	3
11	Cuba	0	2	0	2
12	Iran	0	1	2	3
13	France	0	1	1	2
14	Colombia	0	1	0	1
14	Puerto Rico	0	1	0	1
14	Spain	0	1	0	1
17	Armenia	0	0	3	3
17	Poland	0	0	3	3
19	Greece	0	0	2	2
19	Kyrgyzstan	0	0	2	2
19	Romania	0	0	2	2
19	Tunisia	0	0	2	2
19	Venezuela	0	0	2	2
24	Belarus	0	0	1	1
24	Bulgaria	0	0	1	1
24	Morocco	0	0	1	1
24	New Zealand	0	0	1	1
24	Serbia	0	0	1	1
Totals (28 entries)		25	25	50	100

== Schedule ==
Preliminary rounds
Quarterfinals
Semifinals
Final

Weight category	23 Oct	24 Oct	25 Oct	26 Oct	27 Oct	28 Oct	29 Oct	30 Oct	31 Oct	1 Nov	2 Nov	3 Nov	Total
Men
Minimumweight (48 kg)		8			8		4		2		1		23
Flyweight (51 kg)	2		16		8			4	2			1	33
Bantamweight (54 kg)	2	16			8		4		2		1		33
Featherweight (57 kg)	8			16		8		4	2			1	39
Lightweight (60 kg)	7			16		8		4	2		1		38
Light Welterweight (63.5 kg)	11		16		8		4		2			1	42
Welterweight (67 kg)	5		16		8		4		2		1		36
Light Middleweight (71 kg)	4	5		16		8		4	2			1	40
Middleweight (75 kg)	2	16			8		4		2		1		33
Light Heavyweight (80 kg)	3		16			8		4	2			1	34
Cruiserweight (86 kg)	7			8			4		2		1		22
Heavyweight (92 kg)						7	4		2			1	14
Super Heavyweight (+92 kg)	2		6					4	2		1		15
Women
Minimumweight (48 kg)	1				8		4		2		1		16
Light Flyweight (50 kg)	2				8			4	2			1	17
Flyweight (52 kg)		8						4	2		1		15
Bantamweight (54 kg)					8		4		2			1	15
Featherweight (57 kg)		3				8		4	2		1		18
Lightweight (60 kg)	8			8			4		2			1	23
Light Welterweight (63 kg)	2			8			4		2		1		17
Welterweight (66 kg)						6		4	2			1	13
Light Middleweight (70 kg)		6					4		2		1		13
Middleweight (75 kg)		2						4	2			1	9
Light Heavyweight (81 kg)							3		2		1		6
Heavyweight (+81 kg)								3	2			1	6
Total	66	64	70	72	72	53	51	47	50	0	13	12	570

== Medalists ==
=== Men ===
Event	Gold	Silver	Bronze
Minimumweight (48 kg)	Sayfiddin Sabirov; Uzbekistan	Bilalhabasi Nazarov; Azerbaijan	Dias Berikbay; Kazakhstan Othman Chadghour; Morocco
Flyweight (51 kg)	Boranbek Bexultan; Kazakhstan	Justin Munevar; Colombia	Mehdi Kazemi; Iran Zidan Humbatov; Azerbaijan
Bantamweight (54 kg)	Viacheslav Rogozin; Russia	Zhang Hanrui; China	Sobirjon Tastanov; Uzbekistan Amantur Dzhumaev; Kyrgyzstan
Featherweight (57 kg)	Samandar Olimov; Uzbekistan	Yojander Fuentes; Cuba	Zhanser Kosherbayev; Kazakhstan Erik Arstamyan; Armenia
Lightweight (60 kg)	Platon Kozlov; Russia	Yandiel Lozano; Puerto Rico	Mahammadali Gasimzade; Azerbaijan Andranik Martirosyan; Armenia
Light Welterweight (63.5 kg)	Abdulaziz Jurakulov; Uzbekistan	Ali Abdullaev; Azerbaijan	Rafayel Nersisyan; Armenia Djamel Djemmal; France
Welterweight (67 kg)	Torekhan Sabyrkhan; Kazakhstan	David Espinosa; Cuba	Zhang Haosheng; China Juan Flores; Mexico
Light Middleweight (71 kg)	Oner Seiilkhan; Kazakhstan	Aleksei Gukov; Russia	Mukhammadazizbek Ismoilov; Uzbekistan Alperen Yılmaz; Turkey
Middleweight (75 kg)	Sanzhar Begaliyev; Kazakhstan	Djafarbek Shakhbazov; Uzbekistan	Fabian Urbański; Poland Rehemujiang Refukaiti; China
Light Heavyweight (80 kg)	Ruslan Shikhmambetov; Russia	Yolber Bandomo; Spain	Joshua Tonga; New Zealand Semion Boldirev; Bulgaria
Cruiserweight (86 kg)	Akmaljon Isroilov; Uzbekistan	Kamil Dzhamaev; Russia	Shay O'Dowd (IBA) Andrei Rumiantsau; Belarus
Heavyweight (92 kg)	Khalimjon Mamasoliev; Uzbekistan	Amir Reza Malek-Khatabi; Iran	Rassul Assankhanov; Kazakhstan Tynystan Alybaev; Kyrgyzstan
Super Heavyweight (+92 kg)	Adam Olaniyan; Ireland	Shakhzod Polvonov; Uzbekistan	Amir Esmaeili; Iran Aslan Yeldibaiuly; Kazakhstan

=== Women ===
Event	Gold	Silver	Bronze
Minimumweight (48 kg)	Valeria Amparán; Mexico	Jasmin Tokhirova; Uzbekistan	Anel Abdrassilova; Kazakhstan Natalia Niewiadomska; Poland
Light Flyweight (50 kg)	Yelyanur Turganova; Kazakhstan	Carlaigh Peak (IBA)	Maria Georgopoulou; Greece Ramona Manea; Romania
Flyweight (52 kg)	Snezhana Kuznetsova; Russia	Chen Yanfen; China	Nikolina Džida; Serbia Bagzhan Otynbay; Kazakhstan
Bantamweight (54 kg)	Diana Sikstus; Russia	Maloé Teresi; France	Génesis Horta; Venezuela Tang Xuan; China
Featherweight (57 kg)	Wang Miqi; China	Pınar Benek; Turkey	Diana Maestre; Venezuela Aynur Mikayilova; Azerbaijan
Lightweight (60 kg)	Son Su-rim; North Korea	Wu Yuting; China	Molka Khalifi; Tunisia Tolganay Kassymkhan; Kazakhstan
Light Welterweight (63 kg)	Siofra Lawless; Ireland	Pak Sin-a; North Korea	Aruzhan Zhangabayeva; Kazakhstan Ourania Kantzari; Greece
Welterweight (66 kg)	Kyla Doyle; Ireland	Taubay Uldana; Kazakhstan	Shanatibieke Dina; China Amalia Ţugui; Romania
Light Middleweight (70 kg)	Abudureyimu Alimire; China	Yonca Gül Yılmaz; Turkey	Oysha Toirova; Uzbekistan Islem Nadari; Tunisia
Middleweight (75 kg)	Bao Ziyi; China	Nell McLaughlin (IBA)	Shugyla Nalibay; Kazakhstan Dilara Sak; Turkey
Light Heavyweight (81 kg)	Aruzhan Zeinollayeva; Kazakhstan	Rukhshona Parpieva; Uzbekistan	Julia Oleś; Poland Sude Nur Arslan; Turkey
Heavyweight (+81 kg)	Havvanur Kethüda; Turkey	Sobirakhon Shakhobiddinova; Uzbekistan	Panar Seiitkhankyzy; Kazakhstan Sofia Dushina; Russia

== Participating countries ==
595 boxers from 73 countries and IBA Neutral team.

- Afghanistan (3)
- Albania (12)
- Armenia (13)
- Australia (4)
- Azerbaijan (13)
- Belarus (5)
- Belgium (4)
- Bolivia (2)
- Bosnia and Herzegovina (4)
- Brazil (5)
- Bulgaria (9)
- Chile (3)
- China (22)
- Colombia (12)
- Croatia (12)
- Cuba (8)
- Cyprus (1)
- Czech Republic (4)
- Democratic Republic of the Congo (5)
- Ecuador (6)
- Estonia (5)
- France (5)
- French Polynesia (4)
- Georgia (8)
- Germany (7)
- Ghana (6)
- Greece (12)
- Guinea (2)
- Hong Kong (3)
- Hungary (13)
- IBA Neutral (11)
- Iran (4)
- Ireland (8)
- Israel (7)
- Kazakhstan (25)
- Kosovo (4)
- Kyrgyzstan (14)
- Latvia (1)
- Lesotho (4)
- Lithuania (10)
- Malta (1)
- Mexico (21)
- Moldova (12)
- Montenegro (2)
- Morocco (17)
- Nepal (3)
- New Zealand (1)
- North Korea (4)
- North Macedonia (8)
- Pakistan (1)
- Palestine (1)
- Paraguay (1)
- Poland (20)
- Portugal (3)
- Puerto Rico (11)
- Romania (21)
- Russia (25)
- Saint Lucia (2)
- Samoa (1)
- Serbia (10)
- Seychelles (2)
- Sierra Leone (3)
- Slovakia (6)
- Slovenia (10)
- South Africa (5)
- Spain (9)
- Tajikistan (9)
- Trinidad and Tobago (6)
- Tunisia (10)
- Turkey (23)
- Turkmenistan (8)
- Uzbekistan (23)
- Venezuela (13)
- Zimbabwe (3)

== Draw sheets ==
=== Men's Minimumweight (48 kg) ===
First round
A Bozkaya (IBA)	3
A Chisari (GER)	2
T Taalaibek Uulu (KGZ)	0
B Nazarov (AZE)	5
Hu JH (CHN)	4
A Cenușă (MDA)	1
V Keyan (ARM)	2
O Chadghour (MAR)	3
Kim K-i (PRK)	4
I Kurbachev (RUS)	1
S Sabirov (UZB)	RSC
L Sulaj (ALB)
M Muminov (TJK)	1
I Maghraoui (ESP)	4
K Betancourt (VEN)	0
D Berikbay (KAZ)	5

Second round
A Bozkaya (IBA)	0
Á Sober (CUB)	5
B Nazarov (AZE)	5
C Bonilla (ECU)	0
Hu JH (CHN)	3
M Gvasalia (GEO)	2
O Chadghour (MAR)	5
Y Morales (PUR)	0
Kim K-i (PRK)	5
G Dowuona (GHA)	0
S Sabirov (UZB)	4
M Valdez (MEX)	1
I Maghraoui (ESP)	5
S Hamraýew (TKM)	0
D Berikbay (KAZ)	4
N Maksimović (SRB)	1

Quarterfinals
Á Sober (CUB)	1
B Nazarov (AZE)	4
Hu JH (CHN)	1
O Chadghour (MAR)	4
Kim K-i (PRK)	0
S Sabirov (UZB)	5
I Maghraoui (ESP)	2
D Berikbay (KAZ)	3

Semifinals
B Nazarov (AZE)	5
O Chadghour (MAR)	0
S Sabirov (UZB)	5
D Berikbay (KAZ)	0

Final
B Nazarov (AZE)	0
S Sabirov (UZB)	5

=== Men's Flyweight (51 kg) ===
First round
S Xixi (ALB)	0
M Sufijonov (TJK)	5
N Chivu (ROU)	2
Song BW (CHN)	3

Second round
M Sufijonov (TJK)	5
W Solórzano (VEN)	0
K Skulčas (LTU)	RSC
F Alvarado (BOL)
M Szczoczarz (POL)	3
J Fuentes (MEX)	2
Z Humbatov (AZE)	RSC
A Aizak Mavrommatis (GRE)
Ş Artykbaýew (TKM)	0
F Boussaa (TUN)	5
M Ybyraimakunov (KGZ)	3
T Akkaş (TUR)	0
Y Pérez (PUR)	0
J Munevar (COL)	5
G Elizbaryan (GEO)	1
A Boudankit (MAR)	4
Song BW (CHN)	2
A Abdunazarov (UZB)	3
C Cruzat (CHI)	0
A Rebediuk (RUS)	5
M Cernelea (MDA)	3
A Rana (NEP)	0
S Pambeni (ZIM)
B Bexultan (KAZ)	WO
S Kabia (SLE)
E Hamdam (AFG)	WO
M Tayber (ISR)	1
M Ashitey (GHA)	4
M Kazemi (IRI)	RSC
B Mamutovski (MKD)
S Colcha (ECU)	2
F Chaves (BRA)	3

Third round
M Sufijonov (TJK)	KO
K Skulčas (LTU)
M Szczoczarz (POL)	0
Z Humbatov (AZE)	5
F Boussaa (TUN)	0
M Ybyraimakunov (KGZ)	5
J Munevar (COL)	5
A Boudankit (MAR)	0
A Abdunazarov (UZB)	2
A Rebediuk (RUS)	3
M Cernelea (MDA)	0
B Bexultan (KAZ)	5
E Hamdam (AFG)	3
M Ashitey (GHA)	2
M Kazemi (IRI)	5
F Chaves (BRA)	0

Quarterfinals
M Sufijonov (TJK)	2
Z Humbatov (AZE)	3
M Ybyraimakunov (KGZ)	0
J Munevar (COL)	5
A Rebediuk (RUS)	0
B Bexultan (KAZ)	5
E Hamdam (AFG)	0
M Kazemi (IRI)	5

Semifinals
Z Humbatov (AZE)	1
J Munevar (COL)	4
B Bexultan (KAZ)	5
M Kazemi (IRI)	0

Final
J Munevar (COL)	0
B Bexultan (KAZ)	5

=== Men's Bantamweight (54 kg) ===
First round
M Moyo (ZIM)
A Avetikyan (ARM)	WO
J Oropeza (VEN)	5
T Alvanos (GRE)	0

Second round
A Avetikyan (ARM)	4
I Lapchevskyi (ISR)	1
R Sosa (PUR)	1
K Dallagi (TUN)	4
A Dzhumaev (KGZ)	RSC
T Jakomini (SLO)
I Rincón (COL)	RSC
E Dalmis (TUR)
S McCusker (IBA)	4
G Torres (BRA)	1
M Jamai (MAR)	0
Zhang HR (CHN)	5
M Şadurdyýew (TKM)	2
A Dinkov (BUL)	3
K Kozák (HUN)	4
J Pastrano (ECU)	1
J Oropeza (VEN)	0
B Muratov (KAZ)	5
O Aslanli (AZE)	5
K Sánchez (CUB)	0
O Grodzicki (POL)	0
S Tastanov (UZB)	5
R Mokhitli (LES)
A Fazylov (TJK)	RSC
I Peni (MDA)	RSC
M Alimi (MKD)
M Djemmal (FRA)	5
B Venture (BEL)	0
R Mendoza (MEX)	5
A Diallo (GUI)	0
F Stroe (ROU)
V Rogozin (RUS)	RSC

Third round
A Avetikyan (ARM)	0
K Dallagi (TUN)	5
A Dzhumaev (KGZ)	RSC
I Rincón (COL)
S McCusker (IBA)
Zhang HR (CHN)	RSC
A Dinkov (BUL)	0
K Kozák (HUN)	5
B Muratov (KAZ)	1
O Aslanli (AZE)	4
S Tastanov (UZB)	5
A Fazylov (TJK)	0
I Peni (MDA)	0
M Djemmal (FRA)	5
R Mendoza (MEX)	0
V Rogozin (RUS)	5

Quarterfinals
K Dallagi (TUN)	0
A Dzhumaev (KGZ)	5
Zhang HR (CHN)	5
K Kozák (HUN)	0
O Aslanli (AZE)	0
S Tastanov (UZB)	5
M Djemmal (FRA)
V Rogozin (RUS)	RSC

Semifinals
A Dzhumaev (KGZ)	1
Zhang HR (CHN)	4
S Tastanov (UZB)	0
V Rogozin (RUS)	4

Final
Zhang HR (CHN)
V Rogozin (RUS)	RSC

=== Men's Featherweight (57 kg) ===
First round
D Nieves (PUR)	5
F Quartey (GHA)	0
A Rustemovski (MKD)	WO
M Tsimbombo (COD)
C Tamang (NEP)	2
M Grigorianas (LTU)	3
E Arstamyan (ARM)	4
D Mushkudiani (GEO)	1
A Lopes (BRA)
A Dimitrov (BUL)	RSC
Ri H (PRK)	RSC
Leong KH (HKG)
N Mihailović (SLO)	4
M Neraj (TTO)	1
V Melenchuk (MDA)	3
M El-Jebsi (TUN)	2

Second round
D Nieves (PUR)	1
G Pleas (GRE)	4
Y Fuentes (CUB)	5
P D'Apollo (VEN)	0
A Rustemovski (MKD)	1
I Ibragimov (RUS)	4
J Ferreira (POR)	0
D Balko (GER)	5
M Grigorianas (LTU)	5
P Joković (BIH)	0
P Benedek (HUN)	1
T Nasibov (AZE)	4
E Arstamyan (ARM)	RSC
T Zelenák (SVK)
Ç Fidan (TUR)	5
S Chakli (MAR)	0
A Dimitrov (BUL)	3
N Sultanov (KGZ)	2
Y Zúñiga (COL)	1
S Olimov (UZB)	4
Ri H (PRK)	5
L Xhoxhaj (KOS)	0
H Carbajal (MEX)	0
J Graham (IRL)	5
N Mihailović (SLO)	0
Z Kosherbayev (KAZ)	5
Liu ZK (CHN)	0
S Davlatov (TJK)	3
V Melenchuk (MDA)	0
B Hekuri (ALB)	5
I Gurbanberdiýew (TKM)	5
R Budikov (EST)	0

Third round
G Pleas (GRE)
Y Fuentes (CUB)	RSC-I
I Ibragimov (RUS)	DSQ
D Balko (GER)
M Grigorianas (LTU)
T Nasibov (AZE)	RSC
E Arstamyan (ARM)	RSC
Ç Fidan (TUR)
A Dimitrov (BUL)	0
S Olimov (UZB)	5
Ri H (PRK)	0
J Graham (IRL)	5
Z Kosherbayev (KAZ)	RSC
S Davlatov (TJK)
B Hekuri (ALB)	1
I Gurbanberdiýew (TKM)	4

Quarterfinals
Y Fuentes (CUB)	5
I Ibragimov (RUS)	0
T Nasibov (AZE)	2
E Arstamyan (ARM)	3
S Olimov (UZB)	5
J Graham (IRL)	0
Z Kosherbayev (KAZ)	5
I Gurbanberdiýew (TKM)	0

Semifinals
Y Fuentes (CUB)	3
E Arstamyan (ARM)	2
S Olimov (UZB)	5
Z Kosherbayev (KAZ)	0

Final
Y Fuentes (CUB)	2
S Olimov (UZB)	3

=== Men's Lightweight (60 kg) ===
First round
N Stanišauskas (LTU)	0
S Azimi (AFG)	5
A Mairanbekov (KGZ)	0
A Khavantsev (KAZ)	5
D Mbaya (COD)
N Kalyvakis (GRE)	WO
D Balko (GER)
A Martirosyan (ARM)	KO
E Ankrah (GHA)	4
M Marton (CRO)	1
V Scalco (ROU)	0
V Iliev (BUL)	5
G Santana (BRA)	0
A Gongqa (RSA)	5

Second round
S Azimi (AFG)
Y Lozano (PUR)	KO
İA Bakır (TUR)
A Lanzarote (ESP)	RSC
A Khavantsev (KAZ)	1
N Allaberganov (UZB)	4
D Sinaswee (TTO)	WO
D Gomes (POR)
N Kalyvakis (GRE)	0
S Hmamouche (MAR)	5
I Krivačević (SRB)	0
A Maca (ALB)	5
A Martirosyan (ARM)	RSC
M Sabyrow (TKM)
F Kamanin (EST)	RSC
Ning CK (HKG)
E Ankrah (GHA)	2
H Santos (MEX)	3
O Pérez (COL)	0
M Gasimzade (AZE)	5
V Iliev (BUL)	5
E Cassiani (VEN)	0
D Frank (HUN)	0
S Spica (FRA)	5
A Gongqa (RSA)	RSC
N Simanschi (MDA)
I Soczówka (POL)	0
D Muibalikhonov (TJK)	5
Wang YH (CHN)	0
M McDonagh (IRL)	5
M Taidi (BEL)	0
P Kozlov (RUS)	5

Third round
Y Lozano (PUR)	3
A Lanzarote (ESP)	2
N Allaberganov (UZB)	RSC
D Sinaswee (TTO)
S Hmamouche (MAR)
A Maca (ALB)	RSC
A Martirosyan (ARM)	5
F Kamanin (EST)	0
H Santos (MEX)	1
M Gasimzade (AZE)	4
V Iliev (BUL)	1
S Spica (FRA)	4
A Gongqa (RSA)	2
D Muibalikhonov (TJK)	3
M McDonagh (IRL)	0
P Kozlov (RUS)	5

Quarterfinals
Y Lozano (PUR)	4
N Allaberganov (UZB)	1
A Maca (ALB)	2
A Martirosyan (ARM)	3
M Gasimzade (AZE)	5
S Spica (FRA)	0
D Muibalikhonov (TJK)	0
P Kozlov (RUS)	5

Semifinals
Y Lozano (PUR)	5
A Martirosyan (ARM)	0
M Gasimzade (AZE)	0
P Kozlov (RUS)	5

Final
Y Lozano (PUR)	0
P Kozlov (RUS)	5

=== Men's Light Welterweight (63.5 kg) ===
First round
L Demurovi (GEO)	5
A Mirahmadi (IRI)	0
O Wanga (RSA)
E Fotiadis (GRE)	RSC
S Lala (ALB)	1
A Abdullaev (AZE)	4
A Quintana (MEX)	4
B García (VEN)	1
W Konszewicz (POL)	DSQ
M Jukić (CRO)
Chen M (CHN)	1
D Ramírez (COL)	4
R Nersisyan (ARM)	5
O Belekbaev (KGZ)	0
A Tolstoi (MDA)	5
L Ankrah (GHA)	0
I Makarov (EST)	5
W Martínez (PUR)	0
A Jumamyradow (TKM)	0
B Ndjibu (COD)	5
A Jurakulov (UZB)	RSC
K Atger (PYF)

Second round
L Demurovi (GEO)	0
Y Tejera (CUB)	3
E Fotiadis (GRE)	RSC
A Bojić (SLO)
A Abdullaev (AZE)	4
M Sugaipov (RUS)	1
A Ussen (KAZ)	0
R Gafurov (TJK)	4
A Quintana (MEX)	RSC
Wong KL (HKG)
W Konszewicz (POL)	5
A Mailát (HUN)	0
D Ramírez (COL)	RSC
A Vella (MLT)
J Le (AUS)	0
D Djemmal (FRA)	5
R Nersisyan (ARM)	4
A Choukry (MAR)	0
A Tolstoi (MDA)	5
I Hypolite (TTO)	0
I Makarov (EST)
R Jenkins (IRL)	RSC
A Rahal (ISR)	WO
L Sulejmani (MKD)
B Ndjibu (COD)	5
M Čičmanec (SVK)	0
M Cardona (BOL)
D Grigorie (ROU)	RSC-I
A Jurakulov (UZB)	5
O Antić (SRB)	0
Y Dhaouadi (TUN)	0
R Kartal (TUR)	5

Third round
Y Tejera (CUB)	1
E Fotiadis (GRE)	3
A Abdullaev (AZE)	5
R Gafurov (TJK)	0
A Quintana (MEX)	2
W Konszewicz (POL)	3
D Ramírez (COL)	1
D Djemmal (FRA)	4
R Nersisyan (ARM)	5
A Tolstoi (MDA)	0
R Jenkins (IRL)	1
A Rahal (ISR)	4
B Ndjibu (COD)	0
D Grigorie (ROU)	4
A Jurakulov (UZB)	5
R Kartal (TUR)	0

Quarterfinals
E Fotiadis (GRE)	0
A Abdullaev (AZE)	5
W Konszewicz (POL)	2
D Djemmal (FRA)	3
R Nersisyan (ARM)	5
A Rahal (ISR)	0
D Grigorie (ROU)	0
A Jurakulov (UZB)	5

Semifinals
A Abdullaev (AZE)	4
D Djemmal (FRA)	1
R Nersisyan (ARM)	0
A Jurakulov (UZB)	5

Final
A Abdullaev (AZE)
A Jurakulov (UZB)	RSC

=== Men's Welterweight (67 kg) ===
First round
M Roganović (MNE)	5
H Dimitrov (SRB)	0
A Ahmadov (UZB)	KO
A Pacheco (VEN)
E Yanfu (COD)	5
C Rodrigues (BRA)	0
A Nedanovski (AUS)	0
M Sultonov (TJK)	5
R Krepštul (LTU)
A Tudoroiu (ROU)	RSC

Second round
M Roganović (MNE)
T Sabyrkhan (KAZ)	WO
S Hamdam (AFG)	5
N Smirnov (GER)	0
A Ahmadov (UZB)	4
E Abdulaevi (GEO)	1
A Quiñones (PUR)	0
M Berend (CRO)	5
E Yanfu (COD)	3
D Bermúdez (COL)	2
R Kadyrov (KGZ)	0
Zhang HS (CHN)	5
B Edward (IBA)	RSC-I
M Karnaba (CYP)
B Karaj (ALB)	RSC
D Venasio (SAM)
M Sultonov (TJK)	RSC
G Valdovinos (PAR)
L Trifunovik (MKD)	0
D Guranda (MDA)	5
Y Berchami (MAR)	RSC
A Reid (TTO)
B Dakaev (RUS)	0
D Espinosa (CUB)	5
A Tudoroiu (ROU)	4
A Hakobyan (ARM)	0
A Warwar (ISR)	RSC
L Filip (CZE)
J Flores (MEX)	5
H Babat (TUR)	0
Y Harbachou (BLR)	5
M Diallo (GUI)	0

Third round
T Sabyrkhan (KAZ)	5
S Hamdam (AFG)	0
A Ahmadov (UZB)	RSC-I
M Berend (CRO)
E Yanfu (COD)
Zhang HS (CHN)	RSC
B Edward (IBA)	0
B Karaj (ALB)	4
M Sultonov (TJK)	1
D Guranda (MDA)	4
Y Berchami (MAR)	0
D Espinosa (CUB)	5
A Tudoroiu (ROU)	5
A Warwar (ISR)	0
J Flores (MEX)	RSC
Y Harbachou (BLR)

Quarterfinals
T Sabyrkhan (KAZ)	5
A Ahmadov (UZB)	0
Zhang HS (CHN)	5
B Karaj (ALB)	0
D Guranda (MDA)
D Espinosa (CUB)	KO
A Tudoroiu (ROU)	2
J Flores (MEX)	3

Semifinals
T Sabyrkhan (KAZ)	5
Zhang HS (CHN)	0
D Espinosa (CUB)	5
J Flores (MEX)	0

Final
T Sabyrkhan (KAZ)	4
D Espinosa (CUB)	1

=== Men's Light Middleweight (71 kg) ===
First round
G Zaprinov (BUL)
T O'Donnell (IRL)	RSC
J Sáez (ESP)	1
M Ismoilov (UZB)	4
R Marín (MEX)	4
D Pešek (CZE)	1
L Lerotholi (LES)	0
A Koçi (ALB)	5
I Siniak (BLR)	3
D Pappoe (GHA)	2
A Tandler (SLO)	0
A Bablumyan (ARM)	5
M Almonacid (CHI)
N Stojanoski (MKD)	RSC
M Odinokov (EST)
M Harnoune (MAR)	KO
Z Hasanov (AZE)	DSQ
P Newallo (TTO)

Second round
T O'Donnell (IRL)	1
J Franco (COL)	4
M Ismoilov (UZB)	WO
S Sesay (SLE)
R Marín (MEX)	4
H Rasljanin (SRB)	0
B Hatamov (TJK)	RSC
B Nziyana (RSA)
A Koçi (ALB)	5
Zhao SW (CHN)	0
R Hanisko (SVK)	0
Ș Stavri (ROU)	5
I Siniak (BLR)	0
O Seiilkhan (KAZ)	5
A Hicks (AUS)
M Shahzad (PAK)	RSC
A Bablumyan (ARM)	5
B Środa (POL)	0
I Khlifi (BEL)	1
V Abramovas (LTU)	4
N Stojanoski (MKD)
A Yılmaz (TUR)	RSC
A Petrovics (LAT)
J Tenorio (ECU)	RSC
M Harnoune (MAR)	0
A Gukov (RUS)	5
I Moshe (ISR)	5
L Pavlić (CRO)	0
Z Hasanov (AZE)	0
I Bondar (MDA)	5
T Martins (POR)	1
J Pizarro (PUR)	4

Third round
J Franco (COL)
M Ismoilov (UZB)	RSC
R Marín (MEX)	1
B Hatamov (TJK)	3
A Koçi (ALB)	5
Ș Stavri (ROU)	0
O Seiilkhan (KAZ)	RSC
M Shahzad (PAK)
A Bablumyan (ARM)	5
V Abramovas (LTU)	0
A Yılmaz (TUR)	5
J Tenorio (ECU)	0
A Gukov (RUS)	5
I Moshe (ISR)	0
I Bondar (MDA)	3
J Pizarro (PUR)	2

Quarterfinals
M Ismoilov (UZB)	5
B Hatamov (TJK)	0
A Koçi (ALB)	0
O Seiilkhan (KAZ)	5
A Bablumyan (ARM)	1
A Yılmaz (TUR)	4
A Gukov (RUS)	RSC
I Bondar (MDA)

Semifinals
M Ismoilov (UZB)	1
O Seiilkhan (KAZ)	4
A Yılmaz (TUR)	0
A Gukov (RUS)	5

Final
O Seiilkhan (KAZ)	5
A Gukov (RUS)	0

=== Men's Middleweight (75 kg) ===
First round
M Ben Zid (TUN)	0
A Shadlinski (AZE)	5
Z Qosimov (TJK)	0
A Matskevich (BLR)	3

Second round
A Shadlinski (AZE)	0
G Natroshvili (GEO)	5
Y Bakhi (BEL)	4
V Vukajlović (SRB)	1
D Shakhbazov (UZB)	RSC
M Guillemet (PYF)
D Vasiliauskas (LTU)	5
K Marcel (LCA)	0
A Harutyunyan (ARM)	RSC
A Taro (SVK)
R Kronewald (GER)	0
R Refukaiti (CHN)	5
J Córdoba (COL)	5
G Gojkovič (SLO)	0
EA Altun (TUR)	0
J Micock (SEY)	5
A Matskevich (BLR)	3
B Beyer (MEX)	2
D Đukić (CRO)
F Urbański (POL)	RSC
A Jabarin (ISR)	5
V Dorogan (MDA)	0
S Rakhmanberdiev (KGZ)
K Nileborg (HUN)	RSC
A Murtazaliev (RUS)	5
I Kouriba (MAR)	0
Y Abreu (CUB)	5
A Koçi (ALB)	0
S Begaliyev (KAZ)	5
I Szűcs (ROU)	0
S Hashem (BUL)	RSC-I
L Morina (KOS)

Third round
G Natroshvili (GEO)	4
Y Bakhi (BEL)	0
D Shakhbazov (UZB)	RSC
D Vasiliauskas (LTU)
A Harutyunyan (ARM)	1
R Refukaiti (CHN)	4
J Córdoba (COL)	0
J Micock (SEY)	5
A Matskevich (BLR)	0
F Urbański (POL)	5
A Jabarin (ISR)	4
K Nileborg (HUN)	1
A Murtazaliev (RUS)	0
Y Abreu (CUB)	5
S Begaliyev (KAZ)	5
S Hashem (BUL)	0

Quarterfinals
G Natroshvili (GEO)	0
D Shakhbazov (UZB)	4
R Refukaiti (CHN)	RSC
J Micock (SEY)
F Urbański (POL)	5
A Jabarin (ISR)	0
Y Abreu (CUB)	1
S Begaliyev (KAZ)	4

Semifinals
D Shakhbazov (UZB)	RSC
R Refukaiti (CHN)
F Urbański (POL)	2
S Begaliyev (KAZ)	3

Final
D Shakhbazov (UZB)	0
S Begaliyev (KAZ)	5

=== Men's Light Heavyweight (80 kg) ===
First round
E Mușet (ROU)	4
Suo ZN (CHN)	1
L Xhongoli (ALB)	0
J Tonga (NZL)	5
M Zakirov (KGZ)	5
J Michelena (VEN)	0

Second round
E Mușet (ROU)	5
K Harbatsenka (BLR)	0
R Shikhmambetov (RUS)	5
N Baramidze (GEO)	0
M Aybuğa (TUR)	WO
T Bafor (SLE)
J Mehriddinov (UZB)	5
M Bexultanov (KAZ)	0
J Tonga (NZL)	RSC
J Didier (LCA)
S Váradi (HUN)	5
L Rodríguez (MEX)	0
W Jean (SEY)
F Klepo (MNE)	RSC
A Poghosyan (ARM)	5
J Ortíz (CHI)	0
M Zakirov (KGZ)	RSC
M Moisejenko (LTU)
I Jukičić (CRO)	2
P Zadorojnii (MDA)	3
Y Bandomo (ESP)	ABD
B Aeti (MKD)
Z Shkokani (PLE)	0
J Salas (COL)	5
I Rondoś (POL)	5
A Yklymow (TKM)	0
J Lewis (TTO)
N Šepic (SLO)	RSC
P Corduff (IBA)	3
H Selimović (BIH)	2
J Mayeta (CUB)	2
S Boldirev (BUL)	3

Third round
E Mușet (ROU)
R Shikhmambetov (RUS)	RSC
M Aybuğa (TUR)	1
J Mehriddinov (UZB)	4
J Tonga (NZL)	4
S Váradi (HUN)	0
F Klepo (MNE)
A Poghosyan (ARM)	RSC
M Zakirov (KGZ)	RSC
P Zadorojnii (MDA)
Y Bandomo (ESP)	5
J Salas (COL)	0
I Rondoś (POL)	5
N Šepic (SLO)	0
P Corduff (IBA)	0
S Boldirev (BUL)	5

Quarterfinals
R Shikhmambetov (RUS)	5
J Mehriddinov (UZB)	0
J Tonga (NZL)	RSC
A Poghosyan (ARM)
M Zakirov (KGZ)	1
Y Bandomo (ESP)	3
I Rondoś (POL)
S Boldirev (BUL)	RSC

Semifinals
R Shikhmambetov (RUS)	5
J Tonga (NZL)	0
Y Bandomo (ESP)	RSC
S Boldirev (BUL)

Final
R Shikhmambetov (RUS)	4
Y Bandomo (ESP)	1

=== Men's Cruiserweight (86 kg) ===
First round
Á Rivera (PUR)	5
P Kalogeras (GRE)	0
S Kazaryan (GEO)	4
T Yimiren (CHN)	1
A Isroilov (UZB)	5
A Figura (POL)	0
G Buleu (ROU)	0
A Prilutsky (ISR)	5
S Petrov (BUL)	RSC
Z Azizov (MDA)
A Rumiantsau (BLR)	5
B Aiytmukhanov (KAZ)	0
HE Tekdemir (TUR)	0
J Rawlins (CUB)	5

Second round
Á Rivera (PUR)
S O'Dowd (IBA)	RSC
S Kazaryan (GEO)	RSC
R Gurra (ALB)
A Isroilov (UZB)	RSC
S Tomić (SRB)
A Prilutsky (ISR)	3
J Tokić (CRO)	2
S Petrov (BUL)	5
R Escareño (MEX)	0
A Rumiantsau (BLR)	5
K Lisi (MKD)	0
J Rawlins (CUB)	RSC
B Mešalić (BIH)
K Dzhamaev (RUS)	5
A Choibekov (KGZ)	0

Quarterfinals
S O'Dowd (IBA)	RSC
S Kazaryan (GEO)
A Isroilov (UZB)	5
A Prilutsky (ISR)	0
S Petrov (BUL)	0
A Rumiantsau (BLR)	5
J Rawlins (CUB)	2
K Dzhamaev (RUS)	3

Semifinals
S O'Dowd (IBA)
A Isroilov (UZB)	WO
A Rumiantsau (BLR)
K Dzhamaev (RUS)	WO

Final
A Isroilov (UZB)	5
K Dzhamaev (RUS)	0

=== Men's Heavyweight (92 kg) ===
First round
N Demenev (MDA)
Z Zirdum (CRO)	RSC
T Alybaev (KGZ)	RSC
M Muhammetdurdyýew (TKM)
TT Tarhan (TUR)
A Malek-Khatabi (IRI)	RSC
O Kliuchagin (RUS)	5
R Bachevski (BUL)	0
D Simonyan (ARM)	0
K Mamasoliev (UZB)	5
T Stokes (IBA)	3
M Mészáros (HUN)	1
A Żuk (POL)	0
Chao K (CHN)	5

Quarterfinals
Z Zirdum (CRO)
T Alybaev (KGZ)	RSC
A Malek-Khatabi (IRI)	4
O Kliuchagin (RUS)	1
K Mamasoliev (UZB)	RSC
T Stokes (IBA)
Chao K (CHN)	0
R Assankhanov (KAZ)	4

Semifinals
T Alybaev (KGZ)
A Malek-Khatabi (IRI)	RSC
K Mamasoliev (UZB)	5
R Assankhanov (KAZ)	0

Final
A Malek-Khatabi (IRI)	2
K Mamasoliev (UZB)	3

=== Men's Super Heavyweight (+92 kg) ===
First round
S Šalamon (SVK)
A Esmaeili (IRI)	RSC
E Domi (ALB)
B Mildzikhov (RUS)	RSC
V Sejdić (CRO)	0
B Németh (HUN)	5
A Olaniyan (IRL)	RSC-I
E Contreras (MEX)
Zhang D (CHN)
A Yeldibaiuly (KAZ)	KO
A Pozder (BIH)	0
M Koshaliev (KGZ)	5
S Polvonov (UZB)	5
K Zakrzewski (POL)	0
M Tepanyan (ARM)	WO
A Dragaš (SLO)

Quarterfinals
A Esmaeili (IRI)	4
B Mildzikhov (RUS)	1
B Németh (HUN)	0
A Olaniyan (IRL)	5
A Yeldibaiuly (KAZ)	4
M Koshaliev (KGZ)	0
S Polvonov (UZB)	5
M Tepanyan (ARM)	0

Semifinals
A Esmaeili (IRI)	0
A Olaniyan (IRL)	5
A Yeldibaiuly (KAZ)	1
S Polvonov (UZB)	4

Final
A Olaniyan (IRL)	5
S Polvonov (UZB)	0

=== Women's Minimumweight (48 kg) ===
First round
A Trifylli (GRE)	3
Y Baltacı (TUR)	2

Second round
A Trifylli (GRE)	2
N Niewiadomska (POL)	3
L Lanza (ECU)	3
C Alcañiz (ESP)	2
L Madatova (AZE)	0
M Fragnieres (FRA)	5
D Zrianina (RUS)	0
J Tokhirova (UZB)	5
A Abdrassilova (KAZ)	3
T Murphy (IBA)	2
Y Annabe (MAR)
J Herrera (COL)	RSC-I
S Meltzer (ROU)
Zeng WM (CHN)	RSC
R Talpas (HUN)
V Amparán (MEX)	RSC

Quarterfinals
N Niewiadomska (POL)	5
L Lanza (ECU)	0
M Fragnieres (FRA)	1
J Tokhirova (UZB)	4
A Abdrassilova (KAZ)	5
J Herrera (COL)	0
Zeng WM (CHN)	0
V Amparán (MEX)	5

Semifinals
N Niewiadomska (POL)	2
J Tokhirova (UZB)	3
A Abdrassilova (KAZ)
V Amparán (MEX)	RCS

Final
J Tokhirova (UZB)	1
V Amparán (MEX)	4

=== Women's Light Flyweight (50 kg) ===
First round
J Ramírez (PUR)	0
R Sánchez (ESP)	5
E Kılınç (TUR)	3
J Sultanli (AZE)	2

Second round
R Sánchez (ESP)	2
R Manea (ROU)	3
M Altaravičiūtė (LTU)	0
H Petrosyan (ARM)	5
F Abdeljaouad (MAR)	0
H Tlili (TUN)	5
V Krainova (RUS)	1
C Peak (IBA)	4
E Kılınç (TUR)
Y Turganova (KAZ)	RSC
Xi QX (CHN)	2
Z Yusufova (UZB)	3
N Formela (POL)	2
T Reyes (MEX)	3
M Georgopoulou (GRE)	5
S Mitić (SRB)	0

Quarterfinals
R Manea (ROU)	5
H Petrosyan (ARM)	0
H Tlili (TUN)	0
C Peak (IBA)	5
Y Turganova (KAZ)	5
Z Yusufova (UZB)	0
T Reyes (MEX)	1
M Georgopoulou (GRE)	4

Semifinals
R Manea (ROU)	0
C Peak (IBA)	5
Y Turganova (KAZ)	5
M Georgopoulou (GRE)	0

Final
C Peak (IBA)	0
Y Turganova (KAZ)	5

=== Women's Flyweight (52 kg) ===
First round
L Petrache (ROU)	3
E Kumar (AUS)	1
M Turgunova (UZB)
Chen YF (CHN)	RSC
L Armas (ECU)
V Muñoz (MEX)	WO
B Otynbay (KAZ)	5
MN Efe (TUR)	0
N Mbatha (RSA)
S Kuznetsova (RUS)	RSC
M Koczkodaj (POL)	5
A Eddanguir (MAR)	0
N Džida (SRB)	3
S Nyögéri (HUN)	2
N Gutiérrez (ESP)	RSC
K Vesselova (EST)

Quarterfinals
L Petrache (ROU)
Chen YF (CHN)	RSC
V Muñoz (MEX)
B Otynbay (KAZ)	RSC
S Kuznetsova (RUS)	3
M Koczkodaj (POL)	2
N Džida (SRB)	3
N Gutiérrez (ESP)	2

Semifinals
Chen YF (CHN)	4
B Otynbay (KAZ)	1
S Kuznetsova (RUS)	5
N Džida (SRB)	0

Final
Chen YF (CHN)	0
S Kuznetsova (RUS)	5

=== Women's Bantamweight (54 kg) ===
First round
Tang X (CHN)	RSC
NN Yıldırım (TUR)
A Kuçi (ALB)
D Ramírez (MEX)	RSC
L Avetisyan (ARM)	2
E Mosquera (COL)	3
M Teresi (FRA)	5
M Vergetaki (GRE)	0
D Sikstus (RUS)	4
A Sydyk (KAZ)	1
K Pambu (COD)	0
F Sharipova (UZB)	5
A Sizonenko (KGZ)
V Moroşanu (ROU)	RSC
J El-Mokhtari (MAR)	0
G Horta (VEN)	5

Quarterfinals
Tang X (CHN)	RSC
D Ramírez (MEX)
E Mosquera (COL)	0
M Teresi (FRA)	5
D Sikstus (RUS)	5
F Sharipova (UZB)	0
V Moroşanu (ROU)
G Horta (VEN)	RSC

Semifinals
Tang X (CHN)	0
M Teresi (FRA)	5
D Sikstus (RUS)	3
G Horta (VEN)	2

Final
M Teresi (FRA)	1
D Sikstus (RUS)	4

=== Women's Featherweight (57 kg) ===
First round
M Abyldaeva (KGZ)	5
V Hovorková (CZE)	0
A Yermek (KAZ)	5
N Vicente (ESP)	0
S Kulaeva (RUS)	4
G Ben Hmaid (TUN)	1

Second round
M Abyldaeva (KGZ)
P Kouzilou (GRE)	RSC
Wang MQ (CHN)	5
L Paljušić (CRO)	0
A Yermek (KAZ)	2
D Maestre (VEN)	3
D García (MEX)	4
J Balakazi (ZIM)	0
S Kulaeva (RUS)	5
N Jasiak (POL)	0
N Keogh (IBA)	0
P Benek (TUR)	5
R Segoete (LES)
S Varga (HUN)	RSC
G Cioroba (ROU)
A Mikayilova (AZE)	RSC

Quarterfinals
P Kouzilou (GRE)	0
Wang MQ (CHN)	5
D Maestre (VEN)	5
D García (MEX)	0
S Kulaeva (RUS)	2
P Benek (TUR)	3
S Varga (HUN)
A Mikayilova (AZE)	RSC

Semifinals
Wang MQ (CHN)	RSC
D Maestre (VEN)
P Benek (TUR)	4
A Mikayilova (AZE)	1

Final
Wang MQ (CHN)	3
P Benek (TUR)	2

=== Women's Lightweight (60 kg) ===
First round
ZS Comart (TUR)	0
Son S-r (PRK)	5
C Carnerero (ESP)	2
F Corona (MEX)	3
K Ivanovová (CZE)	1
S Molchanova (RUS)	4
A Kopše (SLO)
G Isgandar (AZE)	WO
Wu YT (CHN)	3
E Lux (GER)	2
A Dudău (ROU)	RSC
O Xhakli (KOS)
M Youli (VEN)	0
T Kassymkhan (KAZ)	5
D Bouhrir (MAR)	5
A Mjiyakho (RSA)	0

Second round
Son S-r (PRK)	5
D Zenounllari (GRE)	0
F Corona (MEX)	RSC
N Gurung (NEP)
S Molchanova (RUS)	RSC
H Nena (PYF)
G Isgandar (AZE)
M Khalifi (TUN)	RSC
Wu YT (CHN)	RSC
K Whelan (IRL)
A Dudău (ROU)	5
N Rába (HUN)	0
T Kassymkhan (KAZ)	3
R Bekniyazova (UZB)	2
D Bouhrir (MAR)	1
B Savickaitė (LTU)	4

Quarterfinals
Son S-r (PRK)	5
F Corona (MEX)	0
S Molchanova (RUS)	2
M Khalifi (TUN)	3
Wu YT (CHN)	5
A Dudău (ROU)	0
T Kassymkhan (KAZ)	5
B Savickaitė (LTU)	0

Semifinals
Son S-r (PRK)	5
M Khalifi (TUN)	0
Wu YT (CHN)	4
T Kassymkhan (KAZ)	1

Final
Son S-r (PRK)	3
Wu YT (CHN)	2

=== Women's Light Welterweight (63 kg) ===
First round
A Zhangabayeva (KAZ)	4
M Dzugaeva (RUS)	0
N Nikolov (SLO)	5
V Vélez (PUR)	0

Second round
A Zhangabayeva (KAZ)	RSC
C Martínez (VEN)
L Kovačić (CRO)
K Krówka (POL)	RSC
S Lawless (IRL)	RSC
S Zoubaâ (MAR)
O Ismoilova (UZB)	RSC
S Brettschneider (SVK)
N Nikolov (SLO)	0
Pak S-a (PRK)	5
L Grabert (GER)	3
E Rzayeva (AZE)	2
A Bușe (ROU)	WO
K Müncz (HUN)
H Babat (TUR)	0
O Kantzari (GRE)	5

Quarterfinals
A Zhangabayeva (KAZ)	5
K Krówka (POL)	0
S Lawless (IRL)	RSC
O Ismoilova (UZB)
Pak S-a (PRK)	5
L Grabert (GER)	0
A Bușe (ROU)
O Kantzari (GRE)	RSC

Semifinals
A Zhangabayeva (KAZ)	0
S Lawless (IRL)	5
Pak S-a (PRK)	5
O Kantzari (GRE)	0

Final
S Lawless (IRL)	4
Pak S-a (PRK)	1

=== Women's Welterweight (66 kg) ===
First round
A Kostrzewa (POL)	5
M Šteko (CRO)	0
A Ţugui (ROU)	RSC
G Gataveckaitė (LTU)
T Uldana (KAZ)	4
Z Özdemir (TUR)	1
R Kurbonboeva (UZB)	5
K Bargach (MAR)	0
X Valencia (MEX)
K Doyle (IRL)	RSC
L Acosta (VEN)
S Dina (CHN)	RSC

Quarterfinals
A Kostrzewa (POL)	2
A Ţugui (ROU)	3
T Uldana (KAZ)	5
A Gribanova (RUS)	0
R Kurbonboeva (UZB)	1
K Doyle (IRL)	4
S Dina (CHN)	RSC
R Mokoma (LES)

Semifinals
A Ţugui (ROU)
T Uldana (KAZ)	RSC
K Doyle (IRL)	5
S Dina (CHN)	0

Final
T Uldana (KAZ)	0
K Doyle (IRL)	5

=== Women's Light Middleweight (70 kg) ===
First round
A Frolova (RUS)	1
O Toirova (UZB)	4
E Koterska (POL)	5
S Murphy (IBA)	0
E Şopterean (ROU)	0
M Pérez (COL)	5
X Hernández (MEX)
YG Yılmaz (TUR)	WO
A Bošković (SRB)	0
M Sidorenko (KAZ)	5
I Nadari (TUN)	RSC
L Haxholli (KOS)

Quarterfinals
O Toirova (UZB)	4
E Koterska (POL)	1
M Pérez (COL)	0
A Alimire (CHN)	5
YG Yılmaz (TUR)	4
M Sidorenko (KAZ)	1
I Nadari (TUN)	RSC
N Bousellam (MAR)

Semifinals
O Toirova (UZB)	0
A Alimire (CHN)	5
YG Yılmaz (TUR)	4
I Nadari (TUN)	1

Final
A Alimire (CHN)	5
YG Yılmaz (TUR)	0

=== Women's Middleweight (75 kg) ===
First round
H Lemaire (PYF)
K Prusakova (RUS)	RSC
O Araszewska (POL)	1
D Sak (TUR)	4

Quarterfinals
K Prusakova (RUS)
Bao ZY (CHN)	RSC
S Nalibay (KAZ)	4
A Niță (ROU)	1
D Sak (TUR)	RSC
A Talbi (TUN)
N McLaughlin (IBA)	WO
L Alonso (MEX)

Semifinals
Bao ZY (CHN)	5
S Nalibay (KAZ)	0
D Sak (TUR)	0
N McLaughlin (IBA)	5

Final
Bao ZY (CHN)	RSC
N McLaughlin (IBA)

=== Women's Light Heavyweight (81 kg) ===
Quarterfinals		Semifinals		Final
A Mehmed (BUL)	1
J Oleś (POL)	4	J Oleś (POL)	1
A Panina (RUS)	0	A Zeinollayeva (KAZ)	4
A Zeinollayeva (KAZ)	5			A Zeinollayeva (KAZ)	5
SN Arslan (TUR)	5			R Parpieva (UZB)	0
D Gheba (ROU)	0	SN Arslan (TUR)	0
		R Parpieva (UZB)	5

=== Women's Heavyweight (+81 kg) ===
Quarterfinals
S Van Der Zanden (POL)
H Kethüda (TUR)	RSC
E Platon (ROU)
P Seiitkhankyzy (KAZ)	RSC
S Shakhobiddinova (UZB)	ABD
L Kern (SLO)

Semifinals
H Kethüda (TUR)	RSC
P Seiitkhankyzy (KAZ)
S Shakhobiddinova (UZB)	5
S Dushina (RUS)	0

Final
H Kethüda (TUR)	RSC
S Shakhobiddinova (UZB)
