= Abdul Burton =

English boxer

Personal information
- Nationality: England

Boxing career
Medal record
Men's amateur boxing
Representing England
EB European Championships
Silver medal – second place	2026 Sofia	55 kg

Abdul Burton is an English boxer. He competed at the 2026 European Amateur Boxing Championships, winning the silver medal in the men's 55 kg event.
