= 2026 European Boxing Championships – Women's +80 kg =

Women's +80 kg at the 2026 European Boxing Championships
- Venue: Asics Arena
- Location: Sofia, Bulgaria
- Dates: 20–24 September
- Competitors: 8 from 8 nations

Medalists
| gold medal | Havvanur Kethüda | Turkey |
| silver medal | Kseniia Olifirenko | Russia |
| bronze medal | Zsófia Szira | Hungary |
| bronze medal | Elżbieta Wójcik | Poland |

The women's +80 kg competition at the 2026 European Boxing Championships was held from 20 to 24 September 2026.

== Results ==
Quarterfinals; 20 September
(Hungary) Zsófia Szira | 5
(Armenia) Ani Muradyan | 0
(Russia) Kseniia Olifirenko | 5
(Moldova) Daria Sazonova | 0
(Poland) Elżbieta Wójcik | 5
(Republic of Ireland) Cliona D'Arcy | 0
(Turkey) Havvanur Kethüda | RSC
(Ukraine) Mariia Lovchynska

Semifinals; 23 September
(Hungary) Zsófia Szira | 0
(Russia) Kseniia Olifirenko | 5
(Poland) Elżbieta Wójcik
(Turkey) Havvanur Kethüda | RSC

Final; 24 September
(Russia) Kseniia Olifirenko | 2
(Turkey) Havvanur Kethüda | 3
