= 2026 European Boxing Championships – Women's 65 kg =

Women's 65 kg at the 2026 European Boxing Championships
- Venue: Asics Arena
- Location: Sofia, Bulgaria
- Dates: 17–25 September
- Competitors: 23 from 23 nations

Medalists
gold medal	Azaliia Amineva	Russia
silver medal	Luca Hámori	Hungary
bronze medal	Elida Kocharyan	Armenia
bronze medal	Kinga Krówka	Poland

The women's 65 kg competition at the 2026 European Boxing Championships was held from 17 to 25 September 2026.

== Results ==
=== Final ===
Final; 25 September
(Russia) Azaliia Amineva	5
(Hungary) Luca Hámori	0

=== Top half ===
Round of 32; 17 September
(Bulgaria) Valeria Andreeva	0
(Croatia) Sara Beram	5
(Turkey) Berfin Kabak	0
(Romania) Crinuța Sebe	4
(Armenia) Elida Kocharyan	5
(Spain) Mariana Soto	0

Round of 16; 19 September
(England) Sacha Hickey	0
(Croatia) Sara Beram	5
(Russia) Azaliia Amineva	5
(Czech Republic) Viktorie Jílková	0
(Ukraine) Maryna Shevchenko	0
(Romania) Crinuța Sebe	4
(Armenia) Elida Kocharyan	RSC
(Albania) Esmeralda Novruzaj

Quarterfinals; 22 September
(Croatia) Sara Beram	0
(Russia) Azaliia Amineva	5
(Romania) Crinuța Sebe
(Armenia) Elida Kocharyan	RSC

Semifinals; 23 September
(Russia) Azaliia Amineva	5
(Armenia) Elida Kocharyan	0

=== Bottom half ===
Round of 32; 17 September
(Switzerland) Anna Jenni	5
(Georgia (country)) Lorena Surmanidze	0
(Latvia) Beatrise Rozentāle	w/o
(Netherlands) Aaliyah Hoppema
(Germany) Jule Woche	0
(Serbia) Anastasija Lukajić	5
(Greece) Despoina Makri	0
(Denmark) Caroline Lauenborg	5

Round of 16; 19 September
(Hungary) Luca Hámori	3
(Switzerland) Anna Jenni	2
(Latvia) Beatrise Rozentāle	5
(Belarus) Darya Letsko	0
(Slovakia) Tamara Kubalová	5
(Serbia) Anastasija Lukajić	0
(Denmark) Caroline Lauenborg	0
(Poland) Kinga Krówka	3

Quarterfinals; 22 September
(Hungary) Luca Hámori	5
(Latvia) Beatrise Rozentāle	0
(Slovakia) Tamara Kubalová	2
(Poland) Kinga Krówka	3

Semifinals; 23 September
(Hungary) Luca Hámori	4
(Poland) Kinga Krówka	1
