= Dilara Sak =

Turkish women's boxer (born 2006)

Personal information
- Nationality: Turkish
- Born: 14 February 2006 (age 20) Akçaabat, Trabzon, Turkey
- Weight: 70 kg (150 lb)

Boxing career
Medal record
Women's amateur boxing
Representing Turkey
Mediterranean Games
Bronze medal – third place	2026 Taranto	Light middleweight

Dilara Sak (born 14 February 2006) is a Turkish female boxer who competes in the light middleweight (70 kg) division. She is a member of Trabzonspor Boxing, and represents Turkey at international comprtitions.

== Sport career ==
Sak competed in the 66 kg division at the 2024 European Youth Boxing Championships held in Poreč, Croatia. That same year, she won a bronze medal in the 75 kg division at the IBA Youth World Boxing Championships in Budva, Montenegro..

In 2025, she became the Turkish champion in the 70 kg division at the U22 Women's Turkish Boxing Championships in Samsun. She transferred to Trabzonspor Boxing in July. She won a bronze medal in the 70 kg division at the 2025 European U23 Championships in Budapest, Hungary.

She finished second in the 70 kg division at the 2026 Turkish Women's Individual Boxing Championships in Daroca, Kocaeli. That same year, she took a bronze medal in the 70 kg event at the 2026 Mediterranean Games in Taranto, Italy.

== Personal life ==
Diara Sak was bornin Akçaabat District of Trabzon Province on 14 February 2006.
