= Jon McConnell =

Northern Irish boxer (born 2002)

Personal information
- Nationality: Northern Ireland
- Born: 30 September 2002 (age 23)

Boxing career
- Club: Holy Trinity - Belfast
Medal record
Men's amateur boxing
Representing Ireland
EB European Championships
Bronze medal – third place	2026 Sofia	70 kg
Representing Northern Ireland
Commonwealth Games
Gold medal – first place	2026 Glasgow	70 kg

Jon McConnell is a Northern Irish boxer. He competed at the 2026 Commonwealth Games, winning the gold medal in the men's 70 kg event. McConnell won a bronze medal in the men's 70 kg division at the 2026 European Championships.
