= Nguyễn Thị Tâm =

Vietnamese boxer (born 1994)

Personal information
- Full name: Nguyễn Thị Tâm
- Nationality: Vietnamese
- Born: 4 April 1994 (age 32) Thái Bình, Vietnam

Sport
- Sport: Boxing
Medal record
Women's boxing
Representing Vietnam
World Championships
| Silver medal – second place | 2023 New Delhi | Light flyweight |
Asian Championships
| Gold medal – first place | 2017 Ho Chi Minh City | Flyweight |
| Gold medal – first place | 2022 Amman | Light flyweight |
| Silver medal – second place | 2019 Bangkok | Flyweight |
Asian Games
| Bronze medal – third place | 2018 Jakarta-Palembang | Flyweight |
Southeast Asian Games
| Gold medal – first place | 2019 Philippines | Flyweight |
| Gold medal – first place | 2021 Vietnam | Flyweight |

Nguyễn Thị Tâm (born 4 April 1994) is a Vietnamese boxer. She competed in the women's flyweight event at the 2020 Summer Olympics.
