= 2026 European Boxing Championships – Men's 80 kg =

Men's 80 kg at the 2026 European Boxing Championships
- Venue: Asics Arena
- Location: Sofia, Bulgaria
- Dates: 18–25 September
- Competitors: 23 from 23 nations

Medalists
gold medal	Cheerav Ashalaev	Russia
silver medal	Rastko Simić	Serbia
bronze medal	Pavlo Illiusha	Ukraine
bronze medal	Oladimeji Shittu	England

The men's 80 kg competition at the 2026 European Boxing Championships was held from 18 to 25 September 2026.

== Results ==
=== Final ===
Final; 25 September
(Serbia) Rastko Simić	0
(Russia) Cheerav Ashalaev	5

=== Top half ===
Round of 32; 18 September
(Georgia (country)) Luka Matchutadze	3
(Hungary) Mihály Bátori	2
(Israel) Daniel Ilyushonok	0
(Ukraine) Pavlo Illiusha	5
(Turkey) Sultan Osmanlı	2
(Armenia) Artush Hovhannisyan	3
(Bosnia and Herzegovina) Vuk Mičić	0
(Czech Republic) Daniel Florian	5
(Serbia) Rastko Simić	5
(Lithuania) Arvydas Dainys	0

Round of 16; 21 September
(France) Yojerlin César	1
(Georgia (country)) Luka Matchutadze	3
(Ukraine) Pavlo Illiusha	5
(Armenia) Artush Hovhannisyan	0
(Bulgaria) William Cholov	4
(Czech Republic) Daniel Florian	1
(Serbia) Rastko Simić	ABD
(Azerbaijan) Murad Allahverdiyev

Quarterfinals; 23 September
(Georgia (country)) Luka Matchutadze
(Ukraine) Pavlo Illiusha	RSC
(Bulgaria) William Cholov	0
(Serbia) Rastko Simić	5

Semifinals; 24 September
(Ukraine) Pavlo Illiusha	0
(Serbia) Rastko Simić	4

=== Bottom half ===
Round of 32; 18 September
(Belgium) Hadjit Noa	2
(Greece) Michail Tsamalidis	3
(Germany) Ramil Schäfer	0
(Austria) Lucky Aimufua	5
(Romania) Alex Zaharia	0
(Moldova) Valeriu Răzmeriță	5
(Russia) Cheerav Ashalaev	RSC
(Albania) Amar Koçi

Round of 16; 21 September
(England) Oladimeji Shittu	3
(Greece) Michail Tsamalidis	2
(Austria) Lucky Aimufua	3
(Spain) Pablo Coy	0
(Poland) Michał Pierzchała	5
(Moldova) Valeriu Răzmeriță	0
(Russia) Cheerav Ashalaev	5
(Croatia) Gabrijel Veočić	0

Quarterfinals; 23 September
(England) Oladimeji Shittu	5
(Austria) Lucky Aimufua	0
(Poland) Michał Pierzchała	0
(Russia) Cheerav Ashalaev	5

Semifinals; 24 September
(England) Oladimeji Shittu	1
(Russia) Cheerav Ashalaev	4
