= Havvanur Kethüda =

Turkish female boxer (born 2007)

Personal information
- Nationality: Turkish
- Born: 1 January 2007 (age 19) Araklı, Trabzon, Turkey

Boxing career
Medal record
Women's amateur boxing
Representing Turkey
European Championships
Gold medal – first place	2026 Sofia	+80 kg
IBA Youth World Championships
Gold medal – first place	2024 Budva	+81 kg
World Junior Cup
Gold medal – first place	2025 Budva	+81 kg
European Junior Championships
Gold medal – first place	2025 Ostrava	+80 kg
Gold medal – first place	2024 Poreč	+81 kg
European Youth Championships
Gold medal – first place	2023 Ploiești	+80 kg

Havvanur Kethüda (born 1 January 2007) is a Turkish female boxer competing in the heavyweight (+80 kg kg) division. She is a member of Trabzonspor Boxing and represents Turkey at internayional competitions.

== Sport career ==
Kethüda is a member of Trabzonspor Boxing şn her hometown.

After playing basketball for eight years, she took up boxing in 2023, and won first place at the Turkish Championship following a three-month preparation period. That same year, she became the champion at the European Schoolboys and Schoolgirls Boxing Championships in Ploiești, Romania by defeating her opponent via referee's decision in the first round of the women's +80 kg final.

In 2024, she won the gold medal at the European Junior Boxing Championships in Poreč, Croatia by defeating her opponent in the first round of the +81 kg final. That same year, she competed in the +81 kg division at the IBA Youth World Championships in Budva, Montenegro, and became the world champion.

She won the gold medal in the +81 kg final of the Youth World Cup International Boxing Tournament in Budva in March 2025. She was named the tournament's best female boxer. In October, she secured her third European title in the +80 kg at the European U19 Boxing Championships in Ostrava, Czech Republic.

She became champion in the +80 kg division at the Women's Elite Turkish Individual Boxing Championships in Darıca in 2026. She won the title at the 63rd Belgrade International Boxing Tournament, in Serbia in May. At the 2026 European Championships in Sofia, she won the gold medal in the +80 kg division.

== Personal life ==
Havvanur Kethüda was born in Araklı District of Trabzon Province, northeastern Turkey in 2007.
