= Luca Hámori =

Hungarian boxer (born 2001)

Personal information
- Born: Anna Luca Hámori; 12 March 2001 (age 25) Szombathely, Hungary
- Height: 1.75 m (5 ft 9 in)

Boxing career
- Weight class: Welterweight
- Stance: Orthodox

Boxing record
- Total fights: 32
- Wins: 18
- Win by KO: 3
- Losses: 13
- Draws: 0
- No contests: 0
Medal record
Women's amateur boxing
Representing Hungary
European Games
Bronze medal – third place	2023 Kraków–Małopolska	Welterweight
European Boxing Championships
Silver medal – second place	2026 Sofia	65 kg
European U22 Championships
Silver medal – second place	2022 Poreč	Welterweight

Anna Luca Hámori (born 12 March 2001) is a Hungarian amateur boxer.

She is a member of the Hungarian national team and an 11-time national champion in Hungary. She competed at the 2024 Summer Olympics, becoming the first female boxer to represent Hungary at the Olympic Games.

She competes for the Fitt-Box Boxing Association based in Kőszeg.

== Career ==
She started boxing in 2011. She credits her older brother Ádám with inspiring her to pursue a boxing career.

She won a silver medal at the 2016 European Junior Championships and a bronze medal at the 2018 European Youth Championships. She represented Hungary at the 2018 Summer Youth Olympics, where she competed in the 60 kg division. In 2022, she took the silver medal in the welterweight category at the European U22 Championships in Poreč, Croatia.

At the 2023 European Games in Nowy Targ, Poland, she won a bronze medal in the welterweight category, thus earning a quota for the 2024 Summer Olympics. She also competed at the 2024 European Championships in Belgrade, Serbia, but lost to Oshin Derieuw in the preliminary round.

=== 2024 Summer Olympics ===
She represented Hungary at the Paris Olympic Games in the 66 kg category, becoming the first female boxer from Hungary to participate in the Olympics. She defeated Marissa Williamson of Australia in the round of 16. In the quarterfinal, she lost 0–5 to Imane Khelif of Algeria.

At the 2026 European Championships, Hámori won the silver medal in the 65 kg category, losing in the final to Russia's Azaliia Amineva by unanimous decision.

== Awards ==
She was elected Hungarian Boxer of the Year in 2021, 2022 and 2023.

== Personal life ==
Hámori was born in Szombathely on 12 March 2001. Her older brother, Ádám Hámori (born 1995), is a five-time national champion and European junior champion in boxing.

As of 2024, she lives in Kőszeg.
