= 2026 European Boxing Championships – Men's 70 kg =

Men's 70 kg at the 2026 European Boxing Championships
- Venue: Asics Arena
- Location: Sofia, Bulgaria
- Dates: 17–25 September
- Competitors: 31 from 31 nations

Medalists
| gold medal | Sergei Koldenkov | Russia |
| silver medal | Nabi Isgandarov | Azerbaijan |
| bronze medal | Makan Traoré | France |
| bronze medal | Jon McConnell | Ireland |

The men's 70 kg competition at the 2026 European Boxing Championships was held from 17 to 25 September 2026.

== Results ==
=== Final ===
| Final; 25 September |
| (Russia) Sergei Koldenkov | 5 |
| (Azerbaijan) Nabi Isgandarov | 0 |

=== Top half ===
Round of 32; 17 September
(Albania) Alban Beqiri | 0
(Greece) Zacharias Mylonas | 5
(Serbia) Filip Džida | 4
(Moldova) Vasile Cebotari | 1
(Ukraine) Mark Lomakin | 4
(Austria) Arsen Chabyan | 1
(Czech Republic) Kelvin Soquessa | 5
(Belgium) Hornel Ayitevi | 0
(Russia) Sergei Koldenkov | RSC
(Netherlands) Finn Bos
(Belarus) Vadzim Vauchok | 4
(Germany) Randi Botikali | 1
(Spain) Frank Martínez | 5
(England) Patrick Hewitt | 0

Round of 16; 19 September
(France) Makan Traoré | 5
(Greece) Zacharias Mylonas | 0
(Serbia) Filip Džida | 0
(Ukraine) Mark Lomakin | 5
(Czech Republic) Kelvin Soquessa
(Russia) Sergei Koldenkov | RSC
(Belarus) Vadzim Vauchok | 2
(Spain) Frank Martínez | 3

Quarterfinals; 21 September
(France) Makan Traoré | 3
(Ukraine) Mark Lomakin | 2
(Russia) Sergei Koldenkov | 5
(Spain) Frank Martínez | 0

Semifinals; 23 September
(France) Makan Traoré | 0
(Russia) Sergei Koldenkov | 4

=== Bottom half ===
Round of 32; 17 September
(Azerbaijan) Nabi Isgandarov | 4
(Montenegro) Miloš Roganović | 1
(Portugal) João Ferreira
(Croatia) Fabijan Tomkić | w/o
(Romania) Daniel Grigorie | 2
(Hungary) Kálmán Hankó | 3
(Slovakia) Adolf Staněk | 5
(Armenia) Harutyun Hakobkokhyan | 0
(Italy) Gabriele Guidi Rontani | 5
(Israel) Tomer Benny | 0
(Bulgaria) Blagovest Nedelchev | 5
(North Macedonia) Alim Nasufi | 0
(Turkey) Necat Ekinci | 0
(Republic of Ireland) Jon McConnell | 5
(Lithuania) Aleksandr Trofimčiuk | 0
(Poland) Damian Durkacz | 5

Round of 16; 19 September
(Azerbaijan) Nabi Isgandarov | RSC
(Croatia) Fabijan Tomkić
(Hungary) Kálmán Hankó | 3
(Slovakia) Adolf Staněk | 2
(Italy) Gabriele Guidi Rontani | 4
(Bulgaria) Blagovest Nedelchev | 1
(Republic of Ireland) Jon McConnell | 4
(Poland) Damian Durkacz | 1

Quarterfinals; 21 September
(Azerbaijan) Nabi Isgandarov | 5
(Hungary) Kálmán Hankó | 0
(Italy) Gabriele Guidi Rontani | 2
(Republic of Ireland) Jon McConnell | 3

Semifinals; 23 September
(Azerbaijan) Nabi Isgandarov | 4
(Republic of Ireland) Jon McConnell | 1
