= 2026 European Boxing Championships – Men's 55 kg =

Men's 55 kg at the 2026 European Boxing Championships
- Venue: Asics Arena
- Location: Sofia, Bulgaria
- Dates: 17–25 September
- Competitors: 25 from 25 nations

Medalists
| gold medal | Viacheslav Rogozin | Russia |
| silver medal | Abdul Burton | England |
| bronze medal | Amin Mammadzada | Azerbaijan |
| bronze medal | Semih Gümüş | Turkey |

The men's 55 kg competition at the 2026 European Boxing Championships was held from 17 to 25 September 2026.

== Results ==
=== Final ===
| Final; 25 September |
| (Russia) Viacheslav Rogozin | 5 |
| (England) Abdul Burton | 0 |

=== Top half ===
Round of 32; 17 September
(Slovakia) Tibor Katona
(Russia) Viacheslav Rogozin | RSC
(Ukraine) Maksym Zymenko | 5
(Belarus) Dzianis Salotskikh | 0
(Poland) Nikolas Pawlik | 5
(Hungary) Gábor Virbán | 0
(Georgia (country)) Gor Ayvazyan | 0
(France) Billal Bennama | 5
(Belgium) Nadir Boulaiz | 2
(Armenia) Zhirayr Sargsyan | 3

Round of 16; 19 September
(Spain) Rafael Lozano | 0
(Russia) Viacheslav Rogozin | 5
(Ukraine) Maksym Zymenko | 1
(Poland) Nikolas Pawlik | 4
(Serbia) Artur Nagapetjan | 0
(France) Billal Bennama | 5
(Armenia) Zhirayr Sargsyan | 0
(Azerbaijan) Amin Mammadzada | 3

Quarterfinals; 22 September
(Russia) Viacheslav Rogozin | 5
(Poland) Nikolas Pawlik | 0
(France) Billal Bennama | 2
(Azerbaijan) Amin Mammadzada | 3

Semifinals; 24 September
(Russia) Viacheslav Rogozin | KO
(Azerbaijan) Amin Mammadzada

=== Bottom half ===
Round of 32; 17 September
(Turkey) Semih Gümüş | 5
(Portugal) Arménio Reis | 0
(Kosovo) Bashkim Bajoku | 5
(Israel) Farid Hreish | 0
(England) Abdul Burton | 5
Omid Ahmadisafa | 0
(Sweden) Nebil Ibrahim | 0
(Italy) Tommaso Sciacca | 5

Round of 16; 19 September
(Germany) Ali El Sari | 0
(Turkey) Semih Gümüş | 4
(Kosovo) Bashkim Bajoku | 5
(Albania) Kristian Koço | 0
(Romania) Adrian Preda | 0
(England) Abdul Burton | 5
(Italy) Tommaso Sciacca | 0
(Bulgaria) Javier Ibáñez | 5

Quarterfinals; 22 September
(Turkey) Semih Gümüş | 5
(Kosovo) Bashkim Bajoku | 0
(England) Abdul Burton | 3
(Bulgaria) Javier Ibáñez | 2

Semifinals; 24 September
(Turkey) Semih Gümüş | 1
(England) Abdul Burton | 4
