= 2026 European Boxing Championships =

Boxing competitions

- Venue: Asics Arena Sports Hall
- Location: Sofia, Bulgaria
- Dates: 17–25 September
- Competitors: 381 from 43 nations

The 2026 European Boxing Championships also known as the 2026 European Boxing Elite Championships were held from 17 to 25 September 2026 in Sofia, Bulgaria under the aegis of European Boxing. They were the first championships held under the authority of the new World Boxing-affiliated continental organisation.

== Schedule ==
Date Event	Thu 17		Fri 18		Sat 19		Sun 20		Mon 21		Tue 22		Wed 23		Thu 24		Fri 25
Date Event	13:30	18:00	13:30	18:00	13:30	18:00	13:30	18:00	13:30	18:00	13:30	18:00	13:30	18:00	13:30	18:00	17:00
Men's 50 kg								R16				QF		SF		F	
Men's 55 kg	R32				R16						QF				SF		F
Men's 60 kg			R32						R16				QF		SF		F
Men's 65 kg				R32				R16				QF		SF		F	
Men's 70 kg		R32				R16				QF				SF			F
Men's 75 kg				R32						R16				QF		SF	F
Men's 80 kg			R32						R16				QF		SF		F
Men's 85 kg		R32		R16						QF				SF		F	
Men's 90 kg	R32						R16				QF		SF				F
Men's +90 kg				R32				R16				QF		SF			F
Women's 48 kg						R16						QF		SF		F	
Women's 51 kg					R16						QF		SF				F
Women's 54 kg			R32				R16						QF		SF		F
Women's 57 kg						R32				R16				QF		SF	F
Women's 60 kg			R32						R16				QF		SF		F
Women's 65 kg	R32				R16						QF		SF				F
Women's 70 kg			R32				R16				QF		SF				F
Women's 75 kg						R16						QF		SF			F
Women's 80 kg						R16						QF		SF		F	
Women's +80 kg								QF						SF		F	

== Medal table ==
* Host nation (Bulgaria)

Rank	Nation	Gold	Silver	Bronze	Total
1	Russia	7	5	3	15
2	Turkey	4	1	5	10
3	Azerbaijan	2	1	2	5
4	Serbia	2	1	1	4
5	Ireland	2	0	2	4
6	Ukraine	1	2	2	5
7	Hungary	1	1	1	3
8	Bulgaria*	1	0	1	2
9	England	0	3	2	5
10	France	0	3	1	4
11	Spain	0	2	1	3
12	Finland	0	1	1	2
13	Poland	0	0	4	4
14	Armenia	0	0	2	2
14	Austria	0	0	2	2
14	Czech Republic	0	0	2	2
14	Germany	0	0	2	2
18	Croatia	0	0	1	1
18	Georgia	0	0	1	1
18	Kosovo	0	0	1	1
18	Moldova	0	0	1	1
18	North Macedonia	0	0	1	1
18	Norway	0	0	1	1
Totals (23 entries)		20	20	40	80

== Medalists ==
=== Men ===
Event	Gold	Silver	Bronze
50 kg	Subhan Mamedov; Azerbaijan	Bair Batlaev; Russia	Samet Gümüş; Turkey
50 kg	Subhan Mamedov; Azerbaijan	Bair Batlaev; Russia	Rudolf Garboyan; Armenia
55 kg	Viacheslav Rogozin; Russia	Abdul Burton; England	Amin Mammadzada; Azerbaijan
55 kg	Viacheslav Rogozin; Russia	Abdul Burton; England	Semih Gümüş; Turkey
60 kg	Radoslav Rosenov; Bulgaria	Aider Abduraimov; Ukraine	Ewart Marín; Spain
60 kg	Radoslav Rosenov; Bulgaria	Aider Abduraimov; Ukraine	Alen Rustemovski; North Macedonia
65 kg	Elvin Aliiev; Ukraine	Hugo Grau; France	Alexandru Paraschiv; Moldova
65 kg	Elvin Aliiev; Ukraine	Hugo Grau; France	Ismail Umar; Finland
70 kg	Sergei Koldenkov; Russia	Nabi Isgandarov; Azerbaijan	Makan Traoré; France
70 kg	Sergei Koldenkov; Russia	Nabi Isgandarov; Azerbaijan	Jon McConnell; Ireland
75 kg	Saidjamshid Jafarov; Azerbaijan	Ismail Mutsolgov; Russia	Callum Makin; England
75 kg	Saidjamshid Jafarov; Azerbaijan	Ismail Mutsolgov; Russia	Rami Kiwan; Bulgaria
80 kg	Cheerav Ashalaev; Russia	Rastko Simić; Serbia	Oladimeji Shittu; England
80 kg	Cheerav Ashalaev; Russia	Rastko Simić; Serbia	Pavlo Illiusha; Ukraine
85 kg	Dmitrii Karmanov; Russia	Junior Tadah; France	Antonio Grabić; Croatia
85 kg	Dmitrii Karmanov; Russia	Junior Tadah; France	Michael Derouiche; Austria
90 kg	Emrah Yaşar; Turkey	Enmanuel Reyes; Spain	Kevin Lebowski; Germany
90 kg	Emrah Yaşar; Turkey	Enmanuel Reyes; Spain	Georgii Kushitashvili; Georgia
+90 kg	David Surov; Russia	Damar Thomas; England	Ahmed Hagag; Austria
+90 kg	David Surov; Russia	Damar Thomas; England	Mahammad Abdullayev; Azerbaijan

=== Women ===
Event	Gold	Silver	Bronze
48 kg	Iuliia Chumgalakova; Russia	Hanna Okhota; Ukraine	Angelika Krysztoforska; Poland
48 kg	Iuliia Chumgalakova; Russia	Hanna Okhota; Ukraine	Nurselen Yalgettekin; Turkey
51 kg	Hatice Akbaş; Turkey	Laura Fuertes; Spain	Natalia Kuczewska; Poland
51 kg	Hatice Akbaş; Turkey	Laura Fuertes; Spain	Maxi Klötzer; Germany
54 kg	Sara Ćirković; Serbia	Pihla Kaivo-oja; Finland	Anastasiia Kool; Russia
54 kg	Sara Ćirković; Serbia	Pihla Kaivo-oja; Finland	Lenka Bernardová; Czech Republic
57 kg	Vladislava Kukhta; Hungary	Liudmila Vorontsova; Russia	Michaela Walsh; Ireland
57 kg	Vladislava Kukhta; Hungary	Liudmila Vorontsova; Russia	Esra Yıldız Kahraman; Turkey
60 kg	Kristina Kuluhova; Serbia	Sthélyne Grosy; France	Donjeta Sadiku; Kosovo
60 kg	Kristina Kuluhova; Serbia	Sthélyne Grosy; France	Gizem Özer; Turkey
65 kg	Azaliia Amineva; Russia	Luca Hámori; Hungary	Elida Kocharyan; Armenia
65 kg	Azaliia Amineva; Russia	Luca Hámori; Hungary	Kinga Krówka; Poland
70 kg	Busenaz Sürmeneli; Turkey	Chantelle Reid; England	Nadezhda Golubeva; Russia
70 kg	Busenaz Sürmeneli; Turkey	Chantelle Reid; England	Milena Matović; Serbia
75 kg	Aoife O'Rourke; Ireland	Büşra Işıldar; Turkey	Saltanat Medenova; Russia
75 kg	Aoife O'Rourke; Ireland	Büşra Işıldar; Turkey	Sunniva Hofstad; Norway
80 kg	Lisa O'Rourke; Ireland	Anastasiia Demurchian; Russia	Iryna Lutsak; Ukraine
80 kg	Lisa O'Rourke; Ireland	Anastasiia Demurchian; Russia	Stella Blažková; Czech Republic
+80 kg	Havvanur Kethüda; Turkey	Kseniia Olifirenko; Russia	Elżbieta Wójcik; Poland
+80 kg	Havvanur Kethüda; Turkey	Kseniia Olifirenko; Russia	Zsófia Szira; Hungary

== Participating nations ==
Nation	Men										Women										Total
Nation	50 kg	55 kg	60 kg	65 kg	70 kg	75 kg	80 kg	85 kg	90 kg	+90 kg	48 kg	51 kg	54 kg	57 kg	60 kg	65 kg	70 kg	75 kg	80 kg	+80 kg	Total
Albania	Yes	Yes			Yes	Yes	Yes									Yes					6
Armenia	Yes	Yes	Yes	Yes	Yes	Yes	Yes	Yes	Yes	Yes	Yes		Yes			Yes				Yes	14
Austria				Yes	Yes		Yes	Yes		Yes											5
Azerbaijan	Yes	Yes	Yes	Yes	Yes	Yes	Yes	Yes	Yes	Yes			Yes								11
Belarus		Yes	Yes	Yes	Yes	Yes		Yes		Yes	Yes	Yes		Yes		Yes	Yes				12
Belgium		Yes		Yes	Yes	Yes	Yes	Yes		Yes				Yes							8
Bosnia and Herzegovina							Yes														1
Bulgaria	Yes	Yes	Yes	Yes	Yes	Yes	Yes	Yes	Yes	Yes		Yes	Yes	Yes		Yes			Yes		15
Croatia				Yes	Yes	Yes	Yes	Yes	Yes	Yes				Yes		Yes					9
Czech Republic					Yes		Yes	Yes					Yes		Yes	Yes		Yes	Yes		8
Denmark				Yes												Yes	Yes				3
England		Yes	Yes	Yes	Yes	Yes	Yes		Yes	Yes		Yes	Yes	Yes	Yes	Yes	Yes	Yes	Yes		16
Estonia								Yes													1
Finland				Yes							Yes		Yes								3
France		Yes	Yes	Yes	Yes		Yes	Yes	Yes			Yes	Yes	Yes	Yes		Yes	Yes			13
Georgia	Yes	Yes	Yes	Yes			Yes		Yes	Yes	Yes					Yes			Yes		10
Germany		Yes	Yes	Yes	Yes	Yes	Yes	Yes	Yes	Yes		Yes				Yes	Yes	Yes			13
Greece	Yes		Yes		Yes	Yes	Yes				Yes			Yes	Yes	Yes	Yes		Yes		11
Hungary	Yes	Yes		Yes	Yes	Yes	Yes	Yes	Yes		Yes	Yes	Yes	Yes		Yes		Yes		Yes	15
Ireland			Yes	Yes	Yes	Yes			Yes		Yes	Yes	Yes	Yes	Yes		Yes	Yes	Yes	Yes	14
Israel	Yes	Yes	Yes	Yes	Yes	Yes	Yes	Yes													8
Italy		Yes	Yes	Yes	Yes			Yes	Yes		Yes	Yes	Yes	Yes			Yes				11
Kosovo		Yes													Yes						2
Latvia																Yes	Yes				2
Lithuania			Yes		Yes		Yes			Yes					Yes			Yes			6
Luxembourg			Yes																		1
Moldova	Yes		Yes	Yes	Yes	Yes	Yes	Yes	Yes	Yes		Yes	Yes							Yes	12
Montenegro			Yes		Yes									Yes							3
Netherlands			Yes		Yes									Yes	Yes	Yes	Yes				6
North Macedonia			Yes		Yes				Yes												3
Norway										Yes								Yes	Yes		3
Poland		Yes	Yes	Yes	Yes	Yes	Yes	Yes	Yes	Yes	Yes	Yes	Yes	Yes	Yes	Yes	Yes	Yes	Yes	Yes	19
Portugal	Yes	Yes	Yes	Yes	Yes	Yes							Yes		Yes						8
Romania		Yes	Yes	Yes	Yes	Yes	Yes							Yes		Yes	Yes				9
Russia	Yes	Yes	Yes	Yes	Yes	Yes	Yes	Yes	Yes	Yes	Yes	Yes	Yes	Yes	Yes	Yes	Yes	Yes	Yes	Yes	20
Serbia		Yes			Yes	Yes	Yes					Yes	Yes	Yes	Yes	Yes	Yes				10
Slovakia		Yes	Yes	Yes	Yes	Yes			Yes		Yes			Yes	Yes	Yes	Yes				11
Spain	Yes	Yes	Yes	Yes	Yes		Yes	Yes	Yes		Yes	Yes			Yes	Yes	Yes	Yes			14
Sweden		Yes				Yes									Yes						3
Switzerland																Yes					1
Turkey	Yes	Yes	Yes	Yes	Yes	Yes	Yes		Yes	Yes	Yes	Yes	Yes	Yes	Yes	Yes	Yes	Yes	Yes	Yes	19
Ukraine	Yes	Yes	Yes	Yes	Yes	Yes	Yes	Yes	Yes	Yes	Yes	Yes	Yes	Yes	Yes	Yes	Yes	Yes	Yes	Yes	20
World Boxing Refugee Team		Yes							Yes												2
Total (43 entries)	14	25	26	26	31	23	25	19	20	17	14	15	17	19	17	23	18	13	11	8	381
