= Şırnak University =

Public university in Şırnak, Turkey

- Şırnak Üniversitesi
- Established: 2008
- Location: Şırnak, Turkey
- Website: Official website

Şırnak University (Turkish: Şırnak Üniversitesi) is a university located in Şırnak, Turkey. It was established in 2008.

== History ==
The university was established on May 22, 2008, by the founding rector Ali Akmaz with Law No. 5765. It consists of the newly established Faculty of Economics and Administrative Sciences, Faculty of Engineering, Faculty of Agriculture and Faculty of Theology, Şırnak Vocational School, Silopi Vocational School, Cizre Vocational School and İdil Vocational School, which were formed by changing their names and affiliations from being under the Dicle University Rectorate and are now affiliated with the Rectorate, and the newly established Institute of Social Sciences and Institute of Science, which are affiliated with the Rectorate.
