= Oier Ibarretxe =

Spanish boxer (2003)

Oier Ibarreche Conde (born 30 May 2003) is a Spanish boxer. He represented Spain at the 2024 Summer Olympics in the men's 63.5kg division. Ibarreche qualified for the Olympics by defeating American boxer Emilio Esteban Garcia by unanimous decision at the pre-Olympics qualifying tournament in Bangkok. At the Games, Ibarreche lost in his first match against Mukhammedsabyr Bazarbayuly of Kazakhstan.
