= Giordana Sorrentino =

Italian boxer (born 2000)

Personal information
- Nationality: Italian
- Born: 27 April 2000 (age 26) Rome, Italy

Sport
- Sport: Boxing
Medal record
Women's amateur boxing
Representing Italy
European Championships
Silver medal – second place	2022 Budva	Light flyweight
European Games
Bronze medal – third place	2023 Kraków-Małopolska	Light flyweight
Mediterranean Games
Gold medal – first place	2022 Oran	Light flyweight
World Military Boxing Championships
Silver medal – second place	2021 Moscow	Flyweight

Giordana Sorrentino (born 27 April 2000) is an Italian boxer. She competed in the women's flyweight event at the 2020 Summer Olympics held in Tokyo, Japan. She won the gold medal in the women's light flyweight event at the 2022 Mediterranean Games held in Oran, Algeria.

She competed in the bantamweight event at the 2019 AIBA Women's World Boxing Championships held in Ulan-Ude, Russia. She qualified at the 2020 European Boxing Olympic Qualification Tournament to compete at the 2020 Summer Olympics in Tokyo, Japan.

In 2022, she won the gold medal in her event at the European U22 Boxing Championships held in Poreč, Croatia. Two months later, she competed in the light flyweight event at the 2022 IBA Women's World Boxing Championships held in Istanbul, Turkey.
