= Pihla Kaivo-oja =

Romanian boxer (born 2002)

Personal information
- Nationality: Finnish
- Born: 27 October 2002 (age 24) Kangasala, Finland

Sport
- Sport: Boxing
Medal record
Women's amateur boxing
Representing Finland
European Boxing Championships
Silver medal – second place	2026 Sofia	54 kg

Pihla Kaivo-oja (born 27 October 2002) is a Finnish boxer. She represents the Tampereen Voimailuseura (Tampere Athletics Club).

The left-handed Kaivo-oja, who competes in the 50 kilogram weight class, won silver at the European Championship for under-22s in 2022 and bronze at the European Championships in 2021. She finished sixth in the World Championships for under-18s. She has won the women's Finnish championship in 2020, 2021, 2022 and 2023. Kaivo-oja has also competed in the Tammer Tournament, winning the tournament in 2022 and 2023. Kaivo-oja is coached by Maarit Teuronen. She participated in 2024 Summer Olympics in Paris which she lost to Buse Naz Çakıroğlu in the quarter-finals.

Before starting boxing, at the urging of her father, Kaivo-oja practiced team gymnastics, which she gave up after losing her motivation due to injuries. Before moving to Tampere, Kaivo-oja lived in Kangasala.
