= Laura Fuertes =

Spanish boxer (born 1999)

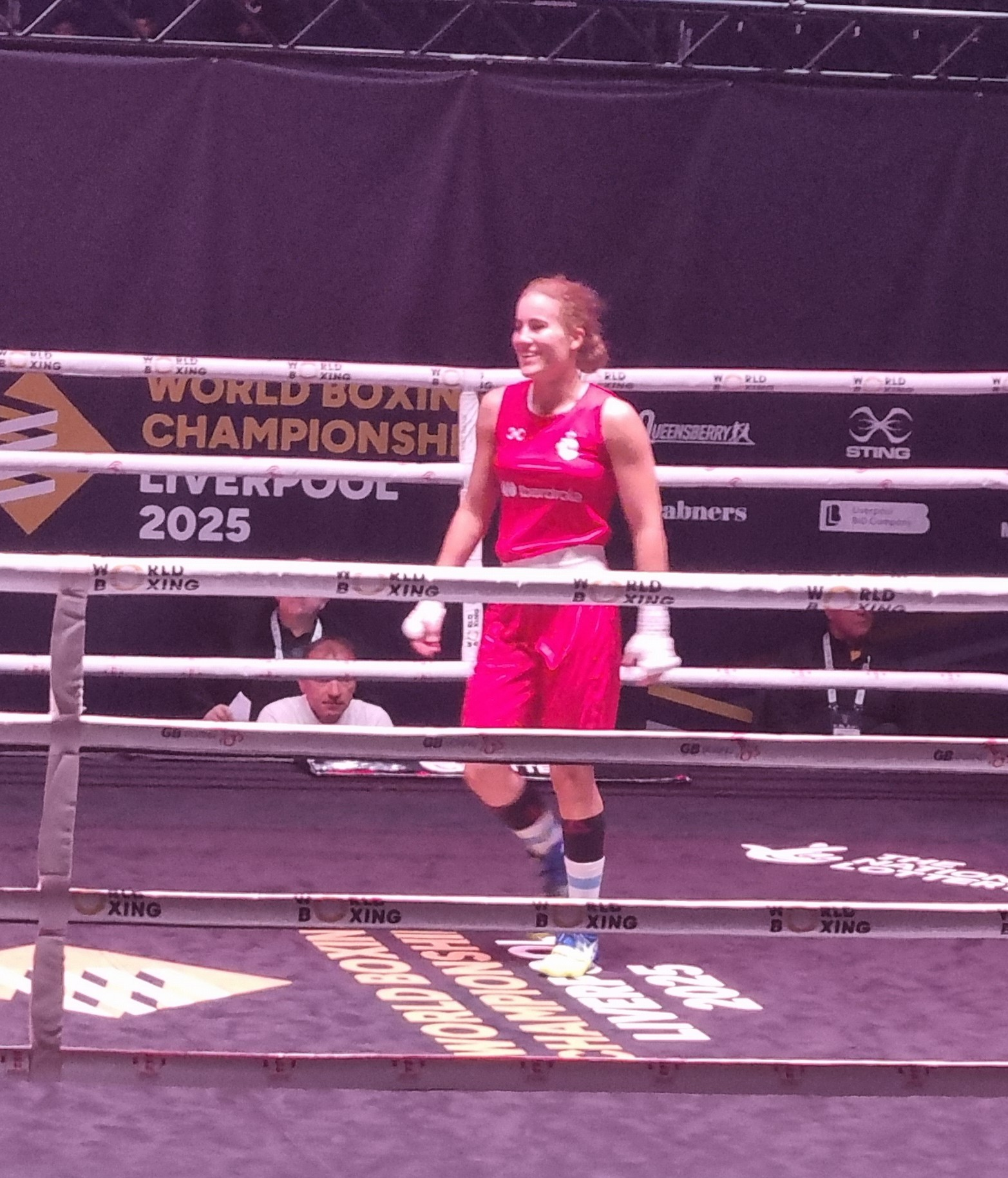
- 2025 World Boxing Championships

Personal information
- Nationality: Spain
- Born: Laura Fuertes Fernández; 29 April 1999 (age 27) Gijón, Asturias, Spain
- Height: 1.63 m (5 ft 4 in)

Boxing career
- Weight class: Light flyweight
- Stance: Orthodox
Medal record
Women's amateur boxing
Representing Spain
World Championships
Bronze medal – third place	2022 Istanbul	Light flyweight
European Games
Bronze medal – third place	2023 Kraków-Małopolska	Light flyweight
European Boxing Championships
Silver medal – second place	2026 Sofia	51 kg
Mediterranean Games
Gold medal – first place	2026 Taranto	Light flyweight
Bronze medal – third place	2022 Oran	Light flyweight

Laura Fuertes Fernández (Note: In this Spanish name, the first or paternal surname is Fuertes and the second or maternal family name is Fernández.) (born 29 April 1999) is a Spanish boxer. She competed at the 2022 IBA Women's World Boxing Championships, winning the bronze medal in the light flyweight division. She was the first Spanish boxer to win a World Championships medal.

She won a bronze medal in the light flyweight division at the 2022 Mediterranean Games held in Oran, Algeria.
