= Maxi Klötzer =

German boxer (born 2000)

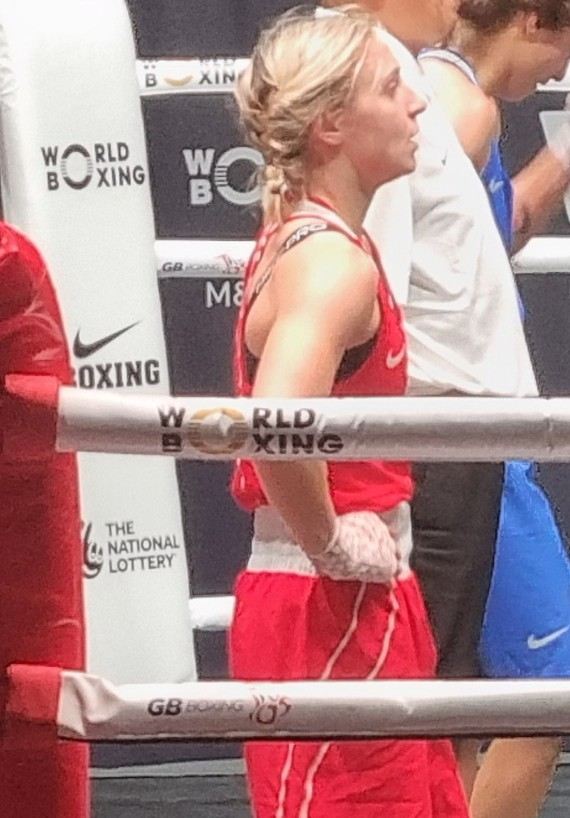
Maxi Klötzer at the 2025 World Boxing Championships

Maxi Carina Kloetzer (5 September 2000), also known as Klotzer, is a boxer from Germany. She takes part in women's 50 kg category. She lost to Indian boxer Nikhat Zareen in the round of 32 in the boxing at the 2024 Summer Olympics.

== Early life ==
Klotzer was born in Lichtenstein SA, Germany.

== Career ==
Klotzer won a gold in the inaugural World Boxing Cup at Cologne in October 2023. She qualified for the Olympics at Paris but lost to Indian boxer Nikhat Zareen in the round of 32.
