= 2025 IBA Women's World Boxing Championships – Light middleweight =

Light middleweight at the 2025 IBA Women's World Boxing Championships
- Venue: Sportski centar Čair
- Location: Niš, Serbia
- Dates: 10–14 March (preliminaries/semifinals); 16 March (final)
- Competitors: 17 from 17 nations

Medalists
gold medal	Elena Gapeshina	Russia
silver medal	Lisa O'Rourke	Ireland
bronze medal	Aryna Danilchyk	Belarus
bronze medal	Natalya Bogdanova	Kazakhstan

The Light middleweight competition at the 2025 IBA Women's World Boxing Championships was held from 12 to 16 March 2025.

== Results ==
=== Finals ===
Semi-finals
(Russia) Elena Gapeshina	5
(Belarus) Aryna Danilchyk	0
(Republic of Ireland) Lisa O'Rourke	4
(Kazakhstan) Natalya Bogdanova	3

Final
(Russia) Elena Gapeshina	5
(Republic of Ireland) Lisa O'Rourke	0

=== Top half ===
==== Section 1 ====
Round of 32
(Mexico) Darianne Hernández	0
(Turkey) Sema Çalışkan	5

Round of 16
(Australia) Kaye Scott	0
(Turkey) Sema Çalışkan	5
(Sweden) Zabrina Holmström	0
(Russia) Elena Gapeshina	5

Quarterfinals
(Turkey) Sema Çalışkan	0
(Russia) Elena Gapeshina	5

==== Section 2 ====
Round of 32

Round of 16
(Vietnam) Hoàng Ngọc Mai	4
(Venezuela) Genesis Palma	1
(South Africa) Samukelisiwe Ncube
(Belarus) Aryna Danilchyk	w/o

Quarterfinals
(Vietnam) Hoàng Ngọc Mai	1
(Belarus) Aryna Danilchyk	4

=== Bottom half ===
==== Section 3 ====
Round of 32

Round of 16
(Morocco) Saida Lahmidi	RSC
(Uzbekistan) Oysha Toirova
(Azerbaijan) Emili Rzayeva
(Republic of Ireland) Lisa O'Rourke	RSC

Quarterfinals
(Morocco) Saida Lahmidi	0
(Republic of Ireland) Lisa O'Rourke	5

==== Section 4 ====
Round of 32

Round of 16
(Serbia) Milena Matović	5
(China) Li Shu	0
(Spain) Dunia Martínez
(Kazakhstan) Natalya Bogdanova	RSC-I

Quarterfinals
(Serbia) Milena Matović	3
(Kazakhstan) Natalya Bogdanova	4
