= 2025 World Boxing Championships – Women's 70 kg =

Competition at amateur boxing tournament

Women's 70 kg at the 2025 World Boxing Championships
- Venue: Liverpool Arena
- Location: Liverpool, England
- Dates: 4–14 September
- Competitors: 19 from 19 nations

Medalists
gold medal	Natalya Bogdanova	Kazakhstan
silver medal	Lekeisha Pergoliti	Australia
bronze medal	Aziza Zokirova	Uzbekistan
bronze medal	Chantelle Reid	England

The Women's 70 kg competition at the 2025 World Boxing Championships was held from 4 to 14 September 2025.

== Results ==
=== Final ===
Final; 14 September
Lekeisha Pergoliti (AUS)	0
Natalya Bogdanova (KAZ)	5

=== Top half ===
Preliminaries; 4 September
Patricia Mbata (NGR)	0
Bárbara Maria dos Santos (BRA)	5

Round of 16; 7 September
Lekeisha Pergoliti (AUS)	3
Bárbara Maria dos Santos (BRA)	2
Shirleidis Orozco (COL)	0
Lisa O'Rourke (IRL)	5
Regina Lakos (HUN)
Aziza Zokirova (UZB)	RSC
Darianne Hernández (MEX)	0
Leonie Müller (GER)	5

Quarter-finals; 9 September
Lekeisha Pergoliti (AUS)	3
Lisa O'Rourke (IRL)	2
Aziza Zokirova (UZB)	5
Leonie Müller (GER)	0

Semi-finals; 13 September
Lekeisha Pergoliti (AUS)	5
Aziza Zokirova (UZB)	0

=== Bottom half ===
Preliminaries; 4 September
Morgan Henderson (NZL)	0
Chantelle Reid (ENG)	5
Sanamacha Chanu (IND)	4
Ditte Frostholm (DEN)	1

Round of 16; 7 September
Barbara Marcinkowska (POL)	2
Chantelle Reid (ENG)	3
Anastasiia Chernokolenko (UKR)	0
Zhang Mengge (CHN)	5
Isabella Winkler (USA)	2
Sema Çalışkan (TUR)	3
Sanamacha Chanu (IND)	0
Natalya Bogdanova (KAZ)	5

Quarter-finals; 9 September
Chantelle Reid (ENG)	5
Zhang Mengge (CHN)	0
Sema Çalışkan (TUR)	0
Natalya Bogdanova (KAZ)	5

Semi-finals; 13 September
Chantelle Reid (ENG)	2
Natalya Bogdanova (KAZ)	3
