= Boxing at the 2026 Commonwealth Games – Women's 70 kg =

Boxing competitions

Boxing – Women's 70 kg at the 2026 Commonwealth Games
- Venue: SEC Centre
- Dates: 29 July – 1 August 2026
- Competitors: 8 from 8 nations

Medalists
gold medal	Arundhati Choudhary	India
silver medal	Chantelle Reid	England
bronze medal	Rosie Eccles	Wales
bronze medal	Lekeisha Pergoliti	Australia

The women's 70 kg boxing competitions at the 2026 Commonwealth Games in Glasgow, Scotland took place between July 28 and August 1 at the SEC Centre.

Like all Commonwealth boxing events, the competition was a straight single-elimination tournament. Both semifinal losers were awarded bronze medals, so no boxers competed again after their first loss. Bouts consisted of three rounds of three minutes each, with one-minute breaks between rounds.

== Schedule ==
The schedule was as follows:

Date	Round
Wednesday 29 July	Quarter-finals
Friday 31 July	Semi-finals
Saturday 1 August	Final

== Results ==
The draw was as follows:

=== Bracket ===
Quarterfinals
29 July
Morgan Henderson (NZL)	1
Arundhati Choudhary (IND)	3
29 July
Rosie Eccles (WAL)	RSC
Samukilisiwe Ncube (RSA)
29 July
Blessing Orakwe (NGR)	2
Lekeisha Pergoliti (AUS)	3
29 July
Jansseen Hill (NIR)	0
Chantelle Reid (ENG)	5

Semifinal
31 July
Arundhati Choudhary (IND)	4
Rosie Eccles (WAL)	0
31 July
Lekeisha Pergoliti (AUS)	0
Chantelle Reid (ENG)	5

Gold medal match
1 August
Arundhati Choudhary (IND)	5
Chantelle Reid (ENG)	0
