= 2023 IBA Women's World Boxing Championships – Light middleweight =

Light middleweight at the 2023 IBA Women's World Boxing Championships
- Venue: K. D. Jadhav Indoor Hall
- Location: New Delhi, India
- Dates: 17–25 March
- Competitors: 19 from 19 nations

Medalists
gold medal	Anastasiia Demurchian	Russia
silver medal	Kaye Scott	Australia
bronze medal	Zhou Pan	China
bronze medal	Bárbara Santos	Brazil

The Light middleweight competition at the 2023 IBA Women's World Boxing Championships was held between 17 and 25 March 2023.

== Results ==
=== Finals ===
Semi-finals
(China) Zhou Pan	0
(Russia) Anastasiia Demurchian	5
(Brazil) Bárbara Santos	3
(Australia) Kaye Scott	4

Final
(Russia) Anastasiia Demurchian	5
(Australia) Kaye Scott	0

=== Top half ===
==== Section 1 ====
Round of 32
(China) Zhou Pan	5
(India) Shruti Yadav	0

Round of 16
(Armenia) Ani Hovsepyan	0
(China) Zhou Pan	5
(Colombia) Luisa Vásquez	5
(Kenya) Lorna Kusa	0

Quarterfinals
(China) Zhou Pan	5
(Colombia) Luisa Vásquez	0

==== Section 2 ====
Round of 32

Round of 16
(Russia) Anastasiia Demurchian	5
(Uzbekistan) Aziza Zokirova	0
(French Polynesia) Edith Tavanae
(Algeria) Ichrak Chaib	RSC

Quarterfinals
(Russia) Anastasiia Demurchian	5
(Algeria) Ichrak Chaib	0

=== Bottom half ===
==== Section 3 ====
Round of 32
(Serbia) Nikolina Gajić	5
(Nepal) Saraswati Rana	0

Round of 16
(Brazil) Bárbara Santos	4
(Serbia) Nikolina Gajić	1
(South Korea) Choi Hong-eun	0
(Kazakhstan) Madina Nurshayeva	3

Quarterfinals
(Brazil) Bárbara Santos	3
(Kazakhstan) Madina Nurshayeva	1

==== Section 4 ====
Round of 32
(Mexico) Jocelyn García	4
(Turkey) Zehra Ceren Tuncer	1

Round of 16
(Hungary) Regina Lakos	0
(Mozambique) Alcinda Panguana	5
(Mexico) Jocelyn García
(Australia) Kaye Scott	RSC

Quarterfinals
(Mozambique) Alcinda Panguana	2
(Australia) Kaye Scott	5
