= Natalya Bogdanova =

Kazakhstani boxer (born 1999)

Personal information
- Nationality: Kazakhstani
- Born: 28 July 1999 (age 27) Petropavl, Kazakhstan

Boxing career
- Weight class: Light middleweight Welterweight
- Reach: 1.75 m (69 in)
Medal record
Women's amateur boxing
Representing Kazakhstan
World Championships
| Gold medal – first place | 2025 Liverpool | 70 kg |
IBA World Championships
| Bronze medal – third place | 2025 Nis | Light middleweight |
Asian Games
| Bronze medal – third place | 2022 Hangzhou | 66 kg |
| Bronze medal – third place | 2026 Aichi–Nagoya | 75 kg |

Natalya Sergeyevna Bogdanova (Russian: Наталья Сергеевна Богданова; born 28 July 1999) is a Kazakhstani boxer and kickboxer. She is a gold medalist at the World Boxing Championships, bronze medalist of the IBA World Championships, two-time bronze medalist of the Asian Games, multiple winner and prize winner of international and national amateur tournaments.

== Early life ==
Natalya Sergeyevna Bogdanova was born on 28 July 1999 in Petropavl, in the North Kazakhstan Region of Kazakhstan. She lost her mother very early, so her grandmother raised her, which strengthened her character.

== Amateur career ==
In 2019, Bogdanova became a Master of Sports of Kazakhstan in kickboxing. She is a multiple prize winner of the national boxing championship and multiple winner of international and national tournaments in the weight category up to 66 kg.

In October 2023, Bogdanova became a bronze medalist at the 2022 Asian Games held in Hangzhou, China, in the 66 kg category. In the quarterfinals, she defeated Myagmarsürengiin Tsetsegdari by unanimous decision, but in the semifinals, having been knocked down three times, she lost to Janjaem Suwannapheng early by technical knockout.

Bogdanova competed in the light middleweight category of the 2025 IBA World Championships held in Niš, Serbia. She defeated Dunia Martínez in the round of 16, Milena Matović in the quarterfinals and lost to Lisa O'Rourke in the semifinals.

Bogdanova competed in the 70 kg category of the 2025 World Boxing Championships held in Liverpool, England. She defeated Sanamacha Chanu in the round of 16, Sema Çalışkan in the quarterfinals and Chantelle Reid in the semifinals. In the final match, she defeated Lekeisha Pergoliti 5–0.

At the 2026 Asian Games in Nagoya, Bogdanova won a bronze medal in the women's 75 kg weight category after losing to Lovlina Borgohain in the semifinals.
