= Boxing at the 2026 Asian Games – Women's 75 kg =

Women's 75 kg at the 2026 Asian Games
- Venue: Nishio City Gymnasium
- Dates: 28 September – 2 October 2026
- Competitors: 8 from 8 nations

Medalists
gold medal	Lovlina Borgohain	India
silver medal	Bao Ziyi	China
bronze medal	Lưu Diễm Quỳnh	Vietnam
bronze medal	Natalya Bogdanova	Kazakhstan

The women's 75 kilograms event at the 2026 Asian Games took place from 28 September to 2 October 2026 at the Nishio City Gymnasium, Nishio, Aichi Prefecture, Japan.

The competition was a straight single-elimination tournament. Both semifinal losers were awarded bronze medals, so no boxers competed again after their first loss.

== Schedule ==
All times are Japan Standard Time (UTC+09:00)

Date	Time	Event
Monday, 28 September 2026	13:00	Quarterfinals
Wednesday, 30 September 2026	14:00	Semifinals
Friday, 2 October 2026	13:30	Final

== Results ==
Quarterfinals		Semifinals		Final
Bao Ziyi (CHN)	5
Porntip Buapa (THA)	0	Bao Ziyi (CHN)	5
Lưu Diễm Quỳnh (VIE)	5	Lưu Diễm Quỳnh (VIE)	0
Parmida Khoshkhabar (IRI)	0			Bao Ziyi (CHN)	0
Seong Su-yeon (KOR)	0			Lovlina Borgohain (IND)	5
Lovlina Borgohain (IND)	5	Lovlina Borgohain (IND)	3
Natalya Bogdanova (KAZ)	4	Natalya Bogdanova (KAZ)	2
Aziza Zokirova (UZB)	1
