= 2016 AIBA Women's World Boxing Championships – Heavyweight =

Boxing competitions

Heavyweight at the 2016 AIBA Women's World Boxing Championships
- Dates: 23–27 May
- Competitors: 12 from 12 nations

Medalists
gold medal	Lazzat Kungeibayeva	Kazakhstan
silver medal	Shadasia Green	United States
bronze medal	Sennur Demir	Turkey
bronze medal	Wang Shijin	China

The Heavyweight (75 kg) competition at the 2016 AIBA Women's World Boxing Championships was held from 23 to 27 May 2016.

== Draw ==
Round of 16
23 May
(United States) Shadasia Green	3
(Romania) Elena Turcin	0
23 May
(Turkey) Sennur Demir	3
(Lithuania) Iveta Lešinskytė	0
23 May
(Uzbekistan) Guzal Ismatova	0
(China) Wang Shijin	3
23 May
(Azerbaijan) Aynur Rzayeva	0
(India) Seema Poonia	3

Quarterfinals
24 May
(Russia) Zenfira Magomedalieva	1
(United States) Shadasia Green	2
24 May
(Turkey) Sennur Demir	TKO
(Ukraine) Iryna Vynnyk
24 May
(Hungary) Ágnes Markó
(China) Wang Shijin	TKO
24 May
(India) Seema Poonia	0
(Kazakhstan) Lazzat Kungeibayeva	3

Semifinals
26 May
(United States) Shadasia Green	3
(Turkey) Sennur Demir	0
26 May
(China) Wang Shijin	0
(Kazakhstan) Lazzat Kungeibayeva	3

Final
27 May
(United States) Shadasia Green	0
(Kazakhstan) Lazzat Kungeibayeva	3
