= Olivia Curry =

American boxer (born 1989)

Personal information
- Born: Olivia Rose Curry; 27 November 1989 (age 36) Iowa City, Iowa, U.S.
- Height: 175 cm (5 ft 9 in)
- Weight: Middleweight, Super-middleweight

Boxing career
- Stance: Orthodox

Boxing record
- Total fights: 12
- Wins: 7
- Win by KO: 2
- Losses: 3
- Draws: 2

Olivia Curry (born 27 November 1989) is an American professional boxer. She has twice fought for the WBC and WBA female middleweight titles.

== Career ==
While studying film and French at Northwestern University, Curry joined a Muay Thai group, but when she was unable to get matched for a fight, she turned to boxing and entered the Chicago Golden Gloves instead, going on to have 30 amateur bouts.

After campaigning at middleweight and accruing a professional record of seven wins and one loss, Curry moved up to super-middleweight to fight future world champion Shadasia Green on the undercard of Jake Paul vs. Nate Diaz at the American Airlines Center in Dallas, Texas, on 5 August 2023. She lost the 10-round bout by unanimous decision.

Returning to middleweight, her next fight was against Melody Popravak at Miccosukee Indian Gaming Resort in Miami, Florida, on 27 April 2024. The six-round encounter ended in a split draw.

Curry faced Kaye Scott for the vacant WBC and WBA female middleweight titles at Fox Theater in Detroit, Michigan, on 19 September 2025. The fight ended in a majority draw with one judge scoring it 98–92 for Scott and the other two a 95–95 draw.

A rematch between Curry and Scott for the vacant WBA and WBC female middleweight titles took place on 20 December 2025, once again at the Fox Theater in Detroit on 20 December 2025. Curry lost by majority decision with two of the judges favouring her opponent 98–92 and 97–93 respectively while the third scored the bout a 95–95 draw.

== Personal life ==
Outside of boxing, Curry works as a professional film editor and director for a production company in Chicago.
