= Lekeisha Pergoliti =

Australian boxer (born 2002)

Personal information
- Nationality: Australian
- Born: 20 April 2002 (age 24) Bunbury, Western Australia, Australia

Boxing career
Medal record
Women's amateur boxing
Representing Australia
World Championships
Silver medal – second place	2025 Liverpool	70 kg

Lekeisha Pergoliti (born 20 April 2002) is an Australian boxer. She is a silver medalist at the World Boxing Championships, having done so in the 2025 edition 70 kg category.

== Early life ==
Pergoliti was born on 20 April 2002 in Bunbury, Western Australia. She was born to parents of Italian ancestry and has a younger sister. At the age of 11, she took up soccer and basketball and three years later, she took up boxing. Around this time, she had broken her ankle, which led her to focus on boxing.

== Amateur career ==
In 2018, Pergoliti won the state, national, and National Golden Gloves titles at the junior and youth levels. The following year, she would repeat this feat while in the women's welterweight category. She won the state title once more in 2022, this time at the Elite Senior level.

Pergoliti competed in the 70 kg category of the 2025 World Boxing Championships held in Liverpool, England. She defeated Bárbara Maria dos Santos in the round of 16, Lisa O'Rourke in the quarterfinals and Aziza Zokirova in the semifinals. In the gold medal match, she lost to Natalya Bogdanova 5-0.
