= Anastasiia Demurchian =

Italian boxer (born 2004)

Personal information
- Nationality: Russian
- Born: 13 June 2004 (age 22) Anapa, Krasnodar Krai, Russia
- Weight: Light middleweight (70 kg); Middleweight (75 kg)

Boxing career
Medal record
Women's amateur boxing
Representing Russia
IBA World Championships
| Gold medal – first place | 2023 New Delhi | Light middleweight |
European Boxing Championships
| Silver medal – second place | 2026 Sofia | 80 kg |

Anastasiia Sergeevna Demurchian (Russian: Анастасия Сергеевна Демурчян, born 13 June 2004) is a Russian amateur boxer of Armenian origin. She is a 2022 Russian national champion, 2023 World champion, and International Master of Sport in boxing.

== Background ==
She was born and raised in Anapa, Krasnodar Krai, Russia, into an Armenian and Russian family.

== Amateur boxing career ==
In 2022, she won senior Russian nationals. In March 2023, she became a world champion in the light middleweight division (70 kg), in the final match she beat Australian Kaye Scott. In November 2023, she won the silver medal at the Russian championships held in Ufa, Bashkortostan. One year later, Anastasiia was runner-up at the national championships in the middleweight division.

== Achievements ==
- 2022 Russian championship — 1st
- 2023, 2024 Russian championship — 2nd
- 2023 World Championships — 1st
