= 2026 European Boxing Championships – Women's 70 kg =

Women's 70 kg at the 2026 European Boxing Championships
- Venue: Asics Arena
- Location: Sofia, Bulgaria
- Dates: 18–25 September
- Competitors: 18 from 18 nations

Medalists
gold medal	Busenaz Sürmeneli	Turkey
silver medal	Chantelle Reid	England
bronze medal	Milena Matović	Serbia
bronze medal	Nadezhda Golubeva	Russia

The women's 70 kg competition at the 2026 European Boxing Championships was held from 18 to 25 September 2026.

== Results ==
=== Final ===
Final; 25 September
(England) Chantelle Reid	0
(Turkey) Busenaz Sürmeneli	5

=== Top half ===
Round of 32; 18 September
(Romania) Amalia Niță	2
(Denmark) Ditte Frostholm	3

Round of 16; 20 September
(England) Chantelle Reid	5
(Denmark) Ditte Frostholm	0
(Republic of Ireland) Evelyn Igharo	5
(Belarus) Aryna Danilchyk	0
(France) Maëlys Richol	0
(Serbia) Milena Matović	5
(Netherlands) Luna Beeloo	4
(Ukraine) Anastasiia Chernokolenko	0

Quarterfinals; 22 September
(England) Chantelle Reid	5
(Republic of Ireland) Evelyn Igharo	0
(Serbia) Milena Matović	4
(Netherlands) Luna Beeloo	1

Semifinals; 23 September
(England) Chantelle Reid	3
(Serbia) Milena Matović	2

=== Bottom half ===
Round of 32; 18 September
(Slovakia) Jessica Triebeľová	5
(Latvia) Kitija Zarberga	0

Round of 16; 20 September
(Poland) Barbara Marcinkowska	5
(Greece) Elisavet Konstantinidou	0
(Italy) Chiara Saraiello	0
(Russia) Nadezhda Golubeva	5
(Turkey) Busenaz Sürmeneli	5
(Spain) Dúnia Martínez	0
(Slovakia) Jessica Triebeľová	0
(Germany) Leonie Müller	5

Quarterfinals; 22 September
(Poland) Barbara Marcinkowska
(Russia) Nadezhda Golubeva	RSC
(Turkey) Busenaz Sürmeneli	5
(Germany) Leonie Müller	0

Semifinals; 23 September
(Russia) Nadezhda Golubeva	2
(Turkey) Busenaz Sürmeneli	3
