= Chantelle Reid =

English boxer (born 1998)

Chantelle Reid OLY
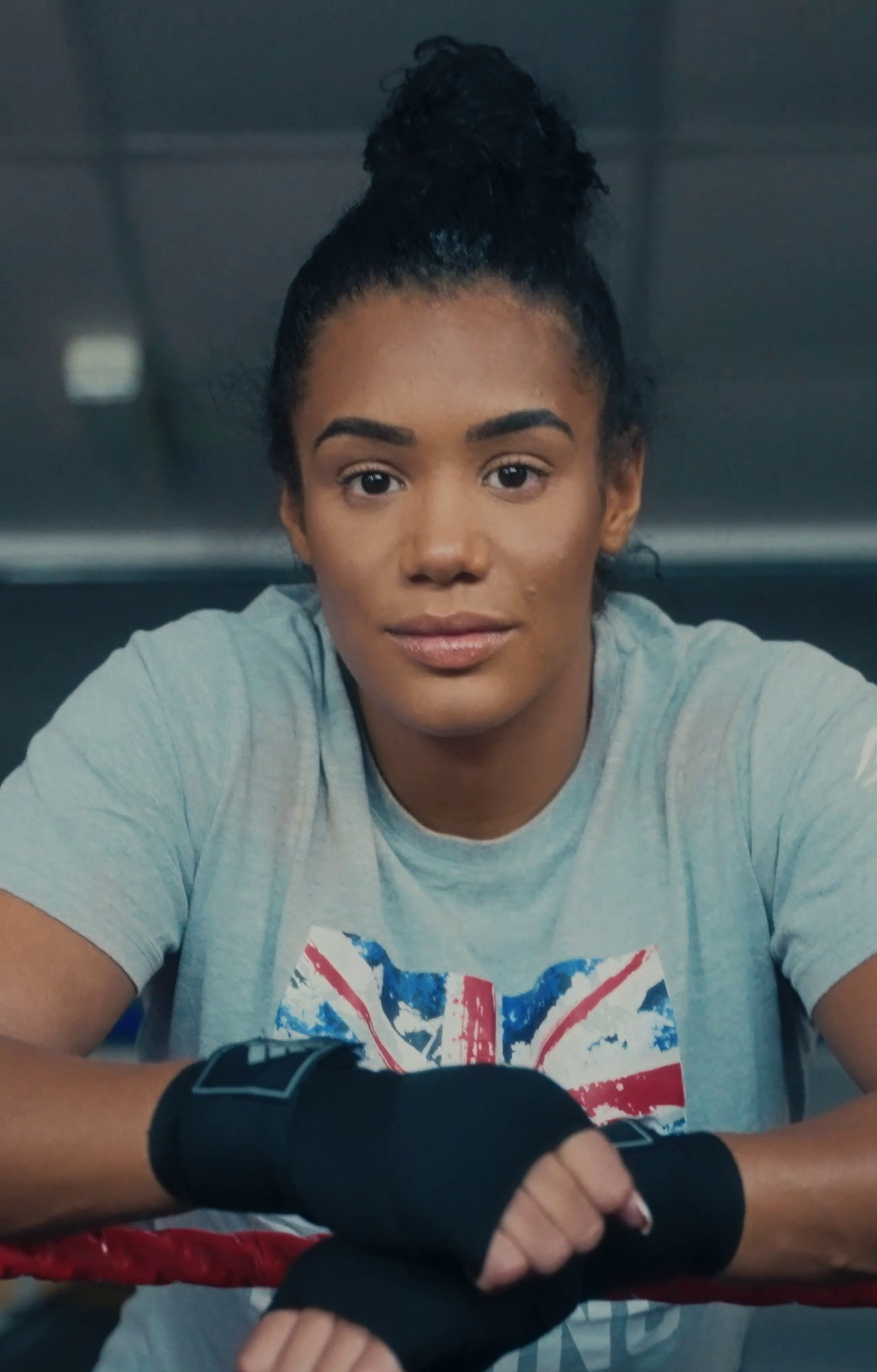
- Reid in 2024

Personal information
- Full name: Chantelle Jordan Reid
- Born: 31 May 1998 (age 28) Allenton, Derbyshire, England

Sport
- Sport: Boxing
- Weight class: Middleweight, Light-middleweight
- Club: Kode Red Boxing
Medal record
Women's amateur boxing
Representing England
World Championships
Bronze medal – third place	2025 Liverpool	70 kg
European Championships
Silver medal – second place	2026 Sofia	70 kg
Commonwealth Games
Silver medal – second place	2026 Glasgow	70 kg

Chantelle Jordan Reid OLY (born 31 May 1998) is an English amateur boxer. She won a bronze medal in the 70 kg division at the 2025 World Boxing Championships and represented Great Britain at the 2024 Summer Olympics.

== Career ==
Reid won a gold medal at the 2014 European Junior Boxing Championship and bronze a year later at the World Youth Championship before a back injury forced her to quit the sport for six years.

Upon returning to the ring she claimed an England Boxing National Amateur Championships title in 2023 and was subsequently awarded a place on the GB Boxing podium squad.

In March 2024, Reid secured a quota spot for the 2024 Summer Olympics in Paris when she defeated Uzbekistan's Aziza Zokirova by unanimous decision in the quarter-finals at the World Qualification Tournament 1 in Busto Arsizio, Italy.

On 7 June 2024, Reid was officially announced among the Great Britain squad for the Olympics as the country's entrant in the women's 75kg division. She was drawn to fight 2023 IBA World champion Khadija Mardi from Morocco in the first round and lost on a 3:2 split decision.

Reid was chosen to represent England in the 70 kg division at the 2025 World Championships in Liverpool. In her opening bout she defeated Morgan Henderson from New Zealand by unanimous decision, before overcoming Poland’s Barbara Marcinkowska via split decision in the second round. Reid beat Chinese boxer Mengge Zhang by unanimous decision in the quarter-finals. She lost to Kazakhstan's Natalya Bogdanova via 3:2 split decision in the semi-finals and was therefore awarded a bronze medal.

She was selected to represent England at the 2026 Commonwealth Games in Glasgow, Scotland. Competing in the 70 kg division, Reid won a silver medal after losing to India's Arundhati Choudhary in the final.

At the 2026 European Championships in Sofia, Bulgaria, Reid won the silver medal in the 70 kg division, recording unanimous decision successes over Ditte Frostholm from Denmark and Evelyn Igharo of Ireland, before defeating Serbia's Milena Matović 3:2 to reach the final, where she lost to 2020 Olympic gold medalist and three-time world champion, Busenaz Sürmeneli, from Turkey via unanimous decision.
