= Jake Paul vs. Mike Tyson =

2024 professional boxing match

- Date: November 15, 2024
- Venue: AT&T Stadium, Arlington, Texas, U.S.

Tale of the tape
Boxer	Jake Paul	Mike Tyson
Nickname	El Gallo ("The Rooster")	Iron
Hometown	Cleveland, Ohio, U.S.	Catskill, New York, U.S.
Pre-fight record	10–1 (7 KOs)	50–6 (2) (44 KOs)
Age	27 years, 9 months	58 years, 4 months
Height	6 ft 1 in (1.85 m)	5 ft 10 in (1.78 m)
Weight	227.2 lb (103.06 kg)	228.4 lb (103.6 kg)
Style	Orthodox	Orthodox
Recognition		Former undisputed heavyweight champion

Result
- Paul wins via 8-round unanimous decision (80–72, 79–73, 79–73)

Jake Paul vs. Mike Tyson was a heavyweight professional boxing match between YouTuber-turned-boxer Jake Paul and former undisputed heavyweight world champion Mike Tyson. The bout took place on November 15, 2024, at the AT&T Stadium in Arlington, Texas, and was streamed globally on Netflix, with 65 million concurrent viewers making it the most-streamed sporting event ever at the time. Paul defeated Tyson via unanimous decision.

Originally, the bout was scheduled to take place on July 20 but was postponed due to Tyson suffering an ulcer flare-up aboard a plane.

== Background ==
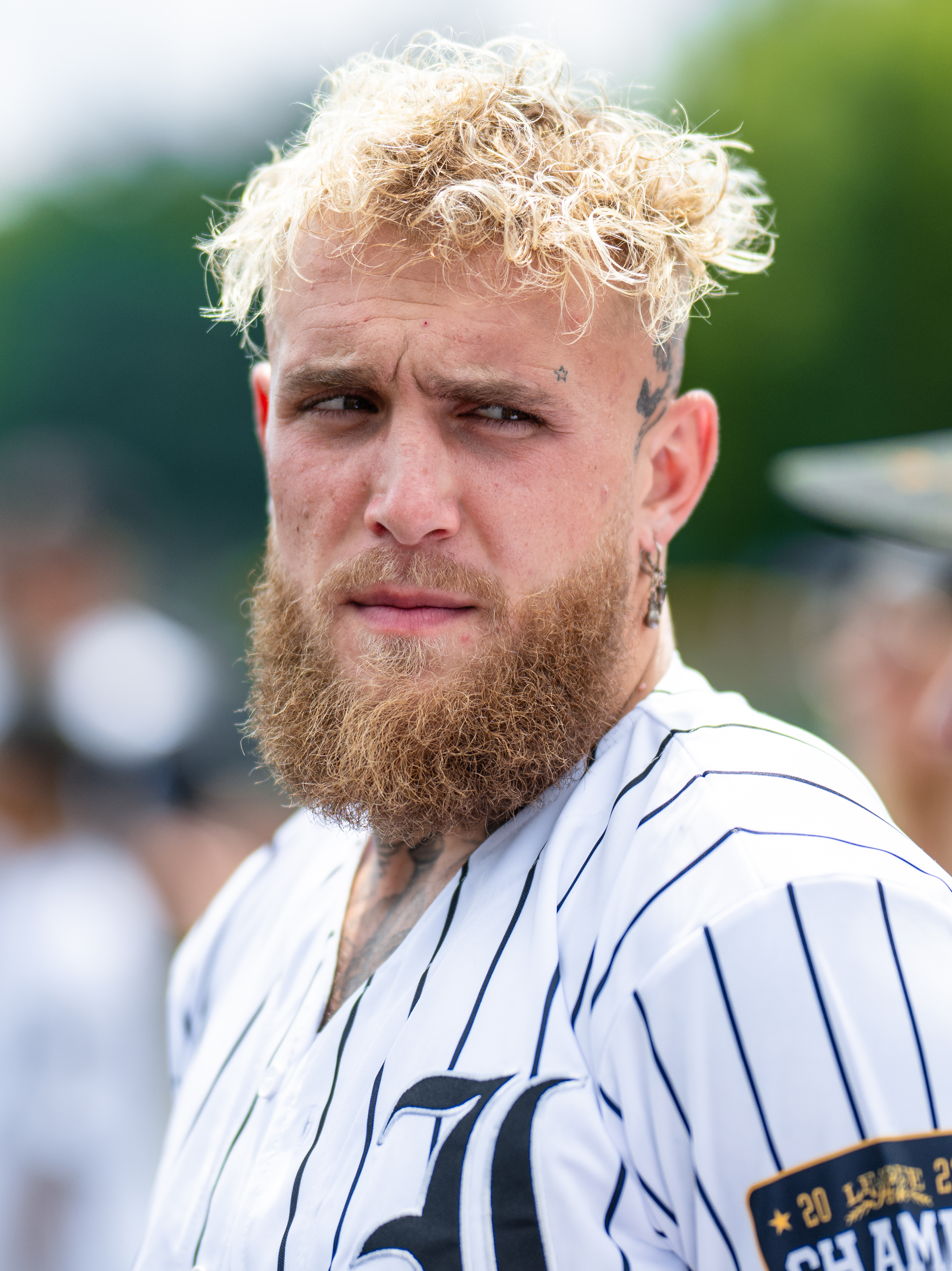
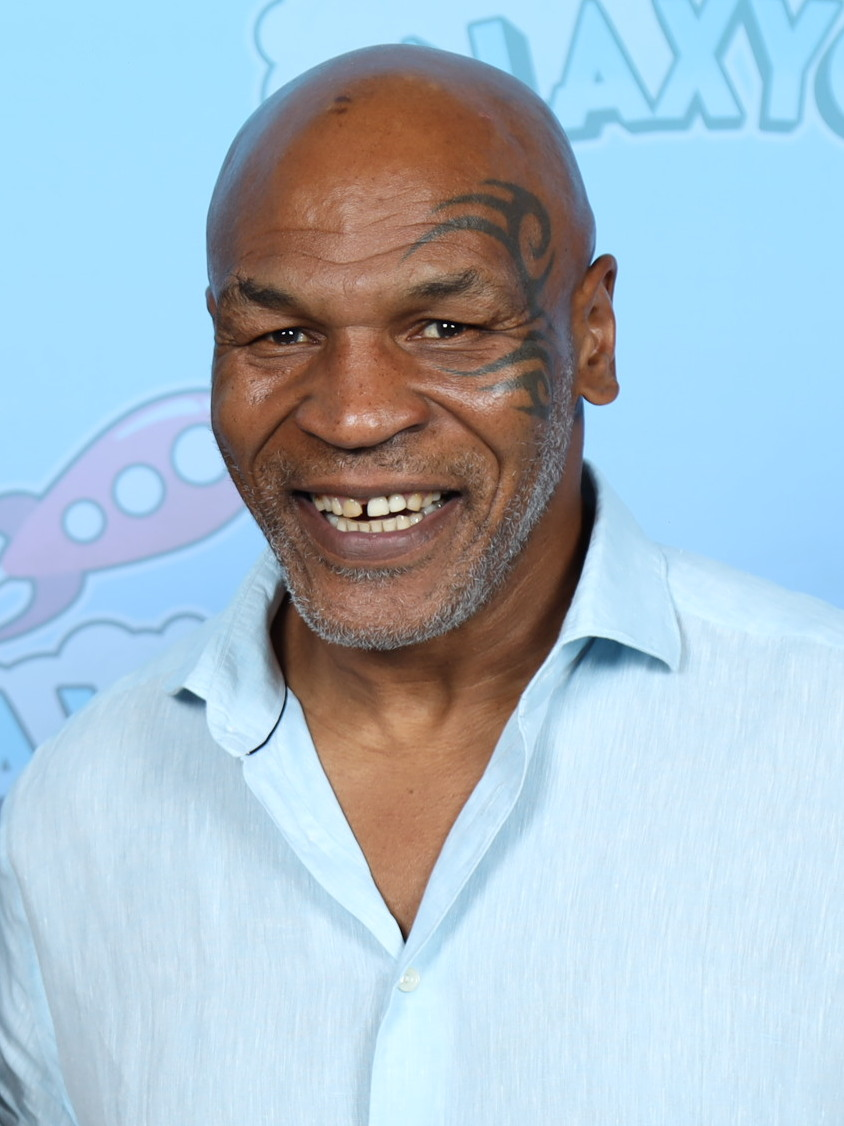
Jake Paul (left) and Mike Tyson (right)

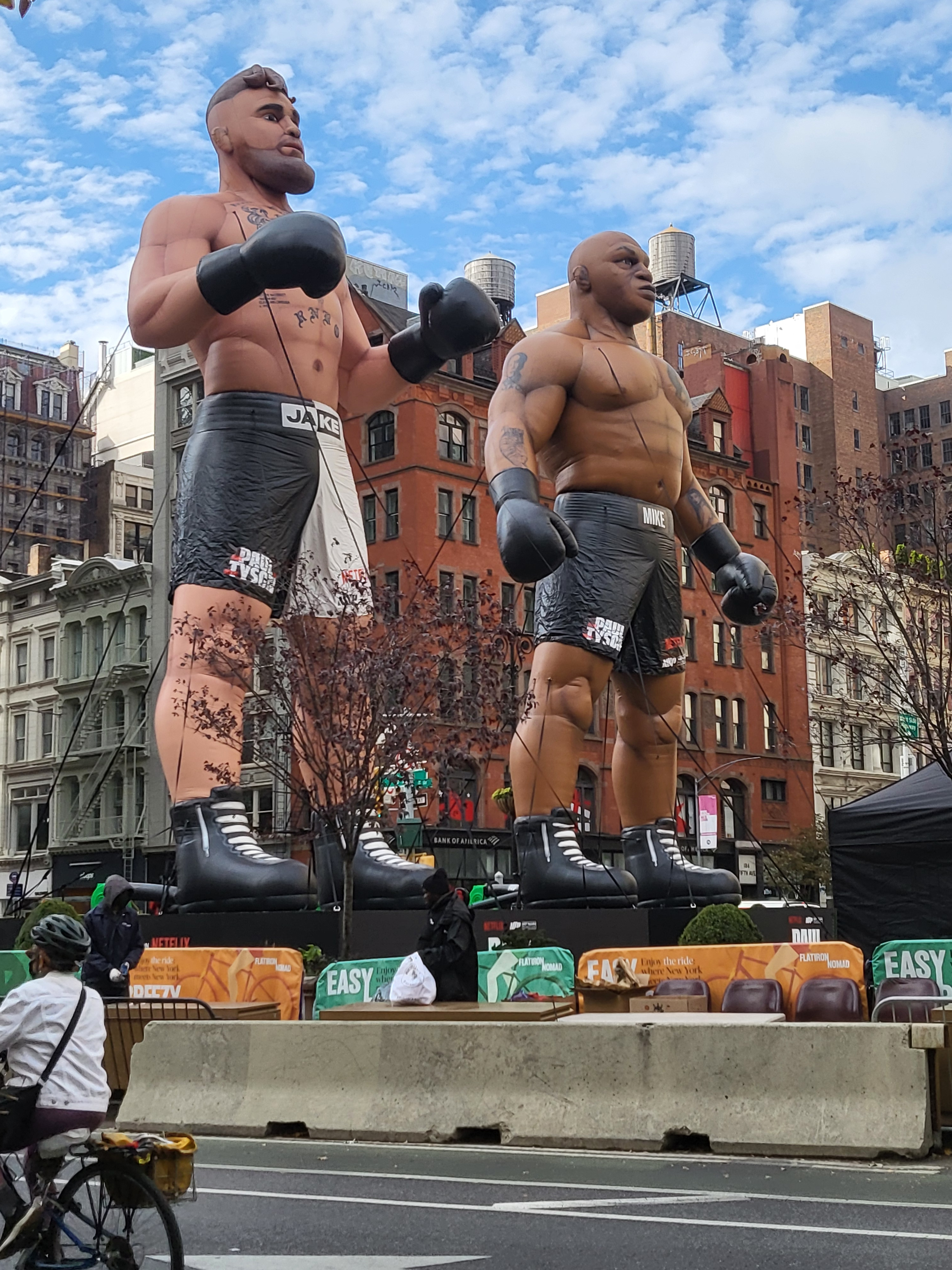
Broadway, New York, November 2024

On November 3, 2023, it was reported that Netflix was considering streaming a boxing match involving Jake Paul on their service.

On March 7, 2024, Netflix and Most Valuable Promotions announced that they were partnering to host an event headlined by Paul facing former undisputed heavyweight world champion Mike Tyson on July 20 at the AT&T Stadium in Arlington, Texas. On April 2, Tyson confirmed at the time the bout was sanctioned as an exhibition bout. On April 10, Paul confirmed that they would be submitting a request to the Texas Combative Sports Program for the bout to be sanctioned as a professional bout. On April 29, the Texas Department of Licensing and Regulations confirmed it approved the fighters' request and that the bout would be a sanctioned, professional fight.

On May 31, Netflix announced that the event had been postponed due to Tyson suffering a ulcer flare up while boarding a plane. Paul took to X (formerly known as Twitter) to call out his rival and fellow YouTuber-turned-professional boxer KSI to replace Tyson. KSI responded and declined the offer stating he has a bout scheduled in August. On June 7, Netflix confirmed the event was rescheduled to November 15.

=== Pre-fight press conferences ===
Three pre-fight press conferences were held in the following cities:

- May 13 – Apollo Theater, Manhattan, New York, U.S.
- August 18 – Javits Center, New York City, U.S.
- November 13 – Toyota Music Factory, Irving, Texas, U.S.

During the final press conference, Tyson slapped Paul after Paul stepped on his toe during their face-off.

=== Countdown: Paul vs. Tyson ===
On October 24, Netflix announced an original documentary series titled Countdown: Paul vs. Tyson would premier its first two episodes on November 7 and the final episode on November 12. The series debuted at number 4 on Netflix's Global Top 10, with 4.4 million viewers. Each episode was narrated by Ice-T.

=== Broadcast ===
Deadline later reported, citing independent viewership estimates from research firm PlumResearch, that the fight generated an estimated 78 million viewers across international markets during its first 48 hours on the platform.

=== Undercard ===
On April 16, Netflix announced that the long-awaited rematch between Katie Taylor and Amanda Serrano for the WBA, WBC, IBF, WBO, and The Ring female light-welterweight titles would be the co-feature bout. On May 21, Netflix announced that Indian professional boxer Neeraj Goyat would face Brazilian internet personality Whindersson Nunes. On September 16, a bout between Mario Barrios and Abel Ramos for the WBC welterweight championship was announced.

Originally, before postponing the event, Aston Sylve was scheduled to face Floyd Schofield but was not rescheduled after Sylve lost via knockout on the Jake Paul vs. Mike Perry event. Former mixed martial artist Darren Till was originally scheduled to face former WBC middleweight boxing champion Julio César Chávez Jr.

=== Commentary ===
Rosie Perez, Roy Jones Jr. and broadcaster Mauro Ranallo on the ring and Andre Ward, Cedric the Entertainer and Kate Scott were on desk.

== Fight card ==
Weight Class		vs.		Method	Round	Min	Time	Notes
Main Card (Netflix)
Heavyweight	Jake Paul	def.	Mike Tyson	UD	8	2:00		^{Note 1}
Lightweight	Katie Taylor (c)	def.	Amanda Serrano	UD	10	2:00		^{Note 2}
Welterweight	Mario Barrios (c)	vs.	Abel Ramos	SD	12	3:00		^{Note 3}
Super middleweight	Neeraj Goyat	def.	Whindersson Nunes	UD	6	3:00
Preliminary Card (Netflix Sports YouTube channel)
Super middleweight	Shadasia Green	def.	Melinda Watpool	SD	10	2:00		^{Note 4}
Lightweight	Lucas Bahdi	def.	Armando Casamonica	MD	10	3:00
Featherweight	Bruce Carrington	def.	Dana Coolwell	UD	8	3:00

^Note 1 14-ounce (400 g) gloves.
^Note 2 For WBA, WBC, IBF, WBO, and The Ring female light-welterweight titles.
^Note 3 For the WBC welterweight title.
^Note 4 For the vacant WBO female super-middleweight title.

== Fight details ==
=== Ruleset and sanctioning ===
The bout between Paul and Tyson was sanctioned as a professional bout by the Texas Department of Licensing and Regulations, with some regulations based on masters boxing for amateur participants over 35. The bout was eight rounds of two minutes each (two minute rounds are used in women's and amateur masters boxing) with 14-ounce gloves (slightly lighter than the masters boxing rule of 16 ounces). Knockouts and knockdowns were permitted, and no headgear was present (unlike masters boxing, which require headgear).

=== The fight ===
Paul walked out first to the song "In the Air Tonight" by Phil Collins alongside his brother Logan Paul in a custom Chevy Dually truck. Tyson then walked out to "Murdergram" by Murder Inc. After both men were in the ring, the national anthem was sung by Tori Kelly.

In the first round, both fighters entered in an orthodox stance, both throwing punches at each other. However, by the second round, Tyson seemed to have already been tired out and had lost momentum, which is a pattern that would continue throughout the fight. At the end of the last round, Paul bowed to Tyson, showing his respect and the two fighters embraced.

Paul won via unanimous decision. After the bout, Tyson indicated that he will not retire after this bout and proceeded to call out Paul's brother Logan, which Logan responded by saying "I'd kill you, Mike" to Tyson.

Laurence Cole		David Iacobucci		Jesse Reyes	
Paul	Tyson	Paul	Tyson	Paul	Tyson
79	73	80	72	79	73

=== Reported purses ===
It was reported that Paul's expected purse was $40 million, and Tyson's was $20 million. Taylor was projected to earn $6.1 million while Serrano claimed her purse was much larger.

== Controversies ==
=== Paul–Tyson age difference ===
Many criticized Paul for fighting Tyson due to the significant age difference. The 31-year age difference between Tyson and Paul is the largest age difference in professional boxing history. Current UFC Middleweight Champion Sean Strickland criticized Paul on X, stating, "this should be illegal" and called Paul a clown, with former Middleweight Champion Dricus du Plessis agreeing. Fellow YouTuber-turned-boxer KSI described the bout on Instagram as "elderly abuse". In response, Tyson had cited his years of training, calling himself a “different species of human being”. In a press conference with Kamaru Usman and Henry Cejudo, Tyson distinguished biological age from chronological age, stating “Our man's biggest downfall is to believe we have limitations and that's what we do, we believe we're a certain amount of age”. In a press conference, Paul stated “A lot of people are doubting me. I go onto the Instagram comments and I see them all saying, ‘If Jake wins this fight, it’s rigged’ because of how incredible he looks. Age doesn’t matter. Age is just a number. He’s a killer, he’s a warrior, he’s been doing this his whole, entire life, so it’s second nature to him. I’ve been doing this for four years, and I’ve been doing it at a super high level.”

In Nevada, where many contests are organised, special rules are in effect for boxers whose age will be 37 as of December 31 of that calendar year, have not participated in a combat contest in more than 36 months, or participated in 425 rounds of unarmed combat or exhibitions.

=== Altercation at weigh-in ===
During the weigh-in the day prior to the match, Paul stepped on Tyson's toes; Tyson has been on record stating he has foot problems due to health issues including sciatica, and has an aversion to people stepping on them. Tyson slapped Paul across the face, afterwards telling the New York Post "I was in my socks and he had on shoes. He stepped on my toe because he is a fucking asshole. I wanted to think it happened by accident. But now I think it may have happened on purpose," adding "I was in a lot of pain. I had to reciprocate." In social media posts, some speculated that Tyson's slap was in response to Paul making a racist gesture by climbing on stage and walking up to Tyson on all fours, imitating the knuckle-walking done by gorillas and chimpanzees. African Americans have historically been dehumanized with comparisons to non-human primates, including in sports.

=== Netflix technical issues ===
Netflix has been criticized for widespread technical difficulties that plagued the event's livestream. Many viewers tuning in were unable to watch the fight due to buffering. Many microphones and earpieces also experienced difficulties, with interviewee Evander Holyfield struggling to hear the host of the show because of issues with his earpiece. According to Downdetector, around 90,000 viewers reported outages in the hour leading up to the fight.

=== Allegations of fixing ===
Following the fight, a number of outlets expressed concerns that the fight was staged. Just before the fight started, a purported fight script was uploaded online, though the authenticity was doubted. Due to Paul claiming he "pulled his punches" after the fight, a video from the third round where Paul exposed his chin but Tyson did not hit him despite preparing to punch, claimed it was evidence of the fight being faked. In response, Most Valuable Promotions claimed that it could not have been scripted as that would have been illegal and a violation of the boxing license of both Texas Department of Licensing and Regulating Commission. Other media outlets also cited that any pulling of punches would have been done out of respect or sympathy and was not evidence of the fight being scripted.

Preceded by vs. Mike Perry	Jake Paul's bouts	Succeeded by TBD
Preceded by vs. Roy Jones Jr.	Mike Tyson's bouts	Succeeded by TBD
