= Melinda Watpool =

Canadian boxer (born 1989)

Personal information
- Nickname: The Whip
- Born: 30 April 1989 (age 37) Ontario, Canada
- Height: 5 ft 8 in (173 cm)
- Weight: Middleweight, Super-middleweight

Boxing career
- Stance: Orthodox

Boxing record
- Total fights: 10
- Wins: 9
- Win by KO: 4
- Losses: 1

Melinda Watpool (born 30 April 1989) is a Canadian professional boxer. She challenged for the WBO female super-middleweight title in 2024. As an amateur, Watpool represented her country at two World Championships.

== Career ==
After an amateur career featuring more than 60 bouts including representing Canada at two World Championships, Watpool turned professional in 2022.

With a perfect record of six wins from six pro-fights, she defeated Natasha Spence via unanimous decision at Pickering Casino Resort in Pickering, Ontario, to claim the vacant WBA female International middleweight title on 20 September 2024.

Moving up a weight division, she faced Shadasia Green for the vacant WBO female super-middleweight title on the undercard of the Jake Paul vs Mike Tyson contest at AT&T Stadium in Arlington, Texas, on 15 November 2024. Watpool lost by split decision with one ringside judge scoring the fight 96–94 in her favour, while the other two had it 97–94 and 96–94 respectively for her opponent.

Back at middleweight, Watpool returned to the competive boxing ring at CAA Centre in Brampton, Ontario, on 27 February 2026, stopping Szilvia Szabados in the first of their scheduled eight-round contest. At the same venue on 19 September 2026, she recorded a third round technical knockout win over Dolores Hernandez Garcia.

== Personal life ==
Away from boxing, Watpool co-owns a hardware store in the Pefferlaw community in Georgina, Ontario.

== Professional boxing record ==
10 fights	9 wins	1 loss
By knockout	4	0
By decision	5	1

No.	Result	Record	Opponent	Type	Round, time	Date	Location	Notes
10	Win	9–1	Maria Dolores Hernandez Garcia	TKO	3 (8), 0:23	19 Sep 2026	CAA Centre, Brampton, Ontario, Canada	
9	Win	8–1	Szilvia Szabados	TKO	1 (8), 1:40	27 Feb 2026	CAA Centre, Brampton, Ontario, Canada	
8	Loss	7–1	Shadasia Green	SD	10	15 Nov 2024	AT&T Stadium in Arlington, Texas, United States	For vacant WBO female super-middleweight title
7	Win	7–0	Natasha Spence	UD	10	20 Sep 2024	Pickering Casino Resort, Pickering Ontario, Canada	Won vacant WBA female International middleweight title
6	Win	6–0	Adriana Dos Santos Araujo	UD	8	13 Apr 2024	Pickering Casino Resort, Pickering, Ontario, Canada	
5	Win	5–0	Natasha Spence	UD	6	2 Dec 2023	Pickering Casino Resort, Pickering,,Ontario, Canada	
4	Win	4–0	Patricia Gonzalez	UD	8	9 Sep 2023	Pickering Casino Resort, Pickering, Ontario, Canada	
3	Win	3–0	Angelica Lopez Flores	RTD	4 (6), 3:00	27 May 2023	CAA Centre, Brampton, Ontario, Canada	
2	Win	2–0	Sofia Cervantes Leos	TKO	1 (4), 0:47	28 Jan 2023	Pickering Casino Resort, Pickering, Ontario, Canada	
1	Win	1–0	Silvia Silva Barraza	UD	4	9 Sep 2022	CAA Centre, Brampton, Ontario, Canada	
