= Shadasia Green =

American boxer (born 1989)

Personal information
- Nickname: The Sweet Terminator
- Born: Shadasia Amanda Green; August 7, 1989 (age 37) Paterson, New Jersey, U.S.
- Height: 5 ft 8 in (173 cm)
- Weight: Super middleweight

Boxing career
- Stance: Orthodox

Boxing record
- Total fights: 18
- Wins: 16
- Win by KO: 11
- Losses: 2
Medal record
Women's Amateur boxing
Representing United States
World Championships
Silver medal – second place	2016 Astana	Heavyweight

Shadasia Amanda Green (born August 7, 1989) is an American professional boxer. She held the WBO female super-middleweight title between November 2024 and April 2026 and the IBF female super-middleweight title from July 2025 until April 2026.

== Early life ==
Green was born in Paterson, New Jersey on August 7, 1989. She attended Old Dominion University where she played for the Ladies Monarchs basketball team.

== Amateur boxing career ==
At the 2016 AIBA Women's World Boxing Championships, Green competed in the heavyweight category, where she lost to Lazzat Kungeibayeva in the gold medal match.

== Professional boxing career ==
For the WBC female super-middleweight Silver title defense, Green fought Elin Cederroos on February 4, 2023. She dropped Cederroos to the canvas in round three, and the latter took heavy punishment in the sixth-round when referee Danny Schiavone stepped in to call a halt to the bout.

Green faced Olivia Curry on August 5, 2023, at the undercard of Jake Paul vs. Nate Diaz at the American Airlines Center in Dallas, Texas. She won the bout via unanimous decision.

After the WBC declared Savannah Marshall the champion-in-recess, as mandatory title challenger, Green faced Franchón Crews-Dezurn for the vacant WBC female super middleweight and interim WBA female super middleweight titles on December 15, 2023. She lost the bout by unanimous decision.

Green faced Natasha Spence on July 20, 2024, at the Jake Paul vs. Mike Perry card. She won the bout by unanimous decision.

=== World super-middleweight champion ===
==== Green vs. Watpool ====
Green faced Melinda Watpool for the vacant WBO female super middleweight title at the Jake Paul vs. Mike Tyson undercard on November 15, 2024. She won the bout by split decision to win the world title.

==== Green vs. Marshall ====
Holding the WBO super middleweight title, Green faced IBF champion Savannah Marshall at Madison Square Garden, New York City, New York, on July 11, 2025, in a unification fight. She won by split decision.

==== Green vs. Daniels ====
Green lost her titles via ninth round stoppage to Lani Daniels at The Theater at Madison Square Garden in New York City on April 17, 2026. Following the bout she was taken from the ring on a stretcher and transported to hospital although in a post-fight press conference her promotor, Nakisa Bidarian, said she was "awake and talkative". Green later revealed in a post on social media that she had suffered a brain bleed and was treated in an intensive care unit.

== Professional boxing record ==
18 fights	16 wins	2 losses
By knockout	11	1
By decision	5	1

No.	Result	Record	Opponent	Type	Round, time	Date	Location	Notes
18	Loss	16–2	Lani Daniels	TKO	9 (10), 0:32	April 17, 2026	Madison Square Garden Theater, New York City, New York, U.S.	Lost IBF, WBO, and The Ring super-middleweight titles
17	Win	16–1	Savannah Marshall	SD	10	Jul 11, 2025	Madison Square Garden, New York City, New York, U.S.	Retained WBO super-middleweight title; Won IBF and The Ring super-middleweight titles
16	Win	15–1	Melinda Watpool	SD	10	Nov 15, 2024	AT&T Stadium, Arlington, Texas, U.S.	Won the vacant WBO super-middleweight title
15	Win	14–1	Natasha Spence	UD	8	Jul 20, 2024	Amalie Arena, Tampa, Florida, U.S.	
14	Loss	13–1	Franchón Crews-Dezurn	UD	10	Dec 15, 2023	Caribe Royale Orlando, Orlando, Florida, U.S.	For the WBA interim and vacant WBC super-middleweight titles
13	Win	13–0	Olivia Curry	UD	10	Aug 5, 2023	American Airlines Center, Dallas, Texas, U.S.	
12	Win	12–0	Elin Cederroos	TKO	6 (10), 1:08	Feb 4, 2023	Hulu Theater, New York City, New York, US	Retained WBC Silver super-middleweight title
11	Win	11–0	Ogleidis Suárez	RTD	5 (8), 2:00	Oct 29, 2022	Desert Diamond Arena, Glendale, Arizona, U.S.	
10	Win	10–0	Celia Rosa Sierra	TKO	3 (10), 0:49	Jun 29, 2022	Coliseo Municipal, Cienaga, Colombia	Won vacant ABF Intercontinental super-middleweight title
9	Win	9–0	Angelica López Flores	TKO	1 (10), 1:35	Jan 15, 2022	Gym Municipal, Jamay, Mexico	Won vacant WBC Silver super-middleweight title
8	Win	8–0	Angie Barcas	TKO	1 (8), 1:29	May 1, 2021	Palmito, Colombia	
7	Win	7–0	Silvia Zúñiga	KO	1 (8), 1:11	Dec 18, 2020	Campestre Ojo de Agua, Ocotlán, Mexico	
6	Win	6–0	Martha Patricia Lara Gaytan	TKO	1 (8), 1:17	Oct 3, 2020	Campestre Ojo de Agua, Ocotlán, Mexico	Won vacant WBC International super-middleweight title
5	Win	5–0	Maricela García Mendoza	TKO	6 (8), 1:46	Jul 25, 2020	Campestre Ojo de Agua, Ocotlán, Mexico	
4	Win	4–0	Silvia Jiménez	TKO	3 (6), 1:36	Mar 14, 2020	Arena San Martin de las Flores, Tlaquepaque, Mexico	
3	Win	3–0	Irais Hernandez	UD	6	Sep 21, 2019	Genetti Manor, Wilkes-Barre, Pennsylvania, U.S.	
2	Win	2–0	Jessica Roberson	TKO	1 (4), 0:56	Jun 15, 2019	Jamil Shrine Temple, Columbia, South Carolina, U.S.	
1	Win	1–0	Briana Kirkwood	TKO	2 (4), 1:04	Jan 26, 2019	Extravaganza, Charlotte, North Carolina, U.S.	

== See also ==
- List of female boxers

Sporting positions
Regional boxing titles
Vacant Title last held by Maricela Cornejo	WBC International super-middleweight champion October 3, 2020 – November 15, 2024; Won world title	Vacant
Vacant Title last held by Claressa Shields	WBC Silver super-middleweight champion January 15, 2022 – November 15, 2024; Won world title	Vacant
New title	ABFInter-Continental super-middleweight champion June 29, 2022 – November 15, 2024; Won world title	Vacant
World boxing titles
Vacant Title last held by Savannah Marshall	WBO super-middleweight champion November 15, 2024 – present	Incumbent
Preceded by Savannah Marshall	IBF super-middleweight champion July 11, 2025 – present	Incumbent
Preceded by Savannah Marshall	The Ring super-middleweight champion July 11, 2025 – present	Incumbent
