= Arundhati Choudhary =

Indian boxer

Personal information
- Born: 5 September 2002 (age 24) Kota, Rajasthan, India

Sport
- Sport: Boxing
- Weight class: 70 kg
Medal record
Women's boxing
Representing India
World Boxing Cup
Gold medal – first place	2025 New Delhi	70 kg
Commonwealth Games
Gold medal – first place	2026 Glasgow	70 kg
Asian Elite Championships
Gold medal – first place	2026 Ulaanbaatar	70 kg
Youth World Championships
Gold medal – first place	2021 Kielce	Welterweight

Arundhati Choudhary (born 5 September 2002) is an Indian boxer who competes in the welterweight category. She won the gold medal in the 70 kg category at the 2025 World Boxing Cup Finals in New Delhi, and the gold medal in the 70 kg category at the 2026 Commonwealth Games in Glasgow.

== Early life ==
Arundathi Choudhary was born on 5 September 2002 in Kota, Rajasthan. She started playing basketball during her early days and took up boxing at the age of 15. She was initially coached by Ashok Gautam. She is supported by the Olympic Gold Quest.

== Career ==
Choudhary won the Rajasthan State Sub-Junior Championship in 2016. She won the gold medal in the 60 kg category in the 1st Junior National Boxing Championship at Haryana. She took part in the Valeria Demyanova Memorial Tournament in Ukraine in 2017, the 7th Nations Cup in Serbia in 2018, the Esker All Female Boxing Cup in Ireland in 2019, and the Adriatic Pearl tournament in Montenegro. In 2018, she moved up to the 70 kg category and won the silver medal at the 2nd Junior National Men & Women Boxing Championship at Mohali. She won gold medals in the 60 kg category in the Khelo India School Games in 2018, 2019, and 2020.

In the 2021 AIBA Youth World Boxing Championships held in Kielce, she won the gold medal in the welterweight category. In October 2025, she won the gold medal in the Boxing Federation of India Cup at Chennai following recovery from a wrist surgery she underwent in 2024. She won the gold medal in the 70 kg category in the finals of the 2025 World Boxing Cup in New Delhi. She was part of the Indian team at the 2026 Commonwealth Games at Glasgow. In the quarter-finals of the women's 70 kg event at the Commonwealth Games, she defeated New Zealand's Morgan Henderson advance to the semi-finals. In the semi-finals, she defeated Rosie Eccles of Wales to progress to the finals. In the finals, she defeated Chantelle Reid of England by a unanimous decision to win the gold medal.
