= 2026 European Boxing Championships – Women's 80 kg =

Women's 80 kg at the 2026 European Boxing Championships
- Venue: Asics Arena
- Location: Sofia, Bulgaria
- Dates: 19–24 September
- Competitors: 11 from 11 nations

Medalists
gold medal	Lisa O'Rourke	Ireland
silver medal	Anastasiia Demurchian	Russia
bronze medal	Iryna Lutsak	Ukraine
bronze medal	Stella Blažková	Czech Republic

The women's 80 kg competition at the 2026 European Boxing Championships was held from 19 to 24 September 2026.

== Results ==
Round of 16; 19 September
(Republic of Ireland) Lisa O'Rourke	5
(Greece) Vasiliki Stavridou	0
(Georgia (country)) Tatia Bukia
(Russia) Anastasiia Demurchian	RSC
(Turkey) Yaren Düztaş	1
(Czech Republic) Stella Blažková	4

Quarterfinals; 22 September
(England) Emily Asquith	0
(Republic of Ireland) Lisa O'Rourke	5
(Ukraine) Iryna Lutsak	5
(Bulgaria) Aleyna Mehmed	0
(Norway) Sofia Sørensen	0
(Russia) Anastasiia Demurchian	5
(Czech Republic) Stella Blažková	3
(Poland) Emilia Koterska	2

Semifinals; 23 September
(Republic of Ireland) Lisa O'Rourke	5
(Ukraine) Iryna Lutsak	0
(Russia) Anastasiia Demurchian	5
(Czech Republic) Stella Blažková	0

Final; 24 September
(Republic of Ireland) Lisa O'Rourke	4
(Russia) Anastasiia Demurchian	1
