= Rosie Eccles =

Welsh boxer (born 1996)

Personal information
- Full name: Rosie Joy Eccles
- Nationality: Welsh
- Born: 23 July 1996 (age 30) Newport, Wales
- Height: 173 cm (5 ft 8 in)

Boxing career
- Weight class: Light-welterweight, welterweight, light-middleweight
- Stance: Orthodox
Medal record
Women's amateur boxing
Representing Great Britain
European Games
Bronze medal – third place	2023 Kraków-Małopolska	Welterweight
Representing Wales
European Championships
Silver medal – second place	2016 Sofia	Light welterweight
Bronze medal – third place	2019 Alcobendas	Welterweight
Commonwealth Games
Gold medal – first place	2022 Birmingham	Light middleweight
Silver medal – second place	2018 Gold Coast	Welterweight
Bronze medal – third place	2026 Glasgow	70 kg

Rosie Joy Eccles (born 23 July 1996) is a Welsh former boxer. She won a gold medal at the 2022 Commonwealth Games as well as a host of other medals at international competitions representing both Wales and Great Britain.

== Career ==
Eccles won a silver medal at the 2016 Women's European Amateur Boxing Championships losing in the light-welterweight final to Aleksandra Ordina from Russia. At the 2018 Commonwealth Games she also took silver when she lost in the welterweight final to England's Sandy Ryan by split decision (3:2).

Eccles won bronze at the 2019 Women's European Amateur Boxing Championships after going out in the welterweight semi-finals via split decision to Italian Angela Carini.

She also competed at the 2019 World Championships in Ulan-Ude, Russia, where she lost by unanimous decision to Yang Liu in the round of 16.

Eccles won a gold medal in the light-middleweight division at the 2022 Commonwealth Games stopping Australia's Kaye Scott in round two of the final.

She secured a quota place for the 2024 Summer Olympics by taking a bronze medal at the 2023 European Games in Poland. On 7 June 2024, Eccles was officially announced in the Great Britain squad for the Olympics. She was drawn to fight Poland’s Aneta Rygielska in the first round of the 66 kg division, losing by a controversial split decision. BBC Sport commentators could not hide their shock at the result because Eccles had been ahead throughout her bout with Rygielska. The Polish boxer even had a point deducted and a warning for failing to keep her head up. The two ringside judges who deemed it equal then signalled that Rygielska was the winner, despite her infringement. BBC's Steve Bunce was left stunned saying "I'm really annoyed. It's a bad decision."

In March 2026, Eccles left the GB Boxing World Class Programme and announced she intended to retire from boxing after the Commonwealth Games later that year. Having been selected to compete in the 70 kg division at the Games in Glasgow, she was chosen as Wales' opening ceremony flagbearer. Eccles won a bronze medal after losing 4:0 to Arundhati Choudhary of India in the semifinals. In media interviews following the bout she confirmed her retirement from the sport.
