= Kaye Scott =

Australian boxer (born 1984)

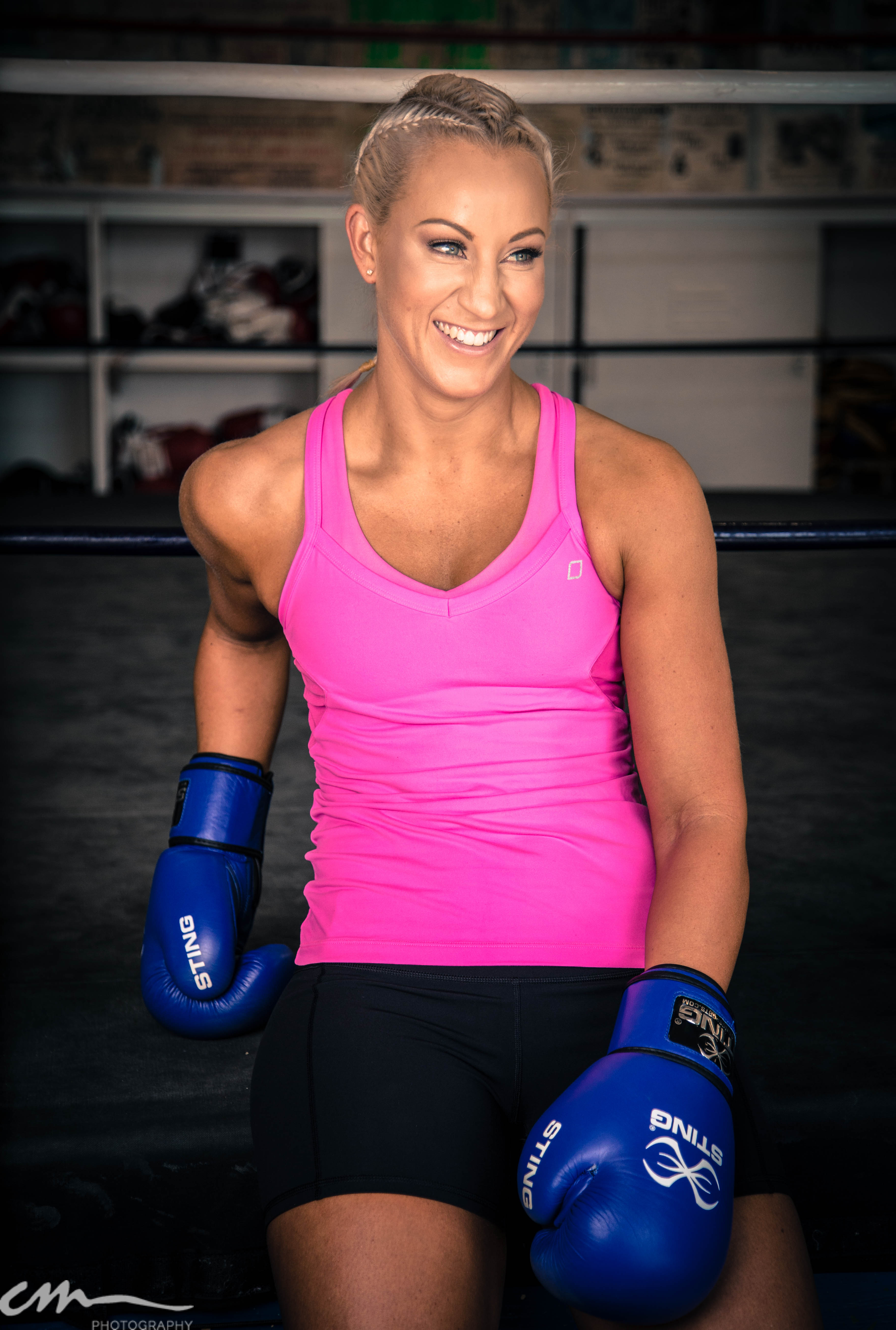

Personal information
- Nickname: Glamour
- Born: Kaye Francis Scott; 2 June 1984 (age 42) Sydney, Australia
- Height: 5 ft 10 in (178 cm)
- Weight: Middleweight

Boxing career
- Reach: 70 in (178 cm)
- Stance: Orthodox

Boxing record
- Total fights: 8
- Wins: 5
- Win by KO: 0
- Losses: 2
- Draws: 1
Medal record
Women's Amateur boxing
Representing Australia
World Championships
Silver medal – second place	2016 Astana	Light heavyweight
Silver medal – second place	2023 New Delhi	Light middleweight
Commonwealth Games
Bronze medal – third place	2018 Gold Coast	Welterweight
Silver medal – second place	2022 Birmingham	light middleweight

Kaye Scott (born 2 June 1984) is an Australian professional boxer. She held the unified World Boxing Council (WBC) and World Boxing Association (WBA) female middleweight titles from December 2025 to August 2026. As an amateur, Scott won multiple World Championship and Commonwealth Games medals across three weight divisions.

== Amateur boxing career ==
After the ban was lifted on women's boxing in New South Wales, Scott took part in the first female bout in the state, an exhibition fight with Ramona Stephenson in October 2009. She competed in the middleweight division at the 2014 Commonwealth Games losing to Lauren Price of Wales in the quarter-finals. However, she fared better at the Women's World Championships in 2016 when she competed as a light-heavyweight and won a silver medal, losing to China's Yang Xiaoli in the final. At the 2018 Commonwealth Games on the Gold Coast in Australia, Scott won a bronze medal at welterweight. She went one step further at the 2022 Commonwealth Games in England by taking a silver medal after being stopped in round two of the light-middleweight final by Wales' Rosie Eccles. Scott claimed her second world championship silver medal at the 2023 edition in India where she lost the light-middleweight final to Russia's Anastasia Demurchian by unanimous decision.

== Professional boxing career ==
Scott made her professional boxing debut on 25 November 2023 with a unanimous decision win over Connie Chan to claim the vacant Australasian female middleweight title.

In her next bout on 23 March 2024 she won a second title, this time grabbing the vacant Australian female middleweight crown thanks to a majority decision victory against Desley Robinson.

Scott and Robinson met again on 13 December 2024, with the vacant IBF female middleweight title on the line. Robinson won by unanimous decision.

=== Unified WBA and WBC middleweight champion ===
==== Scott vs. Curry ====
Scott faced Olivia Curry for the vacant WBC and WBA female middleweight titles at Fox Theater in Detroit, Michigan, on 19 September 2025. The fight ended in a majority draw with one judge scoring it 98–92 for Scott and the other two a 95–95 draw.

==== Scott vs. Curry II ====
A rematch between Scott and Curry for the vacant WBA and WBC female middleweight titles was scheduled to take place on 20 December 2025, once again at the Fox Theater in Detroit on 20 December 2025. Scott won by majority decision with two of the judges favouring her 98–92 and 97–93 respectively while the third scored the bout a 95–95 draw.

==== Scott vs. Shields ====
Scott was scheduled to defend her unified WBA and WBC middleweight titles against Claressa Shields at State Farm Arena, Atlanta, Georgia, on 15 August 2026. She lost via technical knockout in the sixth round.

== Professional boxing record ==
8 fights	5 wins	2 losses
By knockout	0	1
By decision	5	1
Draws	1	

No.	Result	Record	Opponent	Type	Round, time	Date	Location	Notes
8	Loss	5–2–1	Claressa Shields	TKO	6 (10), 1:38	15 Aug 2026	State Farm Arena, Atlanta, Georgia, U.S.	Lost WBA and WBC female middleweight titles
7	Win	5–1–1	Olivia Curry	MD	10	20 Dec 2025	Fox Theater, Detroit, Michigan, U.S.	Won vacant WBA and WBC female middleweight titles
6	Draw	4–1–1	Olivia Curry	MD	10	19 Sep 2025	Fox Theater, Detroit, Michigan, U.S.	For vacant WBA and WBC female middleweight titles
5	Loss	4–1	Desley Robinson	UD	10	13 Dec 2024	The Star Event Centre, Sydney, Australia	For vacant IBF female middleweight title
4	Win	4–0	Thanthip Wannaphrom	UD	4	7 Sep 2024	Spaceplus Bangkok RCA, Bangkok, Thailand	
3	Win	3–0	Macca Jean	UD	6	1 Aug 2024	Bella Vista Hotel, Bella Vista, Australia	
2	Win	2–0	Desley Robinson	MD	8	23 Mar 2024	JBS Basketball Arena, Ipswich, Australia	Won vacant Australian female middleweight title
1	Win	1–0	Connie Chan	UD	8	25 Nov 2023	Hornsby RSL Club, Hornsby, Sydney, Australia	Won vacant ANBF Australasian female middleweight title

== See also ==
- Boxing in Australia
- List of female boxers

Sporting positions
Regional boxing titles
Vacant Title last held by Hayley Adrian	ANBF Australasian middleweight champion 25 November 2023 – 2024; Vacated	Vacant
Preceded by Desley Robinson	Australian middleweight champion 23 March 2024 – 2024; Vacated	Vacant
World boxing titles
Vacant Title last held by Claressa Shields	WBA middleweight champion 20 December 2025 – 15 August 2026	Succeeded by Claressa Shields
Vacant Title last held by Claressa Shields	WBC middleweight champion 20 December 2025 – 15 August 2026	Succeeded by Claressa Shields
