= Aziza Zokirova =

Uzbekistani boxer (born 2004)

Personal information
- Nationality: Uzbekistani
- Born: 1 December 2004 (age 21) Jizzakh, Uzbekistan

Boxing career
Medal record
Women's amateur boxing
Representing Uzbekistan
World Championships
Bronze medal – third place	2025 Liverpool	70 kg
Asian Championships
Silver medal – second place	2024 Chiang Mai	Middleweight
Junior World Championships
Silver medal – second place	2022 La Nucia	Light middleweight
Asian Youth Championships
Gold medal – first place	2022 Amman	Welterweight

Aziza Zokirova (born 1 December 2004) is an Uzbekistani boxer. She won a bronze medal at the 2025 World Boxing Championships in the 70 kg category.

== Amateur career ==
In March 2022, Zokirova competed in the Asian Youth & Junior Championships, where she won the gold medal in the welterweight category. Later that year, she competed in the Youth World Championships, winning the silver medal in the light middleweight category.

In March 2024, Zokirova competed at the World Qualification Tournament 1 in Busto Arsizio, Italy, where she lost to Chantelle Reid by unanimous decision in the quarter-finals. In December 2024, she won the silver in the Asian Championships in the middleweight category, in which she lost to Wang Lina in the gold medal match.

In March 2025, Zokirova competed in the middleweight division at the 2025 IBA Women's World Championships where she lost to Aoife O'Rourke in the quarterfinals. In September, she competed in the 70 kg category of the 2025 World Boxing Championships held in Liverpool, England. She defeated Regina Lakos in the round of 16 and Leonie Müller in the quarterfinals. Heading to the semifinals, she lost to Lekeisha Pergoliti.

== Personal life ==
Zokirova is the daughter of Lazizbek Zokirov and sister of Jakhongir Zokirov, both boxers.
