= Lisa O'Rourke =

Irish boxer (born 2002)

Personal information
- Full name: Lisa Edel O'Rourke
- Nationality: Irish
- Born: 13 May 2002 (age 24)

Sport
- Sport: Boxing
- Weight class: Light middleweight
Medal record
Women's amateur boxing
Representing Ireland
IBA World Championships
Gold medal – first place	2022 Istanbul	Light middleweight
Silver medal – second place	2025 Nis	Light middleweight
European Boxing Championships
Gold medal – first place	2026 Sofia	80 kg
European U22 Championships
Gold medal – first place	2022 Porec	Light middleweight
Gold medal – first place	2024 Sofia	Light middleweight

Lisa Edel O'Rourke (born 13 May 2002) is an Irish amateur boxer. O'Rourke won a gold medal at the 2022 World Championships in the light middleweight division, and in the 80 kg class at the 2026 European Boxing Championships.

== Career ==
O'Rourke won the gold medal at the 2022 World Championships in the light middleweight division, defeating Alcinda Panguana in the final. She also won a silver medal at the 2025 World Championships.

She won the gold medal in the 80 kg division at the 2026 European Championships and is also a double European Under 22 champion, after winning the light middleweight title in 2022 and 2024.

== Personal life ==
O'Rourke's sister Aoife is also an international amateur boxer for Ireland. In 2025, the sisters made boxing history, by becoming the first sisters to win through to contest a World Championship final in the same tournament. Also in 2025, the sisters won gold at the World Hyrox Championships in Chicago.
